= Miss Diva 2022 =

10th edition of Miss Diva

- Date: October 30, 2022
- Entertainment: Mouni Roy; Nehal Chudasama; Ritika Khatnani
- Venue: Famous Studios, Mumbai
- Broadcaster: Voot
- Entrants: 22
- Placements: 6
- Winner: Divita Rai; Pragnya Ayyagari; Ojasvi Sharma

Miss Diva 2022 was the 10th edition of the Miss Diva pageant, held at the Famous Studios in Mumbai, India, on 30 October 2022.

At the end of the event, Harnaaz Sandhu crowned Divita Rai as her successor. She represented India in the Miss Universe 2022 pageant and placed in the top 16.

Ritika Khatnani crowned Pragnya Ayyagari as her successor. She competed in the Miss Supranational 2023 pageant representing India. She placed in the top 12 and was crowned as Miss Supranational Asia 2023.

Sonal Kukreja crowned Ojasvi Sharma as the successor to Liva Miss Popular Choice 2022.

== Results ==
=== Placements ===
Color keys

- The contestant was a Semifinalist in an International pageant.

Placement	Contestant	International placement
Miss Universe India 2022	Divita Rai	Top 16 – Miss Universe 2022
Miss Supranational India 2023	Pragnya Ayyagari	Top 12 – Miss Supranational 2023
Miss Popular Choice 2022	Ojasvi Sharma	

== Background ==
In July 2022, it was announced that the 10th anniversary edition will be celebrated. The competition will be held on 28 August 2022. Winners will be selected from existing pool of candidates that have previously competed at international pageants or at Miss Diva and have done exceptionally well after rigorous rounds of interviews and judging as per Miss Universe and Miss Supranational standards by the organization. 7 days prior to the competition and audience vote will be conducted and the winner will represent Liva as Miss Popular Choice 2022. The event will be glamorous and will be attended by celebs, media teams, reigning Miss Universe and her team.

== Red Carpet Attendees ==
The following is a list of national and international beauty pageant winners from India, as well as other Bollywood celebrities, who attended the Miss Diva 10th anniversary red carpet.

=== Pageant Titleholders ===
==== International ====
- Harnaaz Sandhu – Miss Universe 2021
- Lara Dutta – Miss Universe 2000
- Rohit Khandelwal – Mister World 2016
- Srishti Rana – Miss Asia Pacific 2013

==== Miss Diva ====
- Aditi Hundia – Miss Diva Supranational 2018
- Aishwarya Dhavale – Miss Diva 2015 Finalist
- Alankrita Sahai – Miss Diva Earth 2014
- Hemali Sonii – Miss Diva 2015 Finalist
- Naveli Deshmukh – Miss Diva 2015 2nd runner-up
- Neha Jaiswal – Miss Diva 2020 runner-up
- Nehal Chudasama – Miss Diva Universe 2018
- Noyonita Lodh – Miss Diva Universe 2014
- Peden Ongmu Namgyal – Miss Diva Supranational 2017
- Shefali Sood – Miss Diva Supranational 2019
- Sonal Kukreja – Miss Diva 2021 1st runner-up
- Ritika Khatnani – Miss Diva Supranational 2021
- Vartika Singh – Miss Diva Universe 2019

==== Femina Miss India ====
- Aruna Beniwal – Femina Miss India Rajasthan 2020
- Manika Sheokand – Femina Miss Grand India 2020
- Manya Singh – Femina Miss India 2020 1st runner-up
- Meher Castelino – Femina Miss India Universe 1964
- Rubal Shekhawat – Femina Miss India 2022 1st runner-up
- Ruhi Singh – Femina Miss India United Nations 2012
- Sangeeta Motilal Bijlani – Femina Miss India Universe 1980
- Shivani Jadhav – Femina Miss Grand India 2019
- Sini Sadanand Shetty – Femina Miss India World 2022
- Suman Rao – Femina Miss India World 2019
- Tanushree Dutta – Femina Miss India Universe 2004

==== Mister India ====
- Rahul Rajasekharan – Mister India Supranational 2020

=== Other Celebrities ===
- Alesia Raut – Rampwalk Expert
- Anjali Raut – Rampwalk Expert
- Mouni Roy – Bollywood Actress
- Natasha Bharadwaj – Bollywood Actress

== Nominees ==
The following are the nominees for Miss Diva Supranational and Liva Miss Popular Choice 2022:

Color key

- The contestant Won Miss Diva Supranational Title.
- The contestant Won Miss Popular Choice Title.

Nu.	Contestant	Age (Note: Ages at the time of the pageant.)	Previous Title(s)
Miss Diva Supranational 2023 & Miss Popular Choice 2022
1.	Amisha Thakur	23	Femina Miss India Himachal Pradesh 2022
2.	Gargee Nandy	25	Femina Miss India Meghalaya 2022
3.	Ojasvi Sharma	25	Miss Diva 2021 Finalist
4.	Pragnya Ayyagari	20	Femina Miss India Telangana 2022
5.	Sifat Sehgal	22	Femina Miss India Chhattisgarh 2022

== Crossovers ==
Contestants who previously competed in previous editions of Liva Miss Diva and other local and international beauty pageants with their respective placements.

=== National pageants ===
Miss Diva

- 2021: Divita Rai (2nd Runner Up)
- 2021: Ojaswi Sharma

Femina Miss India 2022

- Chhattisgarh: Sifat Sehgal (Top 10)
- Himachal Pradesh: Amisha Thakur (Top 10)
- Meghalaya: Gargee Nandy (Top 5)
- Telangana: Pragnya Ayyagari (Top 5)

Miss Universe India 2024

- Ojasvi Sharma (Top 10)
