= Miss Diva 2023 =

11th edition of Miss Diva

- Date: 27 August 2023
- Presenters: Sachin Kumbhar; Supreet Bedi
- Entertainment: Pulkit Samrat; Hari & Sukhmani; Kumar Kathak Rockers
- Venue: The LaLiT, Mumbai, India
- Broadcaster: JioCinema
- Entrants: 16
- Placements: 7
- Winner: Shweta Sharda Sonal Kukreja
- Photogenic: Nickita Arora; Faridabad

Miss Diva 2023 was the 11th edition of the Miss Diva pageant, held at The LaLit in Mumbai, India, on 27 August 2023.

At the end of the event, Divita Rai crowned her successor Shweta Sharda, while Pragnya Ayyagari crowned her successor Sonal Kukreja. Sharda represented India at Miss Universe 2023 in El Salvador on 18 November 2023, where she finished in the top 20, and Kukreja represented India at Miss Supranational 2024 in Poland on 17 July 2024, where she finished in the top 12.

== Results ==
=== Placements ===
Color keys

- The contestant secured victory in an international pageant.
- The contestant finished as a runner-up in an international pageant.
- The contestant reached the semi-finals in an international pageant.

| Placement | Contestant | International Placement |
|---|---|---|
| Miss Diva Universe 2023 | Shweta Sharda | Top 20 – Miss Universe 2023 |
| Miss Diva Supranational 2024 | Sonal Kukreja | Top 12 – Miss Supranational 2024 |
| 1st Runner Up | • Trisha Shetty | |
| 2nd runner up | • Daisy Khound | |
| 3rd runner up | • Nickita Arora | |
| 4th runner up | • Zuchobeni Tungoe | |
| Top 7 | • Aruna Beniwal | |

== Sub-Contests ==
| Sub-Contest | Winner |
|---|---|
| Miss Popular Choice | Zuchobeni Tungoe |
| Miss Glamorous | Arushi Singh |
| Miss Photogenic | Nickita Arora |
| Miss Talented | Zuchobeni Tungoe; Shweta Sharda |
| Miss Body Beautiful | Shweta Sharda |
| Miss Rampwalk | Daisy Khound |
| Miss Sudoku | Arushi Singh |

== Format ==
In contrast to the competition's previous year's model, where the representatives were appointed, this year will see a return to the competition's standard format, with the initial process beginning with registration and auditions and ending with the shortlisting of candidates to the grand finale.

For the first time in its history, the pageant accepts applications from participants of all relationship statuses - married, divorced, pregnant, engaged, widowed and trans women. Additionally, the height standard has been changed to a reduced format.

== Selection Committee ==
- Harnaaz Sandhu - Miss Universe 2021
- Srinidhi Shetty - Miss Supranational 2016
- Sangeeta Bijlani - Femina Miss India Universe 1980
- Pratik Gandhi - Actor
- Jatin Kampani - Celebrity Photographer
- Nikita Mhaisalkar - Celebrity & Grand Finale Gown Designer
- Abhishek Sharma - Celebrity Designer

== Contestants ==
The following are the official contestants:

| Nu. | Contestant | Age (Note: Ages at the time of the pageant) | Height | Hometown | Placement |
|---|---|---|---|---|---|
| 1 | Aishwarya Dikshit | 27 | 5 ft 5 in (1.65 m) | Mumbai | |
| 2 | Aayushi Tiwari | 25 | 5 ft 9 in (1.75 m) | Balaghat | |
| 3 | Apurva Chavan | 26 | 5 ft 5 in (1.65 m) | Pune | |
| 4 | Archana Bhavsar | 22 | 5 ft 8 in (1.73 m) | Mumbai | |
| 5 | Arushi Singh | 22 | 5 ft 7 in (1.70 m) | Jaipur | |
| 6 | Aruna Beniwal | 21 | 5 ft 7 in (1.70 m) | Jaipur | Top 7 |
| 7 | Daisy Khound (Note: Winner of Miss North East Diva, a regional Miss Diva sister pageant, get direct spot as a finalist at Miss Diva national competition.) | 22 | 5 ft 9 in (1.75 m) | Jorhat | Top 7 |
| 8 | Devyani Jagtap | 23 | 5 ft 6 in (1.68 m) | Pune | |
| 9 | Gopika Suresh | 24 | 5 ft 5 in (1.65 m) | Kannur | |
| 10 | Nickita Arora | 24 | 5 ft 7 in (1.70 m) | Faridabad | Top 7 |
| 11 | Sarannya Sharma | 19 | 5 ft 6 in (1.68 m) | Delhi | |
| 12 | Sonal Kukreja | 25 | 5 ft 9 in (1.75 m) | Jaipur | Miss Diva Supranational 2024 |
| 13 | Shweta Sharda | 22 | 5 ft 11 in (1.80 m) | Chandigarh | Miss Diva Universe 2023 |
| 14 | Trisha Shetty | 22 | 5 ft 9 in (1.75 m) | Mumbai | Runner-up |
| 15 | Vidhi Giri | 22 | 5 ft 7 in (1.70 m) | Chandigarh | |
| 16 | Zuchobeni Tungoe | 25 | 5 ft 7 in (1.70 m) | Kohima | Top 7 |

== Crossovers ==
The following are contestants who have competed in other national beauty pageants:

| Pageant | Year | Delegate | Placement |
|---|---|---|---|
| Femina Miss India | 2019 | Vidhi Giri | Regional Finalist (Top 3 from Punjab) |
| Femina Miss India | 2020 | Aruna Beniwal | Top 15 |
| Femina Miss India | 2020 | Trisha Shetty | |
| Femina Miss India | 2020 | Zuchobeni Tüngoe | Top 15 |
| Femina Miss India | 2022 | Aishwarya Dikshit | Regional Finalist (Top 19 from Maharashtra) |
| Femina Miss India | 2022 | Daisy Khound | Regional Finalist (Top 10 from Assam) |
| Femina Miss India | 2023 | | |
| Femina Miss India | 2023 | Apurva Chavan | Top 7 |
| Femina Miss India | 2023 | Devyani Jagtap | Regional Finalist (Top 25 from Maharashtra) |
| Femina Miss India | 2023 | Gopika Suresh | Regional Finalist (Top 10 from Kerala) |
| Miss Diva | 2018 | Apurva Chavan | Top 10 |
| Miss Diva | 2021 | Sonal Kukreja | 1st Runner-up |
| Glamanand Supermodel India | 2019 | Trisha Shetty | 1st Runner-up |
| Glamanand Supermodel India | 2021 | Aishwarya Dikshit | Top 15 |
| Glamanand Supermodel India | 2021 | Arushi Singh | Top 8 |
