= Miss Diva 2019 =

7th edition of Miss Diva

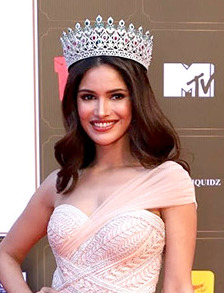
- Vartika Singh
- Date: 26 September 2019
- Presenters: Shamita Singha
- Entertainment: Kangana Ranaut
- Venue: Rocky Star Cocktail Bar, Mumbai
- Broadcaster: Miss Diva
- Winner: • Vartika Singh

Miss Diva 2019 was the 7th edition of the Miss Diva beauty pageant held on 26 September 2019. Miss Universe India 2018, Nehal Chudasama crowned Vartika Singh as her successor. She represented India at Miss Universe 2019 which was held in Atlanta, Georgia. Shefali Sood was crowned as Miss Supranational India 2019 by her predecessor, Aditi Hundia and she represented India at Miss Supranational 2019 held in Poland. Also, Varun Verma was selected as India's representative at the Mister Supranational 2019 contest.

== Background ==
In 2019, Liva Fluid Fashion obtained the sponsorship rights for the Miss Diva pageant from the previous sponsor, Yamaha Fascino. The first edition under their support was scheduled be held in 2020. Since there was no official pageant in 2019, Indian representatives for international pageants were appointed by the Miss India Organization. Preceding Miss Diva delegates were selected to compete in Miss Universe 2019 and Miss Supranational 2019 contests. The new titleholders - Vartika Singh, Shefali Sood and Varun Verma were sashed by Kangana Ranaut in a ceremony.

== Final results ==
Color keys

- The contestant Won in an International pageant.
- The contestant was a Runner-up in an International pageant.
- The contestant was a Semi-Finalist in an International pageant.
- Unplaced

Final Results	Candidate	International Placement
Miss Universe India 2019	Vartika Singh	Top 20
Miss Supranational India 2019	Shefali Sood	Top 16
Mister Supranational India 2019	Varun Verma	Top 8

Notes

- Vartika Singh was among the Top 7 finalists at Miss Diva 2014.
- Shefali Sood was among the Top 10 finalists at Miss Diva 2018.
- Varun Verma was the 1st runner-up at Mister India 2016.
