= Sir J. J. College of Architecture =

Architecture school in Mumbai, India

Coordinates: 18.944730°N 72.833967°E

Sir J. J. College Of Architecture
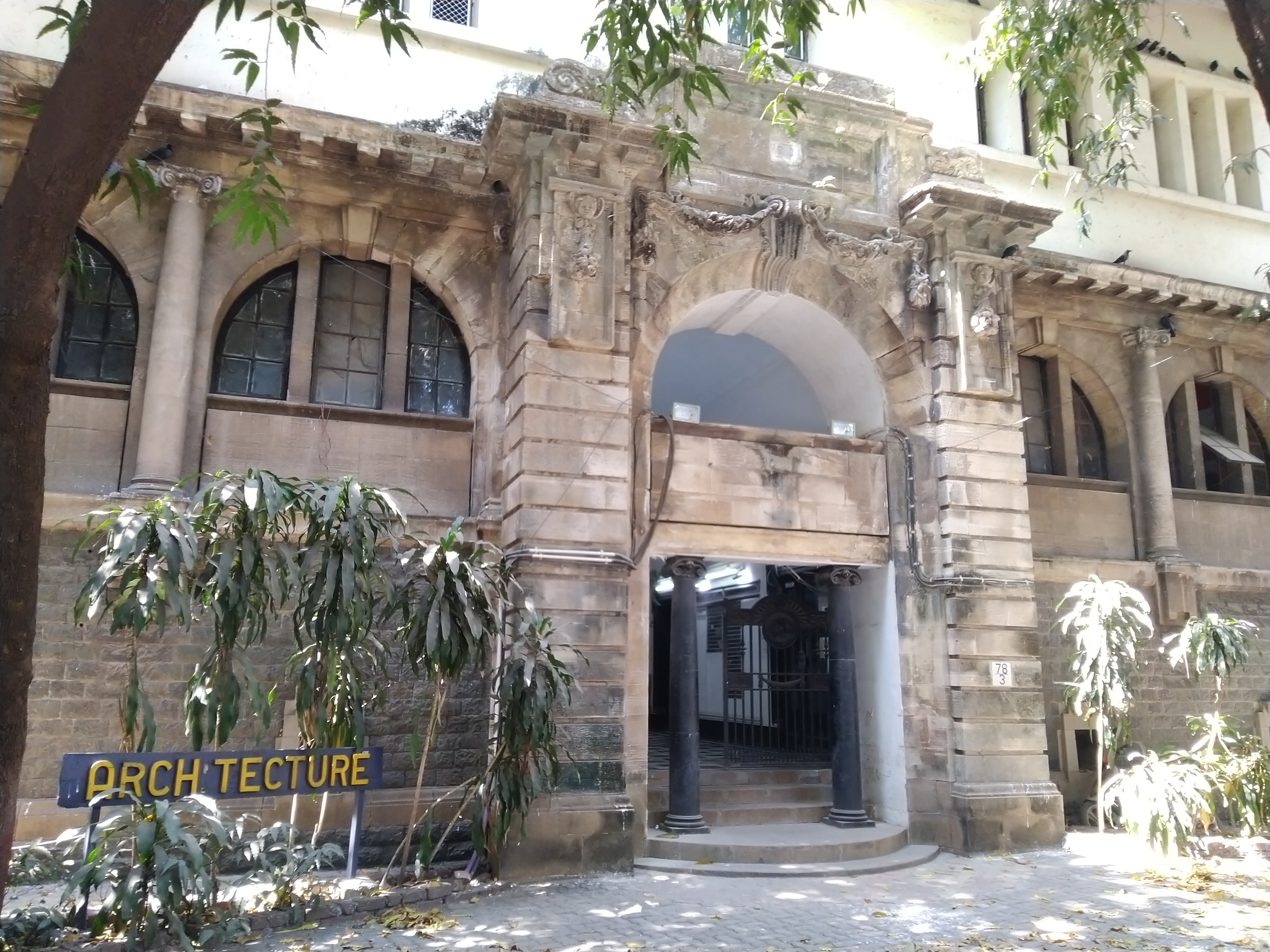
- Established: 1913; 113 years ago
- Affiliations: University of Mumbai
- Location: Mumbai, Maharashtra, India
- Website: Official Website

Sir J. J. College of Architecture is an architecture school located in downtown Mumbai (Bombay), affiliated to University of Mumbai in the state of Maharashtra, India. Sharing its premises with Sir J. J. School of Art and Sir J.J. School of Applied Art (now known as Commercial Art), it is now rented from Government of Maharashtra as per the deed of Sir Jamsetjee Jejeebhoy. The college occupies two buildings (commonly known as "Old Building" and "New Building"), housing the teaching and non teaching departments along with a small workshop area and canteen space. The Old Building is one of the heritage buildings in the campus.

In 2008, it was recognised as a participant under the United States Agency for International Development (USAID) ECO (Energy Conservation and Commercialisation) III Project by the Bureau of Energy Efficiency (BEE) — India.

It offers two courses namely, Bachelor of Architecture (undergraduate, B.Arch – 5 years) and Master of Architecture (postgraduate, M.Arch – 2 years). The B.Arch course intake of seats for every academic year is approximately 70 students. Every academic year begins in the month of August and ends in the month of April.

Every year, the school publishes a magazine known as "Shilpsagar" meaning ocean of crafts (shilp = craft, sagar = ocean).

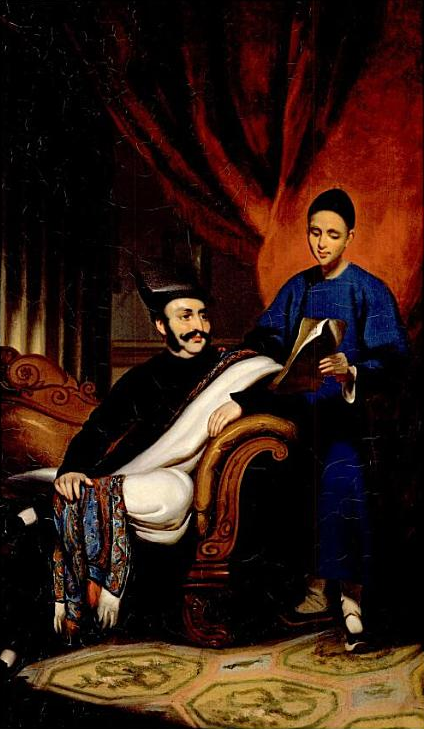
Sir Jamsetjee Jejeebhoy (1783–1859) portrait at the Sir J. J. School of Art

== History ==
Established in 1913, it was Asia's first architecture school, attached with Sir J. J. School of Art, itself established in 1896. In 1958, Sir J. J. School of Art was divided, with the Departments of Architecture and Applied Art becoming the Sir J. J. College of Architecture and Sir J.J. Institute of Applied Art respectively.

Sir J.J college of architecture is considered one of the foremost institutions of Architecture in India and is a recognized college of architecture all over the world. The origin can be traced to the founding of a Draftsman's Class, started with a view to produce men with a practical and really useful knowledge, fit to be employed in an Architect's office attached to the Sir J.J School of Arts in 1896, set up in the year 1857 by the erstwhile Government of Bombay from the grants made by the philanthropist Sir Jamshedji Jeejeebhoy, the first Baronet of Bombay.

The course was re-organized in 1913 to make it suitable for training in Architecture, and the Government Diploma Examination in Architecture was held subsequently. Robert Cable was appointed as the first Professor of Architecture and headed the department until 1923. Cable, and his most distinguished successors, Professor Claude Batley (1923–43), Professor C. M. Master (1943–48) and Professor Solomon Reuben (1948–59) took the architectural department into a new modernist phase. The entire course however, was again re-organized in 1936 and was made into a full-time Five-year course. In 1952, the department of Architecture was affiliated to the University of Bombay for teaching the courses leading to the Degree of Architecture. In 2013, the school completed 100 years of its establishment and has been consistently ranked the BEST architecture college in the country by national academic surveys.

The campus is a home to some of the oldest trees and plants in the city of Mumbai.

== Timeline ==
Year	Activity
1911/12	The Architectural school was in charge of the consulting architect to Government of Bombay and the course had been enlarged to one of four years. A commencement had also been made in foundling a Museum of architectural casts, models and materials was an indispensable part of the equipment of such a school.
1913	Course was re-organized.
1914	A member of staff of the Architectural Association School of Architecture in London, was appointed and joined his duties at the commencement of 1914. The Department of Architecture was steadily growing, Matriculation Examination became a necessary minimum qualification and the course of studies was supposed to lead to Degrees in Architecture equivalent to University Degree. The aim of the teachers was to reach the standards of the schools of the Royal Institute of British Architects. The World War I began and a serious setback was given to all the progressive ideas of the improvement of the Department of Architecture.
1916	The Government Diploma in Architecture was established but no student was able to obtain it, as the fifth year class, which was to provide the necessary training did not exist yet.
1917	A course of Architecture of five years was in force.
1920	Prof. Cable who was the head of the section tried his best to raise the standard of education in Architecture and in 1920, the Royal Institute of British Architects (RIBA) recognized the courses of Sir J.J College Of Architecture.
1922/23	The Diploma Examination in Architecture was held for the first time. The department was blossoming into a full-fledged branch of a recognized standard. Teaching all subjects to establish equality of status with the Diploma of the Royal Institute of British Architects (RIBA) became the ambition of the department. Prof. Claude Batley was appointed to post who continued the efforts.
1924	Recognition in India was not very hard to get as the standard of the college had already been raised to the best education available in the country. Teaching and practical work done by the students of The department was much better organized than in any other part of the country.
1929	The full day courses were started. It was only four years full-time course.
1936	A re-organized full-time course of five years was started.
1948/49	To meet the pressing demand for education in Architecture, the first and second year classes in Architectural Section were duplicated with an additional floor erected on the existing structure.
1949/50	The report of the Education Department read "The Architectural Section is recognized by the Royal Institute of British Architects and it is the only recognized School not only in India but in the whole of Asia."
1952	The university takes over the college from the Government.

== Notable alumni ==
- Anthony Almeida - Tanzanian modernist architect
- Achyut Kanvinde - Architect
- Balkrishna Doshi - Architect
- Minnette de Silva - Architect
- Remo Fernandes - Musician, Singer-songwriter, Actor
- Divita Rai - Miss Universe India 2022
- Abdulhusein M. Thariani - Architect with buildings in Mumbai (1930s-1947); Karachi (1940s - 1960s) and Dhaka (1950s-early 1960s). Also designed the Baitul Mukarram in Dhaka, Bangladesh.
