= Miss Diva 2021 =

9th edition of Miss Diva

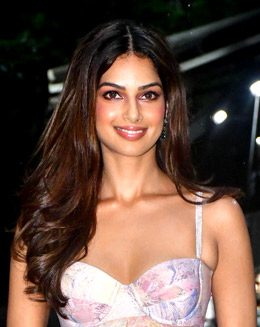
- Harnaaz Sandhu
- Date: September 30, 2021
- Presenters: Sachin Kumbhar; Ruhi Singh
- Entertainment: Malaika Arora; Sukriti Kakar; Prakriti Kakar
- Venue: Hyatt Regency Hotel, Mumbai
- Broadcaster: MTV
- Entrants: 20
- Placements: 10
- Winner: • Harnaaz Sandhu • Ritika Khatnani
- Photogenic: Anaika Nair

Miss Diva 2021 was the 9th edition of the Miss Diva beauty pageant which was held on 30 September 2021 in Hyatt Regency Hotel, Mumbai. The 20 shortlisted contestants from India competed in the pageant. Adline Castelino crowned Harnaaz Sandhu as her successor. After three months, she represented India at Miss Universe 2021 and became the 3rd Miss Universe from India to win the crown. Aavriti Choudhary crowned Ritika Khatnani as her successor. She represented India at Miss Supranational 2022 and won the title of Miss Supranational Asia 2022. Neha Jaiswal crowned Sonal Kukreja as 1st Runner-Up, whereas Kriti Sanon sashed all the remaining Runners-Up. Divita Rai was selected to represent India at Miss Universe 2022 and placed in the top 16.

This edition marked the longest period of time (20 months after Miss Diva 2020) that the organization has taken to hold an annual contest in contrast to its previous editions.

== Final results ==
Color keys

- The contestant won in an international pageant.
- The contestant was a runner-up in an international pageant.
- The contestant was a semi-finalist in an international pageant.
- Unplaced

Final results	Candidate	International placement
Miss Universe India 2021	Harnaaz Sandhu	Miss Universe 2021
Miss Diva Supranational 2022	Ritika Khatnani	Top 12 (Miss Supranational Asia 2022)
1st Runner Up	Sonal Kukreja	
2nd Runner Up	Divita Rai	
3rd Runner Up	Tarini Kalingarayar	
4th Runner Up	Ankita Singh	
Top 10	Ayesha Assadi; Nikita Tiwari; Pallabi Saikia; Siddhi Gupta	

== Sub-contests ==
=== Miss Beach Body ===
Result	Name
Winner	Ritika Khatnani
Top 6	Ayesha Assadi; Harnaaz Sandhu; Lavnaya Sangwan; Palomi Insan; Sonal Kukreja

=== Miss Beautiful Hair ===
Result	Name
Winner	Naveli Deshmukh
Top 5	Ritika Khatnani; Sachi Kudale; Sonal Kukreja; Tarini Kalingarayar

=== Miss Beautiful Skin ===
Result	Name
Winner	Harnaaz Sandhu
Top 5	Anaika Nair; Ritika Khatnani; Siddhi Gupta; Sonal Kukreja

=== Miss Beautiful Smile ===
Result	Name
Winner	Lavanya Sangwan
Top 5	Harnaaz Sandhu; Ritika Khatnani; Sachi Kudale; Siddhi Gupta

=== Miss Fashion Icon ===
Result	Name
Winner	Ayesha Assadi
Top 5	Ankita Singh; Nikita Tiwari; Pallabi Saikia; Siddhi Gupta

=== Miss Photogenic ===
Result	Name
Winner	Anaika Nair
Top 5	Ankita Singh; Divita Rai; Harnaaz Sandhu; Sonal Kukreja

=== Miss Talented ===
Result	Name
Winners	Pallabi Saikia; Palomi Insan
Top 5	Harnaaz Sandhu; Naina Upadhyaya; Ritika Khatnani

=== Other sub-contest winners ===
Sub-contest	Winner
Miss Top Model	Pallabi Saikia
Miss Congeniality	Sonal Kukreja
Miss Iron Maiden	Palomi Insan
Miss Active	Sonal Kukreja
Miss Lifestyle	Divita Rai
Miss IQ	Divita Rai
Miss Sudoku	Divita Rai
Miss Takatak Star	Palomi Insan

== Format ==
=== The pioneer ===
For the first time in Miss Diva's history, the organization lowered the height criteria from 5'5 "to 5'4". The organization now also allows trans women to enter the pageant meeting the criteria in certain.

Dipanjali Chhetri became the first trans woman to compete in the Miss Diva competition. She made it to the top 50 semifinalists.

=== Selection of candidates ===
In light of the pandemic situation that paralyzed the nation, the Miss Diva Organization decided to limit its operations to virtual projection and online interviews, thus allowing applicants to participate from the comfort of their homes. The organization opened the application to the public on June 11, 2021, until July 20, 2021.

After the initial auditions, applicants were shortlisted to a Top 50 list, and these candidates were summoned for several rounds of interviews, chaired by an elite bench of celebrities. Later, the selected contestants shortened down to top 20 finalists, including a wild card entry, chosen by public vote. These 20 finalists took part in the contest's boot-camp and were to compete in the final event to be held in Mumbai on 30 September 2021.

== Contestants ==
=== Top 20 ===
The following are the 20 official contestants:

Color key

- Declared as winner
- Ended as runner-up
- Ended as one of the finalists or semi-finalists

Nu.	Contestant	Age (Note: Ages at the time of the pageant)	Height	Hometown	Placement
1	Aishwarya Kamal	24	5 ft 7 in (1.70 m)	New Delhi	
2	Akshita Singh	21	5 ft 9 in (1.75 m)	Vadodara	
3	Anaika Nair	24	5 ft 6 in (1.68 m)	Mumbai	
4	Ankita Singh	22	5 ft 8.5 in (1.74 m)	Kolkata	4th Runner-up
5	Ayesha Assadi	21	5 ft 8 in (1.73 m)	Mumbai	Top 10
6	Divita Rai	23	5 ft 9 in (1.75 m)	Mumbai	2nd Runner-up
7	Harnaaz Sandhu	21	5 ft 9 in (1.75 m)	Chandigarh	Miss Diva Universe 2021
8	Lavanya Sangwan	22	5 ft 8 in (1.73 m)	Gurugram	
9	Naina Upadhyaya	21	5 ft 8 in (1.73 m)	Mumbai	
10	Naveli Deshmukh (Note: Replacement — Naveli Deshmukh was appointed to compete at Miss Diva 2021 by the Miss Diva organisation, as a replacement to Akshita Shetty due to unforeseen circumstances. Akshita Shetty was among the Top 20 finalists of the Miss Diva 2021.)	25	5 ft 8 in (1.73 m)	Aurangabad	
11	Nikita Tiwari	23	5 ft 9 in (1.75 m)	Mumbai	Top 10
12	Ojasvi Sharma	24	5 ft 7 in (1.70 m)	Delhi	
13	Pallabi Saikia	21	5 ft 9 in (1.75 m)	Digboi	Top 10
14	Palomi Insan	24	5 ft 4 in (1.63 m)	Noida	
15	Ritika Khatnani	19	5 ft 10 in (1.78 m)	Pune	Miss Diva Supranational 2022
16	Ruchi Chettri	20	5 ft 7 in (1.70 m)	Darjeeling	
17	Sachi Kudale	21	5 ft 7 in (1.70 m)	Pune	
18	Siddhi Gupta	25	5 ft 9 in (1.75 m)	Delhi	Top 10
19	Sonal Kukreja	23	5 ft 8 in (1.73 m)	Jaipur	1st Runner-up
20	Tarini Kalingarayar	22	5 ft 7.5 in (1.71 m)	Chennai	3rd Runner-up

=== Semifinalists ===
As in the previous edition, the winner of the Campus Princess contest will obtain a direct place in the Top 20 of Miss Diva 2021. Below are the Top 18 finalists of Campus Princess 2020. The list of finalists was announced in two parts, Part I and Part II on July 24 and 25, 2021 respectively. Miss Diva 2021 Top 50 was announced on 16 August 2021.

On August 23, 2021, the Top 20 and Top 5 Wild Card aspirants were announced. The top 5 wild card contenders will face a public online vote until August 30, 2021, and the one with the most votes will enter the Top 20.

- Advanced to Top 50
- Advanced to Top 20
- Chosen as Top 5 Wildcard entrants

Campuss Princess 2020 finalists
Miss Diva Top 50 semifinalists
Wildcard entrants - Top 5

S.No	Name	Hometown
1	Amrita Parihar	Madhya Pradesh
2	Ananya Bist	Dehradun
3	Ankita Singha	Guwahati
4	Anoushka Chauhan	Gandhinagar
5	Disha Patil	Nagpur
6	Himali Pareek	Rajasthan
7	Ishika Singh	Mumbai
8	Khushi Ajwani	Jaipur
9	Lavanya Sangwan	Gurugram
10	Mahekdeep Kaur	Amritsar
11	Mehak Vinayak	Chandigarh
12	Nimisha Dhote	Bhopal
13	Pankhuri Mehrotra	Mumbai
14	Ritvikka Dwivedi	Mumbai
15	Shibi Batar	Delhi
16	Shyna Choudhary	Pathankot
17	Vaibhavi Sharma	Uttarakhand
18	Vanshika Dawara	Jabalpur

S.No	Name	Hometown
1	Aavya Gupta	Mumbai
2	Aditi Jaswal	Dehradun
3	Aishwarya Kamal	Delhi
4	Akshita Shetty	Mumbai
5	Akshita Singh	Vadodara
6	Alankrita Shahi	Ghaziabad
7	Anaika Nair	Mumbai
8	Ankita Singh	Kolkata
9	Atasi Sindal	Bankura
10	Ayesha Assadi	Mumbai
11	Bhavana Sharma	Bengaluru
12	Dipanjali Chhetri	Delhi
13	Disha Patil	Nagpur
14	Divita Rai	Mumbai
15	Harnaaz Sandhu	Chandigarh
16	Heli Vyas	Mumbai
17	Ishika Singh	Mumbai
18	Jasmine Lazarus	Delhi
19	Jhanvi Sareen	Gurugram
20	Kanchan Khatana	Jaipur
21	Lavanya Gunasekar	Mumbai
22	Mansi Taxak	Mumbai
23	Mariam Paul	Thrissur
24	Marishca Rodrigues	Mumbai
25	Naina Upadhyaya	Mumbai

S.No	Name	Hometown
26	Naveli Deshmukh	Aurangabad
27	Nikita Thomas	Kochi
28	Nikita Tiwari	Mumbai
29	Nishi Bhardwaj	Delhi
30	Niveditha Rajan	Bengaluru
31	Ojasvi Sharma	Delhi
32	Pallabi Saikia	Digboi
33	Palomi Insan	Noida
34	Pranshu Singh Yadav	Seoni
35	Rajashree Dowarah	Dibrugarh
36	Rhiya Yadav	Mumbai
37	Ritika Khatnani	Pune
38	Ritvikka Dwivedi	Mumbai
39	Ruchi Chettri	Darjeeling
40	Rushali Yadav	Ajmer
41	Sachi Kudale	Pune
42	Shefali Sharma	Rewa
43	Shivangi Julka	Delhi
44	Shraddha Surve	Mumbai
45	Siddhi Gupta	Delhi
46	Snehapriya Roy	Mumbai
47	Sonal Kukreja	Jaipur
48	Tarini Kalingarayar	Chennai
49	Vaishnavi Hodalkar	Pune
50	VM Mansi	Kochi

S.No	Name	Hometown
1	Mariam Paul	Thrissur
2	Naveli Deshmukh	Aurangabad
3	Palomi Insan	Noida
4	Rushali Yadav	Ajmer
5	Vaishnavi Hodalkar	Pune

== Judges ==
=== Final night ===
- Shivan Bhatia - fashion designer
- Narresh Kukreja - fashion designer
- Ashwiny Iyer Tiwari - filmmaker, writer and author
- Kriti Sanon - actress
- Pankaj Advani - billiards and snooker player
- Kanika Kapoor - singer
- Angad Bedi - actor

=== For Top 20 finalists ===
- Srishti Sawhney - President & Global brand director, Pulp & Fibre Business - Aditya Birla Group
- Natasha Grover - National Director, Brand & Operation Head - Femina Miss India
- Sushant Divgikar - Mr. Gay India 2014, performing artist, drag icon, singer, equal rights champion & motivational speaker
- Bhawna Rao - Designer
- Abhishek Sharma - designer
- Saisha Shinde - designer
- Rani Mol - Head, Times Talent
- Supreet Bedi - TV anchor, celebrity host
- Bharat Gupta - fashion consultant, creative director, and stylist
- Noyonita Lodh - Miss Diva 2014
- Neha Jaiswal - Miss Diva 2020 Runner-up

=== For Top 50 semifinalists ===
The following eight judges determined the 50 semifinalists.

- Bharat Gupta - fashion consultant, creative director, and stylist
- Srinidhi Shetty - Miss Supranational 2016
- Bianca Louzado - hair and makeup expert
- Neha Jaiswal - Miss Diva 2020 Runner-up
- Jitesh Thakur - Mister Supranational 2016 2nd Runner-up
- Noyonita Lodh - Miss Diva 2014
- Sushant Divgikar - performing artist, singer, equal rights champion, and motivational speaker
- Shefali Sood - Miss Diva Supranational 2019

== Crossovers & returnees ==
Contestants who previously competed in previous editions of Liva Miss Diva and other local and international beauty pageants with their respective placements.

=== National pageants ===
Miss Diva

- 2015: Naveli Deshmukh (2nd Runner Up)
- 2018: Aishwarya Kamal

Femina Miss India

- 2015: Naveli Deshmukh (Top 10)
- 2019: Harnaaz Sandhu (Top 12)
- 2019: Siddhi Gupta (Top 12)

Miss Teen India

- 2018: Ritika Khatnani (Winner)

=== International pageants ===
Miss Teen International

- 2018: Ritika Khatnani (1st Runner Up)
