= Sonal Kukreja =

Indian model, dancer and beauty pageant titleholder (born 1997)

- Born: 14 October 1997 (age 28); New Delhi, India
- Education: Pennsylvania State University
- Occupation: Model
- Height: 1.75 m (5 ft 9 in)
- Beauty pageant titleholder
- Title: Miss Diva Supranational 2024
- Hair color: Dark Brown
- Eye color: Brown
- Major competitions: Miss Diva 2021; (1st Runner-Up); Miss Diva 2023; (Winner – Miss Diva Supranational 2024); Miss Supranational 2024; (Top 12)

Sonal Kukreja (born 14 October 1997) is an Indian model and beauty pageant titleholder who was crowned Miss Supranational India 2024. At the Miss Supranational 2024 pageant held in Poland on 17 July 2024, she represented India and secured a spot in the Top 12, marking the fourth consecutive year that has placed in the Top 12 and eleventh overall placement for India.

She previously participated in Miss Diva 2021 and was crowned Miss Diva Runner up.

== Pageantry ==
=== Miss Diva 2021 ===
In August 2021, Sonal was one of the Top 20 delegates for the Miss Diva 2021 pageant. At the finals held on 30 September 2021, she was crowned as the 1st Runner-up to Harnaaz Sandhu, who later went on to win the Miss Universe 2021 title.

During the competition, Sonal won the following sub-title awards:

- Miss Active
- Miss Congeniality
- Top 5 – Miss Beautiful Hair
- Top 5 – Miss Beautiful Skin
- Top 5 – Miss Photogenic
- Top 6 – Miss Beach Body

=== Miss Diva 2023 ===
On 16 August 2023, Sonal was confirmed as one of the 16 official contestants for the Miss Diva 2023 competition.

During the competition, Sonal was nominated for the following sub-title awards:

- Top 5 – Miss Photogenic
- Top 6 – Miss Rampwalk

At the grand finale held on 28 August 2023 at The LaLit, Mumbai, Sonal was crowned by outgoing Miss Diva Supranational 2023, Pragnya Ayyagari as Miss Diva Supranational 2024.

Miss Supranational 2024

Sonal competed at the 15th Miss Supranational where she placed among the Top 12 finalists, finishing 11th in the overall competition. Harashta Haifa Zahra of Indonesia won the pageant.

Awards and achievements
Preceded by Neha Jaiswal	Miss Diva 1st Runner-up; 2021	Succeeded by Ojasvi Sharma
Preceded by Pragnya Ayyagari	Miss Diva Supranational; 2023	Succeeded by Ayushree Malik
