= Miss Diva =

National beauty pageant competition in India

- Predecessor: I Am She - Miss Universe India (2010 – 2012); Femina Miss India (1964 – 2009)
- Successor: Miss Universe India
- Formation: 2013; 13 years ago
- Purpose: Beauty pageant
- Headquarters: Mumbai
- Location: India
- Official language: English
- Parent organization: Worldwide Media Pvt. Ltd.
- Affiliations: Miss Universe; (2013 – 2023); Miss Supranational; Miss Cosmo

The Miss Diva is a national beauty pageant in India that primarily selects India's representatives to Miss Supranational and Miss Cosmo.

From 2013 to 2023, the primary winner of Miss Diva represented India at Miss Universe, one of the big Four international beauty pageants. However, in 2024, the organization withdrew its Miss Universe license. Miss Diva Universe 2023 Shweta Sharda, was the last representative sent to Miss Universe 2023 by the Miss Diva organization.

== History ==
Number of wins under Miss Diva
Pageant	Wins
Miss Supranational	2
Miss Cosmo	0
Miss Universe	1
Miss Asia Pacific World	1
Miss Earth	0
Miss International	0

Following the transfer of the Miss Universe franchise by the Miss Universe Organization to Bennett, Coleman and Co., a distinct Miss Diva pageant was established to select India's representatives for Miss Universe. Previously, Femina Miss India designated its winner to compete at Miss Universe. However, in 2010, Tantra Entertainment Private Limited, in partnership with former Miss Universe and renowned Bollywood actress Sushmita Sen, launched a separate pageant, I Am She-Miss Universe India, to send Indian delegates to Miss Universe.

Following 2012, Sushmita Sen and Tantra Entertainment relinquished the Miss Universe license, prompting the Femina Miss India Organization to assume rights for Miss Diva 2013.

The inaugural Miss Diva pageant took place on 5 September 2013, in Mumbai. Fourteen finalists, meticulously selected from across the nation, vied for the coveted crown at the grand finale. Manasi Moghe, hailing from Mumbai, was declared the first-ever "Miss Diva Universe 2013" by the esteemed Zeenat Aman, Miss Asia Pacific 1970, and a renowned Bollywood actress. Gurleen Grewal, representing Punjab, was crowned "Miss Diva International 2013" by Sahar Biniaz, Miss Universe Canada 2012. Finally, Srishti Rana from Faridabad received the title of "Miss Diva Asia Pacific World 2013" from Bollywood's celebrated actress, Raveena Tandon.

In 2019, Liva Fluid Fashion secured the sponsorship rights for the Miss Diva pageant. The inaugural edition under their patronage was scheduled for 2020. As there was no pageant held in 2019, the Miss India Organization appointed Indian representatives for international competitions. Vartika Singh and Shefali Sood were selected to compete in Miss Universe 2019 and Miss Supranational 2019, respectively.

In 2024, Miss Diva organization withdrew the license to the Miss Universe organization in 2024 because they felt the organization had changed and needed to address internal issues. The Miss Diva organization has stated they will return to the Miss Universe once the issues has been resolved.

After withdrawing the Miss Universe license, Miss Diva rebranded its 2024 pageant as "LIVA Miss Diva 2.0.", and introduced two new titles: Miss Diva Content Creator and Miss Diva Fashion Designer. In keeping with tradition, the Miss Diva Supranational title continues to be awarded, as it has in previous editions.

In 2025, the Miss Diva organization obtained the national license for Miss Cosmo, an international pageant based in Vietnam. One of the winners of Miss Diva 2024 will represent India at the second edition of the Miss Cosmo pageant, scheduled to take place in Vietnam in 2025.

== International pageants ==
Current Franchises
Membership	Year
Miss Supranational	2013 – Present
Miss Cosmo	2025 – Present
Former Franchises
Membership	Year
Miss Universe	2013 – 2023
Miss Earth	2014
Miss International	2013
Miss Asia Pacific World	2013

In 2013, Srishti Rana won Miss Asia Pacific World 2013 and became the second Indian to win the title. She was crowned by the outgoing titleholder Himangini Singh Yadu from India as well. This gave India a back-to-back victory in the pageant. Rana is the first ever Miss Diva winner to win any international title. In 2014, India again won the pageant, making it the only country to win any international pageant three years in a row. (Many other countries such as South Africa have won consecutive pageant awards).

In 2014, Asha Bhat competed at the sixth edition of Miss Supranational and won the pageant. Asha is the first Indian and second Asian to win the said pageant. In 2016, Srinidhi Ramesh Shetty was sent to Miss Supranational in Krynica-Zdrój, Poland and she won the title of Miss Supranational 2016. India is the first country to win Miss Supranational twice and both delegates were sent by Miss Diva.

In 2021, Miss Diva Universe 2020 Adline Castelino, represented India and was third runner-up at Miss Universe 2020, held in Hollywood, Florida, United States. She achieved India's highest placement at Miss Universe since Lara Dutta, who won Miss Universe 2000. She also achieved India's third runner-up position at Miss Universe after 55 years.

In December 2021, Miss Diva Universe 2021 Harnaaz Sandhu, represented India and won at Miss Universe 2021, held in Eilat, Israel.

== Editions ==
Below is the complete list of Miss Diva editions.

Year	Date	Miss Diva	Entrants	Presenters	Pageant venue	Broadcaster
2013	5 September 2013	Manasi Moghe	14	Mantra, Vivan Bhatena	Westin Mumbai Garden City, Mumbai	Colors TV
2014	14 October 2014	Noyonita Lodh	15	Lara Dutta	Westin Mumbai Garden City, Mumbai	Zee Café, Zoom
2015	14 October 2015	Urvashi Rautela	16	Cyrus Sahukar	Hotel Sahara Star, Mumbai	Zee Café, Zoom TV, Romedy Now
2016	1 September 2016	Roshmitha Harimurthy	15	Lara Dutta, Vir Das	Sardar Vallabhbhai Patel Indoor Stadium, Mumbai	Colors Infinity
2017	11 October 2017	Shraddha Shashidhar	15	Malaika Arora, Yudhishtir Urs	Hotel Sahara Star, Mumbai	Colors Infinity
2018	31 August 2018	Nehal Chudasama	19	Sonakshi Sinha, Tiger Shroff	National Sports Club of India, Mumbai	Colors Infinity
2019	26 September 2019	Vartika Singh	None (Direct appointment)	Shamita Singha	Rocky Star Cocktail Bar, Mumbai	Official Social Media Handle
2020	22 February 2020	Adline Castelino	20	Aparshakti Khurana, Malaika Arora	Yash Raj Studio, Mumbai	MTV India, Zoom TV
2021	30 September 2021	Harnaaz Sandhu	12	Malaika Arora, Prakriti Kakar, Sukriti Kakar	Hyatt Regency Hotel, Mumbai	MTV India
2022	30 October 2022	Divita Rai	None (Direct appointment)	Sachin Kumbhar	Famous Studios, Mumbai	Voot
2023	27 August 2023	Shweta Sharda	16	Sachin Kumbhar, Supreet Bedi	The LaLiT, Mumbai	JioCinema
2024	7 March 2025	Ayushree Malik; Vipra Mehta	8	Nehal Chudasama, Tanuj Virwani	The LaLiT, Mumbai	JioHotstar, Zoom TV
2025	21 December 2025	Avni Gupta; Avani Kakekochhi	8	Sachiin Kumbhaar, Pooja Bhamrrah	Aurika Hotel, Mumbai	Zoom TV
2026	29 November 2026	TBA	10	TBA	TBA	YouTube

== Representatives at international pageants ==
- : Declared as winner
- : Ended as runner-up or top 5/6 qualification
- : Ended as one of the finalists/semi-finalists
- : Unplaced but given special award(s)

=== Miss Supranational ===
The Times Group acquired the rights to send India's representatives to Miss Supranational in 2013. From the year 2016 to 2020, the first runner-up of Miss Diva is announced as Miss Supranational India.

Year	Delegate	Age^{[α]}	Hometown	Competition performance	
Year	Delegate	Age^{[α]}	Hometown	Placements	Special award(s)
2013	Vijaya Sharma	20	Delhi	Top 20	
2014	Asha Bhat	22	Karnataka	Miss Supranational 2014	2 Special Awards: Miss Talented; Top 5 – Miss Internet
2015	Aafreen Vaz	24	Karnataka	Top 10	4 Special Awards: Miss Supranational Asia and Oceania; 1st Runner Up – Miss Internet; Top 10 – Miss Supranational Top Model; Top 10 – Best National Costume
2016	Srinidhi Shetty	24	Karnataka	Miss Supranational 2016	2 Special Awards: Miss Supranational Asia and Oceania; 3rd Runner-up – Miss Mobstar
2017	Peden Ongmu Namgyal	22	Sikkim	Top 25	2 Special Awards: 2nd Runner-up – Miss Talent; 3rd Runner-up – Best in Swimsuit
2018	Aditi Hundia	21	Rajasthan	Top 25	
2019	Shefali Sood	24	Uttar Pradesh	Top 25	1 Special Award: Top 10 – Miss Influencer
2021	Aavriti Choudhary	23	Madhya Pradesh	Top 12	
2022	Ritika Khatnani	20	Maharashtra	Top 12	5 Special Awards: Miss Supranational Asia; Miss Photogenic; Top 3 – Miss Talent; Top 10 – Supra Influencer; Top 11 – Top Model
2023	Pragnya Ayyagari	21	Telangana	Top 12	4 Special Awards: Miss Supranational Asia; Top 5 – Supra Chat; Top 7 – Miss Talent; Top 10 – Supra Fan-Vote
2024	Sonal Kukreja	26	Rajasthan	Top 12	1 Special Award: Top 13 – Miss Influencer
2025	Ayushree Malik	19	Delhi	Top 24	2 Special Awards: Winner – Supra Chat; Top 20 – Miss Influencer
2026	Avni Gupta	22	Uttar Pradesh	Top 12	
2027	TBA				

Note – Due to the impact of COVID-19 pandemic, no pageant held in 2020

=== Miss Cosmo ===
WorldWide Media Pvt. Ltd., the parent organization of the Miss Diva pageant, acquired the national license for Miss Cosmo in 2025.

Year	Delegate	Age^{[α]}	Hometown	Competition performance	
Year	Delegate	Age^{[α]}	Hometown	Placements	Special award(s)
2025	Vipra Mehta	21	Rajasthan	Top 21	4 Special Awards: Top 3 – Cosmo Social Ambassador; Top 5 – Best in Swimsuit; Top 17 – Best Carnival Costume; Top 26 – Cosmo Impactful Beauty Award
2026	Avani Kakekochhi	25	Karnataka	TBA	
2027	TBA				

== Previous franchises ==
Below are the names of delegates and the international pageants whose franchise was previously owned by the Times Group. Femina Miss India/Miss Diva no longer selects India's representatives for the below listed pageants.

=== Miss Universe ===
Year	Delegate	Age^{[α]}	Hometown	Competition performance	
Year	Delegate	Age^{[α]}	Hometown	Placements	Special award(s)
2013	Manasi Moghe	22	Maharashtra	Top 10	
2014	Noyonita Lodh	21	Karnataka	Top 15	1 Special Award: Top 5 – Best National Costume
2015	Urvashi Rautela	21	Uttarakhand	Unplaced	
2016	Roshmitha Harimurthy	22	Karnataka	Unplaced	
2017	Shraddha Shashidhar	21	Tamil Nadu	Unplaced	
2018	Nehal Chudasama	22	Maharashtra	Unplaced	
2019	Vartika Singh	26	Uttar Pradesh	Top 20	
2020	Adline Castelino	22	Karnataka	3rd Runner-up	
2021	Harnaaz Sandhu	21	Punjab	Miss Universe 2021	
2022	Divita Rai	25	Karnataka	Top 16	
2023	Shweta Sharda	23	Punjab	Top 20	

=== Miss International ===
From 1991, The Times Group had the franchise for selecting India's representatives to Miss International. In 2013, Miss Diva runner-up was sent as India's delegate.

Year	Delegate	Age^{[α]}	Hometown	Competition performance	
Year	Delegate	Age^{[α]}	Hometown	Placements	Special award(s)
2013	Gurleen Grewal	21	Punjab	Unplaced	1 Special Award: 1st Runner Up – Miss Internet

=== Miss Earth ===
Since the first edition of Miss Earth in 2001, to the year 2013, The Times Group selected India's representatives to the pageant. A runner-up of Miss Diva was sent to Miss Earth in the year 2014.

Year	Delegate	Age^{[α]}	Hometown	Competition performance	
Year	Delegate	Age^{[α]}	Hometown	Placements	Special award(s)
2014	Alankrita Sahai	20	New Delhi	Unplaced	8 Special Awards: (gold) – Miss Earth Pagudpud; (gold) – Miss Hannah's Beach Resort Best in Casual Wear; (gold) – Best Evening Gown; (silver) – Miss Photogenic; (silver) – Besuty for a Cause; (bronze) – Best in Swimsuit; (bronze) – Best National Costume; Top 10 – Miss Eco - Beauty

=== Miss Asia Pacific World ===
The Times Group selected representatives for this pageant in 2013 and 2014. Miss Diva 2013 runner-up, Srishti Rana won the title of Miss Asia Pacific World 2013.

Year	Delegate	Age^{[α]}	Hometown	Competition performance	
Year	Delegate	Age^{[α]}	Hometown	Placements	Special award(s)
2013	Srishti Rana	23	Maharashtra	Miss Asia Pacific World 2013	1 Special Award: Best National Costume Miss Personality Miss Talent

== Titleholders ==
Year	Title	Titleholder
2026	Miss Diva Supranational	TBA
2026	Miss Diva Cosmo	TBA
2026	1st Runner Up	TBA
2026	2nd Runner Up	TBA
2026	Miss Diva Fashion Designer	TBA
2026	Miss Diva Content Creator	TBA
2025	Miss Diva Supranational	Avni Gupta
2025	Miss Diva Cosmo	Avani Kakekochhi
2025	1st Runner Up	Anoushka Chauhan
2025	2nd Runner Up	Anushka Singh
2025	Miss Diva Fashion Designer	Aishwarya V
2025	Miss Diva Content Creator	Monica D'Souza
2024	Miss Diva Supranational	Ayushree Malik
2024	Miss Diva Cosmo	Vipra Mehta
2024	Runner Up	Yogita Rathore
2024	Miss Diva Fashion Designer	Sudhruti Padhiary
2024	Miss Diva Content Creator	Ananya Praveen
2023	Miss Universe India	Shweta Sharda
2023	Miss Supranational India	Sonal Kukreja
2023	Runner Up	Trisha Shetty
2022	Miss Universe India	Divita Rai
2022	Miss Supranational India	Pragnya Ayyagari
2022	Miss Popular Choice	Ojasvi Sharma
2021	Miss Universe India	Harnaaz Sandhu
2021	Miss Supranational India	Ritika Khatnani
2021	1st Runner Up	Sonal Kukreja
2021	2nd Runner Up	Divita Rai
2021	3rd Runner Up	Tarini Kalingarayar
2021	4th Runner Up	Ankita Singh
2020	Miss Universe India	Adline Castelino
2020	Miss Supranational India	Aavriti Choudhary
2020	Runner Up	Neha Jaiswal
2019	Miss Universe India	Vartika Singh
2019	Miss Supranational India	Shefali Sood
2018	Miss Universe India	Nehal Chudasama
2018	Miss Supranational India	Aditi Hundia
2018	Runner-up	Roshni Sheoran
2017	Miss Universe India	Shraddha Shashidhar
2017	Miss Supranational India	Peden Ongmu Namgyal
2017	Runner-up	Apeksha Porwal
2016	Miss Universe India	Roshmitha Harimurthy
2016	Miss Supranational India	Srinidhi Shetty
2016	Runner-up	Aaradhana Buragohain
2015	Miss Universe India	Urvashi Rautela
2015	1st Runner-up	Natasha Assadi
2015	2nd Runner-up	Naveli Deshmukh
2014	Miss Universe India	Noyonita Lodh
2014	Miss Earth India	Alankrita Sahai
2014	Miss Supranational India	Asha Bhat
2013	Miss Universe India	Manasi Moghe
2013	Miss International India	Gurleen Grewal
2013	Miss Asia Pacific World India	Srishti Rana

=== Gallery of winners ===
==== Miss Diva Universe ====
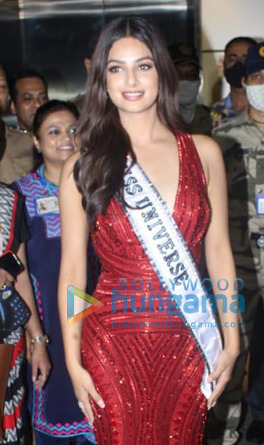
Harnaaz Kaur Sandhu
Miss Universe 2021 and Miss Diva Universe 2021

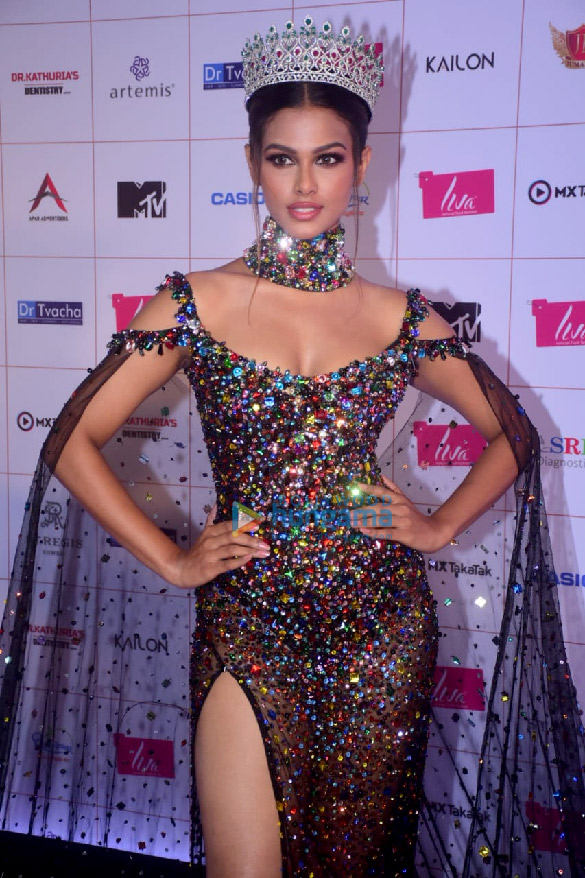
Adline Quadros Castelino
Miss Diva Universe 2020

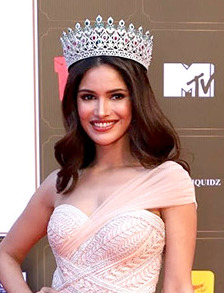
Vartika Singh
Miss Diva Universe 2019

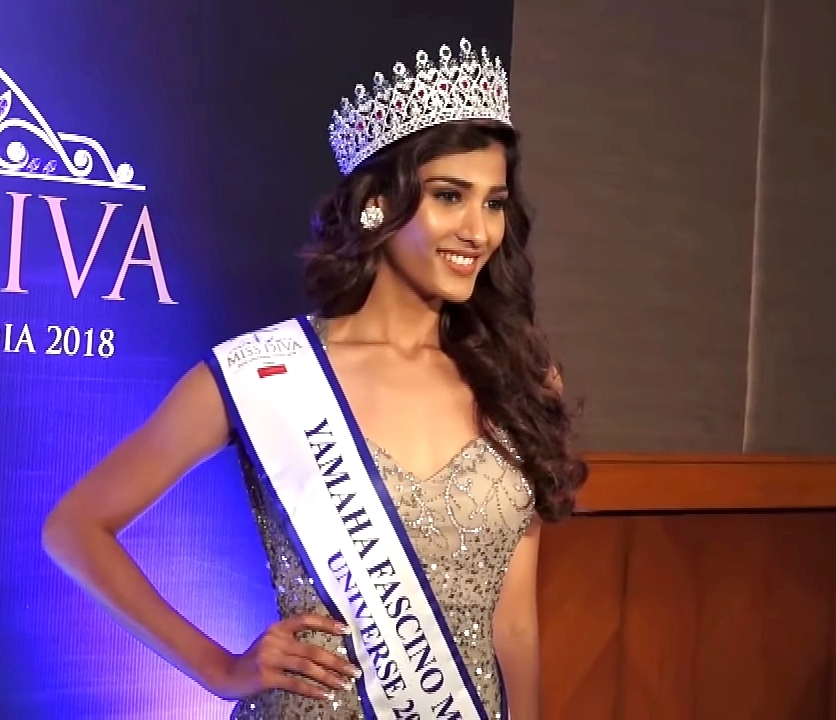
Nehal Chudasama
Miss Diva Universe 2018

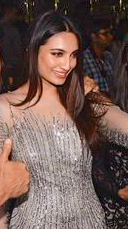
Roshmitha Harimurthy
Miss Diva Universe 2016

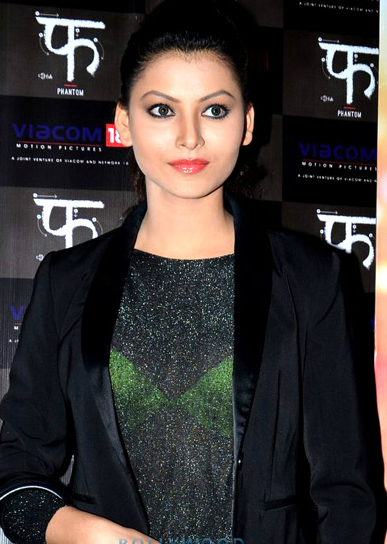
Urvashi Rautela
Miss Diva Universe 2015

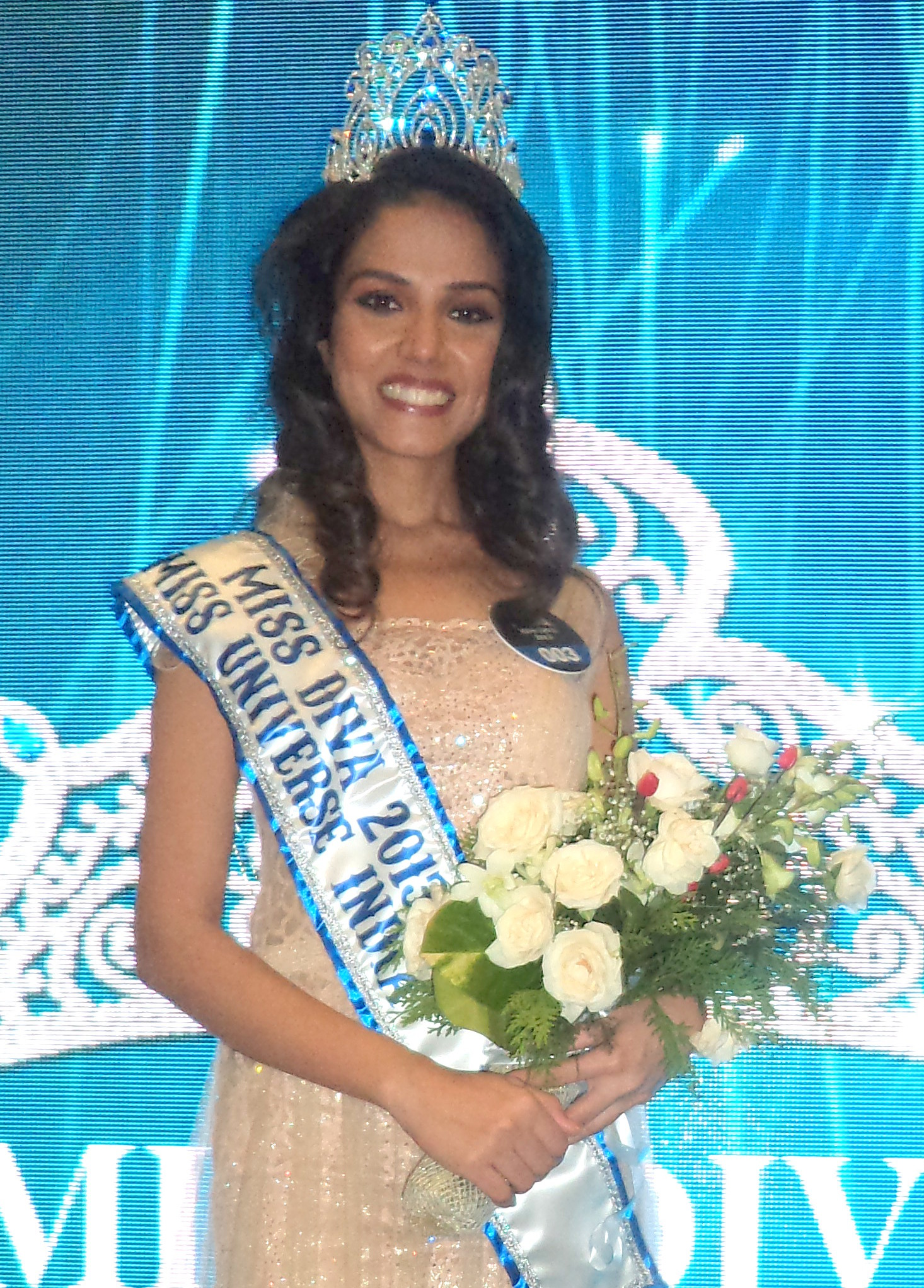
Manasi Moghe
Miss Diva Universe 2013

==== Miss Diva Supranational ====
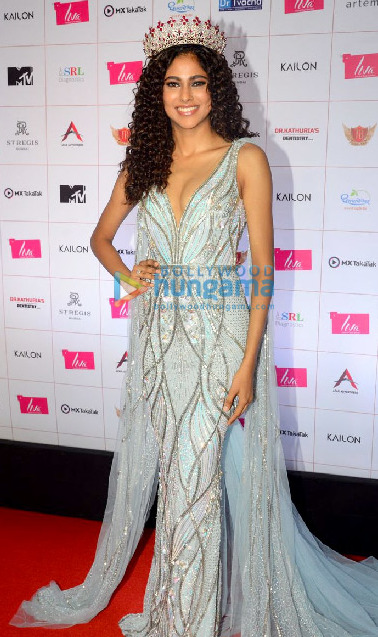
Aavriti Choudhary
Miss Diva Supranational 2020

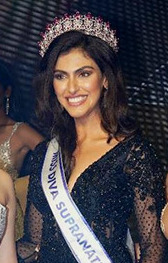
Shefali Sood
Miss Diva Supranational 2019

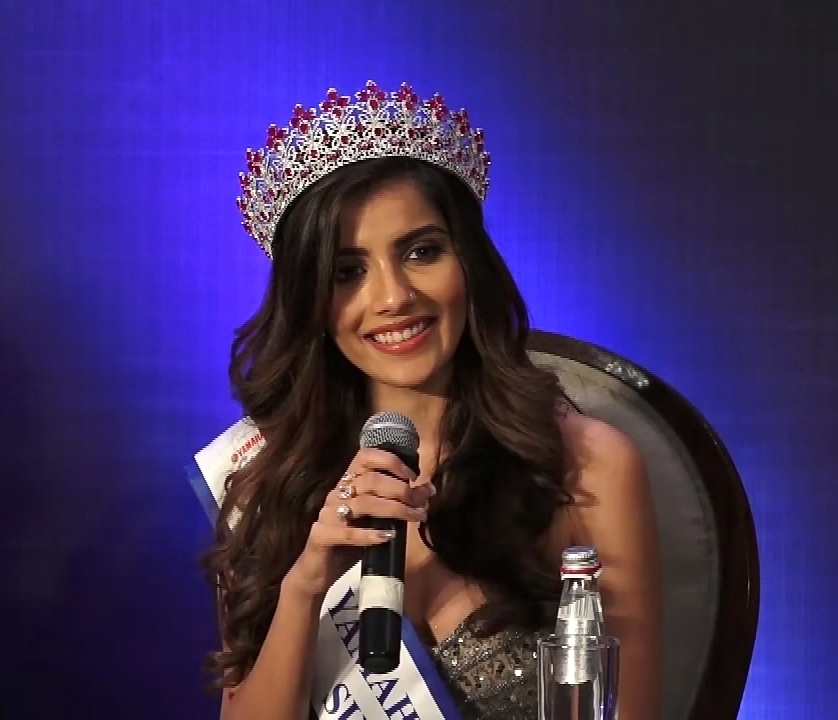
Aditi Hundia
Miss Diva Supranational 2018

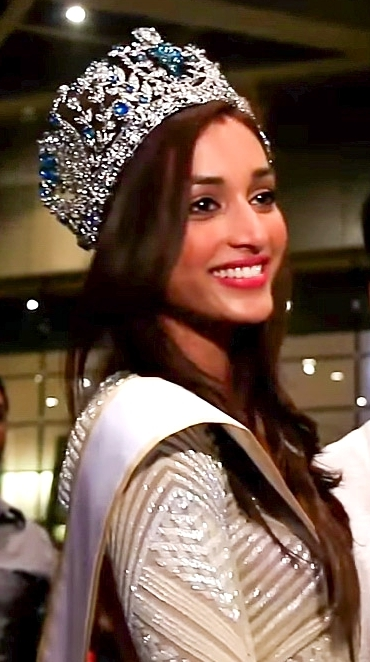
Srinidhi Shetty
Miss Diva Supranational 2016 and Miss Supranational 2016

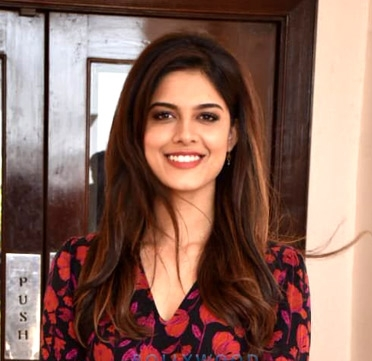
Asha Bhat
Miss Diva Supranational 2014 and Miss Supranational 2014

== See also ==
- Miss Divine Beauty
- List of Indian representatives at international male beauty pageants
- List of beauty pageants
