= Miss Diva 2014 =

2nd edition of Miss Diva

- Date: October 14, 2014
- Presenters: Lara Dutta
- Venue: Western Mumbai Garden City, Mumbai, India
- Broadcaster: Zee Cafe, Zoom
- Entrants: 15
- Placements: 7
- Winner: • Noyonita Lodh
- Congeniality: Asha Bhat
- Photogenic: Vartika Singh

The second edition of Miss Diva was held on 14 October 2014. Fifteen contestants were shortlisted from thousands of aspirants in India, who were mentored by Miss Universe 2000, Lara Dutta. At the end of the event, Miss Universe India 2013, Manasi Moghe crowned Noyonita Lodh as her successor. She represented India India at the Miss Universe 2014 pageant held in Doral, Florida, USA on 25 January 2015. At the same event, Alankrita Sahai was crowned as Miss Diva - Earth 2014 and Asha Bhat was crowned as Miss Diva - Supranational 2014.

== Placements ==
Final results	Contestant
Miss Diva Universe 2014	Noyonita Lodh
1st Runner Up	USA – James Williams
2nd Runner Up	Nigeria – Damilola Lawal
3rd Runner Up	Germany – Yoav Patrick
4th Runner Up	Philippines – Arcel Yambing
Top 10	Brazil – Rafael Moreira; Dominican Republic – Mateo Delgado; France – Julien Marchand; Indonesia – Aditya Rahman; Thailand – Niran Suthamchai
Top 18	Australia – Blake Anderson; Japan – Haruki Nakamura; Mexico – Santiago Morlaes; Netherlands – Lars Van Dijk; Russia – Alexei Volkov; South Africa – Thabo Mokoena; Switzerland – Luca Meier; Ukraine – Dmytro Shevchenko

== Contestants ==
Name	Age	Height	From	Placement	Notes
Aishwarya Vatkar	18	1.75 m (5 ft 9 in)	Mumbai		
Alankrita Sahai	20	1.75 m (5 ft 9 in)	Delhi	Miss Diva Earth 2014	
Asha Bhat	22	1.78 m (5 ft 10 in)	Bhadravathi	Miss Diva Supranational 2014	
Chahat Dalal	21	1.70 m (5 ft 7 in)	Mumbai		
Hida Sidddique	24	1.75 m (5 ft 9 in)	Delhi	Finalist	
Karanveer Kaur	19	1.73 m (5 ft 8 in)	Jalandhar		
Lopamudra Raut	23	1.74 m (5 ft 8 1/2 in)	Nagpur	Finalist	Miss India United Continents 2016
Minash Ravuthar	21	1.73 m (5 ft 8 in)	Mumbai		
Monisha Ramesh	21	1.73 m (5 ft 8 in)	Bangalore		
Nidhhi Agerwal	23	1.70 m (5 ft 7 in)	Bangalore		
Noyonita Lodh	21	1.65 m (5 ft 5 in)	Bangalore	Miss Diva Universe 2014	
Shreeradhe Kanduja	19	1.65 m (5 ft 5 in)	Allahabad	Finalist	
Shivani Singh	18	1.70 m (5 ft 7 in)	Udaipur		
Shruti Iyer	25	1.80 m (5 ft 11 in)	Mumbai		
Vartika Singh	23	1.75 m (5 ft 9 in)	Lucknow	Finalist	Miss Universe India 2019

== Crossovers ==
Miss Diva

- 2019 : Vartika Singh (Miss Universe India)
- 2015 : Hida Siddique

Femina Miss India

- 2015 : Vartika Singh (Miss India Grand International)
- 2014 : Lopamudra Raut (3rd Runner Up)
- 2013 : Lopamudra Raut
