= Miss Diva 2020 =

Beauty pageant in Mumbai, India

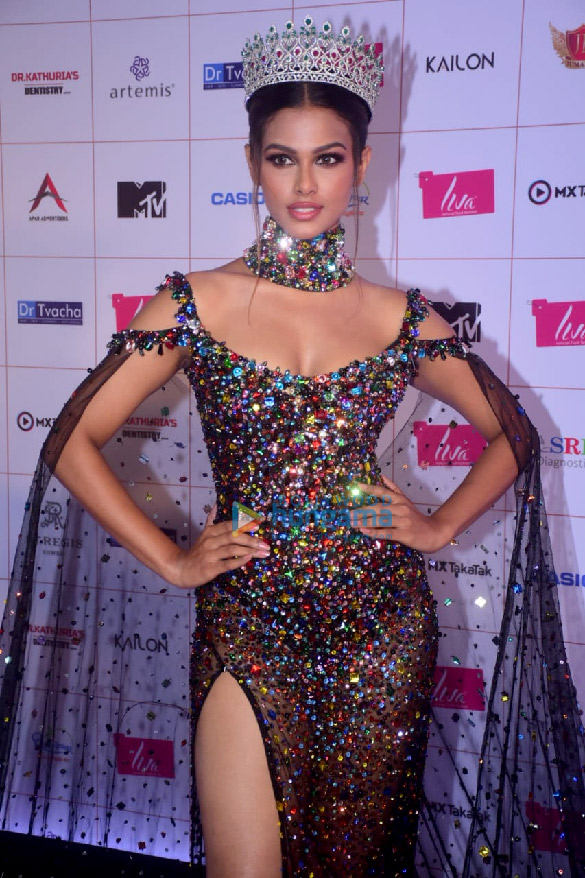
- Adline Castelino
- Date: 22 February 2020
- Presenters: Aparshakti Khurana; Malaika Arora
- Entertainment: Sonakshi Sinha; Mika Singh; Shahid Kapoor
- Venue: Yash Raj Studio, Andheri West, Mumbai, India
- Broadcaster: MTV India; Zoom
- Entrants: 20
- Placements: 10
- Winner: Adline Castelino; Aavriti Choudhary

Miss Diva 2020 was the eighth edition of the Miss Diva beauty pageant held on 22 February 2020. A total of 20 contestants were shortlisted from auditions in India. Vartika Singh crowned Adline Castelino as her successor and she represented India at Miss Universe 2020. Shefali Sood crowned Aavriti Choudhary as her successor and she represented India at Miss Supranational 2021. Miss Diva 2018 runner up Roshni Sheoran crowned Neha Jaiswal as her successor. Anntonia Porsild, Miss Supranational 2019 attended the event. This was the first Miss Diva pageant under Liva Fluid Fashion.

== Background ==
In 2019, Liva Fluid Fashion acquired the title sponsorship rights for Miss Diva. On 11 November 2019, the organization announced in a press conference that the pageant will be held in February 2020. Contestants were selected through auditions in various cities across the country. Shortlisted contestants went through a final round of auditions in Mumbai where the top finalists were selected. Miss Universe 2000 Lara Dutta served as the mentor.

=== Format ===
A new format was introduced by the organization. Top 10 contestants were selected based on their performance in the preliminary segment and closed door interview. The top 10 contestants had an opportunity to speak about themselves in an opening statement. They further competed in swimsuit and evening gown rounds to determine the final five. A common question was asked to all the top five contestants. They were finalized into top three.

== Contestants ==
The following were the 20 contestants participating in the Liva Miss Diva 2020:

Color key

- Declared as Winner
- Ended as Runner-up
- Ended as one of the Finalists or Semi-finalists

Nu.	Contestant	Age (Note: Ages at the time of the pageant)	Height	Hometown	Placement
1	Aavriti Choudhary	21	5 ft 7 in (1.70 m)	Jabalpur	Miss Supranational India 2021
2	Adline Castelino	21	5 ft 6 in (1.68 m)	Udupi	Miss Universe India 2020
3	Anisha Sharma	23	5 ft 5.6 in (1.67 m)	Nagpur	Top 5
4	Archana Ravi	23	5 ft 6 in (1.68 m)	Changanassery	Top 10
5	Arshina Sumbul	21	5 ft 6 in (1.68 m)	Jaipur	Top 10
6	Farhat Firoza	24	5 ft 6 in (1.68 m)	Bilaspur	
7	Lavanya Gunasekar	24	5 ft 6 in (1.68 m)	Salem	
8	Malashya Kashyap	18	5 ft 7 in (1.70 m)	Udalguri	Top 10
9	Megha Sachdeva	22	5 ft 5.25 in (1.66 m)	Moradabad	
10	Neha Jaiswal	23	5 ft 6.5 in (1.69 m)	Pune	Miss Diva Runner-up
11	Nishi Bharadwaj	25	5 ft 6.5 in (1.69 m)	Mahendragarh	
12	Payal Sharma	24	5 ft 5 in (1.65 m)	Nagpur	
13	Rashalika Sabharwal	25	5 ft 6 in (1.68 m)	Patiala	
14	Roshni Sharma	21	5 ft 6 in (1.68 m)	Mumbai	Top 5
15	Rushali Yadav	22	5 ft 9 in (1.75 m)	Ajmer	Top 10
16	Shivangi Sharma	20	5 ft 5.5 in (1.66 m)	Dehradun	
17	Shreya Poonja	19	5 ft 8 in (1.73 m)	New Delhi	
18	Suruthi Periyasamy	25	5 ft 6 in (1.68 m)	Salem	
19	Tanya Subramanian	23	5 ft 7 in (1.70 m)	New Delhi	
20	Vaishnavi Ganesh	18	5 ft 9.6 in (1.77 m)	Bengaluru	Top 10

== Grand finale judges ==
- Anntonia Porsild - Miss Supranational 2019 from Thailand
- Asha Bhat - Miss Supranational 2014 from India
- Anil Kapoor - Bollywood Actor
- Aditya Roy Kapoor - Bollywood Actor
- Lara Dutta - Miss Universe 2000
- Nikhil Mehra - Designer
- Shivan Bhatiya - Fashion Designer
- Narresh Kukreja - Fashion Designer
- Gavin Miguel - Designer

== Selection of participants ==
Twenty delegates would be selected to compete in the grand finale. Among them, thirteen participants were selected from various rounds of city audition. Five finalists were selected through Campus Princess 2019 auditions. The winner of Miss North-East Diva, a regional contest conducted by the Miss India Organization, for aspirants from the Northeast India gets direct entry in the Top 20. This competition was won by Malashya Kashyap.

=== City Finalists ===
Following are the finalists selected in auditions conducted at various cities of India. They would be further shortlisted and finalized as the contestants of Liva Miss Diva 2020 pageant. Few delegates selected by the Miss India Organization competed in the Wildcard round in Mumbai. The winner of this round would be selected with a combination of public voting & internal jury members.

Color key

- Shortlisted as Miss Diva 2020 contestant.
- Advanced to Top 20 by winning the Wildcard public vote.

Lucknow	Hyderabad	Chennai	Kolkata	Indore	Pune	Bengaluru	Jaipur	Chandigarh	Delhi	Mumbai
Anushka Kumar	Aishwarya S	Adline Castelino	Akshita Singh	Aavriti Choudhary	Mehek Vinayak	Anjali Anish	Ankita Trivedi	Devianna Ahluwalia	Akanksha Choudhary	Alankrita Shahi
Ishika Bisht	Bella Lolage	Aishwarya Dinesh	Meghna Bose	Alisha Khan	Naina Sharma	Lavanya Gunasekar	Kanchan Khatana	Jasmine Singh	Arshiya Sharma	Aneesha Rane
Komal Khillare	Bhavna Sirpa	Farhat Firoza	Megna Mukherjee	Anisha Sharma	Natasha Das	Manmeet Kaur	Rubal Shekhawat	Shreya Suri	Devika Mahajan	Archana Ravi
Rashalika Sabharwal	Harshita Sharma	Neha Jha	Rashmi Madhuri	Monika Dwivedi	Nimisha Chavan	Rashmitha R	Rushali Yadav	Shyna	Elix Chaudhary	Naveli Deshmukh
Simran Singh	Madhushree Gupta	Prithivee	×	Ridhima Firke	Niyamat Nilgiriwala	R Vishnupriya	Samridhi Ahlawat	Simran Kapoor	Ilika Tyagi	Payal Sharma
Sukraty Saxena	Sri Lakshmi	Rubeiya SK	×	Senhapriya Roy	Sachi Kudale	Simran Pareek	Simran Sharma	Ushtu Chiber	Lavanya John	Ritika Nayak
×	Sri Sai Reddy	×	×	Tanya Mittal	Sakshi Bhosale	Vaishnavi Ganesh	×	×	Lavanya Sangwan	Roshini Sharma
×	Soundarya Gowda	×	×	Tejal Patil	Tanisha Pal	×	×	×	Ritika Nayak	Shivangi Sharma
×	Taruna Choudhary	×	×	×	Vaibhavi Sharma	×	×	×	Shreya Bahukhandi	Sruthi Periyasamy
×	×	×	×	×	×	×	×	×	Tanya Subramanian	×
