= Ritika Khatnani =

Indian model

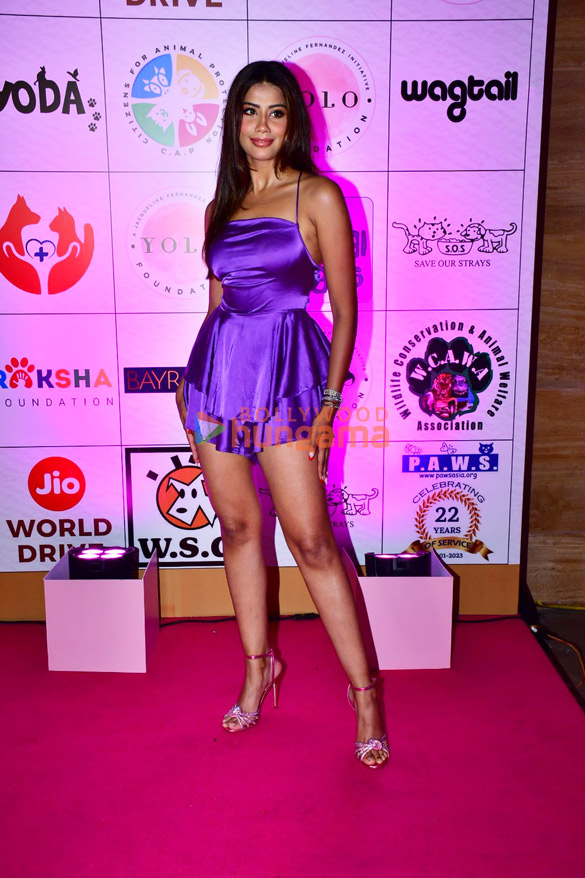
- Khatnani attending the YOLO Foundation Initiative
- Born: 26 April 2002 (age 24); Pune, Maharashtra, India
- Education: Jai Hind College (MMC)
- Height: 1.78 m (5 ft 10 in)
- Beauty pageant titleholder
- Title: Miss Teen Diva 2018; Miss Supranational India 2021; Miss Supranational Asia 2022
- Hair color: Black
- Eye color: Brown
- Major competitions: Miss Teen Diva 2018; (Winner); Miss Teen International 2018; (1st Runner Up); Miss Diva 2021; (Miss Supranational India 2021); Miss Supranational 2022; (Miss Supranational Asia 2022); (Miss Photogenic); (Top 12)

Ritika Khatnani (born 26 April 2002) is an Indian model and pageant titleholder. She won the Miss Supranational India 2021 at Miss Diva 2021 and represented India at Miss Supranational 2022. where she was crowned Miss Supranational Asia 2022.

== Personal life ==
Ritika was born in Pune, Maharashtra, and was raised by her mother. She also has a brother. She has mentioned about being denied admission at a school because she was raised by a single parent. She attended VIBGYOR High School in Pune and later pursued Mass Media and Communication at Jai Hind College, Mumbai

== Pageantry ==
=== Miss Teen Diva 2018 ===
Khatnani began competing in pageants at the age of 16, when she won the Miss Teen Diva 2018 title.

=== Miss Teen International 2018 ===
She went on to represent India at Miss Teen International 2018 where she finished as the runner up.

=== Miss Diva 2021 ===
She later competed at Miss Diva 2021 at the age of 19. She was crowned Miss Diva Supranational 2021 by the outgoing titleholder Aavriti Choudhary.

=== Miss Supranational 2022 ===
Khatnani went on to represent India at Miss Supranational 2022 in Nowy Sącz, Poland. She advanced to the Top 12 finalists. She won the titles of Miss Supranational Asia 2022 and Miss Photogenic.

Awards and achievements
Preceded by (Indonesia) Jihane Almira Chedid	Miss Supranational Asia; 2022	Succeeded by (India) Pragnya Ayyagari
Preceded by Aavriti Choudhary	Miss Diva Supranational; 2021	Succeeded by Pragnya Ayyagari
