= Miss Diva 2018 =

6th edition of Miss Diva

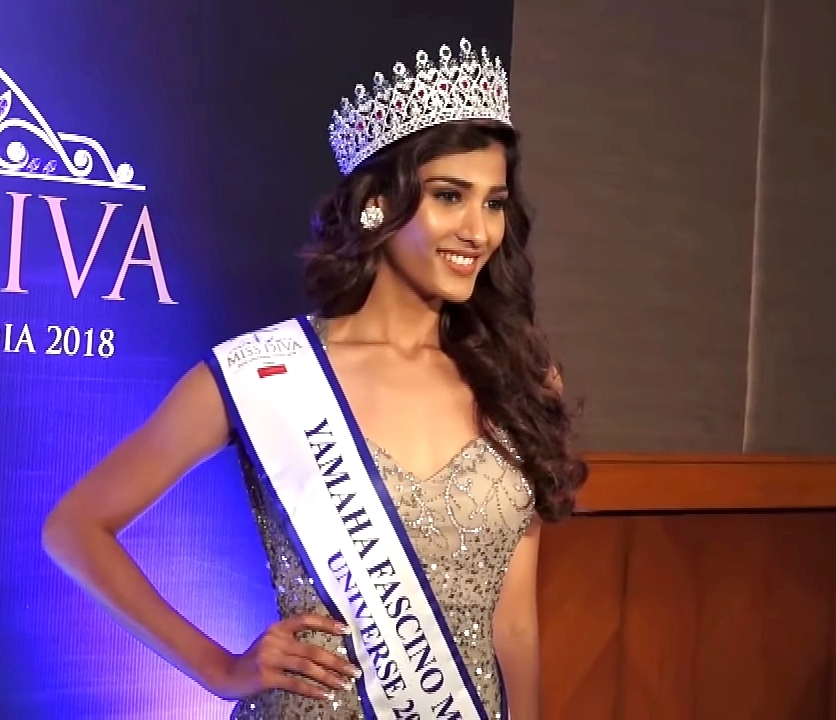
- Nehal Chudasama
- Date: 31 August 2018
- Presenters: Malaika Arora; Sophie Choudhary
- Entertainment: Sonakshi Sinha; Tiger Shroff
- Venue: NSCI, National Sports Club of India, Mumbai
- Broadcaster: Colors Infinity
- Entrants: 19
- Placements: 10
- Winner: • Nehal Chudasama • Aditi Hundia
- Congeniality: Hannah Reji Koshy
- Photogenic: Salony Narang

The 6th edition of Miss Diva took place on 31 August 2018. Top 19 contestants selected from India competed in the pageant, who were mentored by Miss Universe 2000, Lara Dutta. At the end of the event, Miss Universe India 2017, Shraddha Shashidhar crowned Nehal Chudasama as her successor. She represented India at the 67th Miss Universe 2018 pageant held in Bangkok, Thailand on 16 December 2018. At the same event, Aditi Hundia was crowned as Miss Diva - Supranational 2018 and Roshni Sheoran was crowned as Runner-up. Miss Universe 2017, Demi-Leigh Nel-Peters was a member of the jury. Miss Supranational 2017, Jenny Kim also graced the event. This was also the first miss diva pageant in which the finale was telecasted on the same day.

== Final results ==
Color keys

- The contestant Won in an International pageant.
- The contestant was a Runner-up in an International pageant.
- The contestant was a Semi-Finalist in an International pageant.
- Unplaced

Final Results	Candidate	International Placement
Miss Universe India 2018	Nehal Chudasama	Unplaced
Miss Diva Supranational 2018	Aditi Hundia	Top 25
Runner-up	Roshni Sheoran	
Top 5	Hannah Reji Koshy; Lavina Israni	
Top 10	Aditi Shetty; Apurva Chavan; Preethy Prabhakaran; Shefali Sood; Tanvi Malhi	

=== Special awards ===
Award	Winner
Miss Spirit of Goa	Anindita Kakoti
Miss Life Style	Tanvi Malhi
Anything But Ordinary Diva	Nehal Chudasama
Miss Beautiful Body	Nehal Chudasama
Miss Talented	Apurva Chavan & Anindita Kakoti
Miss Beautiful Smile	Preethy Prabhakaran
Miss Spirit of Delhi	Vanshika Rajput
Miss Iron Maiden	Aditi Shetty
Miss Active	Aditi Shetty
Miss Water Baby	Surina Jaidka
Miss Smasher	Aditi Hundia
Miss Hooper	Venus Malik
Miss Top-Spinner	Roshni Sheoran
Miss Fascinating	Shefali Sood
Miss Spirit of Chennai	Elisha Mayor
Miss Style Icon	Aditi Hundia
Miss Photogenic	Salony Narang
Miss Congeniality	Hannah Reji Koshy
Miss Top Model	Roshni Sheoran
Best Makeover	Himanshi Bhadana
Miss Popular	Amanpreet Kaur
Miss Multimedia	Nehal Chudasama

== Judges ==
- Lara Dutta - Miss Universe 2000 & Bollywood Actress
- Demi-Leigh Nel-Peters - Miss Universe 2017 from South Africa
- Neha Dhupia
- Shilpa Shetty
- Sushant Singh Rajput
- Faluguni Peacock - Designer
- Shane Peacock - Designer

== Contestants ==
The following are the contestants participated in the Miss Diva 2018:

Color key

- Declared as Winner
- Ended as Runner-up
- Ended as one of the Finalists or Semi-finalists

Contestant	Age (Note: Ages at the time of the pageant)	Hometown	Placement	Height
Apurva Chavan	21	Pune	Top 10	
Anindita Kakoti	19	Guwahati		
Venus Malik	22	Bangalore		
Aditi Hundia	21	Jaipur	Miss Supranational India	1.68 m (5 ft 6 in)
Aditi Shetty	25	Mumbai	Top 10	
Shefali Sood	23	Lucknow	Top 10	1.73 m (5 ft 8 in)
Elisha Mayor	21	Greater Noida		
Aishwarya Kamal	21	New Delhi		
Amanpreet Kaur	18	Mumbai		
Hannah Reji Koshy	26	Kochi	Top 5	1.65 m (5 ft 5 in)
Himanshi Bhadana	23	Gurgaon		
Lavina Israni	24	Mumbai	Top 5	
Nehal Chudasama	22	Mumbai	Miss Diva Universe 2018	1.68 m (5 ft 6 in)
Preethy Prabhakaran	25	Chennai	Top 10	
Roshni Sheoran	19	Lucknow	Miss Diva Runner-up	
Salony Narang	18	Indore		
Vanshika Rajput	19	New Delhi		
Surina Jaidka	19	New Delhi		
Tanvi Malhi	19	Panchkula	Top 10	

== Crossovers and returnees ==
Miss Diva

- 2021: Aishwarya Kamal
- 2019: Shefali Sood Miss Supranational India
- 2017: Elisha Mayor
- 2023: Apurva Chavan

Femina Miss India

- 2017: Aditi Hundia RAJASTHAN (Top 15)
- 2017: Shefali Sood UTTAR PRADESH (Top 6)
- 2023: Apurva Chavan MAHARASHTRA (Too 7)

Femina Miss India Maharashtra

- 2018: Apurva Chavan (Top 3)

Femina Miss India Kerala

- 2017: Hannah Reji Koshy (Top 3)

Femina Miss India Punjab

- 2018: Surina Jaidka (Top 3)

Femina Miss India Gujarat

- 2018: Nehal Chudasama (Top 3)
