= Miss Diva 2026 =

2026 Indian beauty pageant and talent competition

- Date: 29 November 2026
- Broadcaster: YouTube (live coverage)
- Entrants: 26

Miss Diva 2026 is a scheduled edition of Miss Diva, an Indian beauty pageant and talent competition. Presented by the fashion brand LIVA, the competition is scheduled to conclude with a grand finale on 29 November 2026. The event will include the selection of India's representatives for Miss Supranational and Miss Cosmo, alongside competitions for fashion designers and digital content creators.

The 2026 competition comprises three categories: Beauty Queen, Fashion Designer and Content Creator. The Beauty Queen category will award the Miss Diva Supranational 2026 and Miss Diva Cosmo 2026 titles, while the other categories will select a Miss Diva Fashion Designer 2026 and Miss Diva Content Creator 2026.

The official finalist list includes ten contestants in the Beauty Queen category and eight each in the Fashion Designer and Content Creator categories.

== Background ==
=== Competition format ===
For 2026, Miss Diva is being conducted as a competition across three categories covering beauty pageantry, fashion design and content creation. The organisers described the format as a means of selecting participants for opportunities in pageantry and the fashion and digital media industries.

The Beauty Queen category forms the pageant component of the event. Its two principal titles, Miss Diva Supranational 2026 and Miss Diva Cosmo 2026, are associated with the selection of Indian representatives for Miss Supranational and Miss Cosmo, respectively.

=== Selection process ===
==== Beauty Queen ====
A group of 20 Beauty Queen contestants was announced in October 2026. The selection process subsequently reduced the field to 10 finalists, whose names were published in November 2026.

The selection process included a public-voting wildcard mechanism through which Khushi Bisla qualified for the final 10 contestants.

Kangkana Choudhury, who won the North East Diva 2026 pageant held in Guwahati, Assam, also received direct entry into the national Miss Diva competition.

==== Fashion Designer ====
The Fashion Designer selection process included auditions and screening activities involving educational institutions. One of the screening events was held at the School of Design of D. Y. Patil University, where applicants presented their work to a jury.

During the final auditions in October 2026, shortlisted designers presented work based on the theme "Bedazzle Nights". The assessment considered originality, craftsmanship, fabric interpretation, colour, silhouettes and presentation.

==== Content Creator ====
The Content Creator category included a practical assignment titled "BEAT. FLOW. REPEAT." in October 2026. The contestants were given mystery bags containing materials for a content-production task. Miss Diva Content Creator 2025 Monica D'Souza introduced the assignment to the participants.

=== Grand Finale ===
- Katrina Llegado – Miss Supranational 2026 from the Philippines
- Yolina Lindquist – Miss Cosmo 2025 from the United States

== Special selections and fast-track qualification ==
Miss Diva used several qualification mechanisms during the selection process, including regional competitions and public voting.

Selection	Contestant	Result(s)
North East Diva 2026	Kangkana Choudhury	Direct entry into Miss Diva 2026
LIVA Wildcard	Khushi Bisla	Direct entry into the Beauty Queen Top 10

=== Diva Fan Vote ===
In November 2026, the organisers introduced the Diva Fan Vote for the 10 Beauty Queen finalists. The voting system assigned two points for a like, five for a comment, three for a share and ten for following the competition's official Instagram account. The contestant with the highest validated score was to receive a fast-track entry into the final Top 5 or Top 6. Voting was scheduled to close on 28 November 2026 at 11:59 p.m. IST.

== Contestants ==
=== Beauty Queen ===
Miss Diva Beauty Queen 2026 finalists
Contestant	Age	State/UT
Aiswarya Sreenivasan	27	Kerala
Cameroon Joseph	23	Kerala
Chilakalapudi Indu Phalguni	21	Telangana
Kangkana Choudhury	24	Assam
Khushi Bisla	21	Delhi
Shikha Sushil	20	Karnataka
Shreya Patil	21	Maharashtra
Simran Jain	25	Maharashtra
Sinyora Swami	21	Madhya Pradesh
Soumya Sheth	20	Maharashtra

=== Content Creator ===
Miss Diva Content Creator 2026 finalists
Contestant	Age	State/UT
Anjali Gupta	26	Maharashtra
Diya Bihaani	22	Maharashtra
Kiara Kadam	19	Maharashtra
Kusum Bhatt	25	Telangana
Rimple Rai	29	Madhya Pradesh
Shreeradhe Khanduja	31	Uttar Pradesh
Vaishnavi Marwadi	25	Maharashtra
Vidushi Dusad	21	Rajasthan

=== Fashion Designer ===
Miss Diva Fashion Designer 2026 finalists
Contestant	Age	State/UT
Diksha Mahajan	26	Delhi
Hetwi Dhingani	23	Gujarat
Kago Reela	22	Arunachal Pradesh
Revati Warale	22	Maharashtra
Sneha Mukherjee	23	Assam
Sohana Chandan	21	West Bengal
Uma Kushwah	26	Delhi
Vidhi Suthar	21	Gujarat

== See also ==
- Miss Diva
- Femina Miss India
