= Pragnya Ayyagari =

Indian beauty pageant titleholder

- Born: 10 February 2002 (age 24); Hyderabad, Telangana, India
- Education: International Institute of Fashion Design, Hyderabad
- Occupation: Model
- Height: 5 ft 6 in (1.68 m)
- Beauty pageant titleholder
- Title: Miss India Telangana 2022; Miss Supranational India 2023
- Major competitions: Femina Miss India 2022; (Top 5); Miss Diva Supranational 2022; (Appointed); Miss Supranational 2023; (Top 12); (Miss Supranational Asia)

Pragnya Ayyagari (born 10 February 2002) is an Indian model and beauty pageant titleholder who was appointed and crowned as Miss Supranational India on 28 August 2022 in Mumbai by outgoing Miss Supranational India and Miss Supranational Asia 2022 Ritika Khatnani. Pragnya represented India at Miss Supranational 2023 competition held on 14 July 2023 in Poland and placed among the Top 12 finalists. She also won the title of Miss Supranational Asia, marking it India’s second consecutive year of winning the title.

== Pageantry ==
Pragnya won the Femina Miss India Telangana 2022 title in May and represented Telangana at the Femina Miss India 2022 pageant on 3 June 2022, finishing among the Top 5 finalists. Later, in early August, she was chosen from a pool of contestants to represent India at the Miss Supranational pageant the following year. Pragnya was crowned Miss Diva Supranational 2022 on 28 August 2022, by her predecessor Ritika Khatnani, Miss Diva Supranational 2021 and Miss Supranational Asia 2022.

=== Miss Supranational 2023 ===
Pragnya represented India at the Miss Supranational 2023 pageant, which took place on 14 July 2023 in Poland and placed among the Top 12 finalists making India's third consecutive placement in the Top 12 since 2021.

During the competition, she won the Supra-Chat sub contest among her group and advanced to the Top 10 and later to Top 5 of the contest. Her Indian classical dance in the Talent round earned her a spot in the Top 12 finalists. Pragnya was one of the Top 10 Supra Fan-vote finalists, in which the audience or general public votes for a delegate to move on to the semi-finals.

With Pragnya been among the Top 12 finalists, India has now placed in the competition ten times in a row since 2013, third in the Top 12 and second to win the Miss Supranational Asia continental title.

Awards and achievements
Preceded by Ritika Khatnani	Miss Diva Supranational; 2022	Succeeded by Sonal Kukreja
Preceded by (India) Ritika Khatnani	Miss Supranational Asia; 2023	Succeeded by (Philippines) Alethea Ambrosio
