= Adline Castelino =

Indian beauty pageant titleholder

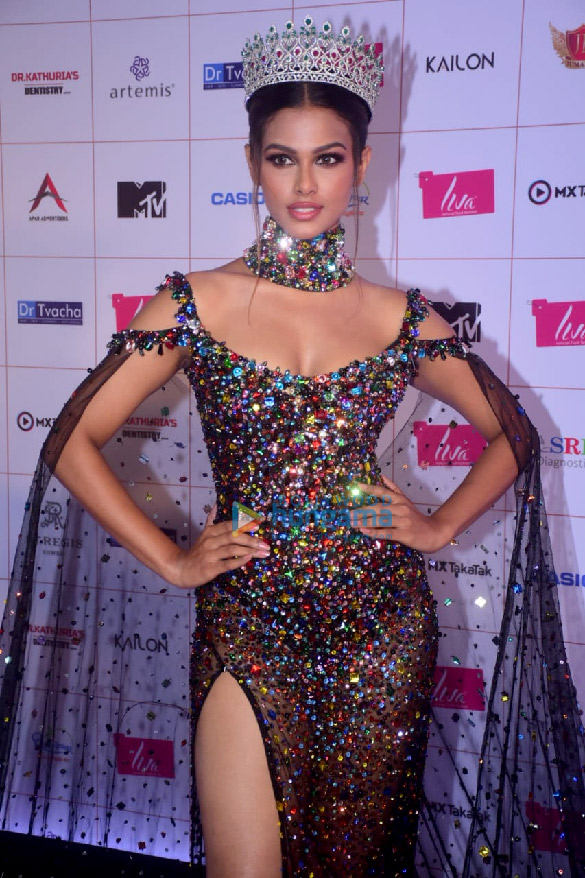
- Castelino in 2021
- Born: Adline Mewis Quadros Castelino; Kuwait City, Kuwait
- Citizenship: India
- Education: Wilson College, Mumbai
- Occupation: Model
- Height: 5 ft 6 in (168 cm)
- Beauty pageant titleholder
- Title: Miss Diva Universe 2020
- Major competitions: Miss Diva 2020 (winner – Miss Diva Universe 2020); Miss Universe 2020 (3rd runner-up)

Adline Mewis Quadros Castelino is an Indian beauty pageant titleholder who was crowned Miss Diva Universe 2020. She represented India at Miss Universe 2020, and was the third runner-up.

== Early life and education ==
Her family is from Udyavara in Udupi, Karnataka. Castelino attended the Indian Central School in Kuwait. At the age of fifteen, she returned to India and moved to Mumbai, where she attended St. Xavier's High School. Castelino later attended Wilson College, where she graduated with a degree in business administration. She is fluent in English and Hindi, besides her mother tongue Konkani.

== Pageantry ==
Castelino had participated in an online pageant in 2018. She continued her training for pageants through the Cocoaberry Training Academy in Mumbai, where in 2019 she was crowned Miss Cocoaberry Diva.

=== Miss Diva 2020 ===
In 2019, Castelino entered Miss Diva 2020, through the Chennai auditions, and was shortlisted as a city finalist. In the final round of selections in Mumbai, she was placed in the top 20. During the contest's sports round held in Bennett University, she won the Miss Smasher award, for her performance in badminton. On 22 February 2020, she was crowned as Miss Diva Universe 2020 by the outgoing titleholder Vartika Singh at Yash Raj Studio, Andheri, Mumbai.

During the competition's final question and answer round, the top 5 contestants were each asked a question by the host, Malaika Arora: "Does religion unite or divide people?" to which Castelino answered:

Religion definitely unites people. It has values that bring people together. People believing in the same things come together and stay in harmony, but what divides us, is us. Humans divide each other. Religion doesn't divide anyone. When I first came here from Kuwait, I really loved the fact that in India, all religions coexist in harmony. We celebrate Diwali, Christmas, Eid all together and what a beautiful scene that is, that we can stay together and respect each other's beliefs. We can progress with each other and forward to the future.

=== Miss Universe 2020 ===
As the winner of Miss Diva 2020, Castelino represented India at the Miss Universe 2020 competition at Seminole Hard Rock Hotel & Casino, Hollywood, Florida, in the United States. During the grand finale event held on 16 May 2021, she initially made it to the Top 21, and subsequently she was selected as one of the top 10 semifinalists. Castelino further placed in the top 5, thus becoming the first Indian woman to reach the top 5 of Miss Universe since the year 2001.

As one of the finalists at the contest, Castelino was asked by one of the judges, Tatyana Orozco - "Should countries lockdown due to COVID-19 despite the strain on their economies or should they open their borders and risk a potential increase in infection rates?" Castelino answered:

Coming from India and witnessing what the country is experiencing right now, I have realised something very important. Nothing is more important than the health of your loved ones, and you have to draw a balance between economy and health. That can be done only when the government works with the people hand in hand, and produce something that will work with the economy.

At the end of the event, Castelino was the third runner up, with Andrea Meza of Mexico winning the title. This was India's highest placement in Miss Universe since Lara Dutta won the title of Miss Universe 2000.

== Philanthropy ==
Castelino works with a welfare organisation called ‘Vikas Sahayog Pratishthan’ (VSP) which functions to provide a sustainable livelihood for farmers, so as to curb farmers' suicides and inequality. She has raised money for the Child Help Foundation (CHF), through a crowd funding platform called Ketto. She has advocated on spreading more awareness about the acceptance of LGBT community. At Christmas the same year, she went as a Secret Santa to distribute gifts and spent time with the children supported by the society. She supported Smile Train's campaign to end the Social stigma associated with COVID-19. She also initiated fundraisers for the Akshaya Patra Foundation, to help provide meals and packed grocery kits to the marginalized and low-income segment of the society.

In August 2020, she associated with a campaign to spread awareness about polyendocrine metabolic ovarian syndrome (PMOS), formerly known as polycystic ovary syndrome (PCOS). She promoted a drive titled 'PCOS Free India' to help women reverse the condition naturally through holistic wellness practices.

== Media ==
Castelino was ranked in The Times Most Desirable Women at number two in 2020.

== Filmography ==
=== Television ===
Year	Title	Role	Notes	Ref.
2020	Miss Diva Universe 2020	Herself	Contestant and Winner	
2020	Miss Universe 2020	Herself	Contestant and 3rd runner-up	
2021	Kingfisher Calendar: The Making	Herself	Documentary series	

=== Music videos ===
Year	Title	Singer(s)	Label	Ref.
2019	Tere Bina	Shreyas Dharmadhikari	CD Baby	
2021	Mere Dil Vich	Arjun Kanungo, Tanzeel Khan	Arjun Kanungo	

Awards and achievements
Preceded by (Colombia) Gabriela Tafur (Thailand) Paweensuda Drouin (Top 5)	Miss Universe 3rd Runner-Up; 2020	Succeeded by (Colombia) Valeria Ayos (Philippines) Beatrice Gomez (Top 5)
Preceded by Vartika Singh	Miss Diva Universe; 2020	Succeeded by Harnaaz Sandhu
