= Shraddha Shashidhar =

Indian beauty pageant winner (born 1996)

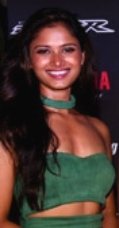
- Born: 3 September 1996 (age 30); Chennai, Tamil Nadu, India
- Education: Bachelor's degree in Mass media
- Alma mater: Sophia College for Women, Mumbai; Army Public School, Deolali, Nashik; St. Xavier's school, Bathinda
- Beauty pageant titleholder
- Title: Miss Diva Universe 2017
- Hair color: Black
- Eye color: Black
- Major competitions: Miss Diva - 2017 (Winner - Miss Diva Universe 2017); Miss Universe 2017 (Unplaced)

Shraddha Shashidhar (born 3 September 1996) is an Indian beauty pageant titleholder who was crowned Miss Diva Universe 2017 and represented India at Miss Universe 2017.

== Early life ==
Shraddha was born in Chennai, India. She did her schooling from Army Public School, Deolali, Nashik and enrolled in Sophia College for Women, Mumbai and has a degree in Mass media.

== Pageantry ==
=== Miss Diva - 2017 ===
Shraddha was crowned Yamaha Fascino Miss Diva Universe 2017 by the outgoing titleholder Yamaha Fascino Miss Diva Universe 2016, Roshmitha Harimurthy.

=== Miss Universe 2017 ===
She represented India at Miss Universe 2017 which was held at The AXIS, Las Vegas, Nevada, United States on 26 November 2017, but was unplaced.

Awards and achievements
Preceded by Roshmitha Harimurthy	Miss Diva Universe; 2017	Succeeded by Nehal Chudasama
