= Miss Universe 2022 =

71st edition of the Miss Universe competition

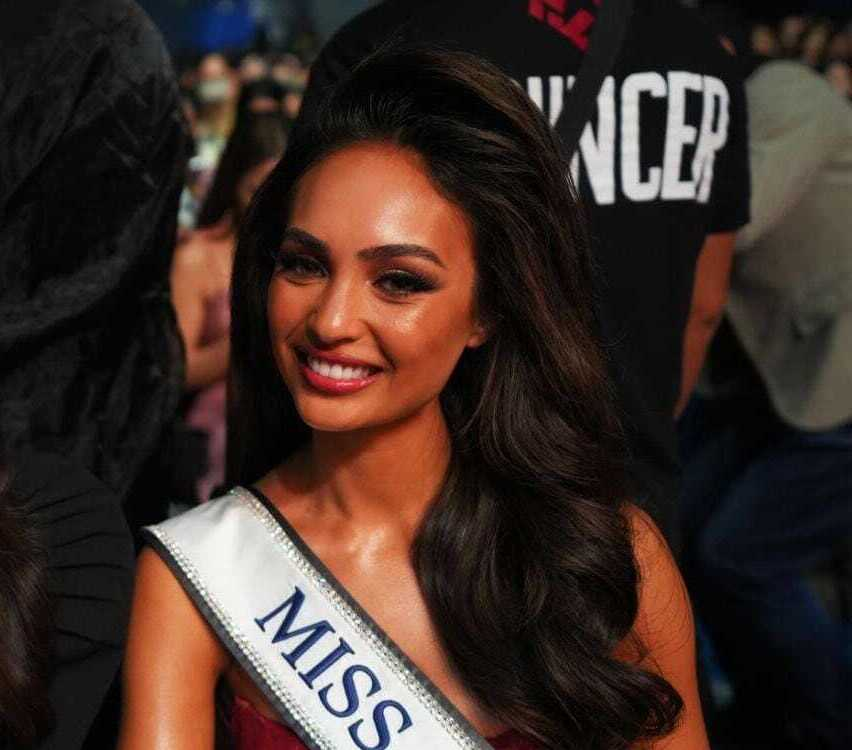
- R'Bonney Gabriel
- Date: 14 January 2023
- Presenters: Jeannie Mai; Olivia Culpo; Catriona Gray; Zuri Hall
- Entertainment: Amanda Shaw; Big Freedia; Big Sam's Funky Nation; Tank and the Bangas; Yolanda Adams
- Venue: New Orleans Morial Convention Center, New Orleans, Louisiana, United States
- Broadcaster: Roku; Telemundo
- Entrants: 83 (Note: Ida Hauan, the reigning Miss Norway, withdrew several hours before the coronation night after testing positive for COVID-19.)
- Placements: 16
- Debuts: Bhutan
- Withdrawals: Denmark; Hungary; Ireland; Israel; Kazakhstan; Kenya; Morocco; Norway; Romania; Sweden
- Returns: Angola; Belize; Indonesia; Kyrgyzstan; Lebanon; Malaysia; Myanmar; Saint Lucia; Seychelles; Switzerland; Trinidad and Tobago; Uruguay
- Winner: R'Bonney Gabriel; United States
- Congeniality: Sofía Depassier, Chile; Maxine Gruppetta, Malta
- Best National Costume: Viktoria Apanasenko, Ukraine

Miss Universe 2022 was the 71st Miss Universe pageant, held at the New Orleans Morial Convention Center in New Orleans, Louisiana, United States on 14 January 2023. This was the first edition held under the ownership of JKN Global Group.

R'Bonney Gabriel of the United States won the competition, succeeding Harnaaz Sandhu of India, marking the ninth victory of the United States in the pageant. Gabriel is the oldest entrant to be win, surpassing Andrea Meza of Mexico in 2020. Her runners-up, in descending order, were Amanda Dudamel of Venezuela and Andreína Martínez of the Dominican Republic.

Contestants from 83 countries and territories competed in this year's pageant. The competition was hosted by Jeannie Mai and Miss Universe 2012, Olivia Culpo; Culpo last served as host during Miss Universe 2020, while Mai last served as backstage correspondent during Miss Universe 2014. Miss Universe 2018, Catriona Gray and Zuri Hall served as backstage correspondents.

The competition was the first event since 1954 not to be televised on any major American television network, but it would air on the streaming provider The Roku Channel as the official broadcaster of the show for the first time. (Note: The exception was the 2020 edition of the pageant, which was broadcast on cable channel FYI when Fox withdrew from the broadcast coverage due to uncertainties caused by the then-ongoing COVID-19 pandemic.)

== Location and date ==
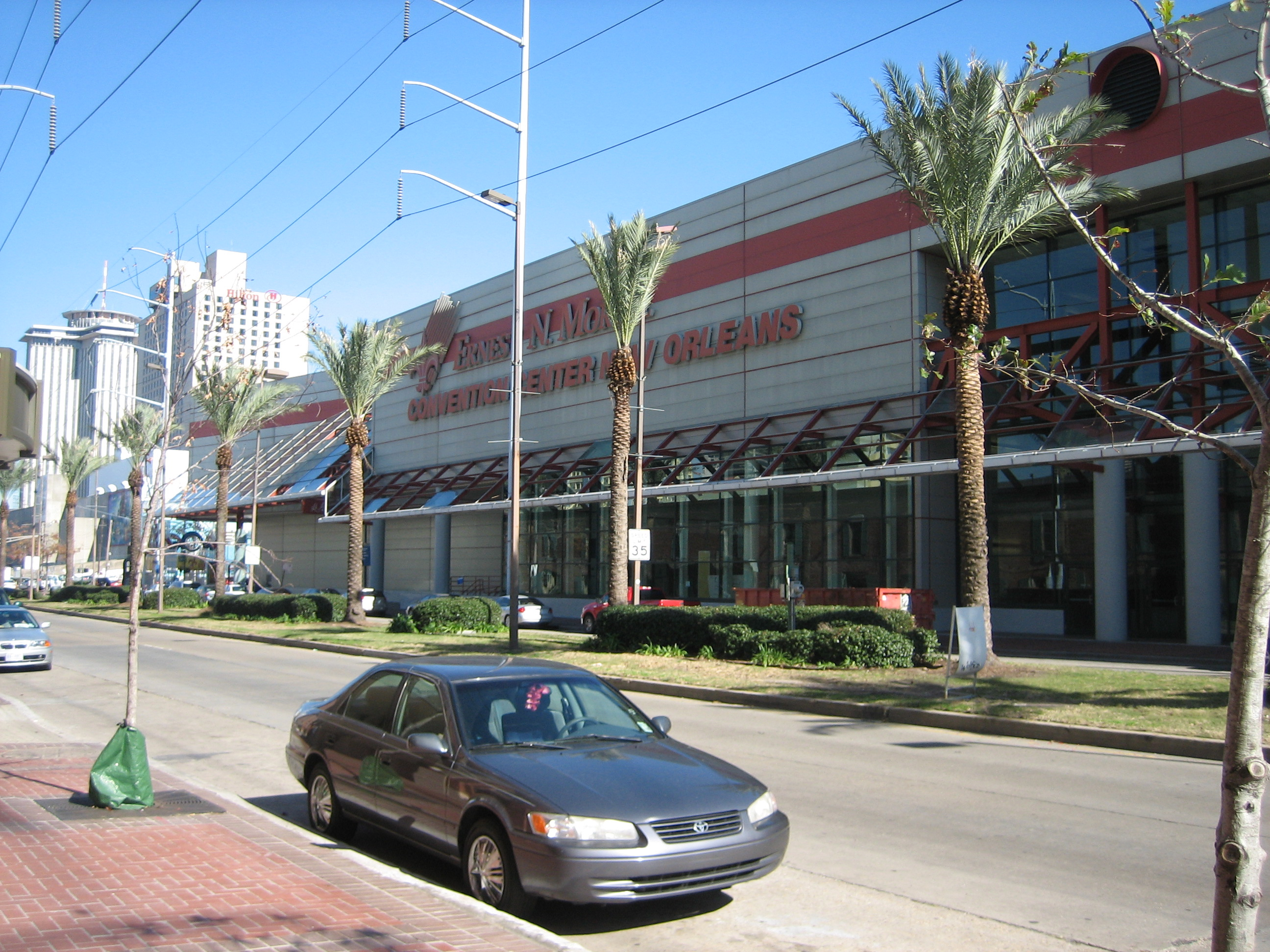
New Orleans Morial Convention Center, the venue of Miss Universe 2022

In September 2022, Puerto Rican newspaper El Vocero reported that an email had been sent to national directors stating that the 2022 edition of Miss Universe would be held in the first quarter of 2023, due to the potential clash of dates with the 2022 FIFA World Cup in November and December 2022. El Vocero also reported that Los Angeles, Miami, and New Orleans in the United States and Nha Trang in Vietnam were seen as potential host cities.

Later in September, Miss Universe Organization president Paula Shugart stated in an interview with ABS-CBN News and Current Affairs that the pageant would be held in January 2023, confirming that the reason for the postponement was to avoid a potential conflict with the 2022 FIFA World Cup. Shugart additionally confirmed that the host city would likely be announced during the following week. On 19 September, the MUO announced that the pageant would be held on 14 January 2023, at the New Orleans Morial Convention Center in New Orleans, Louisiana. This will be the fourth time in the pageant's history that the event is held after the relative calendar year has ended; this previously occurred during the 2014, 2016, and 2020 editions, when they all took place the following year.

== Selection of participants ==
Contestants from eighty-three countries and territories were selected to compete in the competition. Among the delegates, six were appointed to compete as the runner-up in their national pageant, (Note: Monalisa Mouketey of Cameroon was the first runner-up in Miss Cameroon 2023. Divita Rai of India was the second runner-up in Miss Diva 2021. Maxine Gruppetta of Malta was the second runner-up in Miss Universe Malta 2021. Hannah Iribhogbe of Nigeria was the first runner-up in Most Beautiful Girl in Nigeria 2022. Aleyna Şirin of Turkey was the first runner-up in Miss Turkey 2022. Viktoria Apanasenko of Ukraine was the first runner-up in Miss Ukraine Universe 2021.) twelve were chosen through a casting process, (Note: Representatives from Argentina, Armenia, Aruba, the British Virgin Islands, Colombia, the Czech Republic, Guatemala, Mauritius, Portugal, Seychelles, South Korea, and Uruguay, were each selected through a casting process conducted by their respective organizations.) while three were selected to replace an original winner.

Tashi Choden of Bhutan became the second openly lesbian to compete in Miss Universe, after Swe Zin Htet of Myanmar in 2019.

=== Replacements ===
Chloe Powery-Doxey, the first runner-up of Miss Universe Cayman Islands 2022, was appointed to represent the Cayman Islands after the original winner, Tiffany Conolly, was alleged to have committed an assault. Floriane Bascou, the first runner-up of Miss France 2022, was appointed to represent France after the original winner, Diane Leyre, chose not to compete due to the lack of time for preparation, Leyre would eventually compete the following year. Camila Sanabria, the first runner-up of Miss Bolivia 2022, was appointed to represent Bolivia after the original winner, Fernanda Pavisic, was dethroned for mocking other Miss Universe candidates' headshots on her Instagram stories.

=== Debuts, returns, and withdrawals ===
This edition marked the debut of Bhutan, and the returns of Angola, Belize, Indonesia, Kyrgyzstan, Lebanon, Malaysia, Myanmar, Saint Lucia, Seychelles, Switzerland, Trinidad and Tobago, and Uruguay. Seychelles previously competed in 1995, making this edition its first time competing after an absence of twenty-seven years. Trinidad and Tobago last competed in 2017, Kyrgyzstan, Lebanon, and Switzerland in 2018, Angola and Saint Lucia in 2019, while the others last competed in 2020. Denmark, Hungary, Ireland, Israel, Kenya, Morocco, Romania, and Sweden withdrew after their respective organizations failed to hold a national competition or appoint a delegate. Diana Tashimbetova was originally to represent Kazakhstan, but was dethroned and not replaced by the Kazakhstani license holder after a series of disputes between Tashimbetova and the license holder regarding the lack of support Tashimbetova received by them for her participation at Miss Universe. Balsam Hussein had been announced as the representative of Iraq in Miss Universe, but due to franchise matter, she decided to withdraw from the competition. Latvia was expected to compete for the first time since 2006, but their chosen delegate Kate Alexeeva withdrew from the competition after testing positive for COVID-19 prior to her departure. Ida Anette Hauan represented Norway, and participated of all pageant phases, but withdrew from the competition a few hours before the final telecast after testing positive for COVID-19.

== Results ==
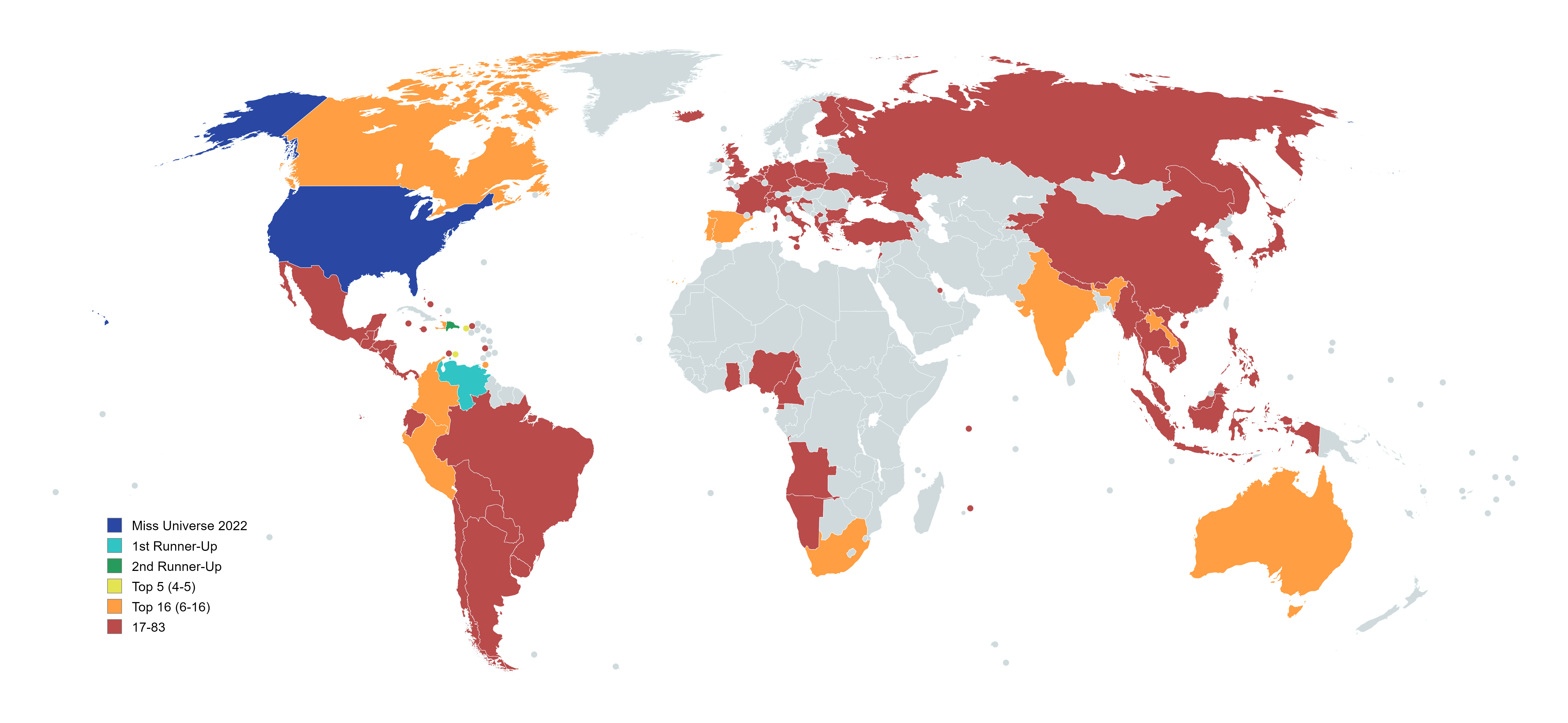
Final results of Miss Universe 2022

=== Placements ===
Placement	Contestant
Miss Universe 2022	United States – R'Bonney Gabriel
1st Runner-Up	Venezuela – Amanda Dudamel
2nd Runner-Up	Dominican Republic – Andreína Martínez
Top 5	Curaçao – Gabriëla dos Santos; Puerto Rico – Ashley Cariño
Top 16	Australia – Monique Riley; Canada – Amelia Tu; Colombia – María Fernanda Aristizábal; Haiti – Mideline Phelizor; India – Divita Rai; Laos – Payengxa Lor §; Peru – Alessia Rovegno; Portugal – Telma Madeira; South Africa – Ndavi Nokeri; Spain – Alicia Faubel; Trinidad and Tobago – Tya Jané Ramey

§ – Voted into the Top 16 by viewers

=== Special awards ===
==== Major Awards ====
Award	Contestant
Best National Costume	Ukraine – Viktoria Apanasenko
Fan Vote Winner	Laos - Payengxa Lor
Miss Congeniality	Chile – Sofía Depassier; Malta – Maxine Gruppetta

==== Minor/sponsor Awards ====
Award	Contestant
Spirit Carnival Awards by Carnival Cruise Line	Ukraine – Viktoria Apanasenko
Social Impact Award by Invisi Smart	Thailand – Anna Sueangam-iam
Swimsuit Cape Vote	Vietnam – Ngọc Châu Nguyễn

== Pageant ==
=== Format ===
The Miss Universe Organization introduced several specific changes to the format for this edition. Initially, it was speculated that the semifinalists would return to twenty, similar to the number of semifinalists between 2018 and 2019. However, due to the limited telecast time of final event, the number of semifinalists was retained to sixteen — the same number of semifinalists in 2021. The results of the preliminary competition — which consisted of the swimsuit competition, the evening gown competition, and the closed-door interview determined the first fifteen semifinalists who advanced at the first cut. The internet voting was also used, with fans being able to vote for another delegate to advance into the semifinals. The sixteen semifinalists competed in both the swimsuit and evening gown competitions and were to be narrowed down to five afterwards. The five finalists competed in the question and answer round, and the final three were chosen. The final speech portion returned, after which Miss Universe 2022 and her two runners-up were announced.

=== Selection committee ===
- Ximena Navarrete – Miss Universe 2010 from Mexico
- Big Freedia – American rapper and performer credited with helping popularize bounce music
- Mara Martin – American model and co-founder of Vyral Media PR
- Wendy Fitzwilliam – Miss Universe 1998 from Trinidad and Tobago
- Emily Austin – American actress, sports journalist, model and social media influencer
- Olivia Quido – Filipino and Chinese CEO and founder of O Skin Med Spa
- Myrka Dellanos – American television and radio host, journalist, author and socialite
- Sweta Patel – Indian vice president of Growth Marketing & Merchandising at Roku
- Olivia Jordan – Miss USA 2015 from Oklahoma (only as preliminary judge)
- Kathleen Ventrella – Puerto Rican chief marketing officer of ImpactWayv (only as preliminary judge)

== Contestants ==
Eighty-three contestants competed for the title.

Country/Territory	Contestant	Age (Note: Ages at the time of the pageant)	Hometown
Albania	Deta Kokomani	22	Durrës
Angola	Swelia António	25	Luanda
Argentina	Bárbara Cabrera	26	Buenos Aires
Armenia	Kristina Ayanian	25	Yerevan
Aruba	Kiara Arends	24	Oranjestad
Australia	Monique Riley	27	Sydney
(The Bahamas) Bahamas	Angel Cartwright	28	Long Island
Bahrain	Evlin Khalifa	24	Riffa
Belgium	Chayenne van Aarle	23	Antwerp
Belize	Ashley Lightburn	26	Belize City
Bhutan	Tashi Choden	24	Wangdue Phodrang
Bolivia	Camila Sanabria	28	Santa Cruz
Brazil	Mia Mamede	27	Vitória
British Virgin Islands	Lia Claxton	19	Tortola
Bulgaria	Kristina Plamenova	26	Byala Slatina
Cambodia	Manita Hang	24	Phnom Penh
Cameroon	Monalisa Mouketey	26	Buea
Canada	Amelia Tu	21	Vancouver
Cayman Islands	Chloe Powery-Doxey	25	George Town
Chile	Sofía Depassier	24	Santiago
China	Sichen Jiang	26	Shanghai
Colombia	María Fernanda Aristizábal	25	Armenia
Costa Rica	María Fernanda Rodríguez	25	Quesada
Croatia	Arijana Podgajski	20	Krapina
Curaçao	Gabriëla dos Santos	20	Willemstad
Czech Republic	Sára Mikulenková	20	Valašské Mezirící
Dominican Republic	Andreína Martínez	25	Santiago
Ecuador	Nayelhi González	26	Esmeraldas
El Salvador	Alejandra Guajardo	26	Cabañas
Equatorial Guinea	Alba Isabel Obama	21	Mbini
Finland	Petra Hämäläinen	26	Savonlinna
France	Floriane Bascou	20	Le Lamentin
Germany	Soraya Kohlmann	24	Leipzig
Ghana	Engracia Mofuman	27	Kumasi
(United Kingdom) Great Britain	Noky Simbani	26	Derby
Greece	Korina Emmanouilidou	22	Kozani
Guatemala	Ivana Batchelor	22	Quetzaltenango
Haiti	Mideline Phelizor	27	Port-au-Prince
Honduras	Rebeca Rodríguez	20	San Pedro Sula
Iceland	Hrafnhildur Haraldsdóttir	18	Reykjavík
India	Divita Rai	25	Mangaluru
Indonesia	Laksmi De-Neefe Suardana	26	Ubud
Italy	Virginia Stablum	24	Trento
Jamaica	Toshami Calvin	26	Saint Thomas
Japan	Marybelen Sakamoto	24	Chiba
Kosovo	Roksana Ibrahimi	24	Pristina
Kyrgyzstan	Altynai Botoyarova	18	Bishkek
Laos	Payengxa Lor	21	Vientiane
Lebanon	Yasmina Zaytoun	20	Kfarchouba
Malaysia	Lesley Cheam	27	Semenyih
Malta	Maxine Gruppetta	22	St. Julian's
Mauritius	Alexandrine Belle-Étoile	26	Curepipe
Mexico	Irma Miranda	26	Ciudad Obregón
Myanmar	Zar Li Moe	21	Bhamo
Namibia	Cassia Sharpley	23	Windhoek
Nepal	Sophiya Bhujel	27	Kathmandu
Netherlands	Ona Moody	25	Amsterdam
Nicaragua	Norma Huembes	24	San Marcos
Nigeria	Hannah Iribhogbe	21	Edo
Panama	Solaris Barba	23	Chitré
Paraguay	Lia Ashmore	27	Villarrica
Peru	Alessia Rovegno	24	Lima
Philippines	Celeste Cortesi	25	Pasay
Poland	Aleksandra Klepaczka	23	Łódź
Portugal	Telma Madeira	23	Póvoa de Varzim
Puerto Rico	Ashley Cariño	28	Fajardo
Russia	Anna Linnikova	22	Orenburg
Saint Lucia	Sheris Paul	27	Castries
Seychelles	Gabriella Gonthier	24	Mahé
Singapore	Carissa Yap	22	Singapore
Slovakia	Karolína Michalčíková	24	Trenčín
South Africa	Ndavi Nokeri	23	Tzaneen
South Korea	Hanna Kim	28	Seoul
Spain	Alicia Faubel	26	Alicante
Switzerland	Alia Guindi	19	Valais
Thailand	Anna Sueangam-iam	24	Bangkok
Trinidad and Tobago	Tya Jané Ramey	25	Arouca
Turkey (Note: The country has competed as Türkiye in the pageant since 2022, following the United Nations' official recognition of the name change in June 2022)	Aleyna Şirin	21	Istanbul
Ukraine	Viktoria Apanasenko	28	Kyiv
United States	R'Bonney Gabriel	28	Houston
Uruguay	Carla Romero	25	Montevideo
Venezuela	Amanda Dudamel	23	Mérida
Vietnam	Ngọc Châu Nguyễn	28	Tây Ninh
