= Nehal Chudasama =

Indian model

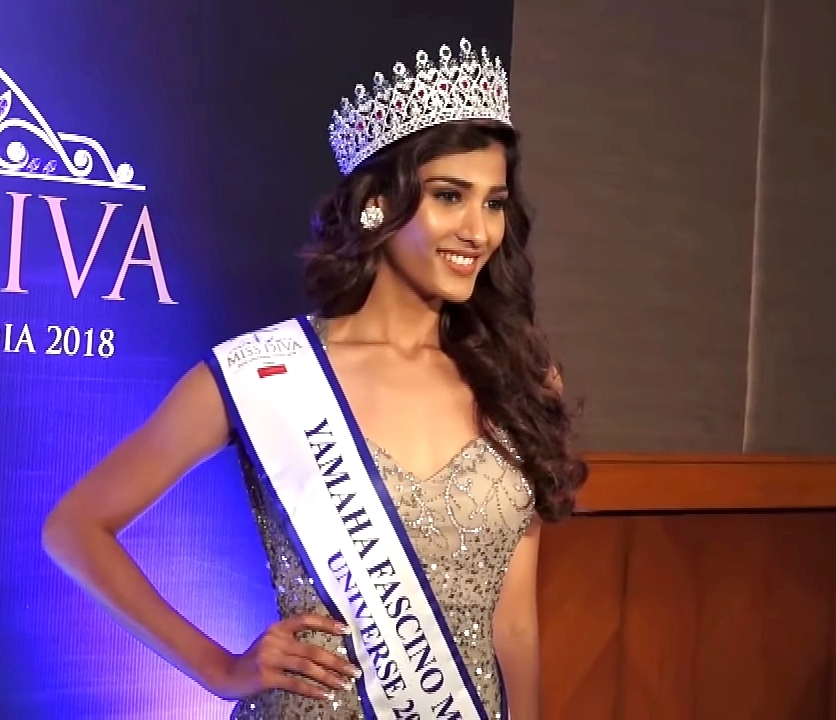
- Chudasama in 2018
- Born: Nehal Chudasama; Mumbai, Maharashtra, India
- Education: St. Rocks School,
- Occupations: Model; TV Host; Actress
- Beauty pageant titleholder
- Title: Miss Universe India 2018
- Hair color: Black
- Eye color: Brown
- Major competitions: Miss Diva - 2018 (Winner - Miss Diva Universe 2018); Miss Universe 2018 (Unplaced)

Nehal Chudasama is an Indian model, actress and beauty pageant titleholder. She was crowned Miss Diva Universe 2018 and represented India at Miss Universe 2018. In 2025, she participated in Bigg Boss 19.

== Early life ==
Nehal Chudasama was born and raised in Mumbai, India. Her father was a flower seller of Gujarati origin. Chudasama was bullied for her darker skin tone, being overweight, and was subject to body shaming. She suffered from depression during her teenage years. She also reported that she was stalked, mentally harassed, and attacked in public.

== Filmography ==
=== Television ===
Year	Title	Role	Notes
2019	The Holiday	Rhea	
2022	Tu Zakhm Hai	Shanaya Suri	
2024	Badi Heroine Banti Hai	Anastasia	
2025	Bigg Boss 19	Contestant	14th Place
2026	The 50	Contestant	Semi Finalist

== Pageantry ==
In 2018, she auditioned for the title Femina Miss Gujarat, where she was one of the top 3 finalists. Later, the same year, she participated in Miss Diva - 2018 contest and won the title of Miss Diva Universe 2018. Nehal represented India at the Miss Universe 2018 pageant held on 17 December 2018 in Bangkok, Thailand, but failed to make it to the top 20.

Awards and achievements
Preceded by Shraddha Shashidhar	Miss Diva Universe; 2018	Succeeded by Vartika Singh
