= Aavriti Choudhary =

Indian beauty pageant titleholder

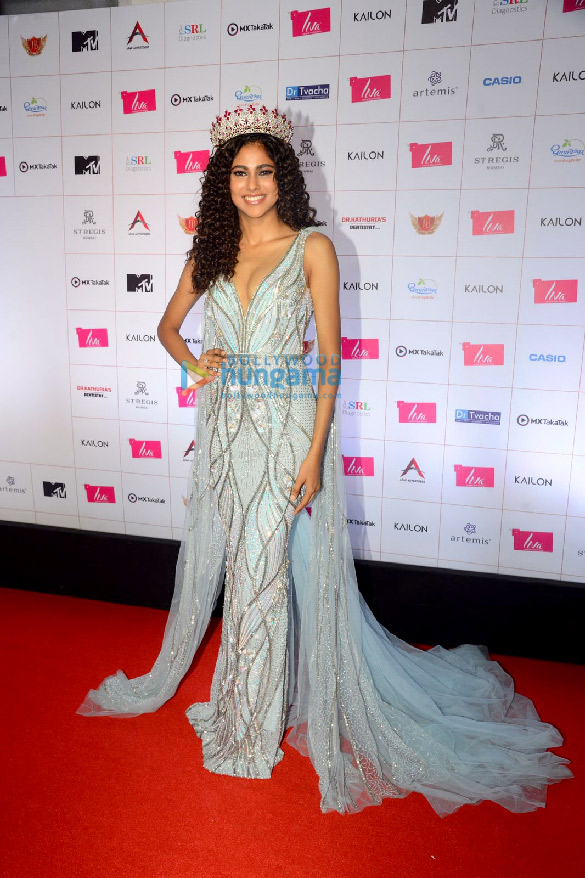
- Choudhary in 2021
- Born: Jabalpur, Madhya Pradesh, India
- Beauty pageant titleholder
- Title: Miss Supranational India 2020
- Major competitions: Miss Diva 2020; (Winner); Miss Supranational 2021; (Top 12)

Aavriti Choudhary is a beauty pageant titleholder who won Miss Diva Supranational India 2020. She represented India at Miss Supranational 2021 on 20 August 2021 at Malopolska in Poland where she reached the top 12.

== Early life and education ==
Choudhary attended secondary school at St. Joseph's Convent Girls' Senior Secondary School.

== Pageantry ==
=== Miss Diva 2020 ===
In 2019, Choudhary auditioned and shortlisted in Indore for the Miss Diva 2020 contest. In the final round of selections in Mumbai, she was finalised as a top 20 contestant. On 22 February 2020, she was eventually crowned as Miss Diva Supranational 2020 by the outgoing titleholder Shefali Sood and sashed by Miss Supranational 2019, Anntonia Porsild at Yash Raj Studio, Andheri, Mumbai.

=== Miss Supranational 2021 ===
As Miss Diva Supranational 2020, Choudhary represented India at the Miss Supranational 2021 competition held at Malopolska in Poland, finishing at tenth.

== Media ==
In 2020, Choudhary was ranked in The Times of India Desirable Women at number ten.

Awards and achievements
Preceded by Shefali Sood	Miss Diva Supranational; 2020	Succeeded by Ritika Khatnani
