= Divita Rai =

Indian beauty pageant titleholder

- Beauty pageant titleholder
- Title: Miss Diva 2022
- Major competitions: Miss Diva 2021; (2nd Runner-Up); Miss Universe 2022; (Top 16)

Divita Rai (Tulu: ದಿವಿತ ರೈ); is an Indian beauty pageant titleholder who was crowned Miss Diva 2022 in Mumbai and represented India at Miss Universe 2022 in New Orleans, reaching the top 16.

== Pageantry ==
In 2021, Rai competed at Miss Diva 2021 where she finished as second runner-up, to Harnaaz Sandhu. She also won Miss IQ, Lifestyle, and Sudoku during the pageant. Rai was crowned Miss Diva 2022 on 28 August 2022 by the outgoing titleholder, Harnaaz Sandhu at the Miss Diva Organization's 10th anniversary gala. More than 30 former beauty pageant winners who represented India internationally attended the occasion.

=== Miss Universe 2022 ===
Rai represented India at the Miss Universe 2022 pageant, and reached the top 16.

== Advocacy ==
Rai has spoken about countering the health challenge posed by polyendocrine metabolic ovarian syndrome (PMOS) (formerly known as polycystic ovary syndrome (PCOS)) and how common a condition it is. "I am someone who suffers from PCOS... One out of 5 women face the condition, and it has been definitely a challenge to navigate that. I have to exercise and have a healthy diet, to curb my PCOS from aggravating."

Awards and achievements
Preceded by Harnaaz Sandhu	Miss Diva Universe; 2022	Succeeded by Shweta Sharda
