= Vartika Singh =

Indian model, beauty pageant titleholder

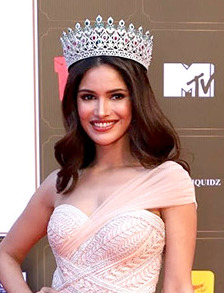
- Singh in 2020
- Born: Vartika Brij Nath Singh; 27 August 1993 (age 33); Lucknow, Uttar Pradesh, India
- Education: Isabella Thoburn College, University of Lucknow Lucknow, India
- Occupations: Model; beauty pageant titleholder; Miss Diva 2019 (Winner – Miss Universe India 2019); Miss Universe 2019 (Top 20)
- Height: 1.71 m (5 ft 7 1/2 in)

Vartika Brij Nath Singh (born 27 August 1993) is an Indian model and beauty pageant titleholder who was appointed as Miss Universe India 2019 and represented India at the 68th edition of the Miss Universe pageant. She was previously crowned as Femina Miss India Femina Miss India Grand International in 2015. GQ magazine ranked her among the hottest women of India in 2017.

== Early life and education ==
Singh was educated at the Canossa Convent School in Lucknow. She received her bachelor's degree in Clinical nutrition and dietetics from Isabella Thoburn College. She holds a master's degree in Public health from the University of Lucknow.

== Pageantry ==
In 2016, her interview and the photoshoot was published in the January edition of the GQ (India) magazine. The magazine also ranked her among the hottest women of India in 2016. She competed in the Kingfisher Model Hunt contest in 2017 and was featured on the Kingfisher bikini calendar's March and October pages.

In 2018, Singh founded a non-profit organization called 'Pure Humans'. As a Public health professional, she aims to create and spread awareness about Public health-related issues in the country. Vartika has been working with the Government of Uttar Pradesh to create awareness and educate the communities about Tuberculosis. She has also been working with the Smile Train Organization in India as a Goodwill Ambassador, to provide aid and treatment to children born with cleft lip and cleft palate.

On 26 September 2019, Vartika was appointed as Miss Universe India 2019, since there was no Miss Diva pageant conducted in 2019. She represented India at the Miss Universe 2019 pageant held in Atlanta, Georgia on 8 December 2019, and placed in the Top 20. She ended India's consecutive unplacement streak at Miss Universe.

== Filmography ==
=== Films ===
| Year | Title | Role | Notes | Ref. |
|---|---|---|---|---|
| 2025 | Haq | Saira Jahan | Debut film | |

=== Music videos ===
| Year | Song title | Singer | Record label | Ref. |
|---|---|---|---|---|
| 2017 | Saware | Anupam Raag & Rahat Fateh Ali Khan | Times Music | |
| 2019 | Kishmish | Ash King, Momina Mustehsan & Qaran | Times Music | |
| 2026 | Mere Humnava | Jubin Nautiyal | T-Series | |

Awards and achievements
| Preceded by Nehal Chudasama | Miss Universe India; 2019 | Succeeded by Adline Castelino |
| Preceded by Monica Sharma | Miss Grand India; 2015 | Succeeded by Pankhuri Gidwwani |
| Preceded by (Japan) Mieko Takeuchi | Best in Social Media; 2015 | Succeeded by (Jamaica) Dianne Brown |
