= Harnaaz Sandhu =

Indian model (born 2000)

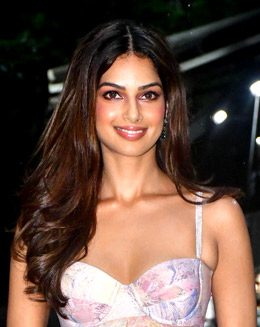
- Sandhu in 2025
- Born: Harnaaz Kaur Sandhu; 3 March 2000 (age 26); Gurdaspur, Punjab, India
- Height: 1.75 m (5 ft 9 in)
- Beauty pageant titleholder
- Title: Femina Miss India Punjab 2019; Miss Universe India 2021; Miss Universe 2021

Harnaaz Kaur Sandhu (born 3 March 2000) is an Indian model, actress, and beauty pageant titleholder best known for winning the title of Miss Universe 2021. The third entrant from India to win Miss Universe, Sandhu was previously crowned Femina Miss India Punjab in 2019, and was a semifinalist at Femina Miss India 2019 pageant. Sandhu has since worked as an actress.

== Early life ==
Harnaaz Kaur Sandhu was born in a Jat Sikh family of the Kohali village in Gurdaspur district, Punjab, to Pritampal Singh Sandhu and Rabinder Kaur Sandhu. Her father is a realtor and her mother a gynaecologist. She also has one sibling.

In 2006, she moved to England, before returning to India two years later and settling in Chandigarh.

She attended Shivalik Public School and the Post Graduate Government College for Girls, both in Chandigarh. Prior to becoming Miss Universe, Sandhu was pursuing a master's degree in public administration.

== Pageantry ==
In 2017, Sandhu won Miss Chandigarh 2017, a regional contest. Subsequently, she participated in the Times Fresh Face Contest 2017, where she was adjudged as the 1st runner-up. She later won the title - Miss Max Emerging Star India 2018.

She auditioned for the regional Femina Miss Punjab 2019 contest, and emerged as the winner. This gave her the right to participate in Femina Miss India 2019.

=== Femina Miss India 2019 ===
Sandhu represented the state of Punjab at Femina Miss India 2019, reaching the top 12. During the finale, she was asked a question by one of the judges - "If you were to be featured in a popular magazine cover, which cover would it be and why?" to which Sandhu replied that she would wish to be featured in the Femina magazine. At the end of the event, Suman Rao of Rajasthan, won Femina Miss India World.

=== Miss Diva 2021 ===
During the preliminary competition held on 22 September, Sandhu won the Miss Beautiful Skin award and became a finalist for Miss Beach Body, Miss Beautiful Smile, Miss Photogenic, and Miss Talented.

She was one of the top 10 semifinalists at the main contest. During the opening statement round, she said:

From a young girl with fragile mental health who faced bullying and body shaming to a woman who emerged like a phoenix, realizing her true potential. From an individual who once doubted her own existence to a woman who is aspiring to inspire the youth. Today, I stand proudly in front of the Universe as a courageous, vivacious, and compassionate woman who is all set to lead a life with a purpose, and to leave behind a remarkable legacy.

During the final question and answer round, as one of the top 5 contestants, she had selected "Global Warming and Climate Change", to which she said:

One day, life will flash before your eyes, make sure it's worth watching. However, this is not the life you want to watch, where the climate is changing and the environment is dying. It is one of the fiasco[s] that we humans have done to the environment. I do believe that we still have time to undo our irresponsible behavior. Earth is all we have in common and our small acts as individuals when multiplied by billions can transform the whole world. Start now, from tonight, switch off those extra lights when not in use. Thank you.

At the end of the event, Sandhu was crowned as the winner by the outgoing titleholder Adline Castelino, and went on to represent India at the Miss Universe 2021.

=== Miss Universe 2021 ===
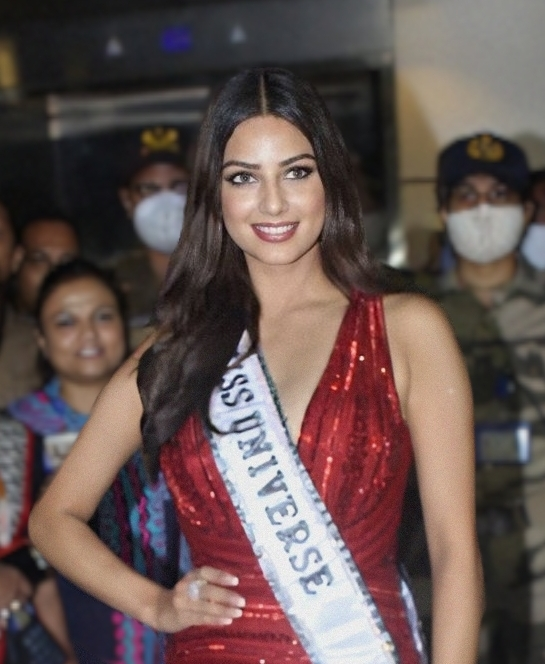
Sandhu at Indira Gandhi International Airport in New Delhi after returning to India as Miss Universe 2021

Sandhu represented India and won Miss Universe 2021 on 13 December 2021 in Eilat, Israel. In the national costume round, Sandhu wore a pink royal lehenga with matching pink umbrella adorned with mirrors.

During the top 5 question and answer round, Sandhu picked Rena Sofer, who asked her "many people think climate change is a hoax, what would you do to convince them to take it seriously?" She answered:

Honestly, my heart breaks to see how nature is going through a lot of problems and it is all due to our irresponsible behavior and I totally feel that this is the time to take actions and talk less because our each action could either kill or save nature. Prevent and protect is better than repent and repair, this is what I am trying to convince you guys today. Thank you.

Advancing to the top 3, in the final question and answer portion, host Steve Harvey asked: "What advice would you give to young women watching on how to deal with the pressures they face today?" Sandhu replied:

Well I think the biggest pressure the youth of today is facing is to believe in themselves. To know that you are unique and that is what makes you beautiful, stop comparing yourselves with others and let's talk about more important things that's happening worldwide. I think this is what you need to understand, come out, speak for yourself because you are the leader of your life, you are the voice of your own. I believed in myself and that's why I am standing here today. Thank you.

Sandhu was announced Miss Universe 2021 by host Steve Harvey and crowned by the outgoing titleholder Andrea Meza of Mexico.

As Miss Universe, Sandhu traveled to Israel, various cities within the United States, the Philippines, Indonesia, Vietnam, South Africa, Colombia, Thailand, and her home country of India.

On 14 January 2023, Sandhu crowned R'Bonney Gabriel of the United States as her successor at Miss Universe 2022 at the New Orleans Morial Convention Center, New Orleans, Louisiana, United States.

== Filmography ==
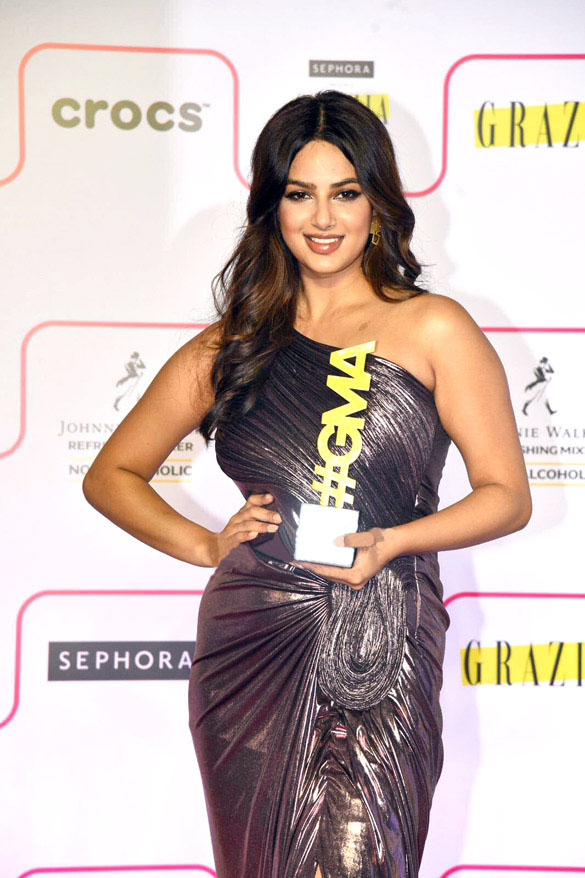
Sandhu at Grazia Millennial Awards 2022

=== Films ===
Year	Title	Role	Language	Ref.
2021	Yaara Diyan Poon Baran	Unknown	Punjabi	
2022	Bai Ji Kuttan Ge	Harleen	Punjabi	
2025	Baaghi 4	Alisha/Avantika	Hindi	Dual role

=== Television ===
Year	Title	Role	Notes	Ref.
2019	Miss India 2019	Herself/Contestant		
2021	Udaariyaan	Manika Suri	Cameo appearance	
2021	Miss Diva Universe 2021	Herself/Contestant/Winner	National pageant	
2021	Miss Universe 2021	Herself/Contestant/Winner	International pageant	
2021	Good Morning America	Herself	Guest appearance	
2022	India's Got Talent	Herself	Guest appearance	
2022	Miss Universe Vietnam 2022	Herself	Judge	
2024	Miss Cosmo 2024	Herself	Judge	

=== Music video appearances ===
Year	Title	Singer(s)	Label	Ref.
2019	"Tarhthalli"	The Landers	Sony Music India	

== Awards ==
Year	Association	Category	Result	Ref.
2022	Grazia India	Global Millennial of the Year	Won	

Awards and achievements
Preceded by (Mexico) Andrea Meza	Miss Universe; 2021	Succeeded by (United States) R'Bonney Gabriel
Preceded by Adline Castelino	Miss Diva Universe; 2021	Succeeded by Divita Rai
Preceded by Anna Kler	Femina Miss India Punjab; 2019	Succeeded by Karuna Singh
