= Miss České republiky =

Beauty contest

Miss České republiky Miss Československo Miss Czechoslovakia
- Formation: 1966 (as Dívka Roku Československa/Girl of the Year of Czechoslovakia); 1989 (as Miss Československo/Miss Czechoslovakia); 1993 (as Miss České a Slovenské republiky/Miss Czech and Slovak Republic); 1994 (as Miss České republiky/Miss Czech Republic); 2018 (as Miss České republiky)
- Type: Beauty pageant
- Headquarters: Prague
- Location: Czech Republic
- Members: Miss Globe; Miss Europe; Miss Aura International; Miss Planet
- Director(s): Robert Novotný & Alexandra Belingerová
- Website: Miss České republiky

Miss České republiky, originally named Miss Československo (English: Miss Czechoslovakia), is the most prestigious national beauty pageant in the Czech Republic.

== History ==
=== Early winners ===
==== The First Czech Queen: 1910 ====
The Czech Republic had its first beauty queen in 1910. However, according to press reports, it was not a domestic competition in the modern sense of the word, but an unofficial competition organized by Czech Parisians. Twenty-year-old Růžena Brožová, selected based on photographs, took part in a trip to Paris in 1910, where beauty queen elections were held during the Mi-carême (mid-Lent) festivities. The press called her the "Czech Queen".

=== Post World War II contests ===
==== 1966 – 1970 ====
The Second World War and the subsequent rise of communism caused a long interruption of the contest. Only around the time of the Prague Spring did beauty pageants temporarily resume from 1966 to 1970. The winners even competed internationally. The last contest was held in June 1970 with the winner of that year's contest being slated to represent Czechoslovakia in the 1971 editions of Miss Universe and Miss Europe, and the 1st Runner-Up representing the country at Miss World 1970. However, after Miss Universe 1970, the 1969 winner who competed at Miss Universe as Miss Czechoslovakia, Kristina Hanzalová, fled to West Germany and requested political asylum in July 1970. In response, the communist government of Czechoslovakia, under direct influence of the Soviet Union, banned beauty pageants in the country and forbade the 1970 winner and runners-up from participating internationally. The ban remained in place until 1989. During this time, the contest was called Dívka Roku/Dívka Roku Československa (English: Girl of the Year/Girl of the Year of Czechoslovakia).

=== Modern day Contest, before the national pageant merger ===
==== 1989 – 1992 ====
The modern day pageant was founded in 1989, under the name Miss Československá Socialistická Republika (Miss ČSSR) (English: Miss Czechoslovak Socialist Republic (Miss CSSR)). The first modern-day Miss Czechoslovkia was Ivana Christová of the East Slovak Region (from the part of the region that is now present-day Prešov). The following year, in 1990, the contest was renamed Miss Česká a Slovenská Federativní Republika (Miss ČSFR) (English: Miss Czechoslovak Federative Republic (Miss CSFR)). Internationally, the contest was referred to Miss Československo/Miss Czechoslovakia.

==== 1993 – 2009 ====
In 1993, Czechoslovakia split into two nations, the Czech Republic/Czechia and the Slovak Republic/Slovakia, the pageant as a result was held one last time as Miss České a Slovenské Republiky (English: Miss Czech and Slovak Republic). Earlier that year the first Miss Slovakia/Miss Slovensko was held and in 1994, the original organizers restructured the pageant into Miss České republiky for the Czech Republic only with the first edition taking place. The director and head person in charge from 1989 to 2008 was Miloš Zapletal. In 2009, Zapletal departed and was replaced with the 2006 winner and Miss World 2006, Taťána Kuchařová who held the 2009 contest before the Czech national pageant merger in 2010.

=== National Pageant Merger in 2010 ===
In 2005, a rival pageant was started and was able to outbid this pageant to acquire franchising rights for Miss Universe and crowned a new delegate for Miss Universe 2005. In 2010, Miss České republiky and the rival pageant, Česká Miss merged under the direction of former Miss Československo (English: Miss Czechoslovakia) of 1991, Michaela Maláčová, and two winners were selected, one for Miss Universe and the other for Miss World.

=== Present-day contest ===
==== Present day contest: Since 2018 ====
In 2018, the Miss České republiky pageant returned after the organizers of Miss Léta discontinued the Miss Léta pageant after acquiring the trademark and intellectual rights to Miss České republiky.

== Titleholders ==
Year	Titleholders	Runners-up	
Year	Early winners Ideální Dívka Čech / Ideal Czech Girl (1910; 1918)	1st runner-up	2nd runner-up
1910	Růžena Brožová	Josefína Nováková	Anna Světlá
1918	Renátie Machálková	Blanka Dolanská	Antonie Čáslavská
Year	Interbellum Ideální Dívka Československa / The Ideal Girl of Czechoslovakia (1919; 1927–1928; 1930; 1935; 1937–1939) Ideální Dívka Čech a Moravy / Ideal Girl of Bohemia and Moravia (1940)	1st runner-up	2nd runner-up
1919	Ludmila Dostálová	—	—
1927	Eliška Poznerová; Bohemia (Prague)	Anežka Trojková, Anny Ondráková	
1928	Marie Kopecká	Anna Pavelková	Helena Sováková
1930	Milada Dostálová	Lucie Kostková	Eva Sobotková
1931	Julia Janowetz	—	—
1935	Trude Böhm	Taťána Mačková	Daniela Votrubová
1937	Karolína Marková	Iveta Růžičková	Simona Černá
1938	Hana Lounová	Jana Krumlová	Stanislava Bartošová
1939	Linda Michálková	Renata Sokolová	Markéta Divá
1940	Veronika Zpěváková	Heidy Müller	Anna Bayer
Year	Post World War II/Pre modern day Miss Československo / Miss Czechoslovakia and Dívka Roku Československa / Girl of the Year of Czechslovakia (1948 & 1966–1970)	1st runner-up	2nd runner-up
1948	unknown	—	—
1966	Dagmar Silvínová	Pavlína Novotná	Ildiga Tůmová
1967	Alžbeta Štrkulová; East Slovak Region (Košice)	Zuzana Porízková	Iva Filipová
1968	Jarmila Teplánová	Jiřina Chmátalová	Irena Nováčíková
1969	Kristina Hanzalová (Bratislava)	Marcela Bitnarova	Marta Rausuvá
1970	Miroslava Jančíková	Xenie Hallová	Eva Fiedlerová
Year	Miss Československo / Miss Czechoslovakia (1989–1992)	1st runner-up	2nd runner-up
1989	Ivana Christová; East Slovak Region (Prešov)	Jana Hronková; West Bohemia (Plzeň)	Michaela Polívková; East Bohemia (Hradec Králové)
1990	Renata Gorecká; North Moravia (Moravian-Silesian)	Andrea Rozkovcová (Central Bohemia)	Ingrid Ondrovičová (Bratislava)
1991	Michaela Maláčová (South Moravia)	Andrea Tatarková; East Slovak Region (Košice)	Markéta Silná; South Moravia (Zlín)
1992	Pavlína Babůrková; North Bohemia (Liberec)	Gabriela Haršányová (Bratislava)	Štěpánka Týcová; North Bohemia (Ústí nad Labem)
Year	Miss České a Slovenské Republiky / Miss Czech and Slovak Republic (1993)	1st runner-up	2nd runner-up
1993	Silvia Lakatošová (Bratislava)	Karin Majtánová (Bratislava)	Simona Smejkalová (Prague)
Year	Miss České Republiky (1994–2009)	1st runner-up	2nd runner-up
1994	Eva Kotulánová (South Moravia)	Kateřina Vondrová; North Bohemia (Ústí nad Labem)	Lenka Beličková; West Bohemia (Karlovy Vary)
1995	Monika Žídková; North Moravia (Moravia-Silesia)	Kateřina Kasalová; East Bohemia (Pardubice)	Renata Hornofová (Prague)
1996	Petra Minářová; North Moravia (Olomouc)	Iva Kubelková (Prague)	Zdenka Zadrazilova (South Bohemia)
1997	Terezie Dobrovolná (South Moravia)	Kristýna Fridvalská (Central Bohemia)	Gabriela Justinová (North Moravia (Olomouc)
1998	Kateřina Stočesová (Central Bohemia)	Alena Šeredová (Prague)	Petra Faltýnová (Prague)
1999	Helena Houdová; West Bohemia (Plzeň)	Šárka Sikorová; North Moravia (Moravia-Silesia)	Jitka Kocurová (Central Bohemia)
2000	Michaela Salačová; East Bohemia (Vysočina)	Kateřina Elgerová; West Bohemia (Plzeň)	Markéta Svobodná (South Bohemia)
2001	Diana Kobzanová (Liberec)	Andrea Fišerová (Ústí nad Labem)	Andrea Vránová (Ústí nad Labem)
2002	Kateřina Průšová (Liberec)	Kateřina Smržová (Prague)	Radka Kocurová (Moravia-Silesia)
2003	Lucie Váchová (Central Bohemia)	Klára Medková (South Moravia)	Markéta Divišová (Prague)
2004	Jana Doleželová (Olomouc)	Michaela Wostlová (South Bohemia)	Edita Horthová (South Moravia)
2005	Lucie Králová (Ústí nad Labem)	Petra Macháčková (Central Bohemia)	Agáta Hanychová (Prague)
2006	Taťána Kuchařová (Hradec Králové)	Kateřina Pospíšilová (Prague)	Renáta Czadernová (Moravia-Silesia)
2007	Kateřina Sokolová (Olomouc)	Veronika Pompeová (Olomouc)	Veronika Chmelířová (South Bohemia)
2008	Zuzana Jandová (Moravia-Silesia)	Zuzana Putnářová (Moravia-Silesia)	Kristýna Lebedová (Zlín)
2009	Aneta Vignerová (Moravia-Silesia)	Lucie Smatanová (Prague)	Hana Věrná (Zlín)
Year	Miss České Republiky (2018–present)	1st runner-up	2nd runner-up
2018	Iveta Maurerová (South Moravia)	Tereza Bohuslavová (Ústí nad Labem)	Kristýna Malířová (Ústí nad Labem)
2019	Nikola Kokyová (Central Bohemia)	Sára Lyčková (Moravia-Silesia)	Dominika Benáková (Hradec Králové)
2020	Jana Krojidlová (Central Bohemia)	Valerie Herianová (Ústí nad Labem)	Kateřina Šimonková (Moravia-Silesia)
2021	Helena Čermáková (Zlín)	Sarah Horáková (South Moravia)	Valerie Váňová (Ústí nad Labem)
2022	Andrea Kaplanová (Ústí nad Labem Region)	Pavlína Jagrová (Pardubice)	Karolina Budka (Prague)
2023	Bára Sulanová (South Bohemia)	Valerie Přecechtělová (Olomouc)	Viktorie Louženská (Hradec Králové)
2024	Karin Bacilková (South Moravia)	Adéla Herčíková (Prague)	Nikoleta Domdjoni (Central Bohemia)
2025	Miriam Sais (Prague)	Isabella Rossini (Prague)	Karolína Kuhnová (Moravia-Silesia)

=== Gallery ===
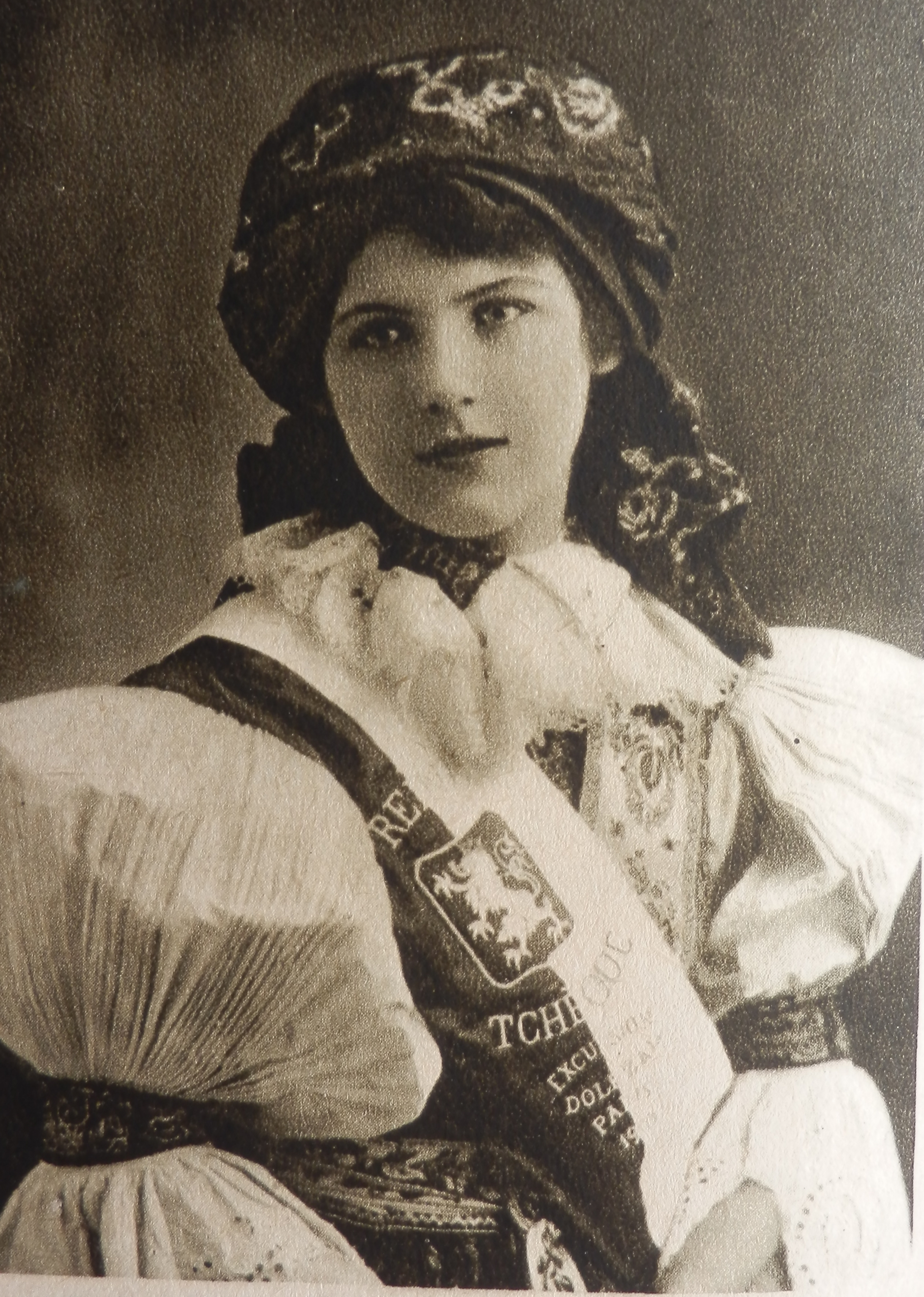
Růžena Brožová,
1910 winner

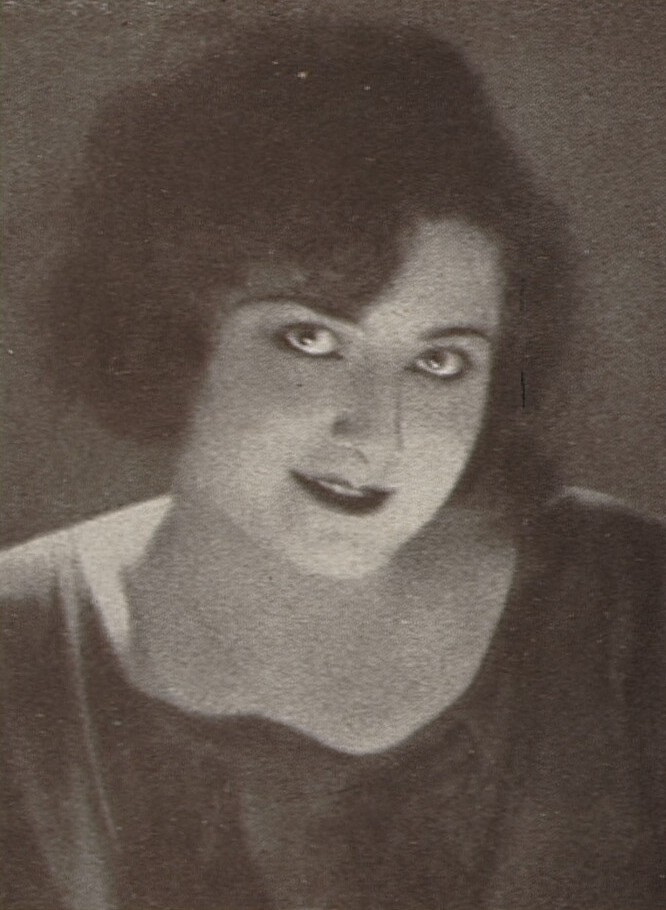
Eliška Poznerová,
1927 winner

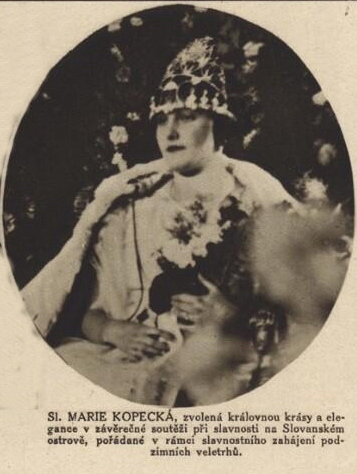
Marie Kopecká,
1928 winner

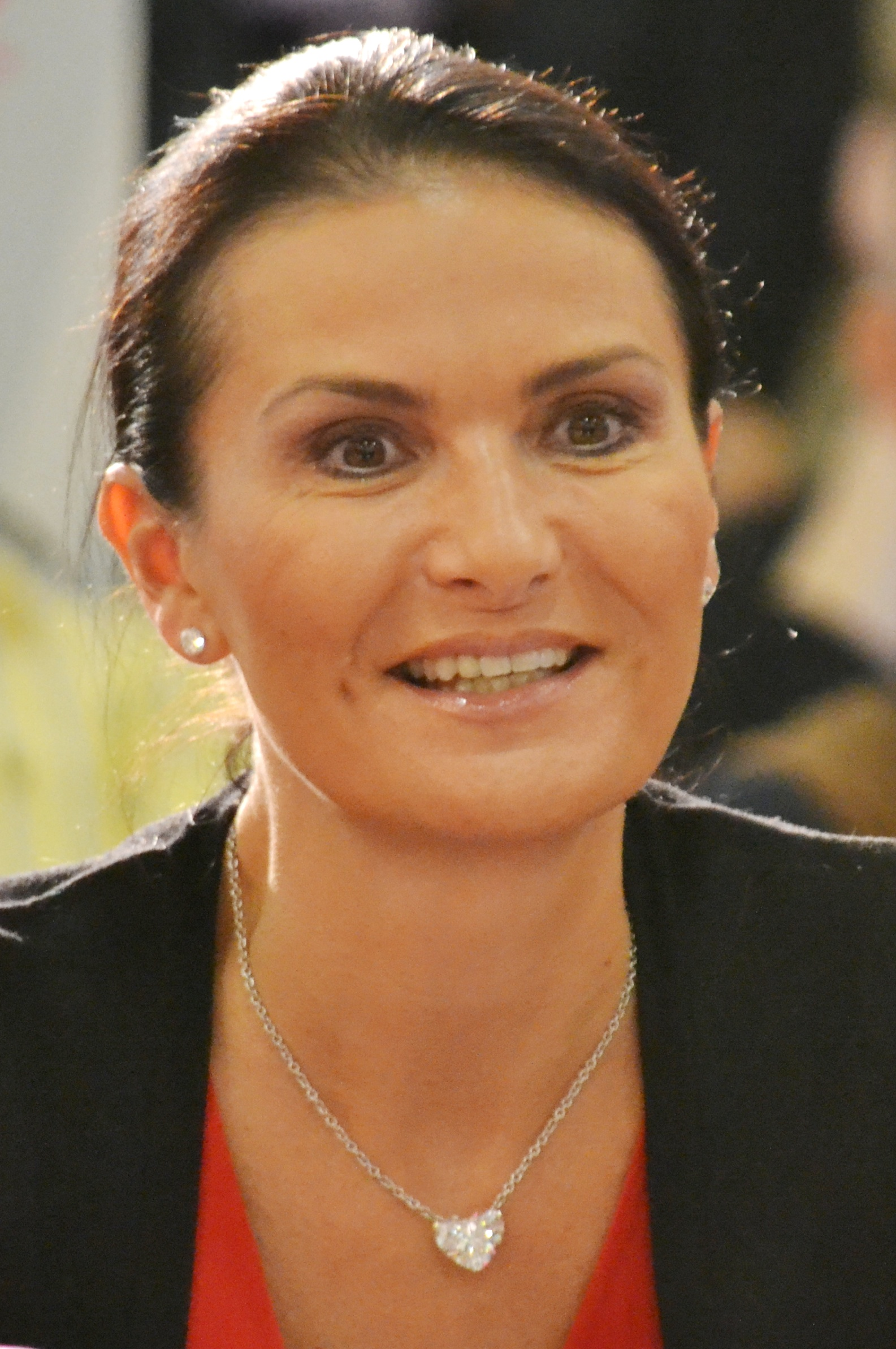
Michaela Maláčová (pictured in 2013),
1991 winner

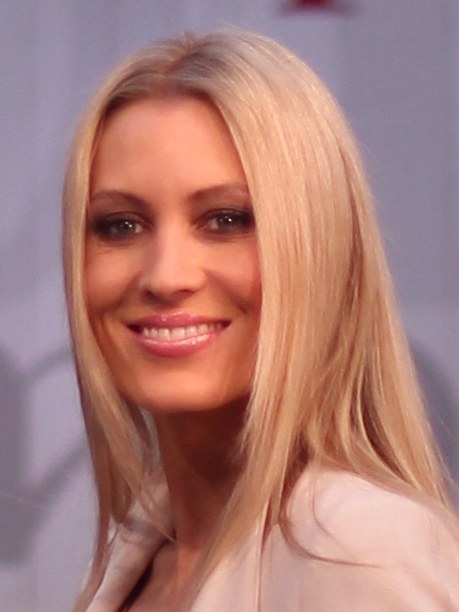
Kateřina Průšová (pictured in 2015),
2002 winner

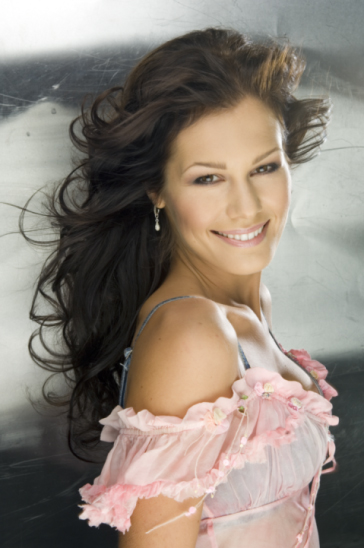
Jana Doleželová (pictured in 2007),
2004 winner

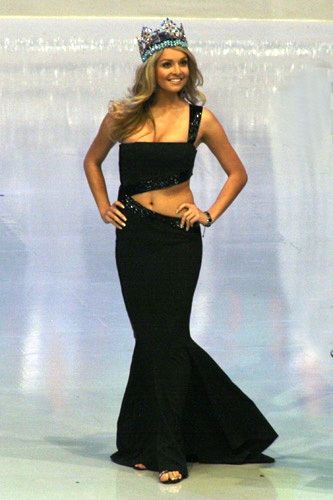
Taťána Kuchařová,
2006 winner and Miss World 2006

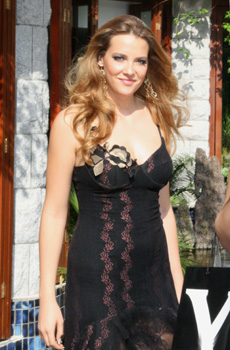
Kateřina Sokolová,
2007 winner

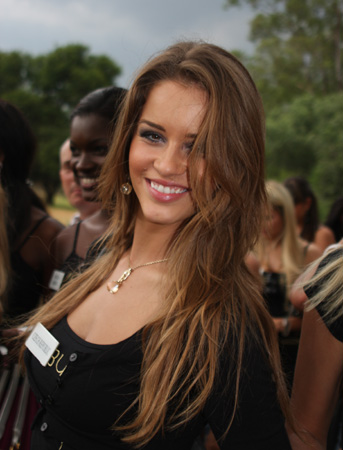
Zuzana Jandová,
2008 winner

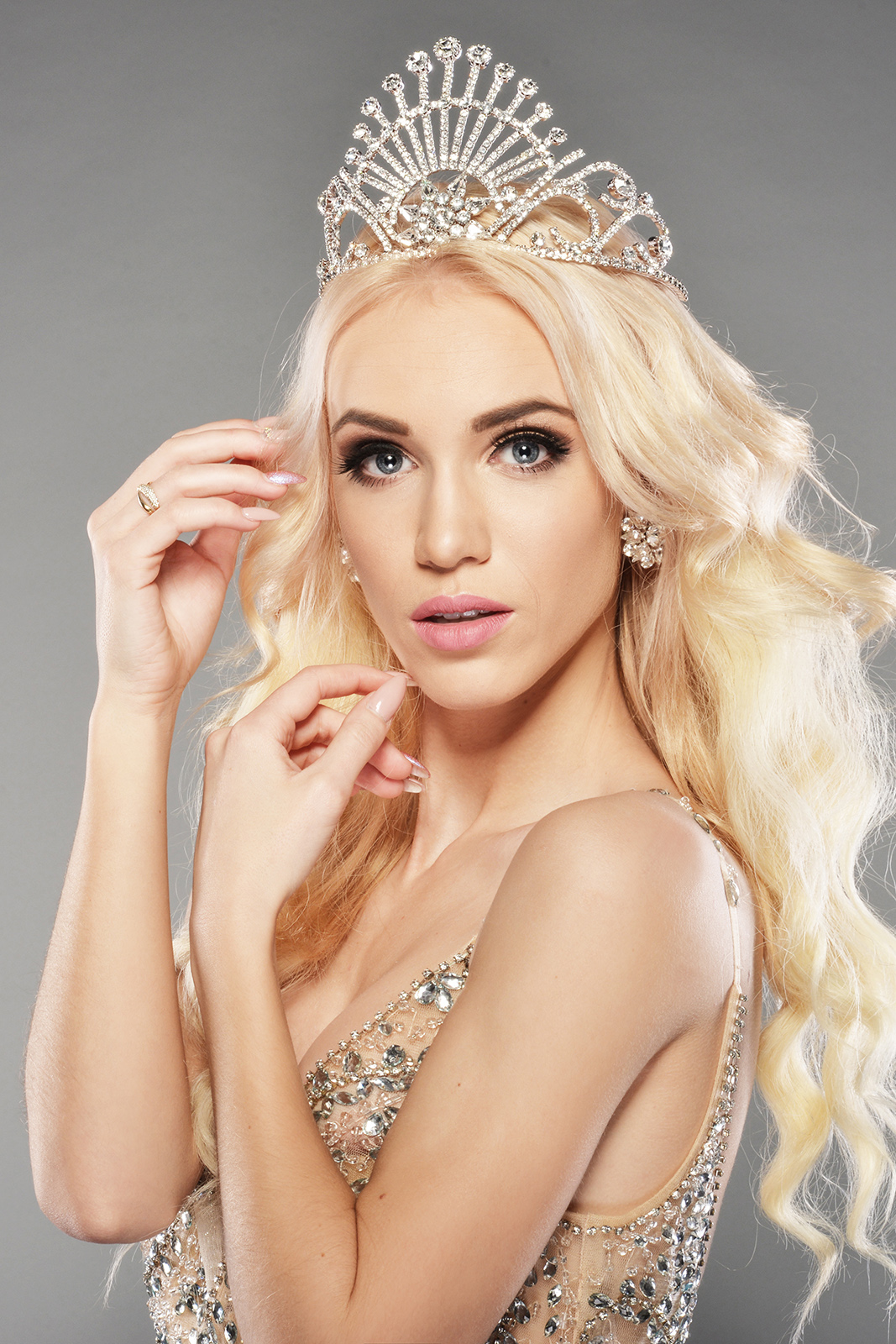
Iveta Maurerová,
2018 winner

== International pageant representatives ==
- : Declared as Winner
- : Ended as runner-up or top 5/6 qualification
- : Ended as one of the finalists or semifinalists
- : Ended as special awards winner

=== Miss Europe ===
Year	Region	Representative's Name	Placement	Special Awards	Title
2007	South Bohemia	Veronika Chmelířová	Did not compete. Miss Europe 2007 was postponed and eventually cancelled indefinitely.		2nd Runner-Up at Miss České republiky 2007
2006	Pardubice	Daniela Frantzová	Unplaced		Top 4 finalist at Miss České republiky 2005
2005	South Moravia	Edita Hortová	Top 12		2nd Runner-Up at Miss České republiky 2004
2004	No contest in 2004.				
2003	Prague	Markéta Divišová	Unplaced		2nd Runner-Up at Miss České republiky 2003
2002	Moravia-Silesia	Radka Kocurová	Unplaced		2nd Runner-Up at Miss České republiky 2002
2001	Prague	Ema Černáková	Unplaced		Top 6 Finalist at Miss České republiky 2001
2000	No contest in 2000.				
1999	Central Bohemia	Jitka Kocurová	4th Runner-Up		2nd Runner-Up at Miss České republiky 1999
1998	No contest in 1998.				
1997	Central Bohemia	Kristýna Fridvalská	Top 12		1st Runner-Up at Miss České republiky 1997
1996	Prague	Iva Kubelková	Unplaced		1st Runner-Up at Miss České Republiky 1996
1995	North Moravia (Moravia-Silesia)	Monika Žídková	Miss Europe 1995		Miss České republiky 1995
1994	North Bohemia (Ústecký)	Kateřina Vondrová	Unplaced		1st Runner-Up at Miss České republiky 1994
1993	Moravia	Jana Rybská	Unplaced		Top 5 Finalist at Miss Czech and Slovak Republic 1993
Miss Československo / Miss Czechoslovakia
1992	North Bohemia (Liberec)	Pavlína Babůrková	1st Runner-Up		Miss Československo 1992
1991	—	UNKNOWN	4th Runner-Up		—
Did not compete from 1972 to 1988. No contest 1975, 1977, 1979, 1983, 1986, 1987, 1989 & 1990.
1971	—	Miroslava Jančíková	Did not compete after Hanzalová fled to West Germany to request political asylum which prompted the government to ban beauty pageants and forbid the already crowned titleholders from competing internationally.		Dívka Roku Československa 1970
1970	—	Kristina Hanzalová	Did not compete after Hanzalová fled to West Germany to request political asylum which prompted the government to ban beauty pageants and forbid the already crowned titleholders from competing internationally.		Dívka Roku Československa 1969
1969	—	Jarmila Teplanová	Unplaced		Dívka Roku Československa 1968
1968	East Slovak Region (Košice)	Alžbeta Štrkulová	Unplaced		Dívka Roku Československa 1967
Did not compete from 1949 to 1967. No contest in 1951.
1948	—	UNKNOWN	Unplaced		Miss Československo 1948
Did not compete between 1936 & 1938. No contest from 1939 to 1947 due to World War II.
1935	—	Trude Böhm	Unplaced		Ideální Dívka Československa 1935
Did not compete in 1933 & 1934.
1932	–	Julia Janowetz	Unplaced		–
1931	Did not compete in 1931.				
1930	—	Milada Dostálová	Unplaced		Ideální Dívka Československa 1930
1929	Did not compete in 1929. No contest in 1928.				
1928	Did not compete in 1929. No contest in 1928.				
1927	Bohemia (Prague)	Eliška Poznerová	Unplaced		Ideální Dívka Československa 1927

=== Miss World ===
Year	Region	Representative's Name	Placement	Special Awards	Title
2009	Moravia-Silesia	Aneta Vignerová	Unplaced		Miss České republiky 2009
2008	Moravia-Silesia	Zuzana Jandová	Unplaced		Miss České republiky 2008
2007	Olomouc	Kateřina Sokolová	Unplaced		Miss České republiky 2007
2006	Hradec Králové	Taťána Kuchařová	Miss World 2006	Miss World Northern Europe	Miss České republiky 2006
2005	Ústecký	Lucie Králová	Unplaced		Miss České republiky 2005
2004	Olomouc	Jana Doleželová	Top 15		Miss České republiky 2004
2003	Central Bohemia	Lucie Váchová	Unplaced		Miss České republiky 2003
2002	Prague	Kateřina Smržová	Unplaced		1st Runner-Up at Miss České republiky 2002
2001	Ústecký	Andrea Fišerová	Unplaced		1st Runner-Up at Miss České republiky 2001
2000	East Bohemia (Vysočina)	Michaela Salačová	Unplaced		Miss České republiky 2000
1999	West Bohemia (Plzeň)	Helena Houdová	Unplaced		Miss České republiky 1999
1998	Prague	Alena Šeredová	Top 5		1st Runner-Up at Miss České republiky 1998
1997	North Moravia (Moravia-Silesia)	Terezie Dobrovolná	Unplaced		Miss České republiky 1997
1996	North Moravia (Olomouc)	Petra Minářová	Unplaced		Miss České republiky 1996
1995	East Bohemia (Pardubice)	Kateřina Kasalová	Unplaced		1st Runner-Up at Miss České republiky 1995
1994	West Bohemia (Karlovy Vary)	Lenka Beličková	Unplaced		2nd Runner-Up at Miss České republiky 1994
Miss World Czech Republic 1993, Miss Czech and Slovak 1993 2nd Runner-Up appointed to represent the CR at Miss World 1993
1993	Prague	Simona Smejkalová	Unplaced		2nd Runner-Up at Miss Czech and Slovak Republic 1993
Miss Československo / Miss Czechoslovakia
1992	East Slovak Region (Košice)	Gabriela Haršányová	Unplaced		1st Runner-Up at Miss Československo 1992
1991	East Slovak Region (Košice)	Andrea Tatarková	Unplaced		1st Runner-Up at Miss Československo 1991
1990	Central Bohemia	Andrea Rozkovcová	Unplaced		1st Runner-Up at Miss Československo 1990
1989	West Bohemia (Plzeň)	Jana Hronková	Unplaced		1st Runner-Up at Miss Československo 1989
Did not compete from 1971 to 1988.
1970	—	Xenie Hallová	Did not compete		1st Runner-Up at Dívka Roku Československa 1970
1969	—	Marcela Bitnarova	Top 15		1st Runner-Up at Dívka Roku Československa 1969
1968	Did not compete in 1968.				
1967	East Slovak Region (Košice)	Alžbeta Štrkulová	Top 7/5th Runner-Up		Dívka Roku Československa 1967
1966	—	Dagmar Silvínová	Did not compete, no permission from the government		Dívka Roku Československa 1966
Did not compete from 1951 to 1965.

=== Miss Universe ===
Year	Region	Representative's Name	Placement	Special Awards	Title
2005	Olomouc	Jana Doleželová	Did not compete. Miss České republiky lost the Miss Universe license to the newly formed Česká Miss pageant.		Miss České republiky 2004
2004	Central Bohemia	Lucie Váchová	Unplaced		Miss České republiky 2003
2003	Prague	Kateřina Smržová	Top 10		1st Runner-Up at Miss České republiky 2002
2002	Liberec	Diana Kobzanová	Unplaced		Miss České republiky 2001
2001	South Moravia	Petra Kocarová	Unplaced		Top 6 Finalist at Miss České republiky 2000
2000	Central Bohemia	Jitka Kocurová	Unplaced		2nd Runner-Up at Miss České republiky 1999
1999	Prague	Petra Faltýnová	Unplaced		2nd Runner-Up at Miss České republiky 1998
1998	Central Bohemia	Kristýna Fridvalská	Unplaced		1st Runner-Up at Miss České republiky 1997
1997	North Moravia (Olomouc)	Petra Minářová	Unplaced		Miss České republiky 1996
1996	Prague	Renata Hornofová	Unplaced		2nd Runner-Up at Miss České republiky 1995
1995	South Moravia	Eva Kotulánová	Unplaced		Miss České republiky 1994
1994	Did not compete in 1994.				
Miss Universe Czech Republic 1993, Miss Československo / Miss Czechoslovakia 1992 appointed to represent the CR at Miss Universe 1993
1993	North Bohemia (Liberec)	Pavlína Babůrková	Top 10		Miss Československo 1992
Miss Československo / Miss Czechoslovakia
1992	South Moravia	Michaela Maláčová	Unplaced		Miss Československo 1991
1991	North Moravia (Moravia-Silesia)	Renata Gorecká	Unplaced		Miss Československo 1990
1990	West Bohemia (Plzeň)	Jana Hronková	Top 10		1st Runner-Up Miss Československo 1989
Did not compete from 1972 to 1989.
1971	—	Miroslava Jančíková	Did not compete due to Czechoslovak government banning beauty pageants after Miss Universe 1970		Dívka Roku Československa 1970
1970	—	Kristina Hanzalová	Top 15		Dívka Roku Československa 1969
Did not compete from 1952 to 1969.

=== Miss International ===
Year	Region	Representative's Name	Placement	Special Awards	Title
2010	Central Bohemia	Lucie Smatanová	Unplaced		1st Runner-Up at Miss České republiky 2009
2009	South Moravia	Darja Jacukevičová	Unplaced		Finalist at Miss České republiky 2008
2008	Moravia-Silesia	Zuzana Putnářová	4th Runner-Up		1st Runner-Up at Miss České republiky 2008
2007	Olomouc	Veronika Pompeová	Top 15		1st Runner-Up at Miss České republiky 2007
2006	Prague	Kateřina Pospíšilová	Unplaced		1st Runner-Up at Miss České republiky 2006
2005	Central Bohemia	Petra Macháčková	Unplaced		1st Runner-Up at Miss České republiky 2005
2004	South Bohemia	Michaela Wostlová	Unplaced		1st Runner-Up at Miss České republiky 2004
2003	South Moravia	Klára Medková	Did not compete		1st Runner-Up at Miss České republiky 2003
2002	Ústecký	Lenka Taussigová	Top 12		Top 6 Finalist at Miss České republiky 2002
2001	Ústecký	Andrea Vránová	Unplaced		2nd Runner-Up at Miss České republiky 2001
2000	South Bohemia	Markéta Svobodná	Top 15		2nd Runner-Up at Miss České republiky 2000
1999	North Moravia (Moravia-Silesia)	Šárka Sikorová	Top 15		1st Runner-Up at Miss České republiky 1999
1998	Prague	Petra Faltýnová	Top 15		2nd Runner-Up at Miss České republiky 1998
1997	North Moravia (Olomouc)	Gabriela Justinová	Unplaced		2nd Runner-Up at Miss České republiky 1997
1996	South Bohemia	Zdenka Zadražilová	Unplaced		2nd Runner-Up at Miss České republiky 1996
1995	Prague	Renata Hornofová	2nd Runner-Up		2nd Runner-Up at Miss České republiky 1995
1994	Did not compete in 1993 & 1994.				
1993	Did not compete in 1993 & 1994.				
Miss Československo / Miss Czechoslovakia
1992	North Bohemia (Ústecký)	Štěpánka Týcová	Unplaced		2nd Runner-Up at Miss Československo 1992
1991	South Moravia (Zlín)	Markéta Silná	2nd Runner-Up		2nd Runner-Up at Miss Československo 1991
1990	Bratislava	Ingrid Ondrovičová	1st Runner-Up		2nd Runner-Up at Miss Československo 1990
Did not compete from 1960 to 1989.

=== Miss Supranational ===
Year	Region	Representative's Name	Placement	Special Awards	Title
2010	Zlín	Hana Věrná	1st Runner-Up		2nd Runner-Up at Miss České republiky 2009
Miss Supranational Czech Republic — Official Designation
2009	Olomouc	Aneta Zelená	Unplaced		Miss Supranational Czech Republic 2009

=== Miss Globe ===
Year	Region	Representative's Name	Placement	Special Awards	Title
2020	Central Bohemia	Nikola Kokyová	Top 15	Miss Elegance	Miss České republiky 2019
2019	Ústecký	Kristýna Malířová	4th Runner-Up		2nd Runner-Up at Miss České republiky 2018

=== Miss Aura International ===
Year	Region	Representative's Name	Placement	Special Awards	Title
2020	Moravia-Silesia	Sára Lyčková	Top 15		1st Runner-Up at Miss České republiky 2019
2019	Ústecký	Kristýna Malířová	Miss Aura International 2019		2nd Runner-Up at Miss České republiky 2018
