= Kateřina Pospíšilová =

Kateřina Pospíšilová (born 2 May 1983) is a Czech model, actress and first runner-up of Miss Czech Republic 2006, and her country's representative at Miss International 2006 in China and Japan.

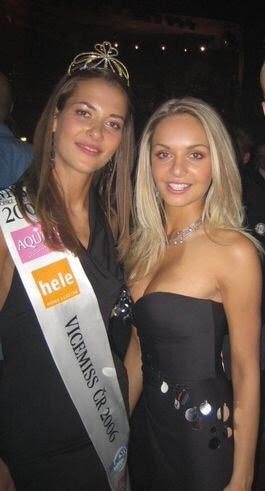
Kateřina Pospíšilová and Taťána Kuchařová

== Modeling and acting career ==
Pospíšilová was born in Prague, Czechoslovakia. From an early age, she was doing voice-overs for many international movies and TV series. She studied music-drama department at the prestigious Prague Conservatory. At the age of 19 Pospíšilová joined Elite Model management who had sent her for her first contract to South Korea. Many countries followed. At the age of 22 she returned to Prague, where she participated in the Miss Czech Republic and became 1st runner-up, 2nd after Miss World 2006, Taťána Kuchařová.

At the same time, Pospíšilová landed a role Naďa Mázlová in one of the TV series, Ordinace v Růžové zahradě.

During her modelling career, Pospíšilová has been featured in several magazines including Esquire, Elle, Elele and worked with well known fashion designers and photographers including Simon Upton, Russel Wong and Lucie Robinson.

== Personal life ==
Pospíšilová always claimed that she wanted to be able to support the arts. In 2006, Pospíšilová became the brand ambassador for a non-profit organization E-moc-e that supports artists in the Czech Republic. E-moc-e has enabled over 100 artists to exhibit their artwork in local galleries as well as in an online gallery. Since 2011 Pospíšilová has lived in London, United Kingdom where she has worked in art & interior design industry for international design brands including Lasvit, Harlequin London and Original BTC before starting her passion project at COSHAMIE.

Pospíšilová is married to Xavier Daza, a founding member of the indie rock band equape.

== Filmography ==
- TV, film and radio
- Dokonalý svět / TV series / 2010
- Dobrá čtvrť / TV series / 2008
- Nemocnice na kraji města /
- O uloupené divožence / TV movie
- Trapasy / TV movie /
- Bestiář / TV movie /
- 3+1 s Miroslavem Donutilem
- Ordinace v Růžové zahradě / TV series / 2006–2008
- Trapasy (TV series) 2007
- Ranč U Zelené sedmy (TV Series) 2005
- Sotto Falso Nome
- P.F. 77 / TV movie / 2003
- Vana / TV movie / 2003
