= Scherner =

Scherner is a surname. Notable people with the surname include:

- Fabiano Scherner (born 1972), German-Brazilian mixed martial artist
- Julian Scherner (1895–1945), Nazi Party official
- Karl Albert Scherner (1825–1889), German philosopher

== See also ==
- Scherer
