= Engin Çağlar =

Turkish actor (1940–2025)

Engin Çağlar (28 August 1940 – 31 October 2025) was a Turkish actor.

== Life and career ==
Çağlar completed his education at Şişli Terakki High School and Robert College, and also studied interior architecture in Germany. Çağlar became known to a wider audience in 1969 with the film Kınalı Yapıncak, in which he played alongside Hülya Koçyiğit.

He married Filiz Vural, Miss Europe 1971, in 1972. The couple have two sons.

Çağlar was injured after being hit by a motorcycle while crossing the road in Şişli on 31 October 2025. He was taken to the hospital, but was later pronounced dead. Çağlar was 85. On 2 November, he was interred at Zincirlikuyu Cemetery.

== Filmography ==
- 1968: Kadın Değil Baş Belası
- 1968: Öksüz
- 1969: Bana Derler Fosforlu
- 1969: Çingene Aşkı Paprika
- 1969: Hüzünlü Aşk
- 1969: Kınalı Yapıncak
- 1969: Allah Aşkı Yarattı
- 1969: Günah Bende mi?
- 1969: Ninno
- 1969: Ömür Boyu
- 1969: Vatansızlar
- 1969: Yalnız Adam
- 1969: Yaşamak Ne Güzel Şey
- 1970: Babaların Günahı
- 1970: Civan Ali
- 1970: Kafkas Şahini
- 1970: Paralı Askerler
- 1970: Son Günah
- 1970: Yaban Gülü
- 1970: Afacan
- 1970: Deliormanlı
- 1970: Hippi Perihan
- 1970: İntikam Derler Adıma
- 1970: Kanlı Kader
- 1970: Komando Memet
- 1970: On Kadına Bir Erkek
- 1971: Feride
- 1971: Afacan Küçük Serseri
- 1971: Beyaz Kelebekler
- 1971: Makber
- 1971: Rüzgâr Murat
- 1972: Bir Garip Yolcu
- 1972: Rüyalar Gerçek Olsa
- 1972: Damdaki Kemancı
- 1972: Karmen
- 1972: Satılık Kadın
- 1972: Sen Alın Yazımsın
- 1972: Süreyya
- 1973: Dağdan İnme
- 1973: İntizar
- 1974: Almanya’da Bir Türk Kızı
- 1974: Çam Sakızı
- 1974: Hasret
- 1974: Talihsiz Yavrum
- 1981: Ümmiye / Sevdiğim Sensin
- 1983: Çile Dünyası
- 1983: İlişki
- 1984: Hüzün
- 1984: Şaşkın Gelin
- 1985: Yetim
- 1986: Dağlı Güvercin
- 1986: Gariplerin Şarkısı
- 1986: Yuvaya Dönüş
- 1988: Ölümünün 400. Yılında Mimar Sinan
- 1989: El Kızı
- 1993: Ağlama Sevgilim
- 1993: Anne ve Kızı
- 1993: Seni Kaybedersem
- 1994: Minnet Borcu
- 1996: Bir Şenliktir Yaşamak
- 1997: Ana Kuzusu
- 1997: Yasemin
- 1998: Mualla
- 2000: Süper Kurşunsuz
- 2001: Cinayetin Sırrı
- 2001: Günah
- 2003: Dilan
- 2003: Yeşilçam Denizi
- 2004: Büyük Buluşma
- 2006: Kılıbıklar Mahallesi
- 2007: Hicran Sokağı
- 2008: Kırmızı Işık
- 2009: Geniş Aile
- 2009: IV. Osman
- 2010: Gül ve Peri
- 2012: Gece Yolcuları Recep ile Selena
- 2015: Bitmeyen Aşk
