= Miss Europe 1994 =

International beauty pageant

- Date: September 30, 1994
- Venue: Istanbul, Turkey
- Entrants: 33
- Placements: 12
- Debuts: Latvia
- Withdrawals: Switzerland
- Returns: Belgium; Hungary; Latvia
- Winner: Lilach Ben-Simon; Israel
- Congeniality: Pamela van der Berg (Holland)
- Photogenic: Didem Uzel (Turkey)

Miss Europe 1994 was the 49th edition of the Miss Europe pageant and the 38th edition under the Mondial Events Organization. It was held in Istanbul, Turkey on September 30, 1994. Lilach Ben-Simon of Israel, was crowned Miss Europe 1994 by outgoing titleholder Arzum Onan of Turkey.

== Results ==
=== Placements ===
Placement	Contestant
Miss Europe 1994	Israel – Lilach Ben-Simon
1st Runner-Up	Turkey – Didem Uzel
2nd Runner-Up	Ukraine – Nataliy Shvachiy
3rd Runner-Up	England – Amanda Louise Johnson
4th Runner-Up	Holland – Pamela van der Berg
Top 12	Albania – Lida Reka; Finland – Tiia Annaleena Litja; Greece – Johanna Papadimitriou; Iceland – Margrét Skúladóttir Sigurz; Romania – Roberta Anastase; Slovak Republic – Nikoleta Mészarosová; Spain – Laura Marina Vicente Barreto

=== Special awards ===
Award	Contestant
Miss Friendship	(Netherlands) Holland – Pamela van der Berg
Miss Photogenic	Turkey – Didem Uzel

== Contestants ==
- Albania – Lida Reka
- Austria – Alexandra Gnezda
- Belgium – Katia Defraeye
- Bulgaria – Danaila Dimitrova
- Czech Republic – Kateřina Vondrová
- Denmark – D. Baden Nielsen
- England – Amanda Louise Johnson
- Estonia – Kristi Meriväli
- Finland – Tiia Annaleena Litja
- France – Carole Moretto
- Germany – Alexandra Klim
- Greece – Johanna Papadimitriou
- Holland – Pamela van der Berg
- Hungary – Zita Paikovics (Paukovics)
- Iceland – Margrét Skúladóttir Sigurz
- Ireland – Tara Logan
- Israel – Lilach Ben-Simon
- Italy – Stefania Del Zotto
- Latvia – Evija Zēberga
- Lithuania – Loreta Brusokaitė
- Luxembourg – Sandy Wagner
- Malta – Neolene Micallef
- Norway – Line Skavas
- Poland – Serafina Mąkowska
- Portugal – Mónica Sofia Borges Pereira
- Romania – Roberta Anastase
- Russia – Olga Sysoyeva
- Scotland – Sarah MacRae
- Slovak Republic – Nikoleta Mészarosová
- Spain – Laura Marina Vicente Barreto
- Sweden – Johanna Lundgren
- Turkey – Didem Uzel
- Ukraine – Nataliy Shvachiy

== Notes ==
=== Withdrawals ===
- Switzerland

=== Debuts/Returns ===
- Latvia – Was represented in 1927 as the Baltic States. This is the first time Latvia is competing as its own country.

=== Returns ===
- Belgium
- Hungary
