= Michael Frolík =

Czech ice hockey player (born 1988)

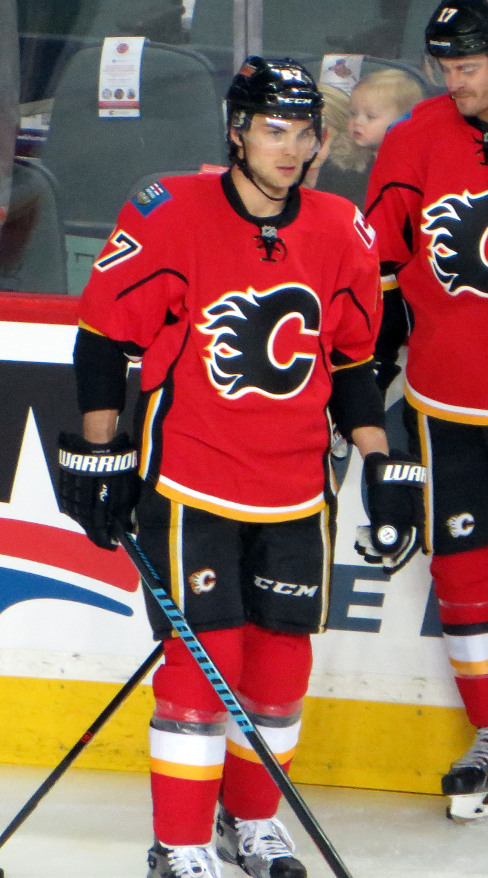
- Frolík with the Calgary Flames in 2016
- Born: 17 February 1988 (age 38) Kladno, Czechoslovakia
- Height: 6 ft 1 in (185 cm)
- Weight: 190 lb (86 kg; 13 st 8 lb)
- Position: Right wing
- Shot: Left
- Played for: Rytíři Kladno; Florida Panthers; Chicago Blackhawks; Piráti Chomutov; Winnipeg Jets; Calgary Flames; Buffalo Sabres; Montreal Canadiens; Lausanne HC; Bílí Tygři Liberec
- National team: Czech Republic
- NHL draft: 10th overall, 2006; Florida Panthers
- Playing career: 2004–2024

Michael Frolík (Czech pronunciation: [ˈmɪxaɛl ˈfroliːk]; born 17 February 1988) is a Czech former professional ice hockey right winger.

Frolík has previously played in the National Hockey League (NHL) with the Florida Panthers, the organization that selected him tenth overall in 2006, as well as the Chicago Blackhawks, with whom he won the Stanley Cup in 2013. He also had stints with the Winnipeg Jets, Calgary Flames, Buffalo Sabres and Montreal Canadiens.

== Playing career ==
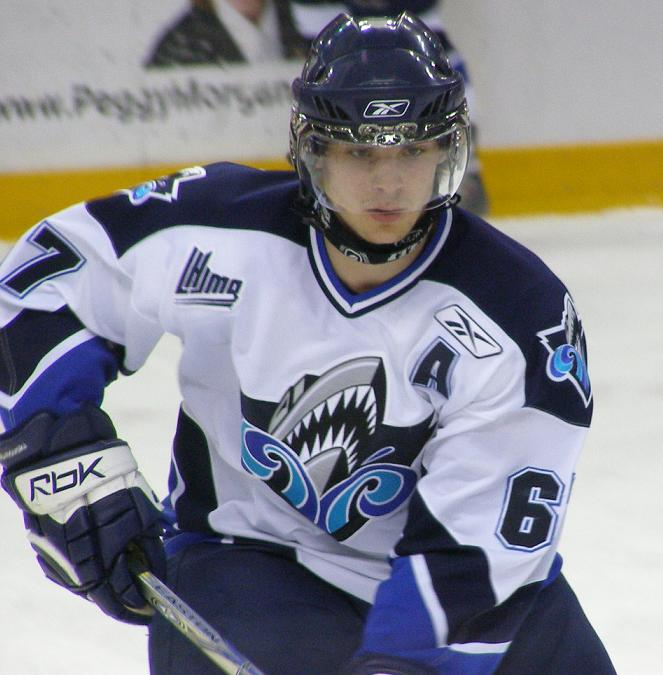
Frolík with the Rimouski Océanic in February 2008.

=== Amateur ===
As a youth, Frolík played in the 2002 Quebec International Pee-Wee Hockey Tournament with a team from Chomutov.

=== Junior ===
Beginning in the 2006–07 season, Frolík began his North American career playing at the major junior level for the Rimouski Océanic of the Quebec Major Junior Hockey League (QMJHL).

=== Professional ===
==== Florida Panthers ====
Frolík played two seasons in the Czech Extraliga for Rabat Kladno before being selected tenth overall in the 2006 NHL entry draft by the Florida Panthers. He made his NHL debut for Florida during the 2008–09 season, in which he finished with 21 goals and 24 assists for 45 points in 79 games. The following season, Frolík would record 43 points.

==== Chicago Blackhawks ====
On 9 February 2011, during Frolík's third season with the Panthers, he was traded to the Chicago Blackhawks (along with goaltender Alexander Salák) in exchange for Jack Skille, Hugh Jessiman and David Pacan. Frolík scored his first goal as a Blackhawk on 2 March 2011, against Miikka Kiprusoff the Calgary Flames where the Blackhawks won the game 6–4. On 13 April, he made his Stanley Cup playoff debut against the Presidents' Trophy-winning Vancouver Canucks. On 19 April, he scored his first career playoff goal against Canucks goaltender Roberto Luongo in game four of the Western Conference Quarterfinals and on 24 April, he scored the first Stanley Cup playoff penalty shot in Blackhawks history against Canucks goaltender Cory Schneider in game six of the Western Conference Quarterfinals.

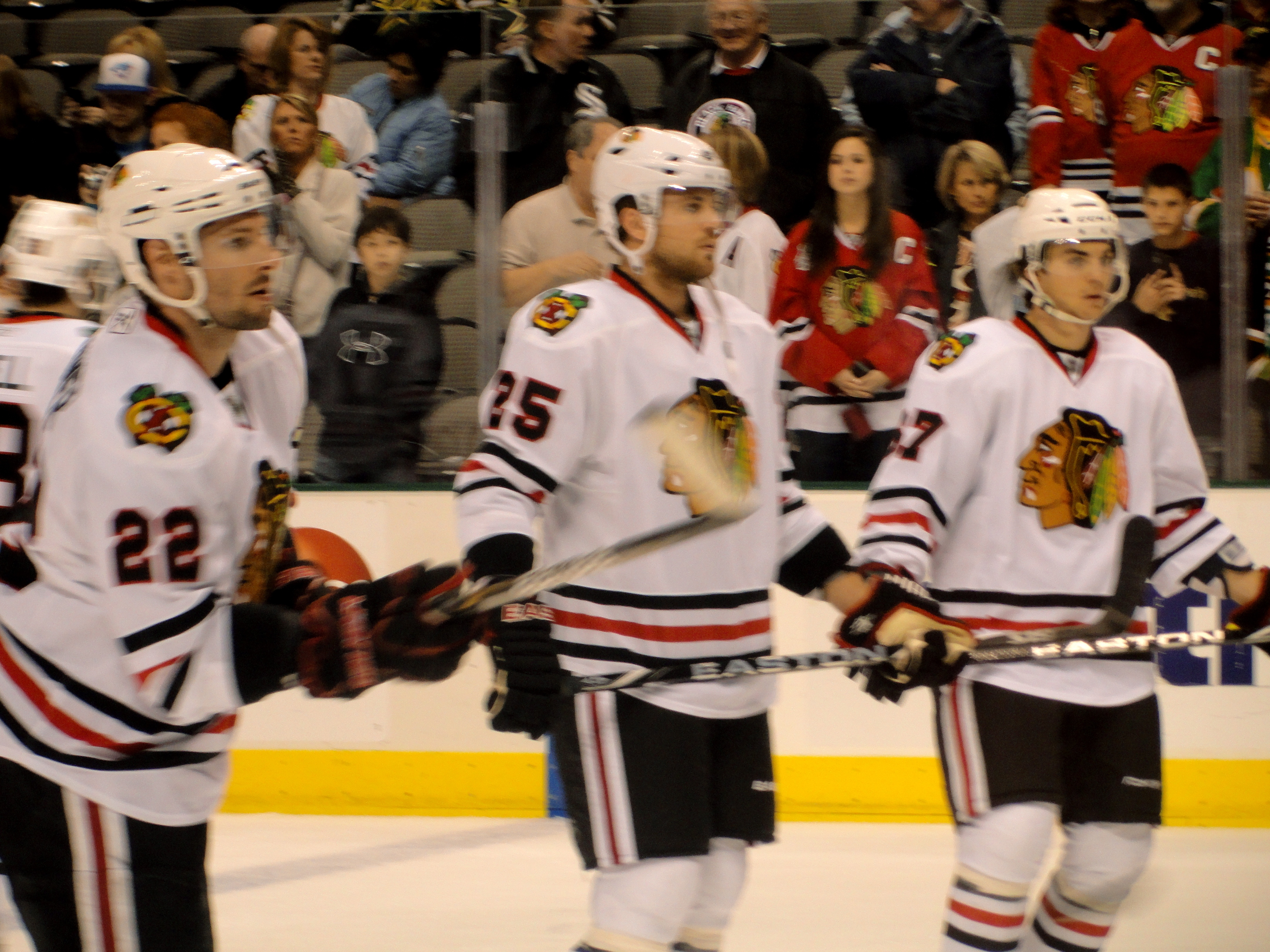
Frolík (right) during his tenure with the Chicago Blackhawks alongside Viktor Stålberg and Troy Brouwer in February 2011.

On 15 July 2011, Frolík signed a three-year contract extension with the Blackhawks at an annual average value of $2.333 million.

During the 2012–13 NHL lockout, Frolík played for Piráti Chomutov of the Czech Extraliga until returning to the Blackhawks for the 48-game shortened regular season in which he would play 45 games with three goals, seven assists and 10 points to help the Blackhawks win the Presidents' Trophy as the regular season champions. On 27 May 2013, during the 2013 playoffs, he scored the second playoff penalty shot goal of his career against Jimmy Howard of the Detroit Red Wings, becoming the first player in NHL history to score more than one career penalty shot goal in the playoffs. He ultimately scored ten points (three goals, seven assists) in the all 23 playoff games in en route to the Blackhawks' Stanley Cup victory over the Boston Bruins in six games including an assist on the Stanley Cup clinching goal in game six by Dave Bolland.

==== Winnipeg Jets ====
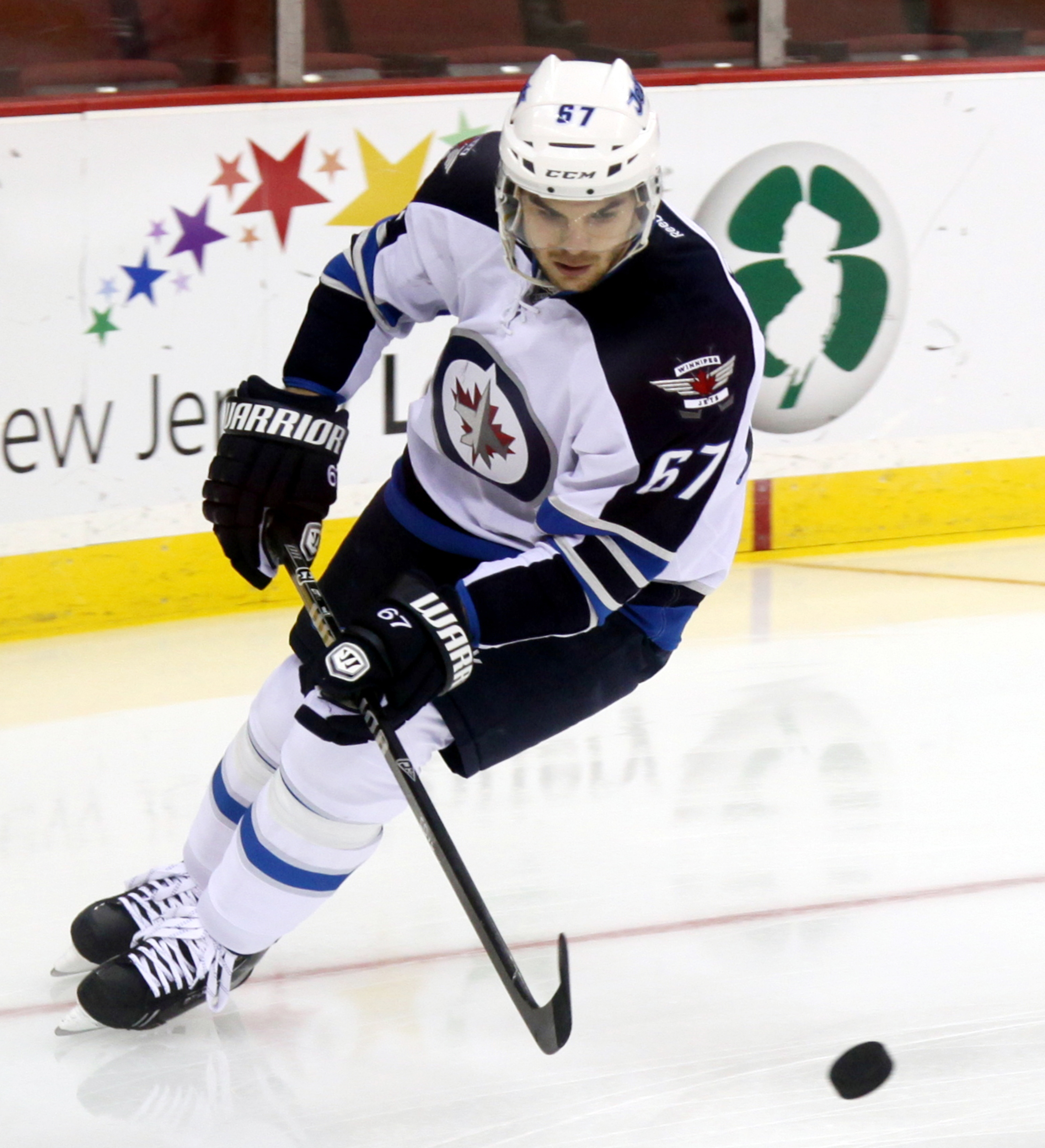
Frolik with the Winnipeg Jets in November 2013

In the subsequent off-season, on 30 June 2013, Frolík was traded to the Winnipeg Jets in exchange for a third- and fifth-round pick at the 2013 NHL entry draft. In the 2013–14 season opener on 2 October 2013, at Rexall Place against the Edmonton Oilers, Frolík scored twice in a 5–4 Winnipeg win.

On 29 July 2014, Frolík and the Jets agreed on a one-year, $3.3 million contract. He finished with 19 goals and 23 assists on in the regular season, but was held pointless during the Jets' four-game sweep at the hands of the Anaheim Ducks in the 2015 playoffs.

==== Calgary Flames ====
On 1 July 2015, Frolík, as an unrestricted free agent, signed a five-year, $21 million contract with the Calgary Flames at an annual average value of $4.3 million.

==== Buffalo Sabres ====
During his final year under contract with the Flames in the 2019–20 season, unable to replicate his offensive production from previous years with 10 points through 38 games, Frolik was traded by the Flames to the Buffalo Sabres in exchange for a fourth-round pick in 2020 on 2 January 2020.

==== Montreal Canadiens ====
On 23 December 2020, Frolík signed as a free agent to a one-year, $750,000 contract with the Montreal Canadiens.

==== St. Louis Blues ====
As a free agent over the summer and approaching the 2021–22 season, Frolík accepted an invitation to attend the St. Louis Blues training camp on a professional tryout (PTO) contract on 18 September 2021.

==== Lausanne HC ====
On 15 October 2021, Frolík joined Lausanne HC of the National League (NL) on a two-year deal through the 2022–23 season.

==== Bílí Tygři Liberec ====
Despite having tenure remaining on his deal with Lausanne, Frolík opted to sign with Bílí Tygři Liberec of the Czech Extraliga on 21 July 2022.

==== Rytíři Kladno ====
In July 2023, Frolík agreed to a one-year contract to return to Rabat Kladno (now known as Rytíři Kladno), the team he began his hockey career with in Czech Extraliga seventeen years prior.

== Personal life ==
His wife is former Miss Czech Republic model and TV/radio personality, Diana Kobzanová. They have three daughters together: Ella (b. 2014), Lily (b. 2018) and Nelly (b. 2023).

== Career statistics ==
=== Regular season and playoffs ===
| | | | Regular season | | | | | Playoffs |
| Season | Team | League | GP | G | A | Pts | PIM | GP | G | A | Pts | PIM |
|---|---|---|---|---|---|---|---|---|---|---|---|---|
| 2003–04 | HC Rabat Kladno | CZE U20 | 53 | 21 | 23 | 44 | 22 | 7 | 3 | 1 | 4 | 6 |
| 2004–05 | HC Rabat Kladno | CZE U20 | 15 | 9 | 11 | 20 | 18 | 5 | 1 | 0 | 1 | 10 |
| 2004–05 | HC Rabat Kladno | ELH | 27 | 3 | 1 | 4 | 6 | 1 | 0 | 0 | 0 | 0 |
| 2005–06 | HC Rabat Kladno | CZE U20 | 3 | 1 | 2 | 3 | 0 | 6 | 3 | 9 | 12 | 6 |
| 2005–06 | HC Rabat Kladno | ELH | 48 | 2 | 7 | 9 | 32 | — | — | — | — | — |
| 2006–07 | Rimouski Océanic | QMJHL | 52 | 31 | 42 | 73 | 40 | — | — | — | — | — |
| 2007–08 | Rimouski Océanic | QMJHL | 45 | 24 | 41 | 65 | 22 | 9 | 2 | 4 | 6 | 12 |
| 2008–09 | Florida Panthers | NHL | 79 | 21 | 24 | 45 | 22 | — | — | — | — | — |
| 2009–10 | Florida Panthers | NHL | 82 | 21 | 22 | 43 | 43 | — | — | — | — | — |
| 2010–11 | Florida Panthers | NHL | 52 | 8 | 21 | 29 | 16 | — | — | — | — | — |
| 2010–11 | Chicago Blackhawks | NHL | 28 | 3 | 6 | 9 | 14 | 7 | 2 | 3 | 5 | 2 |
| 2011–12 | Chicago Blackhawks | NHL | 63 | 5 | 10 | 15 | 22 | 4 | 2 | 1 | 3 | 0 |
| 2012–13 | Piráti Chomutov | ELH | 32 | 14 | 10 | 24 | 22 | — | — | — | — | — |
| 2012–13 | Chicago Blackhawks | NHL | 45 | 3 | 7 | 10 | 8 | 23 | 3 | 7 | 10 | 6 |
| 2013–14 | Winnipeg Jets | NHL | 81 | 15 | 27 | 42 | 12 | — | — | — | — | — |
| 2014–15 | Winnipeg Jets | NHL | 82 | 19 | 23 | 42 | 18 | 4 | 0 | 0 | 0 | 2 |
| 2015–16 | Calgary Flames | NHL | 64 | 15 | 17 | 32 | 24 | — | — | — | — | — |
| 2016–17 | Calgary Flames | NHL | 82 | 17 | 27 | 44 | 58 | 4 | 0 | 1 | 1 | 0 |
| 2017–18 | Calgary Flames | NHL | 70 | 10 | 15 | 25 | 26 | — | — | — | — | — |
| 2018–19 | Calgary Flames | NHL | 65 | 16 | 18 | 34 | 26 | 5 | 0 | 0 | 0 | 2 |
| 2019–20 | Calgary Flames | NHL | 38 | 5 | 5 | 10 | 24 | — | — | — | — | — |
| 2019–20 | Buffalo Sabres | NHL | 19 | 1 | 3 | 4 | 4 | — | — | — | — | — |
| 2020–21 | Laval Rocket | AHL | 2 | 0 | 0 | 0 | 4 | — | — | — | — | — |
| 2020–21 | Montreal Canadiens | NHL | 8 | 0 | 0 | 0 | 0 | — | — | — | — | — |
| 2021–22 | Lausanne HC | NL | 23 | 7 | 7 | 14 | 25 | — | — | — | — | — |
| 2022–23 | Bílí Tygři Liberec | ELH | 48 | 10 | 14 | 24 | 28 | 9 | 2 | 1 | 3 | 8 |
| 2023–24 | Rytíři Kladno | ELH | 34 | 2 | 3 | 5 | 33 | — | — | — | — | — |
| ELH totals | | | 189 | 31 | 35 | 66 | 121 | 10 | 2 | 1 | 3 | 8 |
| NHL totals | | | 858 | 159 | 225 | 384 | 317 | 47 | 7 | 12 | 19 | 12 |
| NL totals | | | 23 | 7 | 7 | 14 | 25 | — | — | — | — | — |

=== International ===
Medal record

Representing Czech Republic

Ice hockey

World Championships
| Bronze medal – third place | 2011 Slovakia | |
| Bronze medal – third place | 2012 Finland | |

World Junior Championships
| Bronze medal – third place | 2005 North Dakota | |

IIHF U18 Championships
| Bronze medal – third place | 2004 Minsk | |
| Bronze medal – third place | 2006 Halmstad | |

| Year | Team | Event | Result | GP | G | A | Pts | PIM |
|---|---|---|---|---|---|---|---|---|
| 2004 | Czech Republic | WJC18 | 3rd place, bronze medalist(s) | 2 | 0 | 0 | 0 | 0 |
| 2005 | Czech Republic | WJC | 3rd place, bronze medalist(s) | 7 | 3 | 1 | 4 | 0 |
| 2005 | Czech Republic | WJC18 | 4th | 7 | 3 | 1 | 4 | 2 |
| 2006 | Czech Republic | WJC | 6th | 6 | 0 | 1 | 1 | 4 |
| 2006 | Czech Republic | WJC18 | 3rd place, bronze medalist(s) | 7 | 2 | 3 | 5 | 10 |
| 2007 | Czech Republic | WJC | 5th | 6 | 4 | 2 | 6 | 4 |
| 2008 | Czech Republic | WJC | 5th | 6 | 5 | 0 | 5 | 14 |
| 2011 | Czech Republic | WC | 3rd place, bronze medalist(s) | 9 | 3 | 2 | 5 | 0 |
| 2012 | Czech Republic | WC | 3rd place, bronze medalist(s) | 10 | 2 | 1 | 3 | 0 |
| 2014 | Czech Republic | OG | 6th | 5 | 0 | 0 | 0 | 0 |
| 2016 | Czech Republic | WCH | 6th | 3 | 0 | 1 | 1 | 0 |
| 2022 | Czech Republic | OG | 9th | 2 | 0 | 0 | 0 | 0 |
| Junior totals | | | | 41 | 17 | 8 | 25 | 34 |
| Senior totals | | | | 29 | 5 | 4 | 9 | 0 |

Awards and achievements
| Preceded by Kenndal McArdle | Florida Panthers first-round draft pick 2006 | Succeeded by Keaton Ellerby |
