= Buly Arena Kravaře =

Ice hockey arena in Kravaře, Czech Republic

Buly Arena
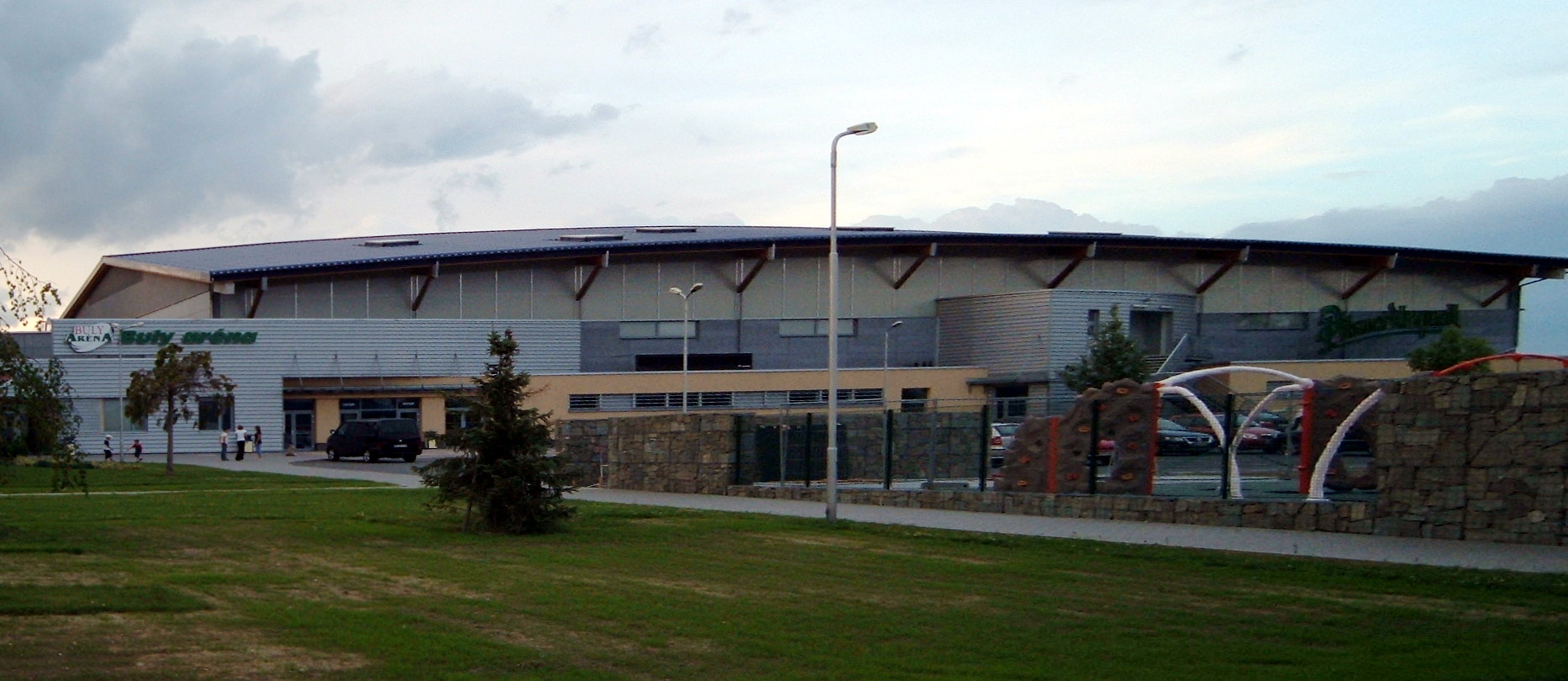
- Interactive map of Buly Arena
- Location: Kostelní 360/28, Kravaře, Czech Republic, 747 21
- Coordinates: 49°55′59.419″N 18°1′41.548″E
- Capacity: 640
- Field size: 28 m × 59 m (92 ft × 194 ft)

Construction
- Opened: 2003

Buly Arena is a sports complex in Kravaře in the Czech Republic. It contains an ice hockey arena, which was opened in 2003. It was built for the training of teams, including the Czech national ice hockey team. The first club team to have a training camp at the arena was CSKA Moscow, in 2006. During the 2015 IIHF World Championship, the complex was used as a base camp by the Russia national team.

The complex also offers a relaxation centre, a tennis hall, outdoor tennis courts and a football pitch.
