= Alois Hadamczik =

Czech ice hockey coach (born 1952)

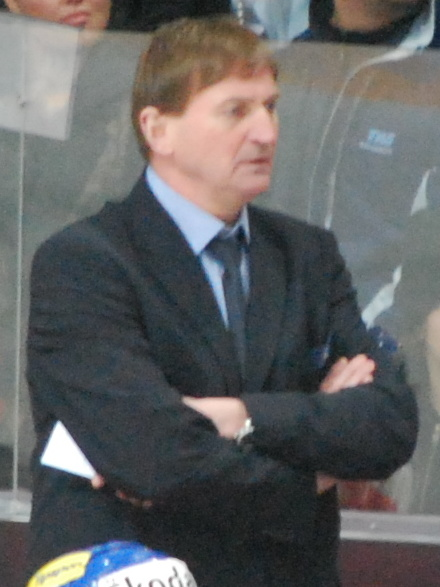
- Born: June 20, 1952 (age 73); Kravaře, Czechoslovakia
- Occupation: Ice hockey coach

Alois Hadamczik
Medal record

Olympic Games
Bronze medal – third place	2006 Turin	Team

World Championships
Silver medal – second place	2006 Riga	Ice hockey
Bronze medal – third place	2011 Bratislava	Ice hockey
Bronze medal – third place	2012 Helsinki	Ice hockey

Alois Hadamczik (born June 20, 1952) is a Czech ice hockey coach. He has been elected as a new president of Czech Ice Hockey Association in June 2022. He is the former head coach of Czech national team. His brother Evžen was a successful football manager and his nephew Pavel Hadamczik is a Czech football coach.

== Playing career ==
Hadamczik had an unremarkable playing career, his highest playing league was in the second division.

== Coach career ==
For clubs, Alois Hadamczik coached for Sparta Praha, Vítkovice, Třinec, Olomouc, Füssen (in Germany) and Sonthofen (also in Germany). Now, he is a Head coach of the Kometa Brno.

For international, Alois Hadamczik became head coach of Czech junior team in 2003, with which he won bronze medal in the 2005 World Junior Championships. He became head coach of the national "A" team in 2006, and this team won bronze medal during the 2006 Olympics. He was also coach during the 2007 and 2008 World Championships.
