= Miss Europe 1995 =

International beauty pageant

- Date: October 23, 1995
- Venue: Istanbul, Turkey
- Entrants: 36
- Placements: 12
- Debuts: Belarus
- Returns: Switzerland; Wales
- Winner: Monika Žídková; Czech Republic

Miss Europe 1995 was the 50th edition of the Miss Europe pageant and the 39th edition under the Mondial Events Organization. It was held in Istanbul, Turkey on October 23, 1995. Monika Žídková of the Czech Republic was crowned Miss Europe 1995 by outgoing titleholder Lilach Ben-Simon of Israel.

Following her win, Žídková became a successful businesswoman, launched her own cosmetic line (Miss Cosmetic), and later entered politics, serving as the mayor of her hometown, Kravaře. She is often cited as one of the most successful and beloved beauty queens in Czech history. Her victory in 1995 was a massive point of national pride, as she was the first woman from the newly formed Czech Republic (following the dissolution of Czechoslovakia) to win the title.

== Results ==
=== Placements ===
Placement	Contestant
Miss Europe 1995	Czech Republic – Monika Žídková
1st Runner-Up	Norway – Ingeborg Dossland
2nd Runner-Up	Sweden – Sofie Tocklin
3rd Runner-Up	Albania – Monika Zguro
4th Runner-Up	Russia – Ilmira Shamsutdinova
Top 12	Germany – Ilka Endres; England – Angie Bowness; Greece – Johanna Mavredaki; Iceland – Hrafnhildur Hafsteinsdóttir; Israel – Yana Kalman; Switzerland – Veronique Kreen; Turkey – Beste Açar

== Contestants ==
- Albania – Monika Zguro
- Austria – Cornalia Hatzl
- Belarus – Natalia Makei
- Belgium – Vanessa Minique
- Bulgaria – Guergana Karadjova
- Czech Republic – Monika Žídková
- Denmark – Mille Sandgren
- England – Angie Bowness
- Estonia – Kadri Kont-Kontson
- Finland – Miia Puoskari
- France – Sophie Bourger
- Germany – Ilka Endres
- Greece – Johanna Mavredaki
- Holland – Kaysa de Haan
- Hungary – Krisztina Dallos
- Iceland – Hrafnhildur Hafsteinsdóttir
- Ireland – Anna Maria McCarthy
- Israel – Yana Kalman
- Italy – Barbara Cioni
- Latvia – Ilze Širiņa
- Lithuania – Danguolė Leskevičiūtė
- Luxembourg – Paola Roberto
- Malta – Janet Gould
- Norway – Ingeborg Dossland
- Poland – Magdalena Pęcikiewicz
- Portugal – Adriana Iria
- Romania – Irena Aldea
- Russia – Ilmira Shamsutdinova
- Scotland – Tracy West
- Slovak Republic – Jana Budovičová
- Spain – Ana Martínez Conde
- Sweden – Sofie Tocklin
- Switzerland – Veronique Kreen
- Turkey – Beste Açar
- Ukraine – Vlada Litovchenko
- Wales – Liza Warner

== Notes ==
=== Debuts ===
- Belarus

=== Returns ===
- Switzerland
- Wales
