= Arzum Onan =

Turkish actress and model

- Born: 31 October 1973 (age 52); Ankara, Turkey
- Occupations: Actress, Model
- Years active: 1997–2010
- Spouse: Mehmet Aslantuğ (m. 1996; div. 2023)
- Children: 1

Arzum Onan (born 31 October 1973) is a Turkish actress, former model and beauty pageant titleholder who was crowned Miss Europe 1993. She is best known for "Sahra" and hit crime series "Sıcak Saatler" alongside ex-husband Mehmet Aslantuğ.

== Biography ==
She was born on 31 October 1973, in Ankara, Turkey. Her family is of Circassian descent. After the primary school in Ankara, her family moved to Istanbul, where she finished the vocational high school as a draftswoman.

Arzum began her career in 1992 as a model. She participated in the Miss Turkey contest in April 1993, and won the title. The same year in July, she represented her country at the Miss Europe beauty contest held in Istanbul, and was crowned Miss Europe 1993. She became the fifth Turkish beauty queen following Günseli Başar, Filiz Vural, Nazlı Deniz Kuruoğlu and Neşe Erberk.

Since 1997, she successfully played in a number of films, mini television series and commercials.

In 1996, Arzum married the actor Mehmet Aslantuğ, from whom she has a son, Can, born in 2000. In 2005, she underwent a thyroid surgery.

== Filmography ==
- Yeni Bir Yıldız (1997)
- Aşkın İkinci Yarısı (2009)

=== Series ===
- Sıcak Saatler (1998)
- Aşk ve Hüzün (2000)
- Merdoğlu (2000)
- Zeybek Ateşi (2002)
- Sahra (2004)
- Sessiz Fırtına (2007)
- Kardelen (2008)

Awards
Preceded by Özlem Kaymaz	Miss Turkey; 1993	Succeeded by Pınar Altuğ
Preceded by (Greece) Marina Tsintikidou	Miss Europe; 1993	Succeeded by (Israel) Lilach Ben-Simon
