= Monika Brzesková =

Czech politician (born 1977)

Member of the Chamber of Deputies
- Incumbent
- Assumed office 4 October 2025
- Constituency: Moravian-Silesian Region

Mayor of Kravaře
- Incumbent
- Assumed office 12 November 2014
- Preceded by: Andreas Hahn

Personal details
- Born: Monika Žídková; 11 June 1977 (age 49) Kravaře, Czechoslovakia
- Party: KDU-ČSL
- Education: University of Ostrava

Monika Brzesková (née Žídková; born 11 June 1977) is a Czech politician and beauty pageant titleholder. She is serving as a member of the Chamber of Deputies since 2025. She has served as mayor of Kravaře since 2014. In 1995, she was crowned Miss České republiky and Miss Europe.

She was born in Kravaře and still lives there. She graduated from the Faculty of Education of the University of Ostrava, where she studied teaching on lower grades of the primary schools. She married in 1999 and has two children.
