= Jana Doleželová =

Czech model and pharmacist

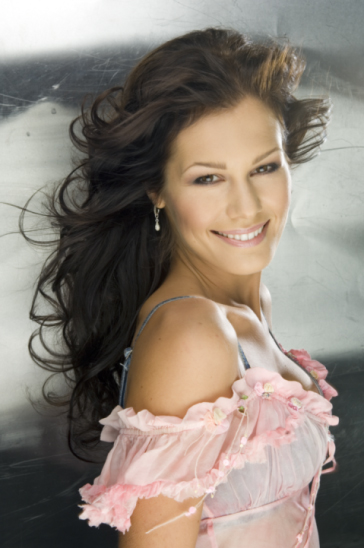
- Born: Jana Doleželová; 23 June 1981 (age 45); Šternberk, Czechoslovakia
- Height: 1.76 m (5 ft 9 1/2 in)
- Children: 1
- Beauty pageant titleholder
- Title: Miss Czech Republic 2004
- Hair color: Brown
- Eye color: Brown
- Major competitions: Miss Czech Republic 2004 (Winner); Miss World 2004 (Top 15)

Jana Doleželová (born 23 June 1981 in Šternberk, Czechoslovakia) is a Czech actress, model, pharmacist and beauty pageant titleholder who won Miss Czech Republic 2004 and was a semi-finalist in Miss World 2004 in China. She gave birth to a daughter with her ex-partner David Trunda in 2017.

Preceded by Lucie Váchová	Miss Czech Republic; 2004	Succeeded by Lucie Králová
