= Evžen Hadamczik =

Czech footballer and manager

Personal information
- Date of birth: 28 October 1939
- Place of birth: Deutsch Krawarn, Nazi Germany
- Date of death: 19 September 1984 (aged 44)
- Place of death: Ostrava, Czechoslovakia
- Position: Forward

Youth career
- Spartak Dolní Benešov
- Sokol Kravaře

Senior career*
Years	Team	Apps	(Gls)
- Dukla Cheb

Managerial career
- 1963–1970: Spartak Dolní Benešov
- 1970–1977: Ostroj Opava
- 1978–1983: Baník Ostrava
- 1982–1984: Czechoslovakia Olympic team
- 1984: Czechoslovakia
- * Club domestic league appearances and goals

Evžen Hadamczik (28 October 1939 – 19 September 1984) was a Czech football manager and former player. He was responsible for the Golden Era of Baník Ostrava football club, winning the Czechoslovak First League in 1980 and 1981 with them. He is perceived as the legendary manager of the club.

As a young footballer, Hadamczik was injured in one of the matches, and was forced to end his active career at the age of 22. Because of that, he began his coaching career at very young age. He coached Spartak Dolní Benešov and Ostroj Opava prior to joining Baník Ostrava on 1 January 1978. During five years at Baník, Hadamczik modernized and transformed the team, which became one of the strongest in Czechoslovakia. Under his leadership, Baník won the Czechoslovak First League in 1980 and 1981 and thrice finished as runner-up. In the 1977/1978 season, the team won the Czechoslovak Cup. In this era Baník did not lose 74 home matches in a row, thus being almost five years undefeated at their home ground.

From 1982 to 1984, Hadamczik coached the Czechoslovak Olympic team. However, his long preparations with the Olympic team were wasted, as the communist authorities forbade Czechoslovak sportspeople to compete at the 1984 Summer Olympics in Los Angeles. He also led the Czechoslovakia national team on 23 August 1984 in a match against East Germany in Erfurt.

Extensive neural load and work stress, as well as his illness, led to his death. On 19 September 1984 Evžen Hadamczik hanged himself in his garage in Ostrava. He is buried at the cemetery in his native Kravaře. Each year a memorial football tournament for youth, bearing his name, is played in Ostrava.

He was a brother of ice hockey coach Alois Hadamczik.
