= Filiz Vural =

Turkish beauty contestant (born 1953)

Filiz Vural (born 1953) is a former Turkish beauty contestant and Miss Europe 1971.

She participated at a beauty pageant organized by the newspaper Hürriyet, and won the title Miss Turkey 1970. The next year, she represented her country at the Miss Europe beauty contest held in Tunis, Tunisia, and was crowned Miss Europe on September 18, 1971.

She married Engin Çağlar, a former film actor, in 1972.

Awards
Preceded by (Spain) Noelia Alfonso Cabrera	Miss Europe; 1971	Succeeded by (Germany) Monika Sarp
