= Miss Europe 1993 =

International beauty pageant

- Date: July 12, 1993
- Venue: Istanbul, Turkey
- Entrants: 31
- Placements: 12
- Debuts: Czech Republic; Slovakia; Ukraine
- Withdrawals: Belgium; Cyprus; Czechoslovakia; Hungary; Wales
- Returns: Denmark
- Winner: Arzum Onan; Turkey

Miss Europe 1993 was the 48th edition of the Miss Europe pageant and the 37th edition under the Mondial Events Organization. It was held in Istanbul, Turkey on July 12, 1993. Arzum Onan of Turkey was crowned Miss Europe 1993 by outgoing titleholder Marina Tsintikidou of Greece.

== Results ==
=== Placements ===
Placement	Contestant	Ref.
Miss Europe 1993	Turkey – Arzum Onan	
1st Runner-Up	Russia – Yuliya Alekseyeva	
2nd Runner-Up	Israel – Dana Avrish	
3rd Runner-Up	Spain – Ana Maria Pérez	
4th Runner-Up	Iceland – Svala Björk Arnardóttir	
Top 12	Bulgaria – Gergana Fidanova; England – Alison Hobson; Finland – Emilia Söderman; Greece – Afrodite Kouli; Holland – Esther de Jong; Luxembourg – Nathalie Dos Santos; Portugal – Marisa Cruz	

== Contestants ==
- Albania – Sidorela Kola
- Austria – Nelly Schperin (Sperl?)
- Bulgaria – Gergana Fidanova
- Czech Republic – Jana Rybská
- Denmark – Mette Marie Salto
- England – Alison Hobson
- Estonia – Teini Vaher
- Finland – Emilia Söderman
- France – Véronique de la Cruz
- Germany – Verona Feldbusch
- Greece – Afrodite Kouli
- Holland – Esther de Jong
- Iceland – Svala Björk Arnardóttir
- Ireland – UNKNOWN
- Israel – Dana Avrish
- Italy – Marika Coco
- Lithuania – Vilmantė Nainytė
- Luxembourg – Nathalie Dos Santos
- Malta – Romina Genuis
- Norway – Julianne Skovli
- Poland – Dorota Wróbel
- Portugal – Marisa Cruz
- Romania – Adriana Silaci
- Russia – Yuliya Alekseyeva
- Scotland – Laura King
- Slovak Republic – Silvia Lakatošová
- Spain – Ana Maria Pérez Ayllón
- Sweden – Christina Gustavsson (Christina Gustafsson)
- Switzerland – Béatrice Keul
- Turkey – Arzum Onan
- Ukraine – Veronika Ordynskaya

== Notes ==
=== Withdrawals ===
- Belgium – Stéphanie Meire
- Cyprus
- Czechoslovakia – Split into the Czech Republic and the Slovak Republic in 1993, thus withdrew and stop competing in the pageant.
- Hungary – Bernadett Papp
- Wales – Natalie Lee

=== Debuts/Returns ===
- Czech Republic – Was represented in the pageant as Czechoslovakia in prior editions. This is the first time the Czech Republic is competing as its own country.
- Slovak Republic – Was represented in the pageant as Czechoslovakia in prior editions. This is the first time the Slovak Republic is competing as its own country.
- Ukraine – Was represented in the pageant as Russia/USSR back in 1929 and the 1930s.

=== Returns ===
- Denmark
