= Diana Kobzanová =

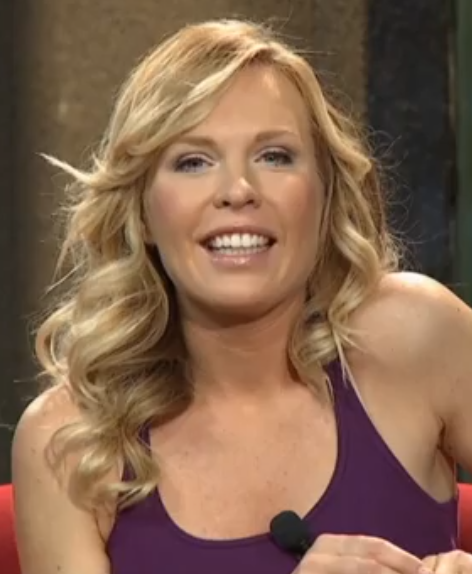
- On Show Jana Krause in 2014
- Born: 24 March 1982 (age 44); Neuburg an der Donau, West Germany
- Height: 1.80 m (5 ft 11 in)
- Partner: Michael Frolík
- Children: 3
- Beauty pageant titleholder
- Title: Miss Czech Republic 2001
- Hair color: Blond
- Eye color: Blue
- Major competition: Miss Universe 2002 (Unplaced)

Diana Kobzanová (born 24 March 1982 in Neuburg an der Donau, West Germany) is a Czech TV host and beauty pageant titleholder who won Miss Czech Republic 2002 as a 19-year-old and represented her country in Miss Universe 2002 in Puerto Rico.

== Career ==
Nowadays is Kobzanová more Czech television and radio presenter than a model. She has hosted Czech version of reality show Való Világ on TV Prima, her own show Drzá Diana and talk show In-box on TV Óčko. She also hosted reality show about home decor Vrabci v hrsti and show Horký prachy. At radio Frekvence 1 she presented programmes Na titulní straně, Styl and Sportbar. She was on air for more than 8 years.

== Personal life ==
Kobzanová was four years in a relationship with footballer Martin Jiránek. Then with businessman Tomáš Petera and rally driver Štěpán Vojtěch for more than three years. As of 2013, Kobzanová is in a relationship with ice hockey player Michael Frolík.

In December 2014 she gave birth to a daughter Ella. In April 2018, she and her partner Michael Frolík welcomed their second daughter Lily. In March 2023 she gave birth to their third daughter Nelly.

== Controversy ==
Few months after her victory she posed for Czech pornographic magazine LEO for 5 million Czech crowns, the equivalent of around 207,320 US dollars. As a result, she lost her title and faced a lawsuit by chairman Miloslav Zapletal who claimed she had damaged the competition's good name. After 4 years of lawsuit, she won and didn't need to apologize publicly or pay a penalty.

Preceded by Michaela Salačová	Miss Czech Republic; 2001	Succeeded by Kateřina Průšová
