= Aneta Vignerová =

Czech model

- Born: 27 October 1987 (age 38); Havířov, Czechoslovakia
- Height: 1.80 m (5 ft 11 in)
- Spouse: Petr Kolečko (m. 2023)
- Beauty pageant titleholder
- Title: Miss Czech Republic 2009
- Hair color: Brown
- Eye color: Brown
- Major competition: Miss World 2009 (Unplaced)

Aneta Vignerová (born 27 October 1987) is a Czech model and beauty pageant titleholder who won Miss Czech Republic 2009 and represented her country at Miss World 2009 in Johannesburg.

== Personal life ==
She was two years in a relationship with Czech retired footballer Tomáš Ujfaluši, then with Ice hockey player Michal Gulaši. Vignerová was in relationship with another footballer Michal Zeman.

On 14 March 2023, Vignerová married screenwriter Petr Kolečko, with whom she had a son in 2020.

Preceded by Zuzana Jandová	Miss Czech Republic; 2009	Succeeded by Kateřina Kasanová
