= Kateřina Sokolová =

Czech model and beauty pageant contestant

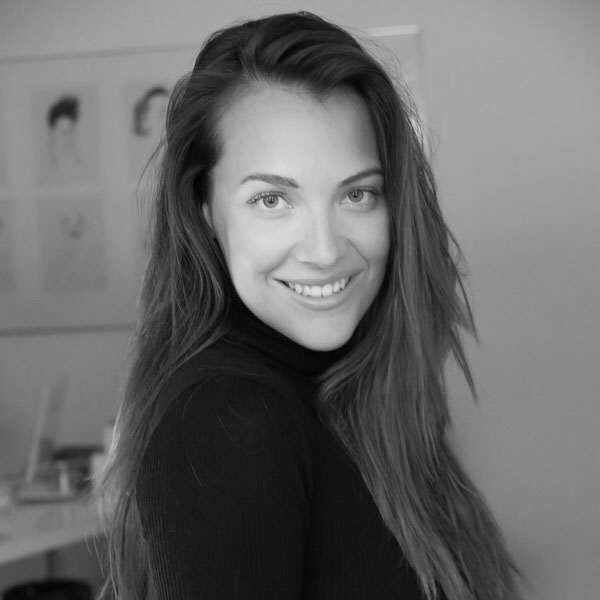
- Kateřina during Miss World 2007
- Born: Kateřina Sokolova; 4 April 1989 (age 37); Přerov, Czechoslovakia
- Height: 1.77 m (5 ft 10 in)
- Beauty pageant titleholder
- Title: Miss Czech Republic 2007
- Major competition: Miss World 2007 (Unplaced)

Kateřina Sokolová is a Czech fashion model and beauty pageant titleholder who won Miss Czech Republic 2007 who took over the crown of royal beauty on 14 April 2007 after Taťána Kuchařová. During the gala evening, she received the title of Miss Silhouette and Miss Bohemia. In 2007 she participated in the Miss World 2007 in China.

== Early life and career ==
She started modeling at the age of 14 in her hometown Přerov, then she continued with modeling in Prague. She has worked as a model internationally.

Kateřina Sokolová played one of the main roles in the Czech Chinese series Last Visa by TwinStar film. She appeared in the Chinese talk show Day Day Up. She has also appeared in Czech talk shows.

In May 2008, she graduated from the Modřany Classical Grammar School. In 2014, she graduated with a degree in economics at the University of Business in Prague in the field of Tourism Management.

== Philanthropy ==
In 2015, Kateřina Sokolová together with her father Jan Sokol founded the AutTalk Foundation based on family experience. The aim of the fund is to support families caring for autism, the fund also focuses on educating the topic of autism and supporting organizations working in the field of autism.

In 2021, Kateřina Sokolová received the Youth Heroes Award from IAYSP Czech for her work in the field of philanthropy.

== Personal life ==
On 3 June 2024 Sokolová announced the birth of a daughter with her boyfriend, billionaire businessman Martin Wichterle, who was 23 years older than her.

Preceded by Taťána Kuchařová	Miss Czech Republic; 2007	Succeeded by Zuzana Jandová
