= Karl Albert Scherner =

Karl Albert Scherner (26 July 1825 – 6 June 1889) was a German philosopher and psychologist.

== Life ==
Karl Albert Scherner was born on 26 July 1825 in Deutsch-Krawarn, a village on the then border between Prussian Silesia and Austrian Silesia (now the border between Poland and the Czech Republic), near the district capital of Ratibor (Racibórz). He studied at the Gymnasium in Ratibor and in May 1846 went up to the university in Breslau (Wrocław), where he studied Catholic theology. In 1858 he became a Docent in the Philosophy Department of the same university, a position which he held until the winter term of 1871–72. He is said to have given up his university career because of a severe throat condition. Subsequently, he filled an administrative post at a boys school in Breslau. In 1865, he married Marie Schwinger, who worked at the same school. Scherner died on 6 June 1889 in Breslau, having suffered a stroke in 1887.

== Works ==
As a philosopher, Scherner was principally interested in the nature of the human soul. The first course he taught at Breslau was called “Das Wesen und Leben der Seelensubstanz vom Standpunkte des spekulativen Forschers” (The nature and life of the soul-substance from the standpoint of the speculative researcher) (1858–59), followed the next year by “Psychologie oder Beschreibung der Menschenseele nach ihrer allgemeinen Natur und ihren besonderen Vermögen und Kräften mit durchgängiger Berücksichtigung der leiblichen Seite” (The psychology or description of the human soul according to its general nature and its special attributes and powers with continual reference to the physical side) (1859–60). In 1860–61, he taught two courses on “Politik oder über den Organismus des Staatskörpers” (Politics or on the organism of the state body) and “Über den Charakter Friedrichs des Großen” (On the character of Frederick the Great). Between 1861 and 1867 his courses included “Originalforschungen über die Seele des Weibes” (Original research on the soul of woman), “Über die psychologischen Schätze der Sprichwörter” (On the psychological treasury of proverbs), Psychologie”, “Metaphysik der Seele” (Metaphysics of the soul), “Psychologische Erklärung von Shakespeares König Lear” (Psychological interpretation of Shakespeare's King Lear) and “Psychologische Erklärung der Shakespearischen Tragödie Hamlet” (Psychological interpretation of the Shakespearian tragedy Hamlet).

=== The Life of the Dream ===
Scherner's most important work — indeed, his only published book, apart from a collection of travel articles about the Tatra Mountains — is Das Leben des Traums (The Life of the Dream). According to Scherner, the work of the dream-imagination is artistic and non-utilitarian, and its material is organic somatic stimuli that are otherwise obscured during waking life. The manner in which the dream-imagination represents the organism as a whole is chiefly as a house. The various parts of the house stand for different portions or organs of the body; for example, in a dream caused by a headache, the head might be represented as a ceiling covered with spiders, and in dreams "with a dental stimulus" the oral cavity might be represented by an entrance-hall with a vaulted roof. Scherner's original contribution to psychology, which was to be recognised by Sigmund Freud, was his recognition that the means whereby the imagination represents stimuli in dreams is symbolic.

== Freud and Scherner ==
Between 1899 and 1916, Freud cited Scherner's theories on dreams more than twenty times in his writings, particularly in The Interpretation of Dreams (1900), where, in a footnote added in 1911, he acknowledges Scherner as “true discoverer of symbolism in dreams." In his library Freud had two copies of Scherner's Das Leben des Traums, both of which are heavily underlined, particularly passages dealing with sexual dreams. Nevertheless, Freud is critical of Scherner's Das Leben des Traums, which he says is "written in a turgid and high-flown style and is inspired by an almost intoxicated enthusiasm for his subject which is bound to repel anyone who cannot share in his fervour. It puts such difficulties in the way of an analysis of its contents that we turn with relief to the clearer and briefer exposition of Scherner's doctrines given by the philosopher Volkelt. 'Suggestive gleams of meaning proceed like lightning-flashes out of these mystical agglomerations, these clouds of glory and splendour — but they do not illuminate a philosopher's path.' It is in these terms that Scherner's writings are judged even by his disciple."
