= Lucie Váchová =

Czech model (born 1984)

Lucie Křížková
- Born: Lucie Váchová; 4 August 1984 (age 42); Příbram, Czechoslovakia
- Height: 1.78 m (5 ft 10 in)
- Spouse: David Křížek (m. 2009)
- Children: 2
- Beauty pageant titleholder
- Title: Miss Czech Republic 2003
- Hair color: Brown
- Eye color: Brown
- Major competitions: Miss Czech Republic 2003 (Winner); Miss World 2003 (Unplaced)

Lucie Křížková (née Lucie Váchová; born 4 August 1984 in Příbram, Czechoslovakia) is a Czech model and beauty pageants titleholder who won Miss Czech Republic 2003 and represented her country at Miss World 2003 in China.

Preceded by Kateřina Průšová	Miss Czech Republic; 2003	Succeeded by Jana Doleželová
