= Helena Houdová =

Czech model

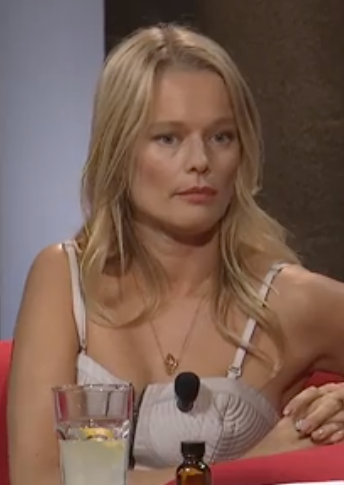
- On Show Jana Krause in 2016
- Born: 27 December 1979 (age 46); Plzeň, Czechoslovakia

Helena Houdová (born 1979) is a Czech model and charity worker and beauty pageant titleholder who won Miss Czech Republic 1999. After winning Miss Czech Republic, she went on to appear on the cover of fashion magazines including Elle, Harper's Bazaar, Cosmopolitan and Vogue. She makes donations to charities for orphans and disadvantaged children, and is the president and founder of Sunflower Children, a charity devoted to these causes, which she founded in 2000.

== Early life ==
Houdová was born and raised in Plzeň, Czechoslovakia (modern-day Czech Republic).

== Modeling career ==
Houdová won the Miss Czech Republic competition in 1999, and went on to compete at Miss World 1999, where she did not place. She later became a fashion model, appearing on runways in New York, Milan, London and Paris. Houdová appeared on the cover the May 2005 edition of Elle, which dedicated the entire issue to her.

Houdová has appeared on the covers of Italian, Japanese, American, French and Spanish Elle, V, Flair, i-D and Time's Style & Design, and featured in advertising campaigns for Gap, Yves Saint Laurent, Victoria's Secret, Emanuel Ungaro, Tommy Hilfiger, Revlon, Dolce & Gabbana, Escada and Louis Vuitton.

In 2005, Houdová was named a Goodwill Ambassador for Maternal, Newborn and Child Health. In 2007, FHM magazine declared that "Houdová is one of the 'Top 100 Most Beautiful Women' in the world - and is one of the most successful models in the competitive fashion model industry."

In 2008, Houdová was featured on four covers, including the Elle Italia and Czech Elle Motherhood Issue. In 2009 Houdová and her newborn son, alongside Pavlína Pořízková and Miloš Forman, appeared in a Louis Vuitton-campaign photographed by Lucie Robinson for the benefit of her Sunflower Children charity foundation.

== Charity work ==
Houdová runs Sunflower Children, a charity for disadvantaged children operating in 15 countries. According to Houdová, the mission of Sunflower Children is to work in different cultures to "move people from indifference to compassion".

== Personal life ==
Houdová has three children with ex-husband Omar Amanat, an American entrepreneur and investor, who was convicted of investor fraud in 2017 and sentenced in August 2021 to five years in federal prison and fined $175,000; the 44 months already served pre-sentencing would be credited toward this sentence.
