= Kateřina Průšová =

Czech model (born 1983)

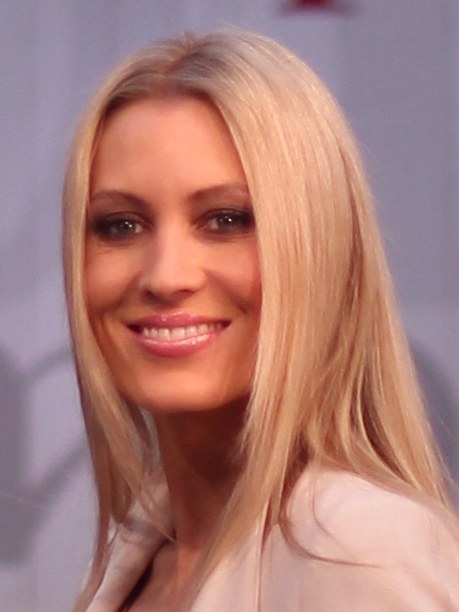
- Born: Kateřina Průšová; 1 December 1983 (age 42); Liberec, Czechoslovakia
- Height: 1.78 m (5 ft 10 in)
- Spouse: Vladimír Konvalinka (m. 2008–2011)
- Beauty pageant titleholder
- Title: Miss Czech Republic 2002
- Hair color: Blond
- Eye color: Blue

Kateřina Průšová (born 1 December 1983 in Liberec) is a Czech model and beauty pageant titleholder who won Miss Czech Republic 2002 as an 18-year-old. She was due to participate at the Miss Universe 2003 pageant, but was replaced by Kateřina Smržová due to Průšová not being able to speak English properly.

While being married to Vladimír Konvalinka (2008 − 2011), she used the double surname, Konvalinka Průšová

Preceded by Diana Kobzanová	Miss Czech Republic; 2002	Succeeded by Lucie Váchová
