= Lucie Robinson =

Czech photographer

Lucie Robinson (born 1978) is a portrait, art and fashion photographer.

Robinson was born in Jablonec nad Nisou in the former Czechoslovakia into a family with roots in Austria, Imperial Russia, and Germany. She studied joaillerie in her hometown and design at the Academy of Arts, Architecture and Design (VSUP) in Prague. In 1996 she launched a career as a commercial model, moving to Paris in 1998.

She had received formal education covering artistic techniques, but concentrated on the medium of photography and by the early 2000s established herself as a portrait and fashion photographer. She photographed many celebrities and top models including a 2009 publicity campaign for Louis Vuitton featuring Paulina Porizkova, Miloš Forman and Helena Houdová. Her portraits and fashion editorials have been published by Vogue Italia, L'Officiel Paris, Elle, Harper's Bazaar, Marie Claire, Vision (China), Wig (UK) and further fashion and lifestyle magazines in Europe and in Asia. However, Robinson’s uncredited work appeared also in commercial advertisement campaigns for industrial clients like Cadbury, Orange Mobile, T-Mobile and Procter & Gamble. Her art photographs commissioned by Marriott International are displayed in over one hundred hotels worldwide.

Her work has won various prizes, including the 2006 Cannes Fashion Photography Festival and three consecutive wins (2007–2009) of the Schwarzkopf Press Awards. In 2008, a solo exhibition of her work on fashion and architecture was staged in the New York Museum of Arts and Design. At The 2018 Art Fair India in New Delhi, her work on "Follow Me" video art reel has been showcased. During the Art Basel Week Miami 2019, her photographs have been presented in a performative installation at the Satellite Art Show.
