= Lucie Šlégrová =

Czech model (born 1982)

- Born: Lucie Králová; 10 February 1982 (age 44); Teplice, Czechoslovakia
- Height: 1.74 m (5 ft 9 in)
- Spouses: Zdeněk Kaufmann (m. 2008–2012); Jiří Šlégr (m. 2015)
- Children: 3
- Beauty pageant titleholder
- Title: Miss Czech Republic 2005
- Hair color: Brown
- Eye color: Gray
- Major competition: Miss World 2005 (Unplaced)

Lucie Šlégrová, née Králová (born 10 February 1982) is a Czech model and beauty pageant titleholder. She won Miss Czech Republic 2005 and represented her country at Miss World 2005 but Unplaced.

== Biography ==
Lucie Králová was born in Teplice in Czechoslovakia. From the age of 10, she was active in theatre and dance, performing in venues throughout the Czech Republic.

== Pageants ==
Králová was named Miss Teen Teplice in 1997, Miss Teplice in 2003 and Miss North Czech in 2004. She was selected to the finals of the Miss Czech Republic 2004 competition, but withdrew due to family issues. The next year, she again competed and was named Miss Czech Republic 2005 at the age of 23. During the national pageant, she was also titled Miss Congeniality, Miss Voice and Miss Talent for her scenic dance performance.

Králová represented the Czech Republic in the Miss World 2005 competition held in China, where she was again named Miss Talent for her dance performance.

== Career ==
On 17 August 2026, Prima televize announced Šlégrová as their new sports presenter at a press conference.

== Personal life ==
In 2008, Králová married Zdeněk Kaufmann at Chateau Štiřín. The couple have two children, Robert and Richard. Králová presently dedicates herself to raising a family, maintaining a healthy lifestyle and contributing to charitable activities. Following the Miss Czech pageant, she established an endowment fund for the benefit of the elderly. In 2012, Králová and Kaufmann were divorced. In May 2015, she married a former ice hockey player, Jiří Šlégr. In May 2020, Šlégrová gave birth to their son Ron.

Preceded by Jana Doleželová	Miss Czech Republic; 2005	Succeeded by Taťána Kuchařová
