= Zuzana Jandová =

Czech businesswoman (born 1987)

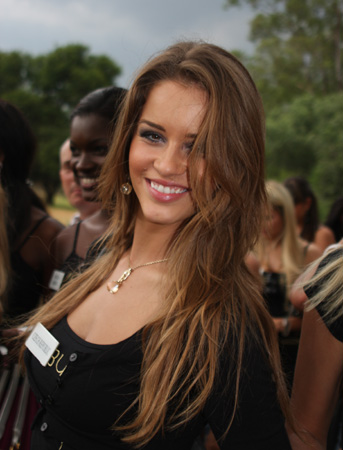
- Born: Zuzana Jandová; 18 August 1987 (age 39); Karviná, Czechoslovakia
- Occupations: Businesswoman, model, charity worker
- Height: 1.80 m (5 ft 11 in)
- Beauty pageant titleholder
- Title: Miss Czech Republic 2008
- Major competition: Miss World 2008 (Unplaced)

Zuzana Jandová (born 18 August 1987 in Karviná, Czechoslovakia) is a Czech businesswoman, model, charity worker and beauty pageant titleholder who won the 2008 Miss Czech Republic and represented her country in Miss World 2008 in South Africa. She completed her studies at a business school and works in Charity Endowment, Help and Support.

Preceded by Kateřina Sokolová	Miss Czech Republic; 2008	Succeeded by Aneta Vignerová
