= Kravaře =

- Town
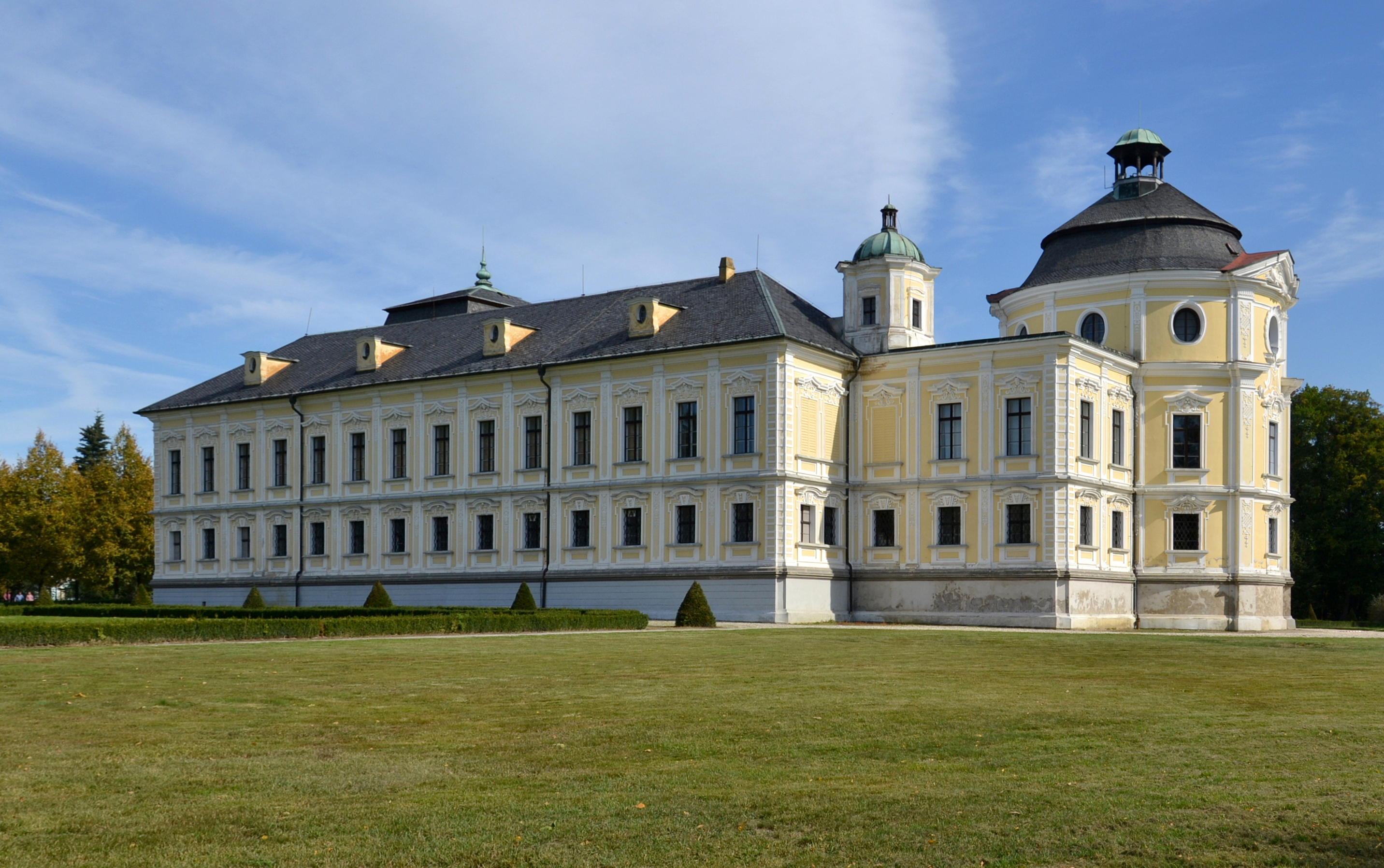
- Kravaře Castle

- Flag Coat of arms

- Location in the Czech Republic
- Coordinates: 49°56′10″N 18°0′37″E
- Country: Czech Republic
- Region: Moravian-Silesian
- District: Opava
- First mentioned: 1224

Government
  - Mayor: Monika Brzesková (KDU-ČSL)

Area
  - Total: 19.37 km^{2} (7.48 sq mi)
- Elevation: 233 m (764 ft)

Population (2026-01-01)
  - Total: 6,691
  - Density: 345.4/km^{2} (894.7/sq mi)
- Time zone: UTC+1 (CET)
  - Summer (DST): UTC+2 (CEST)
- Postal code: 747 21
- Website: www.kravare.cz

Kravaře (Czech pronunciation: [ˈkravar̝ɛ]; German: Deutsch Krawarn) is a town in Opava District the Moravian-Silesian Region of the Czech Republic. It has about 6,700 inhabitants. The town is located on the left bank of the Opava River in the historic Hlučín Region.

Kravaře was founded in the 13th century at the latest, but it became a town only in 1960. Among the main landmarks of Kravaře are the Kravaře Castle and the Church of Saint Bartholomew.

== Administrative division ==
Kravaře consists of three municipal parts (in brackets population according to the 2021 census):

- Kravaře (4,585)
- Dvořisko (322)
- Kouty (1,630)

== Geography ==
Kravaře is located about 6 kilometres (4 mi) east of Opava and 20 km (12 mi) northwest of Ostrava. It lies in the Opava Hilly Land. The town is situated on the left bank of the Opava River.

== History ==
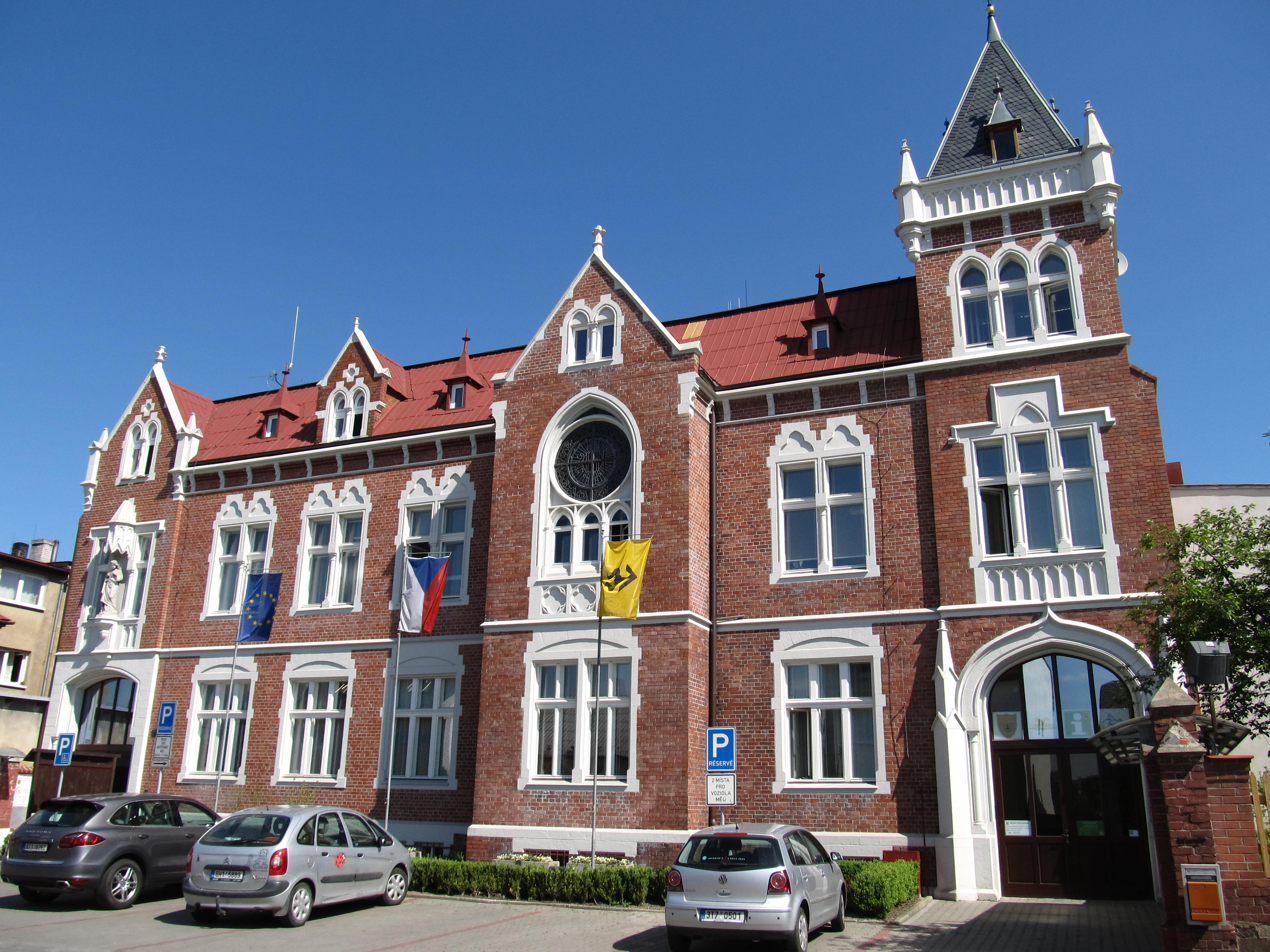
Town hall

The first written mention of Kravaře is from 1224. Kouty was first mentioned in 1238 and Dvořisko in the second half of the 18th century. Between 1224 and 1263, the Kravaře estate was acquired by the lords from Benešov, who were further known as lords of Kravaře. From 13th to 15th century, it was one of the richest families in Moravia. In the second half of the 13th century, they had built a fortress in Kravaře. The last owner of Kravaře from this family was Petr Strážnický, who was forced to sell Kravaře in 1420.

The next important owner of Kravaře was Michael Sendivogius, who received the estate during the Thirty Years' War. After his death in 1636, his daughter married the free lord of Eichendorff. In 1721–1728, Jan Rudolf Eichendorff had rebuilt the fortress into a late Baroque castle. The Eichendorffs had to sell the estate in 1782 due to debts. After that, Kravaře were held by less important owners.

Since 1742, Kravaře and Kouty belonged to Prussia after Maria Theresa had been defeated. Dvořisko, located behind the Opava River, remained in the Austrian Empire. In 1920, the area of Hlučín Region was returned to Czechoslovakia. During World War II, it was annexed by Nazi Germany and administered as part of the Reichsgau Sudetenland.

For centuries, Kravaře was only a village. In 1960, Kouty and Dvořisko were annexed to Kravaře and the new municipality gained the status of a town.

== Demographics ==
Historical population

Year	Pop.	±%
1869	4,527	—
1880	4,609	+1.8%
1890	4,847	+5.2%
1900	5,340	+10.2%
1910	5,475	+2.5%

Year	Pop.	±%
1921	6,199	+13.2%
1930	6,018	−2.9%
1950	5,354	−11.0%
1961	5,989	+11.9%
1970	5,949	−0.7%

Year	Pop.	±%
1980	6,395	+7.5%
1991	6,560	+2.6%
2001	6,693	+2.0%
2011	6,570	−1.8%
2021	6,537	−0.5%

Source: Censuses

== Transport ==
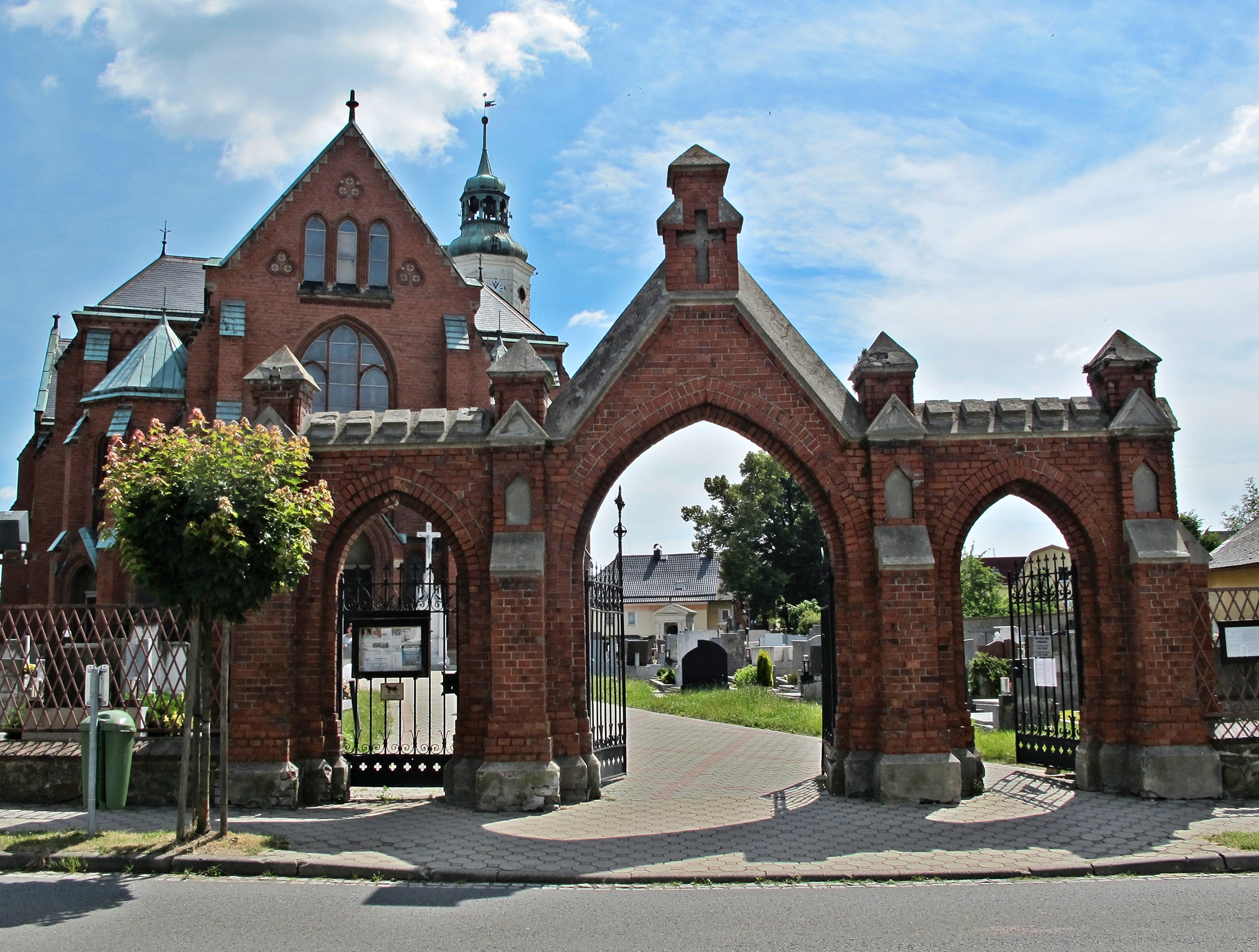
Main gate to the church complex

The I/56 road from Ostrava to Opava passes through the town.

Kravaře is located on the railway lines Opava–Hlučín and Kravaře–Chuchelná.

== Sport ==
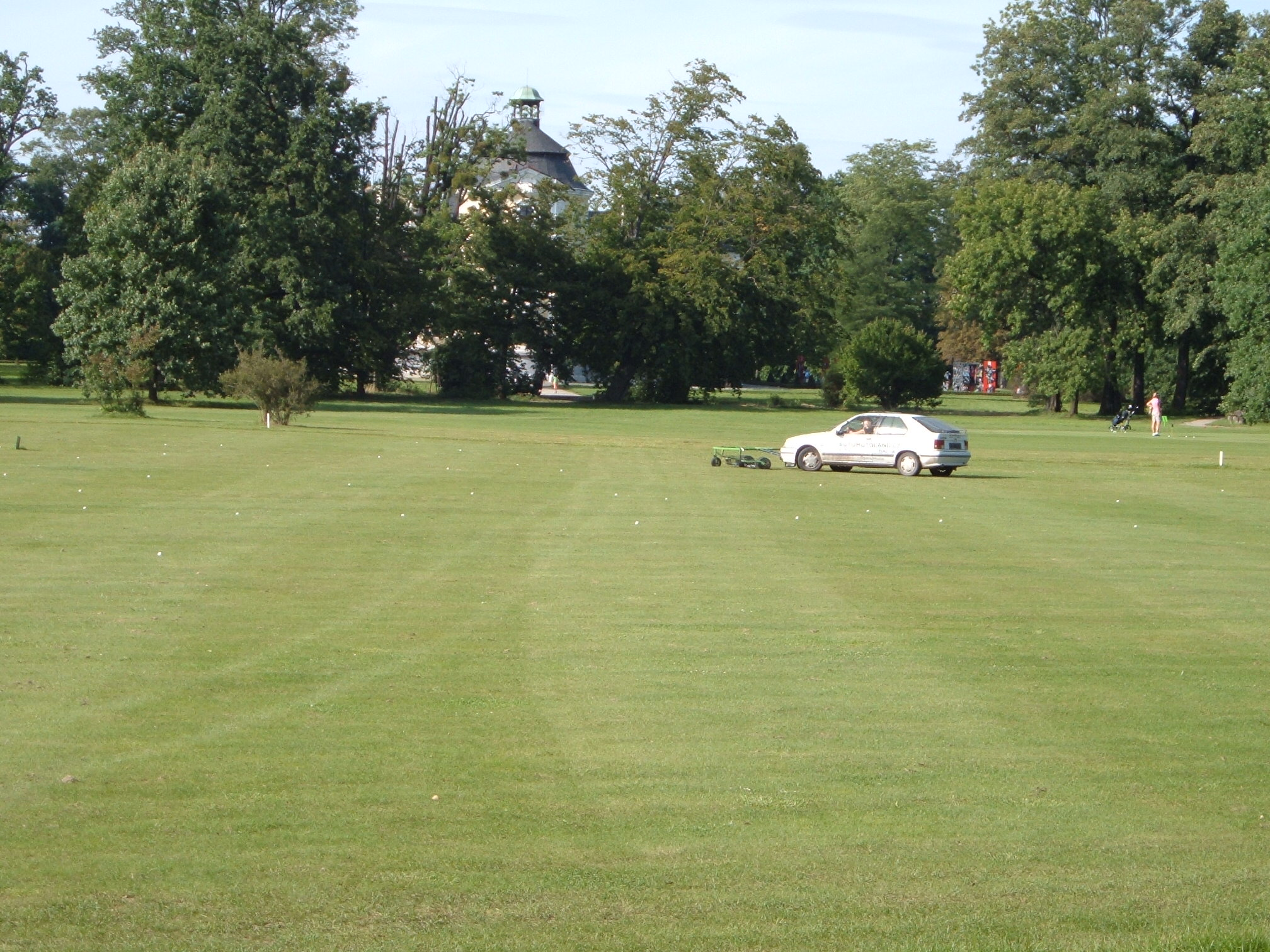
Golf course in the castle park

There is an ice-hockey venue Buly Aréna, which was opened in 2003. It has a capacity of 640 seats.

The town's football team is MFK Kravaře. It plays in lower amateur tiers.

There is a golf course in the castle park.

== Sights ==
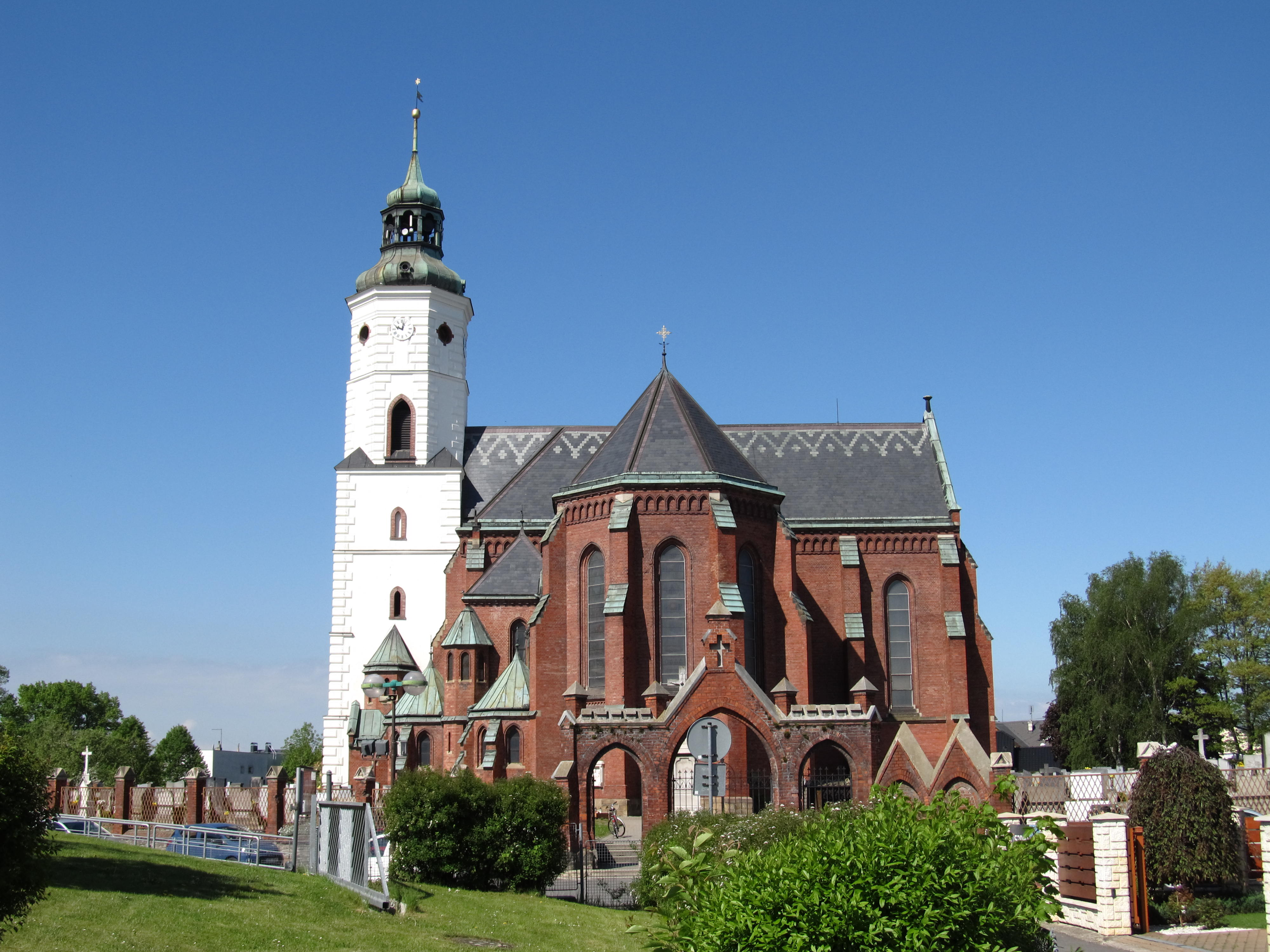
Church of Saint Bartholomew

One of the two main landmarks of the towns is Kravaře Castle. In 1990, the Baroque castle was acquired by the town. Today it serves as a cultural and social centre and houses a museum with permanent baroque and ethnographic exhibitions. The castle includes a 21 ha (52 acres) large castle park with several ponds and with several rare tree species.

The second landmark is the Church of Saint Bartholomew. The oldest part of the church is the white Renaissance tower from the early 16th century. The neo-Gothic church complex which includes the nave, the rectory and the former convent of the Sisters of the Heart of God (today the town hall), was built at the turn of the 19th and 20th centuries. The church was consecrated in 1896. Near the church stands a Baroque sandstone statue of St. John of Nepomuk from 1730.

== Notable people ==
- Pavel Kravař (1391–1433), Hussite medical doctor burned at the stake for heresy
- Michael Sendivogius (1566–1636), Polish alchemist, philosopher and medical doctor; lived and died here
- Karl Albert Scherner (1825–1889), German philosopher and psychologist
- Ivo Žídek (1926–2003), opera singer
- Josef Jařab (1937–2023), academic and politician
- Evžen Hadamczik (1939–1984), football player and manager
- Alois Hadamczik (born 1952), ice hockey coach
- Monika Brzesková (born 1977), politician and beauty pageant titleholder; mayor of Kravaře

== Twin towns – sister cities ==
Kravaře is twinned with:

- Lisková, Slovakia
- Lubliniec, Poland
- Woźniki, Poland
