= Miss Europe 1927 =

International beauty pageant

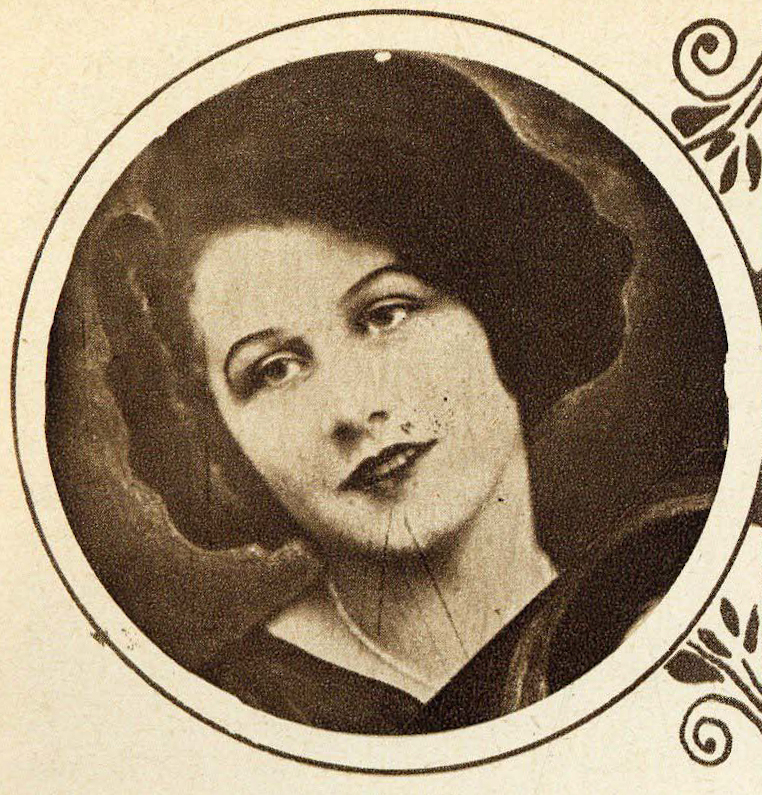
- Miss Europe 1927, Štefica Vidačić
- Date: 5 February 1927 / 15 March 1927
- Venue: Sofiensaal, Vienna, Austria/Berlin, Weimar Republic
- Entrants: 10
- Placements: 3
- Debuts: Austria, Baltic States, Bulgaria, Czechoslovakia, Greece, Hungary, Poland, Romania, Turkey, Yugoslavia
- Winner: Štefica Vidačić; Yugoslavia

Miss Europe 1927 was the first ever edition of the Miss Europe pageant and the only edition under Fanamet, the European distributor of Paramount. It was first held at Sofiensaal in Vienna, Austria on 5 February 1927. After the original panel of 12 judges couldn't decide the winner, a "runoff" was held on 15 March 1927 in Berlin, Germany. The winner was chosen by Friedrich Wilhelm Murnau who then starred in a movie directed by him. Štefica Vidačić of Yugoslavia emerged victorious, and was crowned Miss Europe 1927 and the first ever Miss Europe.
