= Taťána Kuchařová =

Czech model

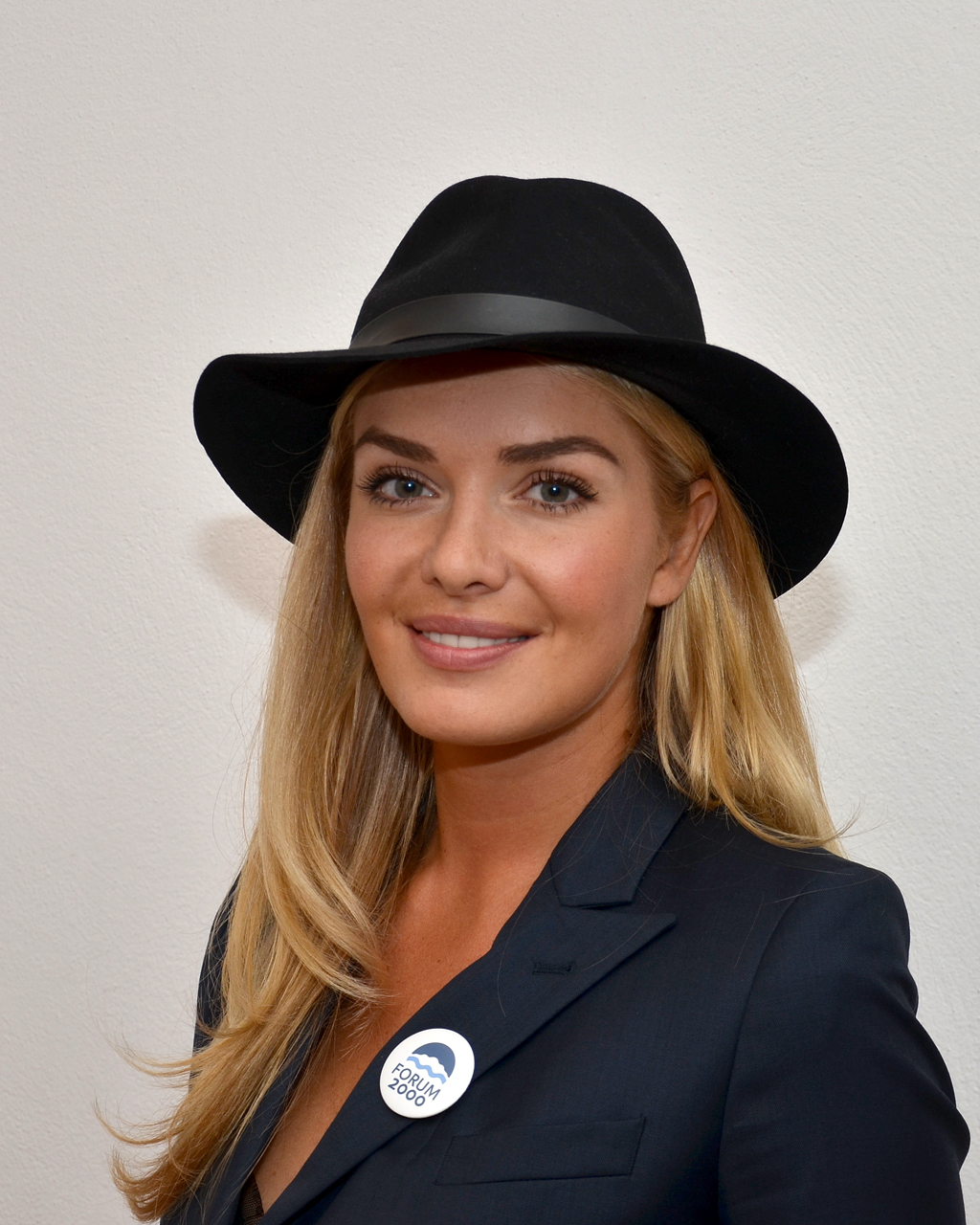
- Kuchařová in 2018
- Born: 23 December 1987 (age 38); Trnava, Czechoslovakia
- Height: 1.76 m (5 ft 9 in)
- Spouse: Ondřej Gregor Brzobohatý (m. 2016–2022)
- Beauty pageant titleholder
- Title: Miss Czech Republic 2006; Miss World 2006
- Hair color: Blonde
- Eye color: Green
- Major competitions: Miss Czech Republic 2006 (Winner); Miss World 2006 (Winner)

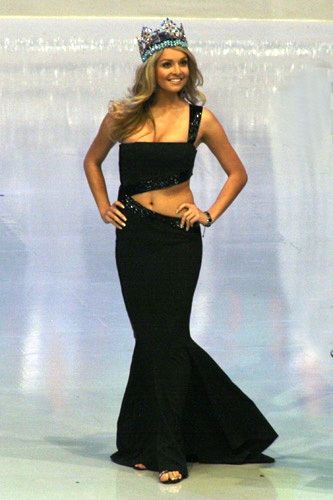
Taťána Kuchařová as Miss World 06

Taťána Kuchařová, formerly Taťána Gregor Brzobohatá (Czech pronunciation: [ˈtacaːna ˈkuxar̝ovaː]; born 23 December 1987) is a Czech model and beauty queen who won the title of Miss Czech Republic and Miss World 2006. In doing so, she made history to become the first woman from the Czech Republic ever to win the title at the final event of the Miss World competition, held on 30 September 2006, in Warsaw, Poland. She finished in second place in StarDance, the Czech version of Dancing with the Stars, in 2013.

== Biography ==
Kuchařová was born on 23 December 1987 in Czechoslovakia. Her hometown is Trnava, nowadays located in Slovakia. She lives in Opočno, a small town in the north of the Czech Republic. In 2006, aged 18, whilst studying at a grammar school, Kuchařová competed in the Czech Miss 2006 competition, and won it. This triumph guaranteed the participation in Miss World, which took place in Warsaw. Kuchařová won Miss World too, which made her well-known all over the world.

== Miss World 2006 ==
Kuchařová beat 103 other women in voting among a panel of judges and from television viewers around the world during a two-hour finals ceremony in the Polish capital, where the president of Warsaw watched the finals, and presented the new Miss World with a scroll, dubbing her as an honorary ambassador of Warsaw, and asking her to carry a message of peace around the world.

Kuchařová, a 177 cm tall high school student with long blond hair, was born in Trnava, Slovakia and grew up in the town of Opočno, Czech Republic. She told the judges that she wants to attend university and then become a model, which she hopes will enable her to travel.

In December 2006, she appeared in a fashion video, directed and produced by Alexander Schukoff in Vienna for Fashion TV.

Kuchařová handed over her crown on 1 December 2007, to the next Miss World, Zhang Zilin of China in Sanya, China. Amongst the countries she travelled to during her reign were Poland, United Arab Emirates, Mexico, United States, China, Russia, South Africa, United Kingdom, Trinidad and Tobago, Fiji, Ireland, Iceland, Croatia, San Marino, Northern Ireland, Russia, Sri Lanka, and Latvia.

She subsequently graduated from high school nine months after winning the title.

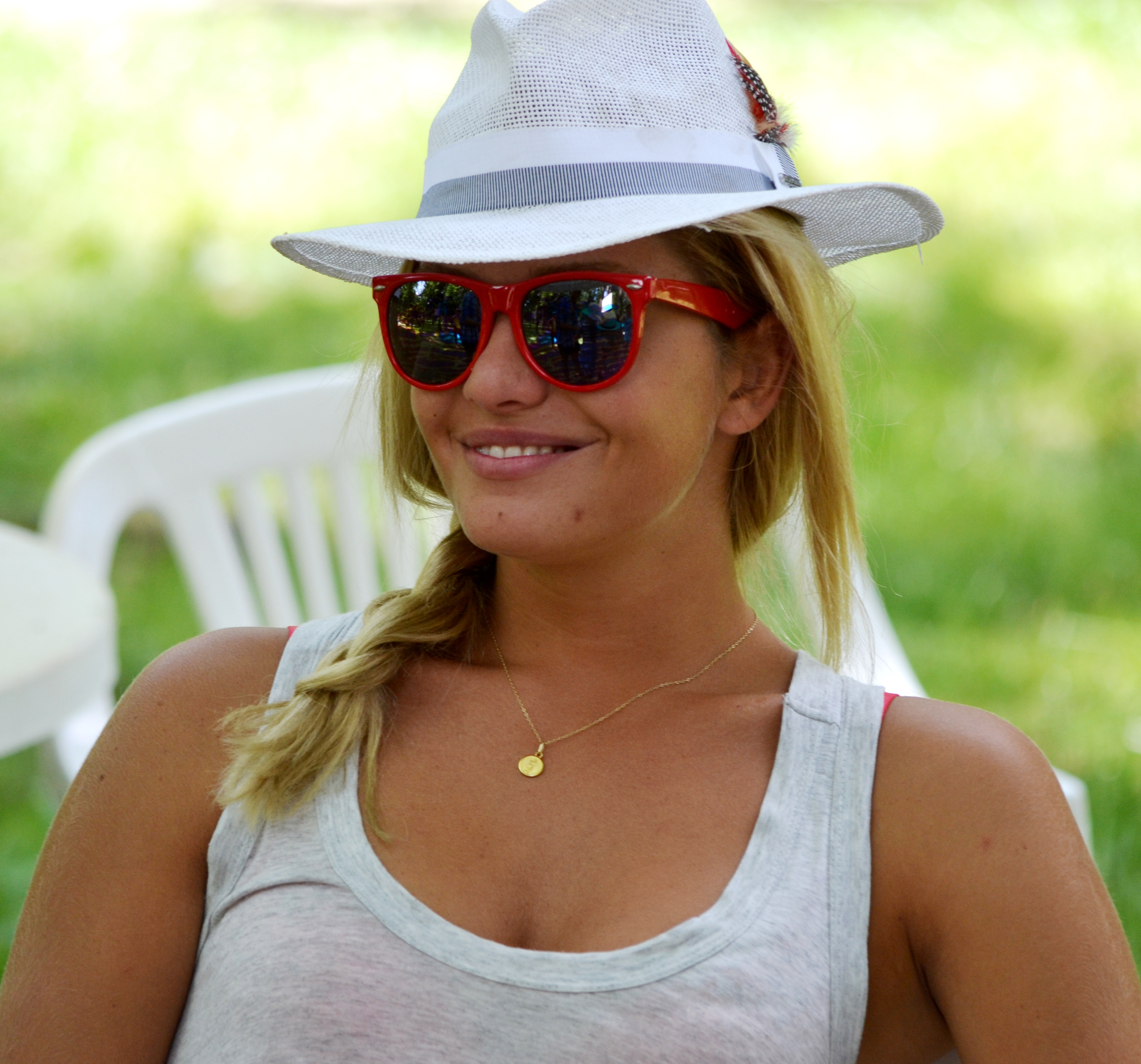
Taťána Kuchařová 2013

== Personal life ==
On 30 July 2016, Kuchařová married Czech musician Ondřej Gregor Brzobohatý. They got divorced in March 2022.

Awards and achievements
Preceded by (Iceland) Unnur Birna Vilhjálmsdóttir	Miss World; 2006	Succeeded by (China) Zhang Zilin
Preceded by Lucie Králová	Miss Czech Republic; 2006	Succeeded by Kateřina Sokolová
