= Miss Europe 1971 =

International beauty pageant

- Date: 19 September 1971
- Venue: Palais des sports d'El Menzah, Tunis, Tunisia
- Entrants: 21
- Placements: 7
- Withdrawals: Scotland & Wales
- Returns: Denmark, Norway & Sweden
- Winner: Filiz Vural; Turkey
- Miss Amity: Josefina Román; Spain

Miss Europe 1971 was the 34th edition of the Miss Europe pageant and the 23rd edition under the Mondial Events Organization. It was held at the Palais des sports d'El Menzah in Tunis, Tunisia on 19 September 1971. Filiz Vural of Turkey was crowned Miss Europe 1971 by outgoing titleholder Noelia Alfonso Cabrera of Spain.

== Results ==
=== Placements ===
| Placement | Contestant |
|---|---|
| Miss Europe 1971 | Turkey – Filiz Vural |
| 1st Runner-Up | Austria – Ursula Illich |
| 2nd Runner-Up | Sweden – Lena Arvidsson |
| 3rd Runner-Up | France – Myriam Stocco |
| 4th Runner-Up | Holland – Laura Mulder-Smid |
| Top 7 | Finland – Pirjo Laitila |

=== Special awards ===
| Award | Contestant |
|---|---|
| Miss Amity | Spain – Josefina Román |

== Contestants ==
- Austria – Ursula Illich
- Belgium – Martine Yasmine de Hert
- Denmark – Dorrit Weinrich
- England – Pamela Wood
- Finland – Pirjo Laitila
- France – Myriam Stocco
- Germany – Lilian Atterer
- Greece – Georgia "Gogo" Atzoletaki
- Holland – Laura Mulder-Smid
- Iceland – Margret Linda Björnsson Gunnarsdóttir
- Ireland – Mary Aurray
- Italy – Roberta Mauro
- Luxembourg – Mariette Werckx
- Malta – Tessa Marthese Galea
- Norway – Ruby Reitan
- Portugal – Ana Paula de Almeida
- Spain – Josefina "Fina" Román Gutierrez de Chiclana
- Sweden – Lena Arvidsson
- Switzerland – Anita Andrini
- Turkey – Filiz Vural
- Yugoslavia – Magda (Majda) Jazbec

== Notes ==
=== Withdrawals ===
- Scotland
- Wales

=== Returns ===
- Denmark
- Norway
- Sweden

== "Comité Officiel et International Miss Europe" Competition ==
Miss Europa 1971
- Date: 2 September 1971
- Venue: Florence, Italy
- Entrants: 1+
- Winner: Laurence Vallée; France

From 1951 to 2002 there was a rival Miss Europe competition organized by the "Comité Officiel et International Miss Europe". This was founded in 1950 by Jean Raibaut in Paris, the headquarters later moved to Marseille. The winners wore different titles like Miss Europe, Miss Europa or Miss Europe International.

This year contest took place in Florence, Italy on 2 September 1971. The number of delegates is unknown. At the end, Laurence Vallée of France was crowned as Miss Europa 1971. She succeeded predecessor Marie Korner (Körner) of Germany.

=== Placements ===
| Final results | Contestant |
|---|---|
| Miss Europa 1971 | France – Laurence Vallée |

=== Contestants ===
- France – Laurence Vallée
