= Miss Czech Republic 2026 =

15th Miss Czech Republic pageant edition

- Date: 23 May 2026
- Presenters: Justýna Zedníková; Daniela Brzobohatá
- Entertainment: Jan Nedvěd
- Venue: Forum Karlín, Prague
- Broadcaster: Nova Fun TV
- Entrants: 20
- Placements: 10
- Winner: Lucie Pisková; Ostrava
- Photogenic: Lucie Pisková, Ostrava
- Popularity: Dominique Alagia, Prague
- Best Start Up: Barbara Plintová, Třinec

Miss Czech Republic 2026 was the 15th edition of the Miss Czech Republic pageant, held at the Forum Karlín in Prague, Czech Republic, on 23 May 2026. The contest was hosted by former Miss Czech Republic titleholder Justýna Zedníková and TV host Daniela Brzobohatá. Nova Fun TV broadcast the coronation night.

Linda Górecká of Dětmarovice crowned Lucie Pisková of Ostrava as her successor at the end of the event. She will represent the Czech Republic at the Miss World 2027 pageant, to be held in Tanzania.

Representatives for Miss Grand International 2026, Miss International 2026, Miss Earth 2026, and Miss Supranational 2027, were also crowned at the event.

== Results ==
=== Placements: First Stage ===
Color keys

- Declared the winner
- Finished as a finalist or runner-up
- Finished as one of the semifinalists
- The contestant was unplaced.

Placement	Contestant	International placement
Miss Grand Czech Republic 2026	Prague – Dominique Alagia	Withdrew – Miss Grand International 2026
1st Runner-Up	Ostrava – Hana Dědková	Top 25 – Miss Grand International 2026
2nd Runner-Up	Liberec – Markéta Králová	
Top 5	Brno – Sandra Chalupníková; Ostrava – Lucie Pisková	

=== Placements: Second Stage ===
Placement	Contestant	International placement
Miss Czech Republic 2026	Ostrava – Lucie Pisková	TBA – Miss World 2027
Miss Supranational Czech Republic 2026	Třinec – Barbara Plintová	TBA – Miss Supranational 2027
Miss International Czech Republic 2026	Prague – Laura Glozarová	TBA – Miss International 2026
Miss Earth Czech Republic 2026	Ostrava – Hana Dědková	Withdrew – Miss Earth 2026
Miss Earth Czech Republic 2026	Liberec – Markéta Králová	TBA – Miss Earth 2026
Runner-Up	Pardubice – Eliška Kukačová	
Top 10	Luhačovice – Aneta Vizinová; Brno – Sandra Chalupníková; Opava – Eliška Kramná	

=== Special awards ===
Award	Winner
Best Start Up	Luhačovice – Aneta Vizinová
Miss Photogenic	Ostrava – Lucie Pisková
Miss Popularity	Prague – Dominique Alagia
Top Model	Třinec – Barbara Plintová

== Selection committee ==
The panel of judges consisted of:

- Linda Górecká – Miss Czech Republic 2025
- Michal Židek – Representative of Seventa
- Natálie Puškinová – Miss Earth 2025 from the Czech Republic
- Emma Tiglao – Miss Grand International 2025 from the Philippines
- Taťána Makarenko – Founder and president of Miss Czech Republic
- Lubomír Nymburský – Entrepreneur and investor
- Krystyna Pyszková – Miss World 2023 from the Czech Republic
- Andrea Eichingerová – Fashion designer
- Gabriela Roušarová – Representative of Vivo
- Eduarda Braum – Miss Supranational 2025 from Brazil
- Antonín Gazdík – Representative of Planthé Laboratories
- Zaved Khan – Representative of Planthé India

== Contestants ==
The following are the 20 official contestants:

Contestants	Age (Note: Ages at the time of the pageant.)	City	Placements
Aneta Vizinová	31	Luhačovice	Semifinal (Top 10)
Sandra Chalupníková	24	Brno	Semifinal (Top 10)
Dominique Alagia	21	Prague	Semifinal (Top 10)
Markéta Králová	21	Liberec	Semifinal (Top 10)
Eliška Kramná	22	Opava	Semifinal (Top 10)
Barbara Plintová	23	Třinec	Semifinal (Top 10)
Laura Glozarová	18	Prague	Semifinal (Top 10)
Lucie Pisková	22	Ostrava	Semifinal (Top 10)
Hana Dědková	25	Ostrava	Semifinal (Top 10)
Eliška Kukačová	26	Pardubice	Semifinal (Top 10)
Veronika Veselá	17	Liberec	Eliminated (Top 14)
Glenda Fopp	21	Liberec	Eliminated (Top 14)
Pavlína Pavlícková	17	Zlín	Eliminated (Top 14)
Natálie Burešová	25	Zastávka	Eliminated (Top 14)
Sofie Šafářová	18	Olomouc	Eliminated (Top 16)
Zuzana Šabacká	17	Plzeň	Eliminated (Top 16)
Tereza Procházková	22	Prague	Eliminated (Top 18)
Kristýna Kučerová	23	Brno	Eliminated (Top 18)
Aneta Schlingerová	23	Brno	Eliminated (Top 20)
Karolína Jandová	21	Prague	Eliminated (Top 20)
