= Miss Czech Republic =

Beauty pageant

Miss Czech Republic; Mister Czech Republic
- Formation: 2010 (as Miss Face Czech Republic); 2018 (as Miss Czech Republic)
- Type: Beauty pageant
- Headquarters: Prague
- Location: Czech Republic
- Official language: Czech
- Director: Taťána Makarenko
- Parent organization: Miss Factory s.r.o.
- Affiliations: List of franchises: Miss World; Miss Grand International; Miss Supranational; Miss International; Miss Earth
- Website: www.missczechrep.cz

Miss Czech Republic is a national beauty pageant in the Czech Republic where the winner represents the country at Miss World.

== History ==
Miss Czech Republic was founded by Taťána Makarenko, who still organizes the pageant. The organization was originally called Miss Face Czech Republic until January 2018.

Winners of international beauty pageants:

- One — Top Model of the World winner: Natálie Kočendová (2021)
- One — Miss World winner: Krystyna Pyszková (2023)
- One — Miss Earth winner: Natálie Puškinová (2025)

== Titles ==
Note that the year designates the time Miss & Mister Czech Republic acquired that particular pageant franchise.

Current Franchises
Membership	Year
Female international beauty pageants:
Miss World	2013 – Present
Miss Grand International	2015 – Present
Miss Supranational	2015 – Present
Miss International	2017 – Present
Miss Earth	2025 – Present
Male international beauty pageants:
Mister World	2019 – Present
Mister Supranational	2023 – Present

Former Franchises
Membership	Year
Female international beauty pageants:
Miss Intercontinental	2015 – 2025
Miss Charm	2023
Miss Globe International	2014 – 2022
Top Model of the World	2021
Miss Global	2016 – 2019
Miss Tourism Queen International	2015

Gallery

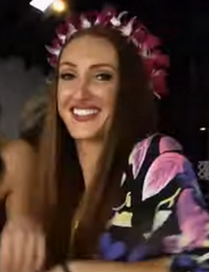
Taťána Makarenko
Pageant director and Miss Grand Czech 2015

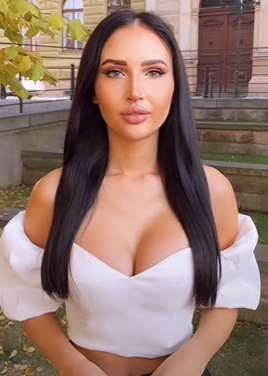
Barbora Aglerová
3rd vice-Miss 2020 and Miss Grand Czech 2021

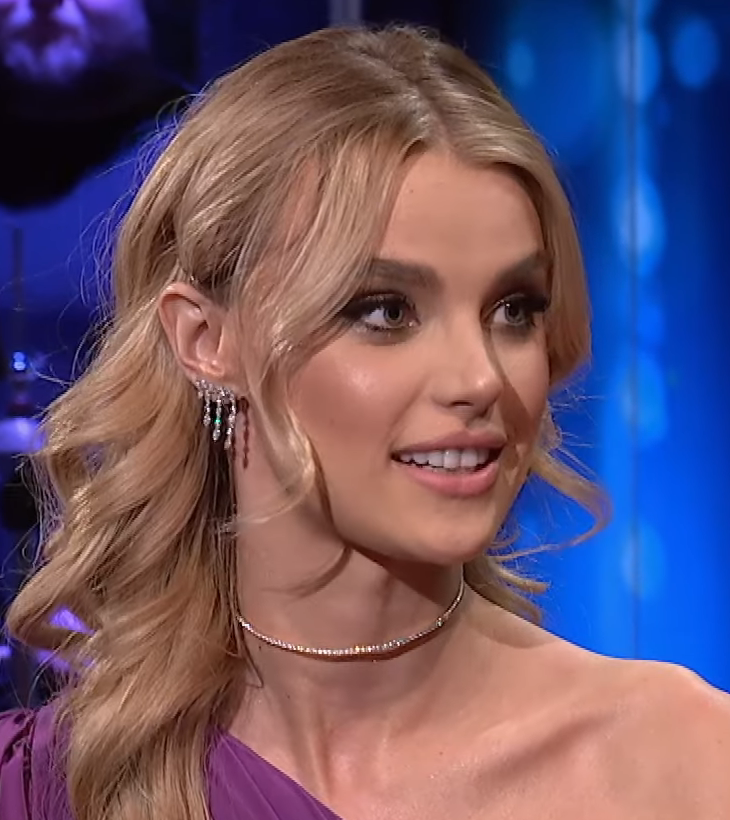
Krystyna Pyszková
Miss Czech Republic 2022 and Miss World 2023

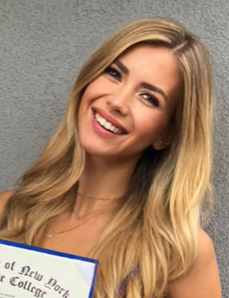
Mariana Bečková
2nd vice-Miss 2022 and Miss Grand Czech 2022

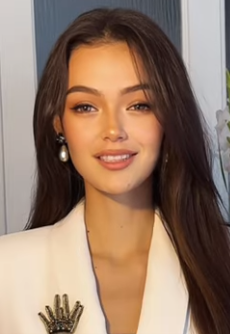
Sophia Osako
Miss Grand Czech Republic 2023

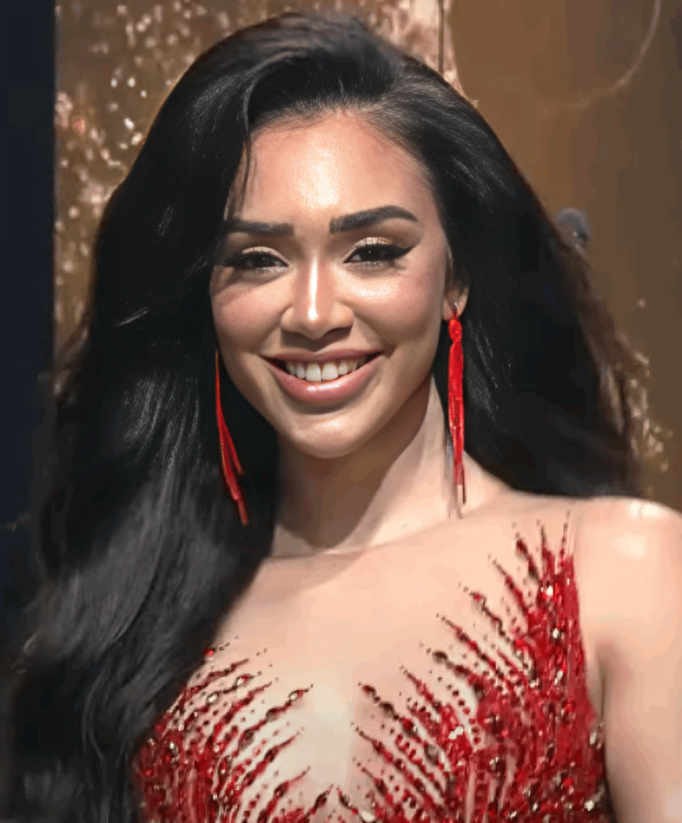
Veronica Biasiol
Miss Grand Czech Republic 2024

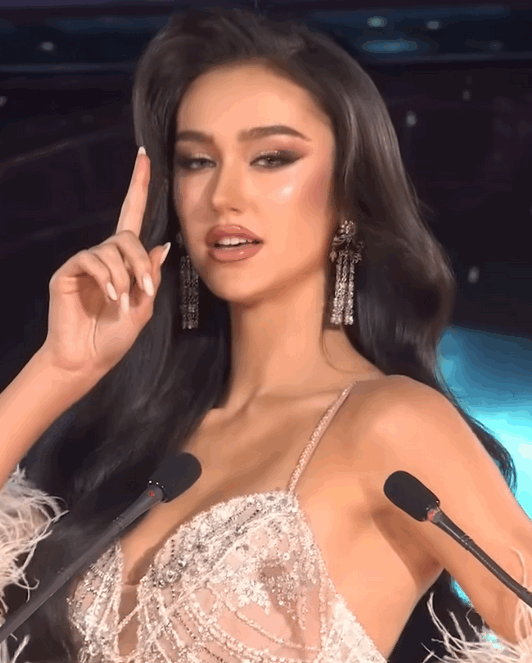
Markéta Mörwicková
Miss Grand Czech Republic 2025

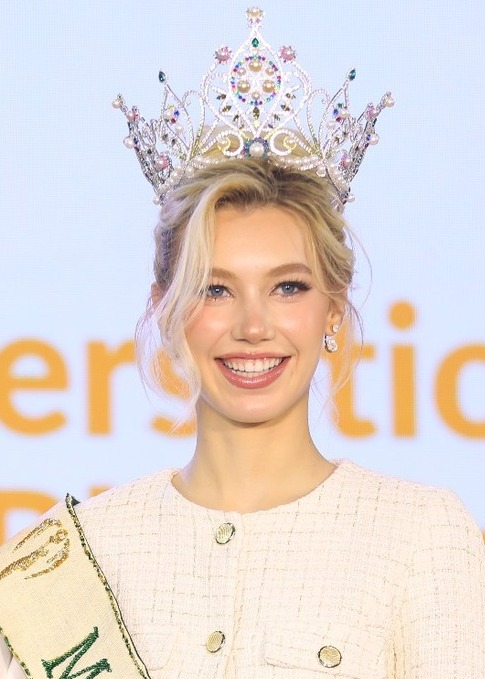
Natálie Puškinová
3rd vice-Miss 2025 and Miss Earth 2025

== Titleholders ==
=== Before 2020: Single stage ===
In advance of 2023, the main winners were sent to Miss Grand International (2015–2016) and Miss World (2017–2022), while the runners-up were assigned to participate in other different international pageants.

Miss World
Miss Grand International
Miss Supranational

Miss International
Miss Intercontinental
Miss Global

Miss Globe International
Miss Tourism Queen International
Miss Tourism International

Year	Miss Czech Republic	Runners Up			
Year	Miss Czech Republic	1st Runner Up	2nd Runner Up	3rd Runner Up	4th Runner Up
2010	Lucie Klukavá (Ostrava)	Pavlína Richtářová (Haňovice)	Kateřina Marečková (Předboj)	Not Awarded	Not awarded
2011	Lenka Hovorková (Chrudim)	Lucie Zatloukalová (Olomouc	Veronika Matrasová (Pardubice)	Not Awarded	Not awarded
2012	Zuzana Juračková (Prague)	Lucie Kovandová (Dolní Kounice)	Patricie Skálová (Prague)	Not Awarded	Not awarded
2013	Šárka Karnetová (Prague)	Julie Řeháková (Prague)	Simona Kopečná (Prague)	Nikola Franková (Prague)	Not awarded
2014	Nela Prášilová (Prague)	Claudie Bezpalcová (Prague)	Veronika Dejová (Jihlava)	Monika Vrágová (Prague)	Not awarded
2015	Monika Vaculíková (Bruntál)	Natálie Myslíková (Prague)	Nikola Bechyňová (Prague)	Veronika Thielová (Prague)	Not awarded
2016	Nikola Uhlířová (Baška)	Alice Činčurová (Prague)	Zuzana Straková (Brno)	Sarah Karolyiová (Prague)	Not awarded
2017/18	Kateřina Kasanová (Semily)	Kristýna Langová (Prague)	Daniela Zálešáková (Most)	Veronika Volkeová (Prague)	Not awarded
2019	Denisa Spergerová (České Budějovice)	Maria Boichenko (Prague)	Andrea Prchalová (Havlíčkův Brod)	Miroslava Pikolová (Prague)	Hana Vágnerová (Prague)

=== 2020 – 2022: Supplemental titles announced ===
During this period, the pageant was organized as a single stage. But the titles of the vice queens are designated after the international pageant for which they are competing, in contrast to the earlier period when they were referred to as the 1st to 4th runners-up.

Miss World
Miss Grand International

Miss Supranational
Miss International

Miss Intercontinental
Top Model of the World

Year	Miss Czech Republic	Vice Queens			
Year	Miss Czech Republic	2nd Place	3rd Place	4th Place	5th Place
2020/21	Karolína Kopíncová (Brno)	Angelika Kostyshynová (Ústí nad Labem)	Natálie Kočendová (Karviná)	Barbora Aglerová (Prague)	Veronika Šmídová (Prostějov)
2022	Krystyna Pyszková (Prague)	Kristýna Malířová (Ústí nad Labem)	Mariana Becková (Prague)	Adéla Maděryčová (Břeclav)	Karolína Syroťuková (Ústí nad Labem)

=== Since 2023: Two finals ===
Beginning in 2023, the contest was being held in two stages with the same batch of delegates; the first stage was to determine the country representative for Miss Grand International separately, and the remaining delegates then competed again in the second stage, where the representatives for Miss World, as well as other international pageants, were determined.

Miss World
Miss Grand International

Miss Supranational
Miss International

Miss Earth
Miss Intercontinental

Year	Miss Czech Republic	Vice queens				Miss Grand Czech Republic	Vice queens	
Year	Miss Czech Republic	2nd Place	3rd Place	4th Place	5th Place	Miss Grand Czech Republic	2nd Place	3rd Place
2023	Justýna Zedníková (Note: Due to no Miss World pageant in 2024, Zedníková was then appointed Miss Supranational Czech Republic 2024.) (Prague)	Marie Jedličková (Prague)	Dominika Něměcková (Prague)	Anna Benešová (Prague)	—	Sophia Osako (Prague)	—	—
2024	Adéla Štroffeková (Prague)	Michaela Macháčková (Prague)	Alina Demenťjeva (Vysočina)	Julie Smékalová (Prague)	—	Veronika Biasiol (Prague)	—	—
2025	Linda Górecká (Prague)	Karolína Gorylová (Český Těšín)	Simona Procházková (Prague)	Natálie Puškinová (Brno)	Anna Marie Mařáková (Prague)	Markéta Mörwicková (Prague)	—	—
2026	Lucie Pisková (Ostrava)	Barbara Plintová (Třinec)	Laura Glozarová (Prague)	Hana Dědková (Note: Due to health issues, Dominique was unable to compete in the Miss Grand International 2026 and was replaced by Hana.) (Ostrava)	Eliška Kukačová (Pardubice)	Dominique Alagia (Prague)	Hana Dědková (Ostrava)	Markéta Králová (Liberec)

== International placements ==
- : Declared as Winner
- : Ended as runner-up or top 5/6 qualification
- : Ended as one of the finalists or semifinalists
- : Ended as special awards winner

=== Current franchises ===
==== Miss World ====
Year	Representative's Name	Region	Title	Placement	Special Awards
2027	Lucie Pisková	Prague	Miss Czech Republic 2026	TBA	
2026	Linda Górecká	Prague	Miss Czech Republic 2025	Unplaced	Top 21 - Top Model challenge (Top 5 of Europe from 4 continentals)
2025	Adéla Štroffeková	Prague	Miss Czech Republic 2024	Unplaced	Top 24 - Talent Challenge
2023	Krystyna Pyszková	Prague	Miss Czech Republic 2022	Miss World 2023	Best Designer Dress Award; Top 10 - Beauty with a Purpose; Top 20 - Miss World Top Model
2021	Karolína Kopíncová	Brno	Miss Czech Republic 2020/21	Top 13	Top 10 - Beauty with a Purpose; Top 13 - Miss World Top Model
2019	Denisa Spergerová	České Budějovice	Miss Czech Republic 2019	Unplaced	Top 10 - Miss World Top Model
2018	Kateřina Kasanová	Semily	Miss Czech Republic 2017/18	Unplaced	Top 12 - Miss World Talent
2013	Lucie Kovandová	Dolní Kounice	1st Runner-Up of 2012	Unplaced	Top 33 - Beach Fashion

==== Miss Grand International ====
Miss Czech Republic acquired the license of Miss Grand International for Czech Republic in 2015. Previously, from 2013 to 2014, the license belonged to another national pageant, České Miss.

Year	Representative's Name	Region	Title	Placement	Special Awards
2027	TBA	TBA	TBA	TBA	
2026	Hana Dědková	Ostrava	3rd Runner-Up of 2026	Top 25	Top 7 - Grand Talent
2026	Dominique Alagia	Prague	Miss Grand Czech Republic 2026	Withdrew	
2025	Markéta Mörwicková	Prague	Miss Grand Czech Republic 2025	5th Runners-Up	Top 15 - Grand Talent; Top 20 - Country's Power of the Year; Top 20 - Best in Swimsuit
2024	Veronica Biasiol	Prague	Miss Grand Czech Republic 2024	Unplaced	Top 22 - Best in National Costume
2023	Sophia Osako	Moravia	Miss Grand Czech Republic 2023	Top 20	Best in Áo dài Top 18 - Grand Voice Award; Top 20 - Country's Power of the Year
2022	Mariana Bečková	Prague	Miss Grand Czech Republic 2022	4th Runner-up	Miss Social Media; Top 10 - Best in Sportswear and Swimsuit
2021	Barbora Aglerová	Prague	Miss Grand Czech Republic 2020/21	Unplaced	
2020	Denisa Spergerová	České Budějovice	Miss Czech Republic 2019	Top 10	Top 10 - Best in Swimsuit
2019	Maria Boichenko	Prague	1st Runner-Up of 2019	Top 20	
2018	Kristýna Langová	Prague	1st Runner-Up of 2017/18	Unplaced	
2017	Nikola Uhlířová	Baška	Miss Czech Republic 2016	4th Runner-up	
2016	Monika Vaculíková	Bruntál	Miss Czech Republic 2015	Unplaced	
2015	Taťána Makarenko	Prague	Appointed	Top 20	
2014	Jana Zapletarova	Prague	iMiss 2011	Unplaced	
2013	Markéta Břízová	Ostrava	České Miss 2013 – Top 10	Unplaced	

==== Miss Supranational ====
Year	Representative's Name	Region	Title	Placement	Special Awards
2027	Barbara Plintová	Moravian-Silesian	Miss Supranational Czech Republic 2026	TBA	
2026	Karolína Gorylová	Český Těšín	Miss Supranational Czech Republic 2025	4th Runner-Up	Top 20 - Supra Influencer
2025	Michaela Macháčková	Prague	Miss Supranational Czech Republic 2024	Top 12	Top 10 - Supra Model of the Year
2024	Justýna Zedníková	Prague	Miss Czech Republic 2023	2nd Runner-up	Top 5 - Supra Chat Group 1 Top 7 - Miss Talent
2023	Marie Jedličková	Prague	Miss Supranational Czech Republic 2023	Unplaced	Top Model of the Europe; Top 29 - Miss Talent
2022	Kristýna Malířová	Ústí nad Labem	Miss Supranational Czech Republic 2022	Top 12	Top Model; Top 42 - Miss Supra Influencer
2021	Angelika Kostyshynová	Ústí nad Labem	Miss Supranational Czech Republic 2020/21	Top 24	Top 11 - Miss Elegance
2019	Hana Vágnerová	Prague	4th Runner-up of 2019	Top 10	Miss Supranational Europe; Top 10 - Supra Fan Vote; Top 16 - Supra Chat with Valeria
2015	Taťána Makarenko	Prague	Appointed	Top 20	Miss Photogenic; Top 3 - Best Body
2013	Lucie Klukavá	Ostrava	Miss Czech Republic 2010	Unplaced	
2012	Michaela Dihlová	Kozmice	Appointed	2nd Runner-Up	Miss Photogenic
2011	Aneta Grabcová	Hodonín	Appointed	Unplaced	
2010	Hana Verná	Prague	Appointed	1st Runner-Up	
2009	Aneta Zelena	Prostějov	Appointed	Unplaced	

==== Miss International ====
Year	Representative's Name	Region	Title	Placement	Special Awards
2026	Laura Glozarová	Prague	Miss International Czech Republic 2026	TBA	
2025	Simona Prochazkova	Prague	Miss International Czech Republic 2025	Unplaced	Miss Elegance
2024	Alina Demenťjeva	Vysočina	Miss International Czech Republic 2024	Top 8	
2023	Dominika Němečková	Prague	Miss International Czech Republic 2023	Unplaced	
2022	Adéla Maděryčová	Břeclav	Miss International Czech Republic 2022	Unplaced	
2019	Andrea Prchalová	Havlíčkův Brod	2nd Runner-Up of 2019	Unplaced	
2018	Daniela Zálešáková	Most	2nd Runner-Up of 2017/18	Unplaced	
2017	Alice Činčurová	Prague	1st Runner-Up of 2016	Unplaced	

==== Miss Earth ====
Year	Representative's Name	Region	Title	Placement	Special Awards
2026	Hana Dědková	Moravian-Silesian	Miss Earth Czech Republic 2026	TBA	
2025	Natálie Puškinová	Prague	Miss Earth Czech Republic 2025	Miss Earth 2025	(gold) Best in Talent (Water group)

=== Former franchises ===
==== Miss Intercontinental ====
Year	Representative's Name	Region	Title	Placement	Special Awards
2025	Anna Marie Mařáková	Prague	Miss Intercontinental Czech Republic 2025	Top 22	
2024	Julie Smékalová	Prague	Miss Intercontinental Czech Republic 2024	Top 22	
2023	Anna Benešová	Prague	Miss Intercontinental Czech Republic 2023	Top 22	
2022	Karolína Syroťuková	Prague	Miss Intercontinental Czech Republic 2022	Top 20	Sunrise Meraki Model
2021	Veronika Šmídová	Prostějov	Miss Intercontinental Czech Republic 2020/21	Top 20	
2019	Miroslava Pikolová	Prague	3rd Runner-Up of 2019	Top 20	
2018	Veronika Volkeová	Prague	3rd Runner-Up of 2017/18	Top 20	
2017	Sarah Karolyiová	Prague	3rd Runner-Up of 2016	Top 15	
2016	Veronika Thielová	Prague	3rd Runner-Up of 2015	Top 15	Best Smile
2015	Natálie Myslíková	Prague	1st Runner-Up of 2015	Top 15	

==== Miss Global ====
Year	Representative's Name	Region	Title	Placement	Special Awards
2018	Nikola Uhlířová	Baška	Miss Czech Republic 2016	Top 20	
2017	Zuzana Straková	Brno	2nd Runner-Up of 2016	Top 20	
2016	Nikola Bechyňová	Prague	2nd Runner-Up of 2015	3rd runner up	

==== Top Model of the World ====
Year	Representative's Name	Region	Title	Placement	Special Awards
2021	Natálie Kočendová	Karviná	Miss International; Czech Republic 2020/21	Top Model of the World 2021	Best Style; Miss Sunrise

==== Miss Globe ====
Year	Representative's Name	Region	Title	Placement	Special Awards
2015	Šárka Karnetová	Prague	Miss Czech Republic 2013	Unplaced	Miss Elegance

==== Miss Tourism Queen International ====
Year	Representative's Name	Region	Title	Placement	Special Awards
2015	Natálie Myslíková	Prague	1st Runner-Up of 2015	Top 10	Best Smile

==== Miss Tourism International ====
Year	Representative's Name	Region	Title	Placement	Special Awards
2013	Lucie Klukavá	Ostrava	Miss Czech Republic 2010	Unplaced	

== National finalists ==
The following list is the national finalists of the Miss Czech Republic pageant, as well as the competition results.

Color keys
W Declared as the winner
Ended as a runner-up
Ended as a semifinalist
Ended as a quarterfinalist
Ended as a special awards
Ṉ Withdrew
– Did not participate
Withdraw during the competition

=== 2015 – Present ===
Miss Czech Republic National Finalists 1st Editions (2010)
Year No.	2015	2016	2017/18	2019	2020/21	2022	2023	2024	2025	2026
01	Tereza Svobodová	Nikola Krmelova	Sarah Vu	Mirka Pikolová (3rd)	Adéla Maderycová	Michaela Macháčková	Erika Teichertová	Petra Beníšková	Sára Aubrechtová	Aneta Vizinová
02	Veronika Thielová (3rd)	Alice Činčurová (1st)	Lenka Peichlová	Andrea Prchalová (2nd)	Angelika Kostyshynová (1st)	Adela Maderycova (3rd)	Dominika Nemečková (2nd)	Adéla Štroffeková (W)	Simona Procházková (2nd)	Sandra Chalupníková
03	Natálie Myslíková (1st)	Nikola Uhlířová (W)	Sára Osmanová	Katerina Zalisova	Barbora Aglerová (3rd)	Krystyna Pyszková (W)	Veronika Dočkalová	Michaela Macháčková (1st)	Linda Gorecká (W)	Dominique Alagia (W)
04	Nikola Bechyňová (2nd)	Martina Bérešová	Veronika Volkeová (3rd)	Nela Novorytova	Jana Smejkalová	Hana Dědková	Kristýna Dušková	Marie Babíčková	Adéla Marie Cernohousová	Markéta Králová
05	Kateřina Knopová	Barbora Hačecká	Kateřina Kasanová (W)	Denisa Spergerová (W)	Karolína Kopíncová (W)	Markéta Mörwick	Sophia Maria Osako (W)	Julie Smékalová (3rd)	Markéta Mörwicková (W)	Eliška Kramná
06	Gabriela Sieglová	Veronika Vorlíčková	Kristýna Langová (1st)	Nikol Zimlova	Markéta Chytilová	Kristýna Malířová (1st)	Marie Jedličková (1st)	Alina Demenťjeva (2nd)	Karolína Gorylová (1st)	Barbara Plintová (1st)
07	Barbora Hamplová	Michaela Kadlecová	Nicole Ebnerová	Nicolle Vymetalova	Natálie Kocendová (2nd)	Karolína Syroťuková (4th)	Kateřina Mládková	Tina Diallo	Aylin Saran	Laura Anna Glozarová (2nd)
08	Andrea Žiačiková	Zuzana Straková (2nd)	Daniela Zálešáková (2nd)	Hana Vágnerová (4th)	Sandra Bourdon	Mariana Beckova (2nd)	Justýna Zedníková (W)	Michaela Sedláková	Natálie Puškinová (3rd)	Lucie Pisková (W)
09	Tereza Balcarová	Sarah Karolyiová (3rd)	Klára Bartošová	Maria Boichenko (1st)	Tereza Blatáková	Zuzana Kleckova	Nicole Ebnerová	Veronica Biasiol (W)	Anna Marie Mařáková (4th)	Hana Dědková (3rd)
10	Monika Vaculíková (W)	Veronika Krejčí	Natálie Bílá	Denisa Czervoniaková	Veronika Šmídová (4th)	Terezie Jastrzembská	Anna Benešová (3rd)	Simona Kuklová	Monika Kubísková	Eliška Kukačová (4th)
11	—	—	—	—	—	—	Barbora Bláhová	—	—	—
Total	10	10	10	10	10	10	11	10	10	10

== Mister Czech Republic ==
=== Mister World ===
Year	Representative's Name	Region	Title	Placement	Special Awards
2024	Tomas Haring	Prague	Appointed	Top 10	Top 5 - Head-to-Head Challenge; Top 17 - Multimedia Challenge; Top 20 - Sports challenge (10th Place - Swimming Round); Top 20 - Best National Costume; Top 36 - Talent Competition
2019	Jakub Kraus	Liberec	Appointed	Top 30	Top 24 - Sport challenge (Top 6 - Green Team); Top 25 - Top Model Challenge

=== Mister Supranational ===
Year	Representative's Name	Region	Title	Placement	Special Awards
2026	Daniel Zedníček	Bratislava	Appointed	Top 20	Mister Supranational Europe
2025	Tomas Haring	Prague	Appointed	Top 10	Mister Supranational Europe; Top 10 - Top Model
2024	Adam Sedro	Prague	Appointed	Top 20	
2023	Jakub Vitek	Bratislava	Appointed	Top 10	Mister Supranational Europe; Top 10 - Top Model; Top 10 - Mister Talent

== See also ==
- List of beauty pageants
- Miss Universe Czech Republic (Czech Miss)
- Miss České republiky
- Muž roku
- Mister Czech Republic
