= Miss Japan =

Japanese beauty pageant

Miss Japan ミスジャパン
- Formation: 1952–1995; 2019
- Type: Beauty pageant
- Headquarters: Tokyo
- Location: Japan
- Members: Miss Universe; (1952–1995); Miss Supranational; (2010–present)
- Official language: Japanese
- Senior Directors: Akihiro Yoshida; Takako Hashimura; Ichiro Tahara; Takahide Kitai
- Parent organization: Yoshinaga; (1952–1995); HDR Corporation (2019–present)
- Website: Official website

Miss Japan (Japanese: ミスジャパン) is a national beauty pageant in Japan. The pageant first ran from 1952 to 1995 and was led by Yoshinaga (Japanese-American Press). In 2019, the Miss Japan pageant returned with Akihiro Yoshida, Takako Hashimura, Ichiro Tahara and Takahide Kitai, from the HDR Corporation, all as senior directors. The HDR Corporation started the new Miss Japan competition after they lost the franchises for both Miss Universe and Miss Earth.

The HDR Corporation also operates the Miss and Mister Supranational contest.

== Titleholders ==
Year	Miss Japan	Japanese Name	Prefecture
1952	Himeko Kojima	小島 日女子	Osaka
1953	Kinuko Ito	伊東 絹子	Tokyo
1954	Mieko Kondo	近藤 美恵子	Aichi
1955	Keiko Takahashi	高橋 敬緯子	Tokyo
1956	Yoshie Baba	馬場 祥江	Fukushima
1957	Kyoko Otani	大谷 享子	Tokyo
1958	Tomoko Moritake	森武 知子	Fukuoka
1959	Akiko Kojima	児島 明子	Tokyo
1960	Yayoi Furuno	古野 弥生	Fukuoka
1961	Akemi Toyama	遠山 明美	Tokyo
1962	Kazuko Hirano	平野 和子	Kyoto
1963	Noriko Ando	安藤 矩子	Miyagi
1964	Chizuko Matsumoto	松本 千都子	Hyōgo
1965	Mari Katayama	片山 まり	Tokyo
1966	Atsumi Ikeno	池野 温美	Osaka
1967	Kayoko Fujikawa	藤川 香代子	Osaka
1968	Yasuyo Iino	飯野 矢住代	Tokyo
1969	Kikuyo Osuka	大須賀 喜久代	Aichi
1970	Jun Shimada	島田 純	Tokyo
1971	Shigeko Taketomi	武富 茂子	Tokyo
1972	Harumi Maeda	前田 晴美	Tokyo
1973	Miyoko Sometani	染谷 美代子	Ibaraki
1974	Eriko Tsuboi	坪井 江里子	Tokyo
1975	Sachiko Nakayama	中山 幸子	Hokkaido
1976	Miyako Iwakuni	岩国 美弥子	Osaka
1977	Kyoko Sato	佐藤 恭子	Tokyo
1978	Hisako Manda	萬田 久子	Osaka
1979	Yurika Kuroda	黒田 百合香	Tokyo
1980	Hisae Hiyama	檜山 久恵	Tokyo
1981	Mineko Orisaku	織作 峰子	Kyoto
1982	Eri Okuwaki	奥脇 絵里	Tokyo
1983	Yuko Yamaguchi	山口 遊子	Osaka
1984	Megumi Niiyama	新山 恵	Tokyo
1985	Hatsumi Furusawa	古沢 初美	Osaka
1986	Hiroko Esaki	江崎 普子	Gifu
1987	Hiroe Namba	難波 央江	Okayama
1988	Mizuho Sakaguchi	坂口 美津穂	Hyōgo
1989	Eri Tashiro	田代 絵里	Hokkaido
1990	Hiroko Miyoshi	三好 浩子	Ehime
1991	Atsuko Yamamoto	山本 亜津子	Osaka
1992	Akiko Ando	安藤 晃子	Aichi
1993	Yukiko Shiki	志岐 幸子	Hyōgo
1994	Chiaki Kawando	川人 千明	Kagawa
1995	Narumi Saeki	佐伯 成美	Saitama
No Miss Japan from 1996 to 2018
2019	Honoka Tsuchiya	土屋 炎伽	Tokyo
2020	Senna Ogawa	小川 千奈	Iwate

=== Winners by prefectures ===
Prefecture	Titles	Years
Tokyo	17	1953, 1955, 1957, 1959, 1961, 1965, 1968, 1970, 1971, 1972, 1974, 1977, 1979, 1980, 1982, 1984, 2019
Osaka	8	1952, 1966, 1967, 1976, 1978, 1983, 1985, 1991
Aichi	3	1954, 1969, 1992
Hyōgo	3	1964, 1988, 1993
Fukuoka	2	1958, 1960
Hokkaido	2	1975, 1989
Kyoto	2	1962, 1981
Ehime	1	1990
Fukushima	1	1956
Gifu	1	1986
Ibaraki	1	1973
Iwate	1	2020
Kagawa	1	1994
Miyagi	1	1963
Okayama	1	1987
Saitama	1	1995

== International pageants ==
=== Miss Supranational Japan ===
- : Declared as Winner
- : Ended as runner-up
- : Ended as one of the finalists or semifinalists
- : Ended as special awards winner

Year	Miss Supranational Japan	Japanese	Represented	Placement	Special Awards
2027	TBA	TBA	TBA	TBA	
2026	Sadia Nagatori	永鳥サディア	Saitama	Top 24	Miss Congeniality
2025	Nao Kawada	川田 奈緒	Tokyo	Unplaced	
2024	Yuki Sonoda	園田悠希	Kagoshima	Top 25	Top 7 at Miss Talent
2023	Mayuko Hanawa	花輪真由子	Ibaraki	Unplaced	Top 8 at Miss Talent
2022	Rina Okada	岡田里奈	Hokkaido	Unplaced	Top 3 at Miss Talent
2021	Emiri Shimizu	清水えみり	Gunma	Top 24	
2020	Due to the impact of COVID-19 pandemic, no pageant in 2020				
2019	Natsumi Takenaka	竹中夏美	Osaka	Unplaced	
2018	Yurika Nakamoto	中本ゆりか	Okinawa	Unplaced	
2017	Yuki Koshikawa	越川ゆき	Chiba	Top 25	
2016	Risa Nagashima	永島理沙	Gunma	Top 25	
2015	Mieko Takeuchi	竹内美恵子	Hyōgo	Top 20	
2014	Ayaka Wakao	若尾彩花	Tokyo	Unplaced	
Did not compete between 2011—2013
2010	Miou Fujinaga	藤永美桜	Tokyo	Unplaced	

=== Mister Supranational Japan ===
- : Declared as Winner
- : Ended as runner-up
- : Ended as one of the finalists or semifinalists
- : Ended as special awards winner

Year	Mister Supranational Japan	Japanese	Represented	Placement	Special Awards
Did not compete between 2020—present
2019	Reino Shimamura	島村れい乃	Tokyo	Unplaced	Top 5 at Mr Talent
2018	Jiro Matsumoto	松本次郎	Tokyo	Unplaced	
2017	Takanori Uekusa	植草隆則	Tokyo	Top 20	
2016	Ricky Wakabayashi	リッキー若林	Tokyo	Top 10	

== See also ==
- Miss Universe Japan
- Miss International Japan
- Miss World Japan
- Miss Grand Japan
- Miss Earth Japan
- Miss Nippon
- Mister Japan
