= Miss Diva 2024 =

12th edition of Miss Diva

- Date: 7 March 2025
- Venue: The LaLit, Mumbai, India
- Broadcaster: JioHotstar
- Winner: Ayushree Malik (Miss Diva Supranational 2024); Vipra Mehta (Miss Diva Cosmo 2024)

Miss Diva 2024 was the 12th edition of the Miss Diva pageant. The edition was called LIVA Miss Diva 2.0 to signify the substantial changes made to the pageant's format compared to its previous editions.

Andrea Aguilera, Miss Supranational 2023 from Ecuador, crowned Ayushree Malik as Miss Diva Supranational 2024 at the end of the event. She went on to represent India at the Miss Supranational 2025 pageant, held in June in Poland.

Ketut Permata Juliastrid, the reigning Miss Cosmo 2024, crowned Vipra Mehta as 'Miss Diva Cosmo 2024'. She represented India at the Miss Cosmo 2025 pageant in Vietnam.

== Results ==
=== Placements ===
Color keys

- The contestant secured victory in an international pageant.
- The contestant finished as a runner-up in an international pageant.
- The contestant reached the semi-finals in an international pageant.

Placement	Contestant	International Placement
Miss Diva Supranational 2024	Ayushree Malik	Top 24 – Miss Supranational 2025
Miss Diva Cosmo 2024	Vipra Mehta	Top 21 – Miss Cosmo 2025
Miss Diva Runner-Up	Yogita Rathore	
Miss Diva Content Creator 2024	Winner – Ananya Praveen; Runner-Up – Aaditi Mohanty	
Miss Diva Fashion Designer 2024	Winner – Sudhruti Padhiary; Runner-Up – Bhumika Joshi	

== Background ==
The Miss Diva 2024 introduces notable changes as it marks the first edition after the organization ended its association with Miss Universe, which had previously served as the platform for selecting representatives.

Despite this shift, the pageant will continue awarding the Miss Diva Supranational title. For the first time, Overseas Citizens of India (OCI) are eligible to compete for the main title, a change from previous years when OCI participants were only allowed to vie for runner-up positions. In addition, two new categories have been introduced for 2024: Miss Diva Fashion Designer and Miss Diva Content Creator.

On October 23, 2024, the organization announced mentors for each title. Ritika Khatnani, Miss Supranational Asia 2022, will mentor Miss Diva Supranational. Fashion designer Sonaakshi Raaj has been named mentor for Miss Diva Fashion Designer, and Bhavna Singh will guide the Miss Diva Content Creator category.

=== Format ===
The competition will follow its traditional format, starting with registration and auditions, leading up to the selection of finalists for the grand finale.

Miss Diva Supranational: As in previous editions, the Miss Diva Supranational title will be awarded based on standard evaluation criteria. The contestant chosen will exemplify the values of Miss Supranational—strength, aspiration, and inspiration. Judging will consider beauty, fitness, communication skills, personality, and commercial appeal.

Miss Diva Fashion Designer: This new title will highlight outstanding designers who demonstrate creativity and craftsmanship. Contestants will be evaluated on their styling, attention to detail, theme development, color use, fabric texture, and overall execution. Finalists will present their designs at the finale, where a winner will be selected.

Miss Diva Content Creator: This title will go to a contestant who showcases creativity and originality in content creation, particularly in the fashion and beauty space. Judging will focus on content quality, visual appeal, relevance, and engagement metrics like likes, shares, and views. A panel of judges will select eight finalists, with the winner determined through a mix of judge evaluations and public voting on social media.

== Contestants ==
The following are the list of confirmed contestants for Miss Diva Supranational 2024 title:

Nu.	Contestant	Age (Note: Ages at the time of the pageant)	Hometown	Placement
1	Ayushree Malik	19	Delhi	Miss Diva Supranational 2025
2	Bagmita Saikia (Note: Winner of Miss North East Diva, a regional Miss Diva sister pageant, placed a direct spot as a finalist at Miss Diva national competition.)	20	Jorhat	
3	Megha Shetty	24	Mumbai	
4	Monika Chaudhary	26	Uttar Pradesh	
5	Soundarya Gowda	28	Hassan	
6	Sreetama Basu	26	Kolkata	
7	Vipra Mehta	21	Udaipur	Miss Diva Cosmo 2025
8	Yogita Rathore	23	Nagothane	Miss Diva Runner-Up

=== Top 20 semi-finalists ===
The following is a list of the top 20 contestants shortlisted from the initial auditions for each category.

- Selected as an official contestant for Miss Diva 2024.
- Chosen as a Wildcard entrant

Miss Diva Beauty Queen
Miss Diva Content Creator
Miss Diva Fashion Designer

Nu.	Delegate	State
1	Akshitha Sathyanarayana	Karnataka
2	Ayushree Malik	Delhi
3	Devshree Hada	Rajasthan
4	Kiran Gulzar	Tamil Nadu
5	Lavanya Grover	Delhi
6	Manishika Goel	Maharashtra
7	Manya Chandra	Delhi
8	Megha Shetty	Maharashtra
9	Mehak Dhingra	Uttar Pradesh
10	Monika Chaudhary	Uttar Pradesh
11	Parinaz Cooper	Maharashtra
12	Priyanshu Mala	Jharkhand
13	Samruddi Shetty	Karnataka
14	Sanjana Gopalakrishnan	Karnataka
15	Simran Jain	Rajasthan
16	Soundarya Gowda	Karnataka
17	Sreetama Basu	Maharashtra
18	Vaishnavi Thakur	Maharashtra
19	Vipra Mehta	Rajasthan
20	Yogita Rathore	Maharashtra

Nu.	Delegate	State
1	Aaditi Mohanty	Delhi
2	Ananya Praveen	Bihar
3	Ankita Tyagi	Uttar Pradesh
4	Beila Gupta	Delhi
5	Chavi Jain	Delhi
6	Eva Joshi	Haryana
7	Jelina Derapi	Delhi
8	Khushi Bhatt	Maharashtra
9	Khushi Chauhan	Haryana
10	Maneesha Saxena	Maharashtra
11	Mansi Agrawal	Maharashtra
12	Muskan Nayyar	Karnataka
13	Nikita Pawar	Maharashtra
14	Palak Shah	Maharashtra
15	Prerna Gupta	Delhi
16	Rhea Kapahi	Delhi
17	Rishita Mitra	Maharashtra
18	Sara Asnani	Karnataka
19	Sarmistha Ghosh	West Bengal
20	Tanumita Ghosh	West Bengal

Nu.	Delegate	State
1	Arohi Vyas	Gujarat
2	Bhumika Joshi	Maharashtra
3	Deeshaa Shriyan	Maharashtra
4	Helly Patel	Rajasthan
5	Ishita Sahoo	Maharashtra
6	Kago Reela	Tamil Nadu
7	Kaviya Kumaran	Tamil Nadu
8	Lipsita Priyadarshini	Odisha
9	Ridhima Tandon	Punjab
10	Rituja Sharma	Delhi
11	Sakshi Nowlakha	Madhya Pradesh
12	Shivranjani Solanki	Madhya Pradesh
13	Shravani Bharad	Maharashtra
14	Shreya Raj	Odisha
15	Shrushti Bhandari	Gujarat
16	Sudhruti Padhiary	Uttar Pradesh
17	Supriya Shimpi	Maharashtra
18	Tanisha Baxi	Gujarat
19	Tanuja Tambwekar	Delhi
20	Veronica James	Maharashtra
