= Julie Tollefsen =

Norwegian beauty queen and fashion designer

- Born: Oslo, Norway
- Occupation: Fashion designer
- Beauty pageant titleholder
- Title: Miss Universe Norway 2023
- Major competitions: Miss Universe Norway 2023; (Winner); Miss Universe 2023; (Unplaced); Miss Supranational 2025; (Unplaced); Miss Charm 2025; (Unplaced)

Julie Tollefsen is a Norwegian fashion designer, and beauty pageant titleholder who won Miss Universe Norway 2023.

== Background ==
=== Early life ===
Julie Tollefsen was born in Oslo. She graduated at École supérieure des arts et techniques de la mode in Oslo in 2017. Between 2015 and 2016, she was enrolled at the School of Fashion Industry in Oslo. In 2019, she trained as a makeup artist for fashion and beauty at Imageakademiet in Oslo. Between August 2021 and November 2021, she was a design assistant at clothing manufacturer ESP in Oslo, from .

In March 2022, she joined fashion retailer, Varner, in Asker, Norway, as a designer.

== Pageantry ==
=== Miss Norway 2023 ===
On August 5, 2023, at 27, Tollefsen represented Oslo and won Miss Norway 2023, competing against 11 other finalists at the Design og arkitektur Norge in Oslo.

=== Miss Universe 2023 ===
Tollefsen represented Norway at Miss Universe 2023 in El Salvador at the Adolfo Pineda National Gymnasium on November 18, 2023. Tollefsen was unplaced, and Sheynnis Palacios of Nicaragua, the winner.

=== Miss Supranational 2025 ===
Tollefsen represented Norway at Miss Supranational 2025 in Poland, at the Strzelecki Park Amphitheater in Nowy Sącz, Poland, on 27 June 2025. Tollefsen was unplaced, and Eduarda Braum of Brazil, the winner.

Awards and achievements
Preceded by Ina Kollset	Miss Supranational Norway; 2025	Succeeded by TBA
Preceded by Ida Anette Hauan	Miss Universe Norway; 2023	Succeeded by Lilly Sødal
