= Puteri Indonesia 2026 =

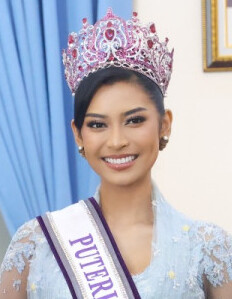
- Agnes Rahajeng
- Date: 24 April 2026
- Presenters: Choky Sitohang; Patricia Gouw
- Entertainment: Adrian Khalif; Anggis Devaki; Arunica
- Theme: From Indonesia to The World
- Venue: Jakarta International Convention Center, Jakarta, Indonesia
- Broadcaster: SCTV; Vidio
- Entrants: 45
- Placements: 16
- Winner: Agnes Rahajeng; Banten

Puteri Indonesia 2026, the 29th edition of the Puteri Indonesia pageant, was held on 24 April 2026 at the Jakarta International Convention Center in Jakarta, Indonesia.

Firsta Yufi Amarta Putri of East Java crowned Agnes Rahajeng of Banten as her successor at the end of the event. This marks Banten's first win at the pageant.

In addition, Puteri Indonesia Lingkungan 2025 Melliza Xaviera of Jakarta SCR 1, Puteri Indonesia Pariwisata 2025 Salma Ranggita of South Sumatra 1, and Puteri Indonesia Pendidikan 2025 Rinanda Maharani of East Kalimantan also crowned their successors Victoria Kosasie from Bali, Karina Moudy Widodo from Jakarta SCR 3, and Gisela Belicia Alma Thesalonica Silalahi from Jakarta SCR 2, respectively.

== Pageant ==
The finale was attended by Miss Supranational 2025 Eduarda Braum of Brazil, Miss International 2025 Catalina Duque of Colombia, Miss Cosmo 2025 Yolina Lindquist of the United States, and Miss Charm 2025 Anna Blanco of Venezuela.

=== Preliminary competition ===
This featured presentations of traditional costumes, talent showcases, and evening gowns. These determined the top 13 semifinalists, alongside closed door interviews with the judges and psychological assesments, with public votes selecting the 14th to 16th slots. It was held on 21 April 2025, at the Kuningan City Grand Ballroom in Jakarta. It was streamed on the UpNow Media YouTube channel, with Jason Sambouw and Ketut Permata Juliastrid as hosts. There were performances by Putri Ariani and Idgitaf, accompanied by Rumah Orkestra Jogja.

==== Selection committee ====
- Putri Kus Wisnu Wardani – chairwoman of the advisory board of Yayasan Puteri Indonesia
- Kusuma Dewi Sutanto – head of organization of Yayasan Puteri Indonesia
- Mega Angkasa – head of communications of Yayasan Puteri Indonesia
- Kusuma Ida Anjani – director of Mustika Ratu, chairwoman of the Puteri Indonesia 2026 selection
- Bernard Permadi – founder of OPPAL
- Kevin Lilliana – Puteri Indonesia Lingkungan 2017 from West Java and Miss International 2017
- Melati Tedja – Puteri Indonesia Pendidikan dan Kebudayaan 2024 from East Java and top six at Miss Charm 2024

=== Final ===
After a speech round, the 16 semifinalists were reduced to six finalists. The question-and-answer round reduced the group to four, an then a final look and final question round determined the winners of Puteri Indonesia, Puteri Indonesia Lingkungan, Puteri Indonesia Pariwisata, and Puteri Indonesia Pendidikan.

==== Selection committee ====
- Kusuma Dewi Sutanto – head of organization of Yayasan Puteri Indonesia
- Mega Angkasa – head of communications of Yayasan Puteri Indonesia
- Kusuma Ida Anjani – director of Mustika Ratu, chairwoman of the Puteri Indonesia 2026 selection
- Harashta Haifa Zahra – Puteri Indonesia 2024 from West Java and Miss Supranational 2024
- Ketut Permata Juliastrid – Puteri Indonesia Pariwisata 2024 from Bali and Miss Cosmo 2024
- Ashanty – singer
- Maman Abdurrahman – Minister of Micro, Small, and Medium Enterprises
- Widiyanti Putri – Minister of Tourism
- Sherly Tjoanda – businesswoman and governor of North Maluku

== Background ==
=== Location and date ===
Puteri Indonesia 2026 final night was on 24 April 2026 at the Jakarta International Convention Center in Jakarta, Indonesia.

=== Selection of participants ===
Five provinces, East Java, South Sulawesi, South Sumatra, West Kalimantan, and West Nusa Tenggara, each hosted a competition to choose their contestants. The remaining contestants were selected through auditions and public voting.

The first audition took place on 3 to 4 February 2026, with twenty-two contestants selected. The second audition took place on 10 to 11 February 2026, with nine contestants selected. Public voting closed on 23 February 2026. Six contestants with the highest number of votes advanced as finalists. The final, and only online audition was held on 24 February 2026, with three contestants selected.

==== Replacements ====
Nungki Andriani Astuti, who was crowned Puteri Indonesia West Nusa Tenggara 2026, resigned her title for an academic reason. She was replaced by her first runner-up, Kieran Puti Paloma Dyonitha.

== Competitions ==
=== Motion Challenge ===
The year's Motion Challenge focused on advocacy and projects owned by the contestants. They were required to explain the advocacy or project they were working on. They must also answer questions from the judges within the given time limit.

The preliminary round of the Motion Challenge was conducted both online and offline, and held privately. The top 21 contestants, 20 selected by the judges and one from the public vote, were chosen from this round.

The final round of the Motion Challenge took place on 14 April 2026 in Wahyu Sihombing Theatre, Ismail Marzuki Park, Jakarta. The 21 contestants who had advanced were required to present their advocacy once more using a similar format, but this time the event was held offline and open to the public. After their presentations, the top 10 contestants were announced. Each of them was then given a motion related to their advocacy and had to explain whether they agreed or disagreed with it. Following that, the judges selected the top five, who responded to questions posed by the judges. Finally, the overall results were announced.

Result	Contestants
Best in Public Speaking	West Java 1 – Graciella Bernadette Julia Mamesah
Best Advocacy	East Kalimantan – Cheryl Lidia Regar

== Results ==
External videos
- Puteri Indonesia 2026 Finals
- Malam Grand Final Puteri Indonesia 2026 by Yayasan Puteri Indonesia & UpNow Media

Puteri Indonesia 2026
Puteri Indonesia Lingkungan 2026
Puteri Indonesia Pariwisata 2026
Puteri Indonesia Pendidikan 2026
Puteri Indonesia Kebudayaan 2026
Puteri Indonesia Inovasi & Teknologi 2026

Placement	Contestant	International Placement
Puteri Indonesia 2026 (Miss Supranational Indonesia 2026)	Banten – Agnes Aditya Rahajeng	Top 12 - Miss Supranational 2026
Puteri Indonesia Lingkungan 2026 (Miss International Indonesia 2026)	Bali – Victoria Veronica Titisari Kosasieputri	TBA - Miss International 2026
Puteri Indonesia Pariwisata 2026 (Miss Cosmo Indonesia 2026)	Jakarta SCR 3 – Karina Moudy Widodo	TBA - Miss Cosmo 2026
Puteri Indonesia Pendidikan 2026 (Miss Charm Indonesia 2026)	Jakarta SCR 2 – Gisela Belicia Alma Thesalonica Silalahi	TBA - Miss Charm 2026
Puteri Indonesia Kebudayaan 2026	North Kalimantan – Nilam Onasis Sahputri	Will not compete in international beauty pageant
Puteri Indonesia Inovasi & Teknologi 2026	Papua – Glorya Stevany Yame Nayoan § Δ	Will not compete in international beauty pageant
Top 16	Central Sulawesi – Lovely Debora Tolembo §; Gorontalo – Angeli Alkatiri Halilovic; Lampung – Agita Nazara; Maluku – Annesha Evangeline Gladiola §; North Sumatra – Natasya Ulibasa Palasa; South Kalimantan – Talitha Fatimah Rahma; South Papua – Luis Sovice Mindayo Mahuze; South Sumatra – Ayu Sulistiani; West Sulawesi 1 – Ade Amanda Susiyanti; West Sumatra 1 – Najwa Putri Cahyani	

Δ – Advanced to the Top 6 via public voting
§ – Advanced to the Top 16 via public voting

=== Special awards ===
Awards	Contestants
Puteri Indonesia Persahabatan (Miss Congeniality)	West Sulawesi 2 – Nadia Sarah Annisa
Kostum Tradisional Terbaik (Best in Traditional Costume)	Banten – Agnes Aditya Rahajeng
Puteri Indonesia Berbakat (Miss Talent)	Bali – Victoria Veronica Titisari Kosasieputri
Puteri Indonesia Intelegensia (Miss Intelligence)	(gold) Bangka Belitung – Aliyah Khansa; (silver) Jakarta SCR 1 – Athalla Hartiana Putri Hardian; (bronze) West Java 2 – Fahira Riva Fauzi
Puteri Indonesia Influencer (Miss Influencer)	Jakarta SCR 1 – Athalla Hartiana Putri Hardian

== Contestants ==
Province	Contestant	Age	Hometown
Sumatra
Aceh	Rahmidawati Aldi	24	Bireun
North Sumatra	Natasya Ulibasa Palasa	26	North Tapanuli
West Sumatra 1	Najwa Putri Cahyani	21	Bukittinggi
West Sumatra 2	Cinta Nurhafidzah	22	Padang
Riau	Prima Yohana	27	Kampar
Riau Islands	Zefanya Yosinta Uli Tobing	19	Batam
Jambi	Dhiya Salsabila Dodi Febri	24	Jambi
Bengkulu	Shania Nabila	23	Kaur
South Sumatra	Ayu Sulistiani	21	Ogan Ilir
Bangka Belitung	Aliyah Khansa	23	West Bangka
Lampung	Agita Nazara	19	Bandar Lampung
Java
Jakarta SCR 1	Athalla Hartiana Putri Hardian	26	Jakarta
Jakarta SCR 2	Gisela Belicia Alma Thesalonica Silalahi	23	Jakarta
Jakarta SCR 3	Karina Moudy Widodo	21	Jakarta
Jakarta SCR 4	Chika Biata Malau	24	Jakarta
Jakarta SCR 5	Vinnidhiaty Gradelyn Jees	25	Jakarta
Jakarta SCR 6	Felita Eleonora	25	Jakarta
Jakarta SCR 7	Scheren Vandrea Sinaulan	25	Jakarta
Banten	Agnes Aditya Rahajeng	26	South Tangerang
West Java 1	Graciella Bernadette Julia Mamesah	19	Bekasi
West Java 2	Fahira Riva Fauzi	22	Bandung
Central Java	Gitta Putri Mardanti	27	Semarang
Yogyakarta SR	Almas Azzahra	25	Yogyakarta
East Java	Rayya Nurrizqinia Haq	22	Jember
Lesser Sunda Islands
Bali	Victoria Veronica Titisari Kosasieputri	26	Badung
West Nusa Tenggara	Kieran Puti Paloma Dyonitha	19	Mataram
East Nusa Tenggara	Melisa Sonia Foris	25	Sikka
Kalimantan
West Kalimantan 1	Anggelia Meryciana	27	Pontianak
West Kalimantan 2	Hilaria Memel	26	Sintang
Central Kalimantan	Farhika Deninta Bungas	19	West Kotawaringin
South Kalimantan	Talitha Fatimah Rahma	24	Banjarmasin
East Kalimantan	Cheryl Lidia Regar	22	Balikpapan
North Kalimantan	Nilam Onasis Sahputri	22	Tarakan
Sulawesi
South Sulawesi 1	Nanda Aprianti Arief	23	Makassar
South Sulawesi 2	Andi Aisyah Anjaliekhan Kilat	25	Makassar
West Sulawesi 1	Ade Amanda Susiyanti	19	Polewali Mandar
West Sulawesi 2	Nadia Sarah Annisa	22	Majene
Southeast Sulawesi	Asri Savira Ria	22	Bombana
Central Sulawesi	Lovely Debora Tolembo	22	Poso
North Sulawesi	Gery Cahyanika Manoarfa	22	Bolaang Mongondow
Gorontalo	Angeli Alkatiri Halilović	20	North Gorontalo
Eastern Indonesia
Maluku	Annesha Evangeline Gladiola	22	Ambon
North Maluku	Safinah Hud	22	Ternate
Papua	Glorya Stevany Yame Nayoan	24	Jayapura
South Papua	Luis Sovice Mindayo Mahuze	25	Merauke
