= Miss Czech Republic 2025 =

14th Miss Czech Republic pageant edition

- Date: 3 May 2025
- Presenters: Ondřej Novotný
- Venue: Forum Karlín, Prague
- Broadcaster: Nova Fun TV
- Entrants: 20
- Placements: 10
- Winner: Linda Górecká; Dětmarovice
- Photogenic: Linda Górecká; Dětmarovice
- Popularity: Monika Kubísková; Prague
- Best Start Up: Adéla Černohousová; Liberec; Karolína Gorylová; Český Těšín

Miss Czech Republic 2025 was the 14th edition of the Miss Czech Republic pageant, held at the Forum Karlín in Prague, Czech Republic, on 18 May 2025. The competition was hosted by Czech football player Ondřej Novotný. Nova Fun TV broadcast the coronation night.

Adéla Štroffeková of Prague crowned Linda Górecká of Dětmarovice as her successor at the end of the event. She represented the Czech Republic at the Miss World 2026 pageant, held in Vietnam.

Representatives for Miss Grand International 2025, Miss International 2025, Miss Earth 2025, Miss Intercontinental 2025, and Miss Supranational 2026, were also crowned at the event. This edition marked the first time the pageant crowned a representative to Miss Earth and the last time it crowned a representative to Miss Intercontinental.

== Results ==
=== Placements: First Stage ===
Color keys

- Declared as winner
- Ended as finalist or runner-up
- Ended as one of the semifinalists
- The contestant did not place.

Placement	Contestant	International placement
Miss Grand Czech Republic 2025	Prague – Markéta Mörwicková	5th Runner-Up – Miss Grand International 2025
Top 5	Dětmarovice – Linda Górecká; Český Těšín – Karolína Gorylová; Brno – Anna Mařáková; Prague – Aylin Saran	

=== Placements: Second Stage ===
Placement	Contestant	International placement
Miss Czech Republic 2025	Dětmarovice – Linda Górecká	Unplaced – Miss World 2026
Miss Supranational Czech Republic 2025	Český Těšín – Karolína Gorylová	4th Runner-Up – Miss Supranational 2026
Miss International Czech Republic 2025	Prague – Simona Procházková	Unplaced – Miss International 2025
Miss Earth Czech Republic 2025	Prague – Natálie Puškinová	Winner – Miss Earth 2025
Miss Intercontinental Czech Republic 2025	Brno – Anna Mařáková	Top 23 – Miss Intercontinental 2025
Top 9	Liberec – Sára Aubrechtová; Liberec – Adéla Černohousová; Prague – Aylin Saran; Prague – Monika Kubísková	

=== Special awards ===
Award	Winner
Best Start Up	Liberec – Adéla Černohousová; Český Těšín – Karolína Gorylová
Miss Photogenic	Dětmarovice – Linda Górecká
Miss Popularity	Prague – Monika Kubísková
Top Model	Prague – Aylin Saran

== Contestants ==
The following are the 20 official contestants:

Contestants	Age (Note: Ages at the time of the pageant.)	City	Placements
Sára Aubrechtová	18	Liberec	Semifinal (Top 10)
Simona Procházková	25	Prague	Semifinal (Top 10)
Linda Górecká	21	Dětmarovice	Semifinal (Top 10)
Adéla Černohousová	23	Liberec	Semifinal (Top 10)
Markéta Mörwicková	21	Prague	Semifinal (Top 10)
Karolína Gorylová	26	Český Těšín	Semifinal (Top 10)
Aylin Saran	26	Prague	Semifinal (Top 10)
Anna Mařáková	21	Brno	Semifinal (Top 10)
Monika Kubísková	26	Prague	Semifinal (Top 10)
Natálie Puškinová	21	Prague	Semifinal (Top 10)
Barbara Plintová	22	Třinec	Eliminated (Top 14)
Hana Cermanová	23	Liberec	Eliminated (Top 14)
Leona Mrňáková	21	Prague	Eliminated (Top 14)
Glenda Fopp	20	Liberec	Eliminated (Top 14)
Karolína Šmelková	25	Olomouc	Eliminated (Top 16)
Victoria Nguyen	20	Prague	Eliminated (Top 16)
Lucie Kubešová	22	Jesenice	Eliminated (Top 18)
Natalia Al-Imam	24	Prague	Eliminated (Top 18)
Natalie Peckova	23	Prague	Eliminated (Top 20)
Alžběta Křížová	18	Hradec Králové	Eliminated (Top 20)
