= Avni Gupta =

Indian beauty pageant title holder

- Beauty pageant titleholder
- Title: Miss Diva Supranational Miss supra india 2026
- Years active: 2024–present
- Major competitions: Miss Universe Delhi 2025 (1st runner up); Miss Diva 2025 (Winner); Miss Supranational 2026 (Top 12)

Avni Gupta is an Indian model and beauty pageant titleholder who was crowned Miss Diva Supranational 2025... She represented India at Miss Supranational 2026, held in Poland, where she advanced to the Top 12, continuing India's streak of semifinal placements at the international pageant. Prior to entering pageantry, Gupta worked as an auditor before pursuing modelling full-time.

== Early life and career ==
Avni Gupta is from Agra, Uttar Pradesh, India. Before entering the beauty pageant industry, she worked as an auditor at Deloitte. In interviews, Gupta has stated that she left her corporate career to pursue modelling and pageantry, describing the decision as the fulfilment of a childhood aspiration to represent India on the international stage. She subsequently began participating in fashion shoots and runway assignments before competing in national beauty pageants. Her transition from finance to pageantry has been highlighted by several Indian media outlets as an unconventional career shift.

== Pageantry ==
=== Miss Diva 2025 ===
Gupta competed in Miss Diva 2025, the national beauty pageant that selected India's representatives for Miss Supranational 2026 and Miss Cosmo 2026. At the conclusion of the competition, she was crowned Miss Diva Supranational 2025, succeeding Ayushree Malik. The title earned her the right to represent India at the Miss Supranational 2026 pageant in Poland.

=== Miss Supranational 2026 ===
As Miss Supranational India 2026, Gupta represented India at the Miss Supranational 2026 pageant, held in Małopolska, Poland. During the competition, she placed as a semi finalist for the Supra Chat and Supra Influencer challenges, and later qualified for the Top 24 at the final competition. She concluded the competition as a Top 12 finalist

Awards and achievements
| Preceded by Ayushree Malik | Miss Diva Supranational; 2026 | Succeeded by Incumbent |
