= Karina Moudy Widodo =

Indonesian beauty pageant titleholder

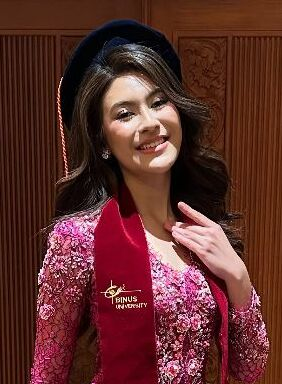
- Widodo in 2026
- Education: BINUS University; Universitas Islam Sultan Agung
- Beauty pageant titleholder
- Title: Puteri Indonesia Pariwisata 2026; Miss Cosmo Indonesia 2026
- Major competitions: Puteri Indonesia 2026; (2nd Runner-up – Puteri Indonesia Pariwisata 2025); Miss Cosmo 2026; (TBD)

Karina Moudy Widodo is an Indonesian model, actor and beauty pageant titleholder, who won Puteri Indonesia Pariwisata 2026. She represented DKI Jakarta 3 at the Puteri Indonesia 2026 competition and will represent Indonesia at Miss Cosmo 2026, which will be held in Khánh Hòa on January 16, 2027.

== Early life ==
Moudy completed her secondary education at SMA Negeri 1 Pati in 2022. Afterwards moving to Jakarta, where she majored in Mass Communication at Bina Nusantara University. She also studied law at Sultan Agung Islamic University.

In 2026, she appeared in the horror-comedy film Sekawan Limo 2: Gunung Klawih, scheduled for release on May 27, 2026.

Moudy founded the Young Innovators movement, a learning platform with a long-term commitment to building character, discipline, and compassion in the younger generation.

== Pageantry ==
In 2022, Moudy won her first Tourism Ambassador competition, against 55 other contestants, while in 12th grade. She became the Pati District Cultural Ambassador for 2022. She then represented Pati district. and was first runner-up at Puteri Otonomi Indonesia 2023. In 2024, She was first runner-up at Abang None Jakarta, and first runner-up of Central Jakarta. She represented DKI Jakarta 3, and won Puteri Indonesia Pariwisata 2026, held in the Main Hall of the Jakarta International Convention Center on April 24, 2025. Moudy was crowned by her predecessor Salma Ranggita Cahyariyani. On May 4, 2026, It was announced that she would represent Indonesia at Miss Cosmo 2026.

== Film ==
Year	Film	Role	Note
2026	Sekawan Limo 2: Gunung Klawih	Icha	Debut
2026	Landasan	Damar's Wife	

Awards and achievements
Preceded by Salma Ranggita Cahyariyani	Puteri Indonesia Pariwisata; 2026	Succeeded by Incumbent
Preceded by Sarah Sentoso	Puteri Indonesia Jakarta SCR 3; 2026	Succeeded by Incumbent
