= Ayushree Malik =

Indian model, dancer and beauty pageant titleholder (born 2005)

- Born: Delhi, India
- Education: Delhi University
- Height: 1.78 m (5 ft 10 in)
- Beauty pageant titleholder
- Title: Miss Supranational India 2025
- Major competitions: Miss Diva 2024; (Winner – Miss Supranational India 2025); Miss Supranational 2025; (Top 24)

Ayushree Malik is an Indian beauty pageant titleholder who was crowned Miss Supranational India 2025. She represented India at the Miss Supranational 2025 competition in Poland and placed in Top 24 by winning the Supra Chat challenge.

She was also a participant in Femina Miss India 2024, where she was one of the Top 5 regional finalists from Bihar and Uttar Pradesh.

== Pageantry ==
=== Miss Diva 2024 ===
On 27 January 2025, Ayushree was named one of the Top 20 initially shortlisted candidates for the Miss Diva Beauty Queen 2024 title at the Miss Diva 2024 competition. She later advanced to the Top 8 finalists. On the grand finale held on 7 March 2025, at The LaLit in Mumbai, she won the title of Miss Diva Supranational 2025. She was crowned by Andrea Aguilera, Miss Supranational 2023 from Ecuador, alongside Ritika Khatnani, Miss Supranational India 2022. During the competition, Ayushree also won the Miss Body Beautiful subtitle.

=== Miss Supranational 2025 ===
Malik went on to represent India at Miss Supranational 2025 in Nowy Sącz, Poland. She advanced to the Top 24 finalists. She won the title of Supra Chat Challenge.

Awards and achievements
Preceded by Sonal Kukreja	Miss Diva Supranational; 2025	Succeeded by Avni Gupta
