= Vipra Mehta =

Indian actress and beauty pageant titleholder

- Born: India
- Occupation: Actress
- Beauty pageant titleholder
- Title: Miss Cosmo India 2025
- Major competitions: Miss Diva 2024; (Winner – Miss Cosmo India 2025); Miss Cosmo 2025; (Top 21)

Vipra Mehta (Hindi: विप्रा मेहता) is an Indian actress and beauty pageant titleholder. She won Miss Cosmo India 2025 at Miss Diva 2024 on 7 March 2025 in Mumbai. Mehta represented India at Miss Cosmo 2025, which was held in Vietnam on 20 December 2025 where she finished as Top 21.

== Pageantry ==
=== Miss Universal Grand India 2023 ===
Mehta won Miss Universe Grand India 2023, on 26 October 2023 in Bangalore, against 31 other contestants.

=== Miss Diva 2024 ===
On 27 January 2025, Mehta was shortlisted as a top 20 contestant for Miss Diva Beauty Queen 2024, at Miss Diva 2024. She reached the top eight as a wildcard entrant.

On the grand finale held on 7 March 2025, at The LaLit in Mumbai, Mehta won the title of Miss Diva Cosmo 2025. She was crowned by Miss Cosmo 2024 Ketut Permata Juliastrid, from Indonesia.

=== Miss Cosmo 2025 ===
Mehta represented India at Miss Cosmo 2025, which took place in late 2025 in Vietnam where she placed among the Top 21 finalists.

== Film ==
Mehta appeared in the movie Kesar Kasturi (2021).

Awards and achievements
Preceded by Rajashree Dowarah	Miss Cosmo India; 2025	Succeeded by Avani Kakekochhi
