= Agnes Rahajeng =

Indonesian beauty pageant titleholder (born 2000)

- ꦄꦒ꧀ꦤꦺꦱ꧀ ꦄꦢꦶꦠ꧀ꦪ ꦫꦲꦗꦺꦤ꧀ꦒ꧀}
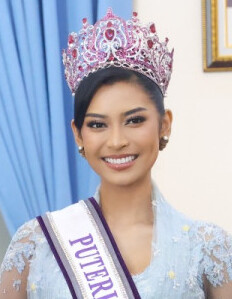
- Rahajeng in 2026
- Born: Agnes Aditya Rahajeng; January 13, 2000 (age 26); United States
- Education: Pelita Harapan University
- Relatives: Maria Rahajeng
- Beauty pageant titleholder
- Title: Puteri Indonesia 2026; Miss Supranational Indonesia 2026
- Major competitions: Puteri Indonesia 2026; (Winner); Miss Supranational 2026; (Top 12); (Miss Supranational Asia & Oceania)

Agnes Aditya Rahajeng (Note: Javanese: ꦄꦒ꧀ꦤꦺꦱ꧀ ꦄꦢꦶꦠ꧀ꦪ ꦫꦲꦗꦺꦤ꧀ꦒ꧀) (born January 13, 2000) is an Indonesian beauty pageant titleholder who won Puteri Indonesia 2026.

== Background and education ==
Agnes Aditya Rahajeng was born on January 13, 2000, in the United States. Her sister is Miss Indonesia 2014 Maria Rahajeng. Rahajeng studied Communication Science at Pelita Harapan University.

== Pageantry ==
=== Puteri Indonesia Banten 2026 ===
In 2026, Agnes entered and won Puteri Indonesia Banten 2026, representing Banten. She originally represented Central Java, but was reassigned.

=== Puteri Indonesia 2026 ===
Agnes won Puteri Indonesia 2026, held at the Plenary Hall of the Jakarta International Convention Center in Central Jakarta on April 24, 2026. During the preliminary and quarantine period, Rahajeng received four special awards, Best Traditional Costume, Best Profile Video, Best Catwalk, and Best Makeup. She was crowned by her predecessor, Firsta Yufi from East Java. This was the first time Banten Province had won the competition.

=== Miss Supranational 2026 ===
Agnes represented Indonesia at Miss Supranational 2026 on July 31, 2026 held in Poland, and reached the top 12. She was awarded the title of Miss Supranational Asia and Oceania.

== Acting ==
Agnes made her acting debut in the film Heartbreak Motel (2024).

== Notes ==
Awards and achievements
| Preceded by Firsta Yufi | Miss Supranational Asia & Oceania; 2026 | Succeeded by Incumbent |
| Preceded by Firsta Yufi (East Java) | Miss Supranational Indonesia; 2026 | Succeeded by Incumbent |
| Preceded by Firsta Yufi (East Java) | Puteri Indonesia; 2026 | Succeeded by Incumbent |
| Preceded by Syafira Mardhiyah | Puteri Indonesia Banten; 2026 | Succeeded by Incumbent |
