= Miss Japan 2019 =

45th annual Miss Japan competition

- Date: September 11, 2019
- Broadcaster: YouTube
- Entrants: 42
- Placements: 16
- Winner: Honoka Tsuchiya; Tokyo

Miss Japan 2019 (Japanese: 2019 ミス・ジャパン) was the 45th edition of the Miss Japan pageant. It was held on September 11, 2019. The winner was Honoka Tsuchiya of Tokyo Prefecture. This is the first edition of the Miss Japan pageant under the HDR corporation, who started the pageant after the HDR corporation lost the franchises to Miss Universe and Miss Earth. Representatives from 42 out of the 47 prefectures of Japan competed at the pageant.

== Results ==
=== Placements ===
Final results	Contestant
Miss Japan 2019	Tokyo - Honoka Tsuchiya
1st Runner-Up	Aichi - Yuka Shintake
2nd Runner-Up	Mie - Chiaki Owaki
3rd Runner-Up	Osaka - Moeka Horie
4th Runner-Up	Oita - Haruka Yamashita
Top 16	Akita - Miho Otsuka; Chiba - Lara Negishi; Ehime - Shiori Fujita; Fukushima - Nana Takahashi; Gifu - Aya Ohno; Hiroshima - Aya Kawasaki; Hokkaido - Rina Mitsuya; Nagasaki - Haruka Koyanagi; Okayama - Yuki Sorasaki; Toyama - Haruka Kato; Yamanashi - Mizuki Kato

== Contestants ==
42 contestants competed:

Prefecture	Candidate	Japanese name	Age
Aichi	Yuka Shintake	新竹 由佳	20
Akita	Miho Otsuka	大塚 美帆	25
Aomori	Miu Inoue	井上 美羽	19
Chiba	Lara Negishi	根岸 らら	24
Ehime	Shiori Fujita	藤田 栞	26
Fukui	Riko Hasegawa	長谷川 莉子	24
Fukuoka	Mayu Fukuyama	福山 真由	21
Fukushima	Nana Takahashi	高橋 奈那	25
Gifu	Aya Ohno	大野 彩	25
Gunma	Marise Hayase	早瀬 茉里美	27
Hiroshima	Aya Kawasaki	川崎 彩	25
Hokkaido	Rina Mitsuya	三津谷 里奈	27
Hyōgo	Saki Hagiyama	萩山 沙貴	25
Ibaraki	Chisato Komatsuzaki	小松崎 ちさと	27
Ishikawa	Risa Nishitaki	西瀧 理紗	27
Iwate	Kanako Nakano	中野 加奈子	23
Kagawa	Mako Matsumoto	松本 茉子	26
Kagoshima	Ai Kitagawa	北川 あい	24
Kochi	Aika Taka	高 絢一果	20
Mie	Chiaki Owaki	大脇 千明	26
Miyagi	Ayano Kubo	久保 彩乃	19
Miyazaki	Ami Nakano	中野 愛美	25
Nagano	Misa Tisaoka	立岡 三沙	25
Nagasaki	Haruka Koyanagi	小柳 春花	19
Nara	Momoka Kawakami	川上 もも香	19
Niigata	Sagiri Kobayashi	小林 沙霧	26
Oita	Haruka Yamashita	山下 遥香	23
Okayama	Yuki Sorasaki	空先 有紀	26
Okinawa	Maria Matsunaga	松永 麻莉亜	24
Osaka	Moeka Horie	堀江 萌花	19
Saitama	Moka Kakumoto	角元 百花	22
Shiga	Saori Komori	小森 沙織	26
Shimane	Aki Tamaki	玉城 亜樹	21
Shizuoka	Sayaka Akiyama	秋山 沙也香	27
Tochigi	Chihiro Mori	毛利 千紘	25
Tokushima	Erina Awai	粟井 絵里奈	23
Tokyo	Honoka Tsuchiya	土屋 炎伽	26
Toyama	Haruka Kato	加藤 遥香	24
Wakayama	Nene Taniguchi	谷口 寧々	24
Yamagata	Saki Nakabayashi	中林 沙妃	24
Yamaguchi	Shoko Nishida	西田 祥子	22
Yamanashi	Mizuki Kato	加藤 瑞生	21

== Notes ==
=== Did not compete ===
- Kanagawa
- Saitama
- Kumamoto
- Kyoto
- Saga
- Tottori
