= Miss Supranational 2026 =

17th Miss Supranational pageant

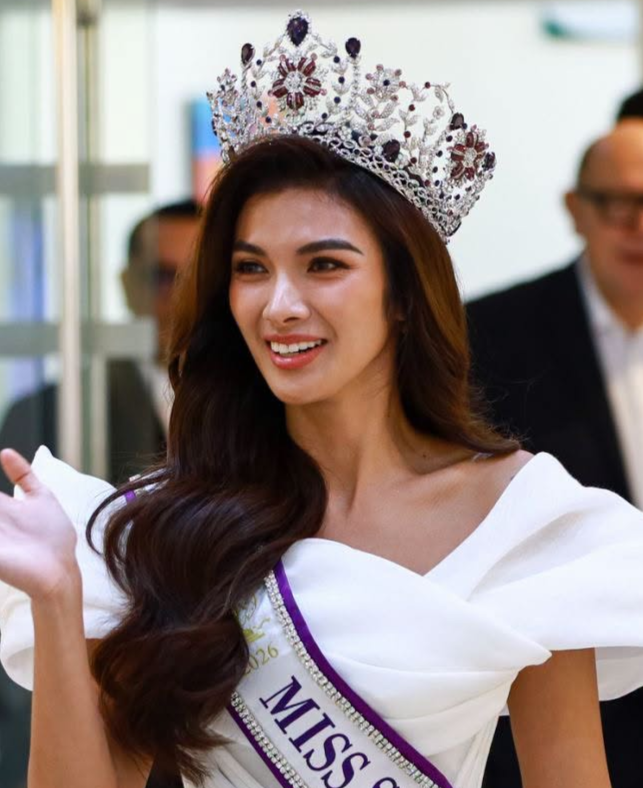
- Katrina Llegado
- Date: 31 July 2026
- Presenters: Ida Nowakowska; Fezile Mkhize; Justýna Zedníková; Kasandra Zawal
- Entertainment: Alicja Szemplińska; Blanka; Oktavvia
- Venue: Strzelecki Park Amphitheater, Nowy Sącz, Lesser Poland, Poland
- Broadcaster: Polsat; Zoom; GEN; Venevisión; YouTube
- Entrants: 67
- Placements: 24
- Debuts: Bahrain; British Virgin Islands; Tanzania; United Arab Emirates
- Withdrawals: Angola; Argentina; Cayman Islands; Colombia; Democratic Republic of the Congo; Estonia; Haiti; Kyrgyzstan; Malaysia; New Zealand; Nicaragua; Togo; Trinidad and Tobago; Ukraine; United States Virgin Islands
- Returns: Bonaire; China; Côte d'Ivoire; France; Ghana; Gibraltar; Italy; Moldova; Pakistan; Paraguay; Sierra Leone; Singapore
- Winner: Katrina Llegado; Philippines
- Congeniality: Sadia Nagatori, Japan
- Photogenic: Eve Gilles, France

Miss Supranational 2026 was the 17th edition of the Miss Supranational pageant, held on 31 July 2026 at Strzelecki Park Amphitheater in Nowy Sącz, Lesser Poland, Poland.

At the end of the event, Eduarda Braum of Brazil crowned Katrina Llegado of the Philippines as her successor at the end of the event, marking the country's second victory in the pageant's history after 13 years.

== Background ==
=== Location and date ===
The 17th edition of Miss Supranational will be held at the Strzelecki Park Amphitheater in Nowy Sącz, with the final night scheduled for 31 July 2026.

=== Selection of participants ===
Beginning with this contest, contestants who have previously competed in the pageant will be eligible to compete again after a two-year period. The organization will also accept divorced women and mothers, provided that they are not married.

Kanyalak Nookaew of Thailand withdrew from the competition after her national organization dethroned her, citing serious rule violations. However, she later rejoined the competition after the matter was resolved between her and the organization.

==== Replacements ====
Michelle Calderón of Guatemala withdrew from the competition due to health issues and was replaced by Elizabeth Blanco. McKinley Farese, who was originally selected to represent the United States, stepped down for personal reasons while retaining her national title. She was subsequently replaced by Marley Stokes. Andrea Alegria of Peru had her title removed as she was unable to fulfill her duties and was replaced by María Paula Fierro.

==== Debuts, returns, and withdrawals ====
This edition will mark the debut of Bahrain, the British Virgin Islands, Tanzania, and the United Arab Emirates. And will feature the returns of Bonaire, which last competed in 2011; Moldova, last competed in 2018; China, France and Singapore, which last competed in 2022; and Côte d'Ivoire, Gibraltar, Italy, Pakistan, Paraguay and Sierra Leone, which last competed in 2024.

Sophie Pardington of New Zealand withdrew from the competition due to health reasons.

Additionally, some contestants who had appeared in the SupraChat Challenge also withdrew for unknown reasons, including Linasni Kusraju of Malaysia, Sandeepa Sewmini of Sri Lanka, Noémy Chevallier of Guadeloupe, and Alma Obama of Equatorial Guinea.

== Results ==
=== Placements ===
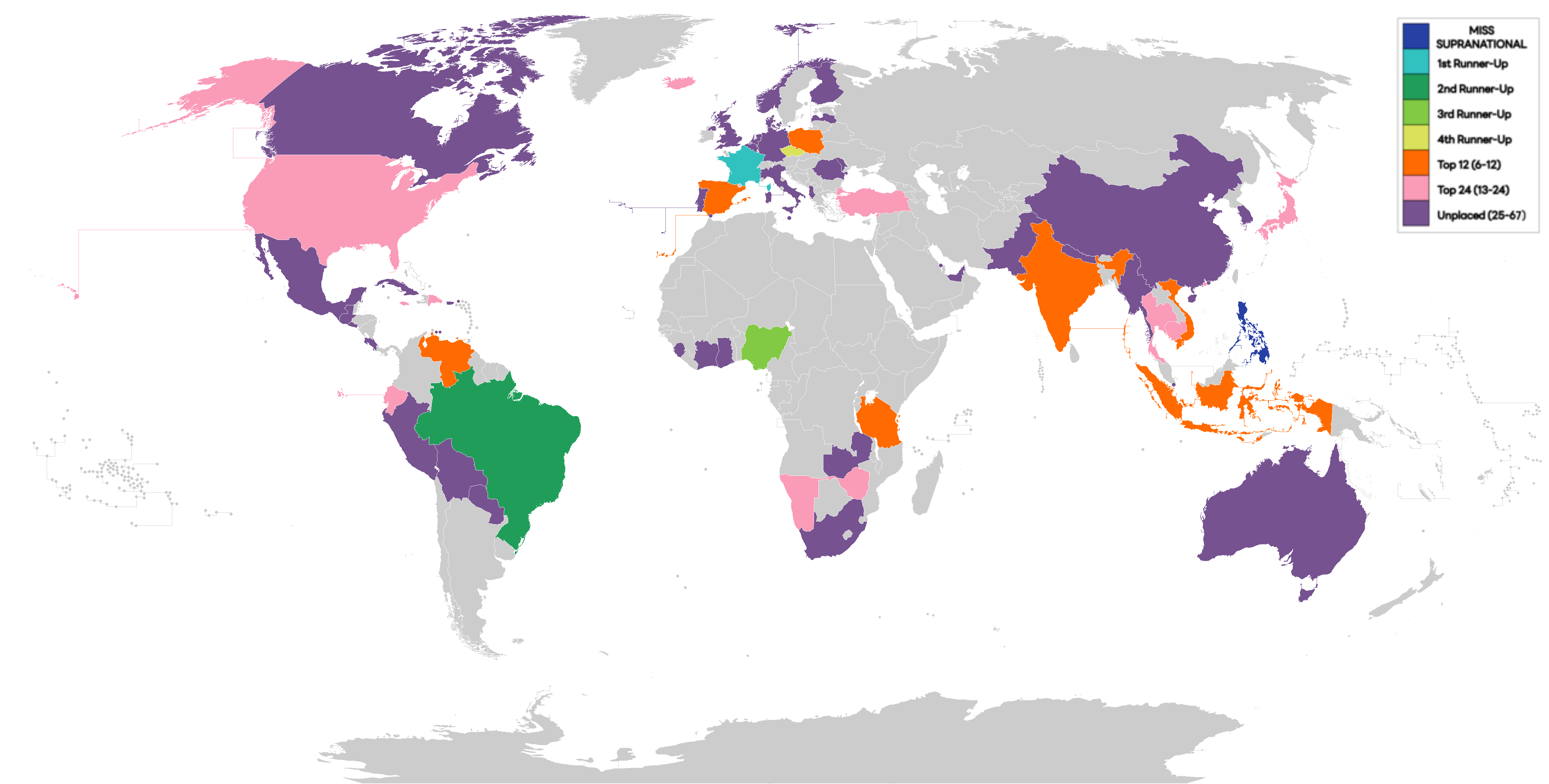
Miss Supranational 2026 participating countries and territories

| Placement | Contestant |
|---|---|
| Miss Supranational 2026 | Philippines – Katrina Llegado |
| 1st Runner-Up | France – Eve Gilles |
| 2nd Runner-Up | Brazil – Lara Marina |
| 3rd Runner-Up | Nigeria – Ndah Eno |
| 4th Runner-Up | Czech Republic – Karolína Gorylová |
| Top 12 | India – Avni Gupta; Indonesia – Agnes Rahajeng; Poland – Oliwia Mikulska; Spain – Nelly Mestre; Tanzania – Tracy Nabukeera; Venezuela – Silvia Maestre; Vietnam – Mai Ngô ☆ |
| Top 24 | Cambodia – Sarytola Hok Δ; Dominican Republic — Nicole Hernández; Ecuador – Kika Marques; Iceland – Hrafnhildur Haraldsdóttir; Jamaica – Rasheda Green; Japan – Sadia Nagatori; Macau – Luiyu Li Δ; Namibia – Cassia Sharpley Δ; Thailand – Kanyalak Nookaew; Turkey – İlayda Güvenç; United States – Marley Stokes Δ; Zimbabwe – Nicole Nyawera |

- ☆ – placed into the Top 12 by fan-voting challenge
- Δ – placed into the Top 24 by fast-track challenges

=== Continental Titleholders ===
The award was presented to representatives who achieved the highest ranking within the continent or region, excluding those in the Top 5.

| Continent/Region | Contestant |
|---|---|
| Africa | Tanzania – Tracy Nabukeera |
| Americas | Venezuela – Silvia Maestre |
| Asia and Oceania | Indonesia – Agnes Rahajeng |
| Caribbean | Jamaica – Rasheda Green |
| Europe | Poland – Oliwia Mikulska |

== Pageants ==
The pageant was hosted by Ida Nowakowska and Mister Supranational 2024 Fezile Mkhize. The event featured performances by Alicja Szemplińska, Blanka, and Oktavvia.

== Challenge events ==
=== Supra Chat ===
The Supra Chat event commenced in 13 June 2026, and was broadcast via the official YouTube channel of Miss Supranational. Each participant had the opportunity to introduce themselves to a gathering comprising six to seven individuals. Individuals from ten groups were selected to advance to the final round of the competition.

==== First Round ====
- Winner to the semi-final.
- Wildcard to the semi-final.

| Group | Country/Territory | | | | | | |
| Group | 1 | 2 | 3 | 4 | 5 | 6 | 7 |
|---|---|---|---|---|---|---|---|
| 1 | Australia | Bahrain | Curaçao | Japan | Netherlands | Romania | Venezuela |
| 2 | Belgium | Canada | Gibraltar | India | Mexico | Nigeria | Peru |
| 3 | Albania | Costa Rica | Czech Republic | Germany | Myanmar | Spain | United States |
| 4 | Brazil | Finland | Malta | Pakistan | Portugal | ~~Sri Lanka~~ | United Kingdom |
| 5 | Bolivia | Bonaire | Cambodia | Dominican Republic | Namibia | Norway | Philippines |
| 6 | Cuba | Ecuador | Indonesia | Poland | Puerto Rico | Sierra Leone | Thailand |
| 7 | British Virgin Islands | Guatemala | Moldova | Paraguay | Turkey | Vietnam | Zambia |
| 8 | China | Iceland | ~~Malaysia~~ | Nepal | South Africa | Tanzania | Zimbabwe |
| 9 | Côte d'Ivoire | El Salvador | ~~Equatorial Guinea~~ | France | Hong Kong | Singapore | —N/a |
| 10 | Denmark | Ghana | Jamaica | Latvia | Macau | South Korea | —N/a |

==== Semi Final Round ====
- Advanced to the final round.

| Group | Country/Territory | | | | | | |
| Group | 1 | 2 | 3 | 4 | 5 | 6 | 7 |
|---|---|---|---|---|---|---|---|
| 1 | Australia | Canada | Curaçao | Czech Republic | India | Namibia | United Kingdom |
| 2 | France | Guatemala | Indonesia | Jamaica | Singapore | Tanzania | Zambia |

==== Final round ====
- Advanced to the Top 24 via Supra Chat.

| Results | Country |
|---|---|
| Winner | Namibia – Cassia Sharpley |
| Top 7 | Canada – Arshdeep Thind; France – Eve Gilles; Indonesia – Agnes Rahajeng; Jamaica – Rasheda Green; Tanzania – Tracy Nabukeera; United Kingdom – Niamh Taylor |

=== Supra Model of the Year ===
- Advanced to the Top 24 via Supra Model of the Year.

| Placement | | Contestant |
|---|---|---|
| Winner | Asia and Oceania | Macau – Luiyu Li |
| Continental; Winners | Africa | Zambia – Eutray Simwatachela |
| Continental; Winners | Americas | Brazil – Lara Marina |
| Continental; Winners | Caribbean | Dominican Republic – Nicole Hernández |
| Continental; Winners | Europe | Turkey – İlayda Güvenç |
| Semi-Finalists | Jamaica – Rasheda Green; Spain – Nelly Mestre; Thailand – Kanyalak Nookaew; Venezuela — Silvia Maestre; Zimbabwe — Nicole Nyawera | |

== Contestants ==
The delegates are as follows:

| Country/Territory | Contestant | Age | Hometown | Continent | Ref. |
|---|---|---|---|---|---|
| Albania | Natalia Lalaj | 23 | Tirana | Europe | |
| Australia | Rebecca Shandley | 28 | Sydney | Oceania | |
| Bahrain | Advaita Shetty | 31 | Manama | Asia | |
| Belgium | Calistee Kalaycioglu | 20 | Antwerp | Europe | |
| Bolivia | Eugenia Redin | 24 | Santa Cruz | Americas | |
| Bonaire | I-Shilah Benita | 22 | Kralendijk | Caribbean | |
| Brazil | Lara Marina | 19 | Afonso Cláudio | Americas | |
| British Virgin Islands | Deyounce Lowenfield | 22 | Tortola | Caribbean | |
| Cambodia | Sarytola Hok | 22 | Battambang | Asia | |
| Canada | Arshdeep Thind | 24 | Abbotsford | Americas | |
| China | Yuanxi Qi | 26 | Shanghai | Asia | |
| Costa Rica | Fiorella Araya | 23 | Heredia | Americas | |
| Côte d'Ivoire | Lisa Konan | 26 | Bingerville | Africa | |
| Cuba | Lianeth Aguilera | 26 | Havana | Caribbean | |
| Curaçao | Veronica Pichardo | 23 | Willemstad | Caribbean | |
| Czech Republic | Karolína Gorylová | 27 | Český Těšín | Europe | |
| Denmark | Samantha Jensen | 26 | Copenhagen | Europe | |
| Dominican Republic | Nicole Hernández | 23 | Hermanas Mirabal | Caribbean | |
| Ecuador | Kika Marques | 29 | Guayaquil | Americas | |
| El Salvador | Argelia Rodríguez | 27 | San Salvador | Americas | |
| Finland | Selja Kolu | 22 | Lahti | Europe | |
| France | Eve Gilles | 23 | Quaëdypre | Europe | |
| Germany | Andromeda Schuster | 21 | Berlin | Europe | |
| Ghana | Naa Asheley Nartey | 26 | Accra | Africa | |
| Gibraltar | Ashlyn Gonzalez | 23 | Gibraltar | Europe | |
| Guatemala | Elizabeth Blanco | 29 | Jutiapa | Americas | |
| Hong Kong | Yuying Zhang | 23 | Hong Kong | Asia | |
| Iceland | Hrafnhildur Haraldsdóttir | 22 | Reykjavík | Europe | |
| India | Avni Gupta | 22 | Agra | Asia | |
| Indonesia | Agnes Rahajeng | 26 | Blora | Asia | |
| Italy | Morena Teti | 28 | Lanciano | Europe | |
| Jamaica | Rasheda Green | 23 | Saint Thomas | Caribbean | |
| Japan | Sadia Nagatori | 25 | Tokyo | Asia | |
| Latvia | Anastasija Aleksejevska | 27 | Riga | Europe | |
| Macau | Luiyu Li | 21 | Macau | Asia | |
| Malta | Shannah Rapa | 25 | Swieqi | Europe | |
| Mexico | Sofía Zamora | 28 | Colima | Americas | |
| Moldova | Olga Guțanu | 25 | Ungheni | Europe | |
| Myanmar | Zin Moe Pyae | 25 | Pyay | Asia | |
| Namibia | Cassia Sharpley | 26 | Windhoek | Africa | |
| Nepal | Purnima Karki | 24 | Katari | Asia | |
| Netherlands | Selina Rakké | 24 | Utrecht | Europe | |
| Nigeria | Ndah Eno | 18 | Akwa Ibom | Africa | |
| Norway | Chelsea Victoria Sand | 22 | Oslo | Europe | |
| Pakistan | Azqa Sohail | 30 | Rawalpindi | Asia | |
| Paraguay | Cecilia Romero | 22 | Caazapá | Americas | |
| Peru | María Paula Fierro | 25 | Lima | Americas | |
| Philippines | Katrina Llegado | 28 | Taguig | Asia | |
| Poland | Oliwia Mikulska | 20 | Żary | Europe | |
| Portugal | Sabrina Gladio | 31 | Lisbon | Europe | |
| Puerto Rico | Leedanis Ortiz | 23 | Coamo | Caribbean | |
| Romania | Luiza Mocanu | 23 | Piatra Neamț | Europe | |
| Sierra Leone | Lachaeveh Davies | 26 | Freetown | Africa | |
| Singapore | Lucy Lu | 24 | Singapore | Asia | |
| South Africa | Shannon Benting | 30 | Northcliff | Africa | |
| South Korea | Yoonjeong Lee | 25 | Seoul | Asia | |
| Spain | Nelly Mestre | 21 | Palencia | Europe | |
| Tanzania | Tracy Nabukeera | 23 | Dar es Salaam | Africa | |
| Thailand | Kanyalak Nookaew | 26 | Pathum Thani | Asia | |
| Turkey | İlayda Güvenç | 22 | Ankara | Europe | |
| United Arab Emirates | Polli Cannabis | 29 | Minsk | Asia | |
| United Kingdom | Niamh Taylor | 28 | Kirkby | Europe | |
| United States | Marley Stokes | 28 | Lexington | Americas | |
| Venezuela | Silvia Maestre | 28 | Santa María de Ipire | Americas | |
| Vietnam | Mai Ngô | 30 | Ho Chi Minh City | Asia | |
| Zambia | Eutray Simwatachela | 27 | Kalomo | Africa | |
| Zimbabwe | Nicole Nyawera | 26 | Mutare | Africa | |
