= Natálie Puškinová =

Czech model and beauty queen (born 2004)

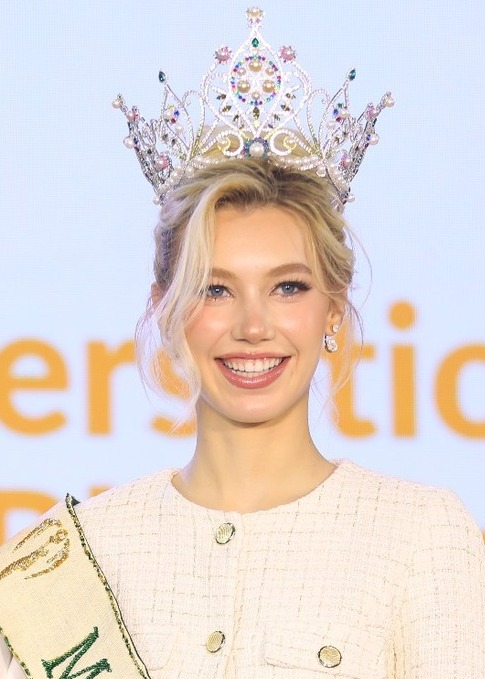
- Puškinová in 2025
- Born: 14 February 2004 (age 22); Brno, Czech Republic
- Education: Charles University
- Height: 178 cm (5 ft 10 in)
- Beauty pageant titleholder
- Title: Miss Earth Czech Republic 2025; Miss Earth 2025
- Major competitions: Miss Czech Republic 2025; (Winner – Miss Earth Czech Republic 2025); Miss Earth 2025; (Winner)

Natálie Puškinová (Czech pronunciation: [ˈnataːlɪjɛ ˈpuʃkɪnovaː]; born 14 February 2004) is a Czech beauty pageant titleholder who won Miss Earth 2025. She is the second Czech woman to win the Miss Earth title.

== Early life and education ==
Puškinová lives in the village of Brnky, located just outside of Prague. Some of her ancestors originate from Russia, but her parents were already born in the Czech Republic. Growing up, her family raised chickens and maintained a mini-farm at home. At the age of sixteen, her father died and she lived with her mother and aunt.

She has worked in the theatre cafe industry and has held various administrative positions. Additionally, she has done some modeling work and completed an internship at Vogue. Puškinová studies marketing and public relations at Charles University.

== Pageantry ==
=== Miss Czech Republic 2025 ===
On 3 May 2025, Puškinová finished in the top six of the competition and was crowned Miss Earth Czech Republic 2025.

=== Miss Earth 2025 ===
Puškinová, representing the Czech Republic, won Miss Earth 2025 on 5 November at Okada Manila in the Philippines. She was crowned by the outgoing titleholder, Jessica Lane of Australia, after competing against over 77 contestants. Puškinová is the second Czech woman to win this title, following Tereza Fajksová, who was crowned Miss Earth in 2012.

During the final question-and-answer portion, when asked whether she agreed with Bill Gates' view that resources should be redirected from fighting climate change to addressing disease and hunger, Puškinová declined to choose between tackling environmental issues and social problems like disease and hunger. She emphasized that these challenges are interconnected and impact everyone globally. She believes that unity is essential in solving both climate change and hunger simultaneously.

In addition, during the talent competition in the pre-pageant activities, Puškinová also won a gold medal in her group for reciting a Tagalog poem.

== Media and environmental activism ==
As a certified scuba diver, Puškinová advocates protecting and conserving the ocean. She also aims to reduce food waste and its environmental impacts through her "from plate to planet" initiative. Additionally, Puškinová is pursuing youth environmental action with her mini academy. The youth-led European Solidarity Corps program offers workshops to inspire sustainable living through awareness, empathy, and action among young people.

In her capacity as Miss Earth, she visited Thailand, France, Belgium (twice), Vietnam, Great Britain, Chile, United States, Dominican Republic, her hometown in the Czech Republic, and The Philippines.

Awards and achievements
Preceded by (Australia) Jessica Lane	Miss Earth; 2025	Succeeded by Incumbent
Preceded by Kristýna Pavlovičová	Miss Earth Czech Republic; 2025	Succeeded by Hana Dědková
