= Linda Górecká =

Czech beauty pageant titleholder and model

- Born: 14 July 2003 (age 23); Dětmarovice, Czech Republic
- Education: AHOL – Vyšší odborná škola
- Occupations: Student; model
- Beauty pageant titleholder
- Title: Miss Czech Republic 2025
- Major competitions: Miss Czech Republic 2025; (Winner); Miss World 2026; (Unplaced)

Linda Górecká (born 14 July 2003) is a Czech beauty pageant titleholder and model who was crowned Miss Czech Republic 2025. She represented the Czech Republic at the Miss World 2026 competition in Vietnam.

== Early life and education ==
Górecká was born and raised in Dětmarovice, Czech Republic. She studied preschool and out-of-school pedagogy at AHOL – Vyšší odborná škola in Ostrava. During her youth, she practiced street dance for eight years.

== Pageantry ==
=== Miss Czech Republic 2025 ===
On 3 May 2025, Górecká competed against nine other finalists at the Forum Karlín in Prague during the grand final of Miss Czech Republic 2025. At the conclusion of the event, she was crowned Miss Czech Republic 2025 by her predecessor, Adéla Štroffeková. She also won the preliminary Miss Photogenic award. Her win marked the first time a candidate from Dětmarovice secured the national title.

=== Miss World 2026 ===
Górecká was selected to represent the Czech Republic at the 75th edition of Miss World 2026, held in Vietnam.

== Advocacy and philanthropy ==
As part of her "Beauty with a Purpose" platform, Górecká advocates for breast cancer prevention and oncology patient care, a cause inspired by her mother's battle with breast cancer. Through her initiative, she has raised funds for cancer centers in the Moravian-Silesian Region and collaborated with the Alliance for Women with Breast Cancer to promote health awareness and early detection.

Awards and achievements
Preceded by Adéla Štroffeková	Miss Czech Republic; 2025	Succeeded by Lucie Pisková
