= Krystyna Pyszková =

Czech beauty pageant titleholder, Miss World (2023)

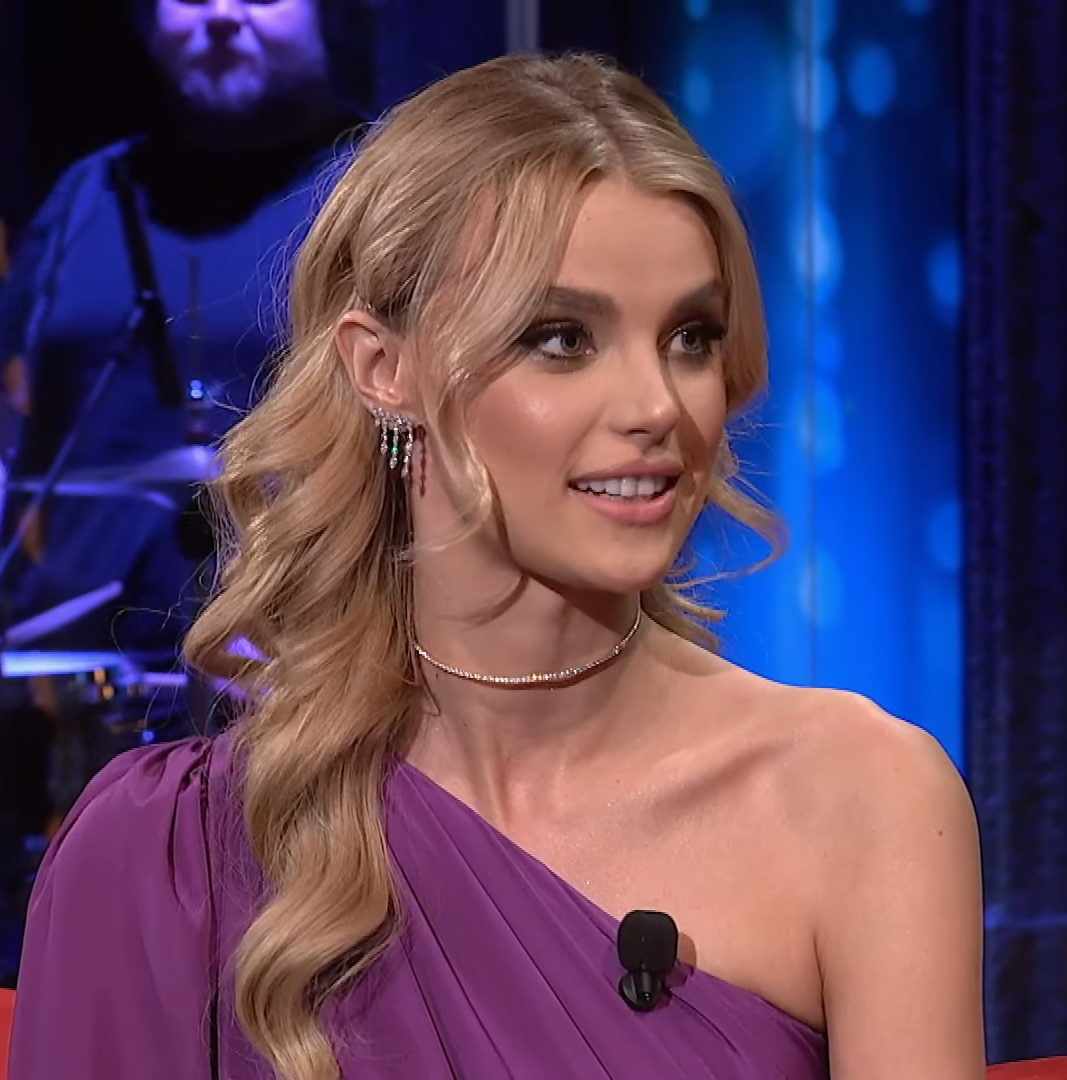
- Pyszková in 2024
- Born: 19 January 1999 (age 27); Třinec, Czech Republic
- Other name: Krystyna Pyszko
- Education: Charles University; MCI Management Center Innsbruck
- Height: 1.81 m (5 ft 11 in)
- Children: 1
- Beauty pageant titleholder
- Title: Miss Czech Republic 2022; Miss World 2023
- Major competitions: Miss Czech Republic 2022; (Winner); Miss World 2023; (Winner)

Krystyna Pyszková (Polish: Krystyna Pyszko; born 19 January 1999) is a Czech model and beauty pageant titleholder who won Miss World 2023. She also won Miss Czech Republic 2022 and is the second Czech woman to win Miss World.

== Early life and education ==
Krystyna Pyszková was born 19 January 1999 in Třinec, where she was educated at Gymnázium Třinec.

She grew up in village of Návsí, as a Silesian Goral member of the Polish minority located in Trans-Olza. Pyszková later relocated to Prague to further her education. Prior to winning Miss Czech Republic, Pyszková was studying law at Charles University in Prague, and management at MCI Management Center Innsbruck in Innsbruck.

== Pageantry ==
=== Miss Czech Republic 2022 ===
Pyszková began her career in pageantry in 2022, when she won Miss Czech Republic 2022, held on 7 May 2022. As the winner, she went on to represent the Czech Republic at Miss World 2023.

=== Miss World 2023 ===
Miss World was originally scheduled to be held in the United Arab Emirates. The pageant was later moved to India, and set to be held on 16 December 2023 in Delhi. It was later postponed to 2 March 2024 due to the 2023 elections in India, and later postponed once again to 9 March 2024 in Mumbai. Miss World began in New Delhi in February 2024 with its pre-pageant challenges, with Pyszková going on to place as a top four finalist for Europe in the top model challenge and as a top 10 finalist in the Beauty with a Purpose Challenge.

The final show of the pageant was held in Mumbai on 9 March, where Pyszková advanced as one of the seven finalists for Europe in the top 40; she later advanced as one of the three finalists for Europe in the top 12, two finalists for Europe in the top eight, and achieved the highest score from Europe in the top four. After the announcement of the top four, Pyszková was later crowned the winner. With her win, Pyszková became the second woman representing the Czech Republic to win Miss World, following Taťána Kuchařová who had been crowned Miss World 2006.

In her capacity as Miss World, Pyszková has traveled to India, Mauritius, and other countries.

== Modeling ==
In 2022, shortly after winning Miss Czech Republic, she walked the runway for Czech fashion designer Beata Rajská. That same year, she appeared on the cover of the Czech edition of Cosmopolitan magazine.

Since 2023, she has modeled in commercial campaigns for the fashion brand Guess.

In May 2024, she appeared on the cover of Vogue Czechoslovakia. Later that year, she closed a bridal fashion show by Czech design house Poner. She also walked for Vietnamese fashion designer Le Thanh Hoa at the Vietnam Beauty Fashion Fest (VBFF) 2024.

In January 2025, she appeared on the cover of Czech lifestyle magazine Ona Dnes. She also walked at Paris Haute Couture Week for Zuhair Murad and Celia Kritharioti, presenting their Spring–Summer 2024 collections. On 27 January 2025, she walked in Tony Ward’s Spring–Summer 2025 haute couture show during Paris Haute Couture Week. In November 2025, she made her first runway appearance after giving birth, modeling in a bridal show for Cuban‑Czech designer Osmany Laffita in Prague.

== Philanthropy ==
In 2023, Pyszková founded the Pyszko Foundation, a nonprofit organization focused on improving access to education for disadvantaged children, adults, and people with disabilities. The foundation supports multiple educational and inclusion-focused initiatives. In Tanzania, Pyszková helped co-establish a school for underprivileged children in collaboration with Sonta Foundation, where she previously volunteered as an English teacher. In the Czech Republic, she has supported institutions such as Santé for people with disabilities, donating specially adapted tablets and regularly spending time with residents at day centers. In 2025, Pyszková co-created a painting with a mentally disabled client from the Domov Sulická care center. The artwork was exhibited at the Kampa Museum in Prague and auctioned during a charity event under the patronage of the First Lady of the Czech Republic.

A major initiative of the foundation is the development of Money Monsters, an educational mobile app that teaches financial literacy through gamified real-life scenarios. The app is aimed at children, youth, and adults and includes interactive content such as budgeting, interest rates, and personal finance decision-making. The project has involved collaboration with developers, financial experts, and educators, with plans to introduce the app to Czech schools via an educational tour. The foundation’s broader mission includes raising awareness around education equity and empowering individuals through practical learning opportunities.

== Recognition ==
In 2025, she was included in the Forbes Czechia "30 Under 30" list.

== Personal life ==
In early September 2025, Pyszková has one child, with her partner, Swiss realtor Byron Baciocchi.

Awards and achievements
Preceded by Karolina Bielawska	Miss World; 2023	Succeeded by Suchata Chuangsri
Preceded by Karolína Kopíncová	Miss World Czech Republic; 2022	Succeeded by Adéla Štroffeková
Preceded by Karolína Kopíncová	Miss Czech Republic; 2022	Succeeded by Justýna Zedníková
