= Předboj =

- Municipality
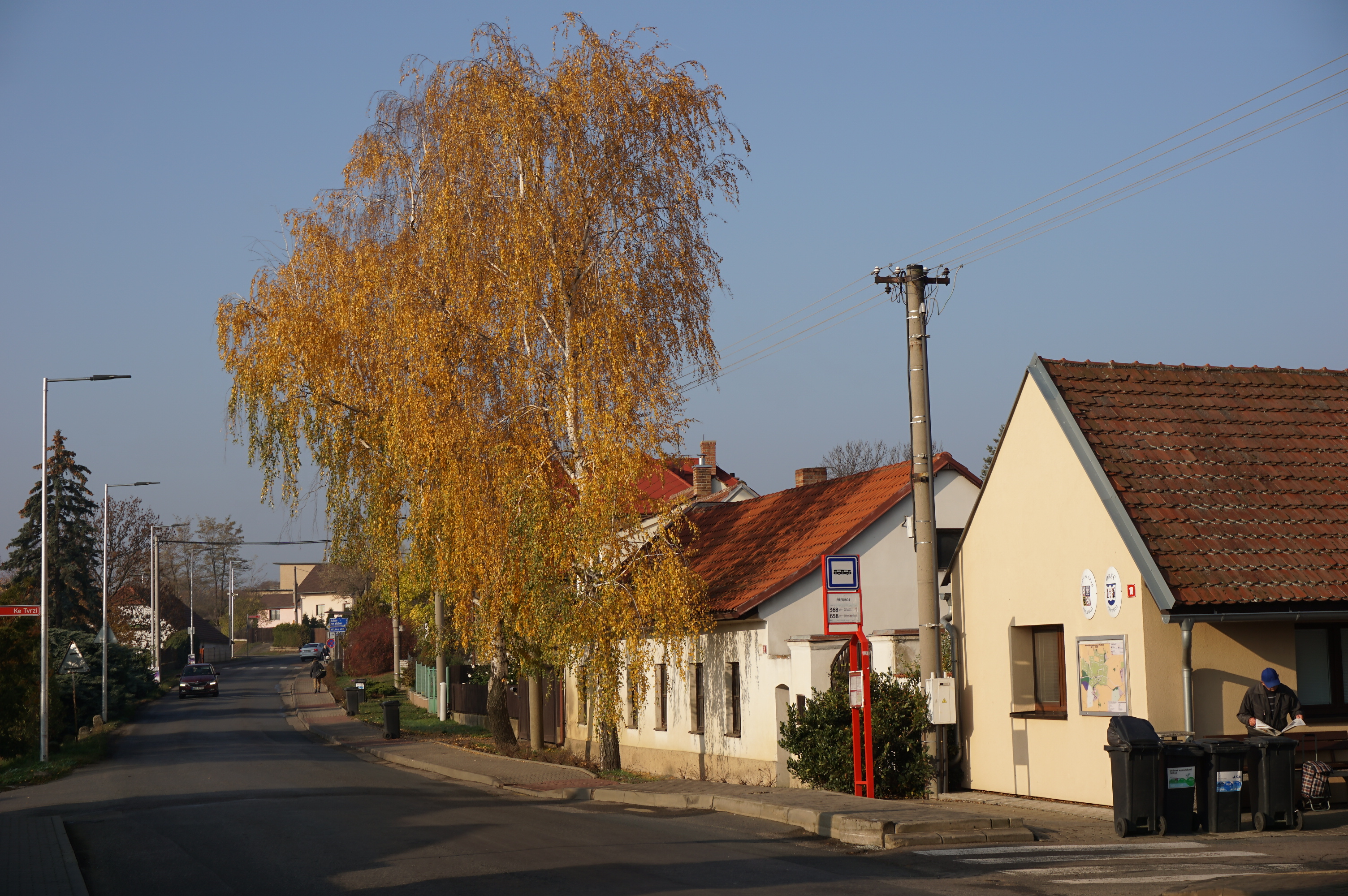
- Centre of Předboj

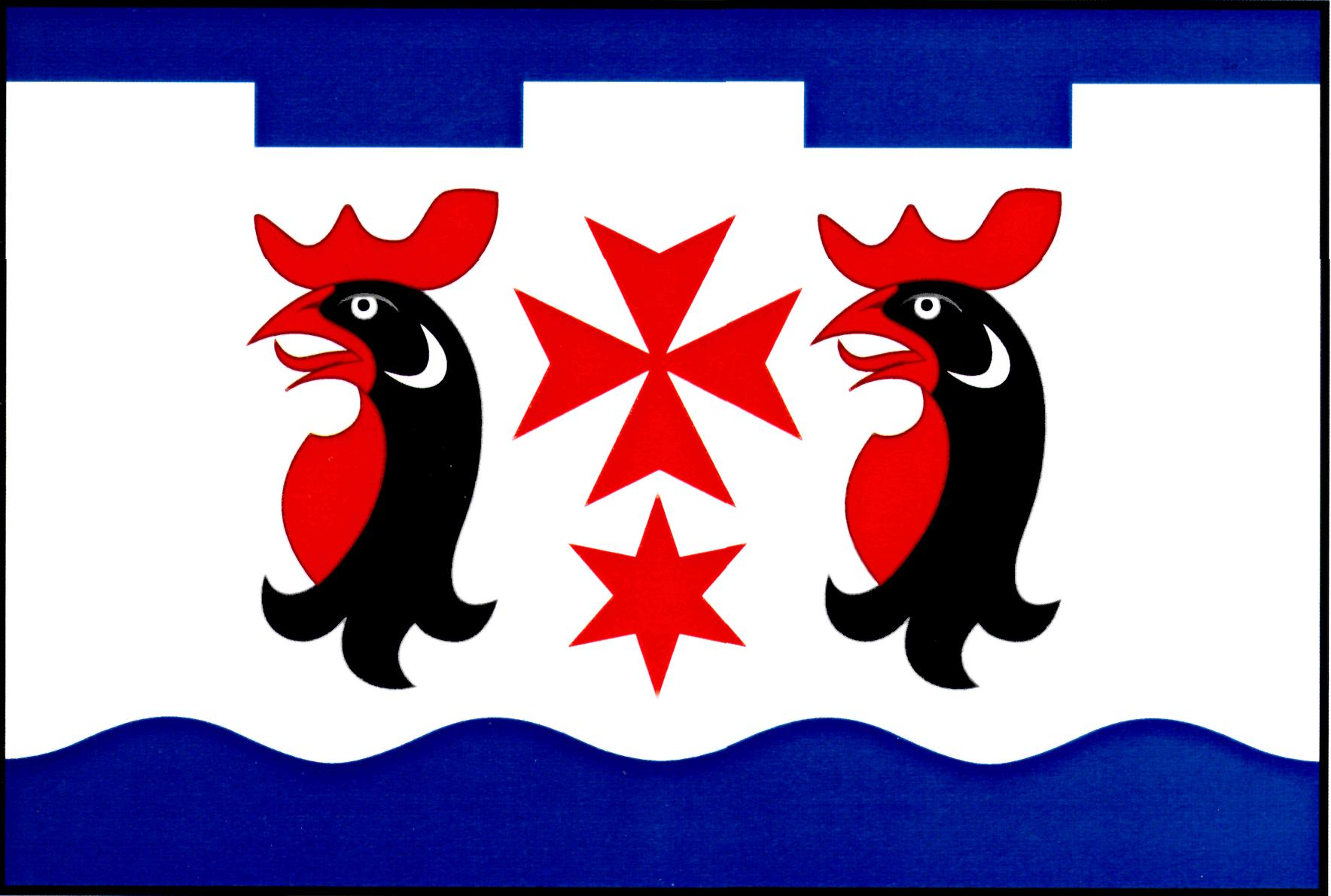
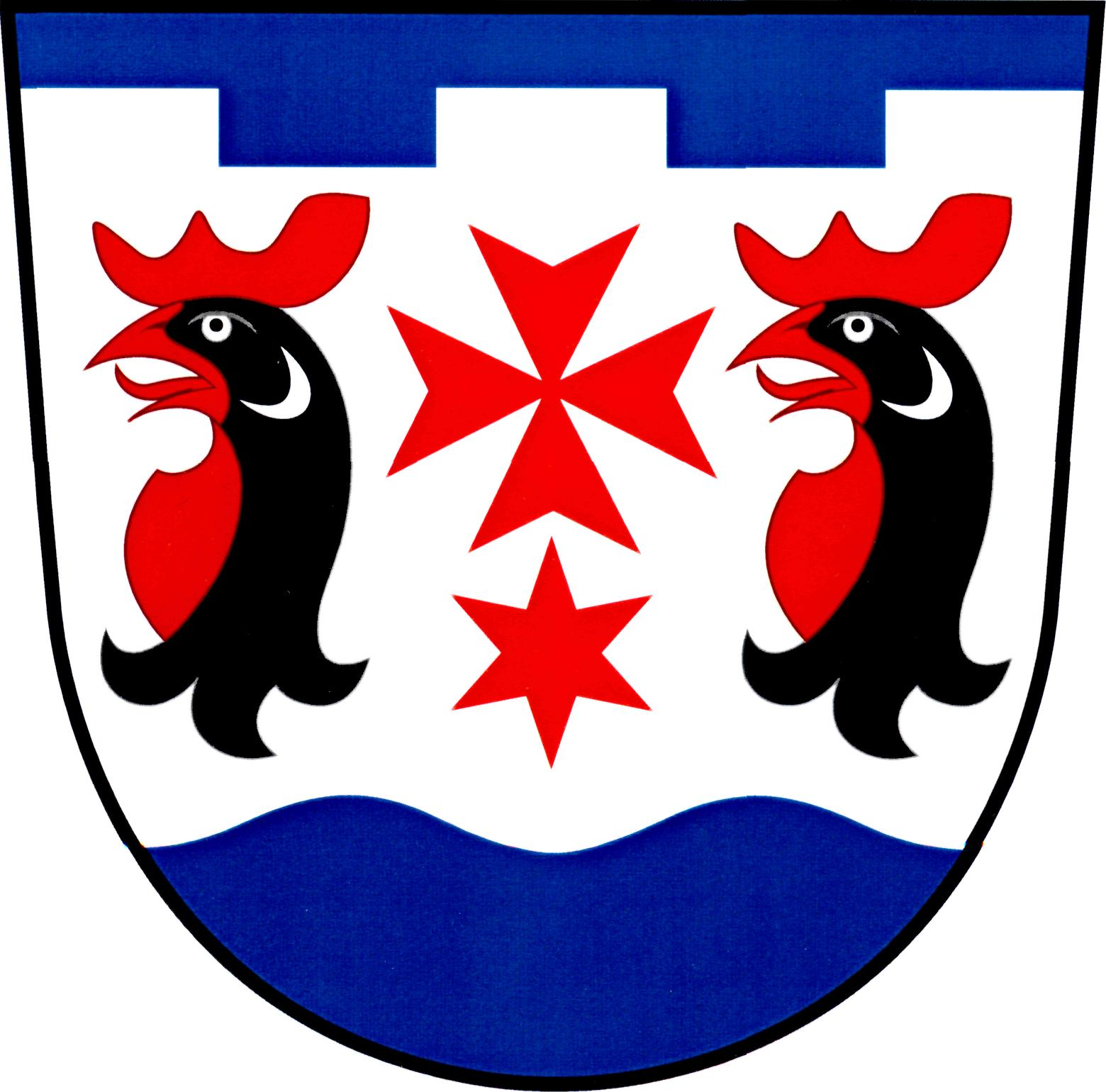
- Flag Coat of arms

- Location in the Czech Republic
- Coordinates: 50°13′32″N 14°28′36″E
- Country: Czech Republic
- Region: Central Bohemian
- District: Prague-East
- First mentioned: 1253

Area
  - Total: 4.07 km^{2} (1.57 sq mi)
- Elevation: 213 m (699 ft)

Population (2026-01-01)
  - Total: 1,453
  - Density: 357/km^{2} (925/sq mi)
- Time zone: UTC+1 (CET)
  - Summer (DST): UTC+2 (CEST)
- Postal code: 250 72
- Website: predboj.cz

Předboj is a municipality and village in Prague-East District in the Central Bohemian Region of the Czech Republic. It has about 1,500 inhabitants.

== Etymology ==
The initial name of the village was Přeboj. The Old Czech word přeboj meant 'robbery'. To make the name less unflattering and more understandable, it was changed to Předboj.

== Geography ==
Předboj is located about 12 kilometres (7 mi) north of Prague. It lies in an agricultural landscape in the Central Elbe Table. The highest point is at 235 metres (771 ft) above sea level. The bstream Kojetický potok flows through the municipality and supplies a system of several fishponds there.

== History ==
The first written mention of Předboj is from 1253, when King Wenceslaus I donated the village to the Knights of the Cross with the Red Star. It was founded on a trade route from Prague to the north. Předboj often changed owners and was mostly the property of various less important noble families. In 1671, when Předboj was owned by the St. George's Convent in Prague, the village was annexed to the Panenské Břežany estate.

== Demographics ==
Historical population

Year	Pop.	±%
1869	320	—
1880	314	−1.9%
1890	334	+6.4%
1900	348	+4.2%
1910	409	+17.5%

Year	Pop.	±%
1921	420	+2.7%
1930	422	+0.5%
1950	432	+2.4%
1961	432	+0.0%
1970	392	−9.3%

Year	Pop.	±%
1980	349	−11.0%
1991	313	−10.3%
2001	279	−10.9%
2011	695	+149.1%
2021	1,292	+85.9%

Source: Censuses

== Transport ==
The I/9 road (which connects the D8 motorway with Česká Lípa and the Czech–German border) runs along the eastern municipal border.

== Sights ==
The only protected cultural monument in the municipality are terrain remains of a medieval fortress that stood here in the 13th–15th century, now an archaeological site. However, these terrain remains were damaged and are now located in the garden of a family house.
