= Miss Supranational 2027 =

- Date: 2027

Miss Supranational 2027 will be the 18th Miss Supranational pageant.

Katrina Llegado of the Philippines will crown her successor at the end of the event.

== Contestants ==
The following are confirmed to compete:

Country/Territory	Contestant	Age (Note: Ages at the time of the pageant)	Hometown	Continent	Ref.
Australia	Charlie Farrow		Queensland	Oceania	
Czech Republic	Barbara Plintová	23	Třinec	Europe	
Guatemala	Valentina Estrada	18	El Progreso	Americas	
Nigeria	Melissa Toghanro	28	Delta State	Africa	
Philippines	Allyson Hetland	25	Angeles City	Asia	
Poland	Wiktoria Ptak	28	Supraśl	Europe	
Puerto Rico	Cecilia Acosta	24	Coamo	Caribbean	
Spain	Gabriela Marqués	25	Benissa	Europe	
Venezuela	Emiliana Carvallo	29	Caracas	Americas	
