= Eduarda Braum =

Brazilian beauty pageant titleholder

- Born: Eduarda da Silva Braum; April 25, 2001 (age 25); Afonso Cláudio, Espírito Santo, Brazil
- Height: 1.86 m (6 ft 1 in)
- Beauty pageant titleholder
- Title: Miss Universe Espírito Santo 2021; Miss Supranational Brazil 2025; Miss Supranational 2025
- Major competitions: Miss Brazil 2021; (Top 10); Miss Supranational Brazil 2025; (Winner); Miss Supranational 2025; (Winner)

Eduarda da Silva Braum (born April 25, 2001) is a Brazilian model and beauty pageant titleholder who won Miss Supranational 2025. She previously won Miss Supranational Brazil 2025, and was the first Brazilian to win Miss Supranational.

== Early life and education ==
Braum graduated with a degree in Portuguese/English language and pedagogy, where she founded the social initiative Protagonists of Tomorrow, a project that helps young people. Through this program, Braum spoke to students through engagements in public schools and communities.

== Pageantry ==
=== Miss Brazil 2021 ===
On 7 November 2021, Braum won her first pageant, Miss Universe Espírito Santo 2021. She was then selected to represent Espírito Santo at Miss Brazil 2021 and reached the top 10, with Teresa Santos of Ceará the winner.

=== Miss Supranational Brazil 2025 ===
On 4 April 2025, Braum represented Espírito Santo and won Miss Supranational Brazil 2025. She competed against 27 other candidates at the Hotel Sibara in Balneário Camboriú, Santa Catarina.

=== Miss Supranational 2025 ===
On 27 June 2025, Braum represented Brazil and won Miss Supranational 2025, competing against 66 other candidates at Strzelecki Park Amphitheater, Nowy Sącz, Lesser Poland, Poland.

During the question and answer round of the pageant, she was asked: "How do you handle criticism, especially as a public figure? And what have you learned from it?", Eduarda replied:

Throughout my journey, I learned to understand myself and realized that the most important thing is to know who I am and why I am here. When you truly understand yourself, what others say will no longer be so important and life will become easier.

Braum was crowned by her predecessor, Harashta Haifa Zahra of Indonesia, making her the first Brazilian and fifth Latin American woman to win the title after Andrea Aguilera of Ecuador at Miss Supranational 2023.

As reigning Miss Supranational, Eduarda travelled to fourteen (14) countries so far, such as: Poland (after winning the contest); United States (Disney and attending the sash ceremony for the new Miss Supranational Cuba in Miami); Saint Barthélemy, Italy, Philippines and Thailand (vacation/holiday period); India (attending Miss Diva 2025); Mexico (attending Miss Mexico 2025 pageant); Dominican Republic (for Miss and Mister Supranational DR 2026), Colombia (as an ambassador for the fight against leprosy in Cali), Spain (for Miss RNB España Supranational), Indonesia (for the final of Puteri Indonesia 2026); Czech Republic (for the Miss Czech Republic 2026 final); South Africa (during the Miss SA 2026 final);

Awards and achievements
| Preceded by Harashta Haifa Zahra | Miss Supranational; 2025 | Succeeded by Katrina Llegado |
| Preceded by Isadora Murta | Miss Supranational Brazil; 2025 | Succeeded by Lara Marina |
