= Miss Supranational 2025 =

16th Miss Supranational pageant

- Date: 27 June 2025
- Presenters: Davina Reeves; Nico Panagio; Aleksander Sikora; Fezile Mkhize; Dani Walker
- Entertainment: Natalia Nykiel; Grzegorz Hyży; Izabela Płóciennik; Kalina Levvska
- Venue: Strzelecki Park Amphitheater, Nowy Sącz, Lesser Poland, Poland
- Broadcaster: Polsat; YouTube
- Entrants: 66
- Placements: 24
- Debuts: Democratic Republic of the Congo
- Withdrawals: Aruba; Bangladesh; Botswana; Chile; Côte d'Ivoire; Croatia; Ghana; Gibraltar; Honduras; Italy; Laos; Pakistan; Panama; Paraguay; Sierra Leone; Slovakia; Uruguay
- Returns: Angola; Cambodia; Estonia; Jamaica; Kyrgyzstan; Latvia; Macau; Namibia; Norway; South Korea; Togo; Turkey; Zambia; Zimbabwe
- Winner: Eduarda Braum; Brazil
- Congeniality: Aslihan Morali, Canada
- Best National Costume: Leix Collins, Venezuela
- Photogenic: Lilja Pétursdóttir, Iceland

Miss Supranational 2025 was the 16th edition of the Miss Supranational pageant, held at the Strzelecki Park Amphitheater in Nowy Sącz, Poland, on 27 June 2025.

Harashta Haifa Zahra of Indonesia crowned Eduarda Braum of Brazil as her successor at the end of the event. This is Brazil's first title in the pageant's history.

== Background ==
=== Location and date ===
On 18 January 2025, Gerhard Parzutka von Lipinski, the president of the Miss Supranational Organization, announced that the 16th edition of Miss Supranational would take place on 27 June 2025 at Małopolska region, Poland.

=== Selection of participants ===
==== Replacements ====
Cemre Eylülker of Turkey withdrew for undisclosed reasons, and was replaced by Candan Şeviktürk.

Argita Xhangoli of Albania, who won Miss Shqipëria Supranational 2024, withdrew for undisclosed reasons, and was replaced by Xhesika Pengili.

==== Debuts, returns, and withdrawals ====
This edition marked the debut of the Democratic Republic of the Congo and the return of Estonia and Latvia, which last competed in 2015; Angola in 2017, Macau in 2019; Norway in 2021; Kyrgyzstan in 2022; and Cambodia, Jamaica, Namibia, South Korea, Togo, Turkey, Zambia and Zimbabwe in 2023.

Laura Aleksa of Croatia, María Rosa Aviri Ncogo of Equatorial Guinea, Valentina Nartey of Ghana, Maria Gerolymatou of Greece, Dahyan Zelinsky of Paraguay, and Uwase Kimana Emelique of Rwanda were expected to participate but withdrew for unspecified reasons.

Additionally, some contestants who had appeared in the SupraChat Challenge also withdrew without explanation, including Aminance Fofanah of Sierra Leone, Bella Davis of Sweden, and Aina Qureishi of Pakistan. Qureishi was later replaced by Anniqa Jamal Iqbal, but also withdrew.

== Results ==
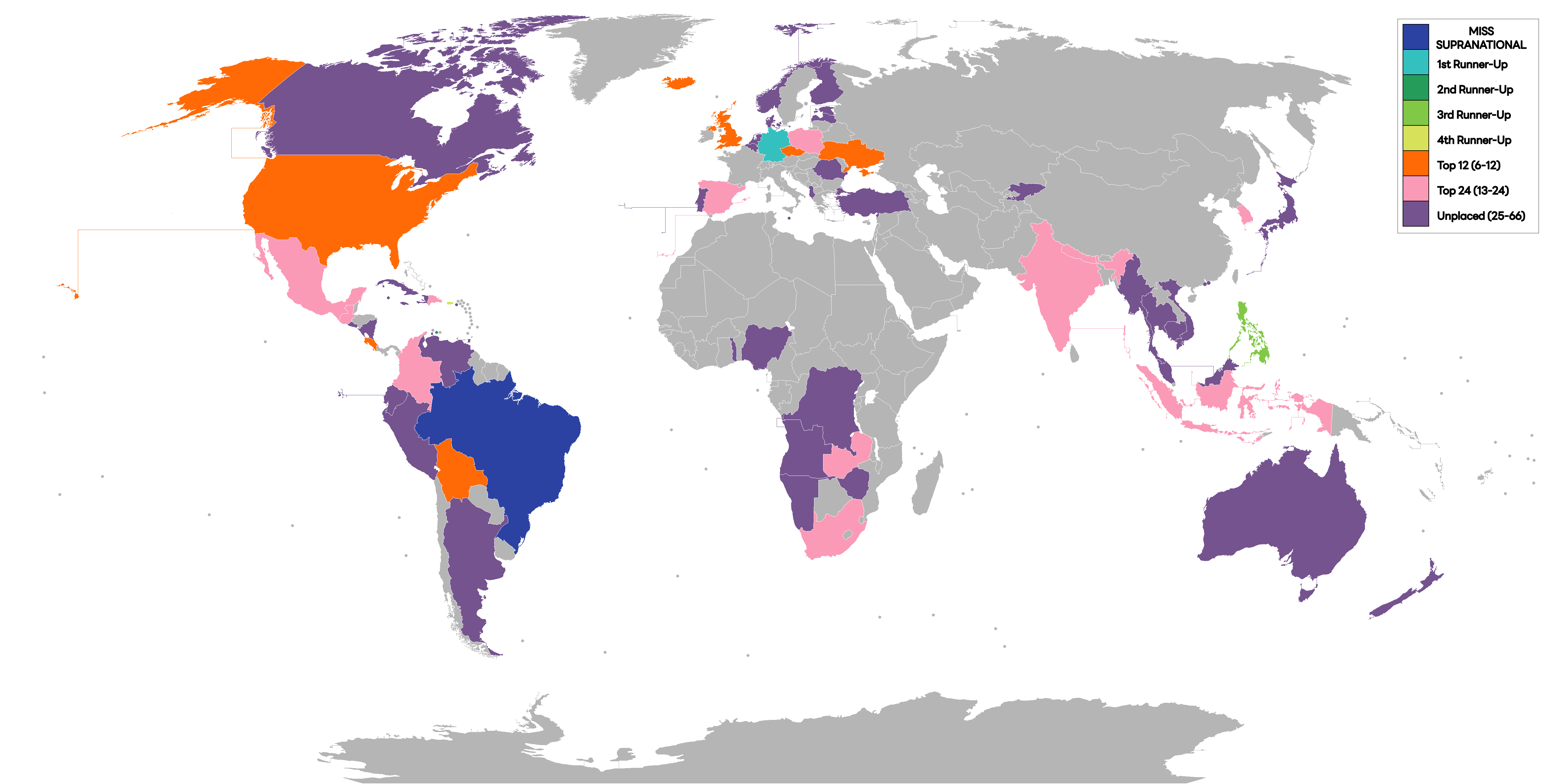
Miss Supranational 2025 participating countries and territories

=== Placements ===
| Placement | Contestant |
|---|---|
| Miss Supranational 2025 | Brazil – Eduarda Braum |
| 1st Runner-Up | Germany – Anna Lakrini |
| 2nd Runner-Up | Curaçao – Quishantely Leito |
| 3rd Runner-Up | Philippines – Tarah Valencia |
| 4th Runner-Up | Puerto Rico – Valerie Klepadlo |
| Top 12 | Bolivia – Vanessa Hayes; Costa Rica – Fabiola Vindas; Czech Republic – Michaela Macháčková; Iceland – Lilja Pétursdóttir; Ukraine – Kateryna Bilyk ★; United Kingdom – Brittany Feeney; United States – Marvelous Sanyaolu |
| Top 24 | Colombia – Daniela Roldán; Dominican Republic – Karibel Perez; Guatemala – Tokyo Gonzalo Δ; India – Ayushree Malik Δ; Indonesia – Firsta Yufi Amarta Putri; Mexico – Angie Melchum ∆; Nepal – Dikshya Awasthi; Poland – Kasandra Zawal; South Africa – Lebohang Raputsoe; South Korea — Hyeon-jeong Yu; Spain – Luna Negrín; Zambia – NaMakau Nawa Δ |

- ★ – placed into the Top 12 by fan-voting challenge
- Δ – placed into the Top 24 by fast-track challenges

=== Continental titleholders ===
The award was presented to representatives who achieved the highest ranking within the continent or region, excluding those in the Top 5.

| Continent/Region | Contestant |
|---|---|
| Africa | Zambia — NaMakau Nawa |
| Americas | United States — Marvelous Sanyaolu |
| Asia and Oceania | Indonesia — Firsta Yufi Amarta Putri |
| Caribbean | Dominican Republic — Karibel Perez |
| Europe | Iceland — Lilja Pétursdóttir |

=== Special awards ===
| Award | Contestant |
|---|---|
| Best in National Costume | Venezuela – Leix Collins |
| Miss Congeniality | Canada – Aslihan Morali |
| Miss Photogenic | Iceland – Lilja Pétursdóttir |
| Miss Talent | Albania – Xhesika Pengili |

=== Fast-track challenges ===
| Challenge | Contestant |
|---|---|
| Supra Chat | India – Ayushree Malik |
| Supra Model of The Year | Zambia – NaMakau Nawa |
| Supra Influencer | Guatemala – Tokyo Gonzalo |
| Supra Fan Vote | Ukraine – Kateryna Bilyk |
| From The Ground Up | Mexico – Angie Melchum |

== Challenge events ==
=== Supra Chat ===
The Supra Chat event commenced in April 2025, and was broadcast via the official YouTube channel of Miss Supranational. Each participant had the opportunity to introduce themselves to a gathering comprising five to nine individuals. Individuals from ten groups were selected to advance to the final round of the competition.

==== First Round ====
- Winner to the semi-final.
- Wildcard to the semi-final.

| Group | Country/Territory | | | | | | |
| Group | 1 | 2 | 3 | 4 | 5 | 6 | 7 |
|---|---|---|---|---|---|---|---|
| 1 | Australia | Belgium | Czech Republic | Iceland | Netherlands | Poland | Philippines |
| 2 | Bolivia | Canada | Dominican Republic | Guatemala | Mexico | Peru | Puerto Rico |
| 3 | Cambodia | India | Nigeria | Pakistan (Note: Aina Qureishi, withdrew from the competition) | Philippines | Turkey | Vietnam |
| 4 | Cayman Islands | Democratic Republic of the Congo | Curaçao | Ghana | Namibia | New Zealand | Norway |
| 5 | Angola | Brazil | Costa Rica | Ecuador | Myanmar | Paraguay | Venezuela |
| 6 | Germany | Haiti | Jamaica | Sweden | United Kingdom | Zimbabwe | —N/a |
| 7 | Argentina | Colombia | Cuba | El Salvador | Equatorial Guinea | Nicaragua | Spain |
| 8 | Albania | Denmark | Estonia | Latvia | Malta | Sierra Leone | Zambia |
| 9 | Indonesia | Japan | Macau | Malaysia | Nepal | —N/a | —N/a |
| 10 | South Africa | Trinidad and Tobago | Ukraine | United States Virgin Islands | —N/a | —N/a | —N/a |

==== Semi Final Round ====
- Advanced to the final round.

| Group | Country/Territory | | | | | | |
| Group | 1 | 2 | 3 | 4 | 5 | 6 | 7 |
|---|---|---|---|---|---|---|---|
| 1 | Australia | Brazil | Cayman Islands | Curaçao | India | Nigeria | Puerto Rico |
| 2 | El Salvador | Jamaica | Malaysia | Sweden | Ukraine | Zambia | Zimbabwe |

==== Final Round ====
- Advanced to the Top 24.

| Placement | Country/Territory |
|---|---|
| Winner | India – Ayushree Malik |
| Top 6 | Cayman Islands – Tracey Campbell; Curaçao – Quishantely Leito; El Salvador – Verónica Gaytán; Zambia – NaMakau Nawa; Zimbabwe – Pauline Marere |

=== Miss Influencer Opportunity ===
In the Miss Influencer Opportunity, one woman per continent were selected as winners through the Facebook competition, and the rest were chosen as winners through Instagram and YouTube competition. As a result, they automatically became part of the Top 15 finalists. If one of them was successful in the challenge, they automatically advanced to become a semifinalist in the finals.

- Advanced to the Top 24 via Miss Influencer Opportunity.

| Placement | Country |
|---|---|
| Winner | Guatemala – Tokyo Gonzalo |
| Top 20 | Australia – Krysta Heath; Brazil – Eduarda Braum; Cambodia – Chandara Chhum; Canada – Aslihan Morali; Dominican Republic – Karibel Pérez; Ecuador – Ana Isabel Cobos; India – Ayushree Malik; Indonesia – Firsta Yufi Amarta Putri; Malaysia – Eshwin Kaur; Myanmar – Cherry Moe; Namibia – Savannah Pereira; Philippines – Tarah Valencia; Portugal – Daryna Levytska; Puerto Rico – Valerie Klepadlo; Thailand – Michelle Behrmann; Turkey – Candan Şeviktürk; Vietnam – Kỳ Duyên Võ; Zambia – NaMakau Nawa; Zimbabwe – Pauline Marere |

=== Supra Fan Vote ===
The winner of the Supra Fan Vote was automatically advanced to the Top 12 of Miss Supranational 2025. Voting began on 19 June 2025, and lasted until the final night. The final list of the leaderboard was announced on 25 June before the finals.

- Advanced to the Top 12 via Supra Fan-Vote.

| Placement | Country |
|---|---|
| Winner | Ukraine – Kateryna Bilyk |
| Top 10 | Guatemala – Tokyo Gonzalo; Indonesia – Firsta Yufi Amarta Putri; Namibia – Savannah Pereira; Philippines – Tarah Valencia; South Korea – Hyeon-jeong Yu; Thailand – Michelle Behrmann; Turkey – Candan Şeviktürk; Vietnam – Kỳ Duyên Võ; Zambia - Namakau Nawa |

=== Supra Model of the Year ===
The Supra Talent Finals event was streamed live at the Miss Supranational official YouTube channel at 16:00 on 23 June 2025. At the finals, one of the five continental winners will be announced to advance in the finals after being named as the overall winner during the final night.

- Advanced to the Top 24 via Supra Model of the Year.

| Placement | | Contestant |
|---|---|---|
| Winner | | Zambia – NaMakau Nawa |
| Continental Winners | Africa | Zambia – NaMakau Nawa |
| Continental Winners | Americas | United States – Marvelous Sanyaolu |
| Continental Winners | Asia and Oceania | Malaysia – Eshwin Kaur |
| Continental Winners | Caribbean | Trinidad and Tobago – Shenelle Ramkhelawan |
| Continental Winners | Europe | Germany – Anna Lakrini |
| Semi-Finalists | Brazil – Eduarda Braum; Curaçao – Quishantely Leito; Czech Republic – Michaela Macháčková; Philippines – Tarah Valencia; South Africa – Lebohang Raputsoe | |

=== Supra Talent ===
On 21 June, nine talent entries will showcase on Miss Supranational's official YouTube channel, followed by a voting process. The Supra Talent Finals event will broadcast live at the Miss Supranational official YouTube channel on 23 June 2025.

| Placement | Contestant |
|---|---|
| Winner | Albania – Xhesika Pengili |
| Top 9 | Belgium – Sophia Sanfilippo; Costa Rica – Fabiola Vindas; Germany – Anna Lakrini; Haiti – Sklouchere Pierre; Indonesia – Firsta Yufi Amarta Putri; Nicaragua - Maycrin Jáenz; United Kingdom – Brittany Feeney; Zambia – NaMakau Nawa |

== Pageant ==
=== Presenters ===
On 10 June 2025, the President of the Miss Supranational Organization, Gerhard Parzutka von Lipinski, announced Nico Panagio as the host for the Miss Supranational 2025 Final Show for the second consecutive time. Davina Reeves is also set to return as co-host, joining Panagio at the finals.

- Nico Panagio — South African actor, host of Survivor South Africa
- Davina Reeves — American actress and Miss New York USA 2010
- Aleksander Sikora — Polish Presenter

=== Panel of experts ===
The final show will broadcast live on the official Miss Supranational YouTube channel at 8pm CET, on 27 June 2025, with the panel of experts consisting of:

- Ada Fijał – Polish actress and singer
- Agnieszka Popielewicz – Polish journalist and presenter
- Andrea Aguilera – Miss Supranational 2023 from Ecuador
- Gerhard von Lipinski – Founder and CEO of Miss Supranational organization
- Harashta Haifa Zahra – Miss Supranational 2024 from Indonesia
- Ilona Krawczyńska – Polish model, presenter, blogger and influencer
- Robert Czepiel – General Director of Jubiler Schubert/World of Amber
- Valeria Vázquez – Miss Supranational 2018 from Puerto Rico

== Contestants ==
66 contestants have been confirmed to compete:

| Country/Territory | Contestant | Age (Note: Ages at the time of the pageant) | Hometown | Continent |
|---|---|---|---|---|
| Albania | Xhesika Pengili | 21 | Tirana | Europe |
| Angola | Kendra Cordeiro | 23 | Benguela | Africa |
| Argentina | Camila Barraza | 31 | Buenos Aires | Americas |
| Australia | Krysta Heath | 28 | Maitland | Oceania |
| Belgium | Sophia Sanfilippo | 23 | Brussels | Europe |
| Bolivia | Vanessa Hayes | 26 | Santa Cruz | Americas |
| Brazil | Eduarda Braum | 24 | Afonso Cláudio | Americas |
| Cambodia | Chandara Chhum | 26 | Phnom Penh | Asia |
| Canada | Aslihan Morali | 27 | Ancaster | Americas |
| Cayman Islands | Tracey Campbell | 20 | West Bay | Caribbean |
| Colombia | Daniela Roldán | 20 | Cali | Americas |
| Costa Rica | Fabiola Vindas | 24 | Guápiles | Americas |
| Cuba | Freddra Reyes | 24 | Havana | Caribbean |
| Curaçao | Quishantely Leito | 22 | Willemstad | Caribbean |
| Czech Republic | Michaela Macháčková | 23 | Rtyně v Podkrkonoší | Europe |
| Democratic Republic of the Congo | Caroline Kondé | 28 | Kinshasa | Africa |
| Denmark | Sofie Ørn Andersen | 24 | Hillerød | Europe |
| Dominican Republic | Karibel Pérez | 28 | Santo Domingo | Caribbean |
| Ecuador | Ana Isabel Cobo | 25 | Ambato | Americas |
| El Salvador | Verónica Gaytán | 23 | La Libertad | Americas |
| Estonia | Samantha Kasela | 23 | Tartu | Europe |
| Finland | Venla Laios | 19 | Järvenpää | Europe |
| Germany | Anna Lakrini | 27 | Stuttgart | Europe |
| Guatemala | Tokyo Gonzalo | 21 | Antigua | Americas |
| Haiti | Sklouchere Pierre | 25 | Lauderhill | Caribbean |
| Hong Kong | Wanding Luo | 24 | Hong Kong | Asia |
| Iceland | Lilja Pétursdóttir | 21 | Reykjavík | Europe |
| India | Ayushree Malik | 20 | New Delhi | Asia |
| Indonesia | Firsta Yufi Amarta Putri | 24 | Banyuwangi | Asia |
| Jamaica | Sara-Dee Palmer | 29 | Kingston | Caribbean |
| Japan | Nao Kawada | 25 | Tokyo | Asia |
| Kyrgyzstan | Ekaterina Zabolotnova | 29 | Bishkek | Asia |
| Latvia | Meldra Rosenberg | 23 | Riga | Europe |
| Macau | Feng-Wei Zou | 22 | Ruijin | Asia |
| Malaysia | Eshwin Kaur | 24 | Kuala Lumpur | Asia |
| Malta | Hayley Ghiller | 24 | San Ġwann | Europe |
| Mexico | Angie Melchum | 22 | Tulancingo | Americas |
| Myanmar | Cherry Moe | 23 | Meiktila | Asia |
| Namibia | Savannah Pereira | 24 | Windhoek | Africa |
| Nepal | Dikshya Awasthi | 23 | Kailali | Asia |
| Netherlands | Josephine Onderdonck | 23 | Breda | Europe |
| New Zealand | Rovelyn Milford | 26 | Auckland | Oceania |
| Nicaragua | Maycrin Jaénz | 26 | Granada | Americas |
| Nigeria | Paula Ezendu | 26 | Awka | Africa |
| Norway | Julie Tollefsen | 30 | Oslo | Europe |
| Peru | Mayra Messa | 29 | Lima | Americas |
| Philippines | Tarah Valencia | 24 | Baguio | Asia |
| Poland | Kasandra Zawal | 30 | Bierzglinek | Europe |
| Portugal | Daryna Levytska | 22 | Aveiro | Europe |
| Puerto Rico | Valerie Klepadlo | 24 | Rincón | Caribbean |
| Romania | Ana Maria Mozăceanu | 23 | Bucharest | Europe |
| South Africa | Lebohang Raputsoe | 26 | Sharpeville | Africa |
| South Korea | Hyeon-jeong Yu | 20 | Daegu | Asia |
| Spain | Luna Negrín | 21 | Madrid | Europe |
| Thailand | Michelle Behrmann | 32 | Bangkok | Asia |
| Togo | Marie Kolani | 24 | Lomé | Africa |
| Trinidad and Tobago | Shenelle Ramkhelawan | 29 | La Romaine | Caribbean |
| Turkey | Candan Şeviktürk | 21 | Istanbul | Europe |
| Ukraine | Kateryna Bilyk | 28 | Bohuslav | Europe |
| United Kingdom | Brittany Feeney | 26 | Maghull | Europe |
| United States | Marvelous Sanyaolu | 22 | Baton Rouge | Americas |
| United States Virgin Islands | Aminisha Bailey | 25 | Charlotte Amalie | Caribbean |
| Venezuela | Leix Collins | 26 | Caracas | Americas |
| Vietnam | Kỳ Duyên Võ | 20 | Haiphong | Asia |
| Zambia | NaMakau Nawa | 20 | Mongu | Africa |
| Zimbabwe | Pauline Marere | 30 | Masvingo | Africa |
