= Chum Darang =

Indian model, actress and entrepreneur (born 1996)

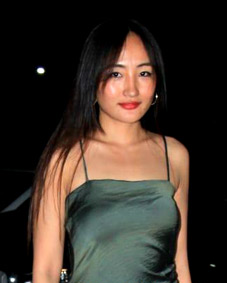
- Darang in 2022
- Born: 16 October 1991 (age 34); Pasighat, Arunachal Pradesh
- Occupations: Model; actress; entrepreneur; social activist
- Beauty pageant titleholder
- Title: Miss Himalaya 2015; Miss Earth India 2016
- Years active: 2020–present
- Major competitions: Miss Himalaya Pageant; Miss Earth India

Chum Darang (born 16 October 1991) is an Indian model, actress, social activist, entrepreneur and beauty pageants title holder who works in Hindi cinema, television and streaming platforms. She was crowned Miss AAPSU in 2010, and later represented India at Miss Earth India 2016 and Miss Asia World 2017. In 2024, she participated in Bigg Boss 18 and finished as 4th Runner-Up of the show.

== Early life ==
Darang was born on 16 October 1991 in Pasighat, Arunachal Pradesh. She grew up in a close-knit family alongside her parents and three siblings, two younger brothers and one elder sister. They follow Donyi-Polo.

She attended D' Ering Memorial Higher Secondary School in Pasighat, Arunachal Pradesh.

== Pageantry ==
Darang's interest in beauty pageants began in 2007 when she was 16. A major turning point in her journey was winning Miss AAPSU in 2010. She later participated in various national and international beauty contests. She was a finalist in Miss North East Diva 2014.

=== Miss Himalaya 2015 ===
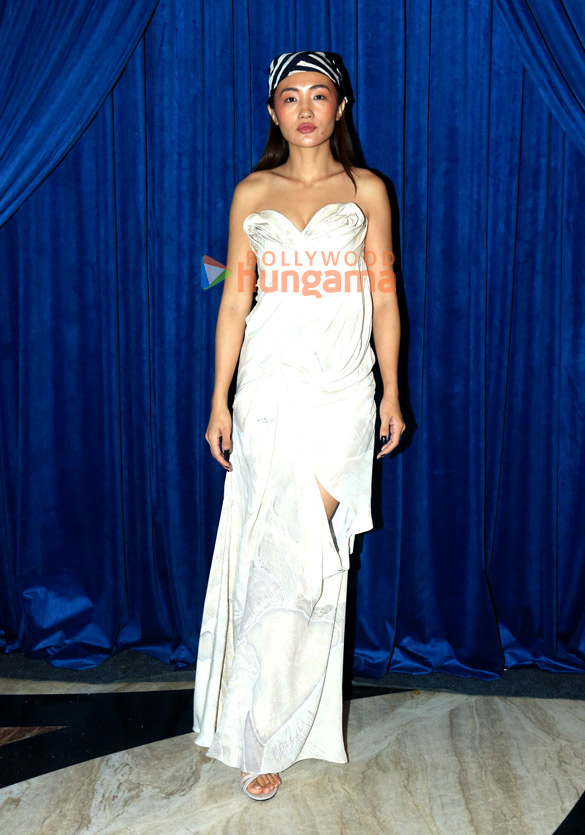
Darang snapped at the Lakme Fashion Week 2025

She was the second runner-up at Miss Himalaya pageant in 2015.

=== Miss Earth India 2016 ===
Darang participated in the Miss Earth India 2016 contest, which selects representatives for Miss Earth. She won the title of Miss Earth India Water 2016.

=== Miss Asia Pacific World 2017 ===
She represented India in the Miss Asia Pacific World 2017 beauty pageant, competing with contestants from 24 countries. She was placed fifth and won the Miss Internet subtitle.

=== Miss Tiara India International 2017 ===
Darang holds the crown of Miss Tiara India International 2017. She also won two subtitles, "Miss Sports Gear" and "Miss Best National Costume".

== Career ==
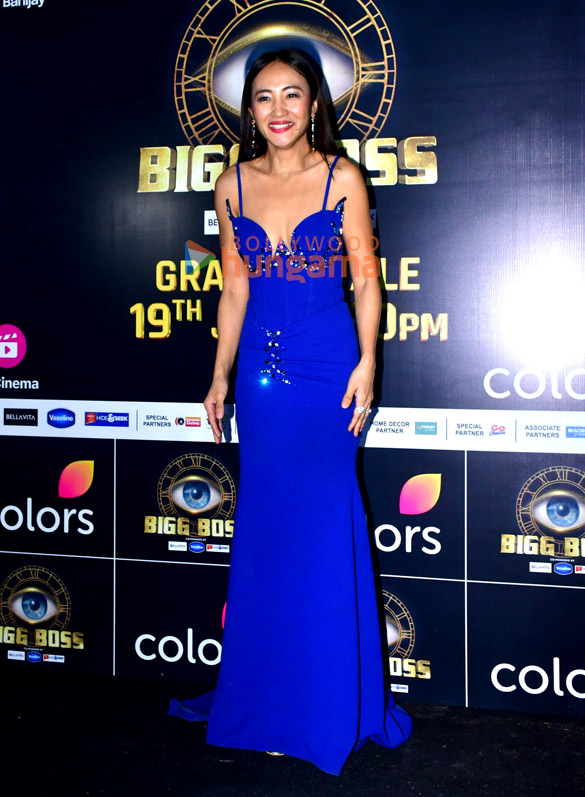
Darang at the grand finale of Bigg Boss 18

In 2020, Darang made her acting debut with Amazon Prime Video's Paatal Lok, directed by Avinash Arun and Prosit Roy.

In 2022, she made her Bollywood film debut with Badhaai Do, where she played a pivotal role alongside Bhumi Pednekar and Rajkummar Rao. Her portrayal of a same-sex partner in the film was highly praised for its sensitivity and authenticity, earning her recognition as an emerging talent in the Indian film industry. The same year, she also appeared in Sanjay Leela Bhansali's Gangubai Kathiawadi, where she played the role of a prostitute.

She also participated in the eighteenth season of Bigg Boss and emerged as 4th runner up.

== Filmography ==
=== Films ===
Year	Title	Role	Notes	Ref.
2022	Badhaai Do	Rimjhim Jongkey		
2022	Gangubai Kathiawadi	Chum		

=== Television ===
Year	Title	Role	Notes	Ref.
2020	Paatal Lok	Infomercial girl		
2024–2025	Bigg Boss 18	Contestant	4th runner-up	
2025	Khauf	Svetlana		
