= Miss Earth Argentina =

National beauty pageant

Miss Earth Argentina (Bendice La Corona Tierra)
- Formation: 2001
- Type: Beauty pageant
- Location: Argentina
- Members: Miss Earth
- Official language: Spanish
- National Director: N Entertainment, Esteban Luna
- Key people: Nadia Cerri
- Website: www.misschanneltv.com

Bendice La Corona Tierra/Miss Earth Argentina is a national Beauty pageant that selects Argentina's representative to the Miss Earth pageant.

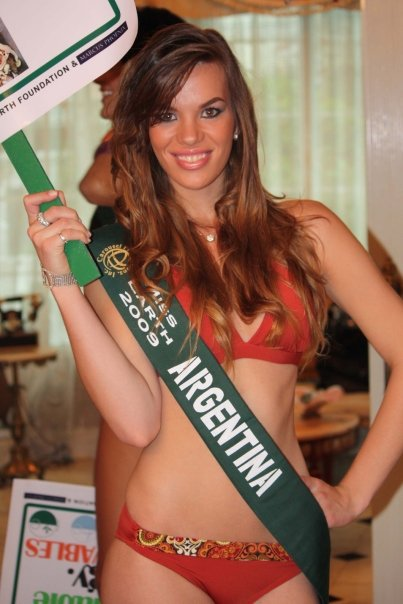
Gisela Menossi, Miss Earth Argentina 2009

== History ==
The Miss Earth Argentina title was launched in 2001 with Daniela Stucan as the first titleholder who represented Argentina in the international pageant and won an elemental title, Miss Fire (third runner-up) in the Miss Earth 2001 pageant. In 2006, the pageant was held by Glamour Argentino. From 2007 to 2010, the franchise was under the organizers of Belleza Argentina/N-Entertainment under the direction of Nadia Cerri (1997 Miss International Argentina). In 2012, the franchise was awarded to Gary Colos of Miss Argentina La Nueva Era when N-Entertainment failed to send delegates in the 2010 and 2011 editions of Miss Earth.

== Titleholders ==
Color key

- Declared as Winner
- Ended as runner-up
- Ended as one of the finalists or semifinalists

Year	Miss Earth Argentina	Placement	Special award(s)
2001	Daniela Stucan	Miss Fire (3rd Runner-up)	(gold) Miss Photogenic
2002	Mercedes Apuzzo		
2003	Marisol Pipastrelli		
2004	Daniela Puig		
2005	Eliana Ocolotobiche		
2006	Andrea Carolina Garcia		
2007	María Antonella Tognolla		
2008	Camila Solórzano		
2009	Gisela Menossi		
2010	Isolina Boero	Did not compete	
2012	Tatiana Maria Bischof		(bronze) Swimsuit (Group 3)
2014	Carolina Yanuzzi	Did not compete	
2015	Julieta Fernandez		
2016	Lara Bochle		
2017	Fiorela Hengemuhler		
2018	Dolores Cardoso		
2019	Florencia Barreto Fessler		
2020	Estrella Danieri		
2021	Flora Veloso		(bronze) Beachwear Competition
2022	Sofia Martinoli		
2023	Selene Bublitz		
2024	Sol Bonfigli		
2025	Florencia Hernandez	Top 25	(gold) Miss Bikini (Americas)
2026	Nazarena Torrejón	TBA	

== See also ==
- Miss Argentina
