= Miss Divine Beauty 2020 =

- Date: 30 August 2020
- Venue: Virtual contest
- Entrants: 40
- Placements: 15
- Winner: Tanvi Kharote
- Photogenic: Shivani Tak

Miss Divine Beauty 2020 was the 2nd edition of Miss Divine Beauty held on 30 August 2020 virtually. Tejaswini Manogna crowned Tanvi Kharote as her successor at the end of the virtual pageant.

== Final results ==
Final Results	Candidate	International Placement
Miss Earth India 2020	Tanvi Kharote	Unplaced
Miss Earth India Eco Tourism 2020	Shriya Torne
Miss Earth India Eco Angel 2020	Maria Chanu Pangambam
Top 6	Drishti Singh; Tanya Mittal; Yukta Upadhyay

=== Special awards ===
Award	Winner
Miss Beautiful Eyes	Aishwarya Dikshit
Miss Beautiful Hair	Tanya Mittal
Miss Beautiful Smile	Tanvi Kharote
Miss Body Beautiful	Deep Supriyam
Miss Fresh Face	Drishti Singh
Miss Photogenic	Shivani Tak
Miss Popularity	Maria Chanu Pangambam
Miss Ramp Walk	Shriya Torne
Miss Timeless Beauty	Yukta Upadhyay

== Format ==
=== Selection of participants ===
Online registration for auditions commenced on 25 June 2020. City auditions were held only at selected locations in India due to the COVID-19 pandemic situation. The contestants and auditions were divided into four zones, which had a mentor to each zone. Auditions were held for all states and union territories of India. The pageant explores potential talent in all states and union territories of India, selecting 7-8 ambassadors to represent their area in the national finals. Empowering local talents, these representatives will be titled Miss Divine Beauty 2020 or Miss Earth India Finalists 2020 and the national winner will be crowned in the 2020 grand finale.

=== Top 15 ===
The top 15 finalists were selected through a virtual meeting among the 40 shortlisted contestants. The Top 15 Finalists were officially announced on 18 August 2020 via the Miss Divine Beauty's social media pages. On 24 August 2020, it was confirmed that Rich Sinha, a selected finalist, will be withdrawing from the contest due to her conflicting schedules from her modeling career.

=== Top 6 ===
The selection of the Top 6 finalists from the Top 15 is based on preliminary activities that include, public choice, video of various walking styles, virtual interviews, social work done or willingness to work for the environment and to protect Mother Earth. It was revealed on 28 August 2020.

== Finalists ==
=== Top 6 ===
The Top 6 finalists were revealed on 28 August 2020:

Contestant	Age	Hometown
Drishti Singh		
Maria Chanu Pangambam		Manipur
Shriya Torne	22	Nashik
Tanvi Kharote	22	Pune
Tanya Mittal	23	Gwalior
Yukta Upadhyay	22	Indore

=== Top 15 ===
The Top 15 semifinalists were revealed on 18 August 2020:

Contestant	Age	Hometown
Aishwarya Dikshit	24	Mumbai
Akanksha Singh	25	Bangalore
Alka Chandra		Chhattisgarh
Deep Supriyam	24	Agra
Drishti Singh	18	Navi Mumbai
Mandeep Kaur		Haryana
Maria Chanu Pangambam	21	Manipur
Richa Sinha	Withdrawn Participation	
Rukaiya Kalyanwala	22	Mumbai
Shivani Tak	22	Aurangabad
Shriya Torne	22	Nashik
Tanvi Kharote	22	Pune
Tanya Mittal	23	Gwalior
Yaseera Verma	19	Mumbai
Yukta Upadhyay	22	Indore
