= Miss Diva 2017 =

5th edition of Miss Diva

- Date: 11 October 2017
- Presenters: Yudhishtir Urs; Malaika Arora
- Entertainment: Kriti Sanon
- Venue: Hotel Sahara Star, Mumbai
- Broadcaster: Colors Infinity
- Entrants: 15
- Placements: 06
- Winner: • Shraddha Shashidhar • Peden Ongmu Namgyal
- Congeniality: Trisha Sood
- Photogenic: Peden Ongmu Namgyal

The 5th edition of Miss Diva took place on 11 October 2017. The top 15 contestants selected from India competed in the pageant.

All contestants were mentored by Miss Universe 2000 Lara Dutta. Throughout the 6-episodic reality series there were a series of challenges wherein the contestants were given scores. At the end of the 5th episode the 3 contestants with the 3 lowest scores were eliminated and the remaining 12 contestants advanced to the finale which was the 6th episode.

At the finale held on 11 October 2017, Roshmitha Harimurthy along with the reigning Miss Universe 2016 Iris Mittenaere crowned Shraddha Shashidhar as Miss Universe India 2017, while Srinidhi Shetty crowned Peden Ongmu as Miss Supranational India 2017 and Aradhana Buragohain crowned Apeksha Porwal as Miss Diva 2017 2nd runner up. The two winners represented India at Miss Universe 2017, Miss Supranational 2017.

== Final results ==
Color keys

- The contestant Won in an International pageant.
- The contestant was a Runner-up in an International pageant.
- The contestant was a Semi-Finalist in an International pageant.
- Unplaced

Final Results	Candidate	International Placement
Miss Universe India 2017	Shraddha Shashidhar	Unplaced
Miss Diva Supranational 2017	Penden Ongmu Namgyal	Top 25
Runner-up	Apeksha Porwal	
Top 6	Shannon Gonsalves; Tejaswini Manogna; Vijaya Sharma	

=== Special awards ===
Award	Winner
Dazzler Eterna Best Makeover	Tejaswini Manogna
Yamaha Fascino Miss Talented	Tejaswini Manogna
Dr. Kathuria Miss Beautiful Smile	Vijaya Sharma
Miss Beautiful Skin	Vijaya Sharma
Yamaha Fascino Miss Fascinating	Apeksha Porwal
Miss Photogenic	Peden Ongmu Namgyal
Miss Beach Body beautiful	Shannon Gonsalves
Miss Rampwalk	Spatika Surpaneni
Miss Active	Spatika Surpaneni
Miss Spectacular Eyes	Trisha Sood
United Colors of Benetton Miss Woman with a Voice	Spatika Surpaneni
Miss Tech Diva	Shannon Gonsalves
Miss Congineality	Trisha Sood

== Contestants ==
Name	Age	Height	Hometown	Placement
Apeksha Porwal	24	1.73 m (5 ft 8 in)	Mumbai	Miss Diva – Runner-up
Ekta Jaggi	24	1.78 m (5 ft 10 in)	New Delhi	
Elisha Mayor	23	1.75 m (5 ft 9 in)	Punjab	
Menka Rai	20	1.72 m (5 ft 7 1/2 in)	Seoni District	
Monika Choudhary	24	1.76 m (5 ft 9 1/2 in)	Gurgaon	
Peden Ongmu	22	1.74 m (5 ft 8 1/2 in)	Gangtok	Miss Diva Supranational 2017
Shannon Gonsalves	21	1.77 m (5 ft 9 1/2 in)	Mumbai	Top 6
Shelly Kataria	18	1.73 m (5 ft 8 in)	New Delhi	
Shraddha Shashidhar	21	1.73 m (5 ft 8 in)	Chennai	Miss Diva Universe 2017
Shweta Gadad	22	1.72 m (5 ft 7 1/2 in)	Bangalore	
Sonali Singh	20	1.70 m (5 ft 7 in)	Lucknow	
Spatika Surapeneni	22	1.75 m (5 ft 9 in)	Hyderabad	
Tejaswini Manogna	21	1.72 m (5 ft 7 1/2 in)	Hyderabad	Top 6
Trisha Sood	21	1.71 m (5 ft 7 1/2 in)	New Delhi	
Vijaya Sharma	25	1.73 m (5 ft 8 in)	New Delhi	Top 6

== Judges ==
- Lara Dutta – Miss Universe 2000
- Iris Mittenaere – Miss Universe 2016
- Chuck Russell – Hollywood Director
- Rajkumar Rao
- Vijender Singh
- Kabir Khan (director)

== Crossover ==
Miss Diva

- 2018: Elisha Mayor

Femina Miss India

- 2013: Vijaya Sharma
- 2015: Apeksha Porwal
- 2019: Telangana : Tejaswini Manogna

Miss Earth India

- 2016: Shweta Gadad
- 2019: Tejaswini Manogna

International beauty pageant

Miss Supranational

- 2013: Vijaya Sharma

'Miss Earth

- 2019: Tejaswini Manogna
