= Aap Kaa Surroor (album) =

Studio album by Himesh Reshammiya

Studio album by Himesh Reshammiya
- Released: 19 January 2006
- Studio: T-Series
- Genre: Indipop
- Label: T-Series
- Producer: T-Series

Himesh Reshammiya chronology
| Aap Kaa Surroor (2006) | Aap Se Mausiiquii (2016) |

Aap Kaa Surroor is the debut music album by Himesh Reshammiya, produced by T-Series, released in 2006. The album sold 1.3 million (0.13 crore) units, making it the seventh best-selling album of the year in India.

== Track listing ==
All songs were composed and sung by Himesh Reshammiya with lyrics penned by Sameer.

=== Original ===
All lead vocals by Himesh Reshammiya.

| No. | Title | Length |
|---|---|---|
| 1. | "Tera Surroor" | 5:58 |
| 2. | "Naam Hai Tera" | 4:52 |
| 3. | "Samjho Na Kuch To Samjho Na" | 6:56 |
| 4. | "I Love You Sayyoni" | 3:44 |
| 5. | "Tu Yaad Na Aaye Aisa Koi Din Nahi" | 5:43 |
| 6. | "Mere Lamhon Ki Aarzoo" | 5:16 |
| 7. | "Aashiqana Hai Dil" | 4:39 |
| 8. | "Chhed De Pyar Di Baat" | 5:53 |
| 9. | "Chahe Gila Karo" | 5:33 |
| 10. | "Wada Tainu" | 6:05 |
| 11. | "Nachle Its Folkish" | 5:11 |
| Total length: | | 57:30 |

=== Remixes ===
All lead vocals by Himesh Reshammiya and DJ Akbar Sami.

| No. | Title | Length |
|---|---|---|
| 1. | "Tera Surroor" (Remix) | 4:58 |
| 2. | "Naam Hai Tera" (Remix) | 3:30 |
| 3. | "Samjho Na Kuch To Samjho Na" (Remix) | 4:17 |
| 4. | "I Love You Sayyoni" (Remix) | 4:21 |
| 5. | "Aashiqana Hai Dil" (Remix) | 5:21 |
| 6. | "Chhed De Pyar Di Baat" (Remix) | 4:08 |
| 7. | "Nachle Its Folkish" (Remix) | 4:58 |
| Total length: | | 30:13 |

=== Unplugged ===
Both lead vocals by Himesh Reshammiya.

| No. | Title | Length |
|---|---|---|
| 1. | "Tera Surroor" (Unplugged) | 6:00 |
| 2. | "Naam Hai Tera" (Unplugged) | 4:52 |
| Total length: | | 10:52 |

== Music videos ==
- "Tera Surroor" - "Tera Surroor" was the first of the videos to be released from this album. The music video begins with Reshammiya performing for a small audience. At the same time, it is also indirectly addressed to his violinist (played by Minissha Lamba) and love interest and the entry of another woman in his life arouses her suspicion and the video ends with him tearfully holding an "I love you" card the violinist wrote him. This version was remixed by DJ Akbar Sami. A remix video is also available for this title song.
- "Naam Hai Tera" - The second of the videos is "Naam Hai Tera"; it featured Deepika Padukone playing one of the two female leads in the video. Like the first video in the album, even this one ends inconclusively. The remix version of the same song had a very upbeat feel to it: actually being more of a dance number than an extension of the song and its sad lyrics. A remix song also featuring Deepika Padukone is also available in different sequence.
- "Samjho Na Kuch To Samjho Na" - The video for "Samjho Na Kuch To Samjho Na" also featured a love triangle. Sonal Chauhan first appeared in this music video as Reshammiya's love interest. It tells that Reshammiya wasn't able to express his love. In this video, Reshammiya, is seen playing the Guitar.
- "I Love You Sayyoni" - It featuring Nihaar Pandya and a beautiful model Candice Boucher (Durban, South Africa) who is kept captive by her other lover and Reshammiya succeeds in getting her to Nihaal. It also featured Ahsaas Channa, who plays as a young boy in this video.
- "Wada Tainu" - Also made into music video. It featured Yuvika Chaudhary as the lead who will marry someone else but loved Reshammiya.
- "Tu Yaad Na Aaye" - A video song has also been made of the song "Tu Yaad Na Aaye Aisa Koi Din Nahi". The video starts with people praying for a dead girl in a graveyard, who used to be Reshammiya's love interest. Then the song starts with Reshammiya recording a song in studio memorizing those moments he spent with her.
- "Chhed De Pyaar Ki Baat" - The video song depicts a girl fan of Reshammiya and her Boyfriend's story in a Club.
- Nachhle- Its Folkish - There is a video song of the song shows Reshammiya singing among girl dancers and masses and in between them he has an illusion of his love interest.

== Remakes ==
The song "Naam Hai Tera" was recreated by Tanishk Bagchi for the 2018 film Hate Story 4, with the title "Naam Hai Mera", which was sung by Neeti Mohan. Lyrics were re-written by Shabbir Ahmed and performed by Urvashi Rautela.
