= Rashi Rao =

Indian beauty pageant contestant

- Born: Rashi Yadav; Gurgaon, Haryana, India
- Occupations: Model, Dancer
- Height: 5 ft 9 in (175 cm)
- Beauty pageant titleholder
- Title: Miss Earth India 2016
- Years active: 2014-present
- Hair color: Black
- Eye color: Black
- Major competitions: Indian Princess 2015 (Top 10); Miss Diva Universe 2015 (Top 16); Miss Earth India 2016 (Winner); Miss Earth 2016 (Unplaced)

Rashi Rao is an Indian model who was crowned Miss Earth India 2016. Rashi represented India at the Miss Earth 2016 pageant.

Rao was one of the finalists at the Miss Diva 2015 pageant. She was crowned as Miss Earth India in 2016. She succeeded Miss Earth India 2015, Aaital Khosla, and represented India in Miss Earth 2016 held in Philippines. She represented India in Ghana in Trash in bin campaign in 2017 as Miss India.

Awards and achievements
Preceded by Aaital Khosla	Miss Earth India; 2016	Succeeded by Shaan Suhas Kumar
