= Miss Divine Beauty =

National beauty pageant competition in India

- Formation: 2019
- Type: Beauty pageant
- Headquarters: New Delhi
- Location: India
- Members: • Miss Earth (2019 – present) • Miss International (2023 – 2024) • Miss Global (2023)
- Official language: English
- Founder and Chief Executive Officer: Deepak Agarwal
- Parent organization: Divine Group
- Website: Official website

Miss Divine Beauty is a national beauty pageant in India organized by the Divine Group. The pageant primarily selects India's representatives for the international Miss Earth competition, one of the Big Four major international beauty pageants.

Since 2021, the pageant has also conferred the "Beauty with a Responsibility" award, which recognizes participants for their social or environmental initiatives. The 2025 recipient is Vanshika Parmar, an environmental advocate from New Delhi, recognized for her initiative titled "Project Go Green".

Komal Choudhary from Pune, is the current Miss Earth India. She was crowned on 19 September 2025 at the Indradhanush Auditorium in Panchkula, Haryana.

== History ==
India has participated in the Miss Earth pageant since its inception in 2001. From 2001 to 2013, India's representatives at Miss Earth were selected by Femina Miss India, which is sponsored by Femina, a women's magazine published by the Times Group. Subsequently, the franchise for selecting representatives from India to participate at the Miss Earth pageant was acquired by Glamanand Supermodel India. The Glamanand Group lost the franchise privilege in 2018.

India's representatives to the Miss International beauty pageant was initially selected by the Eve's Weekly Miss India contest, since its inception in 1960, until the year 1988.

Since the year 1991, Femina Miss India sent Indian delegates to compete at Miss International, and was successful in producing two first runner-ups and one second runner-up titles. The last highest placement of Femina Miss India's representative at Miss International was achieved by Shonali Nagrani, who was crowned as the first runner-up in Miss International 2003. The Times Group dropped the franchise of Miss International in 2015. The last representative to Miss International by the Miss India Organization was Jhataleka Malhotra in 2014.

The Divine Group acquired the rights to send India's delegates to the Miss Earth in the year 2019. and Miss International in 2023. Deepak Agarwal, the founder and CEO of Divine Group, serves as one of the National Directors. The first edition of Miss Divine Beauty was held on 31 August 2019 at Kingdom of Dreams, New Delhi. The finale was witnessed by Miss Earth 2018 Nguyễn Phương Khánh, Miss Intercontinental 2018 Karen Gallman and Miss Earth Water 2018 Valeria Ayos. Tejaswini Manogna became the first delegate to win the title of Divine Miss India. From 2019 onwards, Miss Divine Beauty is responsible for the selection of future Miss Earth India.

Miss Divine Beauty aims to extend its wholehearted support to the women of today who have the potential to lead and represent the country tomorrow. Contest is devised and programmed to empower the women of today to be capable of being recognized at one of the biggest platform and voice their opinion on social rights and responsibilities and extend their support to make society a better place to live with peace globally. The winners will represent India at Miss Earth, Miss International and other international pageants.

— Miss Divine Beauty Organization

In July 2023, the Divine Group obtained the license to send a delegate representing India to the Miss International pageant being held annually in Japan and is one among the Big Four major international beauty pageants in the world. The licence is valid for three years (2023-2025).

== Editions ==
Below is the complete list of Miss Divine Beauty:

Year	Date	Miss Divine Beauty	Entrants	Pageant venue
2019	August 30, 2019	Tejaswini Manogna	40	Kingdom of Dreams, Gurgaon, Delhi
2020	August 31, 2020	Tanvi Kharote	20	Virtual Pageant
2021	September 24, 2016	Rashmi Madhuri	18	Welcomhotel, Dwarka, New Delhi
2022	September 3, 2022	Vanshika Parmar	27	Jawaharlal Nehru Auditorium, New Delhi
2023	August 26, 2023	Priyan Sain	16	Jawaharlal Nehru Auditorium, New Delhi
2024	August 31, 2024	Gauri Gothankar	12	Golden Tulip Suites, Gurgaon
2025	September 19, 2025	Komal Choudhary	17	Indradhanush Auditorium, Panchkula, Haryana

=== Titleholders ===
Edition	Year	Miss Divine Beauty	Current titles			Other Title(s)
Edition	Year	Miss Divine Beauty	Miss Earth India	1st Runner-up	2nd Runner-up	Other Title(s)
1	2019	Tejaswini Manogna	Tejaswini Manogna	Rashmi Madhuri	Nikeet Dhillon	Miss Intercontinental India – Sonal Dubey
2	2020	Tanvi Kharote	Tanvi Kharote	Shriya Torne	Maria Chanu Pangambam	Not awarded
3	2021	Rashmi Madhuri	Rashmi Madhuri	Alankrita Shahi	Not awarded	
4	2022	Vanshika Parmar	Vanshika Parmar	Sukraty Saxena	Simran Singh Gurjar	Miss Global India – Mansi Chourasiya
Edition	Year	Miss Earth India	Miss International India	Runners Up		Other Title(s)
Edition	Year	Miss Earth India	Miss International India	Miss Earth India	Miss International India	Other Title(s)
5	2023	Priyan Sain	Praveena Aanjna	Tejaswini Shrivastava	Pema Bhutia	
6	2024	Gauri Gothankar	Rashmi Shinde	Deepali Arrora	Nilanshi Patel	
7	2025	Ekta Singh	Komal Chaudhary	Sneha Hegde	Bahun Nongrum	

== Representatives at international pageants ==
The following is the placement of Times Mister India titleholders in international pageants.

- : Declared as Winner
- : Ended as runner-up or top 5/6 qualification
- : Ended as one of the finalist/Semi-finalists
- : Unplaced but given special award(s)

=== Miss Earth ===
Year	Delegate	Age^{[α]}	State	Competition performance	
Year	Delegate	Age^{[α]}	State	Placements	Special award(s)
2019	Tejaswini Manogna	25	Telangana	Unplaced	3 Special Awards: Miss Global Choice; (gold) – Talent (Water Group); (bronze) – Long Gown (Water Group)
2020	Tanvi Kharote	22	Maharashtra	Unplaced	
2021	Rashmi Madhuri	27	Karnataka	Unplaced	
2022	Vanshika Parmar	18	Himachal Pradesh	Unplaced	
2023	Priyan Sain	21	Rajasthan	Top 20	
2024	Gauri Gothankar	25	Maharashtra	Unplaced	
2025	Komal Choudhary	25	Maharashtra	Top 25	
2026	Aarya Aawadhoot	21	Maharashtra	TBA	

== Former Franchise ==
=== Miss International ===
Year	Delegate	Age^{[α]}	State	Competition performance	
Year	Delegate	Age^{[α]}	State	Placements	Special award(s)
2023	Praveena Aanjna	24	Rajasthan	Unplaced	1 Special Award: Top 8 – Best in National Costume
2024	Rashmi Shinde	26	Maharashtra	Unplaced	

=== Miss Global ===
Year	Delegate	Age^{[α]}	State	Competition performance	
Year	Delegate	Age^{[α]}	State	Placements	Special award(s)
2023	Mansi Chourasiya	24	Madhya Pradesh	Unplaced	• Miss Photogenic

=== Miss Intercontinental ===
Year	Delegate	State	Placement	Special Awards
2019	Sonal Dubey	Chhattisgarh	Unplaced	
2019	Surina Jaidka	Punjab	Couldn't compete	

== See also ==
- Miss Earth India
- List of beauty pageants in India
