= Rashi (disambiguation) =

Rashi was a medieval French rabbi. It may also refer to:

== People ==
- Kshetrimayum Rashi, Indian actress
- Rashi Bunny, Indian actress
- Rashi Fein, American health economist
- Rashi Mal, Indian actress
- Rashi Rao, Indian model
- Taylor Rashi, American baseball player

== Places ==
- Rashi, Iran, a village in the Gilan Province of Iran

== Schools ==
- Rashi School, Reform Jewish school in Dedham, Mass.

== Other uses ==
- Rashi script, semicursive typeface for the Hebrew alphabet
- Rashi language, a Bantu language or dialect of Tanzania
- Rāśi, a concept in Hindu astrology
