= Tipppsy =

2024 Indian film by Deepak Tijori

- Theatrical release poster
- Directed by: Deepak Tijori
- Written by: Suvidha Mall; Deepak Tijori
- Produced by: Raju Chadha
- Starring: Deepak Tijori; Kainaat Arora; Alankrita Sahai; Sonia Birje; Natasha Suri; Nazia Hussain
- Release date: 10 May 2024
- Running time: 122 minutes
- Country: India
- Language: Hindi
- Box office: ₹0.08 crore

Tipppsy (or Tipsy) is a 2024 Indian Hindi-language drama thriller film directed by Deepak Tijori and produced by Raju Chadha. The movie stars Deepak Tijori, Kainaat Arora, Alankrita Sahai, Sonia Birje, Nazia Hussain, Natasha Suri, in the lead roles.

== Synopsis ==
Set in Goa, the story is about the interconnected lives of the main characters, each dealing with their own challenges and dreams. Deepak Tijori plays a police officer who is conflicted between love and responsibility, while Alankrita Sahai's character is a determined woman battling against societal expectations. As their lives intersect, hidden secrets come to light, resulting in surprising twists and turns.

== Cast ==
- Deepak Tijori as Jacob, a Goa Police officer
- Alankrita Sahai as Pony, tourist in Goa
- Kainaat Arora as Yami, Pony's friend
- Sonia Birje as Selene, Pony's friend
- Natasha Suri as Tanya, Pony's friend
- Nazia Hussain as Iris, Pony's friend
- Danish Bhatt as Kabir
- Aditya Lakhia as Dr. Gerard
- Mandeep Kaur Sandhu as Jessy
- Bharat Bhatia
- Harjinder Singh as Sooraj
- Pawan Pandey as Gardner
- Mithun Rodwittiya as Martin
- Manish Goplani

== Reception ==
Mahpara Kabir of ABP News rated 3/5 stars and observed, "'Tipppsy' engages audiences with its gripping storyline, performances, and skilled direction. Tijori's vision, coupled with the ensemble cast's talent creates a memorable cinematic experience that lingers long after the credits roll. With its blend of drama, romance, and suspense, Tipppsy takes viewers on a rollercoaster ride of emotions, captivating them from start to finish. Tijori's directorial prowess, combined with strong performances and engaging storytelling, solidifies it as a standout film in Hindi cinema."

== Release ==
The film was officially released on 10 May 2024.

== See also ==
- The Hangover
