= Badhaai Do =

2022 Indian film by Harshvardhan Kulkarni

- Theatrical release poster
- Directed by: Harshavardhan Kulkarni
- Written by: Suman Adhikary; Akshat Ghildial; Harshavardhan Kulkarni
- Produced by: Vineet Jain
- Starring: Rajkummar Rao; Bhumi Pednekar; Sheeba Chaddha; Chum Darang; Gulshan Devaiah
- Cinematography: Swapnil S. Sonawane
- Edited by: Kirti Nakhwa
- Music by: Songs: Amit Trivedi; Guest Composers: Tanishk Bagchi; Ankit Tiwari; Khamosh Shah; Score: Hitesh Sonik
- Production company: Junglee Pictures
- Distributed by: Zee Studios
- Release date: 11 February 2022
- Running time: 147 minutes
- Country: India
- Language: Hindi
- Budget: ₹25 crore
- Box office: est. ₹28.33 crore

Badhaai Do (transl. Give Congratulations (Note: "Do" also means 2 in Hindi.)) is a 2022 Indian Hindi-language comedy-drama film directed by Harshavardhan Kulkarni. Produced by Junglee Pictures, it is a spiritual sequel to Badhaai Ho (2018). Depicting a couple in a lavender marriage, it stars Rajkummar Rao and Bhumi Pednekar with Gulshan Devaiah, Chum Darang, Sheeba Chaddha and Seema Pahwa in supporting roles.

The film was officially announced in March 2020. Principal photography began on 5 January 2021 in Dehradun. The film was theatrically released on 11 February 2022. Though commercially unsuccessful, the film garnered widespread critical acclaim and accolades. At the 68th Filmfare Awards, it was the second biggest awardee with six wins: Best Film (Critics), Best Actor (Rao), Best Actress (Critics) (Pednekar), Best Supporting Actress (Chaddha), Best Story and Best Screenplay.

== Plot ==
Shardul Thakur is a closeted police officer unhappily stationed at a women's precinct in Dehradun. One afternoon, a woman named Suman "Sumi" Singh, who works as a physical education teacher at Wynberg Allen School, visits the station to report a man who has been stalking her. Unbeknownst to Shardul, the man had catfished Sumi on a lesbian dating app, then threatened to expose her sexuality unless she slept with him. Shardul roughs up the stalker, who reveals Sumi's secret. A few days later, Shardul approaches Sumi and proposes that they marry each other to placate their families, who have been pestering them about being unmarried in their early 30s. Despite being strangers, Sumi accepts.

After returning from their honeymoon, Shardul and Sumi move into police quarters, carrying on the appearance of being a heterosexual couple. Sumi begins dating Rimjhim, a woman who works at a medical clinic and is rejected by her family after coming out. Rimjhim moves into Sumi and Shardul's apartment, forcing them to lie to multiple people that Rimjhim is a cousin. Sumi reveals to Rimjhim her desire to raise a child. Sometime later, Shardul is assigned to patrol a Pride protest—a gay "wedding"—and meets Guru, a famed criminal lawyer who is proudly out. They begin dating, and Shardul introduces Guru to both Sumi and Rimjhim.

Later, Shardul and Sumi visit Shardul's family for Diwali. Shardul's relatives interrogate the couple about why they have not yet had a child, and Shardul lies to his brother-in-law that Sumi is infertile. The next day, Shardul's family tricks Sumi into taking a fertility test, which has normal results. Shardul's mother moves in with the couple to make sure they have a physical relationship; Rimjhim temporarily moves out. Sumi lies to her mother-in-law that it is Shardul who is infertile, providing falsified test results from the clinic where Rimjhim works. The two families agree that, given the situation, the couple should adopt instead, which leaves Sumi overjoyed. Sumi and Shardul apply to an adoption agency.

One day, Shardul's mother accidentally walks in on Sumi and Rimjhim in bed and reveals Sumi's sexuality to both families. Shardul asks Sumi not to reveal his sexual orientation to their families. Sumi's mother and brother insult and reject her, while her father remains silent. Shardul visits his family, who are also furious. At first, he simply defends Sumi to them, and then, in a show of solidarity, comes out himself. Although several of his relatives shun him, his mother is accepting. Back home, Shardul is again assigned to patrol a Pride parade, but this time he puts on a rainbow mask, coming out to his co-workers. Sumi and Shardul plan to divorce, but learn that they have been approved for adoption, and decide to stay married so that they can raise the child.

One year later, Shardul and Sumi sit for an adoption ritual at their apartment, with Rimjhim included as a third parent. Many of their family members, but not all, are also in attendance. Shardul's superior and his wife—still unaware of the couple's secret—arrive unexpectedly, prompting Rimjhim to leave Sumi's side. Sumi's father motions for Rimjhim to sit back down, telling her that "a mother must be present at the ceremony." Shardul then invites Guru to sit beside him. The superior, confused, moves to leave, but his wife stops him.

== Cast ==
- Rajkummar Rao as Shardul Thakur, a policeman
- Bhumi Pednekar as Suman ''Sumi'' Singh, a physical education teacher
- Gulshan Devaiah as Advocate Guru Narayan, Shardul's boyfriend
- Chum Darang as Rimjhim Jongkey, Suman's girlfriend
- Sheeba Chaddha as Mrs. Thakur, Shardul's mother
- Seema Pahwa as Shardul's tayi ji
- Loveleen Mishra as Mrs. Singh, Suman's mother
- Nitesh Pandey as Prem Singh, Suman's father
- Vyom Yadav as Naman Singh, Suman's brother
- Abhay Joshi as Dehradun DSP
- Durga Sharma as DSP's wife
- Shireesh Dobriyal as Shardul's taya ji
- Priyanka Charan as Rekha, Shardul's cousin
- Shashi Bhushan as Dr. Anoop Parihar, Rekha's husband
- Nutan Sinha as Nishita, Shardul's cousin
- Archana Patel as Vineeta, Shardul's cousin
- Sarita Rana as Mahila Thana SHO
- Nindhi Bhati as Naaznin Baig, the police constable
- Krishan Kumar as Sirohi, the police constable
- Gurleen Kaur as Urvashi
- Ananya Gaur as Pihu
- Chetan Dhawan as Rajeev Paddisetti aka Raju
- Karuna Prakash as Suman's Priya Mausi
- Babita Anand as Kusum, Priya Mausi's Friend
- Mitisha Arora as Sarita, Shardul's cousin
- Arti Shahi as Udita, Shardul's cousin
- Prabhu Bhatt as Priyanshu
- Deepak Arora as Kabir, Shardul's ex-boyfriend
- Apeksha Porwal as Komal, Suman's ex-girlfriend
- Ritesh Singh as Aariv Dimri, Young Constable

== Production ==
The first schedule was wrapped on 25 February. The film was wrapped up on 6 March 2021.

== Soundtrack ==
Badhaai Do

Soundtrack album by Amit Trivedi, Tanishk Bagchi, Ankit Tiwari and Khamosh Shah
- Released: 1 February 2022
- Genre: Feature film soundtrack
- Length: 48:50
- Language: Hindi
- Label: Zee Music Company
External audio
- Badhaai Do Jukebox on YouTube

The music of film was composed by Amit Trivedi, Tanishk Bagchi, Ankit Tiwari and Khamosh Shah while lyrics written by Varun Grover, Vayu, Anurag Bhumia, Azeem Shirazi and Anvita Dutt.

Track listing
No.	Title	Lyrics	Music	Singer(s)	Length
1.	"Badhaai Do - Title Track"	Vayu	Tanishk Bagchi	Nakash Aziz, Rajnigandha Shekhawat, Raja Sagoo	2:53
2.	"Atak Gaya"	Varun Grover	Amit Trivedi	Arijit Singh, Rupali Moghe	3:19
3.	"Atak Gaya" (Acoustic)	Varun Grover	Amit Trivedi	Amit Trivedi	3:10
4.	"Hum Thay Seedhe Saadhe"	Varun Grover	Amit Trivedi	Raj Barman	4:24
5.	"Hum Thay Seedhe Saadhe" (Female Version)	Varun Grover	Amit Trivedi	Shashaa Tirupati	4:24
6.	"Gol Gappa"	Anvita Dutt	Amit Trivedi	Neha Kakkar, Amit Trivedi	3:39
7.	"Bandi Tot"	Anurag Bhomia	Ankit Tiwari	Ankit Tiwari, Nikhita Gandhi	3:33
8.	"Hum Rang Hai"	Varun Grover	Amit Trivedi	Shashaa Tirupati, Nakash Aziz, Amit Trivedi	4:19
9.	"Hum Thay Seedhe Saadhe"	Varun Grover	Amit Trivedi	Abhay Jodhpurkar	4:24
10.	"Maange Manzooriyan" (Female Version)	Azeem Shirazi	Khamosh Shah	Maalavika Manoj	4:18
11.	"Maange Manzooriyan" (Male Version)	Azeem Shirazi	Khamosh Shah	Abhay Jodhpurkar	4:18
12.	"Atak Gaya" (Abhijeet Version)	Varun Grover	Amit Trivedi	Abhijeet Srivastava, Rupali Moghe	3:19
13.	"Atak Gaya" (Palak Muchhal Version)	Varun Grover	Amit Trivedi	Palak Muchhal	2:50
Total length:					48:50

== Reception ==
=== Box office ===
Badhaai Do earned ₹1.65 crore at the domestic box office on its opening day. On the second day, the film collected ₹2.72 crore. On the third day, the film collected ₹3.45 crore, taking total weekend domestic collection to ₹7.82 crore.

As of 10 March 2022, the film grossed ₹24.55 crore in India and ₹3.78 crore overseas, for a worldwide gross collection of ₹28.33 crore.

=== Critical response ===
On the review aggregator website Rotten Tomatoes, 94% of 18 critics' reviews are positive, with an average rating of 6.9/10.

Rachana Dubey of The Times of India gave the film 4/5 and wrote, "Badhaai Do attempts to normalise the big-screen depiction of the gay and lesbian community and their romantic relationships. The film sensitively portrays the immense loneliness and sense of isolation that a gay person feels, especially when they lack a window to communicate openly with their family, and are forced to deal with issues on their own." Prathyush Parasuraman of Firstpost gave the film a rating of 4/5 and wrote, "Badhaai Do is largely, and rightfully preoccupied with the sexuality of the characters, characters who are not paragons but people, they burp and fart and have loose anger and dark circles." Devesh Sharma of Filmfare gave the film a rating of 4/5 and wrote, "The film makes a point that all kinds of love exists in the world and we shouldn't just pick one colour out of the rainbow but embrace the whole spectrum."

Saibal Chatterjee of NDTV gave 3.5 out of 5 and wrote, "The film unequivocally champions the cause of individuality and inclusivity while delivering an engaging story that is funny, thought-provoking and intriguingly angular in one fell swoop." Zoom gave the film a rating of 3.5/5 and wrote, "Rajkummar Rao, Bhumi Pednekar and team shoulder this bold film to show that 'love is love.'" Stutee Ghosh of The Quint gave the film a rating of 3/5 and wrote, "Badhaai Do Has Solid Performances, But Seems Overeager to Impress." Mohar Basu of Mid-Day gave the film a rating of 3/5 and wrote, "Badhaai Do is an honest effort in the right direction, and one of the reasons it works is because it makes you wonder why the law doesn't allow members of LGBTQiA+ community to marry and have children." Shantanu Ray Chaudhuri of The Free Press Journal gave the film a rating of 3/5 and wrote, "the film is eminently watchable, thanks in no mean manner to the two lead actors and the occasional throwaway line like being a lesbian 'hamare life ka hissa hai, puri life thodi na hai.'"

Pinkvilla gave the film a rating of 3/5 and wrote, "Badhaai Do strives to start a conversation but shines light on the actuality that we have a long way to go by holding a mirror to the society." Sukanya Verma of Rediff gave the film a rating of 3/5 and wrote, "Rajkummar Rao is solid in what we've come to recognise as strictly Ayushmann Khurrana territory." Ankita Bhandari of Zee News gave the film 2.5 out of 5 stars and wrote, "'Badhaai Ho' appears to be just another take on LGBTQ+ issues, this time adding the adoption angle to the otherwise commonplace matter of coming out of the closet and making your families understand." Shubhra Gupta of Indian Express gave the film 2.5 out of 5 stars and wrote, "'Badhaai Do' falls into the same trap films with 'brave subjects' gravitate towards." Monika Rawal Kukreja of The Hindustan Times wrote, "Rajkummar Rao is in full form and on point as a gay cop. Bhumi Pednekar, too, delivers an excellent performance."
