= Miss Earth India 2017 =

- Date: October 5, 2017
- Venue: Hotel Sahara Star, Mumbai
- Broadcaster: Colors Infinity
- Placements: 1
- Winner: Shaan Suhas Kumar

Miss India Earth was declared in a private ceremony where Miss India Earth Air 2016 Shaan Suhas Kumar was declared as Miss India for Miss Earth 2017.

== Results ==
=== Placements ===
| Placement | Contestant |
|---|---|
| Miss India Earth 2017 | Shaan Suhas Kumar |

== Crossover ==
- Femina Miss India Bhopal 2016 (Finalist)
- India's Top Model 2016 (Winner)

Shaan Suhas Kumar
