= Natasha Suri =

Indian actress, model and Miss World India

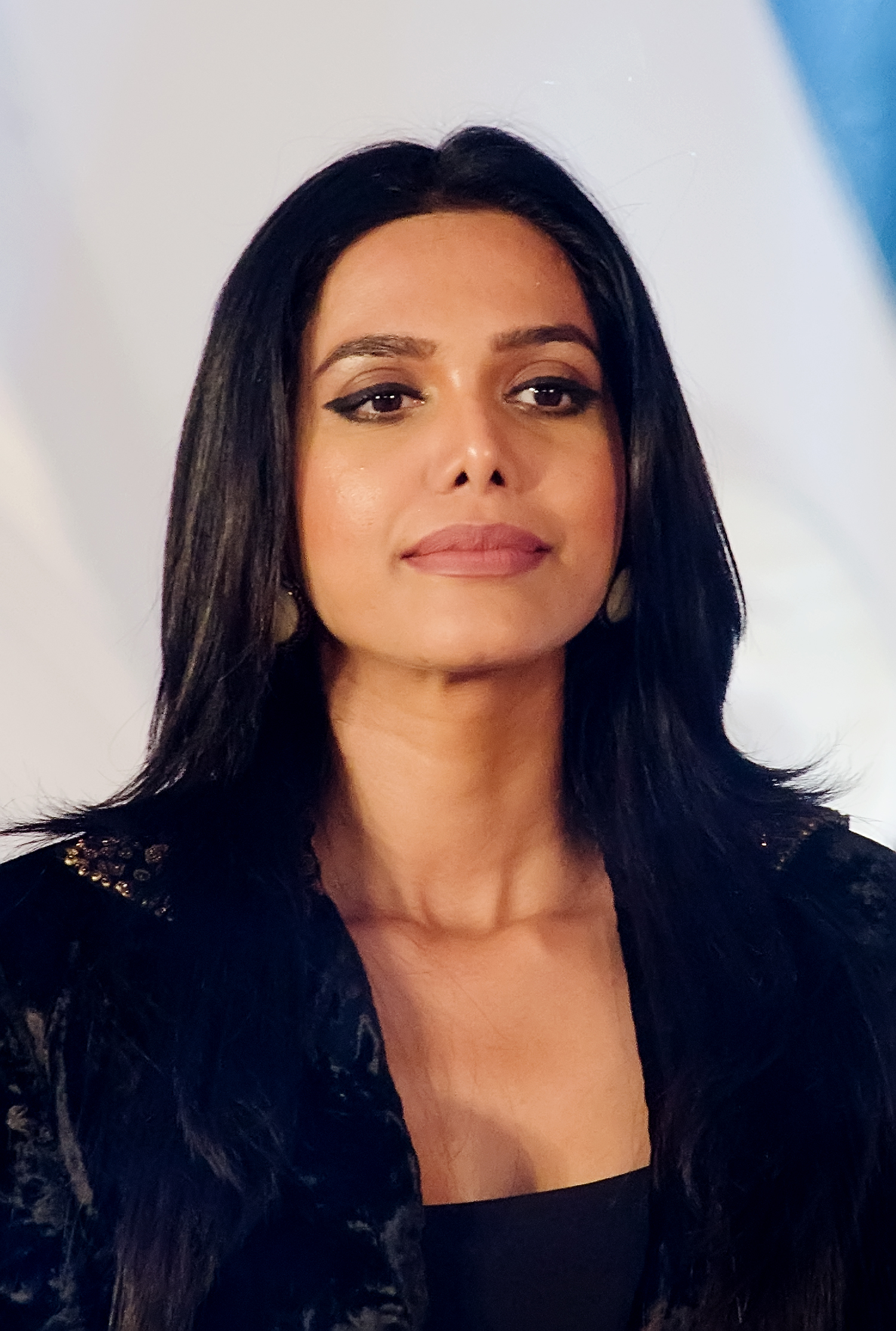
- Born: 15 May 1989 (age 37); Mumbai, Maharashtra, India
- Education: Jai Hind College, Mumbai, India
- Height: 5 ft 8 in (1.73 m)
- Beauty pageant titleholder
- Title: Femina Miss India World 2006; Miss Maharashtra Get Gorgeous-I Supermodel of India Navy Queen
- Hair color: Black
- Eye color: Black
- Major competitions: Femina Miss India 2006 (Femina Miss India World 2006); Miss Maharashtra (Winner); Get Gorgeous-I Supermodel of India (Winner); Navy Queen (Winner); Miss World 2006 (Top 17)
- Website: www.natashasuri.in

Natasha Suri is an Indian Actress, Supermodel, TV Host and Former Miss World India. She won the Femina Miss World India title in 2006 and further represented India at the prestigious Miss World Pageant in Poland where she placed in the top 10 in finals.

== Career ==
Natasha's latest Hindi film 'Tipppsy' released on the 10th of May 2024 in cinemas pan India. Her Bollywood filmDangerous starring Bipasha Basu, Karan Singh Grover and herself was released on August 14, 2020, where she played 'Gauri'. Her Hindi film Virgin Bhanupriya, where she portrayed Shonali, released in July 2020. Suri debuted as an actor with the superhit Malayalam film King Liar with Dileep and Madonna in 2016. She played the mystery woman in the popular webseries Inside Edge on Amazon Prime in 2018. She featured in Indian Popstar Mika Singh's music video Tum Jo Mil Gaye Ho and in Jazzy B and Apache Indian's music video Dil Mangdi.

Before winning Miss India, she won several other beauty contests like the Navy Queen, Miss Maharashtra, and Get Gorgeous-1 on Channel V's National Supermodel Hunt. Suri is a popular TV host, having hosted more than a dozen shows. She hosted Cell Guru on NDTV India and the luxury and lifestyle show Velvet. She then co-hosted Big Switch season 3. She hosted another popular youth reality show, SuperDude and Live Out Loud on UTV Bindass. She hosted the fashion-based show Style Police on UTV Bindass.

Suri modelled for designers such as Tarun Tahiliani, Rohit Bal, Suneet Varma, Ritu Kumar, Hemant Trivedi, Neeta Lulla.

Suri debuted as a fashion model at Rome Fashion Week, subsequently modelling at Dubai Fashion Week, Amazon India Fashion Weeks, and Lakme Fashion Weeks for more than five seasons. She walked the runway for Indian designers in over 1000 ramp shows. She walked the ramp as a showstopper for several designers.

As a photographic model, Natasha was a cover model for periodicals such as Femina, Elle, Top Gear, Maxim, Avante Garde Life, Lifestyle & Luxury, Time & Style, Fitness First, Time Out, Fashion You Intimate, Brides Now, Models & Trends, and Smart Photography.

Suri was listed on Maxim's list of the 100 hottest women in 2016. She was appointed Tourism Ambassador of Mauritius in 2007, receiving the Friends of Mauritius accolade from the country's Deputy Prime Minister. In 2006, the President of Sri Lanka congratulated her for her role as an Indian ambassador during her tenure as Miss India. In 2012, she was guest of honour at the Seychelles India National Parade. In 2008, she was conferred the Pillar of Hindustan award for her achievements in the fashion and beauty industries.

=== Beauty pageants won ===
- 2005: Navy Queen: winner
- 2005: Miss Maharashtra: winner
- 2004: Get Gorgeous-1: winner
- 2006: Miss India World winner; Miss Beautiful Smile; Miss Personality
- 2006: Miss World: Semifinalist, Miss Best Body(3rd), Best Designer Gown, Miss Talent (top 5)

Suri is a family oriented person. She is ethnically half Punjabi and half Telugu. Her father is Mr Rajan Suri and mother Mrs Radha Suri. She has two sisters Rupali and Soniya. Rupali is a known TV Host and Actress. And Soniya is a fashion designer with her own fashion label under her belt. Natasha lost her mom in 2017 to a prolonged illness. She was closest to her mother and considered her mom to be her backbone and biggest strength. Suri was raised in an all women's family and rose to glory and strength from challenging times in her childhood. She is an epitome of courage, grace and humility. Her life mantra is "Fall down seven, Get up eight". Natasha is a firm believer in God and is deeply spiritual as a person. She is a nationalist and a philanthropist having participated in various social causes.

== Filmography ==
Year	Title	Role(s)	Language	Notes	Ref.
2016	King Liar	Natasha	Malayalam		
2017	Inside Edge	Mystery Lady	Hindi	Web series on Amazon Prime	
2018	Baa Baaa Black Sheep	Kamya	Hindi		
2020	Virgin Bhanupriya	Sonali	Hindi	Released on ZEE5	
2020	Dangerous	Gauri	Hindi	Web series on MX Player	
2024	Tipppsy	Tanya	Hindi		

Awards and achievements
Preceded by (India) Sindhura Gadde	Femina Miss India World; 2006	Succeeded by (India) Sarah-Jane Dias
