= Miss Rajasthan =

Indian Beauty pageant

- Formation: 1999
- Type: Beauty pageant
- Headquarters: Jaipur
- Location: Rajasthan, India
- Official language: Hindi
- Founder: Yogesh Mishra
- Key people: Yogesh Mishra; Nimisha Mishra
- Parent organization: Fusion Group
- Website: https://missrajasthan.org/

Miss Rajasthan is an Indian state beauty pageant held annually in Rajasthan, India. The Fusion Group has been organizing the beauty pageant.

Miss Rajasthan is not affiliated with Femina which has since 2017 introduced a new format for the selection of contestants for the Femina Miss India national beauty pageant. Femina holds a separate audition to crown a Femina Miss India Rajasthan winner to represent the state of Rajasthan at Femina Miss India.

== History ==
Miss Rajasthan is organised by the Fusion Group, an event company based in Jaipur, whose directors Yogesh Mishra and Nimisha Mishra are the pageant's founders.

Early winners of the title include television actress Juhi Parmar, who won the pageant in 1999 before going on to play the lead role in the television series Kumkum – Ek Pyara Sa Bandhan.

Participation has grown in recent editions. More than 5,400 women applied for the 2023 edition, about 5,000 registered online in 2025, and around 6,500 took part in 2026, from which 28 finalists were selected. The 2020 edition's grand finale was held in January 2021.

The Fusion Group also organises the international pageant Miss Ocean World, first held in 2020.

=== Notable alumni ===
- Juhi Parmar, Miss Rajasthan 1999, is a television actress known for the title role in Kumkum – Ek Pyara Sa Bandhan and for winning Bigg Boss 5.
- Priyan Sain, first runner-up at Miss Rajasthan 2022, won Miss Earth India 2023 and placed in the Top 20 at Miss Earth 2023.
- Vaishnavi Sharma, Miss Rajasthan 2023, was selected as Femina Miss India Rajasthan 2024.
- Aruna Beniwal, first runner-up at Miss Rajasthan 2019, became VLCC Femina Miss India Rajasthan 2020.
- Mittali Kaur, a Miss Rajasthan 2019 finalist, represented India at Miss Intercontinental 2021 in Egypt.

== Titleholders ==
Edition	Miss Rajasthan	1st Runner Up	2nd Runner Up	Ref.
2026	Shreeja Gupta	Vanshika Nunia	Shagun Rathore	
2025	Twinkle Purohit	Meenakshi Chappola	Rishita Kashiva	
2024	Harshika Batra	Arnika Jain	Khushi Belawala	
2023	Vaishnavi Sharma	Akanksha Choudhary	Orjala	
2022	Tarushee Rai	Priyan Sain	Paridhi Sharma	
2021	Mansi Rathore	Kashish Ashwani	Anjali Jodha	
2020	Khushi Ajwani	Garima Wadhwa	Sushmita Thukran	
2019	Kanchan Khatana	Aruna Beniwal	Mansi Bainada	
2018	Aanchal Bohra	Juhi Vyas	Anshika Govil	
2017	Simran Sharma	Aparna Jadon	Mehak Rathore	
2016	Geetannjli Singh	Kanu Parashar		
2015	Komal Mahecha			
2004-2014	No data available			
2003	Poonam Goud			
2002	No data available			
2001	Garima Agarwal			
2000	No data available			
1999	Juhi Parmar			

== Events ==
=== Miss Rajasthan 2026 ===
The pageant held in Jaipur, Rajasthan.

Result	Contestant
Miss Rajasthan 2026	Shreeja Gupta
1st Runner Up	Vanshika Nunia
2nd Runner Up	Shagun Rathore

=== Miss Rajasthan 2025 ===
The pageant held in Jaipur, Rajasthan.

Result	Contestant
Miss Rajasthan 2025	Twinkle Purohit
1st Runner Up	Meenakshi Chappola
2nd Runner Up	Rishita Kashiva

=== Miss Rajasthan 2024 ===
The pageant held in Jaipur, Rajasthan.

Final results
Result	Contestant
Miss Rajasthan 2024	Harshika Batra
1st Runner Up	Arnika Jain
2nd Runner Up	Khushi Belawala

=== Miss Rajasthan 2023 ===
The pageant held in Jaipur, Rajasthan. Also auditions held in Jaipur Rajasthan.

Final results
Result	Contestant	Note(s)
Miss Rajasthan 2023	Vaishnavi sharma	Femina Miss India Rajasthan 2024
1st Runner Up	Akanksha choudhary	Miss Universe India 2025 national finalist
2nd Runner Up	Orjala	

=== Miss Rajasthan 2022 ===
The pageant was held on 6 August 2022 at Birla Auditorium, Jaipur, Rajasthan. Tarushee Rai from Jaipur was crowned the winner at the end of the event.

Final results

Result	Contestant	Note(s)
Miss Rajasthan 2022	Tarushee Rai	
1st Runner Up	Priyan Sain	Miss Earth India 2023
2nd Runner Up	Paridhi Sharma	

=== Miss Rajasthan 2021 ===
The pageant was held on 5 October 2021 at Birla Auditorium, Jaipur, Rajasthan. Mansi Rathore was crowned the winner at the end of the event.

Final results

Result	Contestant
Miss Rajasthan 2021	Mansi Rathore
1st Runner Up	Kashish Ashwani
2nd Runner Up	Anjali Jodha

=== Miss Rajasthan 2020 ===
Result	Contestant	Note(s)
Miss Rajasthan 2020	Khushi Ajwani	finalist of Campus Princess 2020

=== Miss Rajasthan 2019 ===
Result	Contestant	Note(s)
Miss Rajasthan 2019	Kanchan Khatana	Miss Diva Universe 2020 state finalist
1st Runner Up	Aruna Beniwal	VLCC Femina Miss India Rajasthan 2020
4th Runner Up	Mittali Kaur	Miss Intercontinental India 2021

=== Miss Rajasthan 2018 ===
Result	Contestant
Miss Rajasthan 2018	Aanchal bohra

=== Miss Rajasthan 2017 ===
Result	Contestant	Note(s)
Miss Rajasthan 2017	Simran Sharma	represented India at Miss Grand International 2020

=== Miss Rajasthan 2016 ===
Result	Contestant
Miss Rajasthan 2016	Geetannjli Singh

=== Miss Rajasthan 2015 ===
Result	Contestant
Miss Rajasthan 2015	Komal Mahecha
