= Aap Se Mausiiquii =

Studio album by Himesh Reshammiya

Studio album by Himesh Reshammiya
- Released: 5 December 2016
- Recorded: 2016
- Studio: T-Series; and HR Musik Limited
- Genre: Indipop; Dance-pop; EDM; Rock; Hard Rock
- Length: 51:53
- Label: T-Series; and HR Musik Limited
- Producer: T-Series

Himesh Reshammiya chronology
'Aap Kaa Surroor' (2006)	Aap Se Mausiiquii (2016)	Surroor 2021 (2021)

Singles from Aap Se Mausiiquii
- 1. "Aap Se Mausiiquii" Released: 3 November 2016; 2. "Menu Kehn De" Released: 29 November 2016

Aap Se Mausiiquii (transl. Your Music) is the second album by Himesh Reshammiya, with lyrics by Manoj Muntashir. While the title track and "Menu Kehn De" were released in November and the whole album was released on 5 December 2016, by T-Series, Amitabh Bachchan and HR Musik Limited.

== Track listing ==
All songs were composed by Himesh Reshammiya with lyrics written by Manoj Muntashir.

=== Original ===
No.	Title	Singer(s)	Length
1.	"Aap Se Mausiquii"	Himesh Reshammiya	5:01
2.	"Menu Kehn de"	Himesh Reshammiya	4:17
3.	"Tonight"	Himesh Reshammiya	5:06
4.	"So Much in Love"	Himesh Reshammiya	4:45
5.	"Every Night and Day"	Himesh Reshammiya, Iulia Vantur	5:10
6.	"Couple Photo"	Himesh Reshammiya, Neha Kakkar	4:33
7.	"Trippy"	Himesh Reshammiya, Neha Kakkar, Kiran Kamath	4:30
8.	"Soni"	Himesh Reshammiya	5:58
9.	"Thuglife"	Himesh Reshammiya, Neha Kakkar, DJ Akbar Sami	4:45
10.	"Teri Arziyaan"	Himesh Reshammiya	6:08
Total length:			51:55

=== Remixes ===
No.	Title	Singer(s)	Length
1.	"Aap Se Mausiquii" (Reprise)	Himesh Reshammiya, Kiran Kamath	3:19
2.	"Aap Se Mausiquii" (International mix)	Himesh Reshammiya, DJ Chetas	4:58
3.	"Aap Se Mausiquii" (Remix)	Himesh Reshammiya, DJ Akbar Sami	3:39
4.	"Aap Se Mausiquii" (Tropical mix)	Himesh Reshammiya, DJ Aqeel	6:08
5.	"Menu Kehn De" (Unplugged)	Himesh Reshammiya	5:05
6.	"Menu Kehn De" (Remix)	Himesh Reshammiya, Kiran Kamath	4:54
7.	"Tonight" (Remix)	Himesh Reshammiya, Kiran Kamath	4:22
8.	"So Much in Love" (Remix)	Himesh Reshammiya, Kiran Kamath	3:34
9.	"Every Night and Day" (Remix)	Himesh Reshammiya, Iulia Vantur, Kiran Kamath	4:42
10.	"Soni" (Lounge Mix)	Himesh Reshammiya, Kiran Kamath	5:20
11.	"Teri Arziyaan" (Lounge Mix)	Himesh Reshammiya, Kiran Kamath	5:06
12.	"Couple Photo" (Remix)	Himesh Reshammiya, Kiran Kamath	2:55
Total length:			48:16

== Music videos ==
- "Aap Se Mausiquii" - The first video song of this album was the title track. There is also a trailer of this track. The music video features Reshammiya himself and Puja Bose as a blind pianist girl who is the love interest of Reshammiya.
- "Menu Kehn De" - The video depicts the ups and downs of a love relationship. The video features Reshammiya and model Alankrita Sahai. The song is most viewed song of this album.
- "Every Night and Day" - The song marked the debut of Romanian singer and actor Iulia Vantur. There was a making video also released.
- "Tonight" - This video song features Reshammiya, Alankrita Sahai and model Don Pablo. The song has 3.1 million views.
- "So Much in Love" - The rock song depicts Reshammiya and Alankrita Sahai as his girlfriend.
- "Trippy" - The song features Fan (film) actress Waluscha De Sousa and Reshammiya and Neha Kakkar also featured as singer.

== Critical reception ==
Joginder Tuteja of MovieTalkies.com gave the album 4.5 out of 5.

Professional ratings
Review scores
Source	Rating
Joginder Tuteja	4.5/5 stars
Santa Banta	4.5/5 stars
