= Alankrita Sahai =

Indian beauty queen

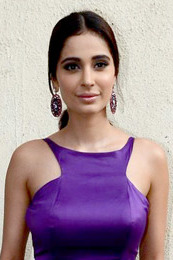
- Sahai in 2016
- Born: 14 April 1994 (age 32); New Delhi, India
- Education: Gargi College; University of Southern California
- Occupation: Actress
- Height: 1.70 m (5 ft 7 in)

Alankrita Sahai, an actor and super model was crowned Miss India in 2014-2015, was the first Indian to win seven titles at the Miss Earth competition. Her career began with a music album featuring three songs, produced by Himesh Reshammiya and launched by Amitabh Bachchan, Salman Khan, and T-Series. The hit song "Kehta Hai Pal Pal Tumse," which was released in 2017, was one of Sahai's notable tracks.

Transitioning to film, Alankrita starred in "Love Per Square Foot," produced by Ronnie Screwvala. She also starred in "Namaste England" with Arjun Kapoor, directed by Vipul Shah. The Film Band Of Maharaja's made it to the Oscars Coveted Contention List. Additionally, she collaborated with Jio on a project.

Alankrita has participated in over 250 campaigns, featuring in numerous television commercials for prominent brands such as White Tone, Wild Stone, BKT Tyres (with Sunny Deol), Samsung, Axis Bank, Pantene, RMKV Sarees, L'Oréal Matrix, Fab India, Soch, and Nissan. She is also a TEDx speaker and has received multiple awards for her contributions, including recognition from Rotary and the World Health Organization (WHO). For five consecutive years, she has been featured in India's Most Desirable list.

Her song "Coka" has garnered over 554 million views, while another collaboration with Karan Aujala in 5-7, Jassi Gill, Denny, Akhil Sachdeva and other notable singers have also gained significant attention amongst her other successful songs.

== Early life and career ==
Alankrita Sahai was born in New Delhi, India. She did her schooling from the American Embassy School in Delhi and from Khaitan Public School, Noida. For her higher studies she was enrolled in Gargi College, University of Delhi and University of Southern California.

Her first project was with Himesh Reshammiya in a music album launched by Amitabh Bachchan, Salman Khan and T-Series. She worked in a psychological thriller 'The Incomplete Man' in 2022.

She is the first Indian to win 7 titles at the Miss Earth pageant held in the Philippines. In 2018, she made her acting debut with the Netflix romantic comedy film called Love per Square Foot. In the same year, she played a role of Alisha in the film Namaste England. Alankrita completed two films a comedy thriller TIPPPSY and an unnamed South Indian film.

== Filmography ==
=== Film ===
Year	Film	Role	Director	Notes
2018	Love per Square Foot	Raashi Khurrana	Anand Tiwari	Netflix movie Debut film
2018	Namaste England	Alisha Sharma	Vipul Shah	
2024	Tipppsy	Pony	Deepak Tijori	

=== Music videos ===
Year	Album	Song	Co-Star
2016	Aap Se Mausiiquii	"Menu Kehn De" So much in love Tonight	Himesh Reshammiya

Coka - Sukh E Musical Doctorz

5-7 - Karan Aujala 

Allah Ve - Jassi Gill

Lalala- Kulwinder Billa

Raaz Apne Dil Ke - Rekha Bhardwaj

Funk Billo - Sukh E ft Musahib

P Paa K - Denny And Nikita Gandhi (Best Item song of Alankrita)

Attention -Denny And Mandy Gill

Tere Bin 2.0 Akhil Sachdeva

Mote peg 2 Sumit Parta

== Philanthropy ==
Sahai assisted people during Covid-19 by providing oxygen cylinders and food supplies.

Awards and achievements
Preceded by Sobhita Dhulipala	Miss Earth India; 2014	Succeeded by Aaital Khosla
Preceded by Gurleen Grewal	Miss Diva; 1st Runner Up; 2014	Succeeded by Natasha Assadi
