= Daniela Stucan =

Argentine fashion model

Daniela Alejandra Stucan is an Argentine fashion model and beauty pageant titleholder who was crowned as Miss Earth Argentina 2001. She competed in the first edition of the international Miss Earth 2001 beauty pageant produced by Carousel Productions. She won the title of Miss Fire 2001.

She also competed in Miss Universe 2007 held in Mexico City, Mexico representing Argentina but was unplaced.

== Miss Earth 2001 ==
Stucan was crowned Miss Earth Argentina 2001. She went on to represent Argentina in the first edition of Miss Earth beauty pageant, where the final coronation night was held on October 28, 2001 at the University of the Philippines Theater in Quezon City, Philippines.

The pageant, called "Beauty for a Cause", put emphasis on speeches alongside the typical beauty pageant events, since the Miss Earth winner serves as the spokesperson for the Miss Earth Foundation, the United Nations Environment Programme (UNEP) and other environmental organizations.

Stucan ended up the title of Miss Fire 2001, equivalent to third runner-up. The pageant, which promotes environmental awareness, was won by Catharina Svensson of Denmark and participated by 42 delegates representing various countries in the world.
