= Gargi College =

College in Delhi, India

Coordinates: 28°33′17″N 77°13′06″E

- Other name: GC
- Type: Public
- Established: 1967 ; 57 years ago
- Accreditation: NAAC (A+ Grade)
- Academic affiliations: University of Delhi
- Principal: Dr. Vandna Luthra (acting)
- Faculty: 120
- Students: 4,000 +
- Location: Delhi, India
- Campus: Urban
- Website: gargicollege.in

Gargi College is a college affiliated to the University of Delhi. It was established in the year 1967 and offers education in Arts and Humanities, Commerce, Science and Education for women. Gargi College has been honoured with Star College Status by Department of Biotechnology, Government of India.

== History ==
Gargi College was established in the year 1967.

Gargi College was named after an enlightened woman named Gargi Vachaknavi, figuring in the Brihadaranyaka Upanishada of the Vedic Age.

== Campus ==
It is one of the South Campus colleges of the University of Delhi.

Gargi possesses infrastructural facilities. The whole campus is WiFi enabled and this facility is available to all students and staff members. An auditorium and seminar hall with a seating capacity of 750 and 150 respectively, exist.

- Auditorium: The auditorium can fit about 750 people including the main theatre and the mezzanine.
- Bioinformatics Infrastructure Facility: One of the two Bioinformatics Infrastructure Facility in the University of Delhi is located at Gargi College and undergraduates from any Science discipline can access the facility as per faculty guidance.
- Bookstore: There is an on-campus bookstore that sells both curriculum books and stationery for the students.
- Computer Laboratories: There are a total of 110 computers in the university across 3 computer labs.
- Food court:
- Laboratories: The university has laboratories for Botany, Chemistry, Elementary Education, Microbiology, Physics, Psychology and Zoology.
- Medical Room: All students can avail medical facilities during college hours.
- Open air theatre: An open air platform has been constructed for the students. It is often used for street play performances.
- Seminar Hall: The auditorium is accompanied by a seminar hall that can seat up to 125 people. It is used for several academic events on the university.
- Students’ Common Room
- Students' Union Room

== Academics ==
=== Academic activities ===
The college arranges inter-disciplinary seminars at national level every year. Research is encouraged even at the undergraduate level. Summer workshops are conducted regularly for science students. Students regularly make presentations in departmental activities.

The result of the last two years University examinations records 99% pass and about 45-50% first divisions. On an average about 10 students obtain positions within the top 3 of the University of Delhi and about 35 within the top 5 of the South Campus.

=== Rankings ===
Gargi College ranked 31st among colleges in India by the National Institutional Ranking Framework in 2023 and 2024. Gargi has been ranked 9th among art colleges of India according to the India Today Survey, 2016. and 7th in the Department of Sciences.

College rankings

General – India
- NIRF (Colleges) (2023): 31
- NIRF (Colleges) (2024): 31

== Student life ==
=== Sports programmes ===
Gargi College owns a sports field where students train in various sports. Its students have been selected to represent DU in state and national tournaments in Judo, Basketball, Taekwondo, Volleyball and Tennis. In 2012, Gargi students emerged as chess champions of DU and the Judo team was runner up. In 2013, the college won gold medal in athletics and Judo and emerged second in tennis tournaments of DU and volleyball team also doing well.

=== Social outreach programmes and fests ===
The NSS, NCC, Equal Opportunity Cell and Women's Development Centres of the college arrange events that sensitise Gargi's students to gender, economic and other issues. These create awareness about the social responsibility and provide the opportunity for rendering service to the society. College has several student lead society for overall development of students while giving back to the society as large. Such an society is Eco Club Avani. The 2018 Fest - Reverie was noted to be one of the biggest in Delhi University. Artists including Aman Bathla (Painter), Candice Redding and Myris (DJ), Monali Thakur (Singer), Rahul Makin (RJ) and Faridkot (Band) were present at the event.

== Notable alumni ==
- Alankrita Sahai - Miss Diva Earth 2014
- Huma Qureshi - Actress
- Sonal Chauhan - Femina Miss India Tourism 2005, Miss World Tourism 2005, model and Actress.
- Urvashi Rautela- Miss Diva 2015 and Actress
- Sanya Malhotra - Actress.
