= Aaital Khosla =

Indian model and beauty queen (born 1993)

- Born: Aaital Khosla; 3 December 1993 (age 32); Chandigarh, India
- Education: Graduation in English Honours (Punjab University); Luxury Management (London School of Fashion); St. Stephen's School, Chandigarh; MCM DAV College for Women
- Height: 170 cm (5 ft 7 in)
- Beauty pageant titleholder
- Title: Palaash National Beauty Pageant 2015; Glamanand Supermodel India 2015
- Years active: 2015 - present
- Major competitions: Glamanand Supermodel India 2015 (Winner); Miss Earth 2015 (Unplaced)

Aaital Khosla is an Indian model and beauty queen. She was crowned Glamanand Supermodel India and represented India at the Miss Earth 2015 pageant held in Vienna, Austria.

== Personal life and career ==
=== Early life and education ===
Aaital was born in Chandigarh in a business/political family. She attended St. Stephen's School, Chandigarh and later went to MCM DAV College for Women for further studies.

=== Career and beauty pageants ===
In December 2015, she competed in the Femina Miss India Delhi contest held at Hyatt Regency, Gurgaon, where she placed in the Top 6 and won "Miss Fashion Icon" sub-award. The same year she participated in the Palash National Beauty Pageant Chandigarh 2015 contest and was declared 1st Runner Up. Later, she entered the Palaash National Beauty Pageant 2015 and was crowned the eventual winner.

She competed in the second edition of Glamanand Supermodel India, the national preliminary for Miss Earth pageant in India and was crowned the winner at the conclusion of the final event held on 4 November 2015 at Courtyard Marriott Hotel in Gurgaon. Apart from winning the main title she also won three special awards at the pageant: Miss Internet, Miss Eco-Tourism and Miss Productive Beauty. She succeeded Mohini Raaj Puniya as Glamanand Supermodel India and Alankrita Sahai as Miss Earth India.

Aaital represented India at the Miss Earth 2015 pageant held in Marx Halle, Vienna, Austria.

== Controversy ==
In November 2015, Miss Earth India's video representing Miss Khosla resulted in controversy was the video showcased scenes from Mount Everest in Nepal in its depiction of the Himalayas. The video quickly gained attention and was taken down within 24 hours and a new video was uploaded. National Director clarified that the mistake was made by the videography team and that the video was removed as soon as the error was realised. Khosla later issued an apology to Nepal and the Nepalese people on her Facebook page.

Awards and achievements
Preceded by First Winner	Palaash National Beauty Pageant; 2015	Succeeded by Incumbent
Preceded by Mohini Raaj Puniya	Glamanand Supermodel India; 2015	Succeeded by Incumbent
Preceded by First Titleholder	Glamanand Miss Earth India; 2015	Succeeded by Incumbent
Preceded by Alankrita Sahai	Miss Earth India; 2015	Succeeded by Rashi Yadav
