= Miss Ocean World =

Beauty pageant

- Formation: 2020; 6 years ago
- Type: Beauty pageant
- Headquarters: Jaipur
- Location: India
- Official language: English
- Director: Yogesh Mishra
- Current titleholder: Molly-Marie Buckley ( United Kingdom )
- Parent organization: Fusion Froup

Miss Ocean World is an international Beauty pageant held annually in India. It is organised by the Fusion Group and was founded by Yogesh Mishra and Nimisha Mishra, who also organise Miss Rajasthan. The pageant focuses on themes of Ocean conservation and environmental awareness.

Since 2023, the event has been conducted mainly in India. Its format includes evening gown, swimsuit, and question–answer rounds on issues related to environmental protection.

At the 2025 edition, Evaline Neim Mohammed Salleh of South Sudan was crowned Miss Ocean World, with Parul Singh of India as the first runner-up. At the same event, Siddu Reddy Kandakatla was presented with the Global Philanthropy Award.

== Virtual editions ==
During COVID-19 pandemic it is announced virtually on 31 Dec 2020.

== Winners ==
Edition	Year	Winner	1st Runner-up	2nd Runner-up	3rd Runner-up	4th Runner-up	Venue	Entrants	Notes	Ref
1st	2020	Aranzaku Dimter Monasterio; Chile	Giuliana Obando Rabanal; Peru	Anindita Chandra; India	Laura Louise Hudson; United Kingdom	Tatiana Garcia Martinez; Spain	Virtual	45	Inaugural virtual edition; Anindita Chandra (India) won Miss Ocean World Asia and 2nd Runner-up.	
-	2021- 2022	No pageant held due to the COVID-19 pandemic								
2nd	2023	Laura Louise Hudson; United Kingdom	Adria Dinev; Bulgaria	Avanti Shroff; India	Mercy Paul; Tanzania	Lee Sumim; South Korea	Jaipur, India	13	First live international finals in India; emphasized as a milestone for the pageant.	
3rd	2024	Alisa Bogachova; Latvia	Szonja Dudik; Hungary	Azhar Zhumabekova; Kazakhstan	Fedorishcheva Tatiana; Crimea	Aigul Zaripova; Tatarstan	Jaipur, India	15	Crown-passing to successor in 2025	
4th	2025	Evaline Neem Mohammad Salleh; South Sudan	Parul Singh; India	Nikol Slynkova; Czech Republic	kurara Shigeta; Japan	Angelika Magdalena Fajcht; Poland	Jaipur, India	20	Theme: Clean Oceans. Parul Singh (India) won Miss Ocean India and 1st Runner-up.	
5th	2026	Molly-Marie Buckley; United Kingdom	Bening Fajriani; Indonesia	Heena Thakur; India	Kana Sagara; Japan	Purity Tanatswanashe Makuba; Zimbabwe	Jaipur, India	20		

Countries/Territories by number of wins
Country/Territory	Titles	Year(s)
United Kingdom	2	2023, 2026
South Sudan	1	2025
Latvia	1	2024
Chile	1	2020

Continents by number of wins
Continents	Titles	Country (Number)
Americas	1	Chile (1),
Europe	3	United Kingdom (2), Latvia (1)
Asia	0	
Africa	1	South Sudan (1)
Oceania	0	

== See also ==
- List of beauty contests
