= Carolina Yanuzzi =

Argentine model

- Born: Santiago del Estero, Argentina
- Beauty pageant titleholder
- Title: Miss Earth Argentina 2014
- Hair color: Blonde
- Eye color: Green
- Major competitions: Miss Earth Argentina 2014

Carolina Yanuzzi is an Argentinian beauty pageant title holder. She was crowned Miss Argentina 2013 and will represent Argentina at the Miss Earth 2014 Titles: Second maid of honor in queen of the students 2005, in Argentina Girl show mach, in Argentina Second national princess in miss universe 2013, in Argentina Girl "faces glam" Argentina, in miami Miss Argentina 2014, in Argentina Conrad angels Argentina 2014, in Uruguay. Queen of the turf 2014, in Argentina Miss atlantico Argentina 2015, in Uruguay Miss bikini Argentina 2015, in china
