= Glamanand Supermodel India 2015 =

- Date: November 4, 2015
- Presenters: Bhavyata Sharma; Nikhil Anand
- Venue: Courtyard Marriott Hotel
- Entrants: 12
- Placements: 7
- Winner: Aaital Khosla; Chandigarh
- Congeniality: Rasshmi Raajput; Maharashtra
- Best National Costume: Niharika Anand; New Delhi
- Photogenic: Namrata Sharma; Maharashtra
- Miss Internet: Aaital Khosla; Chandigarh

The first edition of Glamanand Supermodel India contest was held on November 4, 2015 at Courtyard Marriott in New Delhi. 21 year old model Aaital Khosla from Chandigarh was declared Glamanand Supermodel India 2015 carrying the title Miss Earth India 2015 at the conclusion of the event. Vaishnavi Patwardhan was declared 1st Runner Up and Jolly Rathod was crowned 2nd Runner Up.

Aaital Khosla represented India at Miss Earth 2015 pageant held on December 5, 2015 in the Vienna, Austria.

== Results ==
=== Placements ===
Placement	Contestant
Glamanand Miss India Earth 2015	Aaital Khosla
Glamanand Miss India International 2015	Supriya Aiman (Note: Supriya Aiman was appointed by Glamanand organization to represent India at Miss International 2015 pageant as the national contest was held after the conclusion of Miss International 2015 in Japan.)
Glamanand Miss India Tourism 2015	Sneha Jagiasi
1st Runner Up	Vashnavi Patwardhan
2nd Runner Up	Jolly Rathod
Top 7	Himani Sharma; Monali Chaudhary; Niharika Anand; Rasshmi Raajput

== Returns and Crossovers ==
- Femina Miss India Delhi
  - 2015 - Aaital Khosla
  - 2015 - Monali Chaudary
- Femina Miss India Kolkata
  - 2015 - Namrata Sharma
- Indian Princess
  - 2015 - Himani Sharma (Best Walk)
  - 2012 - Monali Chaudary (Indian Princess Tourism Queen International of the Year 2012)
- Miss Tourism International
  - 2014 - Rashmi Rajput (Top 10, Miss Photogenic, Miss KL Sogo Trendsetter)
- Miss Tourism Queen International of the Year
  - 2012 - Monali Chaudary (Top 20)
