= Shamita Singha =

Indian model

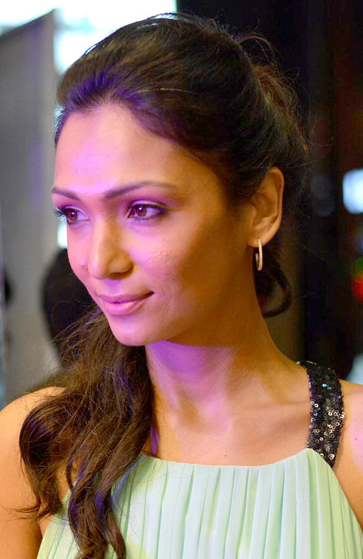
- Singha in 2013.
- Born: Shamita Singha; Mumbai, India
- Occupation: Model
- Height: 1.73 m (5 ft 8 in)
- Beauty pageant titleholder
- Title: Femina Miss India Earth 2001
- Major competitions: Femina Miss India 2001; (Miss India Earth); Miss Earth 2001; (Top 10); (Miss Personality); (Best National Costume)

Shamita Singha is an Indian fashion model, television anchor, VJ and beauty pageant titleholder. She was crowned Femina Miss Earth India 2001 and later competed in Miss Earth 2001, where she was one of the semifinalists.

== Career ==
Singha is a supermodel in India. She modelled for Levis, Electrolux, and Platinum Jewellery. She participated in fashion shows for designers like Manish Malhotra and Ritu Kumar. She appeared in a Motorola TV commercial with Indian actor and film producer, Abhishek Bachchan.

In March 2003 Singha was a judge at a fashion festival in Mumbai. She intervened when she saw a bare-chested model swagger on to the ramp with a pair of pythons entwined around his neck. She also posed next to a 40-foot killer whale in 2006 for the Kingfisher's Swimsuit Special Calendar 2007.

In August 2004, B4U Music and B4U Movies announced Singha and Sajid Khan as two new additions to its VJ bandwagon to build up the audience base.

In 2007, she began hosting the daily TV show, Maximum Style.

Singha is a wine enthusiast turned wine trainer. She took introductory & intermediate wine tasting courses and obtained WSET Level 2 certification in wine & spirits.

== Miss Earth 2001 ==
Singha was selected and crowned Miss Earth India 2001. She went on to represent India in the first Miss Earth pageant, on 28 October 2001 at the University of the Philippines Theater in Quezon City, Philippines.

== Personal life ==
Singha lives in Mumbai, India.

Singha has supported animal welfare organisations, and is a trustee on the Animal Welfare Board of India She funds the Nature and Animal Care Foundation. In a campaign against animal cruelty, Singha posed on a bed of red chillies wearing nothing for PETA Dishoom, the youth division of People for the Ethical Treatment of Animals in India, with the tagline "Spice Up Your Life – Go Vegetarian".

Awards and achievements
Preceded by None	Miss Earth India; 2001	Succeeded by Reshmi Ghosh
