= Priyan Sain =

Indian beauty pageant titleholder

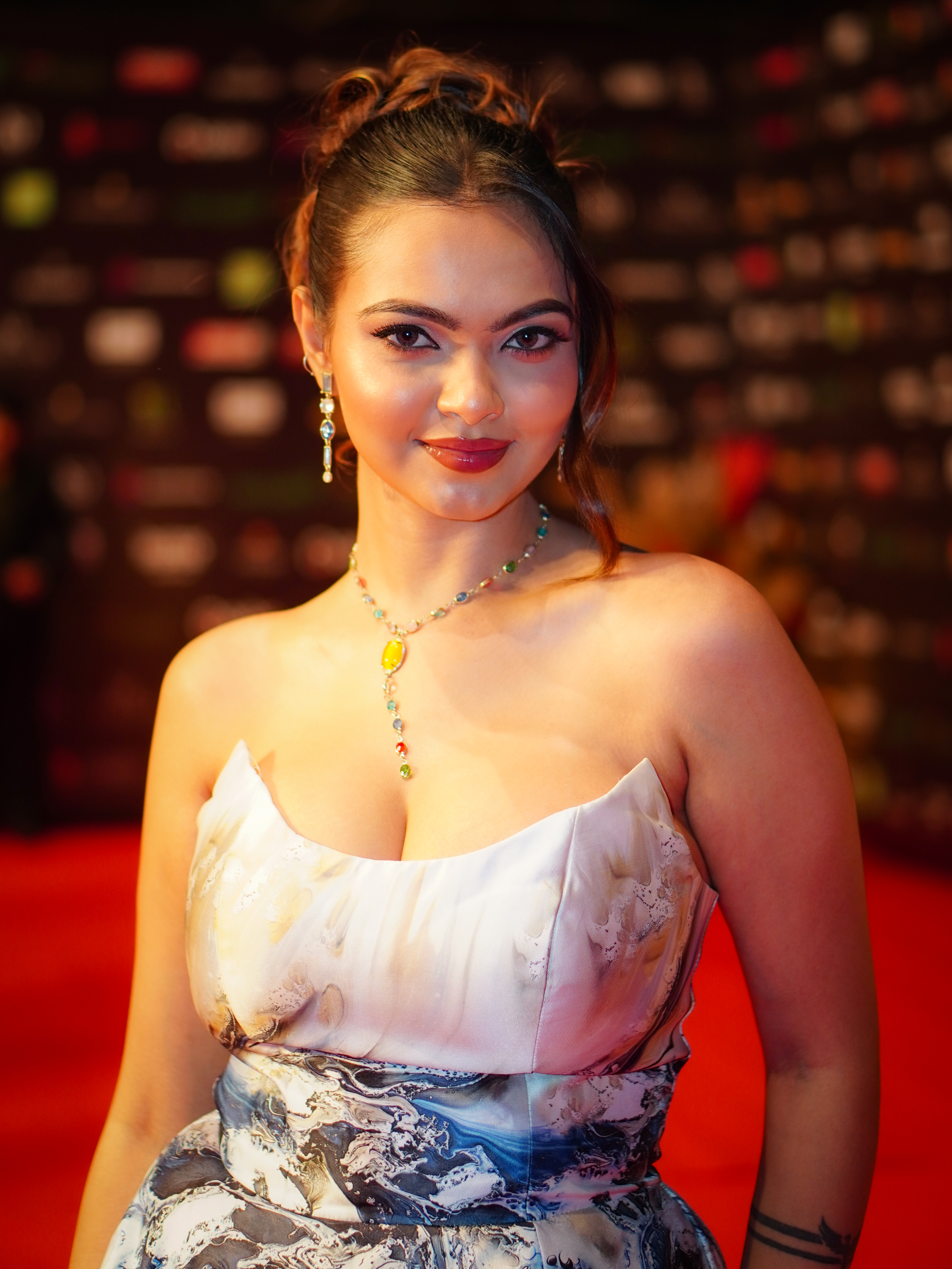
- Priyan Sain at Miss Universe India 2026
- Born: Sikar, Rajasthan, India
- Beauty pageant titleholder
- Title: Miss Earth India 2023
- Major competitions: Miss Rajasthan 2022; (1st Runner-up); Miss Divine Beauty 2023; (Winner – Miss Earth India 2023); Miss Earth 2023; (Top 20)

Priyan Sain is an Indian beauty pageant titleholder who won Miss Earth India 2023. She represented India at Miss Earth 2023 and reached the top 20, breaking India's 12 year run of unplaced contestants.

== Early life and education ==
Priyan Sain is a resident of Sikar, Rajasthan and is studying medical science. Priyan's mother is a teacher in a government school in Rajasthan and a single mother. Also she is an avid taekwondo player and dancer.

== Pageantry ==
Sain was first runner-up at Miss Rajasthan 2022.

Sain represented India at Miss Earth 2023 in Vietnam in December 2023. She reached the top 20, breaking India's 12 year run of unplaced contestants.

== Other work ==
Sain appeared in the Bhojpuri-Awadhi song titled Saiyan Mile Larkaiya.

Awards and achievements
Preceded by Vanshika Parmar	Miss Earth India; 2023	Succeeded by Gauri Gothankar
