= Miss Himalaya Pageant =

Indian beauty pageant

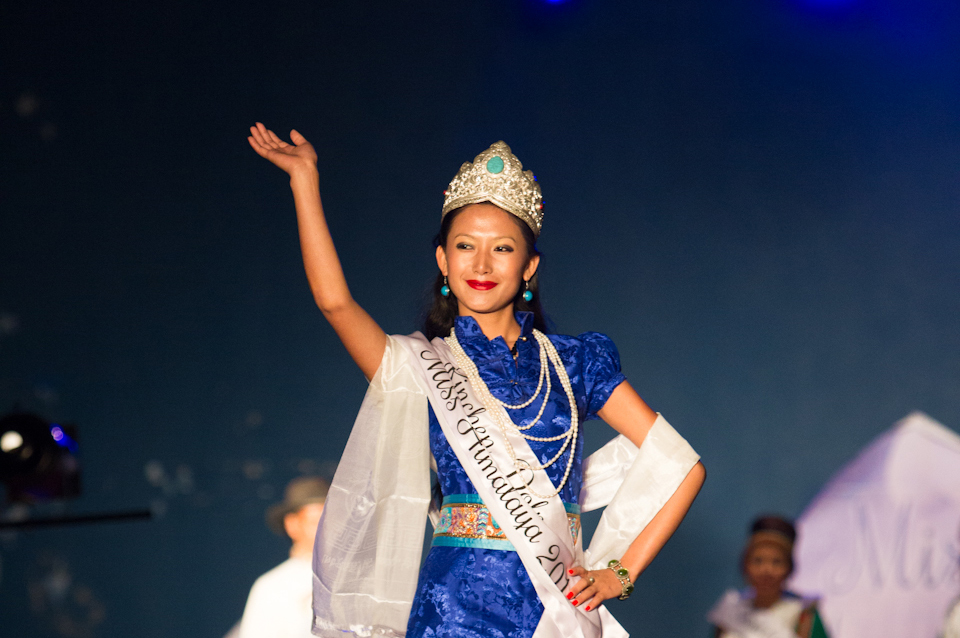
Miss Himalaya 2012 Rinchen Dolma

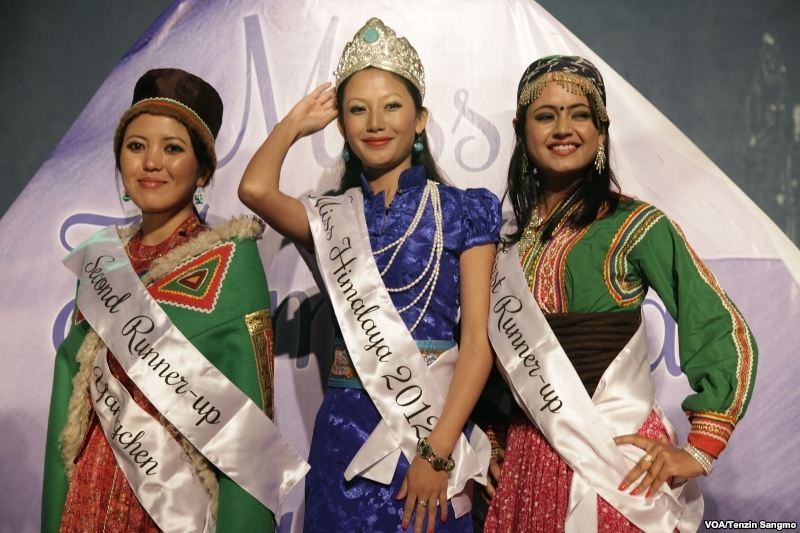
Miss Himalaya 2012 winners

The inaugural Miss Himalaya Pageant was held in McLeod Ganj, India, on 12–13 October 2012. The purpose of the annual event is "to bring women from the entire Himalayan region onto one platform to celebrate the beautiful cultures, people, and nature of the Himalayan region."

The pageant is produced and directed by Lobsang Wangyal of Lobsang Wangyal Productions, which has also been producing the Miss Tibet Pageant since 2002. Lobsang Wangyal has been producing events since 2000 "to promote art, culture, and understanding."

The idea of "Miss Himalaya" was conceived by Lobsang Wangyal in 2010, and the work for the event started soon after. The event was publicly announced on 5 June 2011.

The Pageant accepts applications from women from the entire Himalayan region—the ten Indian states of Jammu and Kashmir, Himachal Pradesh, Uttarakhand Sikkim, Arunachal Pradesh, Meghalaya, Nagaland, Manipur, Mizoram, and Tripura; the hill regions of Assam and West Bengal; and Bhutan, Nepal, and Tibet.

== Miss Himalaya 2020–2021 ==
Due to coronavirus pandemic, there were no pageants held. The organisers will announce on their website and social media pages whether they will organise pageant 2022.

== Miss Himalaya 2019 ==
Shrutika Sharma from Nainital, Uttrakhand, impressed the judges to win the crown of the Miss Himalaya Pageant 2019. Shalika Rana was named the First Runner-up and Sapna Devi was chosen the Second Runner-up. Eight contestants were tested in four rounds on the Finale Night to decide the winner. They were judged by a three-member jury. The Pageant 2019 was held on 11 and 12 October at The Club House in McLeod Ganj, India.

Miss Photogenic was won by Shalika Rana.

== Miss Himalaya 2018 ==
Ritika Sharma is Miss Himalaya 2018. The 23-year-old winner from Shimla is a medical student, also working as a radiation therapist treating cancer patients. Twenty-year-old Palak Sharma from Chamba was chosen the First Runner-up, while 24-year-old Ashima Sharma from Jammu was given the Second Runner-up place. The Miss Himalaya Pageant 2018 was held at the Tibetan Institute of Performing Arts (TIPA) in McLeod Ganj, India, on 6 October 2018.

Seven young women participated in the 2018 pageant.

== Miss Himalaya 2017 ==
The fifth iteration of Miss Himalaya pageant 2017 competition was held on 7 and 8 October in McLeod Ganj, Himachal Pradesh. Dharamshala's Preksha Rana was crowned the Miss Himalaya 2017. The competition saw a tough fight between nine finalists, eight of which hailed from Himachal Pradesh itself. The ninth was Tashi Lhamo, a Tibetan living in Nepal, who was chosen as the First Runner-up, while Palampur girl Palak Thakur was named the Second Runner-up. The event was held in TIPA in McLeod Ganj, Himachal Pradesh.

A cash prize of 1 lakh was awarded to the winner Miss Himalaya Preksha Rana while Tashi Lhamo and Palak Thakur took 50 and 25 thousand respectively. The winner of last year's Miss Himalaya Pageant Ayushi Sethi passed on the crown to the new winner Preksha Rana. Monika Negi from Rampur, Himachal Pradesh, took away the award for Miss Photogenic which was decided by public voting.

- Full 2017 contestant information

== Miss Himalaya 2016 ==
- Full 2016 contestant information

== Miss Himalaya 2015 ==
- Full 2015 contestant information

== Miss Himalaya 2014 ==
The second edition of Miss Himalaya Pageant 2014 was concluded in McLeod Ganj on Sunday night, 5 October 2014. Twenty-two-year-old environmental science student Jyoti Dogra won the pageant from among four other contestants. Shikha Sharma, a twenty-year-old BA student was declared First Runner-up, and twenty-two-year-old Dawa Dema, a management student was the Second Runner-up.

Jyoti won one lakh (100,000) rupees with the title, while Shikha and Dawa won rupees 50,000 and 25,000 respectively.

Three of the five contestants—Jyoti Dogra, Shikha Sharma and Priyanka Dogra—were from Himachal Pradesh, while the other two—Dawa Dema and Kuenzang Chodon—were from Bhutan.

=== List of contestants ===
Name	Age	Education	Hometown
Dawa Dema	22		Thimphu, Bhutan
Jyoti Dogra	22		Bhagsu Nag, India
Kunezang Choden	23		Thimphu, Bhutan
Priyanka Dogra	24		Bilaspur, India
Shikha Sharma	20		Dharamshala, India

- Full 2014 contestant information

== Miss Himalaya 2013 ==
The Miss Himalaya Pageant 2013 was not conducted due to lack of funds.

== Miss Himalaya 2012 ==
Twenty-three-year-old Rinchen Dolma from Sikkim was crowned the Miss Himalaya 2012 at the Tibetan Institute of Performing Arts in McLeod Ganj on 13 October 2012. Dolma was determined the winner among five contestants by a panel of three judges. Thinley Yangchen from Spiti bagged the First Runner-up, and Rachna Dhiman was named as the Second Runner-up.

- https://www.misshimalaya.com/event/2012/10/rinchen-dolma-is-miss-himalaya-2012/ Full story on pageant website]

=== List of contestants ===
Name	Age	Education	Hometown
Kunga Tseten			Sikkim, India
Rachna Dhiman			Kangra, India
Rinchen Dolma			Sikkim, India
Thinley Yangchen			Spiti, India

- Full 2012 contestant information

== Awards ==
The winner gets one lakh Indian rupees: 100,000.00; the first runner-up rupees: 50,000.00; and the second runner-up rupees: 25,000.00.
