= Tejaswini Manogna =

Indian doctor, model and beauty pageant titleholder

Dr Tejaswini Manogna B
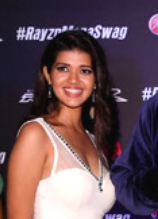
- Born: 19 May 1994 (age 32); Hyderabad, Telangana, India
- Education: MBBS, Osmania medical college, Hyderabad
- Occupations: Doctor; model
- Beauty pageant titleholder
- Hair color: Black
- Eye color: Brown
- Major competitions: Miss Diva - 2017 (Top 6); Miss Divine Beauty 2019 (Miss Earth India); Miss Earth 2019 (Unplaced)

Tejaswini Manogna (born 19 May 1994) is an Indian model and beauty pageant titleholder. A medical doctor by profession, she won the title of Divine Miss Earth India 2019 and represented India at the 19th edition of the Miss Earth pageant held at Parañaque City, in the Philippines.

== Early life and education ==
Tejaswini Manogna was born on 19 May 1994 in the city of Hyderabad of present-day Telangana, India. She did her schooling at the Rosary Convent High School and was a member of the National Cadet Corps, a youth wing of the Indian Armed Forces.

At the age of 16, she was adjudged as 'India's Best NCC Cadet' and 'Best Shooter' among 1.3 million cadets of the Indian Air Force, Army and Navy.

She was conferred with the Young Achiever award at the South Asian Association for Regional Cooperation meeting in Sri Lanka.

In 2017, she received a graduation degree in medicine (MBBS) from the Osmania Medical College.

Manogna is also trained in Bharatanatyam, a major form of Indian classical dance. She has national level accreditation as a graded professional dancer by Doordarshan, and India's Ministry of Culture.

She has given a series of concerts and workshops at Yorkshire, Feltham and Sheffield. She holds a diploma in yoga training and has worked as a yoga instructor in Hyderabad.

== Pageantry ==
In 2017, Manogna auditioned for the Miss Diva - 2017 pageant. She was then shortlisted as a contestant. She won the 'Miss Talented' and 'Dazzler Eterna Best Makeover' subtitles during the contest. On the finale, she made it to the top 6 as a finalist.

In 2019, she auditioned for the title of Femina Miss Telangana 2019, where she was selected as one of the top 3 state finalists but could not make up to the selection for Femina Miss India 2019 finalists. The same year, she joined Divine Miss India contest. The finale was held at Kingdom of Dreams, on 31 August 2019. She won the 'Beauty for a Cause' sub-title at the pageant for her Eco projects. Manogna eventually won the title of Miss Earth India 2019, earning the right to represent India at the Miss Earth 2019 pageant.

=== Miss Earth 2019 ===
Manogna represented India at Miss Earth 2019 where she won 'Miss Global Choice' and 'Eco Trivia' awards. She was adjudged as the winner in Talent Round of Water Group, for performing bharatanatyam in tribute to Mother Earth. She also came third in Best in Long Gown competition among her group. The final coronation event was hosted in Okada Manila, Parañaque City, Philippines on 26 October 2019.

Awards and achievements
| Preceded by Devika Vaid | Miss Earth India; 2019 | Succeeded by Tanvi Kharote |
