= Miss Earth India =

Indian national beauty pageant

- Formation: 2001
- Type: Beauty pageant
- Headquarters: New Delhi
- Location: India
- Members: Miss Earth
- Official language: English
- Key people: Deepak Agarwal (National Director)
- Website: www.divinebeautygroup.com

Miss Earth India or Miss India Earth is a title given to the Indian woman who represents India at Miss Earth, an annual, international beauty pageant promoting environmental awareness. The current national pageant which chooses the Indian representative for Miss Earth is Miss Divine Beauty of India.

== History ==
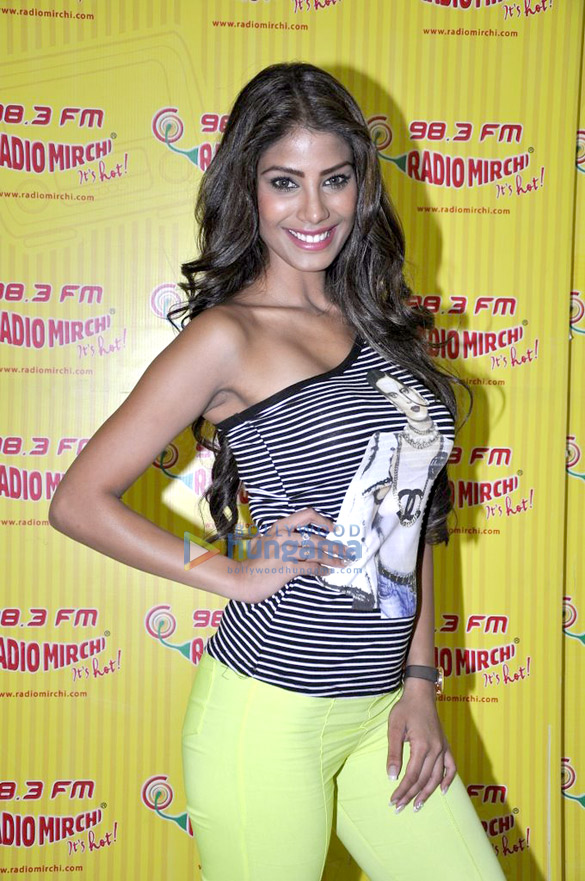
Miss Earth 2010 Nicole Faria promoting her Bollywood film Yaariyan

=== 2001–2014: Femina Miss India and Miss Diva ===
India has participated in the Miss Earth pageant since its inception in 2001. From 2001 to 2013, India's representatives at Miss Earth were selected by Femina Miss India (a beauty pageant founded in 1964). Femina Miss India is sponsored by Femina, a women's magazine published by the Times Group.

From 2002, the third winner of Femina Miss India was changed from Miss India Asia Pacific International to Femina Miss India-Earth to designate India's representative to the new Miss Earth pageant, and a finalist was sent to Miss International. From 2007 to 2009, three winners went to Miss Universe, Miss World, and Miss Earth. In 2010, I Am She - Miss Universe India acquired the rights to send India's representatives to the Miss Universe pageant. The first winner at Femina Miss India was designated to participate in Miss World, the second winner to Miss Earth, and the third winner to Miss International. In 2013, the Times Group regained the rights to send India's representatives to Miss Universe and launched a new pageant for Miss Universe (Miss Diva). The following year, Miss Earth India received the second title at the Miss Diva pageant.

India did well at the Miss Earth debut in 2001, when Shamita Singha was one of the Top 10 finalists. The country has become a strong contender for Miss Earth; Jyoti Brahmin of West Bengal and Shriya Kishore of Maharashtra made the Top 16 in 2004 and 2009, respectively (both years were won by Brazil). In 2006 and 2007, Amruta Patki and Pooja Chitgopekar were Miss Air (first runners-up).

In 2010, Nicole Faria won the Miss Earth crown for India. In addition to the main title, Faria was chosen as Miss Talent (the 10th pageant's first special award). She performed a belly dance combining Oriental and Middle Eastern styles in a performance which raised ₫100 million, which was donated to the Ho Chi Minh City Red Cross to aid flood victims in central Vietnam. As a Miss Earth winner, Faria addressed the problems of Bangalore's lakes. The lakes have rapidly disappeared in the past 30 years (from 270-300 lakes to about 80) due to industrial development. The remaining 80 lakes have been severely polluted by human and industrial waste.

In 2014, Femina Miss India's sister pageant (Miss Diva) sent India's representative to Miss Earth. The Miss Diva pageant, established in 2013, is also owned by the Times Group. The titleholder, Alankrita Sahai won on 14 October 2014.

=== 2015: Glamanand Supermodel India ===
Glamanand Supermodel India Beauty Pageant chairman Nikhil Anand acquired the rights to send India's delegates to the Miss Earth pageant in 2015, and the winner of the Glamanand Supermodel India 2015 contest was crowned Miss Earth India. In 2016, Glamanand lost the rights.

=== 2016: Cheryl Hansen ===
In 2016, the Miss Earth franchise of was obtained by Cheryl Hansen. The audition had 37 finalists from Bangalore and New Delhi screenings.

=== 2018: Glamanand Supermodel India ===
Glamanand Supermodel India sent India's representative to Miss Earth 2018, which was held in the Philippines.

=== 2019–present: Miss Divine Beauty ===
Miss Divine Beauty Pageant acquired the rights to send India's representatives to the Miss Earth pageant in 2019. Tejaswini Manogna, one of the contest winners, was crowned Miss Earth India 2019. Tanvi Kharote was crowned Miss Divine Beauty 2020 (held virtually).

Priyan Sain was crowned Miss Divine Beauty 2023, earning the right to represent India at Miss Earth 2023. She successfully placed in the Top 20, ending India's 12-year unplacement streak since Nicole Faria's historic win at Miss Earth 2010.

== Titleholders ==
Year	Titleholder	Title	Home	Venue
2026	Aarya Aawadhoot	Divine Miss Earth India 2026	Maharashtra	Jaipur
2025	Komal Choudhary	Divine Miss Earth India 2025	Maharashtra	Indradhanush Auditorium, Panchkula
2024	Gauri Gothankar	Divine Miss Earth India 2024	Maharashtra	Golden Tulip Suites, Gurgaon
2023	Priyan Sain	Divine Miss Earth India 2023	Rajasthan	Jawaharlal Nehru Auditorium, New Delhi
2022	Vanshika Parmar	Divine Miss Earth India 2022	Himachal Pradesh	Jawaharlal Nehru Auditorium, New Delhi
2021	Rashmi Madhuri	Divine Miss Earth India 2021	Karnataka	Welcom Hotel, New Delhi
2020	Tanvi Kharote	Divine Miss Earth India 2020	Maharashtra	Virtual Pageant
2019	Tejaswini Manogna	Divine Miss Earth India 2019	Telangana	Kingdom of Dreams, Gurgaon
2018	Devika Vaid	Glamanand Supermodel India 2018	New Delhi	Kingdom of Dreams, Gurgaon
2017	Shaan Suhas Kumar	Miss Earth India 2017	Madhya Pradesh	Kempinski Ambience Hotel, New Delhi
2016	Rashi Yadav	Miss Earth India 2016	New Delhi	Kempinski Ambience Hotel, New Delhi
2015	Aaital Khosla	Glamanand Supermodel India 2015	Chandigarh	Courtyard Marriott Hotel, Gurgaon

== Miss Earth representatives ==
Color key

- : Declared as winner
- : Ended as runner-up or top 5/6 qualification
- : Ended as one of the finalists/semi-finalists
- : Unplaced but given special award(s)

Year	Delegate	State	Placement & Performance	
Year	Delegate	State	Placements	Special award(s)
2001	Shamita Singha	Maharashtra	Top 10	3 Special Awards: Best in National Costume; Miss Avon; Miss Lux
2002	Reshmi Ghosh	West Bengal	Unplaced	
2003	Shweta Vijay	Kerala	Unplaced	
2004	Jyoti Brahmin	West Bengal	Top 16	
2005	Niharika Singh	Uttarakhand	Unplaced	
2006	Amruta Patki	Maharashtra	Miss Air (1st Runner-Up)	1 Special Award: Best in Long Gown
2007	Pooja Chitgopekar	Karnataka	Miss Air (1st Runner-Up)	
2008	Tanvi Vyas	Gujarat	Unplaced	
2009	Shriya Kishore	Maharashtra	Top 16	
2010	Nicole Faria	Karnataka	Miss Earth 2010	2 Special Awards: Miss Talent; Miss Diamond Place
2011	Hasleen Kaur	New Delhi	Unplaced	
2012	Prachi Mishra	Uttar Pradesh	Unplaced	12 Special Awards: (gold) – Miss Friendship; (gold) – Miss Congeniality; (gold) – Best in Swimsuit; (gold) – Best in Resort Wear; (gold) – Miss MyPhone; (gold) – Miss Advance Placenta; (gold) – I Love My Planet School Campaign; (silver) – Evening Gown Competition; (silver) – Miss Photogenic; (silver) – Press Presentation; (bronze) – Trivia Challenge; (bronze) – Resorts Wear competition (Group 3)
2013	Sobhita Dhulipala	Andhra Pradesh	Unplaced	5 Special Awards: (gold) – Miss Photogenic; (gold) – Miss Earth Eco Beauty; (gold) – Miss Ever Bilena; Top 15 – Miss Talent; Top 15 – Best in Resort Wear
2014	Alankrita Sahai	New Delhi	Unplaced	8 Special Awards: (gold) – Miss Earth Pagudpud; (gold) – Miss Hannah's Beach Resort Best in Casual Wear; (gold) – Best Evening Gown; (silver) – Miss Photogenic; (silver) – Besuty for a Cause; (bronze) – Best in Swimsuit; (bronze) – Best National Costume; Top 10 – Miss Eco - Beauty
2015	Aaital Khosla	Punjab	Unplaced	2 Special Awards: (gold) Cooking Challenge; (gold) Speech at United Nations
2016	Rashi Yadav	New Delhi	Unplaced	
2017	Shaan Suhas Kumar	Madhya Pradesh	Unplaced	2 Special Awards: (bronze) – Miss Friendship (group 3); Top 16 – Intelligence and Environmental Awareness
2018	Nishi Bhardwaj	New Delhi	Unplaced	1 Special Award: (bronze) – Resort wear (Air Group)
2019	Tejaswini Manogna	Telangana	Unplaced	3 Special Awards: Miss Global Choice; (gold) – Talent (Water Group); (bronze) – Long Gown (Water Group)
2020	Tanvi Kharote	Maharashtra	Unplaced	
2021	Rashmi Madhuri	Karnataka	Unplaced	
2022	Vanshika Parmar	Himachal Pradesh	Unplaced	
2023	Priyan Sain	Rajasthan	Top 20	
2024	Gauri Gothankar	Maharashtra	Unplaced	
2025	Komal Choudhary	Maharashtra	Top 25	
2026	Aarya Aawadhoot	Maharashtra	TBA	

== Gallery ==
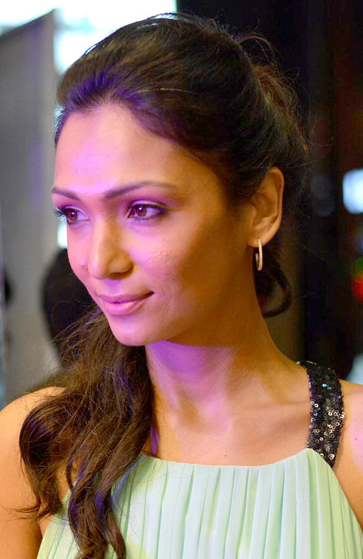
Shamita Singha, Miss India Earth 2001

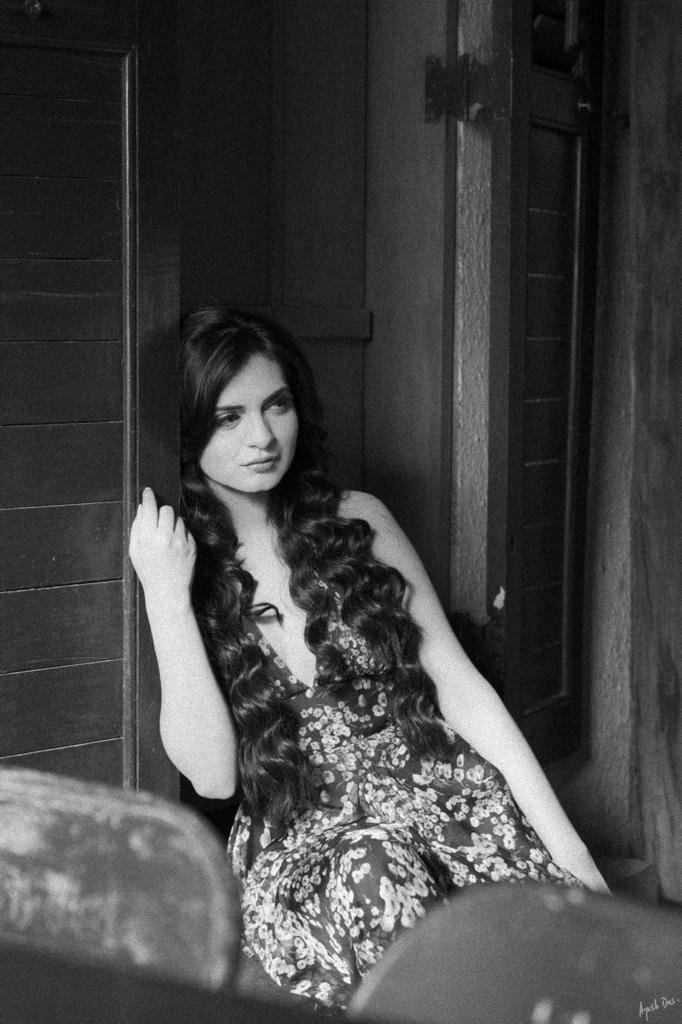
Niharika Singh, Miss India Earth 2005

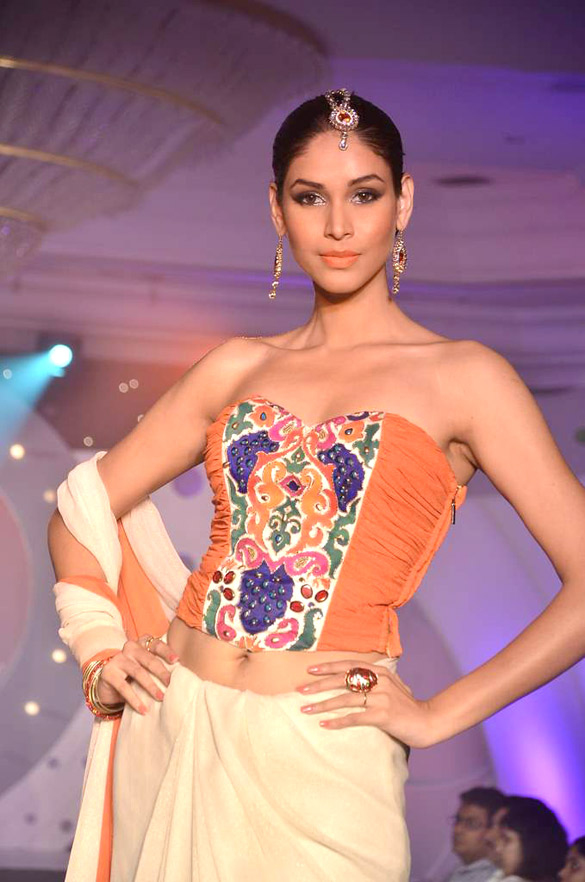
Amruta Patki, 1st Runner-up Miss Earth 2006

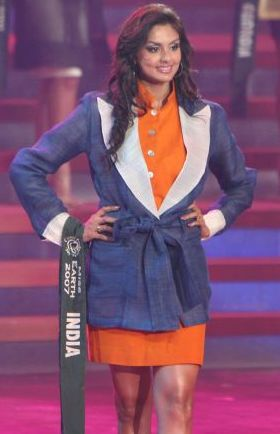
Pooja Chitgopekar, 1st Runner-up Miss Earth 2007

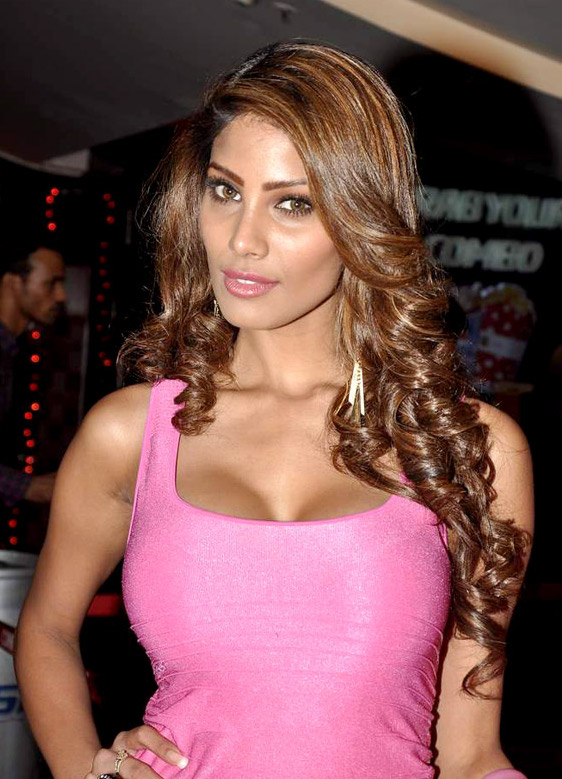
Nicole Faria, Miss Earth 2010

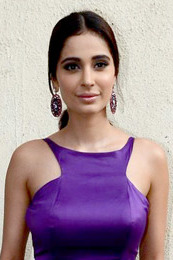
Alankrita Sahai, Miss India Earth 2014

== Notes ==
- 2018 - Devika Vaid was originally crowned Miss Earth India 2018 by the Glamanand Supermodel India Organization. However, due to an injury, Nishi Bhardwaj was sent to represent India at the Miss Earth 2018 pageant.
- 2017 - No national pageant was held in 2017. Shaan Suhas Kumar, the reigning Miss Earth India Air 2016, was appointed as Miss Earth India 2017 by the national director Cheryl Hansen.
