= Akbar Sami =

- Origin: India
- Occupations: Choreographer, dancer, DJ, musician

Akbar Sami is a dance choreographer turned DJ and musician. He is known as one of the pioneers of DJ music in India. He became famous with his remix albums such as Jalwa, Jalwa 2, and Jadoo.

== Career ==
Akbar Sami started his career as a team dancer with Bollywood celebrities such as Arshad Warsi, Sajid Khan and Longinus Fernandes at the age of 13. He also used to cut tapes for his dance shows. Later, he turned into a choreographer. He forayed into DeeJaying when a manager of a nightclub requested him to fill up the official DJ for that night. Then, he became the resident DJ at a club named Xanadu. After gaining some experience, he did a crash course in deejaying from London.

He is a self-taught disc jockey. He is one of the few DJ's who started their journey in the 1980s. In 2005, he began collaborating with Himesh Reshammiya to Remix most of his Tracks. He made his acting debut as a negative character called Ghoda Bhai in the film called Fattu Sala in 2015.

He has collaborated with DJ Aqeel, DJ Chetas and DJ Kiran Kamath to Remix the title track from Himesh Reshammiya's album, Aap Se Mausiiquii.

In 2018, he debuted as a singer in the remake of classic Bollywood song "Kabhi Kabhi".
