= Catharina Svensson =

Danish beauty pageant contestant and lawyer

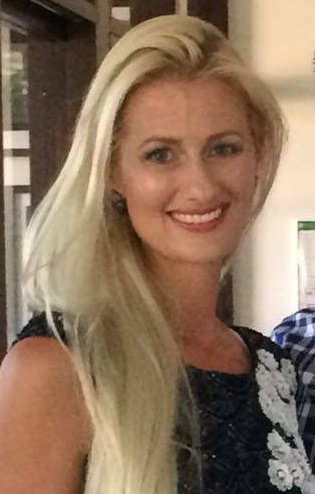
- Catharina in 2015
- Born: Catharina Svensson; 27 November 1979 (age 46); Copenhagen, Denmark
- Height: 1.80 m (5 ft 11 in)
- Beauty pageant titleholder
- Title: Miss Earth 2001
- Hair color: Blonde
- Eye color: Blue
- Major competitions: Miss Earth 2001 (Winner)

Catharina Brink (née Svensson; born November 27, 1979) is a Danish lawyer, equestrienne, model and beauty queen who won the first ever Miss Earth 2001.

== Early and personal life ==
Svensson was originally from Copenhagen, Denmark, and carries dual citizenship (Swedish and Danish) through her parents. After her Miss Earth reign, she continued her studies and eventually became a lawyer.

On 6 October 2007, Svensson married Jan Brink, an Olympian and seven-time Swedish dressage champion. She moved to Sweden with Brink after their wedding in Trollenäs Castle. The couple had met in 2005 and on New Year's Eve of 2006, Brink proposed to Svensson on a skiing holiday in Verbier, Switzerland. On March 22, 2010, Svensson gave birth to her first child, Angelina Brink.

== Pageantry ==
Svensson won the first Miss Earth, an annual international beauty pageant promoting environmental awareness, when she was crowned on 28 October 2001. At the time of her crowning, the 19-year-old Svensson was a third year law student and a part-time model. It was her first time to participate in any beauty contest; she was appointed by the national pageant director of Miss Earth Denmark. Svensson became the second youngest winner of Miss Earth when Drita Ziri won at age 18 in 2023.

In October 2005, she went back to the Philippines and served as one of the judges in the Miss Earth 2005, the fifth edition of the pageant won by Miss Venezuela, Alexandra Braun.

In 2015, she was guest of honor and official judge in the final of Miss Earth 2015 in Vienna, Austria. She advocated during the coronation night to stay focused on promoting environmental conservation.

In May 2016, she was a judge at the Face of Denmark competition together with former Miss Earth 2009, Larissa Ramos and crowned the new Miss Earth Denmark.

Awards and achievements
Preceded by New title	Miss Earth; 2001	Succeeded by (Bosnia and Herzegovina) Dzejla Glavovic (Dethroned) (Kenya) Winfred Omwakwe (Assumed)
