= Miss Earth India 2016 =

- Date: October 3, 2016
- Theme: Beauty & Brain - Cause & Care
- Venue: Ramada Gurgaon Central, Delhi, India
- Broadcaster: Colors (TV channel), Zoom (TV channel)
- Entrants: 21
- Placements: 4
- Winner: Rashi Rao

The second running of the Miss Earth India beauty pageant as an independent pageant was held in September 2016... It sought to support the causes of Beti Bachao Beti Padhao and Green India. The winner represented India at the Miss Earth 2016 competition.

== Results ==
=== Placements ===
Placement	Contestant
Miss Earth India 2016	Rashi Rao
Miss Earth India Air 2016	Shaan Suhas Kumar
Miss Earth India Water 2016	Chum Darang
Miss Earth India Fire 2016	Hemal Ingle

== Finalists ==
Contestant	Age	City
Aastha Abhay		Jharkhand
Adya Shrivastava		Madhya Pradesh
Akansha Mohan		Maharashtra
Apurva Kumarley		Gujarat
Bhavyata Sharma		Rajasthan
Chum Darang		Arunachal Pradesh
Divyanshi Jain		Uttar Pradesh
Hema D Ingale		Maharashtra
Isha Chhabara		Maharashtra
Kirti H Pingale		Maharashtra
Nandini Singhwal		Uttarakhand
Nikeeta Bellgard		New Delhi
Pallavi Sirohi		Maharashtra
Pooja Katyal		New Delhi
Rashi Rao		New Delhi
Rituparna Gosh		West Bengal
Sakshi Gupta		Uttar Pradesh
Shaan Suhas Kumar		Madhya Pradesh
Shwetha Gadad		Karnataka
Samya Singh		Uttar Pradesh
Somya Sexana		Maharashtra
Sonali Verma		Uttarakhand
Tanvi Dixit		Maharashtra
Upasana Singh		Maharashtra

== Crossovers ==
- Bhavyata Sharma
  - Ru-Ba-Ru Miss India Elite 2014 - (Winner)
  - Supermodel International 2014 - (Semifinalist)
  - Campus Princess 2014 - (Finalist)
- Rashi Yadav
  - Miss Diva - 2015
