= Miss Earth 2001 =

1st Miss Earth pageant

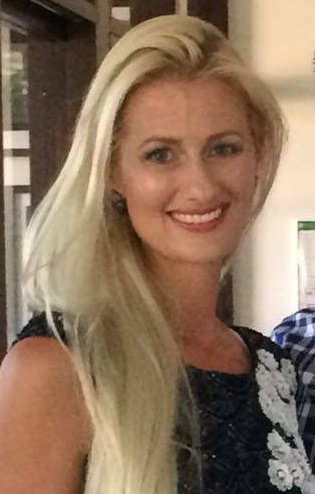
- Catharina Svensson
- Date: October 28, 2001
- Presenters: Emma Suwannarat; Jaime Garchitorena; Asha Gill
- Venue: University of the Philippines Theater, Quezon City, Metro Manila, Philippines
- Broadcaster: RPN; GMA Network; The Filipino Channel; Star World
- Entrants: 42
- Placements: 10
- Debuts: Argentina; Australia; Bolivia; Brazil; Canada; Colombia; Croatia; Denmark; Dominican Republic; El Salvador; Estonia; Ethiopia; Finland; Gibraltar; Guatemala; Hungary; India; Italy; Japan; Kazakhstan; Kenya; Latvia; Lebanon; Malaysia; Netherlands; New Zealand; Nicaragua; Panama; Peru; Philippines; Puerto Rico; Russia; Singapore; South Africa; Spain; Taiwan; Tanzania; Thailand; Turkey; United States; Venezuela; Zanzibar
- Winner: Catharina Svensson; Denmark
- Congeniality: Misuzu Hirayama, Japan
- Best National Costume: Shamita Singha, India
- Photogenic: Daniela Stucan, Argentina

Miss Earth 2001 was the first edition of the Miss Earth pageant, held at the University of the Philippines Theater in Quezon City, Metro Manila, Philippines, on October 28, 2001.

At the end of the event, Catharina Svensson of Denmark was crowned as Miss Earth 2001.

Contestants from forty-two countries and territories participated in this year's pageant. The pageant was hosted by Emma Suwannarat, Jaime Garchitorena, and Asha Gill.

== Background ==
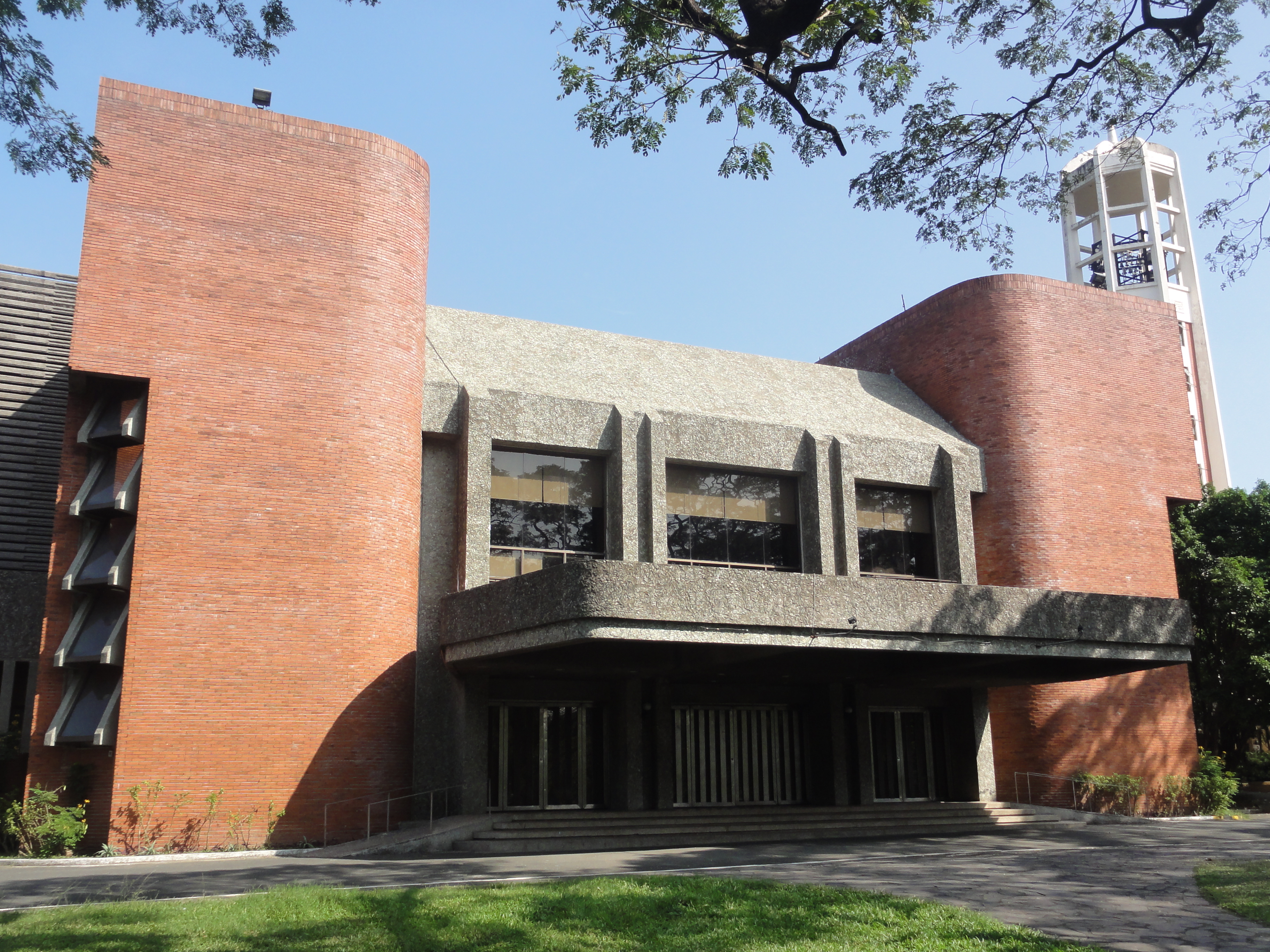
University of the Philippines Theater, the venue

=== Location and date ===
After the contract of Carousel Productions to stage the Mutya ng Pilipinas and Miss Asia Pacific International pageants was not renewed in the year 2000, the production company, led by Ramon Monzon and Lorraine Schuck, has decided to come up with their own pageants, with the help of former beauty queens from Mutya ng Pilipinas. These pageants are eventually named as Miss Philippines (which eventually became Miss Philippines Earth), and Miss Earth, which focuses on environmental consciousness.

Miss Earth was formally launched in a press conference on April 3, 2001, along with the search of Miss Philippines to represent Philippines in the international competition. Likewise, the pageant tied up with the Philippine government agencies such as the Philippine Department of Tourism (DoT), Department of Environment and Natural Resources (DENR), the Metropolitan Manila Development Authority (MMDA), and at least two international environmental groups such as the United Nations Environment Programme (UNEP) and the American Global Release to further its environmental advocacy.

=== Selection of participants ===
Contestants from forty-two countries and territories were selected to compete in the pageant. There were originally sixty countries that will compete in this edition, but was trimmed down to fifty-two after the September 11 attacks that happened in New York and Washington, United States. The number of contestants was further whittled to forty-two following the air-strikes on Afghanistan by the coalition led by the United States. Some countries who withdrew due to the aforementioned events include Costa Rica, France, Germany, Hong Kong, Malawi, Nepal, Switzerland, Uruguay, and Vietnam.

== Results ==
=== Placements ===
Placement	Contestant
Miss Earth 2001	Denmark – Catharina Svensson
Miss Earth – Air 2001	Brazil – Simone Régis
Miss Earth – Water 2001	Kazakhstan – Margarita Kravtsova
Miss Earth – Fire 2001	Argentina – Daniela Stucan
Top 10	Bolivia – Catherine Villarroel; Estonia – Evelyn Mikomägi; India – Shamita Singha; Latvia – Jelena Keirane; Philippines – Carlene Aguilar; United States – Abigail Royce

=== Special awards ===
==== Major awards ====
Awards	Contestant
Miss Friendship	Japan – Misuzu Hirayama
Miss Photogenic	Argentina – Daniela Stucan
Miss Talent	Latvia – Jelena Keirane
Best in National Costume	India – Shamita Singha
Best in Evening Gown	Philippines – Carlene Aguilar
Best in Swimsuit	Kazakhstan – Margarita Kravtsova

==== Minor/Sponsor awards ====
Awards	Contestant
Miss Avon	India – Shamita Singha
Miss Close-up	Philippines – Carlene Aguilar
Miss Creamsilk	Argentina – Daniela Stucan
Miss Lux	India – Shamita Singha
Miss Ponds	Estonia – Evelyn Mikomägi

== Contestants ==
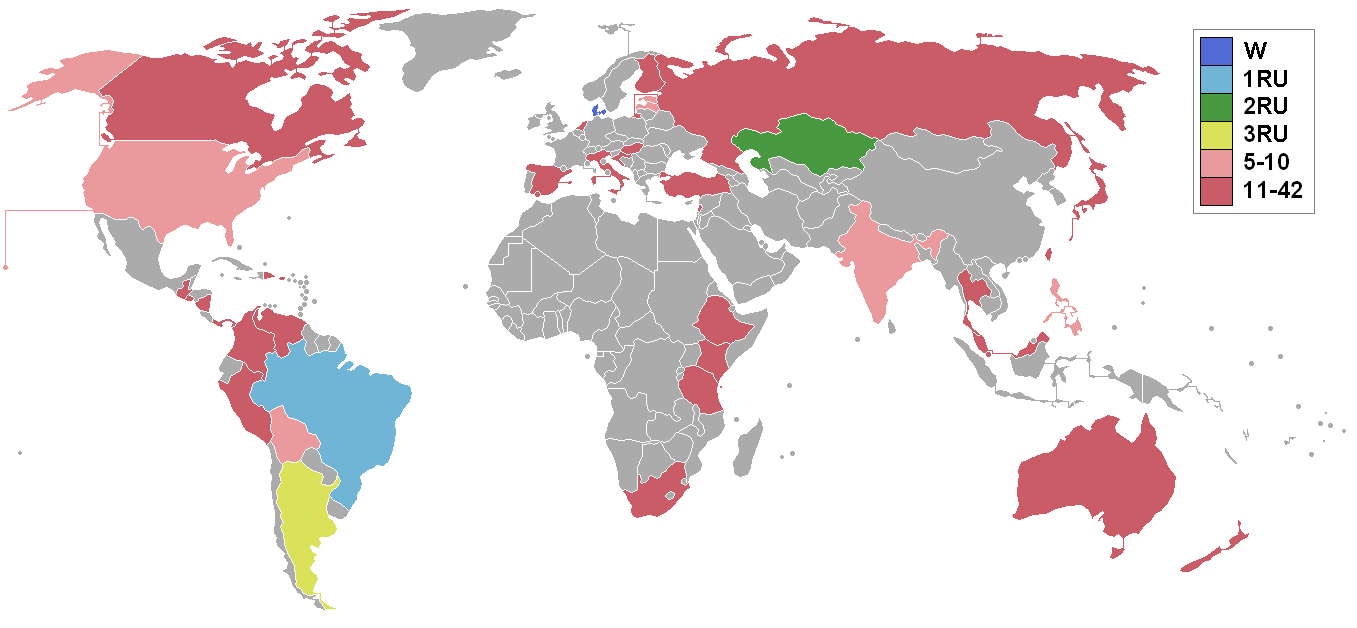
Countries and territories which sent delegates and results

Forty-two contestants competed for the title.

Country/Territory	Contestant	Age (Note: Ages at the time of the pageant)	Hometown
Argentina	Daniela Stucan	22	Ensenada
Australia	Christy Anderson	–	Sydney
Bolivia	Catherine Villarroel	19	Santa Cruz de la Sierra
Brazil	Simone Régis	22	Santa Catarina
Canada	Michelle Weswaldi	24	Woodbridge
Colombia	Natalia Botero	21	Cesar
Croatia	Ivana Galesic	–	Zagreb
Denmark	Catharina Svensson	19	Copenhagen
Dominican Republic	Catherine Núñez	–	Elías Piña
El Salvador	Grace Marie Zabaneh	22	San Salvador
Estonia	Evelyn Mikomägi	21	Tallinn
Ethiopia	Nardos Tiluhan Wondemu	21	Addis Ababa
Finland	Martina Aitolehti	19	Helsinki
Gibraltar	Charlene Ann Figueras	21	Gibraltar
Guatemala	Carmina Elizabeth Paz	–	Guatemala City
Hungary	Krisztina Kovacs	–	Budapest
India	Shamita Singha	22	Mumbai
Italy	Monica Rosetti	19	Milan
Japan	Misuzu Hirayama	–	Tokyo
Kazakhstan	Margarita Kravtsova	20	Astana
Kenya	Aqua Bonsu	–	Nairobi
Latvia	Jelena Keirane	21	Riga
Lebanon	Adelle Raymond Boustany	–	Beirut
Malaysia	Joey Tan	24	Penang
Netherlands	Jamie-Lee Huisman	–	North Holland
New Zealand	Abbey Flynn	–	Auckland
Nicaragua	Karla José Leclair	–	Matagalpa
Panama	Aliana Khan	–	Panama City
Peru	Paola Barreda	–	Lima
Philippines	Carlene Aguilar	19	Quezon City
Puerto Rico	Amaricelys Reyes	–	Isabela
Russia	Victoria Bonya	–	Krasnokamensk
Singapore	Calista Ng	23	Singapore
South Africa	Inecke van der Westhuizen	–	Gauteng
Spain	Noemi Caldas	–	Madrid
Taiwan	Hsiu Chao-Yun	–	Taipei
Tanzania	Hilda Bukozo	–	Dar es Salaam
Thailand	Victoria Wachholz	–	Chiang Mai
Turkey	Gozde Bahadir	–	Istanbul
United States	Abigail Royce	25	San Diego
Venezuela	Lirigmel Ramos	18	Caracas
Zanzibar	Sheena Nanty	–	Zanzibar City

== Other Notes ==
- Estonia – Evelyn Mikomägi also competed in the 2000 pageant in Cyprus, where she achieved a Top 10 placement. She made history by being the first and only representative from Estonia to reach this milestone in Miss Earth.
- Kazakhstan – Margarita Kravtsova also competed in the 2000 pageant in London, where she achieved a Top 10 placement. She made history by being the first representative from Kazakhstan to reach this milestone in Miss Earth.
