= Femina Miss India Delhi =

Beauty pageant

- Formation: 2013
- Founder: Femina Miss India Organization
- Founded at: New Delhi
- Type: Beauty pageant
- Headquarters: Mumbai
- Location: India
- Members: Femina Miss India (2013–present)
- Official language: Hindi, English
- Owner: Vineet Jain
- Parent organisation: Femina Miss India Organization
- Affiliations: The Times Group
- Website: www.missindiadelhi.com

Femina Miss India Delhi is a beauty pageant in India whose winners compete nationally in the Femina Miss India pageant. The reigning Femina Miss India Delhi is Sifti Singh. She represented Delhi at Femina Miss India 2024.

== Titleholders ==
Year	Femina Miss India Delhi
2024	Sifti Singh
2023	Shreya Poonja
2022	Prakshi Goyal
2020	Supriya Dahiya
2019	Mansi Sehgal
2018	Gayatri Bharadwaj
2017	Maira Chowdhury
2016	Priyadarshini Chatterjee
2015	Apeksha Porwal
2014	Koyal Rana
2013	Anukriti Gusain

== Runners up ==
After 2016, runner up status was not awarded. The top three finalists are short listed during the Delhi audition, and they compete for the Femina Miss India Delhi title at North Zonals, since 2017. The winner represents the National Capital Region, Delhi at the Femina Miss India finals.

Year	1st runner up	2nd runner up
2016	Natasha Singh	Rinki Ghildiyal
2015	Aditi Arya	Rushali Rai
2014	Shashi Bangari	Malti Chahar
2013	Vijaya Sharma	Srishti Rana

== Representatives at International Pageants ==
The following is a list of Miss Delhi Winners at International Beauty Pageants (Since 2013) by Femina Miss India/Miss Diva Organization:

Year	Delegate	State	International Pageant	Placement & Performance	
Year	Delegate	State	International Pageant	Placements	Special award(s)
2013	Srishti Rana	Haryana	Miss Asia Pacific World 2013	Winner	3 Special Awards: Best National Costume; Miss Personality; Miss Talent
2013	Vijaya Sharma	New Delhi	Miss Supranational 2013	Top 20	
2014	Koyal Rana	New Delhi	Miss World 2014	Top 11	9 Special Awards: Miss World - Asia; Winner – Beauty With a Purpose; Winner – World Fashion Designer Dress; Dances of the World Performer; Top 5 – Miss World Beach Beauty; Top 5 – Multimedia Award; Top 10 – The People's Choice; Top 20 – Miss World Top Model; Top 32 – Miss World Sport
2014	Anukriti Gusain	Uttarakhand	Miss Asia Pacific World 2014	4th Runner-up	
2015	Aditi Arya	New Delhi	Miss World 2015	Unplaced	6 Special Awards: Top 5 – Multimedia Award; Top 5 – People's Choice Award; Top 10 – World Fashion Designer Dress; Top 25 – Beauty with a Purpose; Top 30 – Miss World Talent; Top 30 – Miss World Top Model
2016	Priyadarshini Chatterjee	Assam	Miss World 2016	Top 20	2 Special Awards: Top 5 – Beauty with a Purpose; Top 21 – Miss World Talent
2018	Gayatri Bhardwaj	New Delhi	Miss United Continents 2018	Top 10	1 Special Award: 1st Runner-up – Best National Costume

== Performance at Femina Miss India ==
Color keys

- Declared winner
- Ended as runner-up
- Ended as finalist or semifinalist
- Unplaced

Year	Delegate	Hometown	Placement at Femina Miss India	Special awards at Femina Miss India
2024	Sifti Singh	New Delhi	Top 7	Miss India North; Miss Lifestyle; Miss Talent-Top 5 Miss Beautiful Eyes-Top 5
2023	Shreya Poonja	New Delhi	1st runner up	Miss Body Beautiful
2022	Prakshi Goyal	New Delhi	Unplaced	
2020	Supriya Dahiya	Gurgaon	Top 15	
2019	Mansi Sehgal	New Delhi	Unplaced	
2018	Gayatri Bharadwaj	New Delhi	Top 5	Miss Glamorous Look Miss Popular Miss Spectacular Eyes
2017	Maira Chowdhury	New Delhi	Top 15	
2016	Priyadarshini Chatterjee	Guwahati	Femina Miss India World 2016	Miss Rampwalk
2015	Apeksha Porwal	Mumbai	Unplaced	Miss Selfie
2014	Koyal Rana	New Delhi	Femina Miss India World 2014	Beauty with a Purpose Miss Healthy Skin
2013	Anukriti Gusain	Lansdowne	Top 5	Miss Photogenic Miss Beautiful Smile

== Femina Miss India Delhi 1st runner up ==
Year	Delegate	Hometown	Placement at Femina Miss India	Special awards at Femina Miss India
2016	Natasha Singh Chauhan	Bilaspur	Top 10	
2015	Aditi Arya	New Delhi	Femina Miss India World 2015	Miss Beautiful Hair Miss Sudoku
2014	Shashi Bhangari	New Delhi	Did not compete	
2013	Vijaya Sharma	New Delhi	Top 10	

== Femina Miss India Delhi 2nd runner up ==
Year	Delegate	Hometown	Placement at Femina Miss India	Special awards at Femina Miss India
2016	Rinki Ghildiyal	Dehradun	Did not compete	
2015	Rushali Rai	New Delhi	Top 10	
2014	Malti Chahar	Agra	Unplaced	Miss Sudoku
2013	Srishti Rana	Faridabad	Top 5	Miss Fashion Icon

== Delegates' notes ==
- Anukriti Gusain, Femina Miss India Delhi 2013, later represented India at Miss Asia Pacific World 2014 (May edition) and was crowned 4th runner up. She participated in Femina Miss India 2017 and won Miss Grand India 2017 title. She represented India in Miss Grand International 2017 and was one of the top 20 semifinalists.
- Vijaya Sharma, Femina Miss India Delhi 2013 1st runner up and Femina Miss India Supranational 2013, also won Elite Model Look India 2014.
- Srishti Rana, Femina Miss India Delhi 2013 2nd runner up, also competed in the Miss Diva 2013 pageant and was crowned Miss Diva Asia Pacific World 2013. That same year, she represented India at Miss Asia Pacific World 2013 and was crowned the winner. She was the second Indian and Asian woman to win the crown.
- Koyal Rana, Femina Miss India Delhi 2014, was Scooty Miss Teen Diva 2008, Miss Teen India 2008 and Fact Miss Universal Teen 2009.
- Apeksha Porwal, Femina Miss India Delhi 2015, was Scooty Miss Teen Diva 2009. She later participated in Miss Diva - 2017 and was second runner up.
- Prakshi Goyal, Femina Miss India Delhi 2022, later competed in Miss Universe India 2024 and made into the top 20.

== Photographs of some notable winners ==
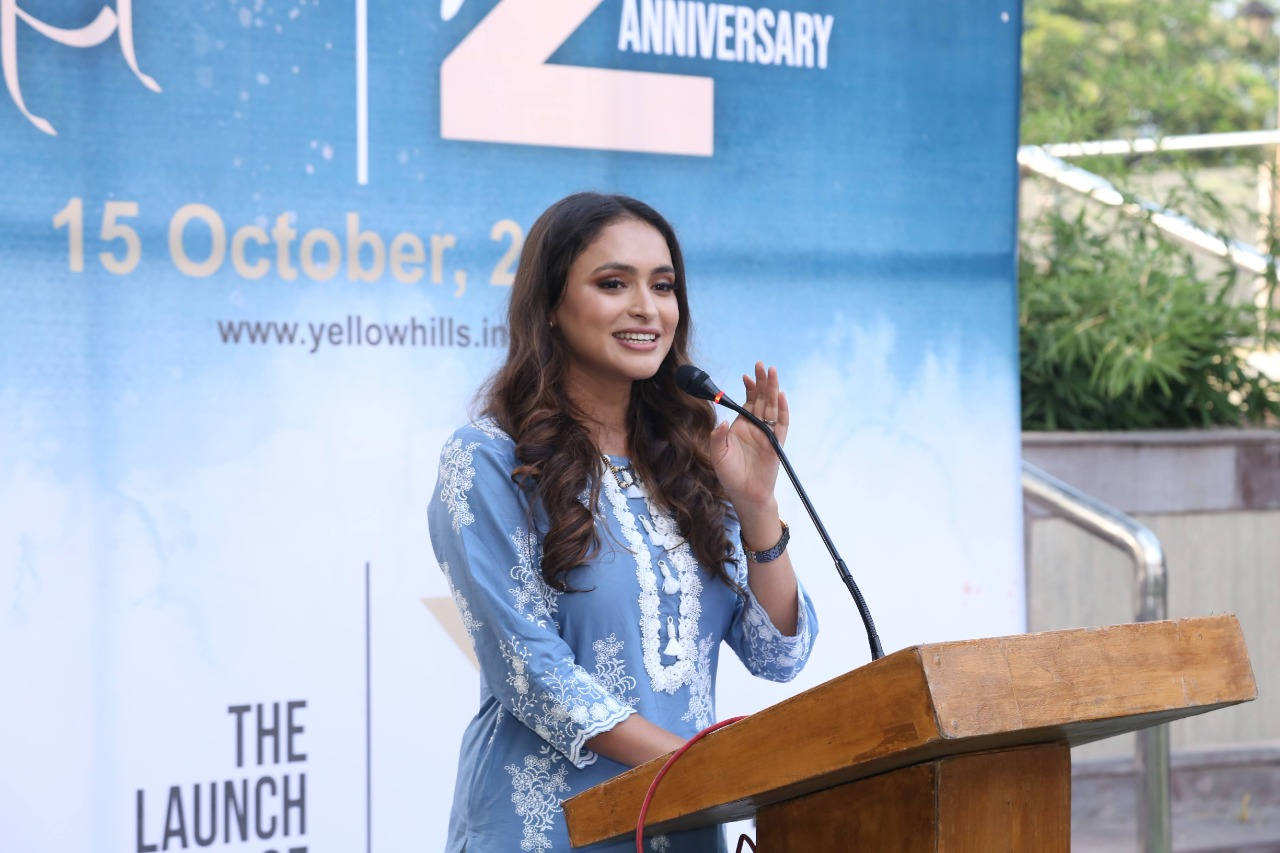
Anukriti Gusain
Femina Miss India Delhi 2013, Miss Asia Pacific World 2014 - 4th runner up and Miss Grand India 2017

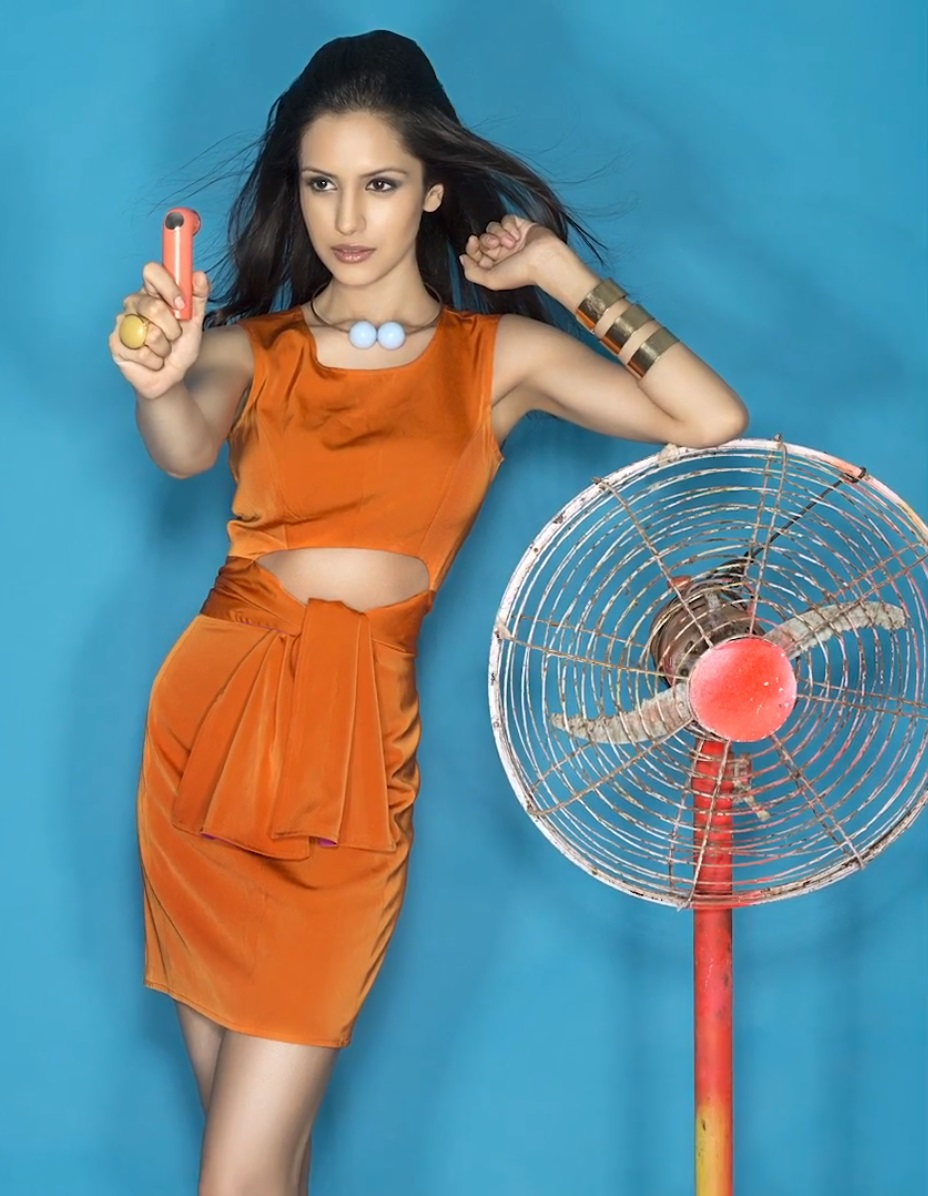
Koyal Rana
Femina Miss India 2014 and Miss World 2014-Asia

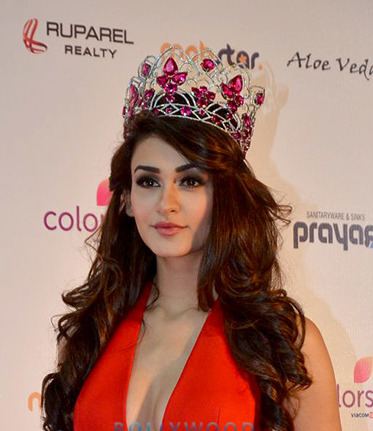
Aditi Arya
Femina Miss India 2015

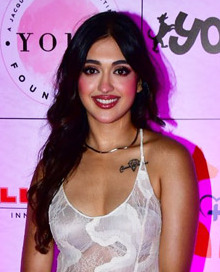
Gayatri Bhardwaj
Femina Miss India United Continents 2018
