= Femina Miss India Bangalore =

Indian beauty pageant

Femina Miss India Bangalore is a zonal beauty pageant in India. Winners compete in the Femina Miss India national pageant. Initially, it was started as a South Zonal competition, in which contestants from all South Indian States participated. In 2017, it was changed to Femina Miss India Karnataka. This event is part of a new format that is a state-wide competition introduced as Femina Miss India 2017. The winner from this pageant represents the state of Karnataka at the National level Femina Miss India contest.

== List of winners of Femina Miss India Bangalore ==
The following are winners of Femina Miss India Bangalore who represented the Bangalore city at Femina Miss India competition:

Color key

- Declared as Winner in Miss India
- Ended as Runner-up
- Ended as one of the Finalists or Semi-Finalists

Year	Winner	Represented	Placement at Femina Miss India /Miss Diva	International Ranking
2016	Roshmitha Harimurthy	Karnataka	Femina Miss India 2016 (Top 5 Finalist); Miss Diva - 2016 (Miss Universe India 2016)	Miss Universe 2016 (unplaced)
2013	Sobhita Dhulipala	Andhra Pradesh	Miss India Earth 2013	Miss Earth 2013 Miss Photogenic Miss Eco Beauty Miss Ever Bilena Miss Talent - Top 15 Best in Resort Wear - Top 15 (Unplaced)

== List of Winners of Femina Miss India Karnataka ==
The following are the winners of Femina Miss India Karnataka who represented the state of Karnataka at Femina Miss India competition:

Color key

- Declared as Winner in Miss India
- Ended as Runner-up Or Finalists.
- Ended as one of the Semi-finalists

Year	Winner	Home Town	Placement at Femina Miss India	Special Awards
2022	Sini Shetty	Mumbai	Winner	
2020	Rati Hulji	Mumbai	Top 5	
2019	Aashna Bisht	Delhi	Unplaced	Miss Beautiful Smile
2018	Bhavana Durgam	Bangalore	Top 12	
2017	Swathi Muppala	Bangalore	Top 15	

== By number of wins ==
State	Titles	Winning years
Andhra Pradesh	1	2013
Karnataka	1	2016
Kerala		
Tamil Nadu		
Telangana		

== International pageants ==
Year	Representative	International Pageant	International Ranking
2016	Roshmitha Harimurthy	Miss Universe	Unplaced
2013	Sobhita Dhulipala	Miss Earth	Unplaced

== Notes ==
- Femina Miss India Bangalore was introduced in 2013.
- The first-ever crowned Miss India Bangalore 2013, Shobitha Dhulipala, was crowned as the first runner-up of this contest.
