= Rewati Chetri =

Indian model, beauty queen (born 1993)

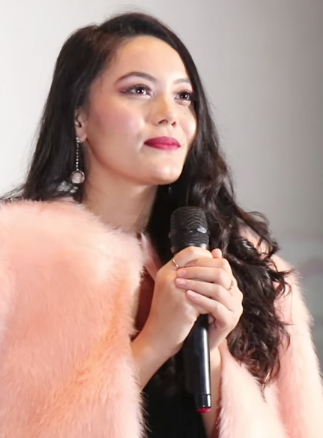
- Born: 4 July 1993 (age 33); Haflong, Assam, India
- Education: Gauhati University
- Occupations: Model; actress
- Height: 181 cm (5 ft 11 in)
- Beauty pageant titleholder
- Title: Miss International India 2016; Miss Asia - World Miss University 2016
- Major competitions: Femina Miss India 2015; (Top 10); World Miss University 2016; (Top 6); (Miss Asia); Miss International India 2016; (Winner); Miss International 2016; (Unplaced)

Rewati Chetri (born 4 July 1993) is an Indian actress, model and beauty pageant titleholder. She participated in Femina Miss India 2015 where she was a finalist. She was crowned Miss Asia at the World Miss University 2016 pageant, held in Beijing. In 2016 she participated in the Senorita India pageant, and won the title of Miss International India 2016. She represented India at Miss International 2016 held in Tokyo, Japan.

== Early life ==
She was born to Baburam Chetri, an ASEB employee and Mrs. Bina Chetri, a homemaker at Haflong, the lone hill station of the state to a family in Dima Hasao district of Assam. She graduated from Lumding College, Lumding, and is now studying for a LL.B. at NEF Law College, which is affiliated to Gauhati University in Guwahati.

== Acting career ==
In 2016, Chetri debuted as an actor in a music video produced by Dream House Production, for the Suresh Shama album Tumi Mur, with music was composed by "Bulbul and Rosty" and songs directed by Deepak Dey.

She made her television debut in 2017 with an episodic of Pyaar Tune Kya Kiya on Zing.

== Social works ==
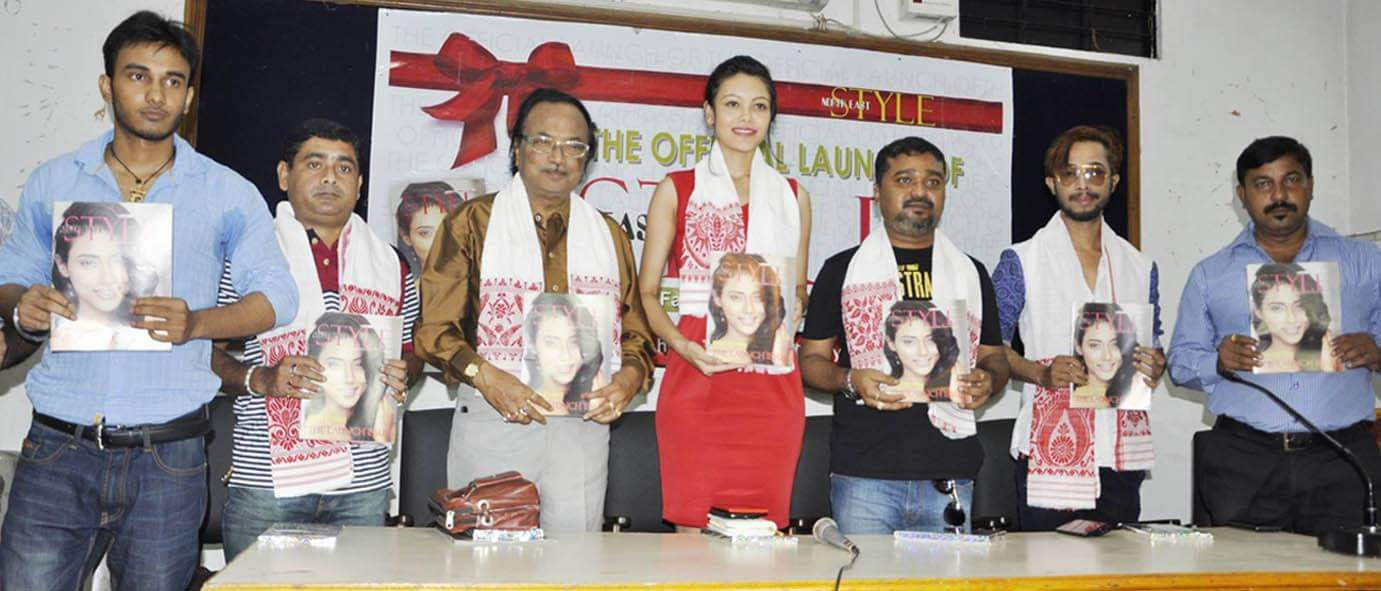
Rewati Chetri at Style Northeast launch

Chetri took part in a candlelight march with more than 200 people including many celebrities in May 2016 demanding justice to a brutally assaulted rape victim who was found dead near the Dihing river in Guwahati, Assam. This incident left entire state of Assam in shock and was compared to the Nirbhaya's incident of New Delhi. Rewati even pledged to support the victim's family.

== Pageantry ==
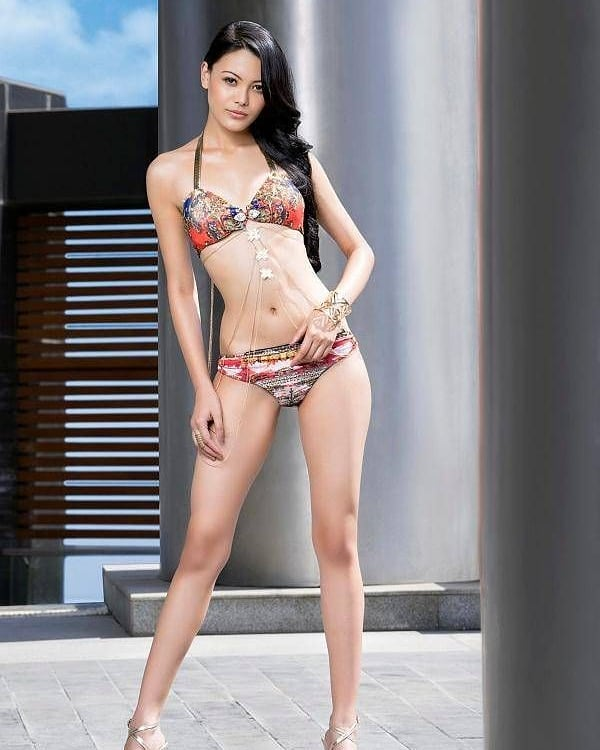
Rewati Chetri at a photoshoot

Chetri participated in the first edition of Senorita India and she won the title of Miss International India. She represented India at Miss International 2016 pageant She won the title of Miss Asia (Best in Asia Continent) at the World Miss University pageant in 2016 held Beijing, China. Chetri was selected as a finalist in Miss Earth India 2016 and she withdrew herself from the competition due to her modeling contracts.

=== Femina Miss India 2015 ===
Chetri made it to the Top - 5 as a Finalist of Miss India Kolkata, East India Audition of Miss India and qualified for Miss Femina Miss India 2015 Top 21 Finalist. She was a Top 10 Finalist in Femina Miss India 2015, but couldn't advance further in competition. She also won the subtitles "Miss Popular" and "Miss Multimedia" in the same pageant.

=== Miss International 2016 ===
She represented India at the 56th edition of Miss International pageant, which was held in Tokyo, Japan in October 2016.

== Filmography ==
=== Films ===
Key
†	Denotes films that have not yet been released

Year	Title	Role	Language	Remarks
2017	Gangs of North East	Margaret	Hindi	
2018	Khatoon		Hindi	
2019	Summer Love	Saya	Nepali	

=== Television ===
Year	Title	Role	Ref.
2017	Pyaar Tune Kya Kiya		
2025	Zyada Mat Udd	Liza Wangsu	

=== Web series ===
Year	Title	Role	Notes	Ref.
2024	Naam Namak Nishan	Ipupu Bhutia		

== See also ==
- Priyadarshini Chatterjee - Miss World India 2016.
- Roshmitha Harimurthy - Miss Universe India 2016.
- Brahmaputra Valley Film Festival

Awards and achievements
Preceded by Irshika Merhotra	Femina Miss Multimedia; 2015	Succeeded by Dnyanda Shringarpure
Preceded by (Philippines) Olga Gore	World Miss University - Miss Asia; 2015	Incumbent
Preceded by Ayeesha Aiman	Miss International India; 2016	Succeeded by Ankita Kumari
