= Femina Miss India 2017 =

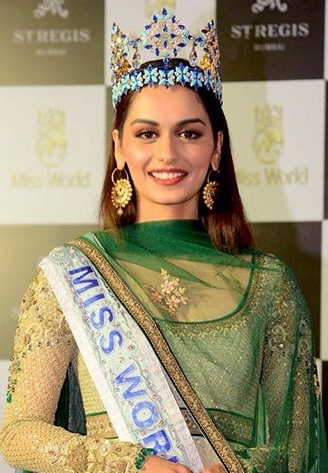
- Manushi Chhillar
- Date: 25 June 2017
- Presenters: Karan Johar; Riteish Deshmukh
- Venue: Yash Raj Film Studio
- Entrants: 30
- Placements: 15
- Winner: Manushi Chhillar; Haryana
- Congeniality: Rinky Chakma, Tripura
- Photogenic: Manushi Chhillar, Haryana

Femina Miss India 2017 was the 54th edition of the Femina Miss India beauty pageant held on 25 June 2017 at Yash Raj Films, Mumbai. Priyadarshini Chatterjee of Delhi crowned Manushi Chhillar of Haryana as her successor. Sana Dua of Jammu and Kashmir was crowned first runner up and Priyanka Kumari of Bihar was crowned second runner Up.

As Femina Miss India 2017, Manushi Chhillar represented India at Miss World 2017 where she was crowned Miss World 2017. After the Femina Miss India 2017 pageant, Sana Dua, first runner Up 2017, was announced as India's representative to Miss United Continents 2017 that was held in September 2017 in Ecuador, where she reached the top 10. Priyanka Kumari, Femina Miss India second runner up 2017, was announced as India's representative to Miss Intercontinental 2017 which was held on 25 January 2018 in Egypt, where she won the best national costume subtitle award. Anukriti Gusain, Femina Miss India Uttrakhand 2017, was announced as India's representative to Miss Grand International 2017 that was held on 25 October 2017 in Vietnam, where she placed in the top 20.

== New Format ==
This year saw a change in the format of the fbb Colors Femina Miss India contest, with the competition travelling to all 30 states of the country to hunt for the best talent from each state. The winners were mentored by four celebrities -

- Neha Dhupia (North Zone)
- Parvathy Omanakuttan (South Zone)
- Dipannita Sharma (East Zone)
- Waluscha de Sousa (West Zone)

The state winners further participated in the grand finale of fbb Colors Femina Miss India 2017. The process started with auditioning Miss India aspirants from each state, where three girls from every state were selected to go forward to the zonal stage. The zonal events were held in Delhi (North Zone), Bengaluru (South Zone), Kolkata (East Zone) and Pune (West Zone). Each zonal event had the three state finalists from the respective states under that zone competing for the state crown. The Femina Miss India Organisation had removed the bikini round for audition. So, there was no swimsuit competition from this event onwards.

The organisation also brought down the height criteria to 5.5" and above.

== Initiatives and Contributions ==
Manushi Chillar, living by her mantra, 'Beauty with a purpose', initiated various projects for her nation which primarily revolved around menstrual hygiene, helping people to focus on the "Freedom From Shame" of menstruation.

In February 2018, Manushi was seen guiding people on menstrual education and training them on how to create low-cost biodegradable sanitary pads from jute. She was seen carrying forward this activity all over Kolkata as a part of "Project Shakti".

Manushi Chillar also led a tour with her campaign that focused on "Feminine Hygiene Awareness", contributing to five different cities, including Hyderabad, New Delhi and Kolkata. She majorly focused the rural areas and people living with low accessible benefits, teaching them everything about female hygiene and proper care to be taken.

== Results ==
Color keys

For regional group:	For international placement:
E East Zone	The contestant won
N North Zone	The contestant was a runner-up
S South Zone	The contestant was a semi-finalist
W West Zone	Unplaced

Final Results	Candidate	International Placement
Femina Miss India 2017	N Haryana - Manushi Chhillar	Miss World 2017
Miss India United Continents 2017	N Jammu & Kashmir - Sana Dua	Top 10
Miss India Intercontinental 2017	E Bihar - Priyanka Kumari	Unplaced
Miss India Grand International 2017	N Uttarakhand - Anukriti Gusain	Top 20
Top 6	W Maharashtra - Aishwarya Devan; N Uttar Pradesh - Shefali Sood	
Top 15	E Arunachal Pradesh - Licha Thosum; E Assam - Triveni Burman; N Delhi - Maira Choudhary; W Goa - Audrey D'Silva; S Karnataka - Swati Muppala; S Kerala - Mannat Singh; E Mizoram - Rody H Vanlalhriatpuii; W Rajasthan - Aditi Hundia; N Punjab - Navpreet Kaur	

=== Sub Title Awards ===
Award	Contestant
Miss Multimedia	Uttrakhand - Anukriti Gusain
Beauty with a Purpose	Tripura - Rinky Chakma
Best National Costume	Arunachal Pradesh - Licha Thosum
Miss Fashion Icon	Rajasthan - Aditi Hundia
Miss Vivacious	Goa - Audrey D'Silva
Miss Goodness Ambassador	Bihar - Priyanka Kumari
Miss Popular	Mizoram - Rody H Vanlalhriatpuii
Miss Rampwalk	Bihar - Priyanka Kumari
Miss Body Beautiful	Jharkhand - Vamika Nidhi
Miss Refreshing Beauty	Uttarakhand - Anukriti Gusain
Best Makeover	Jammu and Kashmir - Sana Dua
Miss Glowing Skin	Assam - Triveni Barman
Miss Tech Diva	Uttar Pradesh - Shefali Sood
Miss Spectacular Eyes	Maharashtra - Aishwarya Devan
Miss Lifestyle	Maharashtra - Aishwarya Devan
Miss Active	Chhattisgarh - Vinali Bhatnagar
Miss Getaway Goddess	Rajasthan - Aditi Hundia
Miss Congeniality	Tripura - Rinky Chakma
Miss Beautiful Smile	Maharashtra - Aishwarya Devan
Miss Photogenic	Haryana - Manushi Chhillar
Miss Rising Star	Maharashtra - Aishwarya Devan
Miss Talented	Telangana - Simran Choudhary (Tie) Mizoram - Rody H Vanlalhriatpuii (Tie)

=== Best National Costume ===
Result	Contestant
Winner	Arunachal Pradesh - Licha Thosum
Top 9	Uttarakhand - Anukriti Gusain; Nagaland - Kaheli Chophy; Manipur - Kanchan Soibam; Tripura - Rinky Chakma; Mizoram - Rody H Vanlalhriatpuii; Assam - Triveni Barman; Chhattisgarh - Vinali Bhatnagar; Bihar - Priyanka Kumari

=== Body Beautiful ===
Result	Contestant
Winner	Jharkhand - Vamika Nidhi
Top 9	Goa - Audrey D'Silva; Haryana - Manushi Chhillar; Delhi - Maira Chowdhury; Karnataka - Swathi Muppala; Tamil Nadu - Sherlin Seth; Tripura - Rinky Chakma; Mizoram - Rody H Vanlalhriatpuii; Gujarat - Amardeep Kaur Syan

=== Miss Active ===
Result	Contestant
Winner	Chhattisgarh - Vinali Bhatnagar
Top 5	Karnataka - Swathi Muppala; Telangana - Simran Choudhary; Goa - Audrey D'Silva; Mizoram - Rody H Vanlalhriatpuii

== Contestants ==
The following is the list of the official delegates of Miss India 2019 representing 30 states of the country:

Color key

- Declared as Winner
- Ended as Runner-up
- Ended as one of the Finalists or Semi-finalists

Zone	State	Delegate	Height	Placement	Notes
East	Arunachal Pradesh	Licha Thosum	5 ft 6 in (1.68 m)	Top 15	Previously Mega Miss North East 2016 - 1st Runner-up
East	Assam	Triveni Barman	5 ft 5 in (1.65 m)	Top 15	Previously Eclectic Model Hunt 2011
East	Bihar	Priyanka Kumari	5 ft 7 in (1.70 m)	2nd Runner-up; Femina Miss India Intercontinental 2017	
East	Chhattisgarh	Vinali Bhatnagar	5 ft 7 in (1.70 m)		
East	Jharkhand	Vamika Nidhi	5 ft 9 in (1.75 m)		
East	Manipur	Kanchan Soibam	5 ft 6 in (1.68 m)		
East	Meghalaya	Kiran Laishram	5 ft 5 in (1.65 m)		
East	Mizoram	Rody H Vanlalhriatpuii	5 ft 8 in (1.73 m)	Top 15	Previously Miss Mizoram 2017
East	Nagaland	Kaheli Chophy	5 ft 7 in (1.70 m)		Previously Eclectic Model Hunt 2015 - 1st Runner-up; Previously Miss Nagaland 2014 - 1st Runner-up
East	Odisha	Christeena Biju	5 ft 9 in (1.75 m)		
East	Sikkim	Roshni Ghimirey	5 ft 7 in (1.70 m)		
East	Tripura	Rinky Chakma	5 ft 10 in (1.78 m)		Previously Mega Miss North East 2015 - 1st Runner-up
East	West Bengal	Shivankita Dixit	5 ft 7 in (1.70 m)		
North	Haryana	Manushi Chhillar	5 ft 9 in (1.75 m)	Femina Miss India 2017	Later Miss World 2017
North	Himachal Pradesh	Santoshi Ranaut	5 ft 7 in (1.70 m)		
North	Jammu and Kashmir	Sana Dua	5 ft 9 in (1.75 m)	1st Runner-up; Femina Miss India United Continents 2017	Previously Senorita India 2016 - 1st Runner-up; Later Miss United Continents 2017 - Top 10
North	Madhya Pradesh	Adya Shrivastava	5 ft 8 in (1.73 m)		
North	New Delhi	Maira Chowdhury	5 ft 8 in (1.73 m)	Top 15	
North	Punjab	Navpreet Kaur	5 ft 6 in (1.68 m)	Top 15	Previously Femina Miss India 2016 - Top 5
North	Uttarakhand	Anukriti Gusain	5 ft 6 in (1.68 m)	3rd Runner-up; Miss Grand India 2017	Previously Miss Asia Pacific World 2014 - 4th Runner-up; Previously Femina Miss India 2013 - Finalist; Later Miss Grand International - Top 20
North	Uttar Pradesh	Shefali Sood	5 ft 9 in (1.75 m)	Top 6	Later Miss India Supranational 2019 and Miss Supranational 2019 Top 16
South	Andhra Pradesh	Srishti Vyakaranam	5 ft 9 in (1.75 m)		
South	Karnataka	Swathi Muppala	5 ft 6 in (1.68 m)	Top 15	
South	Kerala	Mannat Singh	5 ft 10 in (1.78 m)	Top 15	
South	Tamil Nadu	Sherlin Seth	5 ft 5 in (1.66 m)		
South	Telangana	Simran Choudhary	5 ft 9 in (1.75 m)		
West	Goa	Audrey D'Silva	5 ft 5 in (1.65 m)	Top 15	Previously Miss India Worldwide India 2014 - 2nd Runner-up
West	Gujarat	Amardeep Kaur Syan	5 ft 8 in (1.73 m)		
West	Maharashtra	Aishwarya Devan	5 ft 5 in (1.65 m)	Top 6	
West	Rajasthan	Aditi Hundia	5 ft 6 in (1.68 m)	Top 15	Later Miss India Supranational 2018

== Crossovers ==
Miss Diva

- 2019: Shefali Sood Miss Supranational India
- 2018: Aditi Hundia (Miss Diva - Supranational)
- 2018: Shefali Sood (Top 10)
- 2016:Srishti Vyakarnam (top11)

Miss Asia Pacific World

- 2014: Anukriti Gusain (4th Runner up)

Miss Asia Pacific International

- 2016: Srishti Vyakaranam (Top 10)

Femina Miss India

- 2013: Anukriti Gusain(Top 5)
- 2016: Navpreet Kaur (Top 5)

Miss India Worldwide India

- 2014: Audrey D'Silva (2nd Runner up)

== Hosts ==
- Karan Johar
- Ritesh Deshmukh

== Judges ==
- Stephanie Del Valle - Miss World 2016
- Bipasha Basu - Bollywood Actress
- Arjun Rampal - Bollywood Actor
- Ileana D'Cruz - Bollywood Actress
- Abhishek Kapoor - Director and Producer
- Vidyut Jammwal - Bollywood Actor
- Manish Malhotra - Fashion Designer

== Panelists ==
- Personality Development Expert: Sanjeev Datta and Viram Datta
- Make-Up Coach: Clint Fernandes
- Fitness Partner: Samir and Namrata Purohit
- Skincare Expert: Dr Jamuna Pai
- Smile Care Expert: Dr Sandesh Mayekar
- Fashion Director: Kavita Lakhani
