= New Woman (magazine) =

Indian lifestyle magazine

- Anukriti Gusain on the February 2015 cover of New Woman
- Editor: Hema Malini
- Categories: Fashion and lifestyle
- Frequency: Monthly
- Circulation: 100,008
- Founded: December 1996
- Company: Pioneer Book Company Private Limited
- Country: India
- Based in: Mumbai
- Language: English
- Website: www.newwomanindia.com

New Woman is an Indian lifestyle magazine. It is published by Pioneer Book Company Private Limited. New Woman is based in Mumbai, India. Hema Malini is its editor.

== History and profile ==
The first edition was published in December 1996.

The magazine covers beauty, fashion, cosmetics, apparel, jewellery, the latest products, fitness, health, finance, career, self-help, relationships, sex, parenting, travel, art, music, books, cinema, social issues, legal matters, enterprise, and food. Its main focus is in-depth articles, stunning photo features, fashion and beauty spreads, fiction, and highly inspirational interviews. New Woman covers aspects of women's lives in language that is contemporary and young.

As of June 12, 2013, notable actress Hema Malini is the editor of the magazine.
