= Srinidhi Shetty =

Indian actress and beauty pageant titleholder (born 1992)

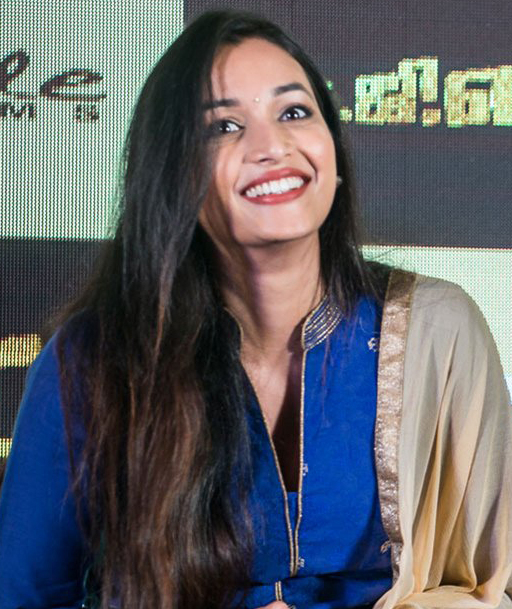
- Shetty in 2018
- Born: Srinidhi Ramesh Shetty; 21 October 1992 (age 34); Mangaluru, Karnataka, India
- Education: Jain University, Bengaluru
- Occupations: Model; actress
- Years active: 2009–present
- Title: Miss Supranational 2016

Srinidhi Shetty (born 21 October 1992) is an Indian model, actress and beauty pageant title holder, who primarily works in Kannada and Telugu films. At the Miss Diva 2016 pageant, Shetty was crowned Miss Diva Supranational. She later represented India and won the Miss Supranational 2016, thus becoming the second Indian to win the crown.

Shetty made her acting debut with the Kannada action duology KGF (2018–2022), which earned her the SIIMA Award for Best Actress – Kannada. She then ventured into Telugu films with the action thriller HIT: The Third Case (2025), which was a commercial success.

== Early life and education ==
Srinidhi Ramesh Shetty was born on 21 October 1992, in a Mangalorean family of Tuluvas belonging to the Bunt. Her father Ramesh Shetty is from the town of Mulki, and her mother Kushala is from Thalipady Guthu, Kinnigoli.

She was educated at Sri Narayana Guru English Medium School, followed by a pre-university course at St. Aloysius Pre-University College. She received a Bachelor of Electrical Engineering degree from Jain University, Bengaluru, and graduated with distinction.

== Pageantry ==
=== Miss South India ===
In 2012, Shetty competed in the Clean & Clear sponsored Fresh Face contest, where she was among the top two finalists. Later, she participated in Manappuram Miss South India in 2015 and won the titles of Miss Karnataka and Miss Beautiful Smile. Shetty further participated in Manappuram Miss Queen of India where she was crowned as the 1st runner up and was also named Miss Congeniality. She also worked as a model while being employed at Accenture.

=== Miss Diva ===
In 2016, Shetty participated in the 2016 Miss Diva pageant. She was selected as a finalist and was crowned the Miss Supranational India 2016 by Natasha Assadi. She also won three subtitles for her smile, body and her photogenic face. She went on to represent India at Miss Supranational 2016.

=== Miss Supranational ===
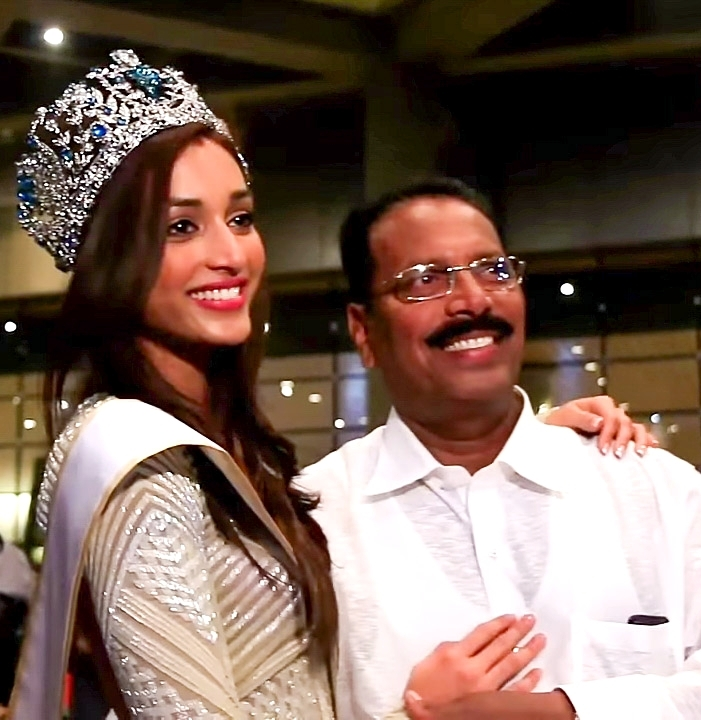
Shetty with her father following her win at Miss Supranational 2016

The Miss Supranational pageant was held at the MOSIR Arena in Krynica-Zdrój, Poland, on December 2, 2016. Shetty was crowned Miss Supranational 2016 by her predecessor Stephania Stegman of Paraguay. She also won the title of Miss Supranational Asia and Oceania 2016 in the pageant. Following her win, she became the second Indian to win the title.

During her reign as Miss Supranational 2016, Shetty travelled to several countries such as United Arab Emirates, France, Japan, Singapore, Thailand, and Slovakia. She also had numerous trips around Poland and India.

Shetty crowned her successor Jenny Kim of South Korea at the end of Miss Supranational 2017, which took place in Krynica-Zdrój, Poland on 1 December 2017.

== Acting career ==
=== Early work in action films (2018-2024) ===
Shetty made her acting debut with the 2018 Kannada period action film, KGF: Chapter 1 opposite Yash. It was directed by Prashanth Neel. She portrayed a head strong girl, Reena. The film was a box office success and became the highest grossing Kannada film of the year. Manoj Kumar R. of The Indian Express felt her character was "underwritten". Her performance earned her nominations for Filmfare Award for Best Female Debut – South and SIIMA Award for Best Female Debut – Kannada.

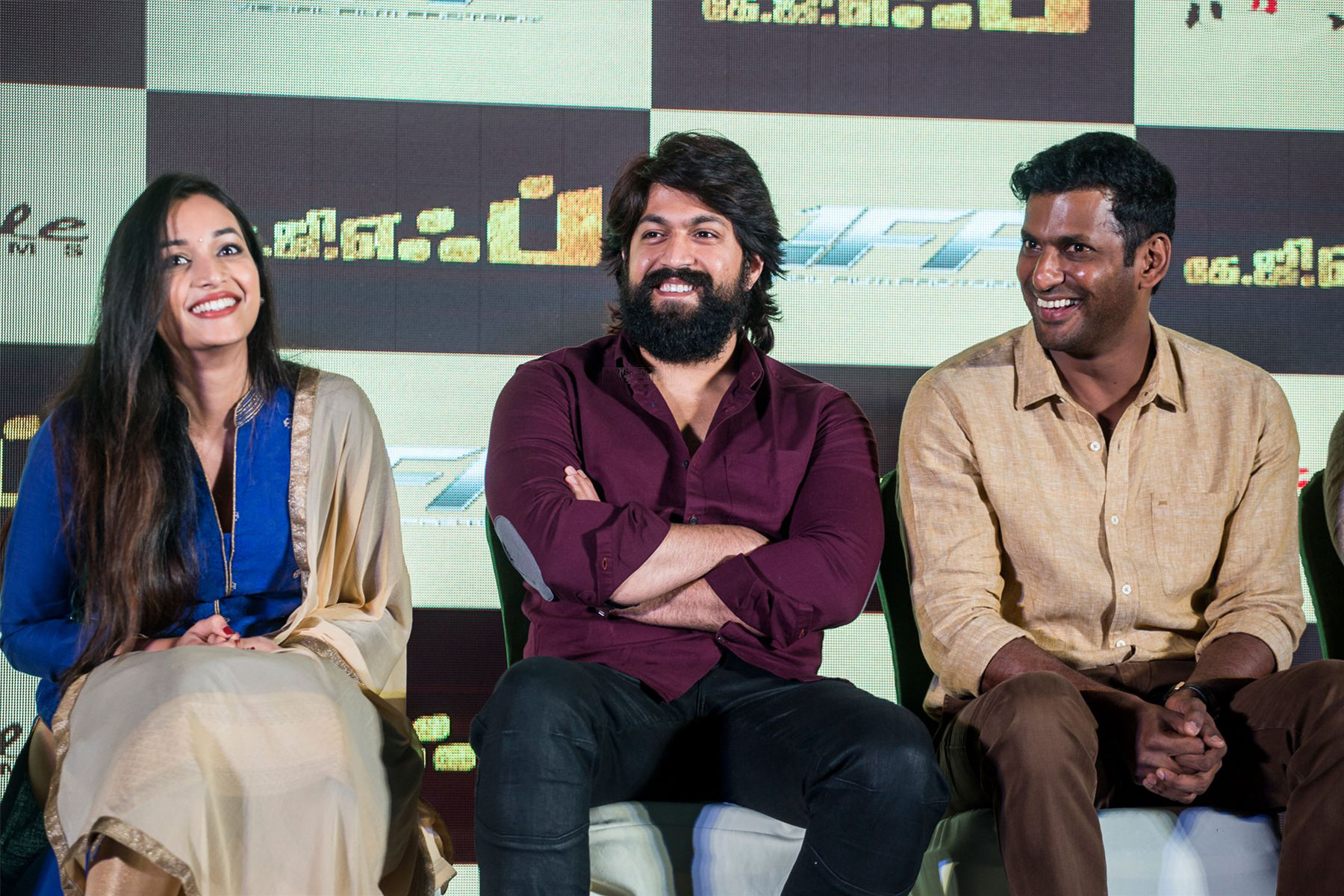
Shetty with Yash and Vishal for KGF: Chapter 1 promotions in 2019

In 2022, following a four year hiatus, she reprised her role of Reena in the film's sequel, KGF: Chapter 2. The film emerged as the second highest grossing Indian film of the year and the highest grossing Kannada film of all time. Both the films also rank among the highest-grossing Indian film of all time. Taran Adarsh from Bollywood Hungama stated, "Srinidhi looks stunning and delivers a worthy performance". Her performance earned her the SIIMA Award for Best Actress – Kannada. In the same year, Shetty made her Tamil debut with action thriller film Cobra alongside Vikram. The film was a box-office failure. She portrayed Bhavana, a criminology professor. Her character and the film received mixed reviews from critics.

=== Career progression (2025-present) ===
Following another three year hiatus, Shetty expanded to Telugu films in 2025 with HIT: The Third Case. She portrayed an IPS officer Mrudula, opposite Nani. Sangeeta Devi Dundoo of The Hindu noted, "Srinidhi is a welcome addition to the franchise, bringing both elegance and an unexpected twist to the narrative." The film became a commercial success and the sixth highest grossing Telugu film of the year. Her performance earned her nomination for SIIMA Award for Best Actress – Telugu. She then portrayed an IVF specialist Dr. Raaga in the Telugu film Telusu Kada opposite Siddhu Jonnalagadda. T. Maruthi Acharya of India Today stated, "Srinidhi leaves a strong mark in flashbacks and emotional sequences, giving Raaga depth and nuance with her performance." The film underperformed commercially.

2026 saw Shetty portray Swarna, a woman who runs a home business opposite Venkatesh in Aadarsha Kutumbam House No: 47 - AK47. Yashaswini Sri from The Indian Express was appreciative of her "first comedy role" and found her to be "a pleasant surprise". It became a box office success and emerged as the tenth highest grossing Telugu film of the year.

== In the media ==
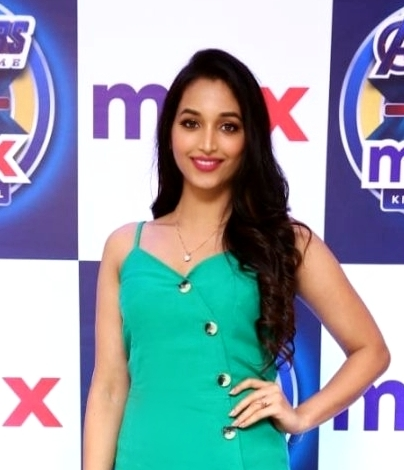
Shetty in 2019

Shetty was named the Times Most Desirable Women and Bangalore Times Most Desirable Women, both in 2016. In the Bangalore Times Most Desirable Women list, she was placed 4th in 2017, 2018 and 2019, and 5th in 2020. In Chennai Times' 30 Most Desirable Woman, she was placed 14th in 2019. She is one of the most followed Kannada actress on Instagram.

== Filmography ==
Key
†	Denotes films that have not yet been released

Year	Title	Role	Language	Notes	Ref.
2018	KGF: Chapter 1	Reena Desai	Kannada		
2022	KGF: Chapter 2	Reena Desai	Kannada		
2022	Cobra	Bhavana Menon	Tamil		
2025	HIT: The Third Case	ASP Mrudula IPS	Telugu		
2025	Telusu Kada	Dr. Raaga Kumar	Telugu		
2026	Aadarsha Kutumbam House No: 47 - AK47	Totti Swarna/ Bhavani	Telugu		
TBA	Anup Bhandari's next †	TBA	Kannada	Filming	

== Awards and nominations ==
Year	Award	Category	Film	Result	Ref.
2019	8th South Indian International Movie Awards	Best Female Debut – Kannada	KGF: Chapter 1	Nominated	
2019	66th Filmfare Awards South	Best Female Debut – South	KGF: Chapter 1	Nominated	
2023	11th South Indian International Movie Awards	Best Actress – Kannada	KGF: Chapter 2	Won	
2026	14th South Indian International Movie Awards	Best Actress – Telugu	HIT: The Third Case	Nominated	

Awards and achievements
Preceded by (Paraguay) Stephania Stegman	Miss Supranational; 2016	Succeeded by (South Korea) Jenny Kim
Preceded by (India) Aafreen Vaz	Miss Supranational Asia & Oceania; 2016	Succeeded by (Thailand) Jiraprapa Boonnuang
Preceded by Aafreen Rachael Vaz	Miss Diva Supranational; 2016	Succeeded by Peden Ongmu Namgyal
