= Aadarsha Kutumbam House No: 47 - AK47 =

2026 Indian film by Trivikram Srinivas

Aadarsha Kutumbam House No: 47 – AK47
- Theatrical release poster
- Directed by: Trivikram Srinivas
- Written by: Trivikram Srinivas
- Produced by: S. Radha Krishna
- Starring: Venkatesh; Srinidhi Shetty; Nara Rohith
- Cinematography: Ravi K. Chandran
- Edited by: Navin Nooli
- Music by: Thaman S
- Production companies: Haarika and Hassine Creations
- Distributed by: see below
- Release date: 30 October 2026
- Running time: 149 minutes
- Country: India
- Language: Telugu
- Box office: ₹74.35 crore

Aadarsha Kutumbam House No: 47 – AK47 (transl. Ideal Family House No: 47) is an 2026 Indian Telugu-language action comedy thriller film written and directed by Trivikram Srinivas. Produced by S. Radha Krishna under the Haarika & Hassine Creations, it stars Venkatesh and Srinidhi Shetty while Nara Rohith, Nivetha Pethuraj, and Yuvina Parthavi play supporting roles.

The film is officially announced in 15 August 2025 under the tentative title Venky77, as it is Venkatesh's 77th film in a leading role. Principal photography for this film began in Hyderabad on 10 December 2025. The film has music composed by Thaman S, cinematography handled by Ravi K Chandran, and editing by Navin Nooli.

Aadarsha Kutumbam House No: 47 theatrically released on 30 October 2026. It received mixed to positive reviews from critics. Despite the positive reviews, it grossed only ₹74.35 crores and did not perform well at the box office.

== Plot ==
A middle-class family led by Chittibabu (Venkatesh) wins a ₹100 crore lottery and moves into House No. 47, only to attract a dacoit gang and face hidden tensions as their seemingly ideal household unravels.

== Cast ==
- Venkatesh as Totti Chittibabu / Totti Arjun Prasad
- Srinidhi Shetty as Totti Swarna / Bhavani, Chittibabu's wife
- Yuvina Parthavi as Totti Sampoorna / Kamilini, Chittibabu and Swarna's daughter
- Raja Prajwal as Totti Sharwa / Prabhas, Chittibabu and Swarna's son
- Nara Rohith as ACP Damodar "Daamu" Naidu IPS
- Nivetha Pethuraj as Malathi "Maala"
- Udaybir Sandhu as Chandan Mahatho
- Nikitin Dheer as Suraj Bhan, Chandan's Boss
- Satya as Chittaranjan, "Chettaranjan"
- Nassar as Judge Pradeep Sarkar
- Sachin Khedekar as DGP
- Rao Ramesh as DSP Bruhaspati
- Brahmaji as Jailer, Bruhaspati’s brother-in-law
- Kedar Shankar as Juvenile Warden, Bruhaspati’s friend
- Raghu Babu as Bujji, Real-estate Broker
- Shafi as Ghanshyam, Chandan’s brother
- Aakash Srinivas as Pinto, Chandan’s nephew
- Deviyani Sharma as Nila, Chandan’s sister
- Gnaneshwari Kandregula as SI Maheswari, Daamu’s assistant
- Amit Tiwari as Kittu, Bhavani’s ex-husband
- Sudharshan as Traffic Police
- Chammak Chandra as Auto Driver
- Ananth Babu as Colony Secretary
- Rajitha as Colony Member
- Jaffer Sadiq as Viper
- Pammi Sai as Murthy, Colony Member
- Pramodini Pammi as Chittaranjan’s wife
- Jai Krishna as Mechanic Abdullah, Sampoorna’s boyfriend
- Srinivas Vadlamudi as Chitti Babu’s manager
- Dimple Hayathi as an unnamed celebrity in the "Narayanamma" song (cameo appearance)

== Production ==
=== Development ===
In 15 August 2025, Haarika and Hassine Creations officially launched a film project featuring actor Venkatesh and director Trivikram Srinivas, tentatively titled Venky77, a reference to it being the 77th film to star Venkatesh. In the same day, the film crew held a muhurtham pooja ceremony. In addition to Venkatesh and Trivikram, producer S. Naga Vamsi was also present. Producer D. Suresh Babu switched on the camera for the muhurat shot. Produced by S. Radha Krishna, Venky 77 is the eighth film from Haarika & Hassine Creations. Prior to this, the last collaboration between Trivikram and Venkatesh dates back to Nuvvu Naaku Nachav (2001), for which Trivikram wrote the story and dialogue.

The makers also planned to invite composer Harshavardhan Rameshwar to score the film. According to reports, the official title of this film may be Bandhu Mitrula Abhinandanalatho. In 10 December 2025, the makers announced the official title as Aadarsha Kutumbam House No: 47 – AK47. This is a family entertainer film, in which Venkatesh plays Chittibabu, the pillar of the family who is deeply loved by his relatives.

The film’s technical team includes composer Thaman S, cinematographer Ravi K Chandran, editor Navin Nooli, action director Kevin Kumar, and art director A.S. Prakash. Cinematographer Sanu Varghese and editor Sreekar Prasad were both part of the technical team, but subsequently left the project.

=== Casting ===
In September 2025, it was reported that Trivikram was considering Srinidhi Shetty for the film's female lead. According to reports from December, Shetty has been confirmed for the lead female role. Nara Rohith, Yuvina Parthavi, Raja Prajwal, Nivetha Pethuraj, Rao Ramesh, Satya, Brahmaji, Udaybir Sandhu, Vennela Kishore, and Raghu Babu has also signed on to appear in this film.

In 19 November 2026, Pujita Ponnada stated that she had auditioned and been cast in the film; however, after five days of filming during the first phase, the production team replaced her without prior notice. The single scene she participated in was not even credited.

=== Filming ===
In September 2025, it was reported that the film would officially begin principal photography on 6 October, with the first phase of filming to take place in Hyderabad. Principal photography officially begins on 10 December 2025. The production crew began filming at the Aluminium Factory, Hyderabad. According to rumors, Trivikram has a habit of rewriting scenes and dialogue on the fly while on set, a working style for which he is well known. As of July 2026, production of this film has reached its final stages.

== Music ==
The music of the film is composed by Thaman S. The first song from the film, "Narayanamma", was released on 27 September 2026. (Note: Originally scheduled for 22 September 2026.) The second song, "Maala", was released on 19 October 2026. The remaining six tracks from this release will be published on 29 October 2026.

Track listing
No.	Title	Lyrics	Singer(s)	Length
1.	"Narayanamma"	Ramajogayya Sastry	Ram Miriyala, Prabha	4:06
2.	"Maala"	Ramajogayya Sastry	Thaman S, Dhanunjay Seepana, Ranina Reddy	4:04
3.	"Pony Tail Pilla"	Saraswati Putra Ramajogayya Sastry	Thaman S, Srikrishna	3:04
4.	"Bandik"	Adviteeya Vojjala	Thaman S, Romy	2:31
5.	"Bling"	Adviteeya Vojjala	Thaman S, Bjorn Surrao	3:19
6.	"Chori"	Adviteeya Vojjala	Thaman S, Adviteeya Vojjala	2:31
7.	"Pakkad"	Adviteeya Vojjala	Thaman S, Sruthi Ranjani	3:16
8.	"Soul Of AK 47"	Thaman S	Thaman S	2:28
Total length:				25:21

== Release ==
=== Theatrical Release ===
Aadarsha Kutumbam House No: 47 – AK47 released on 30 October 2026, one week before Diwali. Previously, the film was scheduled for release on 2 October 2026, and 9 October 2026.

This film has been granted a U/A certificate by the Central Board of Film Certification (CBFC).

=== Distribution ===
Mythri Movie Makers is handling the distribution of this film in the Nizam region. The film's U.S. distributor is Shloka Entertainments. Distribution rights for the UK and Europe have been acquired by DreamZ Entertainment and Samaya Entertainment. Tolly Movies is the distributor for this film in Australia and New Zealand. Nikumbala Movies is handling the distribution of this film in Canada.

=== Home media ===
The post-theatrical digital streaming rights of the film were acquired by Netflix.

== Reception ==
=== Box office ===
The film’s total global box office collection on its opening day stood at ₹20.15 crore, with ₹10.80 crore coming from the states of Andhra Pradesh and Telangana. On its second day of release, the film’s global box office total reached ₹36.45 crore. The film’s total box office for the three-day weekend reached ₹53.70 crore. The film didn’t perform well at the box office despite good reviews.

=== Critical response ===
Sashidhar Adivi of Filmfare gave 3/5 stars and wrote "An interesting aspect of Aadarsha Kutumbam is the non-stereotypical nature of its principal characters. Each character has a troubled past, and Trivikram Srinivas deftly navigates the complex intersection of familial bonds and criminal intrigue. He manages to craft a narrative that is humorous yet poignantly dramatic. The writing blends the gritty realism of everyday life with the intimate struggles of a family teetering on the brink of breakdown." 123telugu.com gave 3/5 stars and wrote "On the whole, Aadarsha Kutumbam House No. 47 is a decent entertainer. The first half works really well, thanks to the healthy comedy from Venkatesh, Srinidhi Shetty, and Satya. The interval episode is a major highlight. However, the less impressive second half, underwritten characters, and lack of strong emotional moments make the film a bit dull in places. Despite these shortcomings, it is an entertaining family watch, offering a decent mix of fun and action."

Latha Srinivasan of NDTV gave 2.5/5 stars and wrote "There was a lot expected from the Venkatesh-Trivikram Srinivas combination after two decades, but unfortunately Aadarsha Kutumbam is just a run-of-the-mill family entertainer with a few laughs and sans surprises or novelty." At the same time, she praised Ravi K. Chandran’s cinematography, though she noted that the songs composed by Thaman S failed to leave a lasting impression.

Yashaswini Sri of The Indian Express gave the film a 2/5 stars rating, noting that while the first half is highly entertaining, the second half drags the film down. BVS Prakash of Deccan Chronicle gave 1.5/5 stars and wrote "His [Trivikram] effort to explore a different genre is understandable, but the weak plot and screenplay, unconvincing characterisation, and confused narrative make Adarsha Kutumbham a largely forgettable experience." Sruthi Ganapathy Raman of The Hollywood Reporter India criticized Trivikram's script for lacking logic, causing the film's plot to gradually lose its direction.
