= Femina Miss India Bangalore 2013 =

Femina Miss India Bangalore is a beauty pageant in India that annually selects three winners to compete nationally . The winner of Femina Miss India Bangalore vies in Miss India. It is organized by Femina, a women's magazine published by Bennett, Coleman & Co. Ltd. The Times Group also conducts a stand-alone contest called Indian Diva to select a representative to Miss Universe .

== Final results ==
Result	Contestant
Femina Miss India Bangalore	Sobhita Dhulipala
1st runner-up	Panchami Rao
2nd runner-up	Deborah Doris Fell
TOP 5 Finalist	Manisha Undale; Madhuri Manohar
Top 11	Akhila Kishore; Anushka Shah; Madhuri M; Nabha Natesh; Shimagne Rajan; Zeenat Singh

=== Sub Contest Awards ===
Award	Contestant
MISS ADVENTUROUS	Sobhita Dhulipala
MISS BODY BEAUTIFUL	Deborah Doris Fell
MISS CONGENIALITY	Zeenat Singh
MISS EYE CONIC EYES	Manisha Undale
MISS FASHION ICON	Sobhita Dhulipala & Akhila Kishore
MISS GLOWING SKIN	Madhuri M
MISS INTELLECTUAL	Nabha Natesh
MISS STYLISH HAIR	Sobhita Dhulipala
MISS TIMELESS BEAUTY	Shimagne Rajan

== Contestants ==
Contestant	Age	Hometown
Akhila Kishore	23	Bangalore
Anushka Shah	19	Hyderabad
Deborah Doris Fell	21	Hyderabad
Madhuri M	22	Bangalore
Manisha Undale	21	Belgaum
Madhuri Manohar	21	Bangalore
Nabha Natesh	22	Mangalore
Panchami Rao	19	Hyderabad
Shimagne Rajan	21	Bangalore
Sobhita Dhulipala	20	Visakhapatnam
Zeenat Singh	20	Bangalore

=== Judges ===
- Sarah-Jane Dias
- Rochelle Maria Rao
- Ragini Dwivedi
- Ritu Kumar
- Karan Johar.
