= Manasa Varanasi =

Indian actress and model (born 1997)

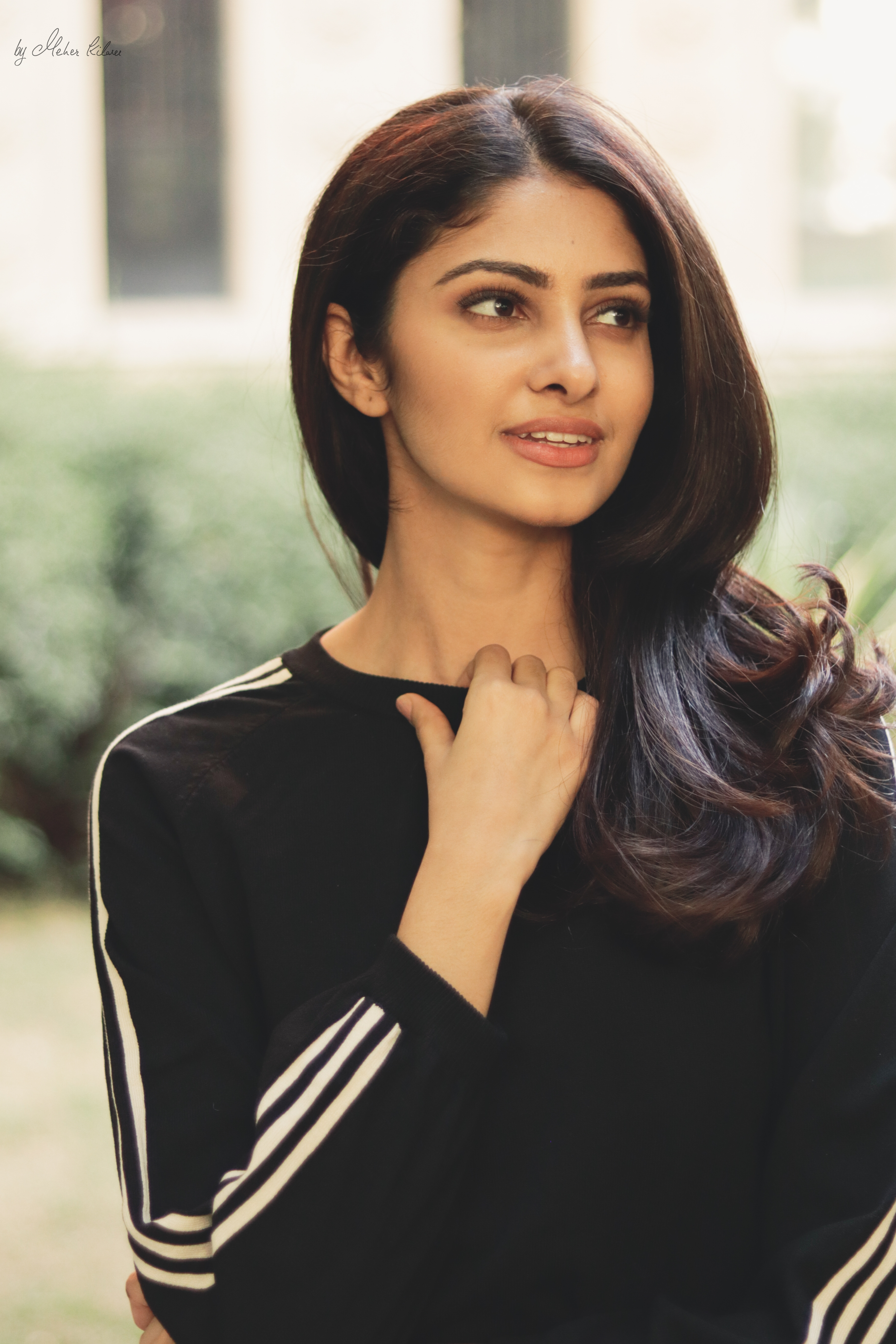
- Manasa in 2020
- Born: 21 March 1997 (age 29); Hyderabad, Andhra Pradesh, (now in Telangana) India
- Education: Vasavi College of Engineering
- Occupation: Actress,
- Beauty pageant titleholder
- Title: Femina Miss India 2020; Miss India World 2020
- Major competitions: Miss Telangana 2019 (Top 3); Miss Telangana 2020 (Winner); Femina Miss India 2020 (Winner); Miss World 2022 (Top 13)

Manasa Varanasi (born 21 March 1997) is an Indian actress and beauty pageant titleholder who was crowned Femina Miss India 2020. She later represented India at Miss World 2021, where she reached the top 13. Manasa made her acting debut with Devaki Nandana Vasudeva (2024) and received success with Couple Friendly (2026).

== Early life and education ==
Manasa was born in Hyderabad to Ravisankar and Shailaja. She moved to Singapore at a young age due to her father's job and attended the Global Indian International School and completed her grade 10 there. Later she returned to India, and completed her intermediate then studied computer science at the Vasavi College of Engineering in Hyderabad. After graduating with a computer science degree, she began work as a financial information exchange analyst at FactSet, in Hyderabad. She won the Miss Fresher title in the first year of her college.

== Pageantry ==
Manasa won Femina Miss India 2020, representing the state of Telangana, on 10 February 2021. She was crowned as Femina Miss India World 2020 by the outgoing titleholder Miss World 2019 second runner-up and Miss World Asia Suman Rao, at the Hyatt Regency, Mumbai. During the pageant's sub-contest ceremony, she won the Miss Rampwalk award.

Manasa represented India at Miss World 2021, on 16 March 2022 at Coca-Cola Music Hall, San Juan, Puerto Rico. She was placed among the top 13 contestants.

Manasa advocated strengthening child protection laws in India for her beauty with a purpose project. She also spoken about, "We Can", an awareness campaign against sexual abuse of children.

== Acting career ==
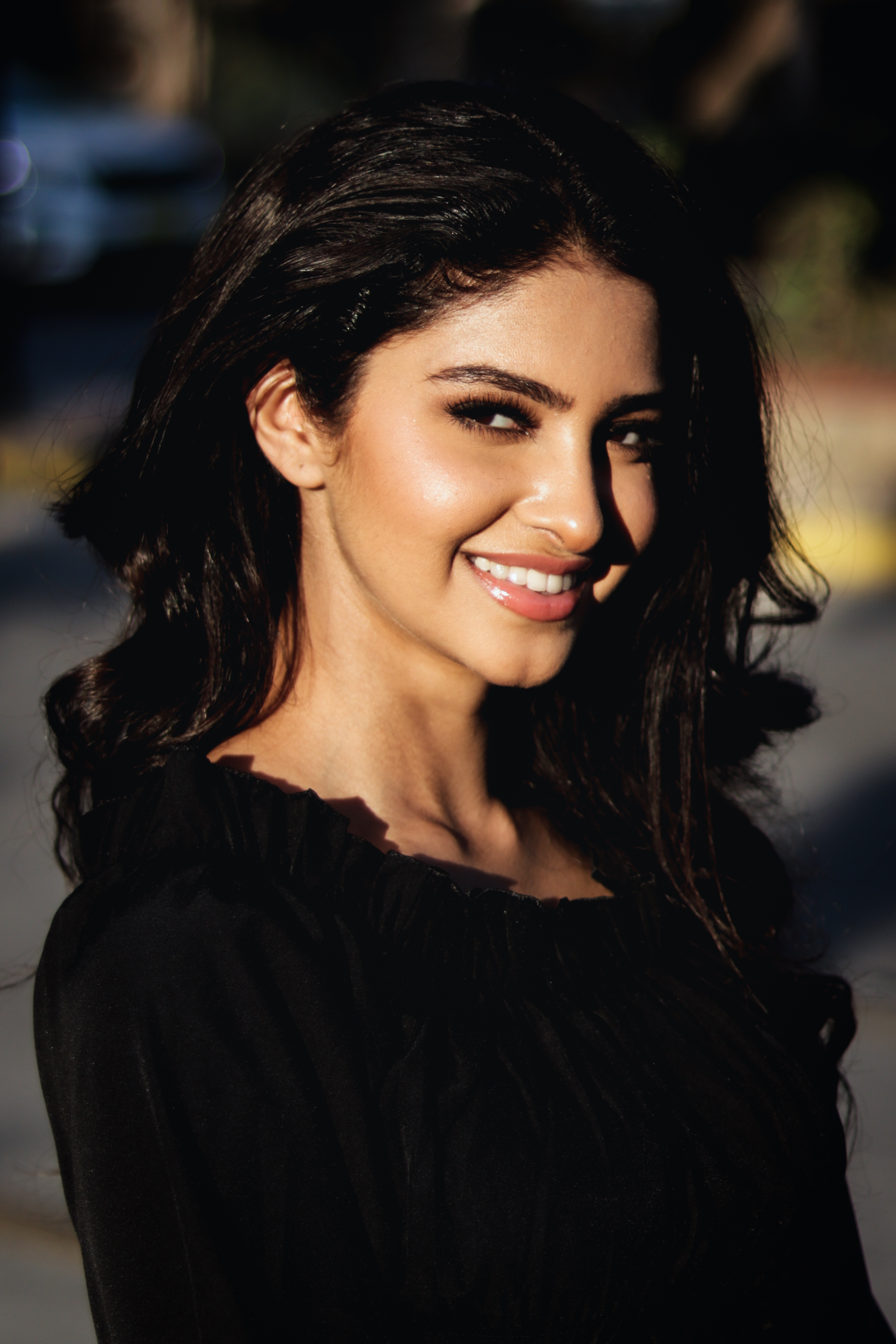
Manasa in 2022

Four years after her Miss India win, Manasa made her acting debut with the 2024 Telugu film Devaki Nandana Vasudeva. She played three roles opposite Ashok Galla. The film received mixed reviews from critics and failed commercially.

In 2026, Manasa played a software engineer opposite Santosh Sobhan in the Telugu film Couple Friendly. Srivathsan Nadadhur of The Hindu noted, "Manasa plays an ambitious modern girl with a quiet strength — showcasing both Mithra’s resilience and vulnerabilities with an adept mix of assurance and innocence. Both leads share a terrific on-screen camaraderie." The film became a commercial success.

== Filmography ==
Year	Title	Role	Notes	Ref.
2024	Devaki Nandana Vasudeva	Satya, Radha, Rukmini		
2026	Couple Friendly	Mithra		
2027	George Krish †	TBA	Filming	

Awards and achievements
Preceded by Suman Rao	Femina Miss India; 2020	Succeeded by Sini Shetty
Preceded by Sanjana Vij	Femina Miss Telangana; 2020	Succeeded by Pragnya Ayyagari
