= Couple Friendly =

2026 Indian Telugu-language film

- Theatrical release poster
- Directed by: Ashwin Chandrasekar
- Written by: Ashwin Chandrasekar
- Produced by: Ajay Kumar Raju P
- Starring: Santosh Sobhan; Manasa Varanasi
- Cinematography: Dinesh Purushothaman
- Edited by: Ganesh Siva
- Music by: Aditya Ravindran
- Production companies: UV Concepts; VR Global Media
- Distributed by: Dheeraj Cinema
- Release date: 14 February 2026
- Running time: 121 minutes
- Country: India
- Language: Telugu
- Budget: Approx 1.5 crore INR
- Box office: ₹14 crore

Couple Friendly is a 2026 Indian Telugu-language romantic drama film written and directed by Ashwin Chandrasekar. It is produced by Ajay Kumar Raju P under the banners of UV Concepts and VR Global Media. The film stars Santosh Sobhan and Manasa Varanasi.

Couple Friendly was released theatrically on 14 February 2026, coinciding with Valentine's Day.

== Plot ==
Siva Sai Prathap (Santosh Shobhan) is an easy-going man who moves to Chennai from Nellore under family pressure to find a job as an interior designer. To support himself, he works as a bike taxi rider.

Mithra (Manasa Varanasi) from Chittoor is searching for a job as a software engineer in Chennai. After several unsuccessful attempts, she meets Siva. Having to vacate her accommodation, Mithra struggles to find a new place. Siva accompanies her as they search across Chennai, but with no success. He eventually offers her a place to stay at his home so they can share the rent, and she reluctantly agrees.

Mithra helps Siva build a professional profile for his interior design work. He soon lands a small project, completes it successfully, and gradually secures more contracts. While continuing her job search, Mithra assists Siva with his work, and their relationship gradually blossoms into love. They move into a larger apartment, and Mithra asks Siva to speak to her father about their marriage. However, a misunderstanding leads to an argument, and Mithra moves out to stay with her friend Preethi.

Meanwhile, Siva's family arrives in Chennai for his sister-in-law's medical treatment. Around the same time, Mithra's parents visit the city to arrange a marriage alliance for her. Realising Mithra's importance in his life, Siva meets her, and they reconcile at Preethi's apartment. However, they are discovered by Mithra's parents.

Both families meet at a restaurant, where Siva's parents express their approval of the relationship. Mithra's father, however, refuses to accept it and takes her back to their hometown. Mithra falls into severe emotional distress and is later hospitalised. She is diagnosed with a frontotemporal memory disorder and remains under treatment for six months, during which Siva cares for her devotedly.

At Mithra's request, Siva takes her to Kerala to help her recover outside the hospital environment. Their bond deepens, but her condition gradually worsens. Their families visit them in Kerala during this time.

Eventually, Mithra's father recognises Siva's genuine love for her. However, Mithra's condition deteriorates further, and she loses her memory completely before passing away.

After her death, Siva reads a diary written by Mithra on the terrace of their former home. In it, she encourages him to move forward in life.

The film concludes with the message: "Life is all about sudden goodbyes, handle with care."

== Cast ==
- Santosh Sobhan as Siva Sai Prathap
- Manasa Varanasi as Mithra
- Rajeev Kanakala as Mithra's father
- Goparaju Ramana as Siva's father
- Dheeraj Reddy as Siva’s brother
- Livingston as M. Thumbathigam Sekar
- Yogi Babu as Shankar Anna
- Sunil Reddy as Raghu, Preethi’s boyfriend
- Narasimha
- Bhargav Ram
- Vijay Vallabhaneni
- Sriranjani as Mithra's mother
- Pramodini Pammi as Siva’s mother
- Anjali Nair as Siva's sister-in-law
- Fouziee as Preethi, Mithra’s friend
- Himaa Varma
- Dharani V.
- Savithri as Hostel Warden

Uncredited

- Arthana Binu as Shailu, Siva's ex-girlfriend (cameo appearance)
- Rishikanth as Karthik, Mithra’s fiancee

== Production ==
Ashwin Chandrasekar, a former assistant director of Pandiraaj, wrote the script in Tamil, which was later translated into Telugu, with the crew improvising the dialogues during filming. In May 2025, Santosh Sobhan stated in an interview that filming for Couple Friendly was in its final stage. Principal photography took place in Chennai, Tamil Nadu. The film's distributor, Dheeraj Mogilineni, stated that the film received an 'A' certificate from the Central Board of Film Certification due to its title.

== Music ==
The music was composed by Aditya Ravindran.

Track listing
No.	Title	Lyrics	Singer(s)	Length
1.	"O Nesthamai"	Rehman	Aditya Ravindran	2:52
2.	"Naa Praanam"	Purna Chary	Kapil Kapilan	4:10
3.	"Varaale Panche"	Rehman	Pradeep Kumar	3:12
4.	"Gaabara Gaabara"	Rakendu Mouli	Santhosh Narayanan	2:50
5.	"Naalo Nenu"	Ramajogayya Sastry	Sanjith Hegde, Aditya Ravindran	3:05
6.	"Naa Kallalo"	Rakendu Mouli	Shakthisree Gopalan	3:24
7.	"Naato Raa Ila"	Purna Chary	Kapil Kapilan	2:28
8.	"Baundhi Baandham"	Rakendu Mouli	Sublahshini	1:50
Total length:				23:51

== Release ==
Couple Friendly was released theatrically on 14 February 2026.

== Reception ==
Sandeep Athreya of Sakshi Post rated the film 3.25 out of 5 stars and wrote, "While the second half may not fully match the emotional depth of the first, the film’s honesty, grounded storytelling, and the lovely chemistry between the leads make it a worthwhile watch." Yashaswini Sri of The Indian Express rated the film 3 out of 5 stars and wrote, "Ashwin Chandrasekar's latest offers genuine moments and strong performances but suffers from a familiar plot and jarring tonal shifts."

Srivathsan Nadadhur of The Hindu wrote, "Couple Friendly may not boast a novel plot, but its narrative rhythm is refreshingly mature and modern. It treats both its protagonists as equals and values the minutiae of their lives as well as the big dreams." Jalapathi Gudelli of Telugucinema.com rated the film 2.75 out of 5 stars and wrote, "Couple Friendly works because of its engaging first half and emotionally effective climax. The twist feels familiar due to a recent Bollywood blockbuster, yet the treatment and sincere performances make it a decent watch." A critic from Eenadu also reviewed the film.
