= Devaki Nandana Vasudeva =

2024 Indian Telugu-language film by Arjun Jandyala

- Theatrical release poster
- Directed by: Arjun Jandyala
- Screenplay by: Arjun Jandyala
- Dialogues by: Sai Madhav Burra
- Story by: Prasanth Varma
- Produced by: Somineni Balakrishna
- Starring: Ashok Galla; Devayani; Manasa Varanasi; Devdatta Nage
- Cinematography: Prasad Murella; Rasool Ellore
- Edited by: Tammiraju
- Music by: Bheems Ceciroleo
- Production company: Lalithambika Productions
- Release date: 22 November 2024
- Country: India
- Language: Telugu

Devaki Nandana Vasudeva is a 2024 Indian Telugu-language action drama film co-written and directed by Arjun Jandyala, from a story written by Prasanth Varma. The film features Ashok Galla, Manasa Varanasi and Devdatta Nage in lead roles.

The dialogues are written by Sai Madhav Burra and the music is composed by Bheems Ceciroleo. The film was released on 22 November 2024.

== Plot ==
The film opens with a gangster, Devendra, boasting about filing a police complaint against Kansa Raju, a rival, powerful gangster, confident that this move would ensure his dominance over a valuable piece of land. Simultaneously, at Kansa Raju's house, a Havan ritual was underway. Women gathered to pray, and one curious woman asked about the purpose of the Havan. The other explained that Kansa Raju had arranged this sacred ceremony for his sister, who was about to give birth. Out of love, he had even invited his brother-in-law to stay close and support his sister during this important time. However, just as the ceremony reached its peak, the police arrived with the intention of arresting Kansa Raju. They learned he was not home but would return shortly, prompting the police to wait patiently. The narrative swiftly shifts back to Devendra, where the tension escalates. As Kansa Raju arrives, Devendra's men face a fatal encounter. Kansa Raju, retaliating fiercely, begins eliminating them one by one. Devendra, witnessing the carnage, pleads for mercy, promising to withdraw his complaint, but Kansa Raju mercilessly kills him.

Upon returning home, Kansa Raju finds the police waiting. He confidently asserts that a complaint against a dead man cannot hold water, and they require evidence to proceed, which leaves the officers frustrated and forces them to leave empty-handed. Following this, he completes the Havan, and the priest instructs him to visit Kashi and bathe in the holy Ganges, marking a new phase in his life. In Kashi, destiny takes a turn when Kansa Raju witnesses a man suddenly collapse and die on the stairs. An Aghori, a mystic of sorts, appears and tells him that God wishes him to live a little longer, as this is part of a divine plan. However, Kansa Raju's arrogance blinds him to the truth as he declares that he cannot die and is the end of all. The Aghori, unfazed, prophesies that his sister's third child will be the cause of his demise, a prediction that sends shivers down Kansa Raju's spine. When Kansa Raju returns home, just as he fears, his sister is ready to give birth, but the police arrive again. In a shocking twist, he learns that it was none other than Devendra's younger brother Bhupati who testified against him, leading to his imprisonment for 14 years.

The story then shifts forward several years, showcasing the festive spirit of Janmashtami in the village. Here, we are introduced to a vibrant competition to break the Dahi Handi—a symbol of Lord Krishna's mischief—where a young hero named Krishna is determined to earn glory for himself. As Ranga, Kansa Raju's henchman, competes against Krishna, a chaotic clash occurs. In the thick of it, Krishna stands tall, breaking the Dahi Handi and winning admiration from the villagers. However, his triumph is short-lived when his mother, anxious after consulting a priest, learns of a dire prediction regarding Krishna's fate—either he will face imminent danger or bring doom upon another. This news weighs heavily on her heart, as Krishna is her third son, with the previous two having died shortly after birth.

Krishna's mother, desperate to protect her son, gives him a protective amulet. Meanwhile, Krishna spots a beautiful girl named Satya at the temple and is captivated by her. However, she is swiftly escorted away by Ranga, her protective bodyguard. Krishna, intrigued and determined, begins to seek more information about Satya and learns about her constant company. The following day, he takes matters into his own hands, chasing Ranga's car and effectively gaining Satya's attention by giving her his number. Satya begins to respond to Krishna's affections, and their relationship blossoms. During another temple visit, Krishna's mother praises Satya's saree while introducing her son. Seeking to speak with her privately, Krishna cleverly distracts his mother under the guise of performing rituals. Moments later, he witnesses an attack on a pregnant woman. Anger boiling inside him, Krishna fights off the assailants only to discover that the attacker is the woman's cruel husband. His act of bravery earns him admiration from Satya.

Meanwhile, Kansa Raju is brooding in prison. Flashbacks reveal that, consumed by rage, he killed a police officer while serving his term, resulting in a 21-year sentence. Presently, rumors swirl around that he will soon be released, prompting concern among his enemies. When Krishna proposes to Satya, their joyous moment is shattered by Ranga's men, who abduct her. Disheartened, Krishna seeks counsel from his friends and drowns his sorrows in alcohol. Compelled by a newfound determination, he resolves to find Satya. Upon reaching her house, he discovers an unexpected twist—three girls, all identical to Satya: Satyabhama, Satya Leela, and Satyavati. Shocked yet intrigued, Krishna learns from Anupriya, their mother, of the struggles she faced in raising her daughters alone while keeping their identities a secret from their uncle, Kansa Raju, who had once killed her husband to prevent her from giving birth to a third child.

As the story unfolds, Kansa Raju arranges a Havan for his niece, but Ranga grows suspicious when he notices differences among the girls. Sensing danger, he becomes increasingly wary as the days pass. When Kansa Raju finds out, his fury ignites. Meanwhile, Krishna and the sisters devise a plan to confuse Ranga further, utilizing a grand biryani feast that sees all three sisters take turns to maintain their cover. A conflict ensues, leading to a showdown. Kansa Raju learns of Bhupati's plans for revenge, leading to a climactic confrontation in his home. In the midst of chaos, Krishna intervenes, rescuing Satya but suffering injuries in the process. The intensity of the battle leads to an unexpected revelation—a doctor arrives to attend to Satya, but ends up being one of the sisters in disguise. Understanding their plight, Krishna vows to help them escape. He confronts Kansa Raju at the temple, provoking him to emerge with a deadly intent. The showdown culminates in fierce fighting, where Krishna's determination to protect his newfound family clashes with Kansa Raju's vicious intentions. Just when hope seems lost, divine intervention emerges as the Sudarshan Chakra from Lord Krishna's statue miraculously appears and decapitates Kansa Raju, bringing an end to his tyranny.

As the villagers witness this miraculous event, they proclaim it as the divine play of Lord Murli. With the evil vanquished and peace restored, Krishna becomes a hero in the eyes of the villagers, and Anupriya and her daughters finally rejoice in freedom.

== Cast ==
- Ashok Galla as Krishna
- Manasa Varanasi as Satya, Radha, Rukmini
- Devayani as Devaki
- Devdatta Nage as Kamsa Raju
- Jhansi
- Shatru as Ranga
- Naga Mahesh
- Sravan Raghavendra
- Sanjay Swaroop
- Getup Srinu

== Music ==
The background score and soundtrack is composed by Bheems Ceciroleo. The audio rights were acquired by Aditya Music.

Track list
No.	Title	Lyrics	Singer(s)	Length
1.	"Yemayyinde"	Suresh Gangula	Swarag Keerthan	4:33
2.	"Jai Bolo Krishna"	Raghuram	Swaraag Keerthan	3:21
3.	"Namo Eshwara"	Srinivasa Mouli Patri	Swaraag Keerthan	2:22
4.	"Bangaram"	Bhole Shavali	Simha Bhagavatula, Uma Neha	3:52

== Release ==
Devaki Nandana Vasudeva was initially scheduled to release on 14 November 2024. But, it was later released on 22 November 2024.

== Reception ==
Avad Mohammad of OTTPlay gave a rating of 2 out of 5 and stated that "The film's twists may have sounded good on paper, but their on-screen execution is underwhelming", while also mentioning that narration, editing, and screenplay are dull and uninspiring. Giving the same rating, Sashidhar Adivi of Times Now stated, "Devaki Nandana Vasudeva features a plot that has potential, but the opportunity goes begging due to poor execution".
