= Spotlight 2 (TV series) =

- Promotional poster
- Genre: Romance; Music
- Based on: Aashiqui 2
- Written by: Vikram Bhatt
- Story by: Vikram Bhatt
- Directed by: Sidhant Sachdev
- Creative director: Siddhant Sachdeva
- Starring: Karan Grover; Aditi Arya; Ruhi Singh
- Composers: Harish Sagane; Ankit Shah
- Country of origin: India
- Original language: Hindi
- No. of seasons: 1
- No. of episodes: 13

Production
- Producer: Vikram Bhatt
- Production location: Mumbai
- Camera setup: Multi-Camara
- Running time: 22 minutes approx
- Production company: VB On The Web

Original release
- Network: Viu; YouTube
- Release: 26 January 2018 – present

Related
- Spotlight

Spotlight 2 is an Indian romantic web series which premiered on 26 January 2017 and streaming on Viu. The show stars Karan Grover and Aditi Arya. It is produced and written by Vikram Bhatt and director by Sidhant Sachdev. The web series is based on life of a young great successful rockstar. It draws narrative influence from the movie Aashiqui 2.

== Plot ==
The story revolves around an upcoming rock star and musician Vicky (Karan Grover) who gets downhearted after losing the ability to sing and his ex-girlfriend Jyotika (Aditi Arya) helps him to rebuild his life.

== Cast ==
- Karan Grover as Vicky
- Aditi Arya as Jyotika
- Ruhi Singh as Deeya Sarkar
- Mehul Dawar as Anubhav
- Sayush Nayyar
