= Love Mouli =

2024 Indian romantic drama film

- Theatrical release poster
- Directed by: Avaneendra
- Starring: Navdeep; Pankhuri Gidwani
- Cinematography: Avaneendra
- Edited by: Avaneendra
- Music by: Govind Vasantha
- Production company: Nyra creations LLP
- Release date: 7 June 2024
- Country: India
- Language: Telugu

Love Mouli is a 2024 Indian Telugu-language romantic drama film directed by Avaneendra and produced by Nyra Creations LLP. The film stars Navdeep and Pankhuri Gidwani. Apart from directing the film, Avaneendra also serves as the cinematographer and editor.

== Cast ==
- Navdeep as Mouli
- Pankhuri Gidwani as Chitra
- Charvi Dutta

== Production ==
Love Mouli was conceived by director Avaneendra during his tenure as an associate writer on RRR. He developed the story in a novel-like format due to initial uncertainty regarding lead actors. He later considered several young Telugu actors before casting Navdeep in the lead role, notwithstanding his limited recent film activity as a lead actor. The film was subsequently promoted as Navdeep's comeback as a lead actor, with the term "Navdeep 2.0" being widely used. The film received an A certificate from the Central Board of Film Certification.

== Soundtrack ==
Love Mouli

Soundtrack album by Govind Vasantha
- Released: 4 January 2024
- Genre: Feature film soundtrack
- Length: 36:37
- Language: Telugu
- Label: Aditya Music
- Producer: Govind Vasantha

Govind Vasantha chronology
Blue Star (2024)	Love Mouli (2024)	Election (2024)

Singles from Love Mouli
- 1. "The Anthem of Love Mouli" Released: 15 September 2023

External audio
- Love Mouli – Jukebox on YouTube

The soundtrack was composed by Govind Vasantha. The first single, "The Anthem of Love Mouli" was released on 15 September 2023.

Track listing
No.	Title	Lyrics	Singer(s)	Length
1.	"The Anthem of Love Mouli"	Anantha Sriram	Anish Krishnan	3:25
2.	"Humming Alone"	Govind Vasantha	Govind Vasantha	3:02
3.	"The Vibe Of Mouli"	Anantha Sriram	Anish Krishnan	4:18
4.	"Mouli's Dream (Live)"	Govind Vasantha	Govind Vasantha	2:50
5.	"She is Real"	Anantha Sriram	Sarath Santhosh	4:20
6.	"Tear Drop On Violin"	Govind Vasantha	Govind Vasantha	2:14
7.	"The First Tear Drop"	Anantha Sriram	Zeba Tommy	3:48
8.	"Sita Ram"	Anantha Sriram	Chinmayi Sripaada	3:33
9.	"Aakasamlo Taara"	Anantha Sriram	Rohith Jayaraman	3:10
10.	"Into The Future"	Anantha Sriram	Zeba Tommy	4:01
11.	"Light In My Heart"	Govind Vasantha	Govind Vasantha	1:56
Total length:				36:37

== Release ==
=== Theatrical release ===
The film was initially slated for release on 19 April 2024. However, the release date was subsequently changed, and it was released on 7 June 2024.

=== Home media ===
The film's digital rights were acquired by Aha, and it premiered on the platform on 27 June 2024.

== Reception ==
Love Mouli received mixed reviews from critics, with praise for its moments of romance but criticism for its slow pace.

Paul Nicodemus of The Times of India rated the film two-and-a-half out of five stars and wrote, "Love Mouli is more than just a romantic drama; it is an evocative and visual journey that leaves an impression. While the film's bold narrative and unorthodox treatment may not appeal to everyone, those who appreciate the blend of romance with deeper existential themes will find this film rewarding."
