= Sana Dua =

Indian lawyer, motivational speaker, and model (Born: 1993)

- Born: 4 January 1993 (age 33); Assam
- Education: Army Public School Noida; Punjab University
- Occupations: Model; Lawyer
- Height: 177 cm (5 ft 10 in)
- Beauty pageant titleholder
- Title: Femina Miss India Jammu and Kashmir 2017
- Major competitions: Miss India International 2016 (1st Runner-up); Femina Miss India 2017 (1st Runner-up); Miss United Continents 2017 (Top 10)

Sana Dua is an Indian lawyer, motivational speaker, model and beauty pageant titleholder, who was declared as the Brand Ambassador of Election Commission Jammu & Kashmir for Lok Sabha Election 2019 by ECI. She won the title of Femina Miss India United Continents at Femina Miss India 2017. and became the First Miss India from J&K.

She represented India at Miss United Continents 2017 contest in Guayaquil, Ecuador in September 2017 and made it to the top 10.

== Early life and background ==
Sana was born in Assam, India to a Sikh family, whose roots are in Jammu and Kashmir. She finished her graduation in law at Punjab University in Chandigarh.

== After Miss India Competition ==
She launched her own startup, 'Image And Beyond By Sana Dua' in 2019 which intends to help young girls find their true potential towards modeling and pageantry.

She was appointed as State Director for Miss India Universe in April 2024.

Awards and achievements
Preceded by (India); Lopamudra Raut	Miss United Continents India; 2017	Succeeded by (India); Gayatri Bharadwaj
