= Pankhuri Gidwani =

Indian actress

- Occupations: Model, Actress

Pankhuri Gidwani is an Indian actress who appeared in Hindi films and television. Pankhuri was 2nd Runner Up in Femina Miss India 2016. In 2021, Pankhuri was appointed Uttar Pradesh's first brand ambassador for Khadi.

== Early life ==
She completed her schooling from La Martiniere Girls' College, Lucknow. Pankhuri scored 97.25 percent in the Indian School Certificate for Class XII examinations, 2017.

== Career ==
Pankhuri was designated Miss Grand India 2016 and represented India at Miss Grand International 2016 held in USA. She played a lead role in a Telugu film Love Mouli.

She worked in many television and OTT drama series, such as Kavya – Ek Jazbaa, Ek Junoon, Leaked!, Ujda Chaman.

== Filmography ==
- Note: all work is in Hindi, unless otherwise noted.

=== Films ===
Year	Title	Role	Notes
2019	Ujda Chaman	Reema	
2021	Gulabi Revdi	Herself	Special appearance
2023	Ishq-e-Nadaan	—N/a	
2024	Love Mouli	Chitra	Telugu film
2025	Tu Meri Main Tera Main Tera Tu Meri	Tanya	

=== Television ===
Year	Title	Role	Notes
2024	Kavya – Ek Jazbaa, Ek Junoon	IPS Anubha Mathur	

=== Web series ===
Year	Title	Role	Notes
2023	Leaked!	Rubina	
2023	Charlie Chopra & The Mystery Of Solang Valley	Young Janki	
