= Moa Madicken Öberg =

Swedish fashion model and beauty queen

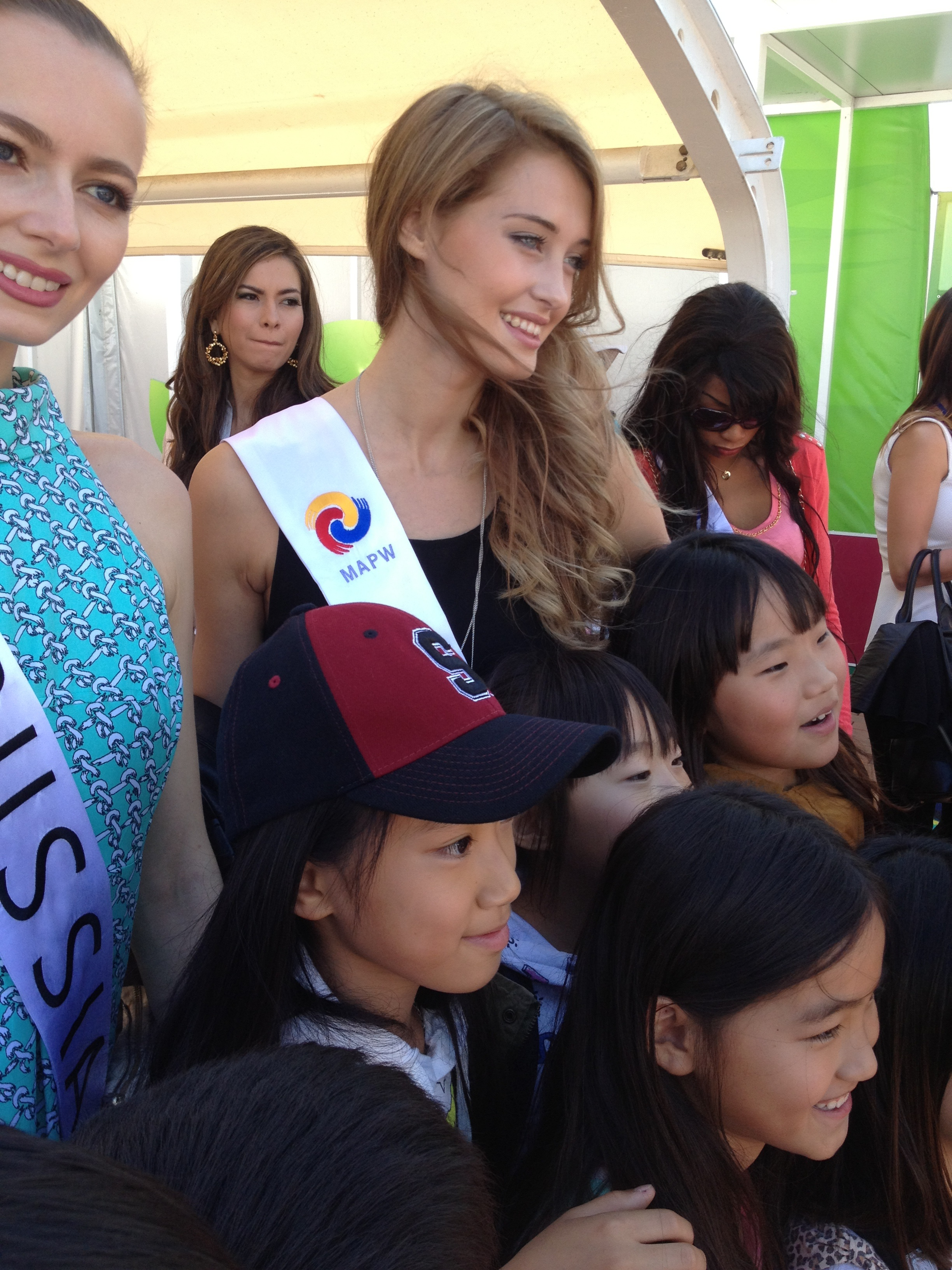
- Moa Madicken Öberg in Seoul in 2013
- Born: January 10, 1995 (age 31); Nässjö, Jönköping County, Sweden
- Occupations: Actress, Model
- Years active: 2012-present

Moa Madicken Öberg (born 10 January 1995) is a Swedish fashion model and beauty queen. She was a finalist and winner of Sweden Models and KA of Sweden Model Search in 2012. In October 2013, she traveled to Seoul, South Korea to represent her country as "Miss Sweden" at the Miss Asia Pacific World Super Talent 2013.

== Background ==
Moa Madicken Öberg hails from Nässjö, a small town in the Northern part of Småland, in southern Sweden.

== Career ==
Moa Madicken Öberg's first claim to notability arose in 2012 when she was featured in a national advertising campaign and TV commercial by the fashion house KA of Sweden. The campaign aired to millions of viewers in the Viasat-owned Modern Times Group's network; including TV8, TV6 and TV3. In September 2013, Moa Madicken Öberg was voted number 1 on an international ranking list over beauty queens. In October 2013, Moa Madicken Öberg represented Sweden at Miss Asia Pacific World Super Talent 2013 in South Korea, where she placed as 4th Runner-up. In addition to placing as 4th Runner-up, Moa won the "Best Body" prize in the Special Awards category.
