= Femina Miss India 2015 =

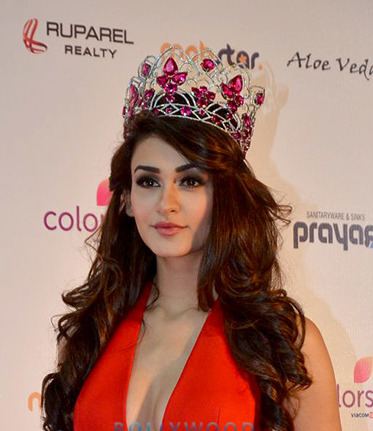
- Aditi Arya
- Date: March 28, 2015
- Presenters: Manish Paul, Neha Dhupia
- Entertainment: Jacqueline Fernandez, Shahid Kapoor, Kareena Kapoor, Sonu Nigam, Benny Dayal, Meet Brothers, Nindy Kaur,
- Venue: Yash Raj Studios, Mumbai, India
- Broadcaster: Colors (TV channel), Zoom (TV channel)
- Entrants: 21
- Winner: Aditi Arya, New Delhi
- Congeniality: Aafreen Vaz, Dunedin, New Zealand
- Best National Costume: Vartika Singh, Uttar Pradesh
- Photogenic: Vartika Singh, Uttar Pradesh
- Miss Internet: Rewati Chetri, Assam

The 52nd edition of the Femina Miss India beauty pageant finale was held at Yash Raj Films Studios, Mumbai on March 28, 2015. The pageant was telecast on Colors TV and Zoom (TV channel). Twenty-one contestants competed during the pageant. Koyal Rana crowned Aditi Arya as her successor, while Aafreen Vaz and Vartika Singh were crowned 1st and 2nd Runners Up respectively.

Aditi Arya represented India at Miss World 2015 held in China . Aafreen Vaz represented India at Miss Supranational 2015 held in Poland, where she placed in the Top 10 and was crowned Miss Supranational Asia and Oceania 2015.

== Results ==
=== Placements ===
Placement	Contestant
Femina Miss India World 2015	Aditi Arya
1st Runner-Up	Aafreen Rachel Vaz
2nd Runner-Up	Vartika Singh
Top 5	Deeksha Kaushal; Tanya Hope
Top 10	Naveli Deshmukh; Rakshita Harimurthy; Rewati Chetri §; Rushali Rai; Sushrii Shreya Mishraa

^§ Automatically qualified as a semifinalist, as the Winner of Miss Multimedia"

=== Appointments ===
Shortly after the coronation night, the remaining Runner-ups and finalist delegates were given the choice to represent the country in three international beauty pageants.

Title	Contestant	International Placement
Miss India Supranational 2015	Aafreen Rachel Vaz	Top 10 – Miss Supranational 2015
Miss Grand India 2015	Vartika Singh	2nd Runner-up – Miss Grand International 2015
Miss India United Continents 2015	Sushrii Shreya Mishraa	3rd Runner-up – Miss United Continents 2015

== Special awards ==
- Special Awards won by contestants.

Award	Contestant
Beauty with a purpose	Vartika Singh
WeChat Miss Popular	Rewati Chetri
Prayag Miss National Costume	Vartika Singh
INIFD Best Talented	Medhika Priya Singhal (Tie) Pranati Rai Prakash (Tie)
Switzerland Tourism Miss Photogenic	Vartika Singh
Cinnamon Miss Body Beautiful	Diksha Singh
fbb Miss Fashion Icon	Pranati Rai Prakash
Centro Miss Rampwalk	Sushrii Shreya Mishraa
Sofitel Miss Congeniality	Aafreen Vaz
Reliance Digital Miss Multimedia	Rewati Chetri
Richfeel Miss Beautiful Hair	Aditi Arya
Dazller Eterna Miss Beautiful Eyes	Aishwarya Goel
Smile Bar Miss Bright Smile	Minash Ravuthar
Olivia Miss Beautiful Legs	Pranati Rai Prakash
Neutrogena Miss Healthy Skin	Rakshitha Harimurthy
PCJ Miss Timeless Beauty	Deeksha Kaushal
Nutricharge Miss Active	Sushruthi Krishna
Times Miss Sudoku	Aditi Arya
Ruparel Reality Miss Lifestyle	Deeksha Kaushal
fbb Miss Vivacious	Sushrii Shreya Mishraa
Miss Water Baby	Meghna Mittal
Fujifilm Miss Selfie	Apeksha Porwal

=== Body Beautiful ===
Result	Contestant
Winner	Diksha Singh
Top 5	Meghna Mittal; Pranati Rai Prakash; Rushali Rai; Vartika Singh
Top 8	Aafreen Vaz; Aditi Arya; Akansha Gautam

=== National Costume ===
Result	Contestant
Winner	Vartika Singh
Top 6	Afreen Vaz; Diksha Singh; Minash Ravuthar; Pranati Rai Prakash; Sushruthi Krishna

=== Best Talent ===
Result	Contestant
Winner	Medhika Priya Singhal; Pranati Rai Prakash
Top 5	Aishwarya Goel; Sushrii Shreya Mishraa; Sushruthi Krishna

=== Miss Multimedia ===
Result	Contestant
Winner	Rewati Chetri
Top 5	Akanksha Gautam; Diksha Singh; Pranati Rai Prakash; Sushrii Shreya Mishraa

== Judges ==
=== Sub-Contest Judges ===
- Dino Morea - Gladrags Manhunt India 1995 and 1st Runner Up Manhunt International 1995, Model and Bollywood Actor.
- Gavin Miguel - Indian Designer
- Falguni Peacock - Indian Designer
- Shane Peacock - Indian Designer
- Vikram Bawa - Photographer

=== Final ===
- Shilpa Shetty - Actress
- Chitrangada Singh - Actress
- Sonali Bendre - Actress
- Manisha Koirala - Actress
- Sonu Nigam - Singer
- Abu Jani - Fashion designer
- Sandeep Khosla - Fashion designer
- Anil Kapoor - Actor
- John Abraham - Actor
- Firoz A. Nadiadwala - Producer

== Finalists ==
Contestant	Age	Height	City
Aafreen Vaz	24	1.81 m (5 ft 11 1/2 in)	Dunedin, New Zealand
Aditi Arya	22	1.80 m (5 ft 11 in)	Gurgaon
Aishwarya Goel	20	1.75 m (5 ft 9 in)	Dehradun
Akanksha Gautam	23	1.70 m (5 ft 7 in)	Bangalore
Apeksha Porwal	22	1.73 m (5 ft 8 in)	Mumbai
Chahat Dalal	22	1.70 m (5 ft 7 in)	Pune
Deeksha Kaushal	24	1.80 m (5 ft 11 in)	New Delhi
Diksha Singh	18	1.73 m (5 ft 8 in)	Goa
Medhika Priya	22	1.73 m (5 ft 8 in)	Dehradun
Meghna Mittal	19	1.72 m (5 ft 7 1/2 in)	Pune
Minash Ravuthar	22	1.75 m (5 ft 9 in)	Mumbai
Naveli Deshmukh	18	1.73 m (5 ft 8 in)	Aurangabad
Pranati Rai Prakash	20	1.73 m (5 ft 8 in)	Patna
Rakshitha Harimurthy	18	1.70 m (5 ft 7 in)	Bangalore
Rewati Chetri	20	1.80 m (5 ft 11 in)	Assam
Ruchira Mookerji	20	1.70 m (5 ft 7 in)	Kolkata
Rushali Rai	19	1.70 m (5 ft 7 in)	New Delhi
Sushrii Shreya Mishraa	24	1.75 m (5 ft 9 in)	Sambalpur
Sushruthi Krishna	21	1.70 m (5 ft 7 in)	Bangalore
Tanya Hope	21	1.75 m (5 ft 9 in)	Kolkata
Vartika Singh	22	1.73 m (5 ft 8 in)	Lucknow

== Crossovers ==
Contestants who previously competed in other national and international beauty pageants with their respective placements:

=== National Pageants ===
==== Femina Miss India ====
- Femina Miss India 2016: Sushruthi Krishna (1st Runner-up)
- Femina Miss India 2020: Aishwarya Goel (Top 15)

===== State Finalists =====
- FMI 2020 Uttarakhand: Aishwarya Goel (Winner)

==== Miss Universe India ====
- 2010: Sushrii Shreya Mishraa (Top 30)
- 2013: Sushrii Shreya Mishraa (Top 7)
- 2014: Chahat Dalal (Top 14)
- 2014: Minash Ravutar (Top 14)
- 2015: Naveli Deshmukh (2nd Runner-up)
- 2017: Apeksha Porwal (Runner-up)
- 2014: Vartika Singh (Top 7)
- 2019: Vartika Singh (Winner)
- 2021: Naveli Deshmukh (Top 20)

==== Miss International India ====
- 2016: Rewati Chetri (Winner)

==== Miss India Worldwide India ====
- 2015: Apeksha Porwal (Winner)

==== India's Next Top Model ====
- Season 1: Rushali Rai (1st Runner-up)
- Season 2: Pranati Prakash Rai (Winner)

=== International Pageants ===
Miss Asian Supermodel 2010

- 2010: Sushrii Shreya Mishraa (Winner)

Miss India Worldwide 2015

- 2015: Apeksha Porwal (1st Runner-up)

Miss International 2016

- 2016: Rewati Chetri (Unplaced)

World Miss University 2016

- 2016: Rewati Chetri (Top 6)

Miss Universe 2019

- 2019: Vartika Singh (Top 20)

Mrs Galaxy 2023

- 2023 : Chahat Dalal (Winner)
