= Femina Miss India 2016 =

- Date: April 9, 2016
- Presenters: Karan Johar, Manish Paul, Shahrukh khan, Shahid Kapoor performance Act choreographed by inder sharma a bollywood dance choreographer
- Entertainment: Tiger Shroff, Varun Dhawan
- Venue: Yash Raj Studios, Mumbai, India
- Broadcaster: Colors (TV channel), Zoom (Indian TV channel)
- Entrants: 21
- Congeniality: Natasha Singh; Bilaspur
- Best National Costume: Roshmitha Harimurthy; Bangalore
- Photogenic: Sushruthi krishna Bangalore
- Beauty with a purpose: Sushruthi Krishna

The 53rd edition of the Femina Miss India beauty pageant was held on 9 April 2016 in Mumbai. Twenty-one contestants competed for the titles of Femina Miss India 2016. Aditi Arya crowned Priyadarshini Chatterjee as her successor. She represented India at Miss World 2016, Sushruthi Krishna was crowned as the 1st Runner Up by Aafreen Vaz, and Pankhuri Gidwani was crowned as the 2nd Runner Up by Vartika Singh.

Priyadarshini Chatterjee who won Femina Miss India World 2016 represented India at Miss World 2016 held in USA and placed in the top 20. Pankhuri Gidwani who won Femina Miss India 2nd Runner Up 2016 was designated Miss Grand India 2016 and represented India at Miss Grand International 2016 held in USA.

After the Femina Miss India 2016 pageant, Lopamudra Raut who was not a contestant at Femina Miss India 2016, but had been a contestant in the 2013 and 2014 editions, was later designated by Femina as India's representative at Miss United Continents 2016 held in Ecuador where she placed as 2nd Runner Up.

== Final results ==
Color keys

- The contestant Won in an International pageant.
- The contestant was a Runner-up in an International pageant.
- The contestant was a Semi-Finalist in an International pageant.
- Unplaced

Placement	Contestant	International placement
Miss India 2016	Priyadarshini Chatterjee	Top 20
Miss India Grand International 2016	Pankhuri Gidwani	Unplaced
Miss India United Continents 2016	Lopamudra Raut *	2nd Runner-up
1st Runner-up	Sushruthi Krishna	
Top 5	Roshmitha Harimurthy; Navpreet Kaur	
Top 10	Dnyanda Shringarpure; Natasha Singh; Gayathri Reddy; Vaishnavi Patwardhan; Aradhana Buragohain	

*: Although Lopamudra Raut was not a contestant in Femina Miss India 2016, she was later appointed by Femina as the representative of India in Miss United Continents 2016.

== Contestants ==
Contestant	Age	Height	City
Adya Niraj	18	1.70 m (5 ft 7 in)	Ranchi
Aishwarya Sheoran	19	1.86 m (6 ft 1 in)	New Delhi
Akshita Yadav	21	1.69 m (5 ft 6 1/2 in)	New Delhi
Aneesha Nitin Rane	18	1.69 m (5 ft 6 1/2 in)	Kannur
Aradhana Buragohain	24	1.73 m (5 ft 8 in)	Dibrugarh
Dimple Paul	25	1.70 m (5 ft 7 in)	Mumbai
Dnyanda Shringarpure	17	1.73 m (5 ft 8 in)	Pune
Gayathri Reddy	20	1.68 m (5 ft 6 in)	Chennai
Natasha Singh	23	1.70 m (5 ft 7 in)	Bilaspur, HP
Navpreet Kaur	18	1.72 m (5 ft 7 1/2 in)	Adampur
Nazneen Shaik	20	1.73 m (5 ft 8 in)	Surat
Niharika Anand	22	1.71 m (5 ft 7 1/2 in)	New Delhi
Pankhuri Gidwani	18	1.76 m (5 ft 9 1/2 in)	Lucknow
Priyadarshini Chatterjee	19	1.72 m (5 ft 7 1/2 in)	Dhubri
Priyanka Singh	24	1.78 m (5 ft 10 in)	Jaipur
Rajkanya Baruah	23	1.68 m (5 ft 6 in)	Guwahati
Roshmitha Harimurthy	21	1.74 m (5 ft 8 1/2 in)	Bangalore
Sanjana GL	22	1.73 m (5 ft 8 in)	Bangalore
Sushruthi Krishna	22	1.69 m (5 ft 6 1/2 in)	Bangalore
Vaishnavi Patwardhan	21	1.73 m (5 ft 8 in)	Pune
Zeba Baig	23	1.69 m (5 ft 6 1/2 in)	Indore

== Judging panel ==
- Amy Jackson
- Kabir Khan
- Yami Gautam
- Arjun Kapoor
- Ekta Kapoor
- Sanjay Dutt
- Sania Mirza
- Manish Malhotra
- Mireia Lalaguna - Miss World 2015 from Spain
- Shane Peacock

== Presenters ==
- Manish Paul - Host
- Karan Johar - Host
- Shahrukh Khan - Final Results
- Shahid Kapoor
- Varun Dhawan - Introducing Top 5

== City pageant winners ==
- Winners of the City Pageants will get a direct entry to fbb Femina Miss India 2016.

=== Femina Miss India Bangalore ===
- Femina Miss India Bangalore 2016 winners

Winner	1st Runner Up	2nd Runner Up
Roshmitha Harimurthy	Elizabeth Thadikaran	Sanjana GL

=== Femina Miss India Kolkata ===
- Femina Miss India Kolkata 2016 winners

Winner	1st Runner Up	2nd Runner Up
Rajkanya Baruah	Sushmita Roy	Adya Niraj

=== Femina Miss India Delhi ===
- Femina Miss India Delhi 2016 winners

Winner	1st Runner Up	2nd Runner Up
Priyadarshini Chatterjee	Natasha Singh	Rinki Ghildiyal
