= Femina Miss India Delhi 2013 =

Femina Miss India Delhi is a beauty pageant in India that annually selects three winners to compete nationally . The winner of Femina Miss India Delhi vies in Miss India. It is organized by Femina, a women's magazine published by Bennett, Coleman & Co. Ltd.

== Final results ==
Result	Contestant
Femina Miss India Delhi 2013	Anukriti Gusain
1st runner-up	Vijaya Sharma
2nd runner-up	Srishti Rana
Semifinalist	Agrima Wadhawan; Akanksha Rachel Saini; Karina Ahuja; Ravneet Kaur; Rosy Phogat; Shivani Sharma; Swati Ale; Shruti Srivastava; Swati Kain; Yashna Khurana; Yoshiki Sindhar

=== Sub Contest Awards ===
Award	Contestant
Miss Adventurous	Yoshiki Sindhar
Miss Body Beautiful	Karina Ahuja
Miss Congeniality	Shivani Sharma
Miss Eeye-Conic Eyes	Swati Kain
Miss Fashion Icon	Vijaya Sharma & Swati Kain
Miss Glowing Skin	Anukriti Gusain
Miss Intellectual	Yoshiki Sindhar
Miss Stylish Hair	Swati Kain
Miss Timeless Beauty	Anukriti Gusain

=== Judges ===
- Simran Kaur Mundi: Femina Miss India Universe 2008
- Vanya Mishra: Femina Miss India World 2012
- Khushwant Singh
- Pooja Talwar
