= Roshmitha Harimurthy =

Indian model (born 1994)

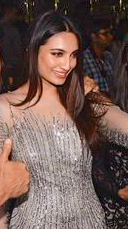
- Harimurthy in 2017
- Born: 13 August 1994 (age 32); Bengaluru, Karnataka, India
- Education: Master's degree in international business
- Alma mater: Mount Carmel College, Bangalore
- Beauty pageant titleholder
- Title: Miss Universe India 2016
- Hair color: Dark brown
- Eye color: Dark brown]
- Major competitions: Femina Miss India Bangalore 2016 (Winner); Femina Miss India 2016 (Top 5); Miss Diva - 2016 (Winner - Miss Universe INDIA 2016); Miss Universe 2016 (Unplaced)

Roshmitha Harimurthy (born 13 August 1994) is an Indian model and beauty pageant titleholder who was crowned as Miss Universe India 2016 at Sardar Vallabhbhai Patel Indoor Stadium, Mumbai. As winner of Miss Diva - 2016, she represented India at Miss Universe 2016 in Manila, Philippines.

== Early life ==
Harimurthy was born and raised in Bengaluru. She belongs to Kannadiga family. Her sister, Rakshita Harimurthy is also a beauty pageant titleholder. She did her schooling from Sophia High School, Bengaluru and later finished her master's degree in international business from Mount Carmel College, Bangalore.

== Pageantry ==
Harimurthy auditioned for the title Femina Miss India Bangalore, where she was winner and got a direct entry to Femina Miss India 2016 as finalist. On final night, she reached the top 5 finalist and win the special awards "Miss Spectacular Eyes" and "Miss Rampwalk" in the event.

=== Miss Diva - 2016 ===
Still the same year, she participated in Miss Diva - 2016 contest and won the title of Miss Diva Universe 2016 where she was crowned by outgoing titleholder Urvashi Rautela.

=== Miss Universe 2016 ===
She represented India at Miss Universe 2016 which was held at Mall of Asia Arena, Pasay, Metro Manila, Philippines on 29 January 2017 and was unplaced.

Awards and achievements
Preceded by Urvashi Rautela	Miss Diva Universe; 2016	Succeeded by Shraddha Shashidhar
