= Anukriti Gusain =

Indian model, and television host (born 1994)

Anukriti Gusain Rawat
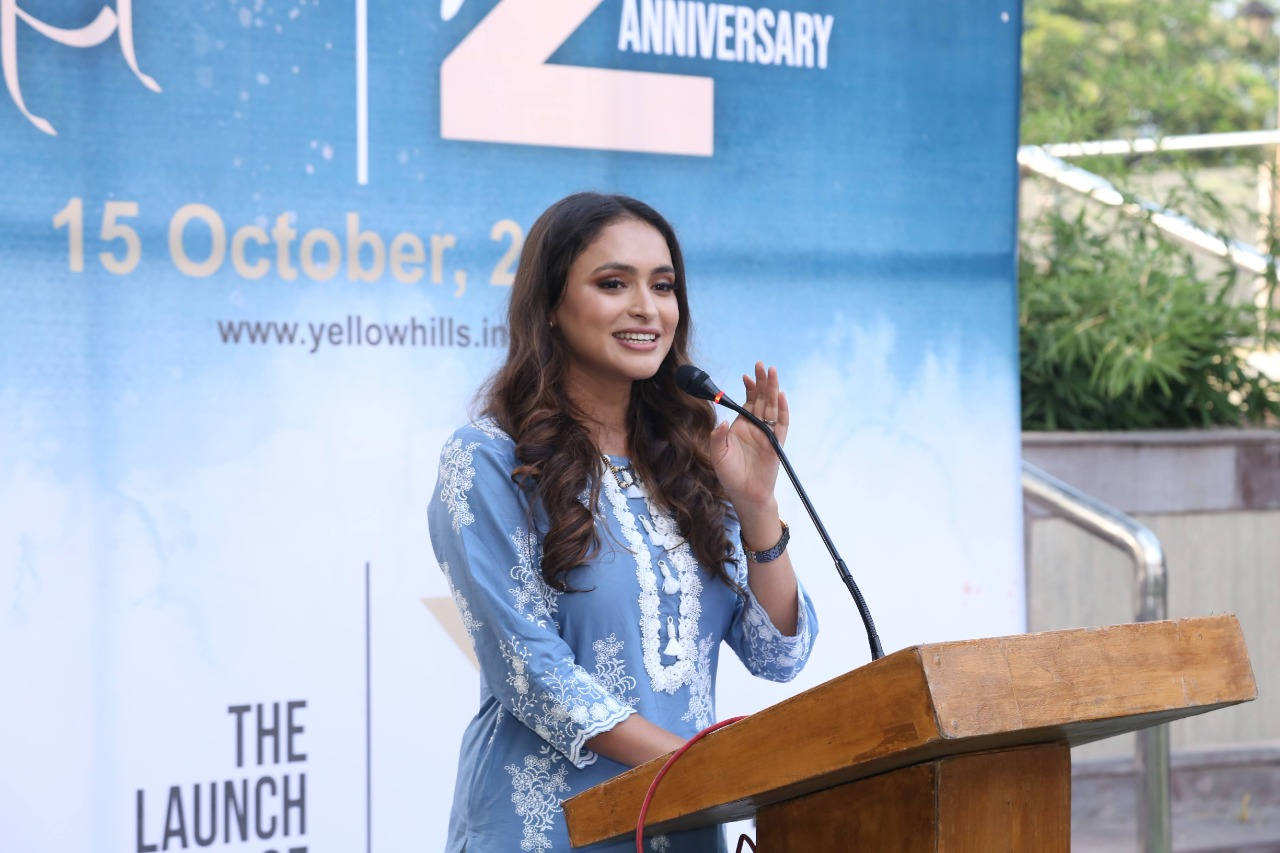
- Gusain in 2020
- Born: 25 March 1994 (age 32); Lansdowne, Uttarakhand, India
- Occupations: Politician, Social activist, model, television host and presenter
- Political party: Bharatiya Janata Party
- Spouse: Tushit Rawat
- Beauty pageant titleholder
- Title: Bride of the World India 2013; Femina Miss India Delhi 2013; Femina Miss India Asia World 2014; Femina Miss India Uttarakhand 2017; Femina Miss Grand India 2017
- Hair color: Black
- Eye color: Brown
- Major competitions: Femina Miss India 2013 (Top 5); Miss Asia Pacific World 2014 (4th Runner-up); Femina Miss India 2017 (Top 6); Miss Grand International 2017 (Top 20)

Anukriti Gusain (born 25 March 1994) is an Indian politician and social activist from Uttarakhand, affiliated with the Bharatiya Janata Party (BJP). She has been actively involved in politics, focusing on social welfare and community development in her home state. Initially contesting the Uttarakhand Legislative Assembly elections as a candidate of the Indian National Congress (INC), she later joined the BJP in April 2024, aligning with the party's vision for regional progress. Beyond her political engagements, Anukriti serves as the President of the Mahila Utthan Evam Bal Kalyan Sansthan, an NGO dedicated to women's empowerment and child welfare, through which she has implemented various skill development programs across Uttarakhand.

She won the title of Femina Miss India Grand International 2017 at Femina Miss India 2017 pageant. She was previously crowned Miss India Asia Pacific World 2014 and represented India at Miss Asia Pacific World 2014. She made a comeback to pageantry in 2017, when she won Femina Miss India Uttarakhand 2017 and represented India in Miss Grand international in Vietnam.

== Early life ==
Anukriti was born in Lansdowne of Pauri Garhwal district in north Indian state of Uttarakhand.

== Career ==
- Executive Director Doon Institute of medical sciences Dehradun 2018 Present. 3 yrs
- Joint CEO Ingreen nature's herb private limited 2018 Present • 3 yrs
- President Mahila Utthan Evam Bal Kalyan Sansthan (NGO) 2018 Present • 3 yrs
- Software Developer Cognizant (2017)
- Bennett Coleman and Co. Ltd. (Times Group) 1 yr 10 months.
- Miss Asia Pacific World India 2014
- Miss Grand International 2017

=== Femina Miss India ===
Femina Miss India Delhi 2013 was a regional pageant for participation Internationally. She won Femina Miss India Delhi 2013. She won two sub titles there including Femina Miss Timeless Beauty and Femina Miss Glowing Skin.

Gusain was one of the top five finalist of Femina Miss India 2013, which was held in Mumbai on 24 March 2013. Gusain has also titled with Miss Beautiful Smile and Miss Photogenic in Sub Contest Awards of Miss India 2013. Gusain is winner of Pond's Femina Miss India Delhi 2013, there were 14 finalists in the last round of Pond's Femina Miss India Delhi 2013. In addition to winning the competition, she also won PCJ Femina Miss Timeless Beauty and Pond's Femina Miss Glowing skin.

=== Miss Supertalent of the World ===
She was crowned Femina Miss India 2014 and represented India at Miss Supertalent of the World 2014 held at Grand Hilton Hotels in Seoul, Korea and was crowned the 4th Runner up. Gusain wore gold gowns, a cocktail sari and a bodysuit for the main event designed by Raakesh Agarvwal.

=== Miss Grand International 2017 ===
Anukriti represented India at Miss Grand International 2017. She was considered as one of the top contenders for the pageant. Being consistent in all the activities, she won people's hearts. She was able to earn a spot in top 20 at the pageant which was held in Vietnam on 25 September 2017, but was not able to go further. Apart from this, she was a top 10 for best in national costume and swimsuit competition.

== Awards ==
- She is awarded, Mahatma Gandhi Samman 2014 for representing India in international beauty pageant.
- Award from Uttarakhand Film Association to felicitated for her contribution in respective creative field.

== Social work ==
- Her NGO is running several skill training centre to skill the women of Uttarakhand. The centre provide free skill training and entrepreneurship opportunities in various fields like food processing, general duty assistant, COVID CARE Frontline Workers, agriculture, mason tiling, floriculture, hospitality, etc. and has employed several people through these schemes.

== Politics ==
She contested 2022 Uttarakhand Assembly elections on the ticket of Congress from Lansdowne constituency. She received a total of 14636 votes. She was defeated by Bhartiya Janta Party candidate Daleep Singh Rawat. Daleep received total 24504 votes. She joined the Bharatiya Janata Party in 2024.

== TV shows ==
Year	Show name	Role	Channel
2015	Planet Bollywood News	Host	Zoom TV

Awards and achievements
Preceded by Srishti Rana	Miss India Asia Pacific World; 2014	Succeeded by Swetha Raj
Preceded by (Sweden) Moa Madicken Öberg	Miss Asia Pacific World; 4th runner up 2014	Succeeded by Swetha Raj
Preceded by First Winner	Femina Bride of India; 2013	Succeeded by TBA
Preceded by First Winner	Femina Miss India Delhi; 2013	Succeeded by Koyal Rana
