= Aditi Arya =

Indian model

Aditi Arya Kotak
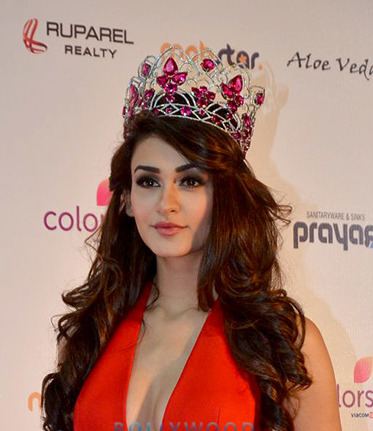
- Arya at Femina Miss India 2015
- Born: 18 September 1993 (age 33); Chandigarh, India
- Education: Yale University, MBA; Delhi University, BBS
- Occupation: Actress
- Spouse: Jay Kotak (m. 2023)
- Beauty pageant titleholder
- Title: Femina Miss India World 2015
- Major competitions: Femina Miss India 2015 (Winner) (Miss Beautiful Hair) (Miss Sudoku); Femina Miss India Delhi 2015; Miss World 2015 (unplaced)

Aditi Arya Kotak (born 18 September 1993) is an Indian actress, model, research analyst and beauty pageant titleholder who was crowned Femina Miss India World in 2015. She represented India at Miss World 2015 pageant.

== Early life ==
Arya was born in Chandigarh and studied at Sacred Heart Senior Secondary School in her early years before moving to Gurgaon where she completed her schooling at Amity International School. She then completed her graduation with a finance major in business studies from Shaheed Sukhdev College of Business Studies. She was enrolled in the Indian School of Business through their Young Leaders Programme while working as a research analyst for one of the big four audit firms, Ernst & Young.

She is enrolled in the Yale School of Management, MBA class of 2023.

She has been associated with several non-profit groups such as Amitasha, Supported Decision Making and Protsahan.

== Pageantry ==
=== Femina Miss India 2015 ===
Arya was crowned the winner at Femina Miss India World 2015, on 28 March 2015 in Mumbai.

=== Miss World 2015 ===
After winning the title of Femina Miss India World 2015 represented India at Miss World 2015, the 65th edition of the Miss World pageant. She was amongst the top 5 in Multimedia award, top 5 in People's choice award, top 10 in World Fashion Designer Dress award, top 25 in Beauty With a Purpose award, top 30 in the talent sub-competition and top 30 in the Top Model sub-competition.

== Acting career ==
After passing on the crown of Femina Miss India 2015, Arya has made her Tollywood debut as the lead heroine in Director, Puri Jagannadh's film with Nandamuri Kalyan Ram titled Ism. The film was a box office success and was well received by audience and critics alike.

She then made her Kannada debut as Uttara in the magnum opus Kurukshetra, which is being shot in 3D.

She has played the lead role in the 36 episode Hindi web series Tantra directed by Sidhant Sachdev and produced by Vikram Bhatt. She has also done another web series Spotlight 2 with the same team, to be released on 26 January on the International over-the-top video service Viu.

She is currently shooting for her next Tollywood film Ninnu Vadili Nenu Polenule.

Arya's Punjabi film Teriyan Meriyan Hera Pheriyan was released on 21st June 2024.

== Personal life ==
In November 2023, she married Jay Kotak, the son of billionaire Uday Kotak in an extravagant affair with ceremonies conducted at Taj Fateh Prakash Palace Udaipur and Jio World Convention Centre Mumbai.

== Filmography ==
=== Film ===
Year	Film	Role	Language	Notes
2016	Ism	Alia Khan	Telugu	Telugu debut
2017	Tantra	Sunaina	Hindi	Web series released on Voot
2018	Spotlight 2	Jyotika	Hindi	Web series released on Viu
2019	Seven	Abhinaya	Telugu / Tamil	Tamil debut
2019	Kurukshetra	Uttarā	Kannada	Kannada debut
2020	Unlock	Riddhi	Hindi	Film released on ZEE5
2021	83	Inderjit Bhardwaj	Hindi	
2024	Teriyaan Meriyaan Hera Pheriyan		Punjabi	Punjabi debut

Awards and achievements
Preceded by Sashi Bhangari	Femina Miss India Delhi; 1st Runner Up; 2015	Succeeded by Natasha Singh
Preceded by (India) Koyal Rana	Femina Miss India World; 2015	Succeeded by Priyadarshini Chatterjee
