= Miss Diva 2016 =

4th edition of Miss Diva

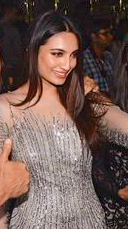
- Roshmitha Harimurthy
- Date: September 1, 2016
- Presenters: Vir Das, Lara Dutta
- Venue: Sardar Vallabhbhai Patel Indoor Stadium, Mumbai, India
- Broadcaster: Colors Infinity
- Entrants: 15
- Placements: 6
- Winner: • Roshmitha Harimurthy • Srinidhi Ramesh Shetty
- Congeniality: Aayushi Arora
- Photogenic: Srinidhi Ramesh Shetty

The 4th edition of Miss Diva took place in 2016. 16 contestants competed in the pageant. Miss Diva 2016 featured a television reality series which was telecast on Colors Infinity. The 16 contestants, who were mentored by former Femina Miss India Universe 2000 and Miss Universe 2000 Lara Dutta through the series, were based in a "Diva Villa" at Madh Island and judged based on their performances by celebrity judges.

At the finale held on September 1, 2016, Roshmitha Harimurthy won the pageant and was crowned Miss Diva India Universe 2016 by the previous winner Urvashi Rautela, Srinidhi Shetty was crowned Miss Diva Supranational 2016 by Natasha Assadi and Stephania Stegman and Aradhana Buragohain was crowned Miss Diva Runner Up 2016 by Naveli Deshmukh.

Roshmitha Harimurthy represented India at the Miss Universe 2016 pageant held in the Philippines where she is unplaced. Srinidhi Shetty, representing India, was crowned Miss Supranational 2016 on December 2, 2016 in Poland.

== Placements ==
Final results	Contestant
Miss Planet 2017	Philippines – Charmaine Elima
1st Runner Up	Japan – Ayaka Koshiba
2nd Runner Up	India – Aradhana Buragohain
3rd Runner Up	France – Lena Stachurski
4th Runner Up	Indonesia – Ivhanrel Eltrisna Sumerah
Top 12	Brazil – Gabrielle Vilela; Hungary – Marta Molnar; Jamaica – Solange Sinclair; Mauritius – Ambika Callychurn; New Zealand – Deborah Lambie; South Africa – Priyeshka Lutchman; Vietnam – Nguyen Thi Thanh
Top 24	Bahamas – Candisha Rolle; Canada – Kesiah Papasin; Czech Republic – Petra Kaprhalova; Egypt – Kholoud Ezra; Guatemala – Maria Jose Larranaga; Iceland – Hildur Maria; Nigeria – Susan Adeyeni; Pakistan – Anzhelika Tahir; Slovakia – Lenka Tekeljakova; Spain – Carla Font; Thailand – Paweensuda Drouin; Ukraine – Natalia Varchenko

== Contestants ==
Name	Age	Height	From	Placement	Notes
Aayushi Arora	20 (Born: 1996)	1.75 m (5 ft 9 in)	Chandigarh		
Heena Bhalla	26 (Born: 1990)	1.73 m (5 ft 8 in)	Delhi		
Natasha Bharadwaj	18 (Born: 1998)	1.70 m (5 ft 7 in)	Mumbai, Maharashtra		
Alankrita Bora	18 (Born: 1998)	1.68 m (5 ft 6 in)	Guwahati, Assam		
Aradhana Buragohain	24 (Born: 1992)	1.73 m (5 ft 8 in)	Dibrugarh, Assam	Runner Up	Top 10, Femina Miss India 2016
Richa Chaturvedi	22 (Born: 1994)	1.70 m (5 ft 7 in)	Delhi		
Muskan Deria	23 (Born: 1993)	1.80 m (5 ft 11 in)	Indore, Madhya Pradesh		
Roshmitha Harimurthy	22 (Born: 1994)	1.74 m (5 ft 8 1/2 in)	Bengaluru, Karnataka	Miss Diva India Universe	Top 5, Femina Miss India 2016
Avantika Masand	18 (Born: 1998)	1.76 m (5 ft 9 1/2 in)	Noida, Uttar Pradesh		
Monisha Ramesh	23 (Born: 1993)	1.70 m (5 ft 7 in)	Bengaluru, Karnataka		
Ishita Sachdeva	18 (Born: 1998)	1.73 m (5 ft 8 in)	Delhi		
Tanishq Sharma	24 (Born: 1992)	1.68 m (5 ft 6 in)	Oman		
Srinidhi Shetty	24 (Born: 1992)	1.73 m (5 ft 8 in)	Mangaluru, Karnataka	Miss Diva Supranational India	Miss Supranational 2016
Sophiya Singh	22 (Born: 1994)	1.68 m (5 ft 6 in)	Noida, Uttar Pradesh		
Sakshma Srivastav	18 (Born: 1998)	1.75 m (5 ft 9 in)	Mumbai, Maharashtra		
Srishti Vyakaranam	24 (Born: 1992)	1.75 m (5 ft 9 in)	Hyderabad		

== Crossovers ==
Femina Miss India

- 2016: Roshmitha Harimurthy (Top 5)
- 2016: Aradhana Buragohain (Top 10)
