= Priyadarshini Chatterjee =

Indian model, Miss India 2016

- Born: 5 September 1996 (age 30); Dhubri, Assam, India
- Occupation: Model
- Height: 1.72 m (5 ft 8 in)
- Beauty pageant titleholder
- Title: Femina Miss India Delhi 2016; Femina Miss India 2016
- Major competitions: Femina Miss India 2016; (Winner); Miss World 2016; (Top 20)

Priyadarshini Chatterjee (Bengali: প্রিয়দর্শিনী চ্যাটার্জি, Bengali pronunciation: [prijodorʃini tʃæʈaɾdʒi]; born 5 September 1996) is an Indian model and beauty pageant titleholder who was crowned Femina Miss India in 2016.

She represented India at the Miss World 2016 pageant. She is the first northeast Indian to represent India at Miss World. She made it to the top 20 (semi-finalist) and also top-5 in Beauty with a Purpose.

== Early life ==
She was born in Dhubri in a Bengali family and was brought up in Guwahati city in the state of Assam. She completed her schooling in Maria's Public School in Guwahati and moved to New Delhi to pursue higher studies. She is currently pursuing her bachelor's degree from Hindu College, University of Delhi.

== Modeling and pageantry ==
While pursuing education in New Delhi, she started a career in modeling. She has done many modeling assignments by working as a freelance model. In 2016 she won the title of Femina Miss Delhi, which gave her a direct entry to participate in Femina Miss India 2016, where she won the title of Femina Miss India World 2016. During her reign as Miss India, she was hospitalized because of anemia.

== See also ==
- Aditi Arya - Femina Miss World India 2015.
- Koyal Rana - Femina Miss World India 2014. Winner of "Miss World Asia and Oceania"
- Femina Miss India

Awards and achievements
Preceded by Apeksha Porwal	Femina Miss Delhi; 2016	Succeeded by Maira Chowdhury
Preceded by Sushrii Shreya Mishraa	Miss Rampwalk; 2016	Succeeded by Priyanka Kumari
Preceded by Aditi Arya	Femina Miss India; 2016	Succeeded by Manushi Chhillar
