= Femina Miss India 2020 =

Indian beauty pageant

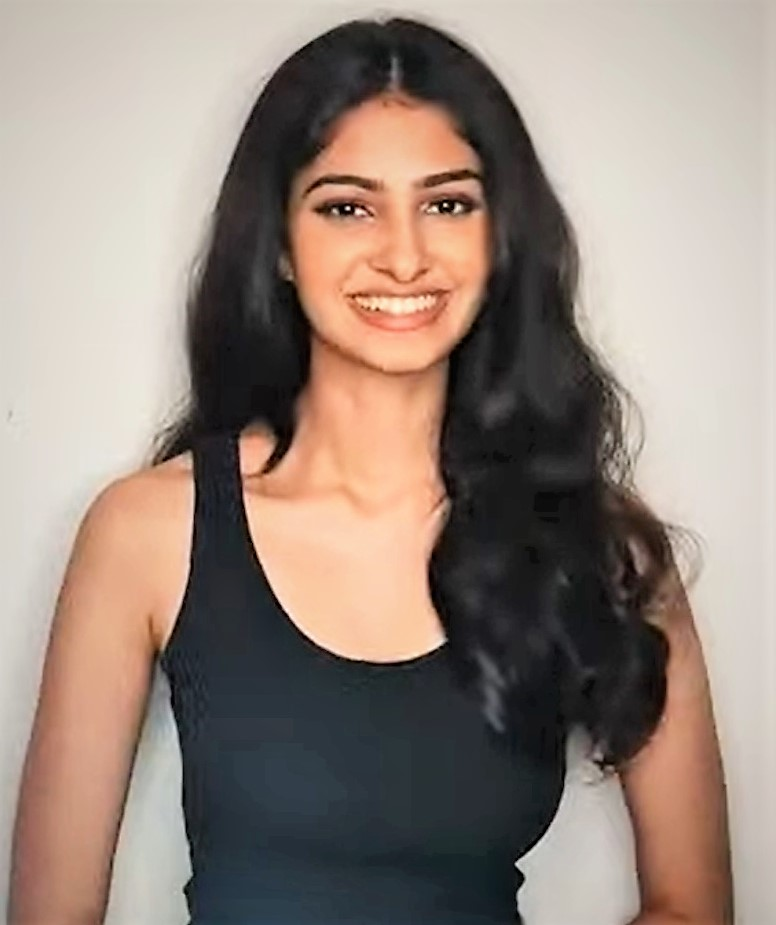
- Manasa Varanasi
- Date: 10 February 2021
- Presenters: Aparshakti Khurana
- Entertainment: Vaani Kapoor
- Venue: Hyatt Regency Hotel, Mumbai
- Broadcaster: Colors TV
- Entrants: 31
- Placements: 15
- Winner: Manasa Varanasi; Telangana
- Photogenic: Manika Sheokand; Haryana

Femina Miss India 2020 was the 57th edition of the Femina Miss India beauty pageant. Due to the COVID-19 pandemic, the entire Femina Miss India contest was held digitally for the first time in the contest's history. The competition was divided into four stages, with the grand finale taking place on 10 February 2021 at the Hyatt Regency Hotel in Mumbai.

Suman Rao of Rajasthan crowned Manasa Varanasi of Telangana as the winner, earning the right to represent India at Miss World 2021.

Shivani Jadhav of Chhattisgarh crowned Manika Sheokand of Haryana as her successor. She will represent India at Miss Grand International 2021.

Runner-up was Femina Miss India Uttar Pradesh, Manya Singh. She graduated from Mumbai's Thakur College of Science and Commerce. The success story of this Mumbai rickshaw driver's daughter has been widely publicised in Indian media.

== Results ==
=== Placements ===
For regional group:	For international placement:
E East Zone	The contestant won in an international pageant.
NE North East Zone	The contestant was a runner-up in an international pageant.
N North Zone	The contestant was a semi-finalist in an international pageant.
S South Zone	Unplaced
W West Zone

Placement	Contestant	International Placement
Femina Miss India World 2020	S Telangana – Manasa Varanasi	Top 13
Femina Miss India Grand International 2021	N Haryana – Manika Sheokand	Top 20
Runner Up	N Uttar Pradesh – Manya Singh	
Top 5	W Gujarat – Khushi Misra; S Karnataka – Rati Hulji	
Top 15	E Chhattisgarh – Angela Kumar; E Jharkhand – Rupali Bhushan; S Kerala – Leena Lal; W Maharashtra – Angelika Sawhney; NE Nagaland – Zuchobeni Tüngoe; N New Delhi – Supriya Dahiya; N Punjab – Karuna Singh; W Rajasthan – Aruna Beniwal (Note: Rajasthan — Aruna Beniwal was appointed to compete at Femina Miss India 2020 by the Femina Miss India organisation, as a replacement to Raina Garg, Femina Miss India Tamil Nadu 2020 due to unforeseen circumstances. Raina Garg was among the Top 15 finalists of the Femina Miss India 2020.); N Uttarakhand – Aishwarya Goel; E West Bengal – Mouli Haldar	

== Sub Title Awards ==
Award	Contestant
Beauty with a Purpose	Punjab - Karuna Singh
Miss Glamorous Look	Mizoram - Lalmuansangi Varte
Miss Rampwalk	Telangana - Manasa Varanasi
Miss Beautiful Smile	Rajasthan - Aruna Beniwal
Miss Lifestyle	Tamil Nadu - Raina Garg
Miss Fit and Fabulous	Gujarat - Khushi Misra
Miss Sudoku	Goa - Trisha Shetty
Miss Fashion Icon	Nagaland - Zuchobeni Tüngoe
Miss Shining Star	Punjab - Karuna Singh
Miss Photogenic	Haryana - Manika Sheokand
Miss Intelligence Quotient	Uttarakhand - Aishwarya Goel
Miss Body Beautiful	Rajasthan - Aruna Beniwal
Miss Beautiful Skin	Jharkhand - Rupali Bhushan
Miss Holistic Health	Chhattisgarh - Angela Kumar

== Format ==
The registration form was published on the organization's official website on 5 October 2020 and remained open until 2 November 2020. The format was updated to include more reduced height criteria (5 ft 3 in). Shortlisted were 31 finalists, 28 of whom were state representatives, one each from Delhi and Jammu and Kashmir, and a collective representative from the remaining union territories. The contest's progress was scheduled to be completed in four stages, with the grand finale taking place in February 2021.

=== The Four Phases ===
Due to COVID-19 restrictions, the selection and first phase (October & November) of the finals were entirely digital. Applicants for this year's competition went through an online selection process in which they were judged on four key parameters: appearance, personality, talent, interview, and walk down the ramp. A panel judged each candidate, and the entries were narrowed down to groups of finalists for each state.

A series of online interviews were conducted in the second phase of the contest (November) to select 31 state winners who would form the final pool of contestants for Femina Miss India 2020.

The third phase of the contest, which involved the 31 state finalists, was held online (December 2020 & January 2021). State winners were trained in a holistic curriculum from the comfort of their homes, consisting of classes and interactive sessions facilitated by industry experts on topics ranging from skincare to self-expression, from style from the changing room to the ramp. State winners also received training in content creation and social media management, in addition to presentation and grooming. This training would allow the finalists to document their experiences during both preparation and competition, and it was shared via social media and live streaming sessions, allowing fans to participate in the experience of becoming Miss India like never before.

The 31 finalists were then reduced to a Top 15 list. The selected ladies advanced to the final round of the competition in Mumbai, which was held in the traditional format. The fewer contests were held to ensure proper social distancing protocols.

The pageant's final phase (2020), the Grand Finale, was produced and broadcast as a prerecorded television show featuring artist performances, sponsor integrations, and contestant rounds, culminating in the announcement of the Top 3.

=== Mentor ===
The contest was mentored by Bollywood film actress and Femina Miss India 2002, Neha Dhupia. She coached the contestants through the rounds of the competition as a mentor, assisting them with overall development on their journey to becoming a beauty queen. Dhupia also announced the 31 finalists from the top five states from each zone, namely North, North East, South, East, West, and Union territory with Delhi.

=== Judges ===
- Neha Dhupia - Femina Miss India 2002
- Chitrangada Singh - Actress
- Shane Peacock - Fashion designer
- Falguni Peacock - Fashion designer
- Pulkit Samrat - Actor

== Contestants ==
The following is the list of the official delegates of Miss India 2020 representing 30 states +1 common winners from all Union territories of the country:

Color key

- Declared as Winner
- Ended as Runner-up
- Ended as one of the Finalists or Semi-finalists

Zone	State	Delegate	Age	Height
East	Bihar	Ananya Priyadarshini	22	
East	Chhattisgarh	Angela Kumar	19	1.70 m (5 ft 7 in)
East	Jharkhand	Rupali Bhushan	20	
East	Odisha	Subhashree Rayaguru	23	1.65 m (5 ft 5 in)
East	West Bengal	Mouli Haldar	22	1.73 m (5 ft 8 in)
North East	Arunachal Pradesh	Millo Meena		1.73 m (5 ft 8 in)
North East	Assam	Amrita Kashyap		1.62 m (5 ft 4 in)
North East	Manipur	Maria Pangambam		1.65 m (5 ft 5 in)
North East	Meghalaya	Tanvi Marak	22	1.75 m (5 ft 9 in)
North East	Mizoram	Lalmuansangi Varte	25	1.69 m (5 ft 6 1/2 in)
North East	Nagaland	Zuchobeni Tüngoe	22	1.70 m (5 ft 7 in)
North East	Sikkim	Reetika Chettri	20	1.60 m (5 ft 3 in)
North East	Tripura	Chayanika Debnath	25	1.62 m (5 ft 4 in)
North	Haryana	Manika Sheokand	26	1.73 m (5 ft 8 in)
North	Himachal Pradesh	Titiksha Taggar	22	
North	Jammu and Kashmir	Ritika Raina	22	
North	Madhya Pradesh	Rudrapriya Yadav		1.72 m (5 ft 7 1/2 in)
North	New Delhi	Supriya Dahiya	19	1.73 m (5 ft 8 in)
North	Punjab	Karuna Singh	23	1.64 m (5 ft 4 1/2 in)
North	Uttarakhand	Aishwarya Goel	25	1.77 m (5 ft 9 1/2 in)
North	Uttar Pradesh	Manya Singh	19	1.70 m (5 ft 7 in)
South	Andhra Pradesh	Tejal Patil	21	1.73 m (5 ft 8 in)
South	Karnataka	Rati Hulji	23	1.65 m (5 ft 5 in)
South	Kerala	Leena Lal	25	1.60 m (5 ft 3 in)
South	Tamil Nadu	Raina Garg	23	1.71 m (5 ft 7 1/2 in)
South	Telangana	Manasa Varanasi	24	1.76 m (5 ft 9 1/2 in)
West & Union Territory	Goa	Trisha Shetty	20	
West & Union Territory	Gujarat	Khushi Misra	21	1.63 m (5 ft 4 in)
West & Union Territory	Maharashtra	Angelika Sawhney	19	
West & Union Territory	Rajasthan	Aruna Beniwal	19	
West & Union Territory	Union Territory	Ritika Raghav	21	1.70 m (5 ft 7 in)
