= India at the Big Four beauty pageants =

The following is a list of India's official representatives and their placements at the Big Four beauty pageants, considered the most important in the world. The country has won a total of ten victories with eighty-nine placements in all four pageants:

- Three – Miss Universe crowns (1994 • 2000 • 2021)
- Six – Miss World crowns (1966 • 1994 • 1997 • 1999 • 2000 • 2017)
- One – Miss Earth crown (2010)

== National franchises and organisations ==
The Indian franchise holders of the four major beauty pageants are the following:

- Femina Miss India by the Times Group for Miss World
- Miss Divine Beauty by Deepak Agarwal for Miss Earth
- Miss Universe India by the Glamanand Group for Miss Universe and Miss International

== India's Big Four titleholders ==
India won its first Big Four title when Reita Faria from India bagged the Miss World 1966 title, becoming the first Asian to win Miss World. In 1994, Sushmita Sen won Miss Universe 1994, becoming the country's first ever Miss Universe titleholder. Later that year, Aishwarya Rai added to the winning streak, picking up the Miss World 1994 title.

Diana Hayden then won the Miss World 1997. Actor and model Yukta Mookhey was later crowned Miss World 1999. Six years after Sushmita Sen and Aishwarya Rai's double wins, Lara Dutta for Miss Universe 2000 and Priyanka Chopra for Miss World 2000 replicated the feat in 2000, marking the most recent time (as of 2026) that any country has won back-to-back at Miss World and, making India the last country to ever win at both Miss Universe and Miss World in the same year in the 20th century. India's appearances at the Miss Universe semifinals from 1992 to 2002 made it the first country in the Eastern Hemisphere to place annually at the pageant for at least 10 consecutive years.

In 2010, Nicole Faria from Bengaluru became the first Indian woman to win the Miss Earth 2010 pageant. Manushi Chhillar won the Miss World 2017 title and became the sixth Indian woman to be crowned Miss World. Harnaaz Sandhu won the Miss Universe 2021 title, becoming the third Indian woman to be crowned Miss Universe and the most recent Big Four pageant titleholder from India as of 2026.

== Summary ==
Colour Key

- Winner
- Ended as Runner-up
- Ended as one of the Finalists, Semi-finalists or Quarter-finalists

Year	Miss Universe	Miss World	Miss International	Miss Earth
2027	TBA	Sadhvi Sail; TBA	TBA	TBA
2026	Kaziah Mejo; TBA	Nikita Porwal; Top 40	Vaishnavi Ganesh; TBA	Aarya Aawadhoot; TBA
2025	Manika Vishwakarma; Top 30	Nandini Gupta; Top 20	Roosh Sindhu; Top 20	Komal Choudhary; Top 25
2024	Rhea Singha; Top 30	No Pageant Held	Rashmi Shinde	Gauri Gothankar
2023	Shweta Sharda; Top 20	Sini Shetty; Top 8	Praveena Aanjna	Priyan Sain; Top 20
2022	Divita Rai; Top 16	No Pageant Held	Zoya Afroz	Vanshika Parmar
2021	Harnaaz Sandhu; Miss Universe	Manasa Varanasi; Top 13	No pageant held due to COVID-19 pandemic	Rashmi Madhuri
2020	Adline Castelino; 3rd Runner-Up	No pageant held due to COVID-19 pandemic		Tanvi Kharote
2019	Vartika Singh; Top 20	Suman Rao; 2nd Runner-Up	Simrithi Bathija	Tejaswini Manogna
2018	Nehal Chudasama	Anukreethy Vas; Top 30	Tanishqa Bhosale	Nishi Bhardwaj
2017	Shraddha Shashidhar	Manushi Chhillar; Miss World	Ankita Kumari	Shaan Sumas Kumar
2016	Roshmitha Harimurthy	Priyadarshini Chatterjee; Top 20	Rewati Chetri	Rashi Yadav
2015	Urvashi Rautela	Aditi Arya	Ayeesha Aiman	Aaital Khosla
2014	Noyonita Lodh; Top 15	Koyal Rana; Top 10	Jhataleka Malhotra	Alankrita Sahai
2013	Manasi Moghe; Top 10	Navneet Kaur Dhillon; Top 20	Gurleen Grewal	Sobhita Dhulipala
2012	Shilpa Singh; Top 16	Vanya Mishra; Top 7	Rochelle Rao; Top 15	Prachi Mishra
2011	Vasuki Sunkavalli	Kanishtha Dhankhar; Top 31	Ankita Shorey	Hasleen Kaur
2010	Ushoshi Sengupta	Manasvi Mamgai	Neha Hinge; Top 15	Nicole Faria; Miss Earth
2009	Ekta Chowdhary	Pooja Chopra; Top 16	Harshita Saxena	Shriya Kishore; Top 16
2008	Simran Kaur Mundi	Parvathy Omanakuttan; 1st Runner-Up	Radha Brahmbhatt	Tanvi Vyas
2007	Puja Gupta; Top 10	Sarah-Jane Dias	Esha Gupta	Pooja Chitgopekar; Miss Earth – Air
2006	Neha Kapur; Top 20	Natasha Suri; Top 17	Sonnalli Seygall; Top 12	Amruta Patki; Miss Earth – Air
2005	Amrita Thapar	Sindhura Gadde; Top 15	Vaishali Desai	Niharika Singh
2004	Tanushree Dutta; Top 10	Sayali Bhagat	Mihika Verma; Top 15	Jyoti Brahmin; Top 16
2003	Nikita Anand	Ami Vashi; Top 5	Shonali Nagrani; 1st Runner-Up	Shweta Vijay
2002	Neha Dhupia; Top 10	Shruti Sharma; Top 20	Gauahar Khan	Reshmi Ghosh
2001	Celina Jaitley; 4th Runner-Up	Sara Corner	Kanwal Toor; Top 15	Shamita Singha; Top 10
2000	Lara Dutta; Miss Universe	Priyanka Chopra; Miss World	Gayatri Joshi; Top 15	↑ No Pageant Held (established in 2001 in Manila, Philippines)
1999	Gul Panag; Top 10	Yukta Mookhey; Miss World	Srikrupa Murali	↑ No Pageant Held (established in 2001 in Manila, Philippines)
1998	Lymaraina D'Souza; Top 10	Annie Thomas	Shvetha Jaishanker; 2nd Runner-Up	↑ No Pageant Held (established in 2001 in Manila, Philippines)
1997	Nafisa Joseph; Top 10	Diana Hayden; Miss World	Diya Abraham; 1st Runner-Up	↑ No Pageant Held (established in 2001 in Manila, Philippines)
1996	Sandhya Chib; Top 10	Rani Jeyraj; Top 5	Fleur Xavier	↑ No Pageant Held (established in 2001 in Manila, Philippines)
1995	Manpreet Brar; 1st Runner-Up	Preeti Mankotia	Priya Gill	↑ No Pageant Held (established in 2001 in Manila, Philippines)
1994	Sushmita Sen; Miss Universe	Aishwarya Rai; Miss World	Fransesca Hart	↑ No Pageant Held (established in 2001 in Manila, Philippines)
1993	Namrata Shirodkar; Top 6	Karminder Kaur-Virk	Pooja Batra; Top 15	↑ No Pageant Held (established in 2001 in Manila, Philippines)
1992	Madhu Sapre; 2nd Runner-Up	Shyla Lopez	Kamal Sandhu	↑ No Pageant Held (established in 2001 in Manila, Philippines)
1991	Christabelle Howie	Ritu Singh; Top 10	Preeti Mankotia; Top 15	↑ No Pageant Held (established in 2001 in Manila, Philippines)
1990	Suzanne Sablok; Top 10	Naveeda Mehdi	×	↑ No Pageant Held (established in 2001 in Manila, Philippines)
1989	Dolly Minhas	×	×	↑ No Pageant Held (established in 2001 in Manila, Philippines)
1988	×	Anuradha Kottur	Shikha Swaroop	↑ No Pageant Held (established in 2001 in Manila, Philippines)
1987	Priyadarshini Pradhan	Manisha Kohli	Erika Maria de Souza; Top 15	↑ No Pageant Held (established in 2001 in Manila, Philippines)
1986	Mehr Jessia	Maureen Lestourgeon	Poonam Gidwant	↑ No Pageant Held (established in 2001 in Manila, Philippines)
1985	Sonu Walia	Sharon Clarke	Vinita Vasan	↑ No Pageant Held (established in 2001 in Manila, Philippines)
1984	Juhi Chawla	Suchita Kumar	Nalanda Bhandar; Top 15	↑ No Pageant Held (established in 2001 in Manila, Philippines)
1983	Rekha Hande	Sweety Grewal	Sahila Chadha	↑ No Pageant Held (established in 2001 in Manila, Philippines)
1982	Pamela Singh	Uttara Mhatre Kher	Betty O'Connor	↑ No Pageant Held (established in 2001 in Manila, Philippines)
1981	Rachita Kumar	Deepti Divakar	Meenakshi Seshadri	↑ No Pageant Held (established in 2001 in Manila, Philippines)
1980	Sangeeta Bijlani	Elizabeth Anita Reddi; Top 15	Ulrike Bredemeyer; Top 15	↑ No Pageant Held (established in 2001 in Manila, Philippines)
1979	Swaroop Sampat	Raina Mendonica	Neeta Painter; Top 15	↑ No Pageant Held (established in 2001 in Manila, Philippines)
1978	Alamjeet Kaur Chauhan	Kalpana Iyer; Top 15	Sabita Dhanrajgir	↑ No Pageant Held (established in 2001 in Manila, Philippines)
1977	Bineeta Bose	×	Joan Stephens	↑ No Pageant Held (established in 2001 in Manila, Philippines)
1976	Naina Balsavar	×	Nafisa Ali; 2nd Runner-Up	↑ No Pageant Held (established in 2001 in Manila, Philippines)
1975	Meenakshi Kurpad	Anjana Sood; Top 15	Indira Bredemeyer; 2nd Runner-Up	↑ No Pageant Held (established in 2001 in Manila, Philippines)
1974	Shailini Dholakia; Top 12	Kiran Dholakia	Leslie Hartnett	↑ No Pageant Held (established in 2001 in Manila, Philippines)
1973	Farzana Habib; Top 12	×	Lynette Williams	↑ No Pageant Held (established in 2001 in Manila, Philippines)
1972	Roopa Satyan; Top 12	Malathi Basappa; 4th Runner-Up	Indira Muthanna	↑ No Pageant Held (established in 2001 in Manila, Philippines)
1971	Raj Gill	Prema Narayan	Samita Mukherjee	↑ No Pageant Held (established in 2001 in Manila, Philippines)
1970	Veena Sajnani	Heather Faville; Top 15	Patricia D'Souza; Top 15	↑ No Pageant Held (established in 2001 in Manila, Philippines)
1969	Kavita Bhambhani	Adina Shellim	Wendy Vaz	↑ No Pageant Held (established in 2001 in Manila, Philippines)
1968	Anjum Mumtaz Barg	Jane Coelho	Sumita Sen; Top 15	↑ No Pageant Held (established in 2001 in Manila, Philippines)
1967	Nayyara Mirza	×	×	↑ No Pageant Held (established in 2001 in Manila, Philippines)
1966	Yasmin Daji; 3rd Runner-Up	Reita Faria; Miss World	↑ No Pageant Held	↑ No Pageant Held (established in 2001 in Manila, Philippines)
1965	Persis Khambatta	×	×	↑ No Pageant Held (established in 2001 in Manila, Philippines)
1964	Meher Castelino Mistri	×	×	↑ No Pageant Held (established in 2001 in Manila, Philippines)
1963	×	×	×	↑ No Pageant Held (established in 2001 in Manila, Philippines)
1962	×	Ferial Karim; Top 15	Sheila Chonkar	↑ No Pageant Held (established in 2001 in Manila, Philippines)
1961	×	Veronica Torcato	Diana Valentine	↑ No Pageant Held (established in 2001 in Manila, Philippines)
1960	×	Iona Pinto	Iona Pinto; 1st Runner-Up	↑ No Pageant Held (established in 2001 in Manila, Philippines)
1959	×	Fleur Ezekiel	↑ No Pageant Held (established in 1960 in California, United States and then it was transferred in 1968 in Tokyo, Japan)	↑ No Pageant Held (established in 2001 in Manila, Philippines)
1958	×	↑ No Pageant Held (established in 1951 in England, United Kingdom. India sent their first delegate in 1959.)	↑ No Pageant Held (established in 1960 in California, United States and then it was transferred in 1968 in Tokyo, Japan)	↑ No Pageant Held (established in 2001 in Manila, Philippines)
1957	×	↑ No Pageant Held (established in 1951 in England, United Kingdom. India sent their first delegate in 1959.)	↑ No Pageant Held (established in 1960 in California, United States and then it was transferred in 1968 in Tokyo, Japan)	↑ No Pageant Held (established in 2001 in Manila, Philippines)
1956	×	↑ No Pageant Held (established in 1951 in England, United Kingdom. India sent their first delegate in 1959.)	↑ No Pageant Held (established in 1960 in California, United States and then it was transferred in 1968 in Tokyo, Japan)	↑ No Pageant Held (established in 2001 in Manila, Philippines)
1955	×	↑ No Pageant Held (established in 1951 in England, United Kingdom. India sent their first delegate in 1959.)	↑ No Pageant Held (established in 1960 in California, United States and then it was transferred in 1968 in Tokyo, Japan)	↑ No Pageant Held (established in 2001 in Manila, Philippines)
1954	×	↑ No Pageant Held (established in 1951 in England, United Kingdom. India sent their first delegate in 1959.)	↑ No Pageant Held (established in 1960 in California, United States and then it was transferred in 1968 in Tokyo, Japan)	↑ No Pageant Held (established in 2001 in Manila, Philippines)
1953	×	↑ No Pageant Held (established in 1951 in England, United Kingdom. India sent their first delegate in 1959.)	↑ No Pageant Held (established in 1960 in California, United States and then it was transferred in 1968 in Tokyo, Japan)	↑ No Pageant Held (established in 2001 in Manila, Philippines)
1952	Indrani Rehman	↑ No Pageant Held (established in 1951 in England, United Kingdom. India sent their first delegate in 1959.)	↑ No Pageant Held (established in 1960 in California, United States and then it was transferred in 1968 in Tokyo, Japan)	↑ No Pageant Held (established in 2001 in Manila, Philippines)
1951	↑ No Pageant Held (established in 1952 in California, United States and then it was transferred in 1960 in Florida, United States)	↑ No Pageant Held (established in 1951 in England, United Kingdom. India sent their first delegate in 1959.)	↑ No Pageant Held (established in 1960 in California, United States and then it was transferred in 1968 in Tokyo, Japan)	↑ No Pageant Held (established in 2001 in Manila, Philippines)

× Did not compete
↑ No pageant held

Pageant	Placements	Best result
Miss Universe	29	Winner (1994 • 2000 • 2021)
Miss World	31	Winner (1966 • 1994 • 1997 • 1999 • 2000 • 2017)
Miss International	21	1st Runner-Up (1960 • 1997 • 2003)
Miss Earth	8	Winner (2010)
Total	89	10 Titles

== Hostings ==
Year	pageant	Location	Venue	Date	Contestants
1996	Miss World	Bengaluru, Karnataka	M. Chinnaswamy Stadium	November 23, 1996	88
2023	Miss World	Mumbai, Maharashtra	Jio World Convention Center	March 9, 2024	112
2025	Miss World	Hyderabad, Telangana	HITEX Exhibition Centre	May 31, 2025	108

== List of crossovers ==
Crossover winners of a national pageant wins in another major national pageant and then participate in the line of international beauty pageants.

- Iona Pinto – Delegate of India by winning Miss India in 1960. She then participated in Miss International 1960, where she was the first-runner up. Her country sent her again for Miss World 1960 where she was one of the eighteen semifinalists.
- Preeti Mankotia – Delegate of India by winning Miss India in 1991. She then participated in Miss International 1991, where she was one of the fifteen finalists. She again participated in Femina Miss India 1995 where she was crowned as Miss India World and participated in Miss World 1995 where she was unable to place.

== See also ==
- I Am She–Miss Universe India, a former beauty pageant in India that sent its winner to Miss Universe from 2010 and 2012
- Miss Diva, a beauty pageant in India that sent its winner to Miss Universe from 2013 to 2023
