= Glamanand Group =

National beauty pageant organisation in India

- Formation: 2013
- Purpose: Beauty pageant
- Headquarters: New Delhi
- Location: India
- Official language: Hindi, English
- Owner: Nikhil Anand
- National Director: Nikhil Anand
- Key people: Nikhil Anand; Nishant Anand; Rajiv K Shrivastava
- Parent organisation: Glamanand Entertainment Pvt Ltd.
- Affiliations: Miss Universe; Miss International; Miss Charm; Miss Teen International; Miss Teen Universe; Miss Teen Earth; Mister Cosmo
- Website: www.glamanand.com

The Glamanand Group is an Indian organization headquartered in New Delhi, which organises national and international beauty pageants. It was founded in 2013 by Nikhil Anand, and has acquired a number of international beauty pageant licenses in India.

Glamanand Group owns three international pageants Miss Teen International, Miss Teen Earth and Miss Multinational.

== History ==
Current Franchisees
Membership	Year
Miss Tourism World	2017, 2023 – Present
Miss Teen International	2019 – Present
Miss Teen Universe	2019 – Present
Miss Charm	2024 – Present
Miss Universe	2024 – Present
Miss International	2015 – 2022, 2025-present
Former Franchisees
Membership	Year
Miss Asia Pacific International	2024
Miss Grand International	2020, 2022 – 2024
Miss Cosmo	2024
Miss Earth	2015, 2018
Miss Globe International	2016, 2021
Miss Multinational	2017 – 2022

Nikhil Anand founded the Glamanand Group after competing in Mr. North India 2013. In 2014, he launched Glamanand Entertainment Pvt Ltd, and in 2015, the company bought the national franchise rights for Miss Earth and Miss International.

The first Glamanand Super Model India pageant took place on 4 November 2015 at the Courtyard Marriott Hotel in New Delhi. This contest selected India's representatives for Miss Earth, Miss International, and Miss Tourism World. Supriya Aiman was the first titleholder of Glamanand Miss International India. The pageant continued annually until 2022.

In 2020, the Glamanand Group bought the license for Miss Grand International. To select India's representative, the organization introduced Miss Grand India in 2023. Miss Grand India 2023 Arshina Sumbul, reached the top 20 at Miss Grand International 2023, held in Vietnam. Sophiya Singh, originally chosen as Miss Tourism World India at Miss Grand India 2023, later became Miss Asia Pacific International India. She represented India at Miss Asia Pacific International 2024 in the Philippines, where she reached the yop 20, and won the Continental Queen of Asia title.

In 2024, Glamanand bought the franchise rights for four more international pageants: Miss Asia Pacific International, Miss Charm, Miss Cosmo International, and Miss Universe. Following this, the group launched Miss Universe India. State franchises were introduced to select participants for the national finals, and a national audition awarded wildcard entries. Non-resident Indian finalists were also included.

Miss Universe India 2024 was held on 22 September 2024, and was won by Rhea Singha. She represented India at Miss Universe 2024 in Mexico and reached the top 30.

=== International results ===
In 2015, the Glamanand Group sent its first representatives to Miss International, Miss Earth, and Miss Tourism World. None of them reached the semifinals.

In 2018, the group bought Miss Teen International. Ritika Khatnani, was first runner-up at the first Miss Teen International held in Gurgaon.

In 2019, Glamanand had its first international win when Aayushi Dholakia won Miss Teen International 2019.

Number of wins under the Glamanand Group
Pageant	Wins
Miss Grand International	1
Miss Teen International	1
Miss Teen Universe	1

In 2023, Arshina Sumbul, Miss Grand India 2023, represented India at Miss Grand International in Vietnam and reached the top 20.

On 25 October 2024, in Thailand, Rachel Gupta became the first Indian to win Miss Grand International title. This was the group's first international win outside of its own pageant. Gupta was the fourth contestant the group sent to the competition.

On 9 November 2024, Trishna Ray won Miss Teen Universe in South Africa, becoming the first Indian to win the title. This was the group's second international win.

In 2025, Miss International India 2025 Roosh Sindhu, represented India at Miss International 2025 in Japan and reached the top 20. She was the first Indian to have a placement at Miss International since Miss International 2012.

=== Competition irregularities ===
In November 2024, following India's win at the Miss Grand International 2024 pageant, Nikhil Anand, President of Glamanand Entertainment, publicly criticized Miss Grand International (MGI) on social media after their partnership ended. Anand accused MGI of disrespect, prioritizing financial gains, and attempting to draw comparisons with Miss Universe. He also highlighted that several national directors had left the organization due to its conduct. In response, MGI cited contractual violations and delayed payments, announcing that it would not renew its franchise agreement with Glamanand Entertainment.

== Representatives to International Pageants ==
Color key

- : Declared as winner
- : Ended as runner-up or top 5/6 qualification
- : Ended as one of the finalists/semi-finalists
- : Unplaced but given special award(s)

=== Current Franchise ===
==== Miss Universe ====
Year	Delegate	Age	Hometown	Placement & Performance	
Year	Delegate	Age	Hometown	Placements	Special award(s)
2024	Rhea Singha	19	Gujarat	Top 30	
2025	Manika Vishwakarma	22	Rajasthan	Top 30	
2026	Kaziah Mejo	19	Kerala	TBA	

==== Miss International ====
Year	Delegate	Age	Hometown	Placement & Performance	
Year	Delegate	Age	Hometown	Placements	Special award(s)
2015	Ayeesha Aiman	25	Bihar	Unplaced	
2016	Rewati Chetri	23	Assam	Unplaced	
2017	Ankita Kumari	22	Jharkhand	Unplaced	
2018	Tanishqa Bhosale	19	Maharashtra	Unplaced	
2019	Simrithi Bathija	20	Maharashtra	Unplaced	
2022	Zoya Afroz	28	Uttar Pradesh	Unplaced	
2025	Roosh Sindhu	25	Maharashtra	Top 20	2 Special Award: Best in Preliminary Evening Gown; Best in Preliminary Swimsuit (Top 8)
2026	Vaishnavi Ganesh	25	Tamil Nadu	TBA	

The Glamanand Group did not send a delegate to Miss International in the years 1960–2014, 2023 and 2024.

==== Miss Tourism World ====
Year	Delegate	Age	Hometown	Placement & Performance	
Year	Delegate	Age	Hometown	Placements	Special award(s)
2016	Sneha Jagiasi	25	Maharashtra	Unplaced	1 Special Award: Miss Tourism Best Personality
2017	Ishika Taneja	23	New Delhi	Unplaced	3 Special Awards: Miss Tourism World Business Woman; Miss Popularity; Miss Beauty with Brain
2023	Asmita Chakraborty	23	West Bengal	Unplaced	1 Special Award: Best Talent of the World
2024	Irene Dkhar	22	Meghalaya	Top 15	1 Special Award: 2nd Runner-Up – Best National Costume

==== Miss Charm ====
Year	Delegate	Age	Hometown	Placement & Performance	
Year	Delegate	Age	Hometown	Placements	Special award(s)
2024	Shivangi Desai	22	Maharashtra	Top 10	1 Special Award: Best in Evening Gown
2025	Mehak Dhingra	19	New Delhi	Top 12	1 Special Award: Best in Swimsuit
2026	Tejaswini Shrivastava	24	Maharashtra	TBA	

==== Miss Teen International ====
Year	Delegate	Age	Hometown	Placement & Performance	
Year	Delegate	Age	Hometown	Placements	Special award(s)
2018	Ritika Khatnani	16	Maharashtra	1st Runner-up	
2019	Aayushi Dholakia	16	Gujarat	Miss Teen International 2019	1 Special Award: Winner – Best National Costume
2022	Rashi Parasrampuria	19	Maharashtra	Top 10	1 Special Award: Miss Teen International Asia
2023	Mannat Siwach	16	Rajasthan	1st Runner-up	2 Special Awards: Beauty with a Purpose; Best in Ramp Walk
2024	Sejal Gupta	13	Punjab	Top 8	1 Special Award: Beauty with a Purpose
2025	Kaziah Liz Mejo	17	Kerala	1st Runner-up	1 Special Award: Miss Multimedia
2026	Divvya Wadhwa	16	Maharashtra	Top 18	

==== Miss Teen Universe ====
Year	Delegate	Age	Hometown	Placement & Performance	
Year	Delegate	Age	Hometown	Placements	Special award(s)
2019	Vridhi Jain	19	New Delhi	Top 11	2 Special Awards: Miss Teen Universe Asia; Best Hair
2021	Wachi Pareek	18	Chhattisgarh	2nd Runner-up	1 Special Award: Best in Interview
2022	Brunda Yerrabali	16	Karnataka	Top 10	1 Special Award: Top Model
2024	Trishna Ray	19	Odisha	Miss Teen Universe 2024	5 Special Awards: Winner – Miss Talent; Top 5 – Best National Costume; Top 10 – Influencer Challenge; Top 10 – Face to Face Challenge; Top 10 – Miss Social Media
2025	Carrissa Bopanna	19	Karnataka	3rd Runner-up	2 Special Awards: Top 5 – Best National Costume; Top 5 – People's Choice
2026	Neeranjana Tiwari	17	Uttar Pradesh	Top 14	

=== Former Franchise ===
The following is a list of franchises formerly held by the Glamanand Group, for which the organization no longer sends delegates.

==== Miss Asia Pacific International ====
Year	Delegate	Age	Hometown	Placement & Performance	
Year	Delegate	Age	Hometown	Placements	Special award(s)
2024	Sophiya Singh	29	Uttar Pradesh	Top 20	2 Special Awards: Continental Queen of Asia; 2nd Runner-up – Best National Costume

==== Miss Grand International ====
Year	Delegate	Age	Hometown	Placement & Performance	
Year	Delegate	Age	Hometown	Placements	Special award(s)
2020	Simran Sharma	22	Assam	Unplaced	1 Special Award: Top 15 – Queens with the Golden Crown
2022	Praachi Nagpal	24	Telangana	Unplaced	2 Special Awards: Top 10 – Pre-Arrival Voting; Top 10 – Country's Power of the Year challenge
2023	Arshina Sumbul	24	Rajasthan	Top 20	2 Special Awards: Top 20 – Best National Costume (Judge's Choice); Top 20 – Country's Power of the Year Challenge
2024	Rachel Gupta	20	Punjab	Miss Grand International 2024	5 Special Awards: Winner – Grand Pageant's Choice Award; Top 4 – Country's Power of the Year Challenge; Top 10 – Pre-Arrival Voting; Top 10 – Best in Swimsuit (Judge's Choice); Top 30 – Grand Voice Challenge

==== Miss Cosmo ====
Year	Delegate	Age	Hometown	Placement & Performance	
Year	Delegate	Age	Hometown	Placements	Special award(s)
2024	Rajashree Dowarah	19	Assam	Unplaced	

==== Miss Earth ====
Year	Delegate	Age	Hometown	Placement & Performance	
Year	Delegate	Age	Hometown	Placements	Special award(s)
2015	Aaital Khosla	20	Punjab	Unplaced	1 Special Award: Winner – Cooking challenge (Team Asia)
2018	Nishi Bhardwaj	23	New Delhi	Unplaced	1 Special Award: 2nd Runner-Up – Resort Wear Competition (Air Group)

==== The Miss Globe ====
Year	Delegate	Age	Hometown	Placement & Performance	
Year	Delegate	Age	Hometown	Placements	Special award(s)
2016	Rammya Singh Ahluwalia	21	Punjab	Did not participate	
2021	Tanya Sinha	23	Jharkhand	Did not participate	

==== Miss Multinational ====
Year	Delegate	Age	Hometown	Placement & Performance	
Year	Delegate	Age	Hometown	Placements	Special award(s)
2017	Shefali Sharma	22	New Delhi	2nd Runner-up	
2018	Simran Sharma	20	Assam	Top 8	1 Special Award: Best National Costume
2021	Tanvi Malhara	25	Maharashtra	No competition held	
2022	Divija Gambhir	25	Rajasthan	No competition held	

== See also ==
- List of beauty pageants in India
