= Miss Teen Diva =

National beauty pageant competition in India

- Formation: 2020
- Type: Beauty pageant
- Headquarters: New Delhi
- Location: India
- Members: Miss Teen International; Miss Teen Universe; Miss Teen Earth
- Official language: Hindi, English
- Owner: Nikhil Anand
- National director: Nikhil Anand
- Key people: Nikhil Anand; Nishant Anand; Rajiv K Shrivastava
- Parent organisation: Glamanand Group
- Subsidiaries: Miss Teen India
- Website: www.missteendiva.com

Miss Teen Diva is a national beauty pageant in India that annually selects representatives to compete in Miss Teen International, Miss Teen Universe and Miss Teen Earth Pageants. The beauty pageant was started in 2020 by the Glamanand Group and was merged with Miss Teen India for three years.

Miss Teen Diva 2020 was the first edition of the beauty pageant, where Rashi Parasrampuria was crowned Miss Teen International India. Wachi Pareek was crowned Miss Teen Universe India, Aishwarya Vinu Nair was crowned Miss Teen Earth India, and Sayali Ayre was Crowned Miss Teen Multinational India.

Miss Teen Diva is India's most prestigious teen pageant, having all the major international teen pageant franchisees under the national pageant. The reigning Miss Teen Diva(Miss Teen Diva 2021) (Miss Teen International India) is Mannat Siwach, crowned by the outgoing titleholder Rashi Parasrampuria. At Miss Teen Diva 2021, Brunda Yerrabali has crowned Miss Teen Universe India, Rabia Hora as Miss Teen Earth India, and Mahika Biyani was crowned Miss Teen Multinational India.

== History ==
India's representatives to the Miss Teen International beauty pageant were initially selected by the Miss Teen India Pageant, which was founded in 2016. The first winner of the Miss Teen India Pageant was Ritika Khatnani, who represented India at Miss Teen International in 2018. Khatnani finished as the first-runner up in the pageant. Aayushi Dholakia succeeded Khatnani as Miss Teen International India in 2019, and she went on to become the first Asian to win the Miss Teen International pageant.

Since 2019, India's representative to Miss Teen Universe was also sent by Miss Teen Diva Organisation. Vridhi Jain was the first Miss Teen Universe India. In 2020, Glamanand Group announced Miss Teen Diva Pageant and merged Miss Teen India with Miss Teen Diva for the initial years to build Miss Teen Diva.

== Representatives to international pageants ==
Glamanand Group has been selecting India's representatives for this pageant since the year 2018.

=== Miss Teen International ===
Year	Delegate	Age	Hometown	Placement & Performance	
Year	Delegate	Age	Hometown	Placements	Special award(s)
2018	Ritika Khatnani	16	Maharashtra	1st Runner-up	
2019	Aayushi Dholakia	16	Gujarat	Miss Teen International 2019	1 Special Award: Winner – Best National Costume
2022	Rashi Parasrampuria	19	Maharashtra	Top 10	1 Special Award: Miss Teen International Asia
2023	Mannat Siwach	16	Rajasthan	1st Runner-up	2 Special Awards: Beauty with a Purpose; Best in Ramp Walk
2024	Sejal Gupta	13	Punjab	Top 8	1 Special Award: Beauty with a Purpose
2025	Kaziah Liz Mejo	17	Kerala	1st Runner-up	1 Special Awards: Miss Multimedia
2026	Divvya Wadhwa	16	Maharashtra	TBA	

=== Miss Teen Universe ===
Year	Delegate	Age	Hometown	Placement & Performance	
Year	Delegate	Age	Hometown	Placements	Special award(s)
2019	Vridhi Jain	19	New Delhi	Top 11	2 Special Awards: Miss Teen Universe Asia; Best Hair
2021	Wachi Pareek	18	Chhattisgarh	2nd Runner-up	1 Special Award: Best in Interview
2022	Brunda Yerrabali	16	Karnataka	Top 10	1 Special Award: Top Model
2024	Trishna Ray	19	Odisha	Miss Teen Universe 2024	5 Special Awards: Winner – Miss Talent; Top 5 – Best National Costume; Top 10 – Influencer Challenge; Top 10 – Face to Face Challenge; Top 10 – Miss Social Media
2025	Carrissa Bopanna	19	Karnataka	3rd Runner-up	1 Special Award: Winner – Face to Face Challenge
2026	Prasuci Panda	16	Odisha	TBA	

=== Miss Teen Earth ===
Year	Delegate	Age	Hometown	Placement & Performance	
Year	Delegate	Age	Hometown	Placements	Special award(s)
2025	Khushi Yadav	16	New Delhi	Unplaced	

=== Miss Teen Icon ===
Year	Delegate	Age	Hometown	Placement & Performance	
Year	Delegate	Age	Hometown	Placements	Special award(s)
2024	Parineeta Bakshi	19	New Delhi	Top 11 (5th Runner-up)	
2025	Lavanya Das	18	Odisha	Unplaced	1 Special Award: Miss Charming

=== Miss Teen Grand ===
Year	Delegate	Age	Hometown	Placement & Performance	
Year	Delegate	Age	Hometown	Placements	Special award(s)
2023	Kashish Goswami	19	Gujarat	2nd Runner-up	
