= Miss Universe India 2026 =

3rd Miss Universe India pageant

- Date: 23 August 2026
- Venue: Zee Studios Jaipur, Rajasthan
- Broadcaster: YouTube
- Entrants: 52
- Placements: 20
- Winner: Kaziah Liz Mejo; Kerala

Miss Universe India 2026 was the third edition of the Miss Universe India pageant, held at the Zee Studios in Jaipur, Rajasthan, on 23 August 2026.

At the end of the event, Manika Vishwakarma crowned Kaziah Liz Mejo as her successor. Mejo is set to represent India at Miss Universe 2026 to be held in November 2026 in Puerto Rico. Meanwhile, Vaishnavi Ganesh of Tamil Nadu will represent India at Miss International 2026 in Japan, while Tejaswini Shrivastava of Maharashtra will represent India at Miss Charm 2026 in Vietnam.

== Background ==
=== Location and date ===
On July 1 2026, the Miss Universe India organisation announced on their social media platforms that the final of the 2026 edition will held on 23 August 2026 in Zee Studios in Jaipur, Rajasthan, with the pageant's activities will held across four cities: Jaipur, Indore, Banglore and New Delhi.

=== Selection of participants ===
A total of 52 contestants (31 states & union territories, 20 wildcards and 1 NRI) were selected for the competition.

The applicants registered online and their applications were transferred to state directors for regional auditions and state pageants which held during March and June 2026.

On 19 June 2026 the Miss Universe India organisation conducted a final audition for the state auditions of Chhattisgarh, Jammu and Kashmir, Madhya Pradesh, Nagaland, Odisha, Tripura, Uttarakhand, and Union territory along with the wildcard and NRI entrants.

=== Selection Committee ===
- Celina Jaitly – Actress, Miss Universe India 2001
- Sushmita Sen – Actress, Miss Universe 1994 from India
- Urvashi Rautela – Actress, Miss Universe India 2015
- Rhea Singha – Actress, Miss Universe India 2024
- Anna Blanco – Miss Charm 2025 from Venezuela
- Pragya Yadav – Film Producer, Environmentalist
- Nikhil Anand – National Director, Miss Universe India
- Rajeev Shrivastava – Academician
- Vishal Ladha – Entrepreneur

== Results ==
=== Placements ===
Placement	Contestant	International Placement
Miss Universe India 2026	MUI. #18 – Kaziah Liz Mejo	TBD – Miss Universe 2026
1st Runner-Up	MUI. #52 – Vaishnavi Ganesh	TBD – Miss International 2026
2nd Runner-Up	MUI. #8 – Anushri Satavlekar	
3rd Runner-Up	MUI. #48 – Tejaswini Shrivastava	TBD - Miss Charm 2026
4th Runner-Up	MUI. #7 – Anubha Vashisth	
Top 11	MUI. #5 – Anshika Choudhary; MUI. #13 – Dipali Riya; MUI. #15 – Harshita Sahu ∆; MUI. #25 – Pinky Basumatary; MUI. #31 – Riya Tirkey; MUI. #44 – Sritara Pasricha	
Top 22	MUI. #20 – Lalrin Chhani §; MUI. #21 – Lekana Hegde; MUI. #27 – Pramiti Rana; MUI. #35 – Sanwaka Surong; MUI. #38 – Shreya Bediya; MUI. #39 – Simar Khaneja; MUI. #41 – Snehal Rawat; MUI. #42 – Spoorthi Shetty; MUI. #45 – Swati Nadiyal; MUI. #49 – Thadoi Yumnam; MUI. #51 – Umanga Kumawat	

§ – Voted into the Top 20 by winning Miss Popular Award
∆ – Winner of Beauty with a Purpose Award

=== Appointment ===
The Miss Universe India pageant awards multiple international titles to its finalists. Alongside the main title of Miss Universe India, additional titles, including Miss International India, and Miss Charm India were awarded. The titleholders will represent India at the 2026 editions of their respective international pageants.

Color keys

- The contestant won in an international pageant.
- The contestant was a finalist/runner-up in an international pageant.
- The contestant was a semi-finalist in an international pageant.

=== Special Awards ===
==== Sub-title Awards ====
Awards	Results	Contestants
Best in Speech
Best in Speech	Winner	• Sneh Tiku
Best in Speech	Top 5	Hasitha Narayanabhatta; Riya Tirkey; Spoorthi Shetty; Swati Nadiyal

Awards	Results	Contestants
Best in Talent round
Best in Talent round	Winner	• Tejaswini Shrivastava

== Pre-pageant events ==
=== Miss Popular Vote ===
On August 16, 2026 public voting for the Miss Popular Vote Award was announced on social media platforms.

- Advanced to the Top 20 as Miss Popular Vote Awardee.

Placement	Contestant
Winner	Mizoram

=== Other events ===
Leading up to the final competition, a variety of events were held as part of the pageant. On July 19, the sashing ceremony was held in Jaipur. On July 24, a gala round was held in Jaipur. On July 29, a swimsuit competition was held in Wonderla Resort, Banglore. On August 8, a sufi night was organised in Unwind Resort, Indore.

External videos
- Sashing Ceremony
- Swimsuit Competition

== Contestants ==
52 contestants are competing for the title

No.	Contestants	Age (Note: Ages at the time of the pageant.)	State/Territory (Note: State winner of Chhattisgarh, Jammu and Kashmir, Madhya Pradesh, Nagaland, Odisha, Tripura, Uttarakhand, and Union territory were each selected through a final audition conducted by Miss Universe India organisation.)	Audition Category	Notes
1	Aarya Mardikar	—	Maharashtra	Wildcard	2nd Runner-up at Miss Universe Maharashtra 2026
2	Aditi Prabhu	—	Maharashtra	Wildcard	Top 8 State Finalist at Miss Universe Kerala 2026
3	Ahina Datta	30	Tripura	State	
4	Annie Sharma	—	Delhi	Wildcard	1st Runner-up at Miss Universe Delhi 2026
5	Anshika Choudhary	22	Rajasthan	State	
6	Anshula Baruah	19	Assam	Wildcard	
7	Anubha Vashisht	29	Uttarakhand	State	Top 11 finalist at Miss Universe India 2024
8	Anushri Satavlekar	25	Gujarat	State	
9	Chandrima Das	22	West Bengal	State	
10	Devu Suresh	—	Kerala	Wildcard	
11	Diksha Jangra	25	Haryana (United States of America)	NRI	
12	Diksha Panday	—	Uttarakhand	Wildcard	
13	Dipali Riya	24	Jharkhand	State	Top 30 finalist at Miss Universe Bihar 2025; Top 5 state finalist at Femina Miss India 2024
14	Fasiha Nauman	—	Andhra Pradesh	State	Top 10 state finalist at Femina Miss India 2018 representing Telangana
15	Harshita Sahu	23	Madhya Pradesh	Wildcard	
16	Hasitha Narayanabhatta	19	Telangana	State	
17	Karishma Mehra	19	Chhattisgarh	State	
18	Kaziah Liz Mejo	19	Kerala	State	1st Runner-up at Miss Teen International 2025
19	Kumari Nikita	—	Jharkhand	Wildcard	1st Runner-up at Miss Universe Bihar 2026
20	Lalrin Chhani	23	Mizoram	State	
21	Lekana Hegde	25	Karnataka	State	Previously competed in Miss Universe India 2025 as wildcard; Top 16 state finalist at Femina Miss India 2023
22	Liz Jaimon Jacob	—	Kerala	Wildcard	2nd Runner-up at Miss Universe Kerala 2026
23	Mannat Sharma	25	Punjab	State	Top 11 state finalist at Femina Miss India 2023 representing Haryana
24	Pema Choden Bhutiya	25	Sikkim	State	1st Runner-up at Miss International India 2023
25	Pinky Basumatary	21	Assam	State	
26	Poonam Maharana	22	Odisha	State	
27	Pramiti Rana	20	Delhi	State	
28	Preeti Yadav	24	Goa	State	
29	Pura Sumpi	21	Arunachal Pradesh	State	
30	Rithambara	—	Rajasthan	Wildcard	2nd Runner-up at Miss Universe Haryana 2026; 2nd Runner-up at Miss Universe Rajasthan 2026
31	Riya Tirkey	28	Jharkhand	Wildcard	Top 11 finalist at Miss Universe India 2025
32	Roshni Ghosh Roy	—	Delhi	Wildcard	
33	Rupali Bhushan	26	Bihar	State	1st Runner-up at Miss Universe Bihar 2025; Top 15 finalist at Femina Miss India 2020 representing Jharkhand
34	Sakshi Wadaskar	—	Maharashtra	Wildcard	
35	Sanwaka Surong	26	Meghalaya	State	Top 3 state finalist at Femina Miss India 2023
36	Sanya Singhal	—	Delhi	Wildcard	
37	Sezer Pathania	—	Himachal Pradesh	Wildcard	1st Runner-up at Miss Universe Himachal Pradesh 2026
38	Shreya Bediya	—	Madhya Pradesh	Wildcard	
39	Simar Khaneja	24	Union territory	State	
40	Sneh Ticku	26	Jammu and Kashmir	State	
41	Snehal Rawat	21	Himachal Pradesh	State	Top 5 finalist at Miss Universe Himachal Pradesh 2025
42	Spoorthi Shetty	—	Karnataka	Wildcard	1st Runner-up at Miss Universe Karnataka 2026; Top 12 finalist at Miss Grand India 2024
43	Srishti Kaninde	—	Telangana	Wildcard	1st Runner-up at Miss Universe Telangana 2026
44	Sritara Pasricha	19	Haryana	State	2nd Runner-up at Miss Teen of the Universe 2025
45	Swati Nadiyal	30	Himachal Pradesh	Wildcard	
46	Tanishka Sharma	21	Uttar Pradesh	State	Top 8 state finalist at Femina Miss India 2026
47	Tejasvi Soni	—	Maharashtra	Wildcard	1st Runner-up at Miss Universe Gujarat 2026
48	Tejaswini Shrivastava	24	Maharashtra	State	Top 10 finalist at Miss Universe India 2024 competed as wildcard; 1st Runner-up at Miss Earth India 2023; Top 25 state finalist at Femina Miss India 2023
49	Thadoi Yumnam	21	Manipur	State	
50	Tsurila Jankhiungru	28	Nagaland	State	3rd Runner-up at Miss Grand India 2025
51	Umanga Kumawat	—	Madhya Pradesh	State	
52	Vaishnavi Ganesh	25	Tamil Nadu	State	Top 16 state finalist at Femina Miss India 2023 representing Karnataka; Top 10 finalist at Miss Diva 2020
