= Miss Universe India 2025 =

- Date: 18 August 2025
- Presenters: Asmita Chakraborty; Chayanika Debnath
- Venue: Jaipur, Rajasthan
- Entrants: 48
- Placements: 20
- Debuts: Union territory
- Withdrawals: Maharashtra
- Returns: Jammu and Kashmir; Telangana
- Winner: Manika Vishwakarma
- Congeniality: Samiksha Singh
- Best National Costume: Himanshi Singh; Kaamaakshee Aathreya; Roosh Sindhu
- Photogenic: Roosh Sindhu

Miss Universe India 2025 is the 2nd edition of the Miss Universe India pageant, held on 18 August 2025 in Jaipur, Rajasthan. This edition was organized by the Glamanand Group, the parent organization of Miss Universe India.

At the end of the event, Rhea Singha crowned Manika Vishwakarma as her successor. She represented India at the 74th Miss Universe Pageant on November 21, 2025 in Thailand where she finished as Top 30.

== Results ==
=== Placements ===
Placement	Contestant	International Placement
Miss Universe India 2025	MUI. #21 – Manika Vishwakarma	Top 30 – Miss Universe 2025
1st Runner-Up	MUI. #43 – Tanya Sharma	
2nd Runner-up	MUI. #22 – Mehak Dinghrra	Top 12 – Miss Charm 2025
3rd Runner-Up	MUI. #03 – Amishi Kaushik	
4th Runner-Up	MUI. #37 – Sarangthem Nirupama §	
Miss International India 2025	MUI. #32 – Roosh Sindhu	Top 20 – Miss International 2025
Top 11	MUI. #24 – Ojasvi Sharma; MUI. #29 – Riddhi Kumar; MUI. #30 – Riya Tirkey; MUI. #46 – Vaamshi Uday ∆; MUI. #48 – Wachi Pareek	
Top 20	MUI. #01 – Aiswarya Sreenivasan; MUI. #06 – Asmita Chowdhury; MUI. #10 – Evelyn Zachhingpuii; MUI. #14 – Kaamaakshee Aathreya; MUI. #26 – Radhika Singhal; MUI. #28 – Ravitanaya Sharma; MUI. #31 – Rizul Singh; MUI. #35 – Samiksha Singh; MUI. #42 – Smiti Chhabra	

§ – Voted into the Top 20 by winning Miss Popular Award
∆ – Winner of Beauty with a Purpose Award

=== Appointment ===
For the first time, the Miss Universe India pageant will confer multiple international titles to its finalists. Alongside the main title of Miss Universe India, additional titles, including Miss International India, Miss Charm India, Miss Global India, and Miss Tourism World India, will be awarded. Except for Miss Global India, the titleholders will represent India at the 2025 editions of their respective international pageants.

Color keys

- The contestant won in an international pageant.
- The contestant was a finalist/runner-up in an international pageant.
- The contestant was a semi-finalist in an international pageant.

Title	Contestant	International Placement	Ref.
Miss Charm India 2025	Mehak Dhingra	Top 12 – Miss Charm 2025	TBA

=== Special awards ===
The subcontests for Miss Universe India 2025 commenced on July 26, 2025, in Indore. The first set of finalists from these subcontests was announced through the organization's official social media channels.

Awards	Results	Contestants
Best in Speech	Winner	Saanvi Sharma
Best in Speech	Top 5	Manika Vishwakarma; Ravitanaya Sharma; Riddhi Kumar; Shambhavi Jha

=== Special awards ===
Award	Contestant
Next Gen Glam Award by Lakmé	MUI. #24 - Ojasvi Sharma
Beauty with Brains	MUI. #33 – Saanvi Sharma
Beauty with a purpose	MUI. #46 – Vaamshi Uday
Best Hair and Makeup	MUI. #24 – Ojasvi Sharma
Best State Director	Nandini Nagaraj – Karnataka
Best in Evening Gown	MUI. #43 – Tanya Sharma
Best in Fitness	MUI. #44 – Tasneem Raza
Best in Personal Interview	MUI. #21 – Manika Vishwakarma
Best in Rampwalk	MUI. #30 – Riya Tirkey
Best in Sports	MUI. #03 – Amishi Kaushik
Best in Swimsuit	MUI. #22 – Mehak Dhingra
Best in Talent	MUI. #05 – Anushka Ghosh
Best National Costume	MUI. #11 – Himanshi Singh; MUI. #14 – Kaamaakshee Aathreya; MUI. #32 – Roosh Sindhu
Media Choice Award	MUI. #06 – Asmita Chowdhury
Miss Beautiful Eyes	MUI. #03 – Amishi Kaushik
Miss Beautiful Smile	MUI. #14 – Kaamaakshee Aathreya; MUI. #21 – Manika Vishwakarma; MUI. #24 – Ojasvi Sharma; MUI. #25 – Prakruthi Kambam; MUI. #29 – Riddhi Kumar; MUI. #46 – Vaamshi Uday
Miss Congeniality	MUI. #35 – Samiksha Singh
Miss Fashion Icon	MUI. #42 – Smiti Chhabra
Miss Glowing Skin	MUI. #32 – Roosh Sindhu
Miss Gorgeous Hair	MUI. #24 – Ojasvi Sharma
Miss Photogenic	MUI. #32 – Roosh Sindhu
Miss Popular	MUI. #37 – Sarangthem Nirupama
Miss Sudoku	MUI. #03 – Amishi Kaushik
Miss Timeless Beauty	MUI. #31 – Rizul Singh
Top Model	MUI. #22 – Mehak Dhingra

== Background ==
=== Selection of participants ===
The national organization announced the launch of the new edition under state license holders, scheduled to begin in early 2025. Contestants were selected through various state-level competitions, with the winners advancing to the final national event.

Additionally, a final open audition, independent of state-level selections, was held in June in New Delhi, where participants were chosen as wild card entrants for the finals. A separate group of international contestants holding OCI (Overseas Citizen of India) cards participated in online auditions. Those shortlisted were granted NRI entry into the competition.

==== Participants' withdrawals ====
In early July, NRI finalists Ghazal Gill and Manju Bangalore withdrew from the competition. Gill cited health-related reasons that prevented her from traveling, while Bangalore did not disclose a reason for her withdrawal. On 5 August, wildcard delegates Varshini Murugan and Shivin Ganesan of Tamil Nadu also withdrew for contractual concerns. On 12 August, Andleeb Zaidi Merchant announced her withdrawal in a video statement, citing what she described as a toxic environment. She had previously shared on social media that she was experiencing cyberbullying.

On 15 August, hours before the preliminary competition, Maruschka Sahiboe announced her withdrawal via Instagram. She stated that she had not been given sufficient time to review the contract, and after consulting her lawyer and advisers, was advised against signing. According to her, the contract would have bound her to Glamanand "for years under terms that do not align with [her] values, vision and career direction." Shortly after Sahiboe's announcement, another NRI finalist, Chanchal Kaur, also withdrew, citing contractual concerns similar to those raised by Sahiboe.

=== Selection Committee ===
- Ashley Rebello – Fashion designer
- Farhad Samji – Indian film director and screenwriter
- Kirti Rathore – Fashion designer
- Niharica Raizada – Luxembourgish actress
- Nikita Rattanshi - Director at K Sera Sera
- Rajiv K Shrivastava – Founder of the Act Now Organisation
- Rashmita Rasindran – Miss Charm 2024 from Malaysia
- Urvashi Rautela – Actress and Miss Universe India 2015
- Vishal Ladia – Entrepreneur

== Contestants ==
The following is the list of confirmed contestants for Miss Universe India:

No.	Delegate	Age (Note: Ages at the time of the pageant.)	State/Territory/Country	Audition Category	Ref.
1	Aiswarya Sreenivasan	25	Kerala	State	
2	Akanksha Choudhary	22	Rajasthan	Wildcard	
3	Amishi Kaushik	23	Haryana	State	
—N/a	~~Andleeb Zaidi~~	~~28~~	~~Maharashtra~~	~~State~~	—N/a
4	Anjali Pawar	29	Chhattisgarh	State	
5	Anushka Ghosh	21	Odisha	State	
6	Asmita Chowdhury	23	Gujarat	Wildcard	
7	Bhanvi Bharadwaj	24	Jammu and Kashmir	State	
8	Chaivalry Lartang	23	Meghalaya	State	
—N/a	~~Chanchal Kaur~~	~~27~~	~~Australia~~	~~NRI~~	—N/a
9	Divyanshi Sachi	TBA	Bihar	Wildcard	
10	Evelyn Zachhingpuii	26	Mizoram	State	
—N/a	~~Ghazal Gill~~	~~29~~	~~United States~~	~~NRI~~	—N/a
11	Himanshi Singh	25	Haryana	Wildcard	
12	Jackielynn Pradhan	21	Sikkim	State	
13	Jahnvi Malhotra	26	Madhya Pradesh	State	
14	Kaamaakshee Aathreya	19	Tamil Nadu	State	
15	Kashvi	19	Telangana	State	
16	Kelulu Dawhuo	19	Nagaland	State	
17	Khumjar Debbarma	21	Tripura	State	
18	Lekana Hegde	24	Karnataka	Wildcard	
19	Longku Komal	23	Arunachal Pradesh	State	
20	Lucky Barrot	20	Gujarat	State	
21	Manika Vishwakarma	22	Rajasthan	Wildcard	
—N/a	~~Manju Bangalore~~	~~27~~	~~United States~~	~~NRI~~	—N/a
—N/a	~~Maruschka Sahiboe~~	~~32~~	~~Netherlands~~	~~NRI~~	—N/a
22	Mehak Dhingra	19	Delhi	Wildcard	
23	Neha Baruah	26	Assam	State	
24	Ojasvi Sharma	23	Delhi	Wildcard	
25	Prakruthi Kambam	25	Andhra Pradesh	State	
26	Radhika Singhal	23	Uttarakhand	State	
27	Raksha Jaiswal	22	Maharashtra	Wildcard/State (Note: Following Andleeb Zaidi's withdrawal from the competition, Raksha Jaiswal, a former state finalist, was appointed as Miss Universe India Maharashtra 2025.)	
28	Ravitanaya Sharma	25	Punjab	State	
29	Riddhi Kumar	27	Maharashtra	Wildcard	
30	Riya Tirkey	27	Jharkhand	State	
31	Rizul Singh	23	Himachal Pradesh	State	
32	Roosh Sindhu	22	Gujarat	Wildcard	
33	Saanvi Sharma	23	Uttar Pradesh	Wildcard	
34	Sachi Kudale	24	Maharashtra	Union Territory	
35	Samiksha Singh	25	Delhi	Wildcard	
36	Sanjana Sood	21	Delhi	Wildcard	
37	Sarangthem Nirupama	24	Manipur	State	
38	Saumya Verma	20	Delhi	Wildcard	
39	Shambhavi Jha	24	Bihar	State	
40	Shaswati Bala	26	West Bengal	State	
41	Sheena Parashar	24	Rajasthan	State	
—N/a	~~Shivin Ganesan~~	~~29~~	~~Tamil Nadu~~	~~Wildcard~~	—N/a
42	Smiti Chhabra	26	Delhi	State	
43	Tanya Sharma	22	Uttar Pradesh	State	
44	Tasneem Raza	41	United Arab Emirates	NRI	
45	Tokmem Mengu	TBA	Arunachal Pradesh	Wildcard	
46	Vaamshi Uday	27	Karnataka	State	
47	Vaishanavi Thakur	21	Goa	State	
—N/a	~~Varshini Murugan~~	~~25~~	~~Tamil Nadu~~	~~Wildcard~~	—N/a
48	Wachi Pareek	23	Chhattisgarh	Wildcard	

== Crossovers ==
Contestants who previously competed in other national and international beauty pageants with their respective placements:

=== National Pageants ===
==== Femina Miss India ====
===== National Finalists =====
- FMI 2024 Telangana: Prakruthi Kambam
- FMI 2023 West Bengal: Shaswati Bala (Top 12)
- FMI 2023 Uttar Pradesh: Tanya Sharma (Top 12)
- FMI 2022 Jharkhand: Riya Tirkey

===== State Finalists =====
- FMI 2024 Bihar: Shambhavi Jha (Top 5 state finalist)
- FMI 2024 Kerala: Aiswarya Sreenivasan (Top 5 state finalist)
- FMI 2023 Mizoram: Smiti Chhabra (Top 2 state finalist)
- FMI 2023 Union Territory: Ravitanaya Sharma (Top 10 state finalist)
- FMI 2022 Madhya Pradesh: Amishi Kaushik (Top 10 state finalist)
- FMI 2022 Uttarakhand: Smiti Chhabra (Top 10 state finalist)
- FMI 2020 Maharashtra: Sachi Kudale (Top 5 state finalist)
- FMI 2019 Madhya Pradesh: Anjali Pawar (Top 3 state finalist)

==== Miss Diva ====
- 2024: Mehak Dhingra (Top 20)
- 2022: Ojasvi Sharma (Miss Popular Choice Winner)
- 2021: Sachi Kudale (Top 20)

==== Miss Universe India ====
- MUI 2024 Gujarat: Roosh Sindhu
- MUI 2024 Haryana: Amishi Kaushik (Withdrawn)
- MUI 2024 Rajasthan: Manika Vishwakarma (Top 20)
- MUI 2024 Uttar Pradesh: Saanvi Sharma (Top 20)
- MUI 2024 Wildcard: Ojasvi Sharma (Top 10)
- MUI 2024 Wildcard: Wachi Pareek (Top 20)

=== International Pageants ===
Miss Teen Universe

- 2022: Wachi Pareek (2nd Runner-Up)
