= Miss Teen International 2025 =

- Date: August 31, 2025
- Presenters: Ngô Ngọc Gia Hân; Wachi Pareek
- Venue: Zee Studios, Jaipur, India
- Entrants: 24
- Placements: 15
- Debuts: Peru; Puerto Rico; Romania
- Withdrawals: Bangladesh; Brazil; Cambodia; Indonesia; Lithuania; Mongolia; Nepal; South Africa; Thailand; Uganda
- Returns: Canada; France; Paraguay
- Winner: Lorena Ruiz; Spain

Miss Teen International 2025 was the 6th edition of the Miss Teen International pageant. It was held on August 31, 2025, in Zee Studios, Jaipur, India. 24 contestants from around the world participated in the pageant. The show was hosted by Ngô Ngọc Gia Hân, Miss Teen International 2022 from Vietnam and Wachi Pareek, top 10 finalist of Miss Universe India 2025. It was broadcast live on Glamanand's official YouTube channel.

At the end of the event, Muyleang Ly of Cambodia crowned Lorena Ruiz of Spain as her successor.

== Final results ==
Placement	Candidate
Miss Teen International 2024	Spain — Lorena Ruiz
1st runner-up	India - Kaziah Liz Mejo
2nd runner-up	Colombia - Valeria Morales Valero
3rd Runner-up	Puerto Rico - Sabrina Maria Feliciano
4th Runner-up	Mexico - Grecia Novelo
Top 8	Cuba - Amalia Martinez; Dominican Republic - Esmeilin Tejada Pérez; France - Anaïs Holtzmann Miranda §
Top 15	Germany - Laurina Vincentina Indrunas; Namibia - Elaine Engelbrecht; Netherlands - Liora Smit; Philippines - Anna Margaret Mercado; Sri Lanka - Tanushi Amaya; United States - Alanys Cuevas; Venezuela - Tatiana Zambrano Bermudez

§ – Voted into the Top 8 by the viewers and awarded as Eventista Miss Popular Vote

=== Special awards ===
Position	Contestant
Miss Multimedia	India - Kaziah Liz Mejo
Best in Swimsuit	Venezuela - Tatiana Zambrano Bermudez
Best Body	Spain - Lorena Ruiz
Best in Ramp Walk	Mexico - Grecia Novelo
Miss Fashion Icon	Puerto Rico - Sabrina Maria Feliciano
Top Model	Dominican Republic - Esmeilin Tejada Pérez
Best in National Costume	Colombia - Valeria Morales Valero
Best in Evening Gown	Philippines - Anna Margaret Mercado
Eventista Miss Popular Vote	France - Anaïs Holtzmann Miranda
Eventista Best in Swimsuit	Dominican Republic - Esmeilin Tejada Pérez
Eventista Best in National Costume	Dominican Republic - Esmeilin Tejada Pérez

== Contestants ==
Country	Candidate	Hometown
Botswana	Margaret Nashaa	Gaborone
Canada	Jeanae Elisha Ventura	Calgary
Colombia	Valeria Morales Valero	Yopal
Cuba	Amalia Martinez	Isla de la Juventud
Dominican Republic	Esmeilin Tejada Pérez	Espaillat
Fiji	Nikisha Shayali	Suva
France	Anaïs Holtzmann Miranda	Strasbourg
Germany	Laurina Vincentina Indrunas	Frankfurt
India	Kaziah Liz Mejo	Mavelikkara
Japan	Kikyo Sawada	Tokyo
Mexico	Grecia Novelo	San Luis Potosí
Namibia	Elaine Engelbrecht	Windhoek
Netherlands	Liora Smit	Groningen
Paraguay	Florencia González	Paraguarí
Peru	Almendra Limas	Lima
Philippines	Anna Margaret Mercado	Quirino
Puerto Rico	Sabrina Maria Feliciano	San Juan
Romania	Maria Ghise	Bucharest
Spain	Lorena Ruiz	Gran Canaria
Sri Lanka	Tanushi Amaya	Colombo
United States	Alanys Cuevas	Orlando
Venezuela	Tatiana Zambrano Bermudez	Guanare
Vietnam	Nguyễn Thị Xuân Mai	Huế
Zimbabwe	Julie Tungamirai	Harare
