= Miss International 2026 =

64th Miss International beauty pageant

- Date: 25 November 2026
- Venue: Tokyo Dome City Hall, Shibuya, Tokyo, Japan
- Broadcaster: YouTube
- Entrants: 73
- Debuts: Bhutan; Malawi
- Withdrawals: Argentina; Cook Islands; Costa Rica; Denmark; Greece; Honduras; Liberia; Mauritius; Montenegro; Namibia; Nicaragua; Pakistan; Paraguay; Romania; Russia; Tunisia; Zimbabwe
- Returns: Cape Verde; Curaçao; Germany; Guam; Kyrgyzstan; Moldova; Panama; Zambia

Miss International 2026 will be the 64th Miss International pageant, scheduled to be held at the Tokyo Dome City Hall in Shibuya, Tokyo, Japan, on 25 November 2026.

Catalina Duque of Colombia will crown her successor at the end of the event.

== Overview ==
=== Location and date ===
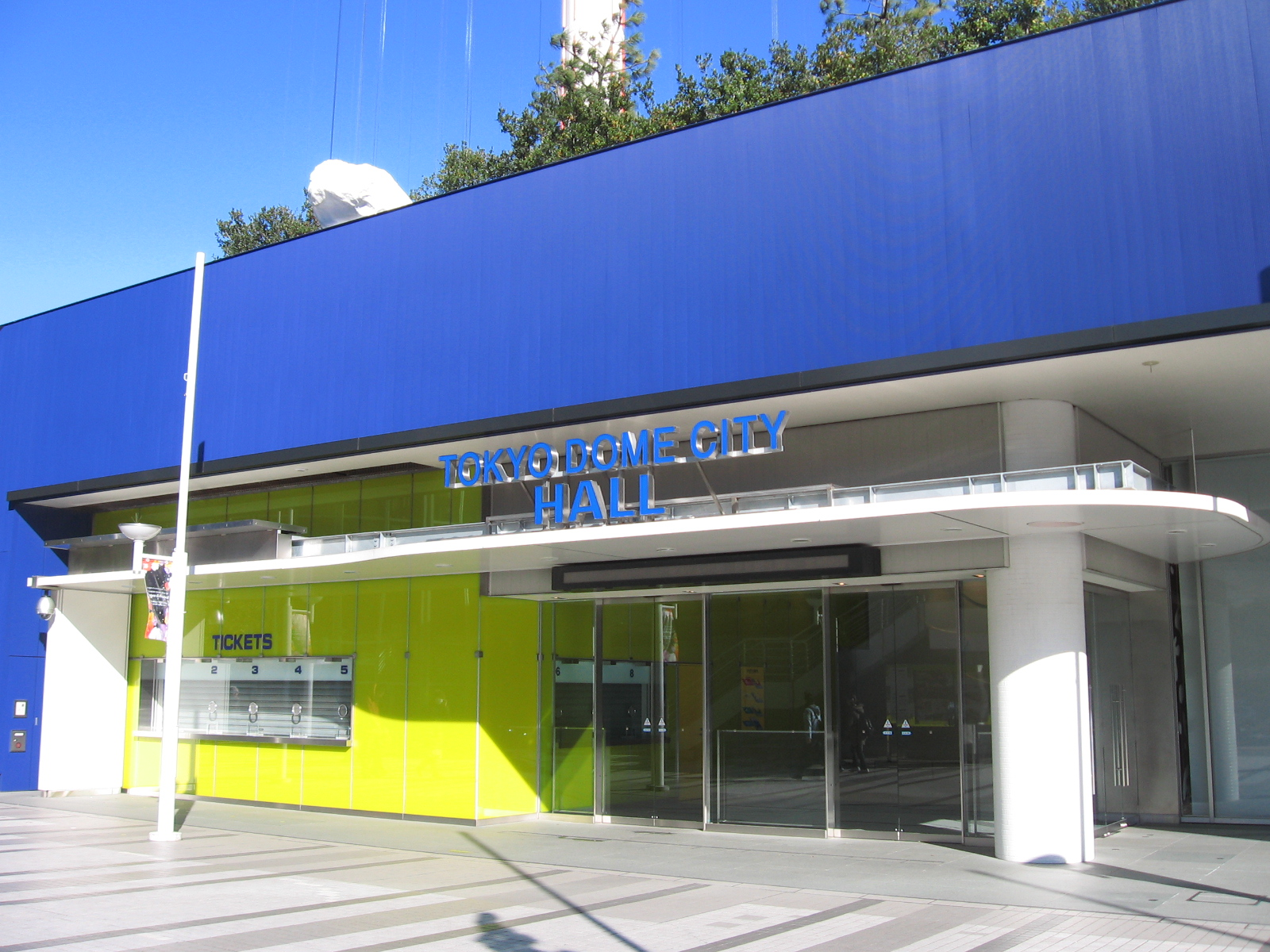
Tokyo Dome City Hall, the venue of the 64th Miss International pageant

On 1 April 2026, the International Culture Association announced that the pageant will be held on 25 November 2026 at the Tokyo Dome City Hall. With the finals taking place hours after Miss Universe 2026, the Philippine Daily Inquirer reported that this scheduling marks the first time the coronation shows of two Big Four beauty pageants are held within hours of each other. The pageant will be livestreamed on the Miss International YouTube channel.

=== Schedules ===
Miss International 2026: Schedule of Activities
Date	Event	Ref.
11 November	Arrival day	
13 November	Opening ceremony	
14 November	National Costume Show	
15–21 November	Japan tour	
22 November	Sustainable Development Goals Presentation	
23 November	Preliminary Evaluation	
25 November	Miss International 2026 Grand Final	

=== Selection of participants ===
Among the delegates, twelve were appointed to the position after being runner-up in their national pageant, (Note: Sajria Proma of Bangladesh was the first runner-up in Miss International Bangladesh 2025. Gioia van de Voorde of Belgium was the second runner-up in Miss Exclusive 2026. Bárbara Wolfenson of Chile was the second runner-up of Miss World Chile 2025. Vaishnavi Ganesh of India was the first runner-up in Miss Universe India 2026. Asia Wright of Jamaica was the first runner-up in Miss Jamaica World 2026. Tina Nkombezi of Malawi was the second runner-up in Miss Malawi 2025. Wenwei Yap of Malaysia was the first runner-up in Miss International Malaysia 2025. Saw La Pyae Won of Myanmar was the third runner-up in Miss Universe Myanmar 2026. Isabelle Dahle of Norway was the first runner-up in Miss Norway 2026. Annie Chen of Taiwan was the first runner-up in Miss Taiwan 2025. Lara Aslan of Turkey was the second runner-up in Miss Universe Turkiye 2026. Khánh Như Lê of Vietnam was the first runner-up in Miss World Vietnam 2025.) sixteen were chosen through a casting process, (Note: Representatives from Bhutan, Cambodia, China, Cuba, Curaçao, El Salvador, Finland, Hawaii, Italy, Macau, Moldova, Panama, Poland, Puerto Rico, Ukraine, and Zambia were each selected through a casting process conducted by their respective organizations.) and four were selected as replacements for the original representatives.

==== Replacements ====
Emily Smith stepped down as Guam's representative and was replaced by Elise Miguel. Paola Michelle Cruz of the Dominican Republic was replaced by Verónica Musri. Allison Sauz of New Zealand was replaced by Sophie Pardington for unknown reasons. Karenza De Leon of Australia was replaced by Kajol Chand.

==== Debuts, returns and withdrawals ====
This edition will mark the debuts of Bhutan and Malawi. Returning countries and territories for this edition included Curaçao, which last competed in 2018; Guam and Zambia in 2019; Germany in 2022; and Cape Verde, Kyrgyzstan, Moldova and Panama in 2024.

Maria Apostolaki of Greece, Annette Christiansen of Honduras, and Ruvimbo Njomboro of Zimbabwe, withdrew for undisclosed reasons. Bárbara Vázquez of Paraguay was subsequently replaced by Verónica Campos. However, Campos later withdrew from the competition.

==== Did not compete ====
Jeanne Afandonougbo of Togo withdrew from the competition for unknown reasons.

== Results ==
=== Special awards ===
Award	Contestant
Miss Visit Japan	Philippines – Katrina Johnson

== Pageants ==
=== Format ===
This edition featured changes in the format, replacing the swimsuit competition with a sportswear segment, placing greater emphasis on on-stage interviews and the candidates' projects aligned with the Sustainable Development Goals, reducing the significance of the evening gown segment, and discontinuing the Continental Queens selection.

== Contestants ==
The confirmed contestants are as follows:

Country/Territory	Contestant	Age (Note: Ages at the time of the pageant)	Hometown	Ref.
Albania	Alessia Surreli	20	Tirana	
Angola	Catarina Alves	22	Ícolo e Bengo	
Australia	Kajol Chand	24	Eastern Creek	
Bangladesh	Sajria Proma	25	Bogra	
Belgium	Gioia van de Voorde	22	Lichtervelde	
Bhutan	Jo An Ma	28	Hong Kong	
Bolivia	Kaori Fernández	27	La Paz	
Brazil	Nicolle Steinhauser	23	Blumenau	
Cambodia	Kimleang Sokea	28	Phnom Penh	
Canada	Marina Saleeb	27	Toronto	
Cape Verde	Félicia Borges	25	Santiago	
Chile	Bárbara Wolfenson	26	Valparaíso	
China	Kunyu Shi	24	Shanghai	
Colombia	Tutu Mosquera	26	Cali	
Cuba	Rachel Chang	28	Havana	
Curaçao	Samiah Booi	28	Willemstad	
Czech Republic	Laura Glozarová	19	Prague	
Dominican Republic	Verónica Musri	20	Santiago de los Caballeros	
Ecuador	Gisselle Rosales	23	Machala	
El Salvador	Georgina Muñoz	24	San Salvador	
Ethiopia	Betty Degefu	20	Addis Ababa	
Finland	Jenni Karjalainen	23	Posio	
France	Léna Vairac	26	Porcelette	
Germany	Marlene Jose	23	Neu-Ulm	
Ghana	Christabel Lamptey	24	Accra	
Guam	Elise Miguel	21	Tumon	
Guatemala	Melina Birk	27	Quetzaltenango	
Hawaii	Nicole Sakaguchi	27	Honolulu	
Hong Kong	Clarisse Achard	25	Hong Kong	
India	Vaishnavi Ganesh	25	Bengaluru	
Indonesia	Victoria Kosasie	26	Badung	
Italy	Simona Fruttauro	24	Naples	
Jamaica	Asia Wright	21	Saint Thomas	
Japan	Michiru Yakuwa	26	Yamagata	
Kenya	Wilkister Chepkoech	25	Nandi	
Kyrgyzstan	Siuzana Chyngyzbekovna	21	Tashkent	
Macau	Ariel Tan	25	Macau	
Malawi	Tina Nkombezi	26	Blantyre	
Malaysia	Wenwei Yap	28	Kelantan	
Malta	Nikole Buhagiar	18	Floriana	
Mexico	Valeria Espinoza	25	Colima	
Moldova	Elizaveta Kuznetsova	26	Tiraspol	
Mongolia	Khuslen Shirendev	24	Zavkhan	
Myanmar	Saw La Pyae Won	24	Sittwe	
Nepal	Arya Nishaant	24	Lalitpur	
Netherlands	Isabel Soleil	26	Swifterbant	
New Zealand	Sophie Pardington	22	Torbay	
Nigeria	Damilola Bolarinde	28	Lagos	
Norway	Isabelle Dahle	22	Heggedal	
Panama	Carmen Quintero	24	Puerto Armuelles	
Peru	Valentina Andreón	20	Trujillo	
Philippines	Katrina Johnson	28	Davao City	
Poland	Savannah Gajda	26	Gdańsk	
Portugal	Lisandra Gonçalves	20	Madeira	
Puerto Rico	Paola Martínez	26	Dorado	
Réunion	Lauriane Lebon	27	Saint-Joseph	
Singapore	Janessa Yang	24	Singapore	
South Africa	Joey Roman	23	Kuils River	
South Korea	Su-yeon Jang	19	Seoul	
Spain	Laura Dowell	25	El Puerto	
Sri Lanka	Tiffany Wijepala	28	Colombo	
Taiwan	Hsin-Hui Chen	21	Taipei	
Tanzania	Agape Anthony	27	Dar es Salaam	
Thailand	Lalana Siribunyakul	20	Bangkok	
Turkey	Lara Aslan	22	Istanbul	
Turks and Caicos Islands	Adesha Gustave	19	Cockburn Town	
Ukraine	Daria Kharytonova	23	Kyiv	
United Kingdom	Brittany Feeney	28	Liverpool	
United States	Maddie McGuire	21	El Paso	
United States Virgin Islands	Alejandra Ranaudo	23	Key Biscayne	
Venezuela	Valeria di Martino	21	Maracaibo	
Vietnam	Khánh Như Lê	22	Khánh Hòa	
Zambia	Faith Mukonko	28	Kitwe	
