= Kaziah Mejo =

Indian beauty pageant titleholder (born 2007)

- Kaziah in 2026
- Born: 17 April 2007 (age 19); Abu Dhabi, United Arab Emirates
- Education: Manipal Academy of Higher Education
- Occupation: Model
- Beauty pageant titleholder
- Title: Miss Universe India 2026
- Major competitions: Miss Teen Diva 2024; (Winner); Miss Teen International 2025; (1st Runner-Up); Miss Universe India 2026; (Winner); Miss Universe 2026; (TBD)

Kaziah Liz Mejo (born 17 April 2007) is an Indian beauty pageant titleholder who won Miss Universe India 2026. She will represent India at Miss Universe 2026 in San Juan, Puerto Rico.

Earlier in her pageantry career, she won Miss Teen Diva 2024 and was crowned Miss Teen International India 2024. She represented India at Miss Teen International 2025, where she finished as first runner-up.

== Early life and education ==
Kaziah Liz Mejo was born in Abu Dhabi, United Arab Emirates in a Malayali family originally from Mavelikkara in a Mar Thoma Syrian Christian family. During her schooling in Abu Dhabi, she attended Emirates National School, St. Joseph's and Abu Dhabi Indian School.

Mejo studied at St. Joseph's School during her teenage years and was described as a professional model and trained classical dancer. She also received training in violin, drums, singing and karate.

As of 2026, she is pursuing law studies from Manipal Academy of Higher Education, Bengaluru.

== Pageantry ==
=== Miss Teen Diva ===
Mejo competed in Miss Teen Diva 2024, a pageant organised by the Glamanand Group. The competition was held on 17 April 2024 at Zee Studios in Jaipur. She won the title and was crowned Miss Teen International India 2024, becoming the Indian representative to Miss Teen International 2025.

During the competition, she also received the Best in Evening Gown and Revlon Iconic Lips subsidiary titles.

=== Miss Teen International 2025 ===
Mejo represented India at Miss Teen International 2025, held in Jaipur on 31 August 2025. The competition featured contestants from 24 countries. Spain's Lorena Ruiz won the title, while Mejo finished as first runner-up.

=== Miss Universe India 2026 ===
In 2026, Mejo was crowned Miss Universe Kerala and became the state's representative at the national Miss Universe India competition. Mejo represented Kerala in the third edition of Miss Universe India. The national final was held on 23 August 2026 at Zee Studios in Jaipur. 52 contestants competed in the event.

Mejo won the title and was crowned by her predecessor, Manika Vishwakarma. She became the first winner of the Miss Universe India title from Kerala. Vaishnavi Ganesh of Tamil Nadu was the 1st runner-up, followed by Anushri Satavlekar of Gujarat, Tejaswini Shrivastava of Maharashtra and Anubha Vashisth of Uttarakhand in the remaining runner-up positions.

=== Miss Universe 2026 ===
As Miss Universe India 2026, Mejo is set to represent India at Miss Universe 2026. The final is scheduled to take place on 24 November 2026 at the José Miguel Agrelot Coliseum in San Juan, Puerto Rico.

Awards and achievements
Preceded by Manika Vishwakarma	Miss Universe India; 2026	Incumbent
