= Miss Teen International 2024 =

- Date: July 7, 2024
- Presenters: Lance Raymundo; Ngô Ngọc Gia Hân
- Venue: Zee Studios, Jaipur, India
- Entrants: 28
- Placements: 15
- Debuts: Bangladesh; England; Fiji; Germany; Japan; Lithuania; South Africa; Spain; Uganda
- Withdrawals: Canada; Laos; Malaysia; Nigeria
- Returns: Brazil; United States; Zimbabwe
- Winner: Muyleang Ly; Cambodia

Miss Teen International 2024 was the 5th edition of the Miss Teen International pageant. It was held on July 7, 2024, in Zee Studios, Jaipur, India. 28 contestants from around the world participated in the pageant. The show was hosted by Filipino actor and model Lance Raymundo and Ngô Ngọc Gia Hân, Miss Teen International 2022 from Vietnam. It was broadcast live on Glamanand's official YouTube channel.

At the end of the event, Bárbara Párraga of Venezuela crowned Muyleang Ly of Cambodia as her successor.

== Final results ==
Placement	Candidate
Miss Teen International 2024	Cambodia — Muyleang Ly ☆
1st Runner-Up	Cuba - Anette Marrero
2nd Runner-Up	Namibia - Oriana Ribeiro
3rd Runner-Up	Botswana - Onkatlile Koolatotse §
4th Runner-Up	Mexico - Regina Gonzalez
Top 8	India - Sejal Gupta ‡; Indonesia - Zahra Khairunnisa Setiawan; United States - Morgan Brooke Greco
Top 15	Dominican Republic - Delylah Sophia Tineo; Germany - Aylin Kart; Mongolia - Solongo Jargalsaikhan; Netherlands - Mevy Lumamuly; Spain - Camila Gomes Garcia; Venezuela - Maria Rondon; Zimbabwe - Lothando Owami Ndlovu

§ – Voted into the Top 8 by the viewers and awarded as Miss Popular Vote
‡ – Got into the Top 8 by being awarded as Beauty with a Purpose
☆ – Voted into the Top 15 by the viewers and awarded as Miss Multimedia

=== Special awards ===
Position	Contestant
Best in Swimsuit	Dominican Republic - Delylah Sophia Tineo
Top Model	Spain - Camila Gomes Garcia
Miss Fashion Icon	Cambodia - Muyleang Ly
Best in Personal Interview	Cuba - Annette Marrero
Beauty with a Purpose	India - Sejal Gupta
Best in Ramp Walk	Cambodia - Muyleang Ly
Best in Evening Gown	Mexico - Regina Gonzalez
Miss Multimedia	Cambodia - Muyleang Ly
Miss Popular Vote	Botswana - Onkatlile Koolatotse
Eventista Best in National Costume	Botswana - Onkatlile Koolatotse
Best in Introduction Video	Bangladesh - Easter Sonia Roy

== Contestants ==
Country	Candidate	Hometown
Bangladesh	Easter Sonia Roy	Dhaka
Brazil	Isabelle Rodríguez	Paraná
Botswana	Onkatlile Koolatotse	Gaborone
Cambodia	Muyleang Ly	Phnom Penh
Cuba	Anette Marrero	Miami
Dominican Republic	Delylah Sophia Tineo	Trenton
England	Mia Risco	Rotherham
Fiji	Saachi Kumar	Suva
Germany	Aylin Kart	Stuttgart
India	Sejal Gupta	Chandigarh
Indonesia	Zahra Khairunnisa Setiawan	Samarinda
Japan	Mika Arai	Tokyo
Lithuania	Gabija Soinskaite	Vilnius
Mexico	Regina Gonzalez	Quintana Roo
Mongolia	Solongo Jargalsaikhan	Ulaanbaatar
Namibia	Oriana Ribeiro	Windhoek
Nepal	Aarohi Adhikari	Kathmandu
Netherlands	Mevy Lumamuly	Zwolle
Philippines	Raveena Co Mansukhani	Tagaytay
South Africa	Silindile Mabaso	Durban
Spain	Camila Gomes Garcia	Tenerife
Sri Lanka	Surali Laneshika	Colombo
Thailand	Warisara Riebpradit	Phuket
Uganda	Almorie Nagayi	Kampala
United States	Morgan Brooke Greco	Seattle
Venezuela	Maria Rondon	Aragua
Vietnam	Bùi Le Uyen	Khánh Hòa
Zimbabwe	Lothando Owami Ndlovu	Harare
