= Vaishnavi Ganesh =

Indian beauty pageant titleholder (born 2001)

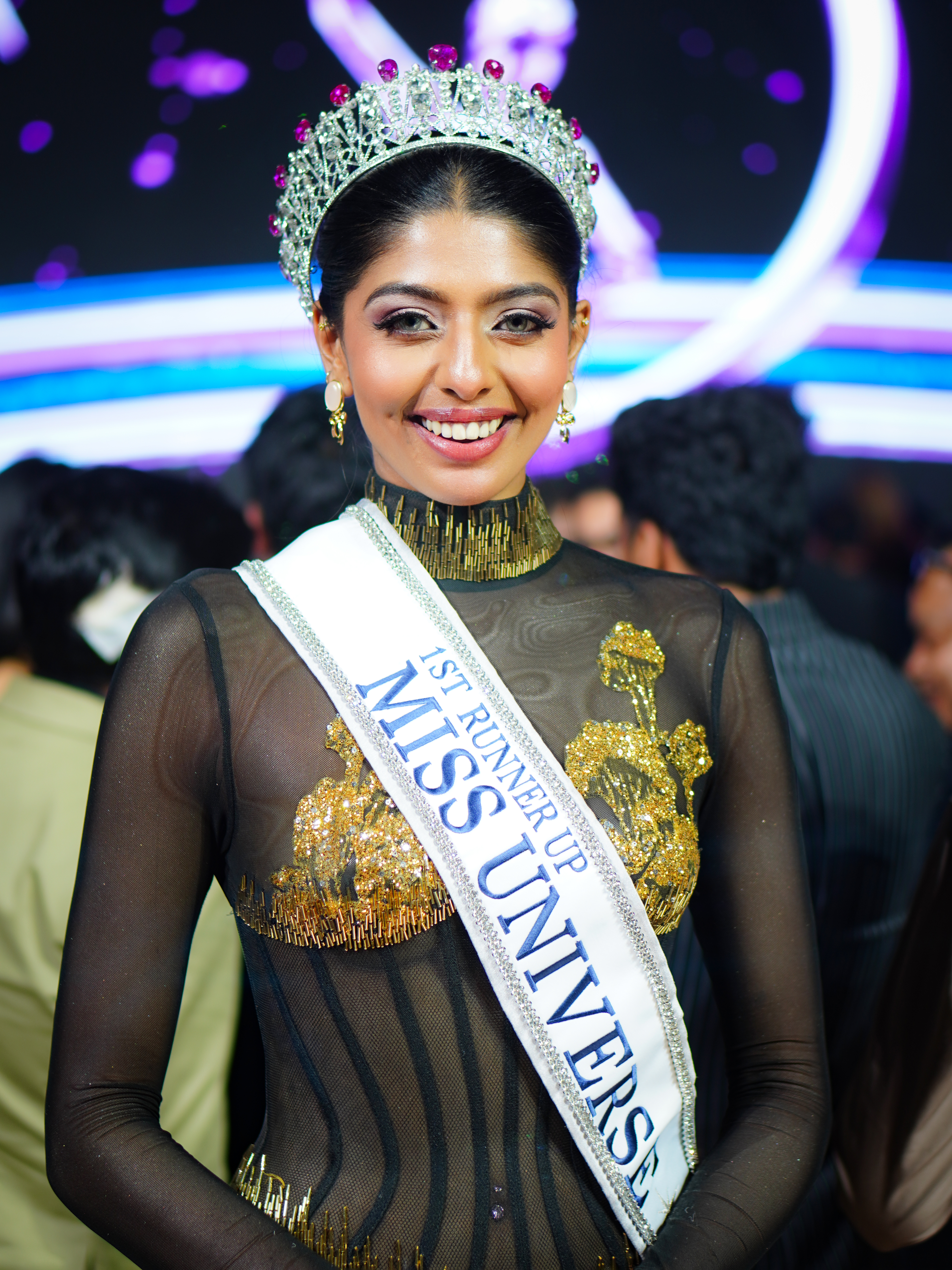
- Vaishnavi Ganesh at Miss Universe India 2026
- Born: Bengaluru, Karnataka
- Occupation: Model
- Beauty pageant titleholder
- Title: Miss International India 2026
- Major competitions: Miss Diva 2020; (Top 10); Miss Universe Tamil Nadu 2026; (Winner); Miss Universe India 2026; (Miss International India 2026); Miss International 2026; (TBD)

Vaishnavi Gannesh is an Indian beauty pageant titleholder who was named Miss International India 2026. She represented Tamil Nadu at Miss Universe India 2026, where she was the first runner-up.

She was then crowned the Miss International India title following the competition and is set to represent India at Miss International 2026.

== Pageantry ==
=== LIVA Miss Diva 2020 ===
Ganesh competed in Miss Diva 2020 under the LIVA Miss Diva branding. She was among the finalists selected at the Bengaluru auditions and was subsequently selected through the competition's wildcard process.

In February 2020, Ganesh won the LIVA Miss Diva 2020 wildcard contest, securing a place among the final 20 contestants in the national competition.

At the LIVA Miss Diva 2020 grand finale, Ganesh advanced to the Top 10. The competition was won by Adline Castelino, with Neha Jaiswal as runner-up and Aavriti Choudhary as the second titleholder representing India at an international pageant.

=== Miss Universe India 2026 ===
Ganesh represented Tamil Nadu at Miss Universe India 2026. She finished as the first runner-up in the competition, which was held in Jaipur, Rajasthan, on 23 August 2026. The competition featured 52 contestants, with Kaziah Liz Mejo of Kerala winning the title.

Ganesh was then crowned as Miss International India 2026 and is scheduled to represent India at Miss International 2026.

=== Miss International 2026 ===
As Miss International India 2026, Gannesh is scheduled to represent India at Miss International 2026 to be held on 25 November 2026 in Tokyo Dome City Hall, Shibuya, Tokyo, Japan.

Awards and achievements
Preceded by Roosh Sindhu	Miss International India; 2026	Incumbent
