= Roosh Sindhu =

Indian beauty pageant titleholder

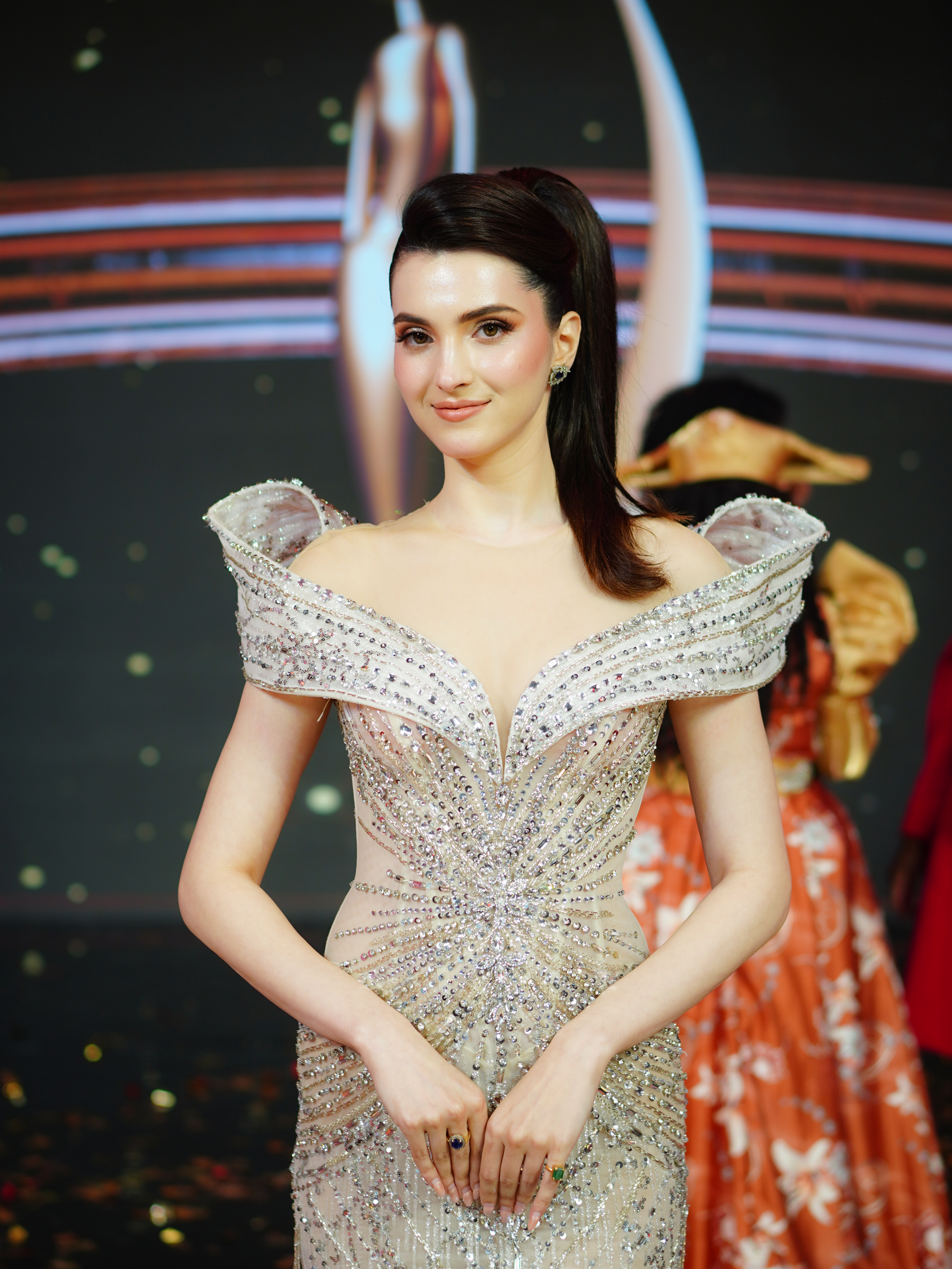
- Roosh Sindhu at Miss Teen International 2026
- Born: Nagpur, Maharashtra, India
- Education: Journalism; Fashion Design
- Occupations: Model, beauty pageant titleholder, author, speaker
- Known for: Miss International India 2025
- Awards: 1st place in the preliminary Evening Gown round 8th place in the preliminary Swimsuit round 3rd overall in the preliminary scoring among 80 contestants

Roosh Sindhu is an Indian beauty pagent tittleholder and model who was crowned Miss India International 2025 in Jaipur on 18 August 2025. She represented India at the Miss international 2025 Pagent, held on 27 November 2025, where she achieved a placement for India after a 13 - year absence from the pageant's placements.

== Early life ==
Sindhu holds a degree in Journalism and a Fashion Design certification from Inter National Institute of Fashion Design, and was selected as a student designer at New York Fashion Week in 2019. She has also worked in international marketing.

== Pageantry ==
=== Miss Universe India 2024 ===
In 2024, Sindhu won Miss Universe Gujarat and represented the state at Miss Universe India 2024, held on 22 September in Jaipur. Although unplaced in the final competition, she received the awards of Miss Beautiful Skin and Best in Personal Interview.

=== Miss Universe India 2025 ===
On 20 June 2025, Sindhu was announced as a national finalist for Miss Universe India 2025 as a wildcard entrant during the final audition event held in Delhi. At the grand finale on 18 August 2025, she reached the top six and was crowned Miss International India 2025. During the competition, she received awards for Best National Costume, Miss Photogenic, and Miss Glowing Skin.

=== Miss International 2025 ===
Sindhu represented India at Miss International 2025, on 27 November 2025 in Tokyo, Japan. She reached the top 20. This is India's first placement since 2012.

Awards and achievements
Preceded by Rashmi Shinde	Miss International India; 2025	Succeeded by Vaishnavi Ganesh
