= Miss Universe India 2024 =

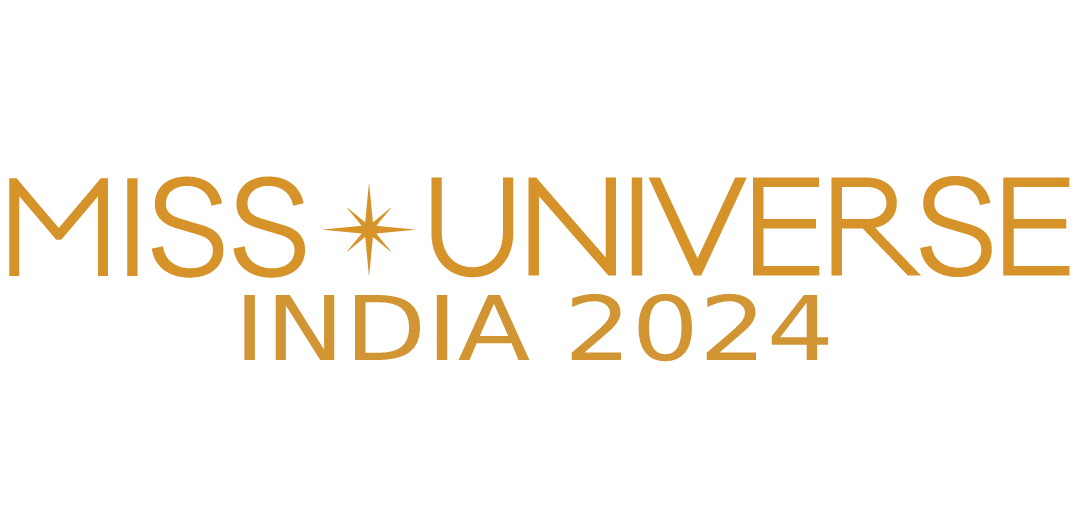
- Date: 22 September 2024
- Presenters: Lance Raymundo; Ngô Ngọc Gia Hân
- Venue: Zee Studios, Jaipur, India
- Broadcaster: Zee TV
- Entrants: 51
- Placements: 20
- Withdrawals: Jammu and Kashmir; Telangana
- Winner: Rhea Singha; Gujarat
- Congeniality: Saanvi Sharma; Uttar Pradesh
- Best National Costume: Chhavi Verg; New Jersey; Danube Kangjam; Manipur
- Photogenic: Kajal Choudhary; Bihar

Miss Universe India 2024 was the inaugural edition of the Miss Universe India pageant, held at the Zee Studios in Jaipur, India, on September 22, 2024. The pageant is held under the Glamanand Group, with Nikhil Anand as the National Director.

At the end of the event, Rhea Singha was crowned as Miss Universe India 2024 by Urvashi Rautela, Miss Universe India 2015. She will represent India at the Miss Universe 2024 to be held in Mexico on November 16, 2024.

The Miss Universe India 2024 pageant was held from September 9th to 22nd, with the grand finale took place in Zee Studios, Jaipur, Rajasthan. Filipino actor and model, Lance Raymundo and Ngô Ngọc Gia Hân, winner of Miss Teen International 2022 hosted the coronation ceremony, which was aired live on the official YouTube channel of Miss Universe.

== Results ==
=== Placements ===
Placement	Contestant	International Placement
Miss Universe India 2024	MUI. #36 – Rhea Singha	Top 30 – Miss Universe 2024
1st Runner-Up	MUI. #34 – Pranjal Priya	
2nd Runner-Up	MUI. #16 – Chhavi Verg	
3rd Runner-Up	MUI. #47 – Sushmita Roy	
4th Runner-Up	MUI. #39 – Ruopfüzhano Whiso	
Top 10	MUI. #06 – Anjum Malik; MUI. #10 – Archana Bhavsar; MUI. #17 – Daisy Khound; MUI. #28 – Mrunmayee Taare ∆; MUI. #32 – Ojasvi Sharma	
Top 20	MUI. #05 – Angel Bhathal; MUI. #07 – Anubha Vashist Chaudhary; MUI. #14 – Chandana Jayaram; MUI. #27 – Manika Vishwakarma; MUI. #33 – Prakshi Goel; MUI. #37 – Roneihpuii §; MUI. #41 – Saanvi Sharma; MUI. #42 – Sanjana Vij; MUI. #49 – Tejaswini Shrivastava; MUI. #51 – Wachi Pareek	

§ – Voted into the Top 20 by winning Miss Popular Award
∆ – Winner of Beauty with a Purpose Award

=== Special awards ===
Award	Contestant
Beauty with a Purpose	MUI. #28 – Mrunmayee Taare
Best in Evening Gown	MUI. #07 – Anubha Vashist Chaudhary
Best in Personal Interview	MUI. #38 – Roosh Sindhu
Best in Swimsuit	MUI. #34 – Pranjal Priya
Best National Costume (Judges Choice)	MUI. #16 – Chhavi Verg
Best National Costume (People's Choice)	MUI. #18 – Danube Kangjam
Best State Director	Hemamalini Rajinikanth – Tamil Nadu
Miss Beautiful Skin	MUI. #38 – Roosh Sindhu
Miss Congeniality	MUI. #41 – Saanvi Sharma
Miss Fashion Icon	MUI. #22 – Kanak Agnihotri
Miss Photogenic	MUI. #21 – Kajal Choudhary
Miss Popular	MUI. #37 – Roneihpuii
MyGlamm Miss Glamorous	MUI. #36 – Rhea Singha

==== Best Rampwalk ====
Result	Name
Winner	Pranjal Priya
Top 5	Anamika Borah; Daisy Khound; Ojasvi Sharma; Wachi Pareek

==== Best in Speech ====
Result	Name
Winner	Saanvi Sharma
Top 5	Angel Bhathal; Daisy Khound; Manika Suthar; Saachi Gurav

==== Best in Talent ====
Result	Name
Top 5	Avani Kakekochhi; Chayanika Debnath; Chhavi Verg; Navya Singh; Tejaswini Shrivastava

== Background ==
=== Schedule ===
The Miss Universe India organization officially unveiled the competition schedule for the Miss Universe India 2024 pageant on September 1, 2024 via its official social media handles. The event will commence on September 9 and culminate in a grand finale on September 22. The National Costume and Preliminary rounds are slated for 20 September 2024.

=== Selection of participants ===
In early May, National Director Nikhil Anand announced on social media that contestants would be selected from each Indian state. Prominent figures from the business world and many beauty queens acquired franchises for various states.

Applications for contestants at the Miss Universe state level subsequently opened. Each state will independently conduct auditions, grooming sessions, styling sessions, training, and finalize their representative. The pageant announced that all women aged 18 and above will be eligible to compete. This reflected the Miss Universe organisation's changes to their eligibility criteria. Once all state representatives are announced, they will compete for the title of Miss Universe India at the grand finale, expected to be held in October 2024. Contestants from all Indian states and an Indian representative from the UAE will compete in the pageant.

A final round of auditions for Miss Universe Delhi 2024 was held in New Delhi on August 17th. The event was open to all girls who had missed the online registration or failed to win their respective state competitions. Spot registrations were also accepted between 10 AM and 12 PM IST. The contestants underwent multiple rounds of interviews, with participants who had achieved runner-up or finalist titles at state-level pageants being particularly encouraged to audition. At the end of the day, Sanjana Vij was crowned Miss Universe Delhi 2024. Notably, she had previously been the first runner-up at the Miss Universe Telangana 2024 pageant. Additionally, the event marked the official announcement of Miss Universe India representatives for the states of Chhattisgarh, Himachal Pradesh, Odisha, and Tripura. Several contestants were chosen as wildcard entries to advance to the national finals.

==== Replacements ====
- Jammu and Kashmir: Priyanka Pandita, the former Miss Universe Jammu and Kashmir 2024, stepped down from her title due to work commitments. Aishwarya Pansare was subsequently crowned the new Miss Universe Jammu and Kashmir 2024.
- Odisha: Allegations of favoritism marred the Miss Universe Odisha finale. Following an investigation into the questionable crowning of the original winner, the organization revoked her title and suspended the state's license. Janvi Soni was ultimately declared the rightful Miss Universe Odisha at the national audition on 17 August 2024.
- Haryana: A pre-existing agency contract prevented Amishi Kaushik, the original Miss Universe Haryana 2024, from participating in the national pageant. As a result, the first runner-up, Prakshi Goyal, was selected to represent Haryana.

==== Withdrawals ====
- Miss Universe Telangana 2024, Niharika Sood, announced her withdrawal from the competition on September 20th due to contractual obligations.
- Miss Universe Jammu and Kashmir 2024, Aishwarya Pansare, withdrew from the competition on the day before the finals, citing undisclosed reasons.

=== Selection Committee ===
==== Coronation Day ====
- Nikhil Anand – National director of Miss Universe India
- Nguyễn Như Quỳnh – CEO of Miss Tourism World Vietnam
- Rajiv K Shrivastava – Founder of Act Now Organisation
- Rian Fernandez Atelier – Filipino fashion designer
- Urvashi Rautela – Actress and Miss Universe India 2015

==== Preliminary Competition ====
- Nikhil Anand – National director of Miss Universe India
- Simran Sharma – Miss Grand India 2020
- Sophiya Singh – Miss Asia Pacific International India 2024

== Contestants ==
The Miss Universe India 2024 pageant features 51 contestants: 31 state representatives, 14 wildcard entries, and 6 NRI delegates.

No.	Delegate	Age (Note: Ages at the time of the pageant.)	Height	State/Territory/Country	Audition Category	Ref.
~~1~~	~~Aishwarya Pansare~~			~~Jammu and Kashmir~~	State	
1	Amelia Reddy	23	173 cm (5 ft 8 in)	North Carolina	NRI	
3	Anamika Borah	22	163 cm (5 ft 4 in)	Assam	State	
4	Ananya Saxena	23	177 cm (5 ft 9 1/2 in)	Uttarakhand	State	
5	Angel Bhathal	38	165 cm (5 ft 5 in)	Toronto	NRI	
6	Anjum Malik	27	163 cm (5 ft 4 in)	Goa	State	
7	Anubha Vashist Chaudhary	27	173 cm (5 ft 8 in)	Delhi	Wildcard	
8	Anushka Dutta	22	177 cm (5 ft 9 1/2 in)	Himachal Pradesh	State	
9	Aqsa Varghese	24	162 cm (5 ft 4 in)	Kerala	State	
10	Archana Bhavsar	23	175 cm (5 ft 9 in)	Mumbai	Wildcard	
11	Avani Kakekochhi Bhat	24	169 cm (5 ft 6 1/2 in)	Karnataka	State	
12	Bahun Nongrum	26	171 cm (5 ft 7 1/2 in)	Meghalaya	State	
13	Bhuvaneshwari Vishwanath	25	165 cm (5 ft 5 in)	Coimbatore	Wildcard	
14	Chandana Jayaram	24	170 cm (5 ft 7 in)	Andhra Pradesh	State	
15	Chayanika Debnath	29	160 cm (5 ft 3 in)	Tripura	State	
16	Chhavi Verg	27	175 cm (5 ft 9 in)	New Jersey	NRI	
17	Daisy Khound	23	175 cm (5 ft 9 in)	Assam	Wildcard	
18	Danube Kangjam	24	173 cm (5 ft 8 in)	Manipur	State	
19	Guneet Kaur Saini	25	174 cm (5 ft 8 1/2 in)	Punjab	State	
20	Janvi Soni	23	164 cm (5 ft 4 1/2 in)	Odisha	State	
21	Kajal Choudhary	22	173 cm (5 ft 8 in)	Bihar	State	
22	Kanak Agnihotri	25	165 cm (5 ft 5 in)	Uttar Pradesh	State	
23	Khushi Verma	18	172 cm (5 ft 7 1/2 in)	New Delhi	Wildcard	
24	Kopal Mandloi	25	165 cm (5 ft 5 in)	Madhya Pradesh	State	
25	Lakshitha Thilagaraj	20	175 cm (5 ft 9 in)	Tamil Nadu	State	
26	Larissa Dsouza	24	175 cm (5 ft 9 in)	United Arab Emirates	NRI	
27	Manika Vishwakarma	21	171 cm (5 ft 7 1/2 in)	Rajasthan	State	
28	Mrunmayee Taare	23	178 cm (5 ft 10 in)	Thane	Wildcard	
29	Namitha Marimuthu	35	182 cm (5 ft 11 1/2 in)	Chennai	Wildcard	
30	Navya Singh	34	173 cm (5 ft 8 in)	Katihar	Wildcard	
31	~~Niharika Sood~~	~~27~~	~~167 cm (5 ft 5 1/2 in)~~	~~Telangana~~	State	
32	Ojasvi Sharma	22	170 cm (5 ft 7 in)	Delhi	Wildcard	
33	Prakshi Goel	23	174 cm (5 ft 8 1/2 in)	Haryana	State	
34	Pranjal Priya	19	179 cm (5 ft 10 1/2 in)	Maharashtra	State	
35	Rashalika Sabharwal	29	171 cm (5 ft 7 1/2 in)	Mumbai	Wildcard	
36	Rhea Singha	19	170 cm (5 ft 7 in)	Ahmedabad	Wildcard	
37	Roneihpuii	23	170 cm (5 ft 7 in)	Mizoram	State	
38	Roosh Sindhu	21	171 cm (5 ft 7 1/2 in)	Gujarat	State	
39	Ruopfüzhano Whiso	25	171 cm (5 ft 7 1/2 in)	Nagaland	State	
40	Saachi Gurav	22	178 cm (5 ft 10 in)	Manchester	NRI	
41	Saanvi Sharma	22	163 cm (5 ft 4 in)	Uttar Pradesh	State	
42	Sanjana Vij	29	167 cm (5 ft 5 1/2 in)	Delhi	State	
43	Shaine Soni	37	179 cm (5 ft 10 1/2 in)	Delhi	Wildcard	
44	Shatakshi Kiran	23	170 cm (5 ft 7 in)	Jharkhand	State	
45	Shivali Patel	27	171 cm (5 ft 7 1/2 in)	Raleigh	NRI	
46	Sonia Pradhan	20	165 cm (5 ft 5 in)	Sikkim	State	
47	Sushmita Roy	29	175 cm (5 ft 9 in)	West Bengal	State	
48	Tanu Shree	26	175 cm (5 ft 9 in)	Bihar	Wildcard	
49	Tejaswini Shrivastava	22	167 cm (5 ft 5 1/2 in)	Nagpur	Wildcard	
50	Thupten Lhamu	23	165 cm (5 ft 5 in)	Arunachal Pradesh	State	
51	Wachi Pareek	22	166 cm (5 ft 5 1/2 in)	Chhattisgarh	State	

== Crossovers ==
Contestants who previously competed in other national and international beauty pageants with their respective placements.

=== National Pageants ===
Femina Miss India (Miss World India)

- FMI Nagaland 2018: Ruopfüzhano Whiso
- FMI Telangana 2019: Sanjana Vij (Runner-up)
- FMI West Bengal 2019: Sushmita Roy
- FMI Tripura 2020: Chayanika Debnath
- FMI Bihar 2022: Kajal Choudhary
- FMI New Delhi 2022: Prakshi Goel
- FMI Bihar 2023: Tanu Shree
- FMI Odisha 2023: Janvi Soni

Miss Diva (Miss Universe India)

- 2020: Rashalika Sabharwal
- 2022: Ojasvi Sharma (Miss Popular Choice Winner)
- 2023: Archana Bhavsar
- 2023: Daisy Khound (Top 7)
- 2025: Avani Kakekochhi (Miss Diva Supranational 2026)

Miss Divine Beauty (Miss Earth India)

- 2019: Ananya Saxena
- 2021: Kanak Agnihotri (Top 15)
- 2023: Tejaswini Shrivastava (1st Runner-up)

Miss Transqueen India (Miss International Queen India)

- 2021: Shaine Soni (Winner)
- 2022: Namitha Marimuthu (Winner)

Miss Grand India (Miss Grand International India)

- 2024: Guneetinder Kaur
- 2024: Kopal Mandloi
- 2025:Lakshitha Thilagaraj(Winner)

Miss USA (Miss Universe USA)

- 2017: Chhavi Verg (1st Runner-up)

Miss Supranational USA

- 2021: Shivali Patel (Winner)

Miss World America

- 2016: Shivali Patel (1st Runner-up)
- 2018: Shivali Patel (2nd Runner-up)

Miss World Canada

- 2010: Angel Bhathal (Top 12)

Miss Earth Canada

- 2012: Angel Bhathal (2nd Runner-Up)

Miss Universe Canada

- 2013: Angel Bhathal (Top 20)

Miss Swimsuit USA International CANADA

- 2022: Angel Bhathal (Winner)

=== International Pageants ===
Miss Teen Universe

- 2022: Wachi Pareek (2nd Runner-up)
- 2023: Rhea Singha (Top 6)

Miss Global

- 2019: Angel Bhathal (Top 10)
- 2021: Larissa Dsouza

Miss Supranational

- 2021: Shivali Patel (Represented United States)

Miss International Queen

- 2022: Namitha Marimuthu (Top 11)

Dr. World

- 2021: Angel Bhathal (Winner)

Miss Multiverse

- 2021: Angel Bhathal (6th Runner-Up)

Miss Cappaddoccia

- 2022: Angel Bhathal (Winner)

Miss Swimsuit USA International

- 2024: Angel Bhathal (2nd Runner-Up)
- 2025: Angel Bhathal (Winner)

Miss Teen Earth

- 2023: Rhea Singha (Winner)
