= GLS University =

Private university in Ahmedabad, Gujarat, India

- Motto: Learn Love Serve
- Type: Private
- Established: 2015
- Parent institution: Gujarat Law Society
- Affiliations: UGC
- President: Sudhir Nanavati
- Director: Chandni Kapadia
- Location: Ahmedabad, Gujarat, India
- Language: English
- Website: www.glsuniversity.ac.in

GLS University is a private university located in Ahmedabad, Gujarat, India. The university was established in 2015 by the Gujarat Law Society (GLS) through The Gujarat Private Universities (Amendment) Act, 2015.
