= Miss Teen International 2026 =

- Date: August 31, 2026
- Venue: Zee Studios, Jaipur, India
- Entrants: 33
- Placements: 18
- Debuts: Czech Republic; Miss Teen International Latina; Latvia; Myanmar; New Zealand; Panama; Russia; Suriname; United States Virgin Islands
- Returns: Brazil; Cambodia; Indonesia; Nepal; Nigeria; Serbia
- Winner: Jhoanna Uranga; Cuba

Miss Teen International 2026 was the 7th edition of the Miss Teen International pageant. It was held on August 31, 2026, in Zee Studios, Jaipur, India. 31 contestants from around the world participated in the pageant. It was broadcast on Glamanand's official YouTube channel.

At the end of the event, Lorena Ruiz of Spain crowned Jhoanna Uranga of Cuba as her successor. She became the first ever girl from Cuba to win the pageant

== Final results ==
Placement	Candidate
Miss Teen International 2026	Cuba - Jhoanna Uranga
1st Runner-Up	Namibia - Chantal Boeren
2nd Runner-Up	Paraguay - Giuliana Ocariz
3rd Runner-Up	United States - Andrea Almestica
4th Runner-Up	United States Virgin Islands - Darelys Nico
Top 8	Mexico - Adriana Cantú; Netherlands - Mila Thewessen; Venezuela - Franceliz Gonzalez
Top 18	Brazil - Janine Feitosa; Colombia - Lauren Lopesierra; Dominican Republic - Jailyn Maria Peralta; India - Divya Wadhwa; Indonesia - Claudia Jessica Putri Mamonto; Mongolia - Vrjingoo Batitgelt; Myanmar - Mary Ja Doi Aung; Peru - Andrea Garcia Bedoya; Philippines - Queen Nathalie P. Zafra; Russia - Stefania Nedilko

§ – Voted into the Top 8 by the viewers and awarded as Eventista Miss Popular Vote

== Contestants ==
Country	Candidate	Hometown
Botswana	Anke Nkwe	Gaborone
Brazil	Janine Feitosa	Pernambuco
Cambodia	Sreynith Heng	Phnom Penh
Colombia	Lauren Lopesierra	Riohacha
Cuba	Jhoanna Uranga	Miami
Czech Republic	Salome Resová	Brno
Dominican Republic	Jailyn Maria Peralta	Santo Domingo
France	Loane Martinez	Lyon
India	Divya Wadhwa	Ahmedabad
Indonesia	Claudia Jessica Putri Mamonto	Gorontalo
Miss Teen International Latina	Devorath Ekatherina Rodriguez	Miami
Latvia	Maria Elizabete Mishurova	Riga
Mexico	Adriana Cantú	Monterrey
Mongolia	Vrjingoo Batitgelt	Ulaanbaatar
Myanmar	Mary Ja Doi Aung	Myitkyina
Namibia	Chantal Boeren	Windhoek
Nepal	Dibya Thapa	Kathmandu
Netherlands	Mila Thewessen	Amsterdam
New Zealand	Daneigh Erasmus	Auckland
Nigeria	Hadassah Matilukuro	Ogun
Panama	Fabiola Hayes	Herrera
Paraguay	Giuliana Ocariz	Asunción
Peru	Andrea Garcia Bedoya	Yungay
Philippines	Queen Nathalie P. Zafra	Las Piñas
Russia	Stefania Nedilko	Crimea
Serbia	Ena Milkovic	Belgrade
Spain	Ana Portela	Huelva
Sri Lanka	Diwyangana Senevirathne	Colombo
Suriname	Chayenn Thakoer	Paramaribo
United States	Andrea Almestica	Miami
United States Virgin Islands	Darelys Nico	Miami
Venezuela	Franceliz Gonzalez	Barcelona
Zimbabwe	Lola Elizabeth Amira Nice	Harare
