= Miss Teen International 2023 =

- Date: June 22, 2023
- Venue: Phnom Penh, Cambodia
- Entrants: 21
- Placements: 15
- Debuts: Cuba; Dominican Republic; Nigeria
- Withdrawals: Belgium; Portugal; Serbia; United States; Zimbabwe
- Returns: Laos; Malaysia; Sri Lanka; Venezuela
- Winner: Bárbara Párraga; Venezuela
- Best National Costume: Gyska Salsabila Iswansyah; Indonesia

Miss Teen International 2023, the 4th Miss Teen International pageant, was held on June 22, 2023, in Phnom Penh, Cambodia. Ngô Ngọc Gia Hân of Vietnam crowned her successor Bárbara Párraga of Venezuela at the end of the event.

== Final results ==
Placement	Candidate
Miss Teen International 2023	Venezuela — Bárbara Párraga
1st runner-up	India - Mannat Siwach
2nd runner-up	Cambodia - Nidanath Sok
3rd Runner-up	Dominican Republic - Itamar Salcedo
4th Runner-up	Vietnam - Bùi Vũ Xuân Nghi
Top 8	Netherlands - Floortje Timmer; Philippines - Angel Jed Latorre; Thailand - Chanoknan Rochanasmith
Top 15	Botswana - Rosa Osenotse; Cuba - Jennifer Duquesne; Laos - Vanvisa Namsena; Malaysia - Alice Ong Hui Ling; Mexico - Paulina Rodriguez; Namibia - Zoë Karsten; South Africa - Washu Masindi Hlabioa

=== Continental Queens of Beauty ===
Continent	Contestant
Africa	South Africa – Washu Masindi Hlabioa
Americas	Mexico – Paulina Rodríguez
Asia	Philippines – Angel Jed Latorre
Europe	Netherlands – Floortje Timmer

=== Special awards ===
Position	Contestant
Miss Popular	Botswana - Rosa Osenotse
Miss Fashion Icon	Cuba - Jennifer Duquesne
Top Model	South Africa - Washu Masindi Hlabioa
Beauty with a Purpose	India - Mannat Siwach
Best in Personal Interview	Dominican Republic - Itamar Salcedo
Best Body	Venezuela - Bárbara Párraga
Best in Ramp Walk	India - Mannat Siwach
Miss Congeniality	Cambodia - Nidanath Sok
Best in National Costume	Indonesia - Gyska Salsabila Iswansyah
Best in Swimsuit	Venezuela - Bárbara Párraga
Best in Evening Gown	Philippines - Angel Jed Latorre

== Contestants ==
Country	Candidate	Hometown
Botswana	Rosa Osenotse	Gaborone
Cambodia	Nidanath Sok	Phnom Penh
Canada	Bianca Buzila	Ontario
Cuba	Jennifer Duquesne	Havana
Dominican Republic	Johanny Itamar Salcedo	Santo Domingo
India	Mannat Siwach	Jaipur
Indonesia	Gyska Salsabila Iswansyah	Palu
Laos	Vanvisa Namsena	Vientiane
Malaysia	Alice Ong Hui Ling	Kuching
Mexico	Paulina Rodríguez	Querétaro
Mongolia	Nomingoo Tumur-Ochir	Ulaanbaatar
Namibia	Zoë Karsten	Windhoek
Nepal	Anmol Sharma	Kathmandu
Netherlands	Floortje Timmer	Utrecht
Nigeria	Yusuf Oyarazi Zuleihat	Kogi
Philippines	Angel Jed Zaragoza Latorre	Iloilo City
South Africa	Washu Masindi Hlabioa	Polokwane
Sri Lanka	Sanjana Kumarasena	Colombo
Thailand	Chanoknan Rochanasmith	Bangkok
Venezuela	Bárbara Gabriela Párraga Alvarado	Guárico
Vietnam	Bùi Vũ Xuân Nghi	Đồng Nai
