= Miss Universe India =

National beauty pageant in India

Miss Universe India Organization
- Type: Beauty pageant
- Franchise holder: Glamanand Group
- Headquarters: New Delhi
- Country represented: India
- Qualifies for: Miss Universe; Miss International; Miss Charm
- First edition: 2024
- Most recent edition: 2026
- National Director: Nikhil Anand
- Language: English
- Predecessor: Miss Diva
- Website: Official Website

Miss Universe India is a beauty pageant under the Glamanand Group organisation that selects India's official representative to the Miss Universe pageant since 2024.

== History ==
Prior to 2024, Miss Diva under Femina Miss India served as the official franchise for Miss Universe in India. In February 2024, the Glamanand Group became responsible for the franchise in India.

The first Miss Universe India competition took place on 22 September 2024 at Zee Studios in Jaipur. Rhea Singha won the title, with Urvashi Rautela, Miss Universe India 2015, crowning her. The runner-up positions went to Pranjal Priya (first), Chhavi Verg (second), Sushmita Roy (third), and Ruopfuzhano Whiso (fourth).

=== International guests ===
Under the leadership of Nikhil Anand, the National Director of the Miss Universe India organization, several international guests, including titleholders from global beauty pageants, have visited India. The following is a list of notable visitors:

Year	Date	Guest(s)	Title	Purpose	Ref.
2024	May 8, 2024	Sheynnis Palacios	Miss Universe 2023	Sightseeing tour	
2025	March 19, 2025	Victoria Kjær Theilvig	Miss Universe 2024	Miss Universe India 2025 press conference, Sightseeing tour	
2025	August 18, 2025	Rashmita Rasindran	Miss Charm 2024	Attendee at the Miss Universe India 2025 Coronation	
2026	August 23, 2026	Anna Blanco	Miss Charm 2025	Attendee at the Miss Universe India 2026 Coronation	
2026	August 20, 2026	Catalina Duque	Miss International 2025	Attendee at the Miss Universe India 2026 preliminary competition	

== Editions ==
Below is the complete list of Miss Universe India editions.

Year	Date	Miss Universe India	Runners-Up		Entrants	Presenters	Pageant venue	Broadcaster
2024	September 22, 2024	Rhea Singha	1st Runner-Up	Pranjal Priya	51	Lance Raymundo, Ngô Ngọc Gia Hân	Zee Studios, Jaipur	YouTube
2024	September 22, 2024	Rhea Singha	2nd Runner-Up	Chhavi Verg	51	Lance Raymundo, Ngô Ngọc Gia Hân	Zee Studios, Jaipur	YouTube
2024	September 22, 2024	Rhea Singha	3rd Runner-Up	Sushmita Roy	51	Lance Raymundo, Ngô Ngọc Gia Hân	Zee Studios, Jaipur	YouTube
2024	September 22, 2024	Rhea Singha	4th Runner-Up	Ruopfüzhano Whiso	51	Lance Raymundo, Ngô Ngọc Gia Hân	Zee Studios, Jaipur	YouTube
2025	August 18, 2025	Manika Vishwakarma	1st Runner-Up	Tanya Sharma	48	Asmita Chakraborty, Chayanika Debnath	Zee Studios, Jaipur	YouTube
2025	August 18, 2025	Manika Vishwakarma	2nd Runner-Up	Mehak Dhingra	48	Asmita Chakraborty, Chayanika Debnath	Zee Studios, Jaipur	YouTube
2025	August 18, 2025	Manika Vishwakarma	3rd Runner-Up	Amishi Kaushik	48	Asmita Chakraborty, Chayanika Debnath	Zee Studios, Jaipur	YouTube
2025	August 18, 2025	Manika Vishwakarma	4th Runner-Up	Sarangthem Nirupama	48	Asmita Chakraborty, Chayanika Debnath	Zee Studios, Jaipur	YouTube
2026	August 23, 2026	Kaziah Mejo	1st Runner-Up	Vaishnavi Ganesh	52	Shwetha Jayaram	Zee Studios, Jaipur	YouTube
2026	August 23, 2026	Kaziah Mejo	2nd Runner-Up	Anushri Satavlekar	52	Shwetha Jayaram	Zee Studios, Jaipur	YouTube
2026	August 23, 2026	Kaziah Mejo	3rd Runner-Up	Tejaswini Shrivastava	52	Shwetha Jayaram	Zee Studios, Jaipur	YouTube
2026	August 23, 2026	Kaziah Mejo	4th Runner-Up	Anubha Vashisth	52	Shwetha Jayaram	Zee Studios, Jaipur	YouTube

== Representatives at Miss Universe ==
Color Keys

- : Declared as Winner
- : Ended as runner-up or Top 5/6 qualification
- : Ended as one of the Finalists
- : Ended as one of the Semi-finalists

Year	Miss Universe India	Age	State	Placement at Miss Universe	Special award(s)
2024	Rhea Singha	19	Gujarat	Top 30	
2025	Manika Vishwakarma	22	Rajasthan	Top 30	
2026	Kaziah Mejo	19	Kerala	TBA	
