= Miss Teen International (India) 2019 =

27th Miss Teen International pageant, beauty pageant edition

- Date: December 19, 2019
- Venue: Kingdom of Dreams, Gurugram, Haryana, India
- Entrants: 13
- Placements: 7
- Withdrawals: Belgium; Canada; Gibraltar; Malaysia; Mexico; United States
- Winner: Aayushi Dholakia; India
- Best National Costume: Aayushi Dholakia; India; Francesca Beatriz Abalajon; Philippines

Miss Teen International 2019, the 2nd edition of the Miss Teen International pageant, was held on December 19, 2019, at the Kingdom of Dreams in Gurugram, India. Odalys Duarte of Mexico crowned her successor Aayushi Dholakia of India at the end of the event. This is India's first Miss Teen International title.

== Result ==
Final result	Contestant
Miss Teen International 2019	India – Aayushi Dholakia
1st Runner-Up	Paraguay - Yessenia Garcia
2nd Runner-Up	Botswana - Anicia Gaothusi
3rd Runner-Up	Philippines - Francesca Beatriz Abalajon
4th Runner-Up	South Africa - Kayla Wright
Top 7	Laos - Soraya Lynn Conde; Vietnam - Phan Anh Thư

=== Continental Queens of Beauty ===
Continent	Contestant
Africa	Botswana - Anicia Gaothusi
Americas	Brazil - Alessandra Santos
Asia	Vietnam - Phan Anh Thư
Europe	France - Tanya Pozzo
Intercontinental	Philippines - Francesca Beatriz Abalajon

== Contestants ==
Country	Candidate	Hometown
Botswana	Anicia Gaothusi	Gaborone
Brazil	Alessandra Santos	Brasília
Egypt	Sama Fouad	Cairo
France	Angeli Desarie Lachica	Toronto
India	Aayushi Dholakia	Vadodara
Italy	Maria Luisa Piras	Turin
Laos	Soraya Lynn Conde	Vientiane
Nepal	Edera Shrestha	Kathmandu
Paraguay	Yessenia Garcia	Asunción
Philippines	Francesca Beatriz Abalajon	Aklan
South Africa	Kayla Wright	Edenvale
Sri Lanka	Tania Rupasinghe	Matara
Vietnam	Phan Anh Thư	Huế
