= Trishna Ray =

Indian female pageant winner

- Born: 6 September 2004 (age 22); Bhubaneswar, Odisha, India
- Education: Kalinga Institute of Industrial Technology
- Occupation: Model
- Beauty pageant titleholder
- Title: Miss Teen Universe India 2023; Miss Teen Universe 2024
- Years active: 2023–present
- Major competitions: Miss Teen Diva 2023 (Miss Teen Universe India 2023); Miss Teen Universe 2024 (Winner)

Trishna Ray (born 6 September 2004) is an Indian beauty pageant titleholder who was crowned Miss Teen Universe 2024 on November 9, 2024, in South Africa. She is the first Indian to win the Miss Teen Universe title.

== Early life and education ==
Ray was born in Bhubaneswar, Odisha, to Dillip Kumar Ray, a Colonel at Indian Armed Forces and Rajashree Ray. She is currently studying fashion technology at Kalinga Institute of Industrial Technology in Bhubaneswar. As reported by Kalinga TV, she lives with her family in Cuttack, Odisha.

== Pageantry ==
=== Miss Teen Diva 2023 ===
Trishna participated in the Miss Teen Diva 2023 competition on April 13, 2023, at Zee Studios in Jaipur. She was crowned Miss Teen Universe India 2023, succeeding the previous titleholder, Brunda Yerrabali. Alongside the main title, she received several subtitle awards, including Best in Ramp Walk, Beauty with Brains, Best in Speech, and Miss Teen India East.

=== Miss Teen Universe 2024 ===
Ray participated in the Miss Teen Universe 2024 pageant, held from November 1 to 9, 2024, in Kimberley, Northern Cape, South Africa. She was crowned the winner during the grand finale by the outgoing titleholder, Lynette Arce-Garcia of Cuba, becoming the first Indian to win the Miss Teen Universe title. During the competition, Ray excelled in several challenges organized by the pageant, including winning the Miss Talent round, placing in the Top 5 for Best National Costume, and securing spots in the Top 10 for the Influencer Challenge, Face-to-Face Challenge, and Miss Social Media Challenge.

Awards and achievements
| Preceded by (Cuba) Lynette Arce-Garcia | Miss Teen Universe; 2024 | Succeeded by (Venezuela) Amira Moreno |
| Preceded by Brunda Yerrabali | Miss Teen Universe India; 2023 | Succeeded by Carrissa Bopanna |
