= Rhea Singha =

Indian model, beauty pageant titleholder (born 2004)

- Born: 10 December 2004 (age 21); Ahmedabad, India
- Education: GLS University
- Occupation: Model
- Height: 1.70 m (5 ft 7 in)
- Beauty pageant titleholder
- Title: MissTeen India Diva 2021; Teen Earth 2023; Miss Universe India 2024
- Hair color: Dark Brown
- Eye color: Brown
- Major competitions: Miss Teen India Diva 2021 (Winner); Teen Earth 2023 (Winner); Teen Universe 2023; (Top 6); Miss Universe India 2024; (Winner); Miss Universe 2024; (Top 30)

Rhea Singha (born 10 December 2004) is an Indian model, actress and beauty pageant titleholder who won Miss Universe India 2024 on 22 September 2024, in Jaipur, India. Singha represented India at the Miss Universe 2024 pageant held on 16 November 2024, in Mexico and ended up as a Top 30 semi-finalist.

Prior to her Miss Universe India victory, Singha held the title of Teen Earth 2023 at Philippines, Miss Teen India Diva in Jan 2021 at Goa, and Miss Teen Gujarat Diva in Feb 2020. Competition Organised by Diva Pageants PVT LTD

== Early life and career ==
Singha is a model and TEDx speaker, was born in Ahmedabad, Gujarat to father Brijesh Singha and mother Rita Singha. She has a Bachelor's degree in Performing Arts from GLS University in Ahmedabad.

She won her first pageant, Diva's Miss Teen Gujarat in 2020 at the age of 16. Singha represented India at Teen Universe 2023 in Madrid, where she reached the top six against 25 contestants. Later that year, she was the runner-up in JOY Times Fresh Face Season 14 in Mumbai., After that She Represented India in Teen Earth in 2023 in Philippines ,where she won her First International Teen Earth Title

== Pageantry ==
=== Miss Universe India 2024 ===
Singha was announced as a national finalist for the inaugural Miss Universe India competition organized by the Glamanand Group as a wildcard entrant on 17 August 2024, in Delhi. Singha won Miss Universe India 2024 on 22 September 2024, at the Zee Studios in Jaipur. Singha was the first winner under the Glamanand Group to hold the title. Additionally, she won the Miss Glamorous subtitle award.

As Miss Universe India, Rhea visited Vietnam and several Indian cities, including Agra to see the Taj Mahal along with the Miss Universe 2024, Victoria Kjær Theilvig.

=== Miss Universe 2024 ===
Singha represented India at Miss Universe 2024, held in the Arena CDMX, Mexico City, Mexico, on 16 November 2024. She ended up as a Top 30 semi-finalists, marking the country's sixth consecutive placement at Miss Universe.

Teen Earth 2023

Singha represented India at Teen Earth 2023 , held at Okada Resort, Manila City Philippines, on 20 th July 2023, She Won Her FIrst International title as Teen Earth.

Miss Teen India Diva 2021

In her First ever State Pagent Miss Teen Gujarat Diva 2020 ,she Won the State Winner Title, and She represeanted Gujarat in National Pageant Miss Teen India Diva ,where she Won Miss Teen India Diva in 2021.

== Filmography ==
Year	Title	Role	Language	Notes	Ref.
2026	Jetlee	Agent Shivani Roy	Telugu	Debut film	

Awards and achievements
Preceded by Shweta Sharda	Miss Universe India; 2024	Succeeded by Manika Vishwakarma
