= Miss Teen International (India) =

Beauty pageant

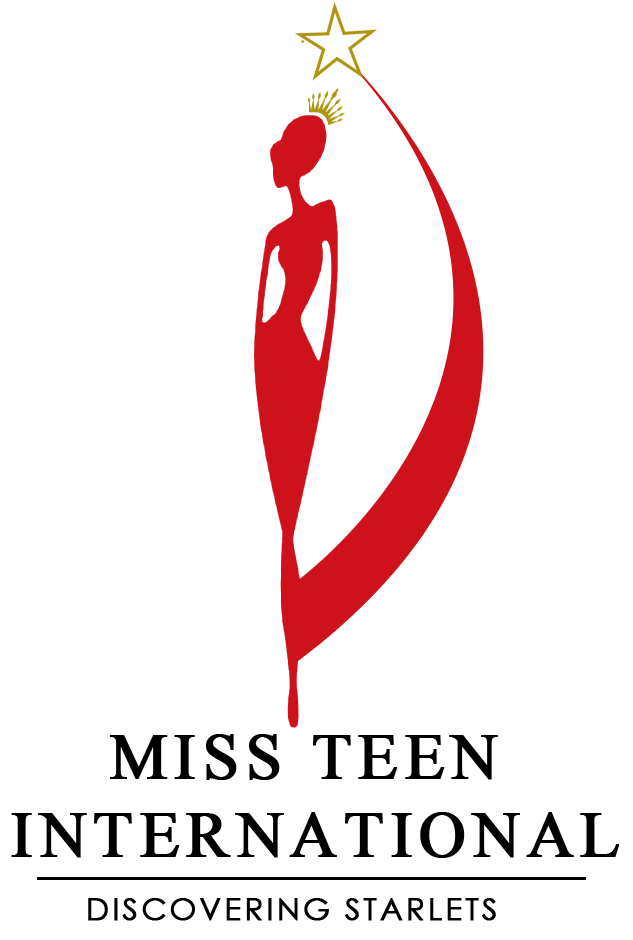
- Formation: 2018; 8 years ago
- Type: Beauty pageant
- Headquarters: New Delhi
- Location: India
- Official language: English
- Director: Nikhil Anand
- Parent organization: Glamanand Group
- Website: missteeninternational.com

Miss Teen International is an annual beauty pageant for girls aged 14 to 19 from various countries. The event is organized by the Glamanand Group, a company led by Indian businessman Nikhil Anand.

In August 2025, the pageant took place in Jaipur, India, where Lorena Ruiz from Spain was crowned Miss Teen International 2025.

== History ==
In 2016, Glamanand Entertainment Pvt. Ltd., under Nikhil Anand, announced plans to revitalize the Miss Teen International pageant. The first edition of the revamped event took place in 2018 and has since been held annually in India. Glamanand Entertainment Pvt. Ltd. holds the Indian trademark for "Miss Teen International" related to beauty pageants.

In 2018, Odalys Duarte from Mexico was crowned the first Miss Teen International under the ownership of Glamanand Group.

The current titleholder, Lorena Ruiz of Spain, was crowned on August 31, 2025, in Jaipur, India. She succeeded Ly Muyleang of Cambodia.

== Titleholders ==
Year	Country	Miss Teen International	Venue	Entrants	Ref.
2018	Mexico	Odalys Duarte	New Delhi, India	10	
2019	India	Aayushi Dholakia	Gurugram, India	13	
2022	Vietnam	Ngô Ngọc Gia Hân	Gurugram, India	20	
2023	Venezuela	Bárbara Párraga	Phnom Penh, Cambodia	21	
2024	Cambodia	Ly Muyleang	Jaipur, India	28	
2025	Spain	Lorenia Ruiz	Jaipur, India	24	
2026	Cuba	Jhoanna Uranga	Jaipur, India	33	

Note – Due to the impact of COVID-19 pandemic, no editions of the event were held in years 2020 and 2021.

== Countries by number of wins ==
Country/Territory	Titles	Years
Cuba	1	2026
Spain	1	2025
Cambodia	1	2024
Venezuela	1	2023
Vietnam	1	2022
India	1	2019
Mexico	1	2018

== Runners-up ==
Year	Runners-up			
Year	First	Second	Third	Fourth
2018	Ritika Khatnani; India	Kiara Pineda; Venezuela	Not awarded	
2019	Yessenia Garcia; Paraguay	Anicia Gaothusi; Botswana	Francesca Beatriz Abalajon; Philippines	Kayla Wright; South Africa
2022	Alessandra Gonzalez; United States	Anne Brouwer; Netherlands	Not awarded	
2023	Mannat Siwach; India	Nidanath Sok; Cambodia	Itamar Salcedo; Dominican Republic	Bùi Vũ Xuân Nghi; Vietnam
2024	Annette Moreno Viu; Cuba	Oriana Ribeiro; Namibia	Onkatlile Koolatotse; Botswana	Regina González; Mexico
2025	Kaziah Liz Mejo; India	Valeria Morales Valero; Colombia	Sabrina Maria Feliciano; Puerto Rico	Grecia Novelo; Mexico
2026	Chantal Boeren; Namibia	Giuliana Ocariz; Paraguay	Andrea Almestica; United States	Darelys Nico; United States Virgin Islands

== Continental Queens ==
Year	Africa	Americas	Asia	Europe	Intercontinental
2019	Anicia Gaothusi; Botswana	Alessandra Santos; Brazil	Phan Anh Thư; Vietnam	Tanya Pozzo; France	Francesca Beatriz Abalajon; Philippines
2022	Gimhani Mohau Perera; Botswana	Nabila Villanueva; Mexico	Rashi Parasrampuria; India	Venera Stanisavljevic; Serbia	Not awarded
2023	Washu Masindi Hlabioa; South Africa	Paulina Rodríguez; Mexico	Angel Jed Latorre; Philippines	Floortje Timmer; Netherlands	Not awarded
2024	Not awarded				

== See also ==
- Femina Miss India
- List of beauty pageants
