= Manika Vishwakarma =

Indian beauty pageant titleholder (born 2003)

- Born: 2nd July, 2003 (23 years); Sri Ganganagar, Rajasthan, India
- Education: University of Delhi
- Beauty pageant titleholder
- Title: Miss Universe India 2025
- Major competitions: Miss Universe India 2024; (Top 20); Miss Universe India 2025; (Winner); Miss Universe 2025; (Top 30)

Manika Vishwakarma is an Indian beauty pageant titleholder who won Miss Universe India 2025 on 18 August 2025 in Jaipur. She represented India at Miss Universe 2025, on 21 November 2025 in Thailand.

== Early life ==
Manika Vishwakarma is originally from Sri Ganganagar, Rajasthan, and currently based in Delhi. She is in the final year of her undergraduate degree in Political Science and Economics from Mata Sundri College for Women, University of Delhi.

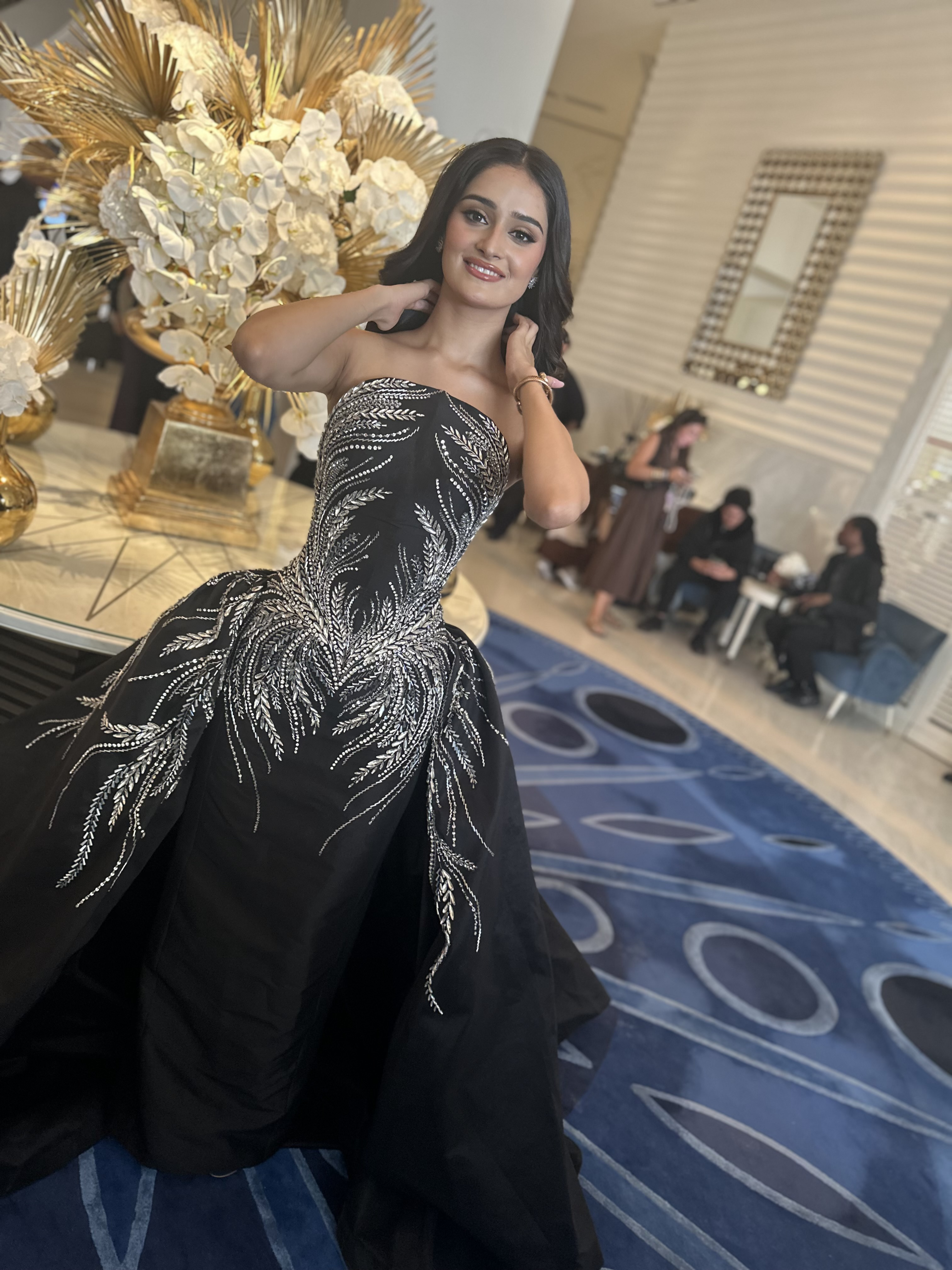
Manika Vishwakarma, Hotel Martinez 2026

She is a graduate of the National Cadet Corps, a trained classical dancer, and a visual artist. Her art has been recognised by institutions including the Lalit Kala Akademi and the Sir J. J. School of Art. Vishwakarma is also the founder of Neuronova, an initiative focused on redefining societal perceptions of neurodivergence and promoting awareness of conditions including ADHD.

== Pageantry ==
=== Miss Universe India 2024 ===
In 2024, Vishwakarma won Miss Universe Rajasthan and went on to represent her state at Miss Universe India 2024, held on 22 September in Jaipur. She reached the top 20 and the top five for the "Best in Speech" award. As Miss Universe Rajasthan, she represented India at the BIMSTEC Sewocon, organised under the aegis of the Ministry of External Affairs.

=== Miss Universe India 2025 ===
On 20 June 2024, Vishwakarma was announced as a national finalist for Miss Universe India 2025 as a wildcard entrant during the final audition event held in Delhi. She was crowned Miss Universe India 2025 on 18 August 2025 by her predecessor, Rhea Singha. During the competition, she received the Best in Personal Interview and Miss Beautiful Smile awards, and was also ranked among the top five in the Best in Speech category.

As Miss Universe India 2025, Manika travelled across multiple Indian states to crown state titleholders. She also represented the title internationally, visiting Vietnam, Thailand, United Arab Emirates and France for the 2026 Cannes Film Festival.

=== Miss Universe 2025 ===
Vishwakarma represented India at Miss Universe 2025, on 21 November 2025 at the Impact Challenger Hall in Pak Kret, Nonthaburi, Thailand. She was one of the 30 semi-finalists, and maintained India's ongoing streak at the pageant since it began at Miss Universe 2019.

Awards and achievements
Preceded by Rhea Singha	Miss Universe India; 2025	Succeeded by Kaziah Mejo
