= Aayushi Dholakia =

Indian female pageant winner

- Born: 25 February 2003 (age 23); Vadodara, Gujarat, India
- Education: Anand Vidyavihar School, Vadodara
- Occupation: Model
- Beauty pageant titleholder
- Title: Miss Teen India International 2019; Miss Teen International 2019
- Years active: 2018–present
- Eye color: Brown
- Major competitions: Miss Teen India International 2019 (Winner); Miss Teen International 2019 (Winner); Femina Miss India 2024 (2nd Runner-Up)

Aayushi Dholakia is an Indian beauty queen, who was crowned as Miss Teen International 2019 on 19 December 2019 in New Delhi, India. She is the first Indian to win the title of Miss Teen International.

== Pageantry ==
=== Miss Teen India 2019 ===
Aayushi competed in the Miss Teen India 2019 competition owned by Glamanand held at the JaiBagh Palace, Jaipur on 30 September 2019 where she was crowned Miss Teen International 2019 by outgoing queen, Ritika Khatnani. During the competition she also bagged several sub-awards including Miss Congeniality, Miss Environment and Miss Beauty with Cause.

=== Miss Teen International 2019 ===
Aayushi represented India in the Miss Teen International 2019 pageant held in New Delhi, India where she was crowned Miss Teen International 2019 by outgoing queen Odalys Duarte of Mexico. Competing against 20 contestants from around the globe, Aayushi became the first Indian to win the Miss Teen International crown in the pageant's 27-year history. During the final question and answer portion, the contestants were asked different questions by the host, including "Do you believe that when the entire world had just an international federal government with no split nation, then globe might have already been a significantly better destination?"

Awards and achievements
Preceded by Manipur; Thounaojam Strela Luwang	Femina Miss India 2nd Runner-Up; 2024	Succeeded by Sree Advaita G
Preceded by Simran Saini	Femina Miss India Gujarat 2024; 2024	Succeeded by Parinaaz Cooper
Preceded by (Mexico) Odalys Duarte	Miss Teen International; 2019	Succeeded by (Vietnam) Ngô Ngọc Gia Hân
Preceded by Ritika Khatnani	Miss Teen India; 2019	Succeeded by Rashi Parasrampuria
