= Miss Teen International 2022 =

28th Miss Teen International pageant, beauty pageant edition

- Date: July 30, 2022
- Presenters: Aayushi Dholakia
- Venue: GNC Convention, Gurugram, Haryana, India
- Entrants: 19
- Placements: 10
- Debuts: Cambodia; Indonesia; Mongolia; Namibia; Netherlands; Portugal; Serbia; Thailand; Zimbabwe
- Withdrawals: Brazil; Egypt; France; Italy; Laos; Paraguay; Sri Lanka
- Returns: Belgium; Canada; Mexico; United States
- Winner: Ngô Ngọc Gia Hân; Vietnam
- Best National Costume: Nabila Villanueva; Mexico

Miss Teen International 2022, the 3rd edition of the Miss Teen International pageant, was held on July 30, 2022, at the GNH Convention Centre in Gurugram, India. Aayushi Dholakia of India crowned her successor Ngô Ngọc Gia Hân of Vietnam by the end of the event. This is Vietnam's first Miss Teen International and the second Asian win in 29 years.

== Final results ==
Placement	Candidate
Miss Teen International 2022	Vietnam — Ngô Ngọc Gia Hân
1st runner-up	United States — Alessandra Gonzalez
2nd runner-up	Netherlands — Anne Brouwer
Top 5	Mexico — Nabila Villanueva; Serbia — Venera Stanisavljevic
Top 10	Botswana — Gimhani Mohau Perera (●); Cambodia — Panha Vimealea Dy; Canada — Angeli Desarie Lachica; India — Rashi Parasrampuria; Namibia — Alexis Swart

(●): The candidate won the Miss People's Choice Award (online voting) and got direct entry into Top 10 Finalists.

=== Continental Queens of Beauty ===
Continent	Contestant
Africa	Botswana – Gimhani Mohau Perera
Americas	Mexico – Nabila Villanueva
Asia	India – Rashi Parasrampuria
Europe	Serbia – Venera Stanisavljevic

=== Special awards ===
Award	Candidate
Best in Swimsuit	Cambodia – Panha Vimealea Dy
Miss Popular Vote	Botswana – Gimhani Mohau Perera
Miss Congeniality	Namibia – Alexis Swart
Miss Fashion Icon	Mexico – Nabila Villanueva
Best National Costume	Mexico – Nabila Villanueva
Best in Body	Netherlands – Anne Brouwer
Best in Ramp Walk	Canada – Angeli Desarie Lachica
Best in Evening Gown	United States – Alessandra Gonzalez

== Contestants ==
Country	Candidate	Hometown
Belgium	Danitsja Schoutteet	Maldegem
Botswana	Gimhani Mohau Perera	Gaborone
Cambodia	Panha Vimealea Dy	Kampong Chhnang
Canada	Angeli Desarie Lachica	Toronto
India	Rashi Parasrampuria	Mumbai
Indonesia	Graciela Soares	Kupang
Mexico	Nabila Villanueva	Reynosa
Mongolia	Emujin Naranbold	Ulaanbaatar
Namibia	Alexis Swart	Windhoek
Nepal	Samikshya Niraula	Bhaktapur
Netherlands	Anne Brouwer	Ugchelen
Philippines	Eurica Cielo C. Abarro	Bacolod
Portugal	Beatriz Nogueira	Lisbon
Serbia	Venera Stanisavljevic	Niš
South Africa	Mieke Van Der Merwe	Howick
Thailand	Teppawee Sung-ong	Bangkok
United States	Alessandra Gonzalez	Chicago
Vietnam	Ngô Ngọc Gia Hân	Ho Chi Minh City
Zimbabwe	Kee-Vonne Hunda	Harare
