= List of Femina Miss India titleholders =

List of Femina Miss India titleholders, Femina Miss India winners

The following is a list of women who have won the Femina Miss India title.

== Format ==
The Femina Miss India pageant, which began in 1947, has been known by various names depending on the organizers running the pageant. Currently, it is organised by Femina, a women's magazine published by The Times Group. Until 2017, participants from across the country competed with no regional limitations. The number of entrants also varied between editions. However, since 2017, the organization has implemented regional participation zones: North, South, Northeast, West, and East. This allows for representatives from every state to compete.

The winner of the Femina Miss India pageant typically represents India at the Miss World pageant and holds the title of Femina Miss India World. However, runners-up may sometimes be chosen to represent India at other international pageants or none. There are no specific, predetermined titles awarded to the runners-up. In some cases, even contestants who are not runners-up are appointed to represent India at other international beauty pageants.

== Femina Miss India titleholders (2017–present) ==
Year	State	Titleholder	Age	Hometown	Region	Location	Date	Entrants
2017	Haryana	Manushi Chhillar	20	Rohtak	North	Yash Raj Studios, Mumbai	June 25, 2017	30
2018	Tamil Nadu	Anukreethy Vas	18	Tiruchirapalli	South	DOME, Sardar Vallabhbhai Patel Indoor Stadium, Mumbai	June 19, 2018	30
2019	Rajasthan	Suman Rao	19	Rajsamand	West	DOME, Sardar Vallabhbhai Patel Indoor Stadium, Mumbai	June 15, 2019	30
2020	Telangana	Manasa Varanasi	22	Hyderabad	South	Hyatt Regency, Mumbai	February 10, 2021	31
2022	Karnataka	Sini Shetty	20	Udupi	South	Jio World Convention Centre, Mumbai	July 3, 2022	30
2023	Rajasthan	Nandini Gupta	19	Kota	West	Khuman Lampak Main Stadium, Imphal	April 15, 2023	30
2024	Madhya Pradesh	Nikita Porwal	24	Ujjain	North	Famous Studios, Mumbai	October 16, 2024	30
2026	Goa	Sadhvi Satish Sail	24	Goa	West	KIIT, Bhubaneswar, Odisha	April 18, 2026	30

== States by number of wins ==
Country or territory	Titles	Years
Rajasthan	2	2019, 2023
Goa	1	2026
Madhya Pradesh	1	2024
Karnataka	1	2022
Telangana	1	2020
Tamil Nadu	1	2018
Haryana	1	2017

== Regions by number of wins ==
Regional Zone	Titles	Years
South	3	2018, 2020, 2022
West	3	2019, 2023, 2026
North	2	2017, 2024
East	0	
North East	0	

== Winners gallery ==
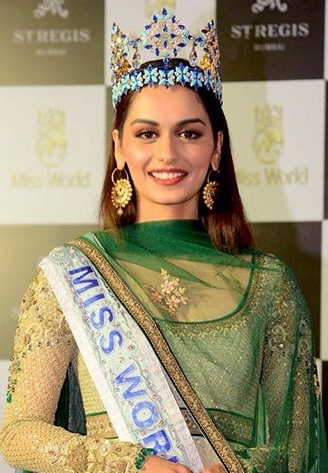
Manushi Chhillar,
Femina Miss India 2017, Miss World 2017

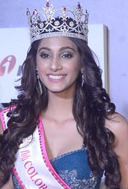
Anukreethy Vas,
Femina Miss India 2018

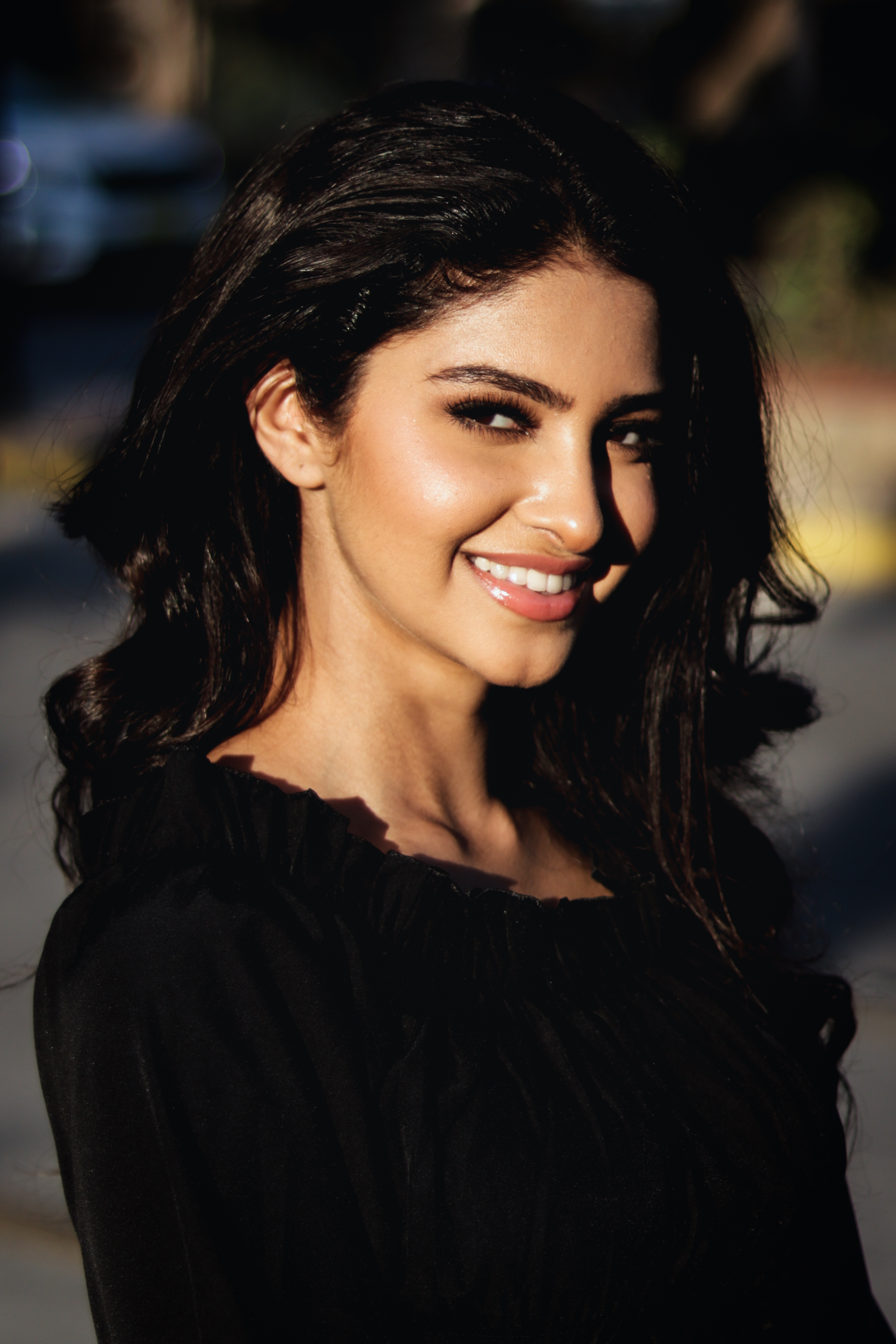
Manasa Varanasi,
Femina Miss India 2020

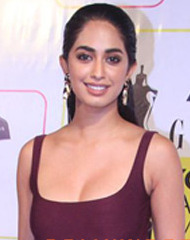
Sini Shetty,
Femina Miss India 2022

== Runners-up(s) ==
Year	1st Runner-Up (2nd Place)	2nd Runner-Up (3rd Place)
2017	Jammu & Kashmir; Sana Dua	Bihar; Priyanka Kumari
2018	Haryana; Meenakshi Chaudhary	Andhra Pradesh; Shreya Rao Kamavarapu
2019	Chhattisgarh; Shivani Jadhav	Bihar; Shreya Shanker
2020	Haryana; Manika Sheokand	Uttar Pradesh; Manya Singh
2022	Rajasthan; Rubal Shekhawat	Uttar Pradesh; Shinata Chauhan
2023	Delhi; Shreya Poonja	Manipur; Thounaojam Strela Luwang
2024	Union Territory; Rekha Pandey	Gujarat; Aayushi Dholakia
2026	Maharashtra; Rajnandini Pawar	Union Territory; Sree Advaita G

== Femina Miss India placement table by states ==
Color key

- : Declared as Winner
- : Ended as runner-up/Secondary International Titleholder
- : Ended as one of the finalist/semi-finalists
- : Unplaced but given special award(s)

=== East Zone ===
States Year	Bihar	Chhattisgarh	Jharkhand	Odisha	West Bengal
2026	Anjali Nandi	Anushka Sone; Top 15	Shreya Agrawal	Ayushi Panda; Top 15	Mohana Panday
2024	Aditi Jha	Vishakha Rai	Riya Nandini; Top 15	Ananya Panda	Dolly Singh
2023	Tanu Shree	Aditi Sharma; Top 7	Kushmandvi Sharma	Janvi Soni	Shaswati Bala; Top 12
2022	Kajal Rani	Sifat Sehgal; Top 10	Riya Tirkey	Tanishq Singh	Megna Mukherjee
2020	Ananya Priyadarshini	Angela Kumar; Top 15	Rupali Bhushan; Top 15	Subhashree Rayaguru	Mouli Haldar; Top 15
2019	Shreya Shanker; Femina Miss India United Continents	Shivani Jadhav; Femina Miss Grand India	Chitrapriya Singh	Sheetal Sahu	Sushmita Roy
2018	Bhavna Jain	Spandana Palli; Top 12	Stefy Patel; Top 5	Shrutiksha Nayak; Top 12	Prarthna Sarkar
2017	Priyanka Kumari; Femina Miss India Intercontinental	Vinali Bhatnagar	Vamika Nidhi	Christeena Biju	Shivankita Dixit

=== North East Zone ===
States Year	Arunachal Pradesh	Assam	Manipur	Meghalaya	Mizoram	Nagaland	Sikkim	Tripura
2026	Mariam Longri	Bagmita Saikia; Top 15	Chanchui Khayi	Ridamaya Passah	BC Lalmuankimi	Nikali K Shohe	Deekila Sherpa; Top 15	Shreeya Debbarma
2024	Tadu Lunia; Top 15	Arundhuti Saikia	Chanchui Khayi	Angelia N Marwein; Top 7	Lalsangkimi	Jentiren Jamir	Sahara Subba	Nikita Ghosh
2023	Tana Puniya	Anushka Lekharu; Top 12	Thounaojam Strela Luwang; 2nd Runner-Up	Irene Dkhar	C. Lalhmangaihzuali	Ezhotou Keyho	Zaanvii Sharma; Top 12	Nabanita Bhattacharjee
2022	Tengam Celine Koyu	Diya Palit	Angobi Chanu Loukrakpam	Gargee Nandy; Top 5	Lalramhlui Sailo	Lovi Awomi	Pranita Chettri	Hritwika Majumder
2020	Millo Meena	Amrita Kashyap	Maria Pangambam	Tanvi Marak	Lalmuansangi Varte	Zuchobeni Tüngoe; Top 15	Reetika Chettri	Chayanika Debnath
2019	Roshni Dada	Jyotishmita Baruah; Top 6	Urmila Shagolsem	Sangeeta Das	Lalnunthari Rualhleng; Top 12	Marina Kiho	Sang Doma Tamang	Jayanti Reang
2018	Osin Mosu	Sunaina Kamath	Nimrit Kaur Ahluwalia; Top 12	Mary Khyriem; Top 15	Lily Lalremkimi Darnei; Top 15	Ruopfüzhano Whiso	Pramila Chettri	Mamita Debbarma
2017	Licha Thosum; Top 15	Triveni Barman; Top 15	Kanchan Soibam	Kiran Laishram	Rody H Vanlalhriatpuii; Top 15	Kaheli Chophy	Roshni Ghimirey	Rinky Chakma

=== North Zone ===
States Year	Delhi	Haryana	Himachal Pradesh	Jammu & Kashmir	Madhya Pradesh	Punjab	Uttarakhand	Uttar Pradesh
2026	Devanshi Paliwal	Debasmita Gaur	Shreya Thakur; Top 8	State merged with the Union Territory	Dhanushree Chauhan; Top 8	Yashika Sharma; Top 8	Anchal Farswan	Sania Mukherjee
2024	Sifti Singh Sarang; Top 7	Supriya Dahiya; Top 15	Aabha Katre	State merged with the Union Territory	Nikita Porwal; WINNER	Amrita Sethi	Sakshi Joshi; Top 15	Divyanshi Batra; Top 15
2023	Shreya Poonja; 1st Runner-Up	Meharmeet Kaur	Nikeet Dhillon; Top 12	State merged with the Union Territory	Pratika Saxena	Shyna Choudhary	Ameesha Basera	Tanya Sharma; Top 12
2022	Prakshi Goel	Savvy Rai; Top 10	Amisha Thakur; Top 10	Angelia Baghi	Aaradhya Rao	Lekh Uthaihah	Aishwarya Bisht	Shinata Chauhan; 2nd Runner-Up
2020	Supriya Dahiya; Top 15	Manika Sheokand; Femina Miss Grand India	Titiksha Taggar	Ritika Raina	Rudrapriya Yadav	Karuna Singh; Top 15	Aishwarya Goel; Top 15	Manya Singh; Runner-Up
2019	Mansi Sehgal	Sonal Sharma	Garima Verma	Megha Kaul	Garima Yadav; Top 12	Harnaaz Sandhu; Top 12	Siddhi Gupta; Top 12	Shinata Chauhan; Top 6
2018	Gayatri Bharadwaj; Femina Miss India United Continents	Meenakshi Chaudhary; Femina Miss Grand India	Swattee Thakur	Malika Kapoor	Meena Ahir	Anna Kler	Sumita Bhandari	Himanshi Parashar
2017	Maira Chowdhury; Top 15	Manushi Chhillar; WINNER	Santoshi Ranaut	Sana Dua; Femina Miss India United Continents	Adya Shrivastava	Navpreet Kaur; Top 15	Anukriti Gusain; Femina Miss Grand India	Shefali Sood; Top 6

=== South Zone ===
States Year	Andhra Pradesh	Karnataka	Kerala	Tamil Nadu	Telangana
2026	Chilakalapudi Indu Phalguni; Top 15	Khushi Ramesh Kalakeri; Top 15	Medhavi Saboo	Tejashvee Arunprassad	Ramya Kailasa; Top 15
2024	Bhavya Reddy	Apeksha Shetty; Top 15	Akshatha Das	Malina; Top 15	Prakruthi Kambam
2023	Gomathy Reddy	Megan Edward; Top 7	Christeena Biju; Top 7	Karunya Mohanasundaram	Urmila Chauhan
2022	Sailikhita Yalamanchili; Top 10	Sini Shetty; WINNER	Soumya Shasi Kumar	Shivani Rajashekar	Pragnya Ayyagari; Top 5
2020	Tejal Patil	Rati Hulji; Top 5	Leena Lal; Top 15	Raina Garg; Top 20	Manasa Varanasi; WINNER
2019	Nikita Tanwani	Aashna Bisht	Lakshmi Menon	Rubeiya S K	Sanjana Vij; 1st Runner-Up
2018	Shreya Rao Kamaravapu; 2nd Runner-Up	Bhavana Durgam Reddy; Top 12	Mekhana Shajan	Anukreethy Vas; WINNER	Kamakshi Bhaskarla
2017	Srishti Vyakaranam	Swathi Muppala; Top 15	Mannat Singh; Top 15	Sherlin Seth	Simran Choudhary

=== West Zone & The Union Territory ===
States Year	Goa	Gujarat	Maharashtra	Rajasthan	Union Territory
2026	Sadhvi Satish Sail; WINNER	Parinaaz Cooper; Top 8	Rajnandini Pawar; 1st Runner-Up	Tarushee Rai; Top 8	Sree Advaita G 2nd Runner-Up
2024	Shruti Raul; Top 7	Aayushi Dholakia; 2nd Runner-Up	Arshia Rashid; Top 7	Vaishnavi Sharma; Top 15	Rekha Pandey; 1st Runner-Up
2023	Victoria Fernandes	Simran Saini	Apurva Chavan; Top 7	Nandini Gupta; WINNER	Navya Kalra
2022	Amanda Vas	Arshya Chandrashekhar	Disha Patil; Top 10	Rubal Shekhawat; 1st Runner-Up	Seerat Sidhu
2020	Trisha Shetty	Khushi Misra; Top 5	Angelika Sawhney; Top 15	Aruna Beniwal; Top 15	Ritika Raghav
2019	Shaasthra Shetty	Mansi Taxak; Top 12	Vaishnavi Andhale; Top 12	Suman Rao; WINNER	Region not introduced
2018	Aashna Gurav	Anushka Luhar	Mehaak Punjabi	Nikita Soni	Region not introduced
2017	Audrey D'Silva; Top 15	Amardeep Kaur Syan	Aishwarya Devan; Top 6	Aditi Hundia; Top 15	Region not introduced
