= Femina Miss India 2026 =

Indian beauty pageant

- Date: 18 April 2026
- Presenters: Maniesh Paul; Sarah-Jane Dias
- Entertainment: Ishaan Khatter; Jubin Nautiyal; Lauren Gottlieb; Saswat Joshi
- Venue: KIIT, Bhubaneswar, Odisha
- Broadcaster: Zoom TV; ZEE5; Times Play
- Entrants: 30
- Placements: 15
- Winner: Sadhvi Sail; Goa
- Photogenic: Ramya Kailasa; Telangana

Femina Miss India 2026 was the 61st edition of the Femina Miss India pageant. It was held on 18 April 2026 at the Kalinga Institute of Industrial Technology campus in Bhubaneswar, Odisha. A total of 30 contestants participated, representing the 29 states of India, including the National Capital Territory of Delhi, along with one combined representative for the Union Territories. The complete show is scheduled to air on Zoom TV on 8 May 2026, and will also stream on the ZEE5 and Times Play OTT platforms from the same date.

This edition marked the second time the pageant was held following a break in its annual continuity. A similar interruption in the regular schedule had previously occurred in 2021.

At the end of the event, Nikita Porwal of Madhya Pradesh crowned Sadhvi Sail of Goa as Femina Miss India 2026. Rajnandini Pawar of Maharashtra was crowned first runner-up, while Sree Advaita of the Union Territory was crowned second runner-up.

== Results ==
=== Final Result ===
For regional group:	For international placement:
E East Zone	The contestant won in an international pageant.
NE North East Zone	The contestant was a runner-up in an international pageant.
N North Zone	The contestant was a semi-finalist in an international pageant.
S South Zone	Unplaced
W West Zone
UT Union Territory

Placement	Contestant	International Placement
Femina Miss India World 2026	W Goa – Sadhvi Sail	Miss World 2027 – TBA
1st Runner-Up	W Maharashtra – Rajnandini Pawar	
2nd Runner-Up	UT Union Territory – Sree Advaita G	
Top 8	W Gujarat – Parinaaz Cooper ∆; N Himachal Pradesh – Shreya Thakur; N Madhya Pradesh – Dhanushree Chauhan; N Punjab – Yashika Sharma; W Rajasthan – Tarushee Rai	
Top 15	S Andhra Pradesh – Chilakalapudi Indu Phalguni; NE Assam – Bagmita Saikia; E Chhattisgarh – Anushka Sone; S Karnataka – Khushi Ramesh Kalakeri; E Odisha – Ayushi Panda; NE Sikkim – Deekila Sherpa §; S Telangana – Ramya Kailasa	

§ – Winner of Miss Multimedia
∆ – Winner of Beauty with a Purpose Award

=== Zonal Titleholders ===
The Zonal titles were given to delegates who placed highest in the final, aside from the main crown.

Zonal Titles	Contestant
East	Chhattisgarh – Anushka Sone
North East	Sikkim – Deekila Sherpa
North	Punjab – Yashika Sharma
South	Andhra Pradesh – Chilakalapudi Indu Phalguni
West	Maharashtra – Rajnandini Pawar

=== Sub-title Awards ===
==== Miss Body Beautiful ====
Placement	Contestant
Winner	Gujarat – Parinaaz Cooper
Top 5	Arunachal Pradesh – Mariam Longri; Goa – Sadhvi Satish Sail; Meghalaya – Ridamaya Passah; Punjab – Yashika Sharma

==== Miss Fashion Icon ====
Placement	Contestant
Winner	Gujarat – Parinaaz Cooper
Top 5	Maharashtra – Rajnandini Pawar; Punjab – Yashika Sharma; Telangana – Ramya Kailasa; West Bengal – Mohana Panday

==== Miss Goodness Ambassador ====
Placement	Contestant
Winner	Arunachal Pradesh – Mariam Longri
Top 5	Andhra Pradesh – Chilakalapudi Indu Phalguni; Bihar – Anjali Nandi; Haryana – Debasmita Gaur; Kerala – Medhavi Saboo

==== Miss IQ ====
Placement	Contestant
Winner	Kerala – Medhavi Saboo
Top 5	Haryana – Debasmita Gaur; Himachal Pradesh – Shreya Thakur; Odisha – Ayushi Panda; Union Territory – Sree Advaita G

==== Miss Lifestyle ====
Placement	Contestant
Winner	West Bengal – Mohana Panday
Top 5	Goa – Sadhvi Satish Sail; Madhya Pradesh – Dhanushree Chauhan; Maharashtra – Rajnandini Pawar; Punjab – Yashika Sharma

==== Miss Photogenic ====
Placement	Contestant
Winner	Telangana – Ramya Kailasa
Top 5	Andhra Pradesh – Chilakalapudi Indu Phalguni; Maharashtra – Rajnandini Pawar; Punjab – Yashika Sharma; Rajasthan – Tarushee Rai

==== Miss Radiant Personality ====
Placement	Contestant
Winner	Manipur – Chanchui Khayi
Top 5	Chhattisgarh – Anushka Sone; Gujarat – Parinaz Cooper; Punjab – Yashika Sharma; Union Territory – Sree Advaita G

==== Miss Rampwalk ====
Placement	Contestant
Winner	Punjab – Yashika Sharma
Top 5	Andhra Pradesh – Chilakalapudi Indu Phalguni; Himachal Pradesh – Shreya Thakur; Kerala – Medhavi Saboo; Meghalaya – Ridamaya Passah

==== Miss Sudoku ====
Placement	Contestant
Winner	Madhya Pradesh – Dhanushree Chauhan
Top 5	Chhattisgarh – Anushka Sone; Sikkim – Deekila Sherpa; Tamil Nadu – Tejashvee Arunprassad; Uttar Pradesh – Sania Mukherjee

== Format ==
For the first time in the history of the pageant, Femina Miss India granted state-level franchises to multiple states to independently organize their respective state competitions. Winners of these state pageants will advance to represent their states at the national competition.

In addition to the state franchise format, the traditional zonal audition system will continue to be implemented in regions where independent state pageants are not conducted. Contestants from those states will participate in zonal auditions, after which shortlisted candidates will be selected.

=== Event schedule ===
The following is the list of the schedules of all the events of Femina Miss India 2026:

Event	Date	Location	Jury	Presenter
East Zone Auditions	20 February 2026	Kolkata	Abhishek Dutta – Fashion Designer; Blossom Kochhar – Happiness Coach; Kaustav Saika – Fashion Photographer; Naina More – Author, Motivational Speaker; Shreya Poonja – Femina Miss India 2023 1st Runner-up	Shaswati Bala – FMI West Bengal 2023
North East Zone Auditions	22 February 2026	Guwahati	Amrita Baruva Sawyan – Director, The Guwahati Address Hotel; Bhaskar Saika – Hair and Fashion Stylist; Blossom Kochhar – Happiness Coach; Imlibenla Wati Nienu – Miss Nagaland 2012; Nandini Baruva – Fashion Designer; Payal Chadha – Fashion Designer; Rekha Pandey – Femina Miss India 2024 1st Runner-up	Anushka Lekharu – FMI Assam 2023
South Zone Auditions	13 March 2026	Bangalore	Gokul Ganesan – Mister India World 2024; Natasha Grover – Brand & Operations Head of the Miss India Organization; Prasad Bidapa – Show director; Sushruthi Krishna – Femina Miss India 2016 1st Runner-up; Waseem Khan – Fashion photographer	Prakruthi Kambam – FMI Telangana 2024
North Zone Auditions	15 March 2026	Noida	Bhawana Rao – Fashion designer; Blossom Kochhar – Happiness Coach; Nandini Gupta – Femina Miss India World 2023; Natasha Grover – Brand & Operations Head of the Miss India Organization; Prbhjiit Maniktala – Founder, Vazaneh by Prbhjiit - Cicle of Luxe; Rishi Raj – Fashion director	None
West Zone & Union Territory Auditions, North Zone Final Auditions	19 March 2026	Mumbai	Altamash Faraz – Mister India Supranational 2017; Blossom Kochhar – Happiness Coach; Gokul Ganesan – Mister India World 2024; Natasha Grover – Brand & Operations Head of the Miss India Organization; Nikita Porwal – Femina Miss India World 2024; Sachin Kumbhaar – Television presenter; Sandip Soparrkar – Dance choreographer	Riya Nandini – FMI Jharkhand 2024
South & East Zone Final Auditions	20 March 2026	Mumbai	Blossom Kochhar – Happiness Coach; Gokul Ganesan – Mister India World 2024; Nandini Gupta – Femina Miss India World 2023; Natasha Grover – Brand & Operations Head of the Miss India Organization; Nikita Porwal – Femina Miss India World 2024; Sachin Kumbhaar – Television presenter	Riya Nandini – FMI Jharkhand 2024
Award Night	9 April 2026	Mumbai	None	Pooja Bhamrrah
Grand Finale	18 April 2026	Bhubaneswar	Amaal Mallik – Singer and music director; Celina Jaitly – Femina Miss India 2001; Dutee Chand – Indian track and field athlete; Madhur Bhandarkar – Indian film director and screenwriter; Neha Dhupia – Actress, Femina Miss India 2002; Simran – Actress; Terence Lewis – Dancer and choreographer; Vartika Singh – Miss Diva 2019; Zeenat Aman – Actress, Miss Asia Pacific International 1970 from India	Maniesh Paul; Sarah-Jane Dias; Sreetama Basu (Red carpet)

== Contestants ==
The following is the list of the official delegates of Femina Miss India 2026 representing 29 states +1 common winner from all Union territories of the country:

Color key

- : Declared as Winner
- : Ended as runner-up
- : Ended as one of the finalists/semi-finalists

Zone	State	Delegate
East	Bihar	Anjali Nandi
East	Chhattisgarh	Anushka Sone
East	Jharkhand	Shreya Agrawal
East	Odisha	Ayushi Panda
East	West Bengal	Mohana Panday
North East	Arunachal Pradesh	Mariam Longri
North East	Assam	Bagmita Saikia
North East	Manipur	Chanchui Khayi
North East	Meghalaya	Ridamaya Passah
North East	Mizoram	BC Lalmuankimi
North East	Nagaland	Nikali K Shohe
North East	Sikkim	Deekila Sherpa
North East	Tripura	Shreeya Debbarma
North	Delhi	Devanshi Paliwal
North	Haryana	Debasmita Gaur
North	Himachal Pradesh	Shreya Thakur
North	Madhya Pradesh	Dhanushree Chauhan
North	Punjab	Yashika Sharma
North	Uttarakhand	Anchal Farswan
North	Uttar Pradesh	Sania Mukherjee
South	Andhra Pradesh	Chilakalapudi Indu Phalguni
South	Karnataka	Khushi Ramesh Kalakeri
South	Kerala	Medhavi Saboo
South	Tamil Nadu	Tejashvee Arunprassad
South	Telangana	Ramya Kailasa
West & Union Territory	Goa	Sadhvi Satish Sail
West & Union Territory	Gujarat	Parinaaz Cooper (Note: GUJARAT — Parinaaz Cooper replaced Shivangi Desai, Femina Miss India Gujarat 2026, who withdrew due to unforeseen reason. Appointed by the Femina Miss India Gujarat organization, Parinaaz competed in the Femina Miss India Gujarat 2026 pageant.)
West & Union Territory	Maharashtra	Rajnandini Pawar
West & Union Territory	Rajasthan	Tarushee Rai
West & Union Territory	Union Territory	Sree Advaita G
