= Miss Nagaland =

Indian state beauty pageant

- Formation: 1989
- Type: Beauty pageant
- Headquarters: Kohima
- Location: Nagaland, India
- Official language: English
- Company: Beauty & Aesthetics Society of Nagaland

Miss Nagaland is a state beauty pageant held annually since 1989 in the Northeastern Indian state of Nagaland. Miss Nagaland does not generally send any of its winners or previous contestants to participate in other beauty pageants. Nevertheless, a number of its beauty queens have over the years gone on to compete independently in other beauty pageants at the regional and national levels, as well as internationally.

Miss Nagaland is not affiliated with The Times Group which has since 2017 introduced a new format for the selection of contestants for the Femina Miss India national beauty pageant. The Times Group holds a separate audition to crown a Femina Miss India Nagaland winner to represent the state of Nagaland at Femina Miss India.

The reigning Miss Nagaland is Linoka Achümi.

== History ==
The first Miss Nagaland competition took place in 1989. Since 1991, the Beauty & Aesthetics Society of Nagaland has been organizing the beauty pageant.

== Titleholders ==
Edition	Miss Nagaland	1st Runner Up	2nd Runner Up	Ref.
2025	Linoka Achümi	Bendangienla Longshir	Christina Yeptho	
2024	Anon Konyak	Nikali Shohe	Kelülü Dawhuo	
2023	Neiketuno Sechü	Vimgha Sheqi	Ilihika Aye	
2022	Hikali Achümi	Kenei Ritse	Jentiren Jamir	
2021	Kawimaningsiliu Mharoni Khüvüng	Lika Chophy	Lovi Awomi	
~~2020~~	No pageant held due to the COVID-19 pandemic			
2019	Vikuonuo Sachü	Imnasangla Ao	Viphrotsünuo Kehie	
2018	Mewetsho-ü Dianu	Grace W. Ezüng	Bendangkokla Aier	
2017	Marina Kiho	Ruopfüzhano Whiso	Pewe-ü Tünyi	
2016	Vilokali Zhimomi	Chuichang	Shenili Chishi	
2015	Nenghoilhing Hangsing	Alica Zhimomi	Yangerjungla Pongen	
2014	Veineinem Singson	Kaheli Chophy	Mülüvesalü Keyho	
2013	Benjongmenla Jamir	Abeni W. Khüvüng	Shürhosenuo Yano	
2012	Imlibenla Wati	Dovine Venüh	Semersungla	
2011	Vetolü Dawhuo	Imnüksungla	Wankam Konyak	
2010	Hattineng Hangsing	Virieno Zakiesato	Tsukoli Kinimi	
2009	Esther Natso			
2008	Abin Kuki	Nyeie Leinak Phom	Chumlano Kikon	
2007	Imsülemla Aier	Yanbeni	Nüvolü	
2006	Akümnaro			
2005	Tiarenla Jamir			
2004	Regina Rongmei			
2003	Sentila Pongen			
2002	Bendangrenla			
2001	Hotoli Swu			
2000	Akuonuo Khezhie			
1999	Caroline Sümi			
1998	Tokatoli Shohe			
1997	Vesakulü Asaku Veyie			
1996	Ellen Konyak			
1995	Adule Mero			
1994	Margaret Rongmei			
1993	Imtisangla			
1992	Rachel Imchen			
1991	Lipono			
1990	Anjuna Sahi			
1989	Lipokla			

== Events ==
=== Miss Nagaland 2023 ===
The 34th edition of the Miss Nagaland pageant was held on 8 December 2023 at the Capital Cultural Centre, Kohima. This edition marked the first time the Beauty and Aesthetics Society of Nagaland officially partnered with a national pageant organisation; a representative of the Glamanand Group attended the event as part of the jury. Subsequently, Neiketuno Sechü who was crowned the winner secured the right to represent Nagaland at the Miss Grand India pageant, held on August 11, 2024.

==== Final results ====
Result	Contestant	Note(s)
Miss Nagaland 2023	Neiketuno Sechü	Top 8, Miss Grand India 2024
1st Runner Up	Vimgha Sheqi	Top 5, Femina Miss India Nagaland 2024
2nd Runner Up	Ilihika Aye	

==== Sub-title awards ====
Result	Contestant
Miss Beautiful Smile	Tsiawavi Nyuwi
Miss Multimedia	Vimgha Sheqi
Miss Perfect 10	Neiketuno Sechü
Miss Photogenic	Ilihika Aye
Miss Talent	Flora Kent
Miss Beautiful Skin	Keziah Mero
Queen of Hearts	Katienla P Longchar

=== Miss Nagaland 2022 ===
The 33rd edition of the Miss Nagaland pageant was held on 9 December 2022 at the Capital Cultural Centre, Kohima. Hikali Achumi from Zunheboto was crowned the winner at the end of the event.

==== Final results ====
Result	Contestant	Note(s)
Miss Nagaland 2022	Hikali Achumi	Top 5, Femina Miss India Nagaland 2023
1st Runner Up	Kenei Ritse	Miss Northeast 2023
2nd Runner Up	Jentiren Jamir	Femina Miss India Nagaland 2024

==== Sub-title awards ====
Result	Contestant	Note(s)
Miss Beautiful Smile	Hikali Achumi	
Miss Multimedia	Hikali Achumi	
Miss Perfect 10	Chochoi Lhoujem	
Miss Photogenic	Kenei Ritse	
Miss Talent	Ketou-u Pfusenuo	Top 5, Femina Miss India Nagaland 2023
Miss Beautiful Skin	Jentiren Jamir	
Queen of Hearts	Linovi P Kiba	

=== Miss Nagaland 2021 ===
Following a hiatus in 2020 when Miss Nagaland could not take place owing to the COVID-19 pandemic, the 32nd edition of the pageant was held on 20 December 2021 at the Regional Centre of Excellence for Music & Performing Arts, Jotsoma, Kohima. Kawimaningsiliu Mharoni Khüvüng from Peren was crowned the winner at the end of the event.

The Miss Nagaland 2021 pageant marked the continuing 30th anniversary celebrations of the Beauty and Aesthetics Society of Nagaland.

==== Final results ====
Result	Contestant	Note(s)
Miss Nagaland 2021	Kawimaningsiliu Mharoni Khüvüng	Top 7, Femina Miss India Nagaland 2022
1st Runner Up	Lika Chophy	
2nd Runner Up	Lovi Awomi	Femina Miss India Nagaland 2022

==== Sub-title awards ====
Result	Contestant	Note(s)
Miss Beautiful Smile	Ezhoto-u Keyho	Femina Miss India Nagaland 2023
Miss Empower	Sharon Singson	
Miss Multimedia	Thejakhrienuo Nakhro and Naghophukali Swu	
Miss Perfect 10	Lika Chophy	
Miss Photogenic	Akumla Jamir	
Miss Talent	Kewasha Lorin	
Miss Beautiful Skin	Lovi Awomi	
Queen of Hearts	Kawimaningsiliu Mharoni Khüvüng	

=== Miss Nagaland 2019 ===
The 31st edition of the Miss Nagaland pageant was held on 9 December 2019 in Jotsoma, Kohima. Vikuonuo Sachü from Kohima was crowned the winner at the end of the event.

==== Final results ====
Result	Contestant	Note(s)
Miss Nagaland 2019	Vikuonuo Sachü	Top 7, Femina Miss India Nagaland 2022
1st Runner Up	Imnasangla Ao	Top 5, Femina Miss India Nagaland 2020
2nd Runner Up	Viphrotsüno Kehie	

==== Sub-title awards ====
Result	Contestant
Miss Beautiful Smile	Viphrotsüno Kehie
Miss Empower	Imnasangla Ao
Miss Multimedia	Akumla Imsong
Miss Perfect 10	Viphrotsüno Kehie
Miss Photogenic	Shefüvi Pfithu
Miss Talent	Neisevono Zashümo
Best Evening Gown	Gimlule
Queen of Hearts	Khrielievinuo Suohu

=== Miss Nagaland 2018 ===
The 30th edition of the Miss Nagaland pageant was held on 9 December 2018 at Jotsoma, Kohima. Mewetsho-ü Dianu from Phek was crowned the winner at the end of the event.

==== Final results ====
Result	Contestant
Miss Nagaland 2018	Mewetsho-ü Dianu
1st Runner Up	Grace W. Ezüng
2nd Runner Up	Bendangkokla Aier

==== Sub-title awards ====
Award	Contestant
Miss Empower	Tsuniholi
Miss Multimedia	Martola
Miss Perfect 10	Mewetsho-ü Dianu
Miss Photogenic	Aka Achümi
Miss Talent	Neingainem Kuki
Best Evening Gown	Vekhotolü Lohe
Queen of Hearts	Vekhotolü Lohe

=== Miss Nagaland 2017 ===
The 29th edition of the Miss Nagaland pageant was held on 8 December 2017 at Jotsoma, Kohima. 12 contestants competed for the title. Marina Kiho from Dimapur was crowned the winner at the end of the event.

The photo-shoot of the contestants was directed by Ketholeno Kense Vihienuo, Indian supermodel from Nagaland and a recipient of the Vogue India and Colours Infinity Young Achiever of the Year award at Vogue Women of the Year 2017.

==== Final results ====
Result	Contestant	Note(s)
Miss Nagaland 2017	Marina Kiho	Femina Miss India Nagaland 2019
1st Runner Up	Ruopfüzhano Whiso	Miss Universe Nagaland 2024 Femina Miss India Nagaland 2018
2nd Runner Up	Pewe-ü Tünyi	

==== Sub-title awards ====
Award	Contestant
BBlunt Miss Beautiful Hair	Marina Kiho
Miss Empower	Ruopfüzhano Whiso
Miss Perfect 10	Pelevinuo Rüpreo
Miss Photogenic	Sanglitola Chang
Miss Talent	Sanglitola Chang
Queen of Hearts	Pewe-ü Tünyi

=== Miss Nagaland 2016 ===
The 28th edition of the Miss Nagaland pageant was held on 8 December 2016 at Jotsoma, Kohima. 14 contestants vied for the title which was ultimately won by Vilokali Zhimomi of Dimapur.

The Beauty and Aesthetics Society of Nagaland held its 25 years celebrations to coincide with the 2016 edition of the pageant.

==== Final results ====
Result	Contestant	Note(s)
Miss Nagaland 2016	Vilokali Zhimomi	Top 3, Femina Miss India Nagaland 2017
1st Runner Up	Chuichang	
2nd Runner Up	Shenili Chishi	

==== Sub-title awards ====
Award	Contestant
Miss Congeniality	Ngapkhao Konyak
Miss Perfect 10	Vilokali Zhimomi
Miss Photogenic	Vilokali Zhimomi
Miss Talent	Chuichang

=== Miss Nagaland 2015 ===
The 27th edition of the Miss Nagaland pageant was held on 9 December 2015 at Jotsoma, Kohima, where Nenghoilhing Hangsing was crowned the winner at the end of the event.

==== Final results ====
Result	Contestant
Miss Nagaland 2015	Nenghoilhing Hangsing
1st Runner Up	Alica Zhimomi
2nd Runner Up	Yangerjungla Pongen

==== Sub-title awards ====
Award	Contestant
Miss Perfect 10	Yangerjungla Pongen
Miss Photogenic	Nenghoilhing Hangsing
Miss Talent	Shanchobeni Y. Jungio
Queen of Hearts	Zehovire Avi Kechü

=== Miss Nagaland 2014 ===
The 26th edition of the Miss Nagaland pageant was held on 7 November 2014 at Jotsoma, Kohima, where Veineinem Singsong of Dimapur was crowned the winner at the end of the event.

==== Final results ====
Result	Contestant	Note(s)
Miss Nagaland 2014	Veineinem Singson	
1st Runner Up	Kaheli Chophy	Femina Miss India Nagaland 2017 1st Runner Up, Eclectic Model Hunt 2015
2nd Runner Up	Mülüvesalü Keyho	

==== Sub-title awards ====
Award	Contestant
Miss Perfect 10	Teisovinuo
Miss Photogenic	Mülüvesalü Keyho
Miss Talent	L.C Paunen
Queen of Hearts	B. Sangki Konyak

=== Miss Nagaland 2013 ===
The 25th edition of the Miss Nagaland pageant was held on 8 December 2013 at the capital of Nagaland, Kohima, Kohima. 18 contestants vied for the title. Benjongmenla Jamir was crowned the winner by the previous year's winner Imlibenla Jamir.

==== Final results ====
Result	Contestant
Miss Nagaland 2013	Benjongmenla Jamir
1st Runner Up	Abeny W Khüvüng
2nd Runner Up	Shürhosenuo Yano

=== Miss Nagaland 2012 ===
The 24th edition of the Miss Nagaland pageant was held on 6 December 2012 at the state capital Kohima. Imlibenla Jamir of Mokokchung bested 18 other contestants to win the crown.

==== Final results ====
Result	Contestant	Note(s)
Miss Nagaland 2012	Imlibenla Jamir (Imlibenla Wati)	Runner Up, Miss Supertalent of the World 2016 1st Runner Up (Miss World Beauty India), Miss India Elite 2015
1st Runner Up	Dovine Venüh	
2nd Runner Up	Semersungla	

==== Sub-title awards ====
Award	Contestant
Mary Kay Miss Beautiful Skin	Semersungla
Miss Congeniality	Marlyne K. Zhimomi
Miss Perfect 10	Imlibenla Jamir
Miss Photogenic	Kenei Rakho
Eastern Mirror Readers' Choice Award	Imlibenla Jamir

=== Miss Nagaland 2011 ===
The 23rd edition of the Miss Nagaland pageant was held on 6 December 2011 at the state capital Kohima. 15 contestants competed for the crown, which was won by Vetolü Dawhuo of Phek.

==== Final results ====
Result	Contestant
Miss Nagaland 2011	Vetolü Dawhuo
1st Runner Up	Imnüksungla
2nd Runner Up	Wankam Konyak

==== Sub-title awards ====
Award	Contestant
Miss Beautiful Skin	Noibenkupling Nyam
Miss Congeniality	Noibenkupling Nyam
Miss Perfect 10	Nyembo Konyak
Miss Photogenic	Kajenkala Longchar
Readers' Choice Award	Sentirenla Ozüküm

=== Miss Nagaland 2010 ===
The 22nd edition of the Miss Nagaland pageant was held in December 2010 at the state capital Kohima, where Hattinneng Hangsing of Peren was declared the winner at the end of the event.

==== Final results ====
Result	Contestant
Miss Nagaland 2010	Hattinneng Hangsing
1st Runner Up	Virieno Zakiesato
2nd Runner Up	Tsukoli Kinimi

==== Sub-title awards ====
Award	Contestant
Mary Kay Miss Beautiful Skin	Mughali Kinimi
Miss Congeniality	Mughali Kinimi
Miss Perfect 10	K. Limei Phom
Miss Photogenic	Alemla Chang
Eastern Mirror Viewers' Choice Award	Virieno Zakiesato

=== Miss Nagaland 2009 ===
Result	Contestant
Miss Nagaland 2009	Esther Natso

=== Miss Nagaland 2008 ===
The 20th edition of the Miss Nagaland pageant was held in December 2008 at the state capital Kohima. 13 contestants vied for the title which was won by Abin Kuki.

==== Final results ====
Result	Contestant
Miss Nagaland 2008	Abin Kuki
1st Runner Up	Nyeie Leinak Phom
2nd Runner Up	Chumlano Kikon

==== Sub-title awards ====
Award	Contestant
Miss Beautiful Skin	Chumlano Kikon
Miss Congeniality	Nyeie Leinak Phom
Miss Perfect 10	Chumlano Kikon
Miss Photogenic	Reema Zeliang
Eastern Mirror Readers' Choice Award	Moakala Phom

=== Miss Nagaland 2007 ===
Result	Contestant
Miss Nagaland 2007	Imsülemla Aier

=== Miss Nagaland 2006 ===
Result	Contestant	Note(s)
Miss Nagaland 2006	Akümnaro	2nd Runner Up, Miss Northeast 2009

=== Miss Nagaland 2005 ===
Result	Contestant	Note(s)
Miss Nagaland 2005	Tiarenla Jamir	Miss Jatropha Northeast 2006

=== Miss Nagaland 2004 ===
Result	Contestant
Miss Nagaland 2004	Regina Rongmei

=== Miss Nagaland 2003 ===
Result	Contestant	Note(s)
Miss Nagaland 2003	Sentila Pongen	2nd Runner Up, Miss Northeast 2004

=== Miss Nagaland 2002 ===
Result	Contestant
Miss Nagaland 2002	Bendangrenla

=== Miss Nagaland 2001 ===
Result	Contestant
Miss Nagaland 2001	Hotoli Swu

=== Miss Nagaland 2000 ===
Result	Contestant	Note(s)
Miss Nagaland 2000	Akuonuo Khezhie	Contestant, Femina Miss India 2007

=== Miss Nagaland 1999 ===
Result	Contestant
Miss Nagaland 1999	Caroline Sümi

=== Miss Nagaland 1998 ===
Result	Contestant
Miss Nagaland 1998	Tokatoli Shohe

=== Miss Nagaland 1997 ===
Result	Contestant	Note(s)
Miss Nagaland 1997	Vesakulü Asaku Veyie	Miss Northeast 1997

=== Miss Nagaland 1996 ===
Result	Contestant
Miss Nagaland 1996	Ellen Konyak

=== Miss Nagaland 1995 ===
Result	Contestant	Note(s)
Miss Nagaland 1995	Adule Mero	Finalist, Miss Northeast 1996

=== Miss Nagaland 1994 ===
Result	Contestant
Miss Nagaland 1994	Margaret Rongmei

=== Miss Nagaland 1993 ===
Result	Contestant
Miss Nagaland 1993	Imtisangla

=== Miss Nagaland 1992 ===
Result	Contestant	Note(s)
Miss Nagaland 1992	Rachel Imchen	Miss East India 1995

=== Miss Nagaland 1991 ===
Result	Contestant
Miss Nagaland 1991	Lipono

=== Miss Nagaland 1990 ===
Result	Contestant
Miss Nagaland 1990	Anjuna Sahi

=== Miss Nagaland 1989 ===
Result	Contestant	Note(s)
Miss Nagaland 1989	Lipokla	2nd Runner Up, Miss Northeast 1989

== See also ==
- Miss India (disambiguation) – list of pageants associated with the name, and other uses
