= Satish Krishna Sail =

Indian politician (born 1966)

Member of the Karnataka Legislative Assembly
- In office 13 May 2023 – 26 October 2024
- Preceded by: Roopali Naik
- In office 17 May 2013 – 15 May 2018
- Preceded by: Anand Asnotikar
- Succeeded by: Roopali Naik

Personal details
- Party: Indian National Congress
- Relations: Sadhvi Sail (Daughter)

Satish Krishna Sail (born 1966) is an Indian politician from Karnataka. He is a Member of the Karnataka Legislative Assembly from Karwar Assembly constituency in Uttara Kannada district. He won the 2023 Karnataka Legislative Assembly election representing Indian National Congress.

He is the father of Sadhvi Sail, an Indian beauty pageant titleholder.

Satish Sail was convicted in illegal export of seized iron ore from Belekeri port in 2024. In September 2025, he was arrested by the ED in the Belekeri iron ore case.

He was appointed chairman for Karnataka Marketing Consultant and Agencies Corporation on 26 January 2024.

== Early life and education ==
Sail is from Karwar, Uttara Kannada district. His father's name is Krishna Shambha Sail. He completed his B.Sc. in 1992 at Government Arts and Science College, Karwar.

== Career ==
Sail won from Karwar Assembly constituency representing Indian National Congress in the 2023 Karnataka Legislative Assembly election. He polled 77,445 votes and defeated his nearest rival, Roopali Naik of Bharatiya Janata Party, by a narrow margin of 2,138 votes. He lost the 2018 Karnataka Legislative Assembly election finishing third behind winner Roopali Naik of BJP and Anand Vasant Asnotikar of JD (S). He became an MLA for the first time winning the 2013 Karnataka Legislative Assembly election as an independent candidate.
