= Karwar Assembly constituency =

Legislative Assembly constituency in Karnataka State, India

Coordinates: 14.82°N 74.14°E

Karwar
- Constituency No. 77 for the Karnataka Legislative Assembly

Constituency details
- Country: India
- Region: South India
- State: Karnataka
- District: Uttara Kannada
- Lok Sabha constituency: Uttara Kannada
- Established: 1956
- Total electors: 219,544
- Reservation: None

Karwar Assembly constituency is one of the 224 Legislative Assembly constituencies of Karnataka in India.

It is part of Uttara Kannada district. Satish Krishna Sail is the Member of legislative assembly from Karwar.

== Members of the Legislative Assembly ==
Election	Member	Party
1957	Gaonkar Sakharam Dattatray	Indian National Congress
1962	Balsu Pursu Kadam	Maharashtra Ekikaran Samiti
1967	K. D. Purso	Independent politician
1972	Balsu Pursu Kadam	Indian National Congress
1978	Waingankar Dattatraya Vithu	Indian National Congress
1983	Rane Prabhakar Sadashiv	Indian National Congress
1985	Rane Prabhakar Sadashiv	Indian National Congress
1989	Rane Prabhakar Sadashiv	Indian National Congress
1994	Asnotikar Vasanth Kamalakar	Karnataka Pradesh Congress Committee
1999	Asnotikar Vasanth Kamalakar	Indian National Congress
2004	Bhat Gangadhar Nagesh	Bharatiya Janata Party
2008	Anand Asnotikar	Indian National Congress
2013	Satish Krishna Sail	Independent politician
2018	Roopali Naik	Bharatiya Janata Party
2023	Satish Krishna Sail	Indian National Congress

== Election results ==
=== Assembly Election 2023 ===
2023 Karnataka Legislative Assembly election : Karwar
Party	Candidate	Votes	%	±%
INC	Satish Krishna Sail	77,445	47.15%	▲19.00
BJP	Roopali Santosh Naik	75,307	45.84%	▲8.15
JD(S)	Chaitra Chandrahas Kotharkar	2,918	1.78%	▼27.12
Independent	Bhat Gangadhar	2,235	1.36%	New
NOTA	None of the above	1,773	1.08%	▼0.39
AAP	Ashish Prabhakar Gaonkar	1,382	0.84%	New
Margin of victory		2,138	1.30%	▼7.48
Turnout		164,317	74.84%	▲1.07
Total valid votes		164,267		
Registered electors		219,544		▲0.75
INC gain from BJP		Swing	▲9.46	

=== Assembly Election 2018 ===
2018 Karnataka Legislative Assembly election : Karwar
Party	Candidate	Votes	%	±%
BJP	Roopali Naik	60,339	37.69%	▲1.60
JD(S)	Anand Asnotikar	46,275	28.90%	▲27.64
INC	Satish Krishna Sail	45,071	28.15%	▲17.88
NCP	Madhav Babu Nayak	3,751	2.34%	New
NOTA	None of the above	2,359	1.47%	New
Rashtriya Jansambhavna Party	Kundabai Parulekar	1,617	1.01%	New
Margin of victory		14,064	8.78%	▼20.10
Turnout		160,763	73.77%	▲3.07
Total valid votes		160,098		
Registered electors		217,910		▲5.87
BJP gain from Independent		Swing	▼27.28	

=== Assembly Election 2013 ===
2013 Karnataka Legislative Assembly election : Karwar
Party	Candidate	Votes	%	±%
Independent	Satish Krishna Sail	80,727	64.97%	New
BJP	Anand Asnotikar	44,847	36.09%	▲19.28
INC	Ramanand Bommayya Nayak	12,756	10.27%	▼30.59
JD(S)	Dr. Sanju Nayak	1,568	1.26%	▼0.34
KJP	Anthon V. Fernandes	1,108	0.89%	New
Independent	Sail Shrikant Ganapati	1,009	0.81%	New
Independent	Sanjay Baburao Naik	880	0.71%	New
Margin of victory		35,880	28.88%	▲11.92
Turnout		145,523	70.70%	▲7.24
Total valid votes		124,257		
Registered electors		205,831		▲12.31
Independent gain from INC		Swing	▲24.11	

=== Assembly Election 2008 ===
2008 Karnataka Legislative Assembly election : Karwar
Party	Candidate	Votes	%	±%
INC	Anand Asnotikar	47,477	40.86%	▲25.64
Independent	Ganapati Dumma Ulvekar	27,768	23.90%	New
BJP	Prasad Karwarkar	19,537	16.81%	▼28.38
SP	R. G. Naik	11,689	10.06%	New
Independent	Bhat Gangadhar Nagesh	5,303	4.56%	New
JD(S)	P. N. Kuvalekar	1,862	1.60%	▼23.44
Swarna Yuga Party	Leo Francis B. Lewis	964	0.83%	New
Rashtriya Hindustan Sena Karnataka	Ramadas Giriya Kudtarkar	812	0.70%	New
BSP	Sandhya Santosh Anavekar	787	0.68%	New
Margin of victory		19,709	16.96%	▼3.19
Turnout		116,297	63.46%	▲3.48
Total valid votes		116,199		
Registered electors		183,273		▲36.25
INC gain from BJP		Swing	▼4.33	

=== Assembly Election 2004 ===
2004 Karnataka Legislative Assembly election : Karwar
Party	Candidate	Votes	%	±%
BJP	Bhat Gangadhar Nagesh	36,397	45.19%	▲6.75
JD(S)	Prabhakar. S. Rane	20,165	25.04%	▲20.72
INC	Ashok Shankar Naik	12,260	15.22%	▼42.02
JP	Dr. Gajender K. Nayak	5,046	6.27%	New
AITC	Leo Francis B. Lewis	4,746	5.89%	New
Kannada Nadu Party	Preetam Jayaram Masurkar	1,925	2.39%	New
Margin of victory		16,232	20.15%	▲1.36
Turnout		80,677	59.98%	▼3.37
Total valid votes		80,539		
Registered electors		134,509		▲10.81
BJP gain from INC		Swing	▼12.05	

=== Assembly Election 1999 ===
1999 Karnataka Legislative Assembly election : Karwar
Party	Candidate	Votes	%	±%
INC	Asnotikar Vasanth Kamalakar	42,502	57.24%	▲24.25
BJP	Prabhakar. S. Rane	28,546	38.44%	▲26.19
JD(S)	Malsekar Prabhakar Sairu	3,208	4.32%	New
Margin of victory		13,956	18.79%	▲3.32
Turnout		76,899	63.35%	▼0.01
Total valid votes		74,256		
Rejected ballots		2,602	3.38%	▲1.40
Registered electors		121,383		▲9.47
INC gain from INC		Swing	▲8.78	

=== Assembly Election 1994 ===
1994 Karnataka Legislative Assembly election : Karwar
Party	Candidate	Votes	%	±%
INC	Asnotikar Vasanth Kamalakar	33,367	48.46%	New
INC	Prabhakar. S. Rane	22,715	32.99%	▼20.99
BJP	Revankar Mahadev	8,433	12.25%	▲6.38
JD	Jyoti Gurunath Naik	3,230	4.69%	▼23.93
Margin of victory		10,652	15.47%	▼9.88
Turnout		70,257	63.36%	▲1.67
Total valid votes		68,853		
Rejected ballots		1,394	1.98%	▼3.99
Registered electors		110,883		▲2.89
INC gain from INC		Swing	▼5.52	

=== Assembly Election 1989 ===
1989 Karnataka Legislative Assembly election : Karwar
Party	Candidate	Votes	%	±%
INC	Rane Prabhakar Sadashiv	33,741	53.98%	▲9.03
JD	Arvind Vithoba Tendulkar	17,893	28.62%	New
JP	Naik Gajendra Krishna	4,635	7.41%	New
BJP	Pawar Ravindra Narayan	3,670	5.87%	New
Kranti Sabha	Desai Vithoba Gangapati	1,447	2.31%	New
Independent	Savant Maruthi Mahabaleshwar	670	1.07%	New
Independent	Khargekar Anand Rao Kalyani	454	0.73%	New
Margin of victory		15,848	25.35%	▲16.84
Turnout		66,479	61.69%	▲2.27
Total valid votes		62,510		
Rejected ballots		3,969	5.97%	▲4.53
Registered electors		107,765		▲24.08
INC hold		Swing	▲9.03	

=== Assembly Election 1985 ===
1985 Karnataka Legislative Assembly election : Karwar
Party	Candidate	Votes	%	±%
INC	Rane Prabhakar Sadashiv	22,867	44.95%	▲2.67
JP	Naik Mota Teku	18,537	36.44%	New
Independent	Kalgutakar Vishnu Bhikare	8,711	17.12%	New
Independent	Gaonkar Mohanray Anant	753	1.48%	New
Margin of victory		4,330	8.51%	▼10.10
Turnout		51,610	59.42%	▼2.30
Total valid votes		50,868		
Rejected ballots		742	1.44%	▼0.69
Registered electors		86,853		▲2.42
INC hold		Swing	▲2.67	

=== Assembly Election 1983 ===
1983 Karnataka Legislative Assembly election : Karwar
Party	Candidate	Votes	%	±%
INC	Rane Prabhakar Sadashiv	21,657	42.28%	▲37.21
Independent	Naik Mota Teku	12,123	23.67%	New
Independent	Desai Vithoba Uttam	8,708	17.00%	New
BJP	Pikle Saripad Ramachandra	8,532	16.66%	New
Margin of victory		9,534	18.61%	▲13.71
Turnout		52,343	61.72%	▼4.31
Total valid votes		51,226		
Rejected ballots		1,117	2.13%	▼0.52
Registered electors		84,803		▲9.48
INC gain from INC(I)		Swing	▼1.99	

=== Assembly Election 1978 ===
1978 Karnataka Legislative Assembly election : Karwar
Party	Candidate	Votes	%	±%
INC(I)	Waingankar Dattatraya Vithu	22,044	44.27%	New
JP	Gaonkar Sakharam Dattatray	19,602	39.37%	New
Independent	Naik Vishwanath Ramchandra	2,858	5.74%	New
Independent	Dhume Mukund Shiwram	2,763	5.55%	New
INC	Desai Vishwanath Bomma	2,525	5.07%	▼46.21
Margin of victory		2,442	4.90%	▼24.78
Turnout		51,149	66.03%	▲5.63
Total valid votes		49,792		
Rejected ballots		1,357	2.65%	▲2.65
Registered electors		77,461		▲20.45
INC(I) gain from INC		Swing	▼7.01	

=== Assembly Election 1972 ===
1972 Mysore State Legislative Assembly election : Karwar
Party	Candidate	Votes	%	±%
INC	Kadam Balsu Purso	19,195	51.28%	▲13.93
ABJS	Krishnapur Charu Demu	8,084	21.59%	New
Independent	Desai Vishwanath Bomma	5,552	14.83%	New
CPI(M)	Pawar Gopinath Vithoba	3,242	8.66%	New
Independent	Dhume Mukund Shiwram	1,362	3.64%	New
Margin of victory		11,111	29.68%	▲4.38
Turnout		38,841	60.40%	▼6.55
Total valid votes		37,435		
Registered electors		64,309		▲11.81
INC gain from Independent		Swing	▼11.37	

=== Assembly Election 1967 ===
1967 Mysore State Legislative Assembly election : Karwar
Party	Candidate	Votes	%	±%
Independent	K. D. Purso	23,079	62.65%	New
INC	G. S. Dattatraya	13,759	37.35%	▼0.99
Margin of victory		9,320	25.30%	▲1.98
Turnout		38,508	66.95%	▲9.02
Total valid votes		36,838		
Registered electors		57,518		▼4.02
Independent gain from MES		Swing	▲0.99	

=== Assembly Election 1962 ===
1962 Mysore State Legislative Assembly election : Karwar
Party	Candidate	Votes	%	±%
MES	Balsu Pursu Kadam	20,510	61.66%	New
INC	Anant Gundu Bale	12,752	38.34%	▲0.57
Margin of victory		7,758	23.32%	▲21.75
Turnout		34,718	57.93%	▼1.33
Total valid votes		33,262		
Registered electors		59,930		▲13.38
MES gain from INC		Swing	▲23.89	

=== Assembly Election 1957 ===
1957 Mysore State Legislative Assembly election : Karwar
Party	Candidate	Votes	%	±%
INC	Gaonkar Sakharam Dattatray	11,832	37.77%	New
Independent	Pawar Gopinath Vithoba	11,340	36.20%	New
PSP	Kadam Balsu Purso	4,758	15.19%	New
Independent	Naik Krishna Narayan	3,394	10.84%	New
Margin of victory		492	1.57%	
Turnout		31,324	59.26%	
Total valid votes		31,324		
Registered electors		52,857		
INC win (new seat)				

== See also ==
- List of constituencies of the Karnataka Legislative Assembly
- Uttara Kannada district
