= Roopali Naik =

Indian politician

Member of the Karnataka Legislative Assembly
- In office 2018–2023
- Constituency: Karwar

Personal details
- Born: 15 May 1972 (age 53) Mysore state, India
- Party: Bharatiya Janata Party

Roopali Naik (born 1972) is an Indian politician from Karnataka. She is a former member of the Karnataka Legislative Assembly from Karwar Assembly constituency in Uttara Kannada district. She last won the 2018 Karnataka Legislative Assembly election from Karwar representing the Bharatiya Janata Party.

== Early life and education ==
Naik is from Karwar, Uttara Kannada district, Karnataka. She married Santosh Naik. She studied Class 10 at the Popular New English School, Chendiya, Karwar, and passed the examinations in the year 1989. She is into transport business and her husband is a contractor.

== Career ==
Naik won the 2018 Karnataka Legislative Assembly election from Karwar Assembly constituency representing the Bharatiya Janata Party. She polled 60,339 votes and defeated her nearest rival Anand Asnotikar of Janata Dal (Secular), by a margin of 14,064 votes. She contested again on the BJP ticket but lost the seat to Satish Krishna Sail of the Indian National Congress by a margin of 2,138 votes in the 2023 Karnataka Legislative Assembly election.
