= Miss Diva 2015 =

3rd edition of Miss Diva

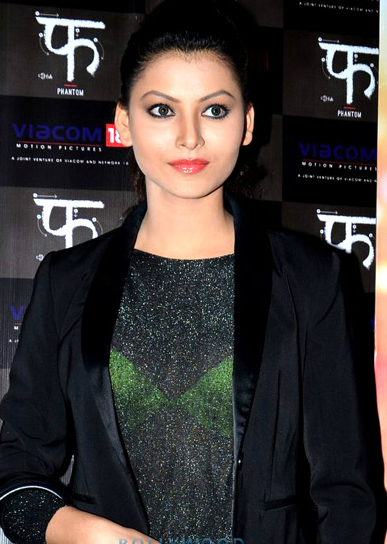
- Urvashi Rautela
- Date: October 14, 2015
- Presenters: Cyrus Sahukar
- Entertainment: Alankrita Sahai, Elli Avram, Gurmeet Choudhary, Salman Yusuff Khan
- Venue: Sahara Star, Mumbai, India
- Broadcaster: Zee Cafe, Zoom, Romedy Now
- Entrants: 16
- Placements: 6
- Winner: Urvashi Rautela
- Congeniality: Pooja Bisht
- Photogenic: Hemali Soni

The grand finale of the third edition of Miss Diva was held on October 14, 2015. 16 contestants vied for the title and the chance to represent India at the Miss Universe beauty pageant. Urvashi Rautela was crowned Miss Diva 2015, while Natasha Assadi and Naveli Deshmukh were crowned 1st and 2nd Runners Up respectively. The pageant was aired on Romedy Now from 12 October to 18 October 2015. It was also telecast on Zoom and Zee Cafe.

Urvashi Rautela represented India at the Miss Universe 2015 pageant held on December 20, 2015 in the United States.

== Participants ==
=== Finalists ===
Contestant	Age	Height	State	Status
Aarushi Sharma	19	1.68 m (5 ft 6 in)	Delhi	
Aileena Catherine Amon	23	1.73 m (5 ft 8 in)	Kerala	Top 6
Aishwarya Dhavale	20	1.71 m (5 ft 7 1/2 in)	Maharashtra	Top 6
Ankita Thite	23	1.70 m (5 ft 7 in)	Maharashtra	
Hemali Soni	19	1.73 m (5 ft 8 in)	Maharashtra	Top 6
Hida Siddique	26	1.77 m (5 ft 9 1/2 in)	Delhi	
Nancy Gupta	26	1.74 m (5 ft 8 1/2 in)	Himachal Pradesh	
Natasha Assadi	23	1.73 m (5 ft 8 in)	Bangalore	1st Runner Up
Naveli Deshmukh	19	1.73 m (5 ft 8 in)	Maharashtra	2nd Runner Up
Simran Khandelwal	19	1.73 m (5 ft 8 in)	Madhya Pradesh	
Urvashi Rautela	21	1.70 m (5 ft 7 in)	Uttarakhand	Winner

=== Preliminary round ===
Contestant	Age	Height	State	Status
Rashi Yadav	23	1.76 m (5 ft 9 1/2 in)	New Delhi	Eliminated in Episode 2
Shivani Shetty	21	1.71 m (5 ft 7 1/2 in)	Maharashtra	Eliminated in Episode 3
Apoorva Sharma	22	1.70 m (5 ft 7 in)	Rajasthan	Eliminated in Episode 3
Pooja Bisht	26	1.70 m (5 ft 7 in)	Uttarakhand	Eliminated in Episode 4
Shivani Jadhav	19	1.73 m (5 ft 8 in)	Chhattisgarh	Eliminated in Episode 5

== Judges ==
- Irrfan Khan, Indian actor
- Kangana Ranaut, Indian actress and model
- Lara Dutta, Indian actress, model and Miss Universe 2000
- Nikhil Mehra, Indian fashion designer
- Shantanu Mehra, Indian fashion designer
- Vikas Bahl, Indian film producer, screenwriter and director

== Crossovers & Returnees ==
Miss Diva

- 2021: Naveli Deshmukh (Unplaced)

Femina Miss India

- 2019: Shivani Jadhav(Miss India Grand International 2019)
- 2015: Naveli Deshmukh(TOP 10)
