= Femina Miss India 2019 =

Beauty pageant edition

- Date: 15 June 2019
- Presenters: Karan Johar; Manushi Chhillar; Manish Paul
- Entertainment: Katrina Kaif; Vicky Kaushal; Mouni Roy; Nora Fatehi
- Venue: Sardar Vallabhbhai Patel Indoor Stadium, Mumbai
- Broadcaster: Colors TV
- Entrants: 30
- Placements: 12
- Winner: Suman Rao; Rajasthan
- Congeniality: Lalnunthari Rualhleng; Mizoram
- Photogenic: Vaishnavi Andhale; Maharashtra

Femina Miss India 2019 was the 56th edition of the Femina Miss India beauty pageant. It was held at Sardar Vallabhbhai Patel Indoor Stadium, Mumbai on June 15, 2019, and was hosted by Karan Johar, Manish Paul and Miss World 2017, Manushi Chhillar. At the end of the event, Anukreethy Vas of Tamil Nadu crowned Suman Rao of Rajasthan as her successor. She represented India at Miss World 2019 in London and placed 2nd Runner Up.

Meenakshi Chaudhary of Haryana crowned Shivani Jadhav of Chhattisgarh as Miss Grand India 2019. Gayatri Bhardwaj of New Delhi crowned Shreya Shanker of Bihar as Miss United Continents India 2019. Shreya Rao Kamavarapu of Andhra Pradesh sashed Sanjana Vij of Telangana as Runner-Up at the end of the event. From this batch also, the winner of Miss Universe 2021 Harnaaz Sandhu made it to the top 12.

== Results ==
Color keys

For regional group:	For international placement:
E East Zone	The contestant won in an international pageant.
N North Zone	The contestant was a runner-up in an international pageant.
S South Zone	The contestant was a semi-finalist in an international pageant.
W West Zone	Unplaced

Final Results	Candidate	International Placement
Miss India 2019	W Rajasthan - Suman Rao	2nd Runner-up
Miss India Grand International 2019	E Chhattisgarh - Shivani Jadhav	Unplaced
Miss India United Continents 2019	E Bihar - Shreya Shanker	Unplaced
Runner up	S Telangana - Sanjana Vij	
Top 6	E Assam- Jyotishmita Baruah; N Uttar Pradesh - Shinata Chauhan	
Top 12	W Gujarat - Manasi Taxak; N Madhya Pradesh - Garima Yadav; W Maharashtra - Vaishnavi Andhale; E Mizoram - Lalnunthari Rualhleng; N Punjab - Harnaaz Sandhu; N Uttarakhand - Siddhi Gupta	

== Background ==
There are four regions under which the contestants are grouped - North, South, East and West. Mentors will train contestants for the finale.

- East Zone & West Zone - Neha Dhupia - Femina Miss India Universe 2002
- North & South Zone - Dia Mirza - Miss Asia Pacific 2000

== Sub Title Awards ==
Award	Contestant
Miss Multimedia	Uttarakhand -Siddhi Gupta
Cox & Kings Miss Getaway Goddess	Nagaland - Marina Kiho
Beauty with a Purpose	Kerala - Lakshmi Menon
Sephora Miss Glamorous Look	Punjab - Harnaaz Kaur
Rajnigandha Pearls Miss Goodness Ambassador	Himachal Pradesh - Garima Verma
Centro Miss Rampwalk	Rajasthan - Suman Rao
Kodak Lens Miss Spectacular Eyes	Telangana - Sanjana Vij
Blossom Kochhar Aroma Magic Miss Glowing Skin	Punjab - Harnaaz Kaur
Rajnigandha Pearls Miss Beautiful Smile	Karnataka - Aashna Bisht
The Westin Miss Lifestyle	Tripura - Jayanti Reang
Triumph Miss Body Beautiful	Chhattisgarh - Shivani Jadhav
Glam Studios Miss Beautiful Hair	Maharashtra - Vaishnavi Andhale
Miss Active	Sikkim - Sang Doma Tamang
Bennett University Miss Iron Maiden	West Bengal - Sushmita Roy
fbb Miss Fashion Icon	Mizoram - Lalnunthari Rualhleng
Senco Gold Miss Shining Star	Uttarakhand - Siddhi Gupta
Dr. Tvacha Miss Photogenic	Maharashtra - Vaishnavi Andhale
Reliance Digital Miss Tech Beauty	Goa - Shaasthra Shetty
SaffronStays Miss Congeniality	Mizoram - Lalnunthari Rualhleng
Kara Miss Vivacious	Gujarat - Mansi Taxak
INIFD Miss Talented	Jammu & Kashmir - Megha Kaul; Haryana - Sonal Sharma

=== Bennett University Sports day ===
Category	Sport	Winner
Miss Smasher	Badminton	Telangana - Sanjana Vij
Miss Top Spin	Table Tennis	Andhra Pradesh - Nikita Tanwani
Miss Hooper	Basketball	Jammu and Kashmir - Megha Kaul
Miss Water Baby	Swimming	New Delhi - Mansi Sehgal
Miss Athlete	Athletics	Uttarakhand - Siddhi Gupta

== Zonal sub-contest winners ==
The following are the list of sub-contest award winners from each zones:

Category	East	North	South	West
SaffronStays Miss Congeniality	Jayanti Reang	Shefali Dhiman	Jane Thompson	Janki Bodiwala
Dr. Tvacha Miss Photogenic	Lalnunthari Rualhleng	Satakshi Bhanot	Sanjana Vij	Vaishnavi Andhale
Sephora Miss Glamorous Look	Jyotishmita Baruah	Garima Yadav	Shalini Menon	Yogita Bihani
fbb Miss Fashion Icon	Madhumita Das	Shinata Chauhan	Divita Rai	Phalguni Khanna
fbb Miss Talented	Sushmita Roy; Lalnunthari Rualhleng	Pragati Wahi	Tejaswini Manogna	Megha Kaul; Yogita Bihani
Kara Miss Vivacious	Tanvi Malhara	Siddhi Gupta	Jane Thompson	Rose Kundu
Rajnigandha Pearls Miss Goodness Ambassador	Neha Jha	Sweetaj	Anjali Schmuck	Dragana Andrade
Triumph Miss Body Beautiful	Arupa Rath	Shinata Chauhan	Divita Rai	Janki Bodiwala
Blossom Kochhar Aroma Magic Miss Glowing Skin	Sushmita Roy	Vidhi Giri	Manasa Varanasi	Mansi Singh
Senco Gold Miss Shining Star	Tamanna Vyas	Siddhi Gupta	Tejaswini Manogna	Falguni Khanna
Centro Miss Rampwalk	Snehapriya Roy	Shinata Chauhan	Divita Rai	Suman Rao

== Judges ==
Femina Miss India 2019 Award Night

- Dia Mirza — Miss Asia Pacific 2000
- Mukesh Chhabra — Indian Casting Director
- Neha Dhupia — Miss India Universe 2002

Miss India 2019 Grand Finale

- Vanessa Ponce — Miss World 2018
- Shane Peacock — Fashion Designer
- Falguni Peacock — Fashion Designer
- Dutee Chand — Sprinter
- Aayush Sharma — Actor
- Sunil Chhetri — Indian Footballer
- Chitrangada Singh — Actress
- Huma Qureshi — Actress
- Remo D'Souza — Choreographer and Director

== Contestants ==
The following is the list of the official delegates of Miss India 2019 representing 30 states of the country:

Color key

- Declared as Winner
- Ended as Runner-up
- Ended as one of the Finalists or Semi-finalists

Zone	State	Delegate	Age (Note: Ages at the time of the pageant)	Height	Placement	Note(s)
East	Arunachal Pradesh	Roshni Dada	20	1.70 m (5 ft 7 in)		Miss Arunachal 2019
East	Assam	Jyotishmita Baruah	19	1.70 m (5 ft 7 in)	Top 6	Previously Mega Miss North East 2018 - 2nd Runner-up
East	Bihar	Shreya Shanker	22	1.73 m (5 ft 8 in)	Femina Miss India United Continents 2019	
East	Chhattisgarh	Shivani Jadhav	23	1.73 m (5 ft 8 in)	Femina Miss Grand India 2019	Previously Miss Diva - 2015 - Preliminary contestant
East	Jharkhand	Chitrapriya Singh	18	1.71 m (5 ft 7 in)		fbb Campus Princess 2019 - Finalist
East	Manipur	Urmila Shagolsem	24	1.73 m (5 ft 8 in)		Previously North East Diva 2018 - Top 10; Previously Miss Manipur 2016 - 1st Runner-up
East	Meghalaya	Sangeeta Das	19	1.70 m (5 ft 7 in)		fbb Campus Princess 2019 - North East; Previously Miss Shillong 2018
East	Mizoram	Lalnunthari Rualhleng	25	1.75 m (5 ft 9 in)	Top 12	
East	Nagaland	Marina Kiho	22	1.73 m (5 ft 8 in)		Previously Miss Nagaland 2017
East	Odisha	Sheetal Sahu	24	1.73 m (5 ft 8 in)		
East	Sikkim	Sang Doma Tamang	19	1.70 m (5 ft 7 in)		Previously Miss Sikkim 2018 - Top 5
East	Tripura	Jayanti Reang	25	1.83 m (6 ft 0 in)		
East	West Bengal	Sushmita Roy	23	1.75 m (5 ft 9 in)		Previously Femina Miss India Kolkata 2016 - 1st Runner Up
North	Haryana	Sonal Sharma	22	1.73 m (5 ft 8 in)		
North	Himachal Pradesh	Garima Verma	23	1.68 m (5 ft 6 in)		
North	Jammu and Kashmir 1	Megha Kaul	25	1.71 m (5 ft 7 1/2 in)		
North	Madhya Pradesh	Garima Yadav	22	1.73 m (5 ft 8 in)	Top 12	Previously TGPC's Miss India 2018 - 1st Runner-up
North	New Delhi	Mansi Sehgal	19	1.73 m (5 ft 8 in)		Previously fbb Campus Princess 2019 - Finalist
North	Punjab	Harnaaz Kaur	19	1.76 m (5 ft 9 1/2 in)	Top 12	Previously Times Fresh Face 2018 Chandigarh; Miss Universe India 2021; Miss Universe 2021
North	Uttarakhand	Siddhi Gupta	23	1.75 m (5 ft 9 in)	Top 12	
North	Uttar Pradesh	Shinata Chauhan	19	1.73 m (5 ft 8 in)	Top 6	Previously Miss Teen Exquisite International 2018; Femina Miss India Uttar Pradesh 2022; Femina Miss India 2022 -[2nd Runner Up]
South	Andhra Pradesh	Nikita Tanwani	24	1.73 m (5 ft 8 in)		Previously TGPC's Miss India 2018
South	Karnataka	Aashna Bisht	24	1.71 m (5 ft 7 1/2 in)		
South	Kerala (Note: KERALA — Lakshmi Menon was appointed to compete at Femina Miss India 2019 by the Femina Miss India organisation, as a replacement to Jane Thompson, Femina Miss India Kerala 2019 due to personal reason. Lakshmi Menon was among the Top 3 finalists at the Femina Miss India Kerala 2019 auditions.)	Lakshmi Menon	24	1.70 m (5 ft 7 in)		Previously Pegasus Miss Queen of India 2018; Previously Pegasus Miss South India 2018
South	Tamil Nadu	Rubeiya S K	23	1.68 m (5 ft 6 in)		
South	Telangana	Sanjana Vij	23	1.68 m (5 ft 6 in)	Femina Miss India 2019 Runner Up	Previously fbb Campus Princess 2016 - Finalist
West	Goa	Shaasthra Shetty	22	1.70 m (5 ft 7 in)		fbb Campus Princess 2019 - Finalist
West	Gujarat	Mansi Taxak	21	1.78 m (5 ft 10 in)	Top 12	
West	Maharashtra	Vaishnavi Andhale	20	1.73 m (5 ft 8 in)	Top 12	
West	Rajasthan	Suman Rao	20	1.73 m (5 ft 8 in)	Femina Miss India 2019	Previously Miss Navi Mumbai 2018 - 1st Runner-up

== State finalists ==
The following is the list of delegates who made to the top 3 state finalists. There were no top 3 finalists for North Eastern states since these states usually have direct appointment of state representatives during Guwahati audition:

Zone	State	Delegates
East	Arunachal Pradesh	Roshni Dada
East	Assam	Jyotishmita Baruah
East	Bihar	Snehapriya Roy; Shreya Shanker; Alankrita Shahi
East	Chhattisgarh	Anisha Sharma; Farhat Firoza; Shivani Jadhav
East	Jharkhand	Chitrapriya Singh; Kshipra Dubey; Tanvi Malhara
East	Manipur	Urmila Shagolsem
East	Meghalaya	Sangeeta Das
East	Mizoram	Nunui Rualhleng
East	Nagaland	Marino Kiho
East	Odisha	Arupa Rath; Sheetal Sahu; Tamanna Vyas
East	Sikkim	Sang Doma Tamang
East	Tripura	Jayanti Reang
East	West Bengal	Neha Jha; Sushmita Roy; Madhumita Das
North	Haryana	Sonal Sharma; Nitika; Simran Gandhi
North	Himachal Pradesh	Garima Verma; Priyanka Saraswat; Shefali Dhiman
North	Jammu and Kashmir	Shina Choudhary; Megha Kaul; Rose Kundu
North	Madhya Pradesh	Anjali Pawar; Satakshi Bhanot; Garima Yadav
North	New Delhi	Pragati Wahi; Manasi Sehgal; Subhreet Randhawa
North	Punjab	Harnaaz Kaur Sandhu; Sweetaj; Vidhi Giri
North	Uttarakhand	Akansha Gupta; Siddhi Gupta; Shivangi Sharma
North	Uttar Pradesh	Anupriya Singh; Shinata Chauhan; Vaibhavi Sharma
South	Andhra Pradesh	Nikita Tanwani; Simran Pareek; Sushmitha Raj
South	Karnataka	Divita Rai; Aashna Bisht; Shalini Menon
South	Kerala	Archana Ravi; Jane Thompson; Lakshmi Menon
South	Tamil Nadu	Anjali Schmuck; Suruthi Periyasamy; Rubeiya S K
South	Telangana	Manasa Varanasi; Tejaswini Manogna; Sanjana Vij
West	Goa	Aditi Vishwasrao; Dragana Andrade; Shaasthra Shetty
West	Gujarat	Della Desai; Janki Bodiwala; Mansi Taxak
West	Maharashtra	Phalguni Khanna; Mansi Singh; Vaishnavi Andhale
West	Rajasthan	Divya Kasliwal; Suman Rao; Yogita Bihani

== Panelists ==
- Skin Care Expert: Dr Jamuna Pai
- Personality Skills Mentor: Sanjeev Datta & Viram Datta
- Gym Partner: Body Sculptor
- Official Photographer: Anand Wahane
- Hair Coach: Kromakay
- Salon Expert: Savio John Pereira
- Make-up Coach: Clint Fernandes

== Controversy ==
This edition of the pageant stirred a controversy over Twitter where the Miss India team was accused of selecting 'fair-skinned' women to run in the pageant. People also pointed towards the fact that the girls looked similar and that the diversity of the country was not visible. However, the pageant organizers rubbished all the claims. They also made a video regarding the same topic, stating that many of their past winners and contestant came from all corners of the country and had different ethnicity.

== Notes ==
- ^Note 1: The crowning of the winner from the North state, Jammu and Kashmir was during the final event of West zonal crowning which held on 14 April 2019 in Pune. This was due to the delayed audition held in the state since the state was under emergency as a result of Pulwama terrorist attack.
