= The Heist (2024 film) =

2024 Indian film directed by Aditya Awandhe

- Theatrical release poster
- Directed by: Aditya Awandhe
- Written by: Nikita Chaturvedi
- Produced by: Farheen Vencapah; Yash Modhave
- Starring: Nad Sham; Suman Rao; Siddhanth Kapoor
- Cinematography: Anirudh Nakhare
- Edited by: Amol Vijay Khanvilkar
- Music by: Yug Bhusal
- Production companies: LIV Worldwide; YFN Worldwide Movies
- Release date: 19 July 2024
- Running time: 130 minutes
- Country: India
- Language: Hindi

The Heist is a 2024 Indian Hindi-language crime thriller film directed by Aditya Awandhe. It stars Nad Sham, Suman Rao and Siddhanth Kapoor. The film was theatrically released on 19 July 2024.

== Cast ==
- Nad Sham as Neel
- Siddhanth Kapoor as Viren Shah
- Suman Rao as Agent Ananya Bakshi
- Jagat Rawat as Xavier
- Pratyaksh Rajbhatt as Ryan
- Tasneem Khan as Suzi
- Saurabh Saraswat as Rahul
- Nandini Gupta as Herself (special appearance)

== Production ==
The film was announced in December 2023. The trailer was released on 5 June 2024.

== Soundtrack ==
The Heist

Soundtrack album by Nad Sham
- Released: 9 June 2024
- Recorded: 2023–2024
- Genre: Feature film soundtrack
- Length: 10:28
- Language: Hindi
- Label: NAd - LIV Movies

Track listing
No.	Title	Singer(s)	Length
1.	"Raftaar Se Nikle"	Himanshu Kohli	3:15
2.	"Meri Heere"	Himanshu Kohli	3:34
3.	"Aaja Bairi"	Palak Muchhal	3:39
Total length:			10:28

== Reception ==
Mahpara Kabir of ABP News gave the film 3.5/5 stars. Ganesh Aaglave for Firstpost rated the film 3/5 stars. Archika Khurana from Times Of India gave the film 2.5/5 stars. A critic from Times Now rated the film 3/5 stars .
