= Femina Miss India 2024 =

Indian beauty pageant

- Date: 16 October 2024
- Presenters: Anusha Dandekar; Nehal Chudasama; Sachin Kumbhar
- Entertainment: A Band of Boys; Gayatri Bhardwaj; Raghav Juyal; Sahil Shah; Sangeeta Bijlani; Queendom
- Venue: Famous Studios, Mumbai
- Broadcaster: Doordarshan; JioCinema; Zoom TV
- Entrants: 30
- Placements: 15
- Winner: Nikita Porwal; Madhya Pradesh
- Photogenic: Rekha Pandey; Union Territory

Femina Miss India 2024 was the 60th edition of Femina Miss India pageant, marking its diamond jubilee, was held on October 16, 2024 in Mumbai, featuring 30 contestants representing all 29 states, including Delhi, along with a combined representative for the Union Territories. The full show aired on Doordarshan on November 10, 2024, and became available for streaming on the JioCinema OTT platform from the same date.

At the end of the event, Nandini Gupta of Rajasthan, the outgoing Femina Miss India 2023, crowned Nikita Porwal from Madhya Pradesh as the new Femina Miss India 2024. Nikita will now represent India at the 73rd Miss World pageant.

Rekha Pandey from the Union Territory and Aayushi Dholakia from Gujarat were awarded the titles of first and second runners-up, respectively.

== Results ==
=== Final Result ===
For regional group:	For international placement:
E East Zone	The contestant won in an international pageant.
NE North East Zone	The contestant was a runner-up in an international pageant.
N North Zone	The contestant was a semi-finalist in an international pageant.
S South Zone	Unplaced
W West Zone
UT Union Territory

Placement	Contestant	International Placement
Femina Miss India World 2024	N Madhya Pradesh – Nikita Porwal	Miss World 2026 – TBA
1st Runner-up	UT Union Territory – Rekha Pandey	
2nd Runner-Up	W Gujarat – Aayushi Dholakia	
Top 7	N Delhi – Sifti Singh Sarang; W Goa – Shruti Raul; NE Meghalaya – Angelia N Marwein §; W Maharashtra – Arshia Rashid	
Top 15	NE Arunachal Pradesh – Tadu Lunia ∆; N Haryana – Supriya Dahiya; E Jharkhand – Riya Nandini; S Karnataka – Apeksha Shetty; W Rajasthan – Vaishnavi Sharma; S Tamil Nadu – Malina; N Uttarakhand – Sakshi Joshi; N Uttar Pradesh – Divyanshi Batra	

§ – Winner of Miss Multimedia
∆ – Winner of Beauty with a Purpose Award

=== Zonal Titleholders ===
The Zonal titles were given to delegates who placed highest in the final, aside from the main crown.

Zonal Titles	Contestant
East	Jharkhand – Riya Nandini
North East	Meghalaya – Angelia N Marwein
North	Delhi – Sifti Singh Sarang
South	Tamil Nadu – Malina
West	Maharashtra – Arshia Rashid

=== Sub-title Awards ===
Award	Contestant
Beauty with a Purpose	Arunachal Pradesh – Tadu Lunia
Miss Multimedia	Meghalaya – Angelia N Marwein

==== Miss Beautiful Eyes ====
Placement	Contestant
Winner	Maharashtra – Arshia Rashid
Top 5	Delhi – Sifti Sarang; Himachal Pradesh – Aabha Katre; Tamil Nadu – Malina; Uttarakhand – Sakshi

==== Miss Beautiful Smile ====
Placement	Contestant
Winner	Union Territory – Rekha Pandey
Top 5	Andhra Pradesh – Bhavya Reddy; Bihar – Aditi Jha; Gujarat – Aayushi Dholakia; Tamil Nadu – Malina

==== Miss Body Beautiful ====
Placement	Contestant
Winner	Maharashtra – Arshia Rashid
Top 5	Goa – Shruti Raul; Haryana – Supriya Dahiya; Meghalaya – Angelia Marwein; Odisha – Ananya Panda

==== Miss Fit and Fabulous ====
Placement	Contestant
Winner	Jharkhand – Riya Nandini
Top 6	Haryana – Supriya Dahiya; Manipur – Chanchui Khayi; Odisha – Ananya Panda; Tripura – Nikita Ghosh; West Bengal – Dolly Singh

==== Miss Goodness Ambassador ====
Placement	Contestant
Winner	Mizoram – Lalsangkimi
Top 5	Chhattisgarh – Vishakha Rai; Gujarat – Aayushi Dholakia; Karnataka – Apeksha Shetty; Kerala – Akshatha Das Meetinay

==== Miss IQ ====
Placement	Contestant
Winner	Tripura – Nikita Ghosh
Top 5	Chhattisgarh – Vishakha Rai; Gujrat – Aayushi Dholakia; Karnataka – Apeksha Shetty; Odisha – Ananya Panda

==== Miss Lifestyle ====
Placement	Contestant
Winner	Delhi – Sifti Sarang
Top 5	Bihar – Aditi Jha; Karnataka – Apeksha Shetty; Tripura – Nikita Ghosh; Uttarakhand – Sakshi Joshi

==== Miss Photogenic ====
Placement	Contestant
Winner	Union Territory – Rekha Pandey
Top 5	Himachal Pradesh – Aabha Katre; Madhya Pradesh – Nikita Porwal; Maharashtra – Arshia Rashid; Meghalaya – Angelia Marwein

==== Miss Radiant Personality ====
Placement	Contestant
Winner	Chhattisgarh – Vishakha Rai
Top 5	Himachal Pradesh – Aabha Katre; Kerala – Akshatha Das Meetinay; Maharashtra – Arshia Rashid; Punjab – Amrita Sethi

==== Miss Rampwalk ====
Placement	Contestant
Winner	Rajasthan – Vaishnavi Sharma
Top 5	Goa – Shruti Raul; Himachal Pradesh – Aabha Katre; Maharashtra – Arshia Rashid; Meghalaya – Angelia Marwein

==== Miss Shining Star ====
Placement	Contestant
Winner	Andhra Pradesh – Bhavya Reddy
Top 5	Bihar – Aditi Jha; Sikkim – Sahara Subba; Tamil Nadu – Malina; Uttar Pradesh – Divyanshi Batra

==== Miss Sudoku ====
Placement	Contestant
Winner	Telangana – Prakruthi Kambam
Top 5	Assam – Arundhuti Saikia; Chhattisgarh – Vishakha Rai; Meghalaya – Angelia Marwein; Tripura – Nikita Ghosh

==== Miss Talented ====
Placement	Contestant
Winners	Arunachal Pradesh – Tadu Lunia; Jharkhand – Riya Nandini
Top 5	Andhra Pradesh – Bhavya Reddy; Delhi – Sifti Sarang; Manipur – Chanchui Khayi

== Format ==
Following the format established in 2017, applications are invited on a state-by-state basis. These states are further categorized into five zones: East, North East, North, South, and West. After auditions are completed in each zone, finalists from each state will be announced. Subsequently, a state finalist will be declared at a zonal crowning ceremony. Finally, all 30 finalists will compete for the Miss World India title at the grand finale to be held in October 2024.

=== Selection of participants ===
On July 27, 2024, the first zonal audition commenced with the North zone, held at Bennett University in Greater Noida, Uttar Pradesh. Fashion designers Mandira Wirk and Samant Chauhan, Happiness Coach Blossom Kochhar, Brand and Operations Head of the Miss India Organization Natasha Grover, and Mr India 2014 1st runner-up Puneet Beniwal were the members of the selection committee for the North zone audition. Femina Miss India Uttar Pradesh 2023, Tanya Sharma, hosted the audition day.

Femina Miss India officially announced on July 17th via its social media handle that the winner of Femina Miss India Uttar Pradesh 2024 would be revealed at the end of the North Zonal auditions. It was telecasted live on the official social media handle of Femina Miss India and Zoom TV

All zonal auditions concluded by August 11, 2024, featuring various members as jury members. The Top 5 state finalists were announced on Femina Miss India's social media platforms on August 12, 2024. These state finalists will then compete in multiple rounds of final interviews in Mumbai on August 13 and 14, 2024.

The state finalists, determined from the final auditions, are announced on August 17th for the North East and North states, and on August 18th for the East, South, West, and Union Territories via Femina Miss India's official social media handles.

=== Event schedule ===
The following is the list of the schedules of all the events of Femina Miss India 2024:

Event	Date	Location	Jury	Presenter
North Zone Auditions	27 July 2024	Greater Noida	Blossom Kochhar – Happiness Coach; Mandira Wirk – Fashion Designer; Natasha Grover – Brand & Operations Head of the Miss India Organization; Puneet Beniwal – Mr India 2014 1st Runner-up; Samant Chauhan – Fashion Designer	Tanya Sharma – FMI Uttar Pradesh 2023
North-East Zone Auditions	02 August 2024	Guwahati	Akumnaro Imsong – Miss Nagaland 2006; Amritraj Bora – Fashion Designer; Bhaskar Saikia – Hair Stylist; Jantee Hazarika – Model; Nandini Baruah – Fashion Designer; Payal Chadha – Fashion Designer; Strela Luwang – Femina Miss India 2023 2nd Runner-up	Anushka Lekharu – FMI Assam 2023
South Zone Auditions	04 August 2024	Bengaluru	Natasha Grover – Brand & Operations Head of the Miss India Organization; Parvati Nair – Actor; Prasad Bidapa – Fashion Director; Rahul Rajasekharan – Mister Supranational Asia 2021; Shreya Rao K – Femina Miss India 2018 2nd Runner-up; Waseem Khan – Fashion Photographer	Gomathy Reddy – FMI Andhra Pradesh 2023
East Zone Auditions	08 August 2024	Kolkata	Kaustav Saikia – Fashion Photographer; Kommal Sood – Fashion Designer; Ushasi Ray – Actor	Shaswati Bala – FMI West Bengal 2023
West Zone Auditions	10 August 2024	Mumbai	Blossom Kochhar – Happiness Coach; Gokul Ganesan – Mister India World 2024; Nandini Gupta – Femina Miss India World 2023; Natasha Grover – Brand & Operations Head of the Miss India Organization; Rahul Rajasekharan – Mister Supranational Asia 2021; Rishu Bartaria – Times Talent Head; Sandip Soparrkar – Actor, Dance Choreographer; Shreya Poonja – Femina Miss India 2023 1st Runner-up; Supreet Bedi – Anchor, Communication Expert	Victoria Fernandez – FMI Goa 2023
Final Auditions	13 – 14 August 2024	Mumbai	Blossom Kochhar – Happiness Coach; Monaz Ranina – Voice Crafting Coach; Nandini Gupta – Femina Miss India World 2023; Natasha Grover – Brand & Operations Head of the Miss India Organization; Rahul Rajasekharan – Mister Supranational Asia 2021; Rishu Bartaria – Times Talent Head; Sachin Kumbhar – Anchor, Actor; Shreya Poonja – Femina Miss India 2023 1st Runner-up; Supreet Bedi – Anchor, Communication Expert	Navpreet Kaur – FMI Punjab 2017
Award Night	11 October 2024	Mumbai	None	Sachin Kumbhar – Anchor, Actor
Grand Finale	16 October 2024	Mumbai	Anees Bazmee – Indian film director; Bosco Martis – Dance choreographer; Madhur Bhandarkar – Indian film director; Neha Dhupia – Actress and Femina Miss India Universe 2002; Nikita Mhaisalkar – Fashion designer; Sangeeta Bijlani – Former actress and Femina Miss India Universe 1980	Anusha Dandekar – VJ, Actress and Singer; Nehal Chudasama – Miss Diva Universe 2018; Sachin Kumbhar – Anchor, Actor

== Contestants ==
The following is the list of the official delegates of Femina Miss India 2024 representing 29 states +1 common winner from all Union territories of the country:

Color key

- : Declared as Winner
- : Ended as runner-up
- : Ended as one of the finalists/semi-finalists

Zone	State	Delegate	Age
East	Bihar	Aditi Jha	TBA
East	Chhattisgarh	Vishakha Rai	TBA
East	Jharkhand	Riya Nandini	TBA
East	Odisha	Ananya Panda	TBA
East	West Bengal	Dolly Singh	TBA
North East	Arunachal Pradesh	Tadu Lunia	TBA
North East	Assam	Arundhuti Saikia	TBA
North East	Manipur	Chanchui Khayi	24
North East	Meghalaya	Angelia N Marwein	TBA
North East	Mizoram	Lalsangkimi	TBA
North East	Nagaland	Jentiren Jamir	TBA
North East	Sikkim	Sahara Subba	18
North East	Tripura	Nikita Ghosh	TBA
North	Delhi	Sifti Singh Sarang	19
North	Haryana	Supriya Dahiya	22
North	Himachal Pradesh	Aabha Katre	TBA
North	Madhya Pradesh	Nikita Porwal	22
North	Punjab	Amrita Sethi	TBA
North	Uttarakhand	Sakshi Joshi	TBA
North	Uttar Pradesh	Divyanshi Batra	21
South	Andhra Pradesh	Bhavya Reddy	TBA
South	Karnataka	Apeksha Shetty	26
South	Kerala	Akshatha Das Meetinay	23
South	Tamil Nadu	Malina	TBA
South	Telangana	Prakruthi Kambam	28
West & Union Territory	Goa	Shruti Raul	TBA
West & Union Territory	Gujarat	Aayushi Dholakia	21
West & Union Territory	Maharashtra	Arshia Rashid	TBA
West & Union Territory	Rajasthan	Vaishnavi Sharma	TBA
West & Union Territory	Union Territory	Rekha Pandey	TBA
