= Shreya Shanker =

Indian actress and model (born 1997)

- Born: 25 March 1999 (age 27); Patna, Bihar, India
- Education: B.Com(Hons)
- Alma mater: Loreto Convent, New Delhi Delhi Public School, Vasant Kunj, New Delhi Narsee Monjee Institute of Management Studies, Mumbai
- Occupations: Model, Beauty pageant titleholder
- Height: 1.73 m (5 ft 8 in)
- Beauty pageant titleholder
- Title: Femina Miss India Bihar 2019; Femina Miss India United Continents 2019
- Hair color: Brown
- Eye color: Brown
- Major competitions: Femina Miss India Bihar 2019 (winner); Femina Miss India United Continents 2019 (winner); Miss United Continents 2019 (unplaced)

Shreya Shanker is an Indian (born 25 March 1999) actress, model and beauty pageant titleholder who was crowned Femina Miss India United Continents 2019 at the grand finale of Femina Miss India 2019 by the outgoing titleholder Gayatri Bharadwaj. She recently made her acting debut as Ariana in the web series Dil Dosti Dilemma on Amazon Prime which was released on 25 April 24. Her father is a serving Brigadier in the Indian Army and her mother is a freelance counsellor. She is the granddaughter of Dr R. S. P. Verma, an eminent dermatologist of Bihar, and her maternal grandfather, Professor Rana Pratap Sinha, is an eminent psychologist of Bihar. She has a younger sister, Alina, who is a studying at Delhi University. She represented India at Miss United Continents 2019 pageant, held on 28 September 2019.

== Pageant history ==
=== Femina Miss India 2019 ===
Shreya was crowned as Femina Miss India United Continents 2019 by the outgoing titleholder Gayatri Bharadwaj on 15 June 2019 at Sardar Vallabhbhai Patel Indoor Stadium, Mumbai. Previously, she was crowned as Femina Miss India Bihar 2019 on 23 April 2019.

=== Miss United Continents 2019 ===
Shreya represented India at Miss United Continents 2019 pageant held on 28 September 2019 in Ecuador.

== Media ==
Shreya Shanker was ranked in The Times Most Desirable Women at No. 25 in 2019.

Awards and achievements
Preceded by Gayatri Bharadwaj	Femina Miss India United Continents; 2019	Incumbent
