= Shivani Jadhav =

Indian model

- Born: 30 October 1999 (age 26); Raipur, India
- Education: MIT College of Engineering, Pune
- Occupations: Model, Beauty pageant titleholderm, actress
- Beauty pageant titleholder
- Title: Femina Miss Chhattisgarh 2019; Femina Miss Grand India 2019
- Hair color: Black
- Eye color: Black
- Major competitions: Miss Universe India 2015 (Top 16); Femina Miss India 2019 (Miss Grand India 2019); Miss Grand International 2019 (Unplaced)

Shivani Jadhav (born 30 October 1999) is an Indian model, beauty pageant titleholder and actress who was crowned Femina Miss Grand India 2019 at the grand finale of Femina Miss India 2019 by the outgoing titleholder Meenakshi Chaudhary. She represented India at Miss Grand International 2019 pageant which was held in Venezuela on 25 October 2019. She became an actress in 2025.

== Pageant History ==
=== Miss Diva 2015 ===
Shivani participated in Miss Diva - Miss India Universe 2015 pageant where she got eliminated in episode five during the preliminary round.

=== Femina Miss India 2019 ===
Shivani was crowned as Femina Miss Grand India 2019 by the outgoing titleholder Meenakshi Chaudhary on 15 June 2019 at Sardar Vallabhbhai Patel Indoor Stadium, Mumbai. Previously, she was crowned as Femina Miss India Chhattisgarh 2019 on 23 April 2019. During the competition, she was crowned Miss Body beautiful award.

=== Miss Grand International 2019 ===
Shivani represented India at Miss Grand International 2019 pageant in Venezuela, where she went unplaced.

== Filmography ==
Year	Film	Role	Notes
2025	Romeo S3	Anushka	

Awards and achievements
Preceded by Meenakshi Chaudhary	Femina Miss Grand India; 2019	Manika Sheokand
