= K. D. Purso =

Indian politician

K. B. Purso was a member of the legislative assembly (1967–1971) from Karwar constituency to the Karnataka state, Bangalore in India when Veerendra Patil was the Chief Minister of Karnataka.
