= Femina Miss India 2022 =

Indian beauty pageant

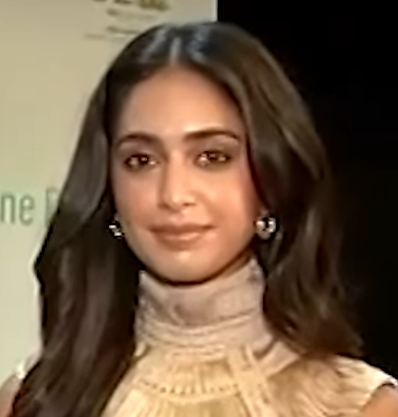
- Sini Sadanand Shetty
- Date: 03 July 2022
- Presenters: Manish Paul; Manasa Varanasi; Rajkummar Rao
- Entertainment: Kriti Sanon; Lauren Gottlieb
- Venue: Jio World Convention Centre, Mumbai, Maharashtra, India
- Broadcaster: Colors TV
- Entrants: 30
- Placements: 10
- Winner: Sini Shetty; Karnataka
- Photogenic: Rubal Shekhawat Rajasthan

Femina Miss India 2022 was the 58th edition of the Femina Miss India beauty pageant. It was held on 3 July 2022 at Mumbai, Maharashtra, with contestants from 29 states (including Delhi and Jammu & Kashmir) and a collective representative for all Union Territories adding up to 30 participants competed for the title.

At the end of the event, Manasa Varanasi of Telangana crowned Sini Shetty of Karnataka as her successor, who represented India at Miss World 2023. Manika Sheokand of Haryana, crowned Rubal Shekhawat of Rajasthan as the first runner-up and Manya Singh of Uttar Pradesh crowned Shinata Chauhan of Uttar Pradesh as the second runner-up.

== Results ==
=== Placements ===
For regional group:	For international placement:
E East Zone	The contestant won in an international pageant.
NE North East Zone	The contestant was a runner-up in an international pageant.
N North Zone	The contestant was a semi-finalist in an international pageant.
S South Zone	Unplaced
W West Zone
UT West Zone

Placement	Contestant	International Placement
Femina Miss India World 2022	S Karnataka – Sini Shetty	Top 8
1st Runner Up	W Rajasthan – Rubal Shekhawat	
2nd Runner Up	N Uttar Pradesh – Shinata Chauhan	
Top 5	NE Meghalaya – Gargee Nandy; S Telangana – Pragnya Ayyagari	
Top 10	S Andhra Pradesh – Sailikhita Yalamanchili; E Chhattisgarh – Sifat Sehgal; N Haryana – Savvy Rai; N Himachal Pradesh – Amisha Thakur; W Maharashtra – Disha Patil	

== Sub Title Awards ==
Femina Miss India 2022 sub-contest winners were announced in Mumbai on June 16, 2022.

Award	Contestant
Goodness Ambassador	Himachal Pradesh - Amisha Thakur
Miss Glamorous Look	Rajasthan - Rubal Shekhawat
Miss Rampwalk	Kerala - Soumya Shasi Kumar
Miss Radiant Smile	Arunachal Pradesh - Tengam Celine Koyu
Miss Lifestyle	Haryana - Savvy Rai
Rising Star	Andhra Pradesh - Sailikhita Yalamanchili
Miss Sudoku	Uttarakhand - Aishwarya Bisht
Miss Talented	Arunachal Pradesh - Tengam Celine Koyu Karnataka - Sini Shetty
Miss Photogenic	Rajasthan - Rubal Shekhawat
Miss Intelligence Quotient	Tripura - Hritwika Majumder
Miss Body Beautiful	Karnataka - Sini Shetty
Miss Beautiful Skin	Mizoram - Lalramhlui Sailo
Miss Active	Goa - Amanda Vas

== Format ==
The registration form was published on the organization's official website on 14 February 2022 and remained open until 15 March 2022. The format was updated to include more reduced height criteria (5 ft 3 in). Shortlisted were 31 finalists, 28 of whom were state representatives, one each from Delhi and Jammu & Kashmir, and a collective representative from the remaining union territories. Later Shivani Rajashekar from Tamilnadu withdrew leaving the number to 30. The contest's progress was scheduled to be completed in four stages, with the grand finale taking place in July 2022.

=== The Phases ===
The selection and first phase (February & March) was to shortlist the applicants in which they were judged on four key parameters: appearance, personality, talent, interview, and walk down the ramp. A panel judged each candidate, and the entries were narrowed down to groups of finalists for each state.

A series of interviews were conducted in the second phase of the contest (April) to select 31 state winners who would form the final pool of contestants for Femina Miss India 2022.

The third phase of the contest, involved training of the 31 state finalists in a holistic curriculum consisting of classes and interactive sessions facilitated by industry experts on topics ranging from skincare to self-expression, from style from the changing room to the ramp. State winners also received training in content creation and social media management, in addition to presentation and grooming. This training would allow the finalists to document their experiences during both preparation and competition.

The pageant's final phase (2022), the Grand Finale, was produced and broadcast as a prerecorded television show featuring artist performances, sponsor integrations, and contestant rounds, culminating in the announcement of the Top 5 followed by the Top 3 winners.

=== Mentor ===
The contest was mentored by Bollywood film actress and Femina Miss India 2002, Neha Dhupia. She coached the contestants through the rounds of the competition as a mentor, assisting them with overall development on their journey to becoming a beauty queen. 31 finalists were announced from each zone, namely North, North East, South, East, West, and Union territory with Delhi.

=== Judges ===
- Neha Dhupia - Femina Miss India 2002
- Malaika Arora - Actress
- Rohit Gandhi - Fashion Designer
- Rahul Khanna - Fashion Designer
- Dino Morea - Actor & Model
- Shiamak Davar - Choreographer
- Mithali Raj - Cricketer

== Contestants ==
The following is the list of the official delegates of Miss India 2022 representing 30 states (including Delhi and Jammu & Kashmir) +1 common winners from all Union territories of the country:

Color key

- Declared as Winner
- Ended as Runner-up
- Ended as one of the Finalists or Semi-finalists

Zone	State	Delegate	Age
East	Bihar	Kajal Rani	20
East	Chhattisgarh	Sifat Sehgal	22
East	Jharkhand	Riya Tirkey	24
East	Odisha	Tanishq Singh	19
East	West Bengal	Megna Mukherjee	22
North East	Arunachal Pradesh	Tengam Celine Koyu	
North East	Assam	Diya Palit	20
North East	Manipur	Angobi Chanu Loukrakpam	23
North East	Meghalaya	Gargee Nandy	25
North East	Mizoram	Lalramhlui Sailo	21
North East	Nagaland	Lovi Awomi	19
North East	Sikkim	Pranita Chettri	21
North East	Tripura	Hritwika Majumder	22
North	Haryana	Savvy Rai	
North	Himachal Pradesh	Amisha Thakur	23
North	Jammu and Kashmir	Angelia Baghi	22
North	Madhya Pradesh	Aaradhya Rao	22
North	New Delhi	Prakshi Goel	20
North	Punjab	Lekh Uthaihah	23
North	Uttarakhand	Aishwarya Bisht	
North	Uttar Pradesh	Shinata Chauhan	21
South	Andhra Pradesh	Sailikhita Yalamanchili	
South	Karnataka	Sini Shetty	21
South	Kerala	Soumya Shasi Kumar	25
South	Tamil Nadu	Shivani Rajashekar - (withdrawn)	24
South	Telangana	Pragnya Ayyagari	20
West & Union Territory	Goa	Amanda Vas	21
West & Union Territory	Gujarat	Arshya Chandrashekhar	21
West & Union Territory	Maharashtra	Disha Patil	23
West & Union Territory	Rajasthan	Rubal Shekhawat	19
West & Union Territory	Union Territory	Seerat Sidhu	

== Notes ==
Pragnya Ayyagari was crowned Miss Diva Supranational 2022 on October 30, 2022, in Miss Diva 2022 which was the 10th anniversary edition of the Miss Diva beauty pageant. She competed in the Miss Supranational 2023 pageant representing India. She placed in the top 12 and was crowned as Miss Supranational Asia 2023.

=== Replacements ===
Shivani Rajashekar from Tamilnadu withdrew from the contest due to her medical exams coinciding with the pageant date. No replacement was appointed in her place.
