= Suman Rao =

Indian beauty pageant titleholder

- Born: Suman Ratan Singh Rao; 23 November 1998 (age 27); Rajsamand, Rajasthan, India
- Education: University of Mumbai
- Beauty pageant titleholder
- Title: Femina Miss Rajasthan 2019; Femina Miss India 2019; Miss World Asia 2019
- Major competitions: Femina Miss Rajasthan 2019; (Winner); Femina Miss India 2019; (Winner); Miss World 2019; (2nd Runner-Up); (Miss World Asia)

Suman Ratan Singh Rao (born 23 November 1998) is an Indian beauty pageant titleholder who won Femina Miss India 2019. She represented India at Miss World 2019 at ExCeL London, UK, and was the second runner-up and as Miss World Asia.

== Early life and education ==
Suman Rao was born on 23 November 1998 in Aaidana village, Rajsamand District, Rajasthan. Her father, Rao Ratan Singh Aidana, is a jeweller, while mother Sushila Kunwar is a homemaker. She has two brothers. Her family moved to Mumbai when she was a year old. She attended Mahatma School of Academics and Sports in Navi Mumbai and is pursuing Chartered Accountancy course from the Institute of Chartered Accountants of India. She is fluent in English and Hindi, in addition to her mother tongue Mewari. She is also a trained Bharatnatyam dancer.

== Pageantry ==
In 2018, she took part in Miss Navi Mumbai contest, and was first runner-up. She then auditioned for the title of Femina Miss Rajasthan 2019 which she won. She represented the state of Rajasthan at Femina Miss India 2019. On 15 June 2019, she was crowned as Femina Miss India World by the outgoing titleholder Anukreethy Vas at Sardar Vallabhbhai Patel Indoor Stadium, Mumbai. During the pageant's sub contest ceremony, she won the 'Miss Rampwalk' award.

=== Miss World 2019 ===
Rao represented India at the Miss World 2019, where she was third in the 'Top Model' round and top 27 in 'Talent' segment. She won the first stage of Head-to-Head Challenge in Group 14, qualifying for the succeeding round of the challenge, which was judged by Piers Morgan. She competed against Bangladesh in the round, where she won and secured a spot in the Top 40 of Miss World 2019.

Rao's Beauty with a Purpose project was also selected in the top 10. Her campaign was titled ‘Project Pragati’, for which she made initiatives that helped women in tribal communities by assisting them to acquire financial independence. She procured machines that aided production of aloe vera and rose extracts, gels and shampoo. The women could then manufacture the products and earn their livelihood from within their village. Her project received support from the Princess Diya Kumari Foundation and women were trained to make handlooms, decorative handicrafts, accessories and jewellery. These products are sold near the Jaipur City Palace and also through an online website. She is also associated with the Bharat Sevashram Sangha, a non-profit organisation backed by the United Nations, for a wider reach of their products.

The pageant's finale was held in ExCeL London, United Kingdom, on 14 December 2019, where Rao was the second runner-up to the winner, Toni-Ann Singh from Jamaica. She is the first Indian to be crowned the 2nd runner-up at the Miss World pageant.

== Media ==
Rao was ranked in The Times Most Desirable Women at number two in 2019.

== Filmography ==
Year	Title	Role	Ref.
2024	The Heist	Agent Ananya Bakshi	

== Music videos ==
Year	Title	Singer(s)	Ref.
2021	Mere Dil Vich	Arjun Kanungo, Tanzeel Khan	
2022	Ishq Paudiyan	Mohammed Irfan	

Awards and achievements
Preceded by (Thailand) Nicolene Bunchu	Miss World Asia; 2019	Succeeded by (Indonesia) Pricilia Carla Yules
Preceded by (Belarus) Maria Vasilevich (Jamaica) Kadijah Robinson (Uganda) Quiin Abenakyo (Top 5)	Miss World 2nd Runner-Up; 2019	Succeeded by (Ivory Coast) Olivia Yacé
Preceded by Anukreethy Vas	Femina Miss India; 2019	Succeeded by Manasa Varanasi
Preceded by Nikita Soni	Femina Miss Rajasthan; 2019	Succeeded by Aruna Beniwal
