= Sadhvi Sail =

Indian beauty pageant titleholder

- Education: University of British Columbia
- Father: Satish Krishna Sail
- Beauty pageant titleholder
- Title: Femina Miss India World 2026
- Major competitions: Femina Miss India 2026 (Winner); Miss World 2027; (TBD)

Sadhvi Satish Sail is an Indian beauty pageant titleholder who won Femina Miss India World 2026. As the winner, she will represent India at Miss World 2027.

== Early life and education ==
Sadhvi Satish Sail is based in Panaji, Goa, India. She is the daughter of Indian politician Satish Krishna Sail. Sail studied economics and international relations at the University of British Columbia.

== Pageantry ==
Before entering pageantry, Sail worked as a model and entrepreneur.

=== Femina Miss India 2026 ===
Sail represented Goa and won Femina Miss India World 2026 at the Kalinga Institute of Industrial Technology in Bhubaneswar on 18 April 2026. Sail became the first woman representing Goa state to win Femina Miss India World. As the winner, she will represent India at Miss World 2027 to be held in Tanzania.

Awards and achievements
Preceded by Nikita Porwal	Femina Miss India World; 2026	Incumbent
Preceded by Shruti Raul	Femina Miss India Goa; 2026	Incumbent
