= Nikita Porwal =

Indian beauty pageant titleholder

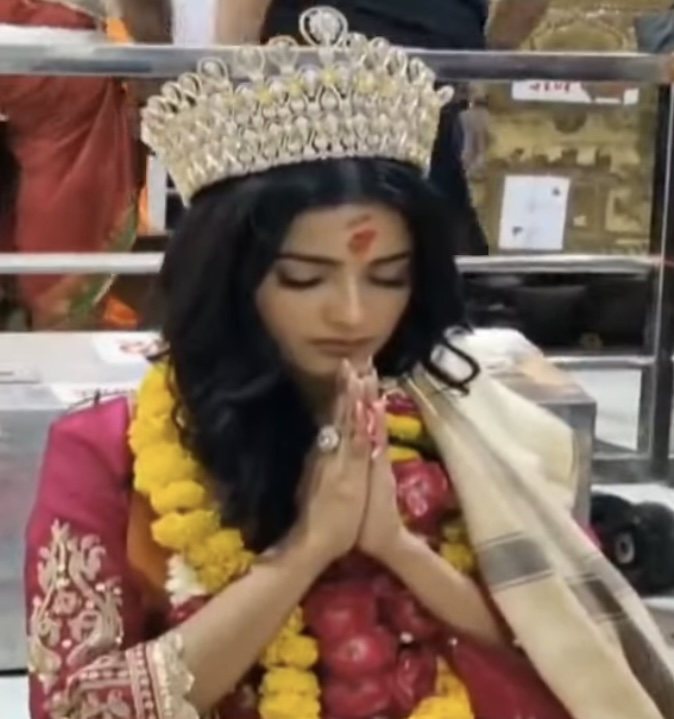
- Porwal in 2024
- Born: Ujjain, Madhya Pradesh, India
- Education: Maharaja Sayajirao University of Baroda
- Beauty pageant titleholder
- Title: Femina Miss India World 2024
- Major competitions: Femina Miss India 2024 (Winner); Miss World 2026; (Top 40)

Nikita Porwal is an Indian actress and beauty pageant titleholder who won Femina Miss India World 2024. She debuted in film industry with Brij Bhasha film Chambal Paar. She also represented India at Miss World 2026 pageant in Vietnam.

== Early life and education ==
Porwal was born and brought up in Ujjain, Madhya Pradesh. She completed her schooling at Carmel Convent Senior Secondary School in Ujjain and graduated from Maharaja Sayajirao University of Baroda. She began her career as a TV anchor at the age of 18.

== Filmography ==
Year	Film	Role	Notes
2026	Chambal Paar	Sangeeta	Brij Bhasha film

Awards and achievements
Preceded by Nandini Gupta	Femina Miss India World; 2024	Succeeded by Sadhvi Sail
Preceded by Pratika Saxena	Femina Miss India Madhya Pradesh; 2024	Succeeded by Dhanushree Chauhan
