= Anukreethy Vas =

Indian actress and model

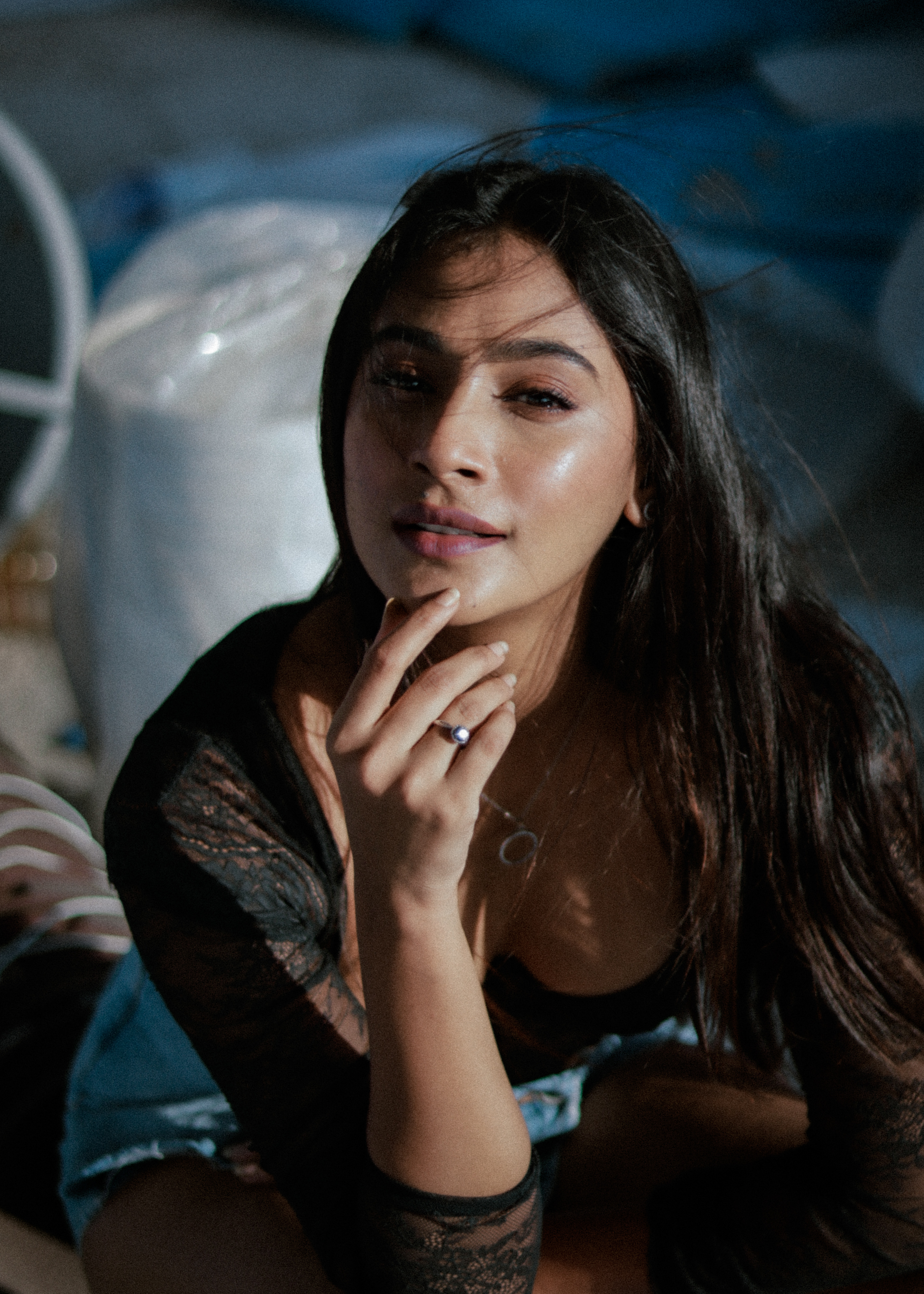
- Anukreethy Vas
- Born: 28 September 1999 (age 27); Tiruchirapalli, Tamil Nadu, India
- Education: Bachelor of Arts in French
- Alma mater: Loyola College, Chennai
- Occupations: Model, actress, beauty pageant titleholder
- Height: 1.70 m (5 ft 7 in)
- Beauty pageant titleholder
- Title: Femina Miss Tamil Nadu 2018; Femina Miss India 2018
- Hair color: Black
- Eye color: Black
- Major competitions: Femina Miss Tamil Nadu 2018 (Winner); Femina Miss India 2018 (Winner) (Miss Beautiful Smile) (Miss beauty with a purpose); Miss World 2018 (Top 30) (Head to Head challenge - Winner) (Miss World Talent - Top 18) (Multimedia award - Top 5)

Anukreethy Vas (born September 28, 1999) is an Indian actress, model and beauty pageant titleholder who was crowned Femina Miss India 2018. She represented India at the 68th edition of Miss World pageant held in Sanya, China on 8 December 2018 where she ended up placing in the Top 30 semi finalists.

== Personal life ==
Anukreethy was born and brought up in Tiruchirappalli, Tamil Nadu, India. She was abandoned by her father at age seven and was raised by her mother Seleena Mohan who hails from Kerala. Her mother tongue is Malayalam, and her native place is Kerala.

She attended the Montfort School, Tiruchirappalli. She completed her senior secondary education from R. S. Krishnan Higher Secondary School. She is currently pursuing her BA degree in French Literature at Loyola College, Chennai. She has a younger brother who is currently studying in college.

She is a sports person, and a motorbike enthusiast.

== Pageant history ==
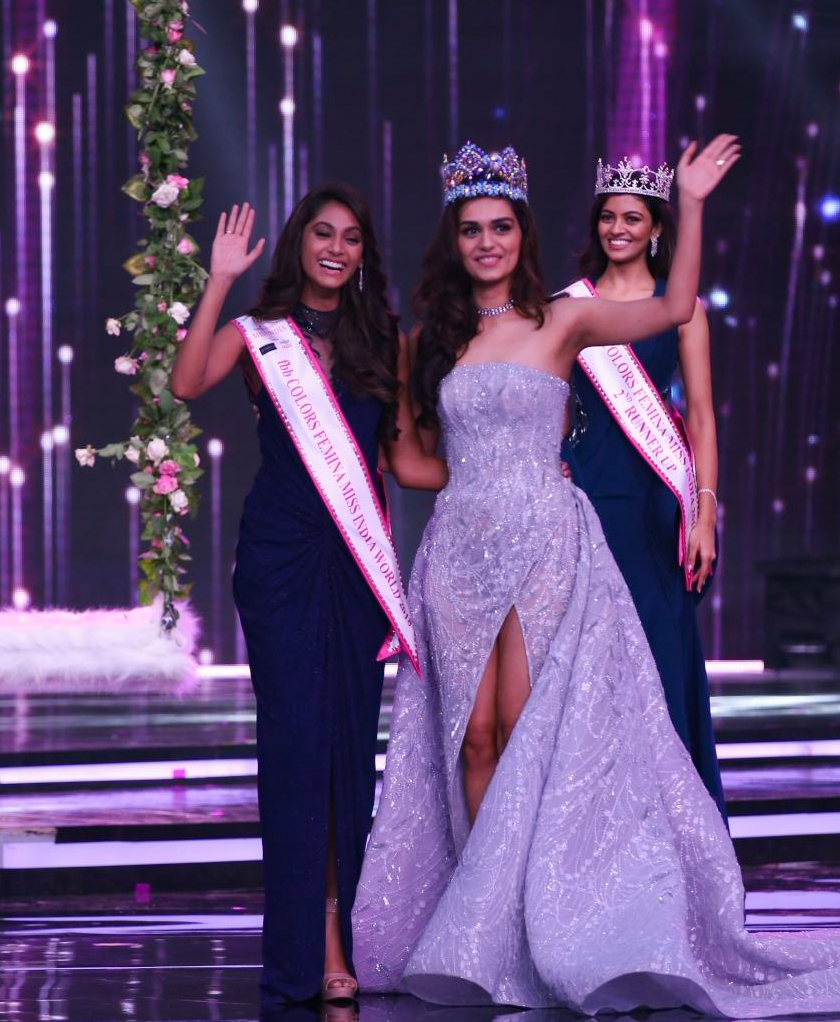
Vas (left) with her Miss India predecessor Manushi Chhillar (right) at the grand finale of Femina Miss India 2018, in NSCI Dome, Mumbai

Anukreethy Vas was crowned Femina Miss India 2018 by the outgoing titleholder and Miss World 2017 Manushi Chhillar. Previously, she was crowned as Femina Miss India Tamil Nadu 2018 in February 2018. During the competition, she was crowned Miss Beautiful Smile and won the Beauty with a Purpose award. Anukreethy represented India at the Miss World 2018 pageant held in Sanya, China on 8 December 2018, where she made it to the top 18 of the Talent round. She also entered the top 30 of the competition by winning the head-to-head challenge of her round.

== Filmography ==
Key
†	Denotes films that have not yet been released

Year	Title	Role	Language	Notes	Ref.
2022	DSP	Annapoorani	Tamil	Tamil debut	
2023	Tiger Nageswara Rao	Jayavani	Telugu	Telugu debut	
2024	Visfot	Song performer	Hindi	Hindi debut	
TBA	Vettri†	TBA	Tamil		

Awards and achievements
Preceded by Manushi Chhillar; Haryana	Femina Miss India; 2018	Suman Rao; Rajasthan
