= Femina Miss India South =

Indian beauty pageant

- Formation: 2008
- Type: Beauty Pageant
- Location: India
- Members: Femina Miss India
- Official language: English

Femina Miss India South is a regional beauty pageant established in 2008 by the Times Group. Initially, it selected one representative from each of the five southern states: Andhra Pradesh, Karnataka, Kerala, Tamil Nadu, and Telangana to compete in the national Femina Miss India pageant. Starting in 2017, the format changed, with individual winners chosen from each state to represent their respective regions at the national level.

== Format ==
Auditions are held in a selected city within the five states. Contestants from all across these five states will participate in a multi-stage audition process. The shortlisted candidates will be announced on the Femina Miss India social media handle. Subsequently, the five state winners will be crowned at a zonal crowning ceremony. These five winners will then represent their states at the national pageant, Femina Miss India.

=== Titles ===
Since the introduction of the regional format at Femina Miss India, South India has been the most successful region, claiming three victories out of six editions.

Number of wins of South Indians at Femina Miss India
State	Wins
Karnataka	1
Tamil Nadu	1
Telangana	1
Andhra Pradesh	0
Kerala	0

== Representatives at Femina Miss India ==
The following provides an overview of the winners from each of the five South Indian states and a detailed breakdown of their performance and placement at the national Femina Miss India pageant.

Color key

- : Declared as winner
- : Ended as runner-up or top 5/6 qualification
- : Ended as one of the finalists/semi-finalists
- : Unplaced but given special award(s)

States Year	Andhra Pradesh	Karnataka	Kerala	Tamil Nadu	Telangana
2026	Chikalapudi Indu Phalguni; Top 15	Khushi Ramesh Kalakeri; Top 15	Medhavi Saboo	Tejashvee Arunprassad	Ramya Kailasa; Top 15
2024	Bhavya Reddy	Apeksha Shetty; Top 15	Akshatha Das	Malina; Top 15	Prakruthi Kambam
2023	Gomathy Reddy	Megan Edward; Top 7	Christeena Biju; Top 7	Karunya Mohanasundaram	Urmila Chauhan
2022	Sailikhita Yalamanchili; Top 10	Sini Shetty; Femina Miss India World	Soumya Shasi Kumar	Shivani Rajashekar	Pragnya Ayyagari; Top 5
2020	Tejal Patil	Rati Hulji; Top 5	Leena Lal; Top 15	Raina Garg; Top 20	Manasa Varanasi; Femina Miss India World
2019	Nikita Tanwani	Aashna Bisht	Lakshmi Menon	Rubeiya S K	Sanjana Vij; 1st Runner-Up
2018	Shreya Rao Kamaravapu; 2nd Runner-Up	Bhavana Durgam Reddy; Top 12	Mekhana Shajan	Anukreethy Vas; Femina Miss India World	Kamakshi Bhaskarla
2017	Srishti Vyakaranam	Swathi Muppala; Top 15	Mannat Singh; Top 15	Sherlin Seth	Simran Choudhary

=== Andhra Pradesh ===
Year	Delegate	Age	Placement & Performance	
Year	Delegate	Age	Placements	Special award(s)
2017	Srishti Vyakaranam	24	Unplaced	
2018	Shreya Rao Kamaravapu	25	2nd Runner-up	5 Special Awards: Miss Multimedia; Rajnigandha Pearls Miss Goodness Ambassador; Top 10 – Senco Gold Miss Shining Star; Top 10 – Naturals Salon Miss Refreshing Beauty; Top 12 – fbb Miss Fashion Icon
2019	Nikita Tanwani	24	Unplaced	1 Special Award: Miss Top Spin (Table Tennis) – Bennett University Sports day
2020	Tejal Patil	21	Unplaced	
2022	Sailikhita Yalamanchili	24	Top 10	1 Special Award: Rising Star
2023	Gomathy Reddy	21	Unplaced	
2024	Bhavya Reddy		Unplaced	3 Special Awards: Miss Shining Star; Top 5 – Miss Beautiful Smile; Top 5 – Miss Talented
2026	Chilakalapudi Indu Phalguni		Top 15	4 Special Awards: Femina Miss India 2026 South (Zonal Titleholder); Top 5 – Miss Goodness Ambassador; Top 5 – Miss Photogenic; Top 5 – Miss Rampwalk

=== Karnataka ===
Year	Delegate	Age	Placement & Performance	
Year	Delegate	Age	Placements	Special award(s)
2017	Swathi Muppala (Note: KARNATAKA — Swathi Muppala replaced Ruhika Das, Femina Miss India Karnataka 2017, who withdrew due to health reasons. Appointed by the Femina Miss India organization, Muppala competed in the Femina Miss India 2017 pageant. Notably, she was among the Top 3 finalists at the Femina Miss India Karnataka 2017 auditions.)	25	Top 15	2 Special Awards: Top 5 – Miss Active; Top 9 – Body Beautiful
2018	Bhavana Durgam Reddy	21	Top 12	
2019	Aashna Bisht	24	Unplaced	1 Special Award: Rajnigandha Pearls Miss Beautiful Smile
2020	Rati Hulji	25	Top 5	
2022	Sini Shetty	21	Femina Miss India World 2022	2 Special Awards: Miss Body Beautiful; Miss Talented
2023	Megan Edward	24	Top 7	1 Special Award: Miss Photogenic
2024	Apeksha Shetty	26	Top 15	3 Special Awards: Top 5 – Miss Goodness Ambassador; Top 5 – Miss IQ; Top 5 – Miss Lifestyle
2026	Khushi Ramesh Kalakeri		Top 15	

=== Kerala ===
Year	Delegate	Age	Placement & Performance	
Year	Delegate	Age	Placements	Special award(s)
2017	Mannat Singh	19	Top 15	
2018	Mekhana Shajan	19	Unplaced	1 Special Award: Winner – Miss Talented
2019	Lakshmi Menon (Note: KERALA — Lakshmi Menon replaced Jane Thompson as Femina Miss India Kerala 2019 due to personal reasons. She was subsequently selected by the Femina Miss India organization to compete in the Femina Miss India 2019 pageant. Notably, Lakshmi Menon was among the Top 3 finalists at the Femina Miss India Kerala 2019 auditions.)	24	Unplaced	1 Special Award: Winner – Beauty with a Purpose
2020	Leena Lal	25	Top 15	
2022	Soumya Shasi Kumar	25	Unplaced	1 Special Award: Winner – Miss Rampwalk
2023	Christeena Biju	25	Top 7	1 Special Award: Winner – Miss Rampwalk
2024	Akshatha Das	23	Unplaced	2 Special Awards: Top 5 – Miss Goodness Ambassador; Top 5 – Miss Radiant Personality
2026	Medhavi Saboo		Unplaced	3 Special Awards: Winner – Miss IQ; Top 5 – Miss Goodness Ambassador; Top 5 – Miss Rampwalk

=== Tamil Nadu ===
Year	Delegate	Age	Placement & Performance	
Year	Delegate	Age	Placements	Special award(s)
2017	Sherlin Seth	19	Unplaced	1 Special Award: Top 9 – Body Beautiful
2018	Anukreethy Vas	19	Femina Miss India World 2018	4 Special Awards: Beauty with a Purpose; Rajnigandha Pearls Miss Beautiful Smile; Top 6 – Chisel Miss Active; Top 10 – Senco Gold Miss Shining Star
2019	Rubeiya S K	23	Unplaced	
2020	Raina Garg	23	Top 15 (Note: TAMIL NADU — Raina, who had been announced as a Top 15 semi-finalist and was scheduled to compete in the grand finale of Femina Miss India 2020, unexpectedly withdrew from the competition for unknown reasons. This was the year when the national semi-finalists were determined online, and due to COVID-19 restrictions, only they were invited to participate in the grand finale physically.)	1 Special Award: Miss Lifestyle
2022	Shivani Rajashekar	24	Did not participate (Note: TAMIL NADU — Shivani Rajashekar withdrew from the competition due to her college exams.)	
2023	Karunya Mohanasundaram	24	Unplaced	
2024	Malina		Top 15	4 Special Awards: Femina Miss India 2024 South (Zonal Titleholder); Top 5 – Miss Beautiful Eyes; Top 5 – Miss Beautiful Smile; Top 5 – Miss Shining Star
2026	Tejashvee Arunprassad		Unplaced	1 Special Awards: Top 5 – Miss Sudoku

=== Telangana ===
Year	Delegate	Age	Placement & Performance	
Year	Delegate	Age	Placements	Special award(s)
2017	Simran Choudhary	24	Unplaced	2 Special Awards: Winner – Miss Talented; Top 5 – Miss Active
2018	Sai Kamakshi Bhaskarla	23	Unplaced	1 Special Award: Top 10 – Senco Gold Miss Shining Star
2019	Sanjana Vij	23	1st Runner-up	3 Special Award: Winner – Miss Spectacular Eyes; Winner – Miss Smasher (Badminton) – Bennett University Sports day; Winner – Miss Photogenic (Zonal sub-contest)
2020	Manasa Varanasi	24	Femina Miss India World 2020	1 Special Award: Winner – Miss Rampwalk
2022	Pragnya Ayyagari	20	Top 5	
2023	Urmila Chauhan	25	Unplaced	1 Special Award: Winner – Miss Congeniality
2024	Prakruthi Kambam		Unplaced	
2026	Ramya Kailasa		Top 15	2 Special Awards: Winner – Miss Photogenic; Top 5 – Fashion Icon

=== Zonal Titleholders ===
Since 2024, the pageant has included a zonal title, awarded to one of the regional titleholders representing the South Zone. The recent results are as follows:

Year	Winner	State	Placement at FMI	Ref.
2026	Chikalapudi Indu Phalguni	Andhra Pradesh	Top 15	
2024	Malina	Tamil Nadu	Top 15	

== Representatives at International Pageants ==
The following is a list of South Indian Representatives at International Beauty Pageants (Since 2008) by Femina Miss India/Miss Diva Organization:

Year	Delegate	State	International Pageant	Placement & Performance	
Year	Delegate	State	International Pageant	Placements	Special award(s)
2008	Parvathy Omanakuttan	Kerala	Miss World 2008	1st Runner-up	3 Special Awards: Miss World Continental Queen of Asia; 2nd Runner-Up – Miss World Top Model; Top 10 – Miss World Beach Beauty
2010	Nicole Faria	Karnataka	Miss Earth 2010	Miss Earth 2010	2 Special Awards: Miss Talent; Miss Diamond Place
2013	Sobhita Dhulipala	Karnataka	Miss Earth 2013	Unplaced	5 Special Awards: Miss Photogenic; Miss Earth Eco Beauty; Miss Ever Bilena; Top 15 – Miss Talent; Top 15 – Best in Resort Wear
2018	Anukreethy Vas	Tamil Nadu	Miss World 2018	Top 30	3 Special Awards: Winner – Head-to-Head Challenge; Top 10 – Multimedia Award; Top 18 – Miss World Talent
2021	Manasa Varanasi	Telangana	Miss World 2021	Top 13	2 Special Awards: Top 6 – Beauty With A Purpose; Top 27 – Miss World Talent
2023	Sini Sadanand Shetty	Karnataka	Miss World 2023	Top 8	5 Special Awards: Miss World Asia & Oceania; Winner – World Fashion Designer Dress; Top 14 – Miss World Talent; Top 20 – Miss World Top Model; Top 25 – Head-to-Head Challenge
2023	Pragnya Ayyagari	Telangana	Miss Supranational 2023	Top 12	4 Special Awards: Miss Supranational Asia; Top 5 – Supra Chat; Top 7 – Miss Talent; Top 10 – Supra Fan-Vote

== Mentor ==
The franchise organises a mentor/coach to each zone to train the candidates for the final event.

Year	Mentor	About
2023	Neha Dhupia	Miss Universe 2002 - Top 10; Femina Miss India 2002
2022	Neha Dhupia	Miss Universe 2002 - Top 10; Femina Miss India 2002
2020	Neha Dhupia	Miss Universe 2002 - Top 10; Femina Miss India 2002
2019	Dia Mirza	Miss Asia Pacific 2000
2018	Rakul Preet Singh	Femina Miss India 2011 - 3rd Runner-up
2017	Parvathy Omanakuttan	Miss World 2008 - 1st Runner-up; Femina Miss India World 2008; Femina Miss India South 2008

== Representatives at Femina Miss India ==
Only one candidate from whole of the five states in South India was chosen to compete in the Femina Miss India pageant from 2008 to 2013.

Year	Delegate	State	Placement & Performance at Femina Miss India	
Year	Delegate	State	Placements	Special award(s)
2008	Parvathy Omanakuttan	Kerala	Femina Miss India World 2008	3 Special Awards: Miss Beautiful Hair; Miss Photogenic; Miss Personality
2009	Faith Pandey	Karnataka	Top 10	
2010	Nicole Faria	Karnataka	Femina Miss India Earth 2010	3 Special Awards: ADP Femina Miss Photogenic; Saint Femina Miss Pure; HP Femina Gadget Girl
2011	Shweta Dolli	Tamil Nadu	Top 10	
2012	Shamata Anchan	Karnataka	Top 10	1 Special Award: Miss Active
2013	Sobhita Dhulipala	Andhra Pradesh	Femina Miss India Earth 2013	3 Special Awards: Femina Miss Talented; iTimes Femina Miss Digital Diva; Miss Internet
