= Anand Asnotikar =

Indian politician

Asnotikar Anand Vasant is an Indian politician. He was elected to the Karnataka Legislative Assembly from Karwar in the 2008 Karnataka Legislative Assembly election as a member of the Indian National Congress.
