= Nandini Gupta =

Indian beauty pageant titleholder

- Born: September 2003; Kota, Rajasthan, India
- Education: St. Paul's Senior Secondary School
- Beauty pageant titleholder
- Title: Femina Miss India World 2023
- Eye color: black
- Major competitions: Miss Rajasthan 2023; (Winner); Femina Miss India 2023; (Winner); Miss World 2025; (Top 20)

Nandini Gupta is an Indian beauty pageant titleholder who was crowned Femina Miss India World 2023. Gupta represented India at Miss World 2025 and placed in the top 20.

== Early life and education ==
Gupta was born in September 2003 in Kota, Rajasthan. She completed her schooling from St. Paul's Senior Secondary School. She is pursuing a degree in business management from Lala Lajpat Rai College, Mumbai.

== Pageantry ==
Gupta has said that she had wanted to be Miss India since she was 10 years old.

At the age of 19, she represented her home state of Rajasthan and won Femina Miss India 2023, on 15 April 2023 in Imphal, Manipur. She represented India at Miss World 2025.

== Filmography ==
Year	Title	Role	Ref.
2024	The Heist	Special appearance	

Awards and achievements
Preceded by (Turkey) Nursena Say	Top Model Asia and Oceania; 2025	Succeeded by (Vietnam) Lê Nguyễn Bảo Ngọc
Preceded by Sini Shetty	Femina Miss India World; 2023	Succeeded by Nikita Porwal
Preceded by Rubal Shekhawat	Femina Miss India Rajasthan; 2023	Succeeded by Vaishnavi Sharma
