= Sini Shetty =

Indian beauty pageant titleholder

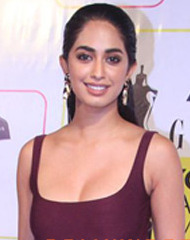
- Shetty in 2024
- Born: Sini Sadanand Shetty; Mumbai, Maharashtra, India
- Education: Somaiya Vidyavihar University
- Beauty pageant titleholder
- Title: Femina Miss India 2022
- Major competitions: Femina Miss India Karnataka 2022; (winner); Femina Miss India 2022; (winner); Miss World 2023; (Top 8)

Sini Sadanand Shetty is an Indian beauty pageant titleholder, who was crowned Femina Miss India World 2022. She represented India at Miss World 2023.

== Early life and education ==
Sini Shetty was born in Mumbai, Maharashtra into a family originally from Karnataka. She attended St. Dominic Savio Vidhyalaya in Ghatkopar, Mumbai, followed by the SK Somaiya College of Arts, Science and Commerce in Mumbai from where she graduated with a degree in accounting and finance. She is a trained Bharatanatyam dancer.

== Pageantry ==
In 2022, Shetty competed in and became Femina Miss India World, also assuming the Times Miss Body Beautiful and NIFD Miss Talent sub-title awards. The event took place on 3 July 2022 at Jio World Convention Centre, Mumbai. As Femina Miss India World 2022, Shetty next represented India at Miss World 2023, held on 9 March 2024 at Jio World Convention Centre in Mumbai, India,

Awards and achievements
Preceded by Manasa Varanasi	Femina Miss India World; 2022	Succeeded by Nandini Gupta
Preceded by Rati Hulji	Femina Miss India Karnataka; 2022	Succeeded by Megan Edward
