= Femina Miss India 2023 =

Indian beauty pageant

- Date: 15 April 2023
- Presenters: Manish Paul; Bhumi Pednekar
- Entertainment: Kartik Aaryan; Ananya Panday
- Venue: Indoor Stadium, Khuman Lampak Sports Complex, Imphal, Manipur, India
- Broadcaster: Colors TV
- Entrants: 30
- Placements: 12
- Winner: Nandini Gupta; Rajasthan
- Congeniality: Urmila Chauhan, Telangana
- Photogenic: Megan Edward, Karnataka

Femina Miss India 2023 was the 59th edition of the Femina Miss India beauty pageant. After a two-year hiatus, it was held on 15 April 2023 at Imphal, Manipur, with contestants from 29 states (including Delhi) and a collective representative for all Union Territories adding up to 30 participants competed for the title.

At the end of the event, Sini Shetty of Karnataka crowned Nandini Gupta of Rajasthan as her successor, who will represent India at Miss World 2025. Rubal Shekhawat of Rajasthan, crowned Shreya Poonja of Delhi as the first runner-up and Shinata Chauhan of Uttar Pradesh crowned Strela Thounaojam Luwang of Manipur as the second runner-up.

== Results ==
For regional group:	For international placement:
E East Zone	The contestant won in an international pageant.
NE North East Zone	The contestant was a runner-up in an international pageant.
N North Zone	The contestant was a semi-finalist in an international pageant.
S South Zone	Unplaced
W West Zone
UT Union Territory

Placement	Contestant	International Placement
Femina Miss India World 2024	W Rajasthan – Nandini Gupta	Miss World 2025 – Top 20
1st Runner-up	N Delhi – Shreya Poonja	
2nd Runner-Up	NE Manipur – Thounaojam Strela Luwang	
Top 7	E Chhattisgarh – Aditi Sharma; S Karnataka – Megan Edward; S Kerala – Christeena Biju; W Maharashtra – Apurva Chavan	
Top 12	NE Assam – Anushka Lekharu; N Himachal Pradesh – Nikeet Dhillon; NE Sikkim – Zaanvii Sharma; N Uttar Pradesh – Tanya Sharma; E West Bengal – Shaswati Bala	

== Sub Title Awards ==
Award	Contestant
Beauty with a Purpose	Union Territory - Navya Kalra
Miss Multimedia	West Bengal - Shaswati Bala
Miss Glamorous Look	Manipur - Thounaojam Strela Luwang
Miss Rampwalk	Kerala - Christeena Biju
Miss Beautiful Skin	Union Territory - Navya Kalra
Miss Style Icon	Manipur - Thounaojam Strela Luwang
Miss Fit and Fabulous	Punjab - Shyna Choudhary
Miss Sudoku	Union Territory - Navya Kalra
Miss Fashion Quotient	Union Territory - Navya Kalra
Miss Shining Star	Himachal Pradesh - Nikeet Dhillon
Miss Photogenic	Karnataka - Megan Edward
Miss Intelligent Quotient	Haryana - Meharmeet Kaur
Miss Body Beautiful	Delhi - Shreya Poonja
Miss Congeniality	Telangana - Urmila Chauhan
Miss Eco Warrior	Assam - Anushka Lekharu
Miss Goodness Ambassador	Madhya Pradesh - Pratika Saxena
Miss Talented	Arunachal Pradesh - Tana Puniya Punjab - Shyna Choudhary

== Location & Format ==
=== Venue planning and agreement ===
Manipur hosted the grand finale of Femina Miss India 2023 in April 2023; this marked the first time the pageant was held outside Mumbai since 2002. In the presence of Manipur's Chief Minister N. Biren Singh, and Times of India Managing Director Vineet Jain at the CM's Secretariat in Imphal, an agreement to formalise the cooperation was signed between the Tourism Department, Government of Manipur, and the Times Group. MP Leishemba Sanajaoba, ministers Yumnam Khemchand Singh, Govindas Konthoujam, Awangbow Newmai, Dr Sapam Ranjan Singh, H Dingko Singh, Leishangthem Susindro Meitei, MLA Losii Dikho, Chief Secretary Rajesh Kumar, and Rohit Gopakumar, Chief Operational Officer, Miss India Organisation, were also present.

=== Offline registrations ===
After two years of online pageant operations, from registration to auditions, Femina Miss India 2023 was held entirely offline. Contestants from all over the country auditioned in front of a panel of experts in a venue chosen for the zonal division. Following the audition, the organization's social media account revealed the state finalists, from which the 29 state representatives were chosen, in addition to a collective representative for the Union Territories. These 30 finalists went through rigorous training and grooming activities. Furthermore, former Miss India and Bollywood actress Neha Dhupia was a mentor to the state delegates.

=== Activities in Manipur ===
The 30 state representatives arrived at Imphal International Airport on April 7, 2023. They were received by crowning all of them with a Kajenglei (traditional Meitei female headdress) each and Leirum Lengyan (traditional Meitei shawl) each. On 9 April, they visited the historic Kangla Fort located in the heart of Imphal city, where they were photographed and had videos shot for the pageant. During the shoot, the contestants were photographed at the temples (including the Pakhangba Temple, Kangla), fort ruins and the twin Kanglasha dragon statues. They attended a self defense session organised exclusively for them at the Khuman Lampak Main Stadium.

On 10 April, the state representatives visited the Loktak lake for their filming. After that, they visited the Indian National Army Memorial Complex (INA Memorial) in Moirang. They also visited the Little Flower School, Imphal where they interacted with the students. At the end of the day, the ladies visited the Ima Keithel (Meitei for 'Ima Market'), in the heart of Imphal, which is the world's only market run exclusively by women.

=== Event schedule ===
The following is the list of the schedules of all the events of Femina Miss India 2023:

Event	Date	Location
Grand Finale	15 April 2023	Imphal
Announcement of the Top 30 State Representatives	17 February 2023	Mumbai
Final Audition	8–10 February 2023	Mumbai
West Zone Auditions	3 February 2023	Mumbai
North Zone Auditions	27 January 2023	New Delhi
South Zone Auditions	20 January 2023	Bengaluru
North-East Zone Auditions	18 January 2023	Guwahati
East Zone Auditions	13 January 2023	Kolkata

== Contestants ==
The following is the list of the official delegates of Miss India 2023 representing 29 states +1 common winner from all Union territories of the country:

Color key

- Declared as Winner
- Ended as Runner-up
- Ended as one of the Finalists or Semi-finalists

Zone	State	Delegate	Age
East	Bihar	Tanu Shree	24
East	Chhattisgarh	Aditi Sharma	25
East	Jharkhand	Kushmandvi Sharma	18
East	Odisha	Janvi Soni	22
East	West Bengal	Shaswati Bala	23
North East	Arunachal Pradesh	Tana Puniya	24
North East	Assam	Anushka Lekharu	23
North East	Manipur	Thounaojam Strela Luwang	21
North East	Meghalaya	Irene Dkhar	20
North East	Mizoram	C. Lalhmangaihzuali	22
North East	Nagaland	Ezhotou Keyho	22
North East	Sikkim	Zaanvii Sharma	20
North East	Tripura	Nabanita Bhattacharjee	21
North	Delhi	Shreya Poonja	22
North	Haryana	Meharmeet Kaur	24
North	Himachal Pradesh	Nikeet Dhillon	23
North	Madhya Pradesh	Pratika Saxena	19
North	Punjab	Shyna Choudhary	23
North	Uttarakhand	Ameesha Basera	22
North	Uttar Pradesh	Tanya Sharma	20
South	Andhra Pradesh	Gomathy Reddy	21
South	Karnataka	Megan Edward	24
South	Kerala	Christeena Biju	25
South	Tamil Nadu	Karunya Mohanasundaram	24
South	Telangana	Urmila Chauhan	25
West & Union Territory	Goa	Victoria Fernandes	23
West & Union Territory	Gujarat	Simran Saini	25
West & Union Territory	Maharashtra	Apurva Chavan	25
West & Union Territory	Rajasthan	Nandini Gupta	19
West & Union Territory	Union Territory	Navya Kalra	24

== Judges ==
- Neha Dhupia – Femina Miss India 2002, Actress, Mentor & Reality show host
- Laishram Sarita Devi – Boxer
- Terence Lewis – Choreographer
- Rocky Star – Fashion designer
- Namrata Joshipura – Fashion designer
- Harshvardhan Kulkarni - Film director & writer
