= Femina Miss India =

Indian beauty pageant

- Formation: 1952; 74 years ago
- Type: Beauty pageant
- Headquarters: Mumbai
- Location: India
- Official language: Hindi; English
- Owner: Vineet Jain
- Key people: Vineet Jain; Natasha Grover
- Parent organisation: The Times Group
- Affiliations: Women's pageants: Miss World; Men's pageants: Mister World, Mister Supranational
- Website: www.femina.in/beauty-pageants/

Miss India, also known as Femina Miss India, is a national beauty pageant in India that selects representatives to compete in the Miss World competition, one of the Big Four international beauty pageants. It is organized by Femina, a women's magazine published by The Times Group.

The reigning Femina Miss India World is Sadhvi Satish Sail from Goa. She was crowned by the previous titleholder, Nikita Porwal, on 18 April 2026 in Bhubaneswar, Odisha.

== History ==
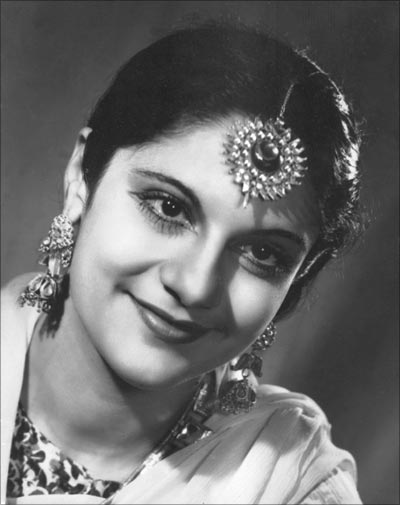
Miss India 1947 Esther Abraham

The first Miss India was Esther Abraham, from Calcutta, who won the title in 1947. The pageant was organized by the local press.

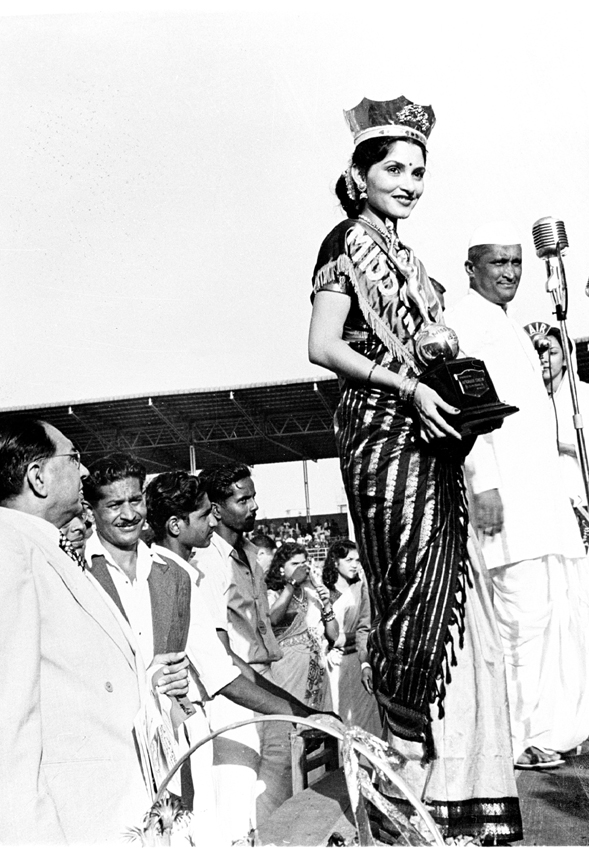
Indrani Rehman after being crowned Miss India 1952

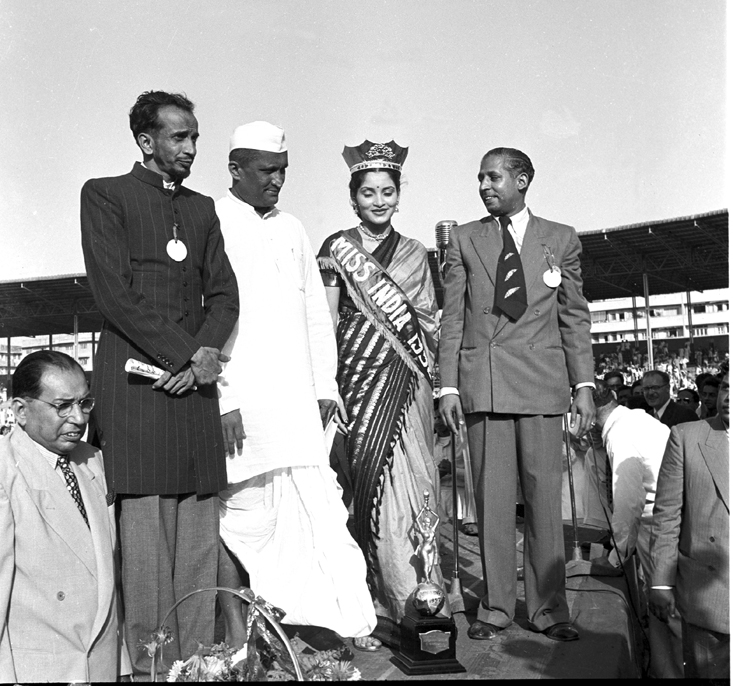
Miss India 1952, Indrani Rehman with former Indian Congress leader S.K. Patil, and two of the sponsors of the Miss India contest of 1952

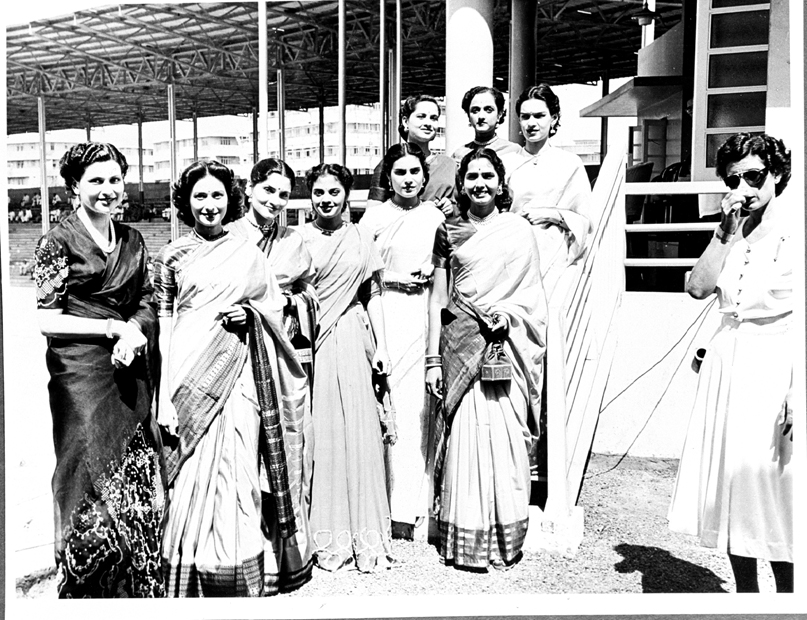
Miss India 1952 Contestants posing for the photographers at the Brabourne Stadium in Mumbai. Miss India 1952 winner, Indrani Rahman (third from left) and the Runner-up Suryakumari (sixth from left)

In 1952, two Miss India pageants were held. Indrani Rehman and Nutan were the winners. Nutan was crowned Miss Mussorie, while Rahman was crowned at Brabourne Stadium in Mumbai. Rahman later represented India at the first Miss Universe pageant in 1952.

In 1953, Peace Kanwal from Punjab was crowned Miss India at the Kardar-Kolynos pageant, organized by filmmaker Abdur Rashid Kardar. She later became a Bollywood actress.

In 1954, Leela Naidu from Maharashtra was crowned Miss India. That same year, she was featured in Vogue magazine's list of the world's ten most beautiful women.

There was no Miss India pageant between 1955 and 1958. In 1959, Eve's Weekly organized its first Miss India contest, with Fleur Ezekiel winning the title. She went on to represent India at Miss World 1959 in London.

The first Femina Miss India pageant was held in 1964. Meher Castelino Mistri of Maharashtra was crowned the winner and represented India at Miss Universe 1964 in the United States and Miss Nations 1964 in Spain.

Reita Faria became the first Miss India to win an international pageant, being crowned Miss World 1966 in London. She was the winner of the Eve's Weekly Miss India contest. That same year, Yasmin Daji, the Femina Miss India winner, represented India at Miss Universe 1966 and placed third runner-up.

Zeenat Aman was the first Femina Miss India winner to claim an international title when she won Miss Asia Pacific 1970 in the Philippines. She later became a well-known Bollywood actress

In 1981, Meenakshi Seshadri became the youngest Miss India at age 17. She too later became a Bollywood actress.

In 1994, Sushmita Sen became the first Indian to win Miss Universe, while Aishwarya Rai, the first runner-up, went on to win Miss World the same year.

In 2000, all three winners from the Femina Miss India pageant—Lara Dutta, Priyanka Chopra and Dia Mirza—won Miss Universe, Miss World, and Miss Asia Pacific International, respectively.

In 2002, the third winner of the Femina Miss India contest began representing India at Miss Earth instead of Miss Asia Pacific.

In 2008, international choreographer Sandip Soparrkar joined as the official dance and grooming expert for the contestants, alongside experts like Dr. Sandesh Mayekar for smile design, Dr. Jamuna Pai for skin and hair care, and Sabira Merchant for etiquette.

In 2010, Tantra Entertainment Pvt. Ltd. (TEPL) partnered with Sushmita Sen to launch a new pageant, I Am She – Miss Universe India, acquiring the rights to send India's representatives to Miss Universe. Winners of this pageant represented India at Miss Universe from 2010 to 2012. From 2010, Femina Miss India began crowning three winners: Femina Miss India World, Femina Miss India Earth, and Femina Miss India International, with the latter representing India at Miss International.

=== Competition irregularities ===
In 1989, Kalpana Pandit, who was initially declared the winner, was disqualified after it was found that she had misrepresented her nationality by holding a U.S. passport. Dolly Minhas was then crowned the winner.

In 2004, Lakshmi Pandit, Kalpana Pandit's sister, was named the winner but later gave up the title due to her marriage. Sayali Bhagat was subsequently awarded the title.

In 2008, a controversy occurred when Gladrags President Maureen Wadia sent a legal notice to Harshita Saxena, the newly crowned Femina Miss India Earth 2008, for violating an exclusive two-year contract she had signed in 2006. The contract required Saxena to seek written permission from Gladrags before participating in other beauty contests. As a result, Saxena surrendered her title, and Tanvi Vyas was crowned Miss India Earth. Vyas went on to represent India at Miss Earth 2008. Saxena later placed fourth in the Femina Miss India 2009 competition and represented India at Miss International 2009.

== India in international pageants ==
Current Franchises
Current franchises
Pageant	Year(s) competed
Miss World	1971, 1974, 1976–present
Miss Supranational	2013–present
Miss Cosmo	2025–
Former Franchises
Pageant	Year(s) competed
Miss Universe	1964–1987, 1989–2009, 2013–2023
Miss Grand International	2015–2019, 2021
Miss International	1991–2014
Miss Earth	2001–2014
Miss Universal Peace and Humanity	2014
Miss United Continent	2013–2019
Miss Intercontinental	2017
Miss Asia Pacific World	2013
Miss Heritage	2013
Miss Tourism International	1994, 2006
Miss Asia Pacific International	1968–2005
Miss Tourism	2005, 2007
Miss Teenage Intercontinental	1975–1978
Miss World Amber / Miss Ambar Del Mundo	1978
International Teen Princess	1974, 1970
Queen of Pacific	1969–1972, 1974, 1975
Miss Nations	1964

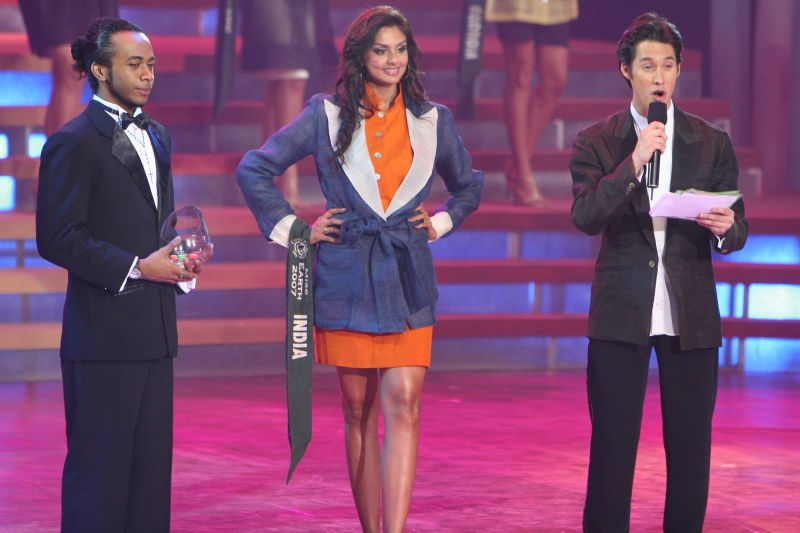
Pooja Chitgopekar, Femina Miss India Earth 2007 and Miss Earth Air 2007 during Miss Earth 2007

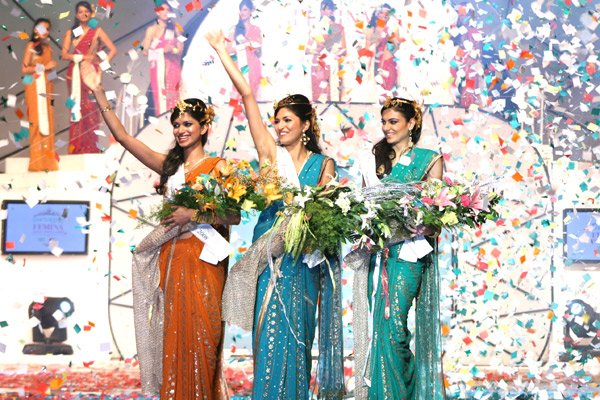
Femina Miss India 2008 (from left to right) Harshita Saxena (Resigned-Femina Miss India Earth 2008), Parvathy Omanakuttan (Femina Miss India World 2008) and Simran Kaur Mundi (Femina Miss India Universe 2008)

Miss India has been sending representatives to the Miss Universe pageant since 1952, starting with Indrani Rehman, and to the Miss World pageant since 1959, with Fleur Ezekiel.

In 1970, Zeenat Aman became the first Indian and South Asian woman to win the Miss Asia Pacific title.

In 1991, Femina Miss India gained the rights to send Indian contestants to the Miss International pageant.

In 1994, Sushmita Sen won Miss Universe, becoming the first Indian woman to hold the title. That same year, Aishwarya Rai, the runner-up at Miss India, won Miss World. Both Sen and Rai later pursued successful careers in Bollywood.

Their success led to the rise of grooming institutions that prepared young women for pageants, significantly increasing participation. Diana Hayden, Miss India World 1997, won Miss World that same year. In 1999, Yukta Mookhey, Miss India World, also won Miss World.

In 2000, all three Miss India winners: Lara Dutta (Miss Universe), Priyanka Chopra (Miss World), and Diya Mirza (Miss Asia Pacific) won their respective international titles. Australia is the only other country to have achieved this in 1972.

In 2002, the third title in Femina Miss India was renamed Femina Miss India-Earth to send representatives to the newly launched Miss Earth pageant, focused on environmental advocacy. A finalist was then sent to Miss International.

From 2007 to 2009, three equal titleholders represented India at Miss Universe, Miss World, and Miss Earth. In 2010, the rights to send contestants to Miss Universe were transferred to a new pageant, I Am She - Miss Universe India. By 2013, The Times Group reacquired the Miss Universe rights and launched the Miss Diva pageant.

In 2010, the third title at Femina Miss India was renamed Femina Miss India-International, with winners representing India at Miss International. That same year, Nicole Faria became the first Indian to win the Miss Earth title in Vietnam, leaving Miss International as the only major global pageant India has yet to win.

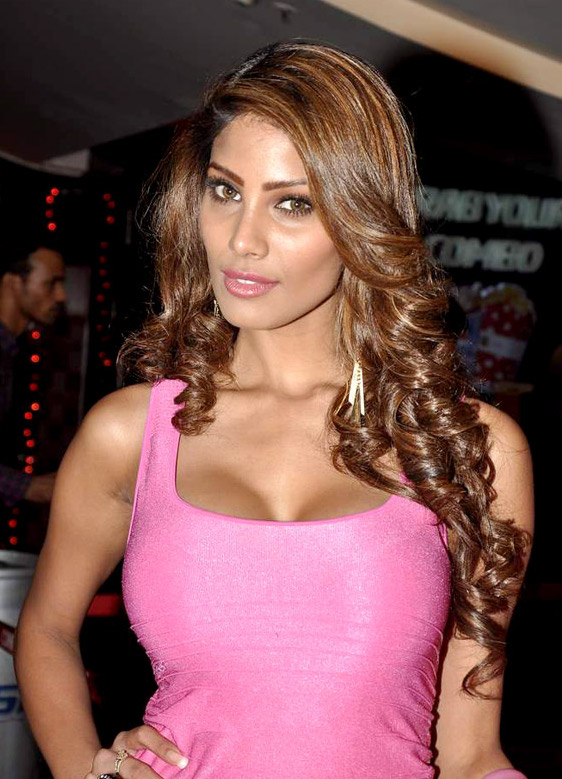
Nicole Faria, Femina Miss India Earth 2010 and Miss Earth 2010

In 2012, Himangini Singh Yadu became the first Indian and Asian to win the Miss Asia Pacific World title, sent by the I Am She - Miss Universe India pageant. In 2013, Srishti Rana won the same title, marking a rare back-to-back victory for India and becoming the first Miss Diva winner to claim the Miss Asia Pacific World crown.

In 2014, Asha Bhat won Miss Supranational, becoming the first Indian woman to win the title and the second Asian overall. That same year, Ruhi Singh, the first Femina Miss India Universal Peace and Humanity, won the Miss Universal Peace and Humanity pageant in Lebanon.

India also achieved a rare triple victory at the Miss Asia Pacific World pageant, with Swetha Raj winning in 2014 after the previous winner was dethroned. She was sent by the Miss India Australia organization.

== International winners ==
Reita Faria from India won Miss World in 1966, becoming the first Asian woman to achieve this honor and marking India's first major international pageant victory. In 1994, Sushmita Sen became the first Indian to win Miss Universe. That same year, Aishwarya Rai was crowned Miss World, making India the last country in the 20th century to win both Miss Universe and Miss World in the same year.

Diana Hayden won Miss World in 1997, followed by Yukta Mookhey in 1999. In 2000, Lara Dutta and Priyanka Chopra repeated India's earlier success, with Dutta winning Miss Universe and Chopra winning Miss World. This remains the most recent time (as of 2024) that a country has won both titles in the same year and the only time it has happened in the 21st century.

In 2010, Nicole Faria from Bangalore became the first Indian woman to win Miss Earth. Manushi Chhillar won Miss World 2017, and in 2021, Harnaaz Sandhu became the third Indian woman to win Miss Universe, the latest Big Four titleholder from India as of 2024.

Here is a list of Indian winners below:

Winners of major international Beauty pageant
Pageant	Titles	Winning year(s)	Winner(s)
Miss World	6		
Miss World	6	1966	Reita Faria
Miss World	6	1994	Aishwarya Rai
Miss World	6	1997	Diana Hayden
Miss World	6	1999	Yukta Mookhey
Miss World	6	2000	Priyanka Chopra
Miss World	6	2017	Manushi Chhillar
Miss Universe	3		
Miss Universe	3	1994	Sushmita Sen
Miss Universe	3	2000	Lara Dutta
Miss Universe	3	2021	Harnaaz Sandhu
Miss Earth	1		
Miss Earth	1	2010	Nicole Faria
Miss International	0		
Miss International	0	—	—

The following is the list of Indian winners in various other international pageants:

Winners of other International Beauty pageant
Pageant	Titles	Winning year(s)	Winner(s)
Miss Supranational	2	2014	Asha Bhat
Miss Supranational	2	2016	Srinidhi Shetty
Miss Asia Pacific World	3		
Miss Asia Pacific World	3	2012	Himangini Singh Yadu
Miss Asia Pacific World	3	2013	Srishti Rana
Miss Asia Pacific World	3	2014	Shweta Raj
Miss Asia Pacific International	3		
Miss Asia Pacific International	3	1970	Zeenat Aman
Miss Asia Pacific International	3	1973	Tara Anne Fonseca
Miss Asia Pacific International	3	2000	Dia Mirza
Miss Tourism	2		
Miss Tourism	2	2005	Sonal Chauhan
Miss Tourism	2	2007	Priyanka Shah
Miss Teenage Intercontinental	1	1978	Elizabeth Anita Reddi
Miss World Amber / Miss Ambar Del Mundo	1	1978	Mala Rai Singhani
International Teen Princess	1	1974	Radha Bartake

- In 1966 India won Miss World but the representative was sent by the Eve's Weekly Miss India organization.
- In 2012, India won Miss Asia Pacific World 2012 but the representative from India was sent by the organization I Am She - Miss Universe India.
- Asha Bhat (Miss Supranational 2014), Srinidhi Ramesh Shetty (Miss Supranational 2016) and Srishti Rana (Miss Asia Pacific World 2013) were the winners of Miss Diva, not Femina Miss India.

=== Multiple victories in the same year ===
The following is the list of India's multiple victories in major international pageants:

Year	Pageant	Winner	Number of titles
1994	Miss Universe	Sushmita Sen	2
1994	Miss World	Aishwarya Rai	2
2000	Miss Universe	Lara Dutta	3
2000	Miss World	Priyanka Chopra	3
2000	Miss Asia Pacific International	Dia Mirza	3
2016	Mister World	Rohit Khandelwal	2
2016	Miss Supranational	Srinidhi Shetty	2

== Femina Miss India Titleholders (2017–present) ==
Edition	Year	Final Venue	Femina Miss India World	1st Runner-up	2nd Runner-up	Entrants
54	2017	Yash Raj Studios, Mumbai	Haryana; Manushi Chhillar	Jammu & Kashmir; Sana Dua (Miss India United Continents 2017)	Bihar; Priyanka Kumari (Miss India Intercontinental 2017)	30
55	2018	DOME, Sardar Vallabhbhai Patel Indoor Stadium, Mumbai	Tamil Nadu; Anukreethy Vas	Haryana; Meenakshi Chaudhary (Miss Grand International India 2018)	Andhra Pradesh; Shreya Rao Kamavarapu	30
56	2019	DOME, Sardar Vallabhbhai Patel Indoor Stadium, Mumbai	Rajasthan; Suman Rao	Chhattisgarh; Shivani Jadhav (Miss Grand International India 2019)	Bihar; Shreya Shanker (Miss United Continents India 2019)	30
57	2020	Hyatt Regency, Mumbai	Telangana; Manasa Varanasi	Haryana; Manika Sheokand (Miss Grand International India 2021)	Uttar Pradesh; Manya Singh	31
58	2022	Jio World Convention Centre, Mumbai	Karnataka; Sini Shetty	Rajasthan; Rubal Shekhawat	Uttar Pradesh; Shinata Chauhan	30
59	2023	Imphal, Manipur	Rajasthan; Nandini Gupta	Delhi; Shreya Poonja	Manipur; Thounaojam Strela Luwang	30
60	2024	Famous Studios, Mumbai	Madhya Pradesh; Nikita Porwal	Union Territory; Rekha Pandey	Gujarat; Aayushi Dholakia	30
61	2026	KIIT, Bhubaneswar	Goa; Sadhvi Satish Sail	Maharashtra; Rajnandini Pawar G	Union Territory; Sree Advaita G	30

=== Femina Miss India Editions ===
Year	Date	Femina Miss India	Entrants	Presenter(s)	Pageant venue	Broadcaster
2000	15 January 2000	Lara Dutta	26	Rahul Khanna, Malaika Arora	Holiday Inn, Pune	Sony TV
2001	27 January 2001	Celina Jaitly	30	Aman Verma, Malaika Arora, Sukhbir	Mumbai	Sony TV
2002	19 January 2002	Neha Dhupia	26	Malaika Arora, Raageshwari Loomba	NAC Grounds, Hyderabad	Sony TV
2003	31 January 2003	Nikita Anand	26	Aman Verma, Malaika Arora	ITC Grand Maratha Sheraton, Mumbai	Sony TV
2004	26 March 2004	Tanushree Dutta	29	Gul Panag, Ronit Roy	Bandra Kurla Complex, Mumbai	Sony TV
2005	27 March 2005	Amrita Thapar	23	Mona Singh, Samir Soni	ITC Grand Central, Mumbai	Sony TV
2006	18 March 2006	Neha Kapur	25	Mini Mathur, R. Madhavan	Grand Hyatt Mumbai Hotel & Residences, Mumbai	Sony TV & Zoom TV
2007	8 April 2007	Sarah-Jane Dias	24	Sajid Khan, Mona Singh	Sun-n-Sand Hotel, Mumbai	Sony TV & Zoom TV
2008	5 April 2008	Parvathy Omanakuttan	30	Dia Mirza, R. Madhavan	Sun-n-Sand Hotel, Mumbai	Sony TV
2009	5 April 2009	Pooja Chopra	20	Malaika Arora, R. Madhavan	Sahara Star, Mumbai	Sony TV & Zoom TV
2010	30 April 2010	Manasvi Mamgai	18	Mandira Bedi, Rohit Roy	National Centre for the Performing Arts, Mumbai	Sony TV & Zoom TV
2011	14 April 2011	Kanishtha Dhankhar	20	Manish Paul, Sonu Sood	Novotel, Juhu Beach, Mumbai	Sony TV & Zoom TV
2012	30 March 2012	Vanya Mishra	20	Karan Tacker, Karan Wahi & Gurmeet Choudhary	Bhavan's College Ground, Andheri (West), Mumbai	Zoom TV
2013	24 March 2013	Navneet Kaur Dhillon	23	Manish Paul	Yash Raj Studios, Mumbai	Colors TV
2014	5 April 2014	Koyal Rana	24	Manish Paul, Riteish Deshmukh	Yash Raj Studios, Mumbai	Colors TV
2015	28 March 2015	Aditi Arya	21	Manish Paul	Yash Raj Studios, Mumbai	Colors TV & Zoom TV
2016	9 April 2016	Priyadarshini Chatterjee	21	Karan Johar, Manish Paul & Shahrukh Khan	Yash Raj Studios, Mumbai	Colors TV & Zoom TV
2017	25 June 2017	Manushi Chhillar	30	Karan Johar, Riteish Deshmukh	Yash Raj Studios, Mumbai	Colors TV
2018	19 June 2018	Anukreethy Vas	30	Ayushmann Khurrana, Karan Johar	DOME, Sardar Vallabhbhai Patel Indoor Stadium, Mumbai	Colors TV
2019	15 June 2019	Suman Rao	30	Karan Johar, Manish Paul	DOME, Sardar Vallabhbhai Patel Indoor Stadium, Mumbai	Colors TV
2020	10 February 2021	Manasa Varanasi	31	Aparshakti Khurana	Hyatt Regency, Mumbai	Colors TV
2022	3 July 2022	Sini Shetty	30	Manish Paul	Jio World Convention Centre, Mumbai	Colors TV
2023	15 April 2023	Nandini Gupta	30	Manish Paul, Bhumi Pednekar	Indoor Stadium, Khuman Lampak Sports Complex, Imphal, Manipur	Colors TV
2024	16 October 2024	Nikita Porwal	30	Anusha Dandekar, Nehal Chudasama & Sachin Kumbhar	Famous Studios, Mumbai	Doordarshan, JioCinema & Zoom TV
2026	18 April 2026	Sadhvi Satish Sail	30	Manish Paul, Sarah-Jane Dias	KIIT, Bhubaneswar	Zoom TV, ZEE5

== Miss Diva ==
Established in 2013, Miss Diva is a separate pageant organization from Femina Miss India, though both are owned by the Times Group. Its primary objective is to select India's representative for the Miss Universe competition through an annual national pageant.

In addition to Miss Universe, Miss Diva also sent delegates to Miss International (in 2013), Miss Supranational (since 2013), Miss Asia Pacific World (in 2013), and Miss Earth (in 2014).

However, in 2024, the Miss Diva organization withdrew its license to participate in Miss Universe. They have hinted at a possible return in the future. Currently, Miss Diva sends representatives to the Miss Supranational and, starting in 2025, to the Miss Cosmo pageant. The most recent delegate they sent competed in the 2024 edition.

== Representatives to the Big Four pageants ==
The following women have represented India in the Big Four international beauty pageants, the four major international beauty pageants for women. These are Miss World, Miss Universe, Miss International, Miss Earth.

Color key

- : Declared as winner
- : Ended as runner-up or top 5/6 qualification
- : Ended as one of the finalists/semi-finalists
- : Unplaced but given special award(s)

=== Miss World ===
Year	Delegate	State	Placement & Performance	
Year	Delegate	State	Placements	Special award(s)
1959	Fleur Ezekiel	Maharashtra	Unplaced	
1960	Iona Pinto	Maharashtra	Unplaced	
1961	Veronica Leonora Torcato	Maharashtra	Unplaced	
1962	Ferial Karim	Maharashtra	Top 15	
1966	Reita Faria	Maharashtra	Miss World 1966	2 Special Awards: Best Body Award; Best in Evening Dress Award
1968	Jane Coelho	New Delhi	Unplaced	
1969	Adina Shellim	Maharashtra	Unplaced	
1970	Heather Corinne Faville	Maharashtra	Top 15	
1971	Prema Narayan	Andhra Pradesh	Unplaced	
1972	Malathi Basappa	Karnataka	4th Runner-up	
1974	Kiran Dholakia	Maharashtra	Unplaced	
1975	Anjana Sood	Himachal Pradesh	Top 15	
1976	Naina Balsavar	Maharashtra	Candidate withdrew from participation 1	
1977	Veena Prakash	Maharashtra	Candidate withdrew from participation 2	
1978	Kalpana Iyer	Tamil Nadu	Top 15	3 Special Awards: Most Popular Delegate; Top 15 – Photographer's choice; Top 20 – Miss Talented
1979	Raina Winifred Mendonica	Maharashtra	Unplaced	1 Special Award: Top 10 – Photographer's choice
1980	Elizabeth Anita Reddi	Andhra Pradesh	Top 15	
1981	Deepti Divakar	Andhra Pradesh	Unplaced	
1982	Uttara Mhatre	Maharashtra	Unplaced	
1983	Sweety Grewal	Punjab	Unplaced	
1984	Suchita Kumar	Maharashtra	Unplaced	
1985	Sharon Mary Clarke	Maharashtra	Unplaced	
1986	Maureen Mary Lestourgeon	Maharashtra	Unplaced	
1987	Manisha Kohli	Punjab	Unplaced	
1988	Anuradha Kottur	Maharashtra	Unplaced	
1989	Shabnam Patel	Maharashtra	Unplaced	
1990	Naveeda Mehdi	Maharashtra	Unplaced	
1991	Ritu Singh	New Delhi	Top 10	
1992	Shyla Lopez	Karnataka	Unplaced	
1993	Karminder Kaur	Punjab	Unplaced	1 Special Award: Best in National costume
1994	Aishwarya Rai	Karnataka	Miss World 1994	2 Special Awards: Miss World – Asia and Oceania; Miss Photogenic
1995	Preeti Mankotia	Punjab	Unplaced	
1996	Rani Jeyraj	Tamil Nadu	Top 5	2 Special Awards: Miss World – Asia and Oceania; Spectacular Evening Gown
1997	Diana Hayden	Telangana	Miss World 1997	3 Special Awards: Miss World – Asia and Oceania; Miss Photogenic; Spectacular Swimwear'
1998	Annie Thomas	Kerala	Unplaced	
1999	Yukta Mookhey	Maharashtra	Miss World 1999	1 Special Award: Miss World – Asia and Oceania
2000	Priyanka Chopra	Jharkhand	Miss World 2000	1 Special Award: Miss World – Asia and Oceania
2001	Sara Corner	Karnataka	Unplaced	
2002	Shruti Sharma	Uttar Pradesh	Top 20	
2003	Ami Vashi	Gujarat	Top 5	1 Special Award: Top 21 – Miss World Talent
2004	Lakshmi Pandit	Maharashtra	Candidate ineligible to participate 3	
2004	Sayali Bhagat^{1}	Maharashtra	Unplaced	1 Special Award: Top 20 – Miss World Top Model
2005	Sindhura Gadde	Andhra Pradesh	Top 15	
2006	Natasha Suri	Maharashtra	Top 17	3 Special Awards: 2nd Runner-Up – Miss World Beach Beauty; 2nd Runner-Up – Best Designer Gown; Top 10 – Miss World Talent
2007	Sarah-Jane Dias	Maharashtra	Unplaced	1 Special Award: Top 18 – Miss World Talent
2008	Parvathy Omanakuttan	Kerala	1st Runner-up	3 Special Awards: Miss World – Asia and Oceania; 2nd Runner-Up – Miss World Top Model; Top 10 – Miss World Beach Beauty
2009	Pooja Chopra	Maharashtra	Top 16	2 Special Awards: Winner – Beauty With a Purpose; Top 6 – Miss World Sports
2010	Manasvi Mamgai	Uttarakhand	Unplaced	3 Special Awards: Dances of the World Performer; Top 20 – Miss World Beach Beauty; Top 20 – Miss World Top Model
2011	Kanishtha Dhankhar	Haryana	Top 31	2 Special Awards: Top 10 – Miss World Top Model; Top 10 – Beauty with a Purpose
2012	Vanya Mishra	Punjab	Top 7	6 Special Awards: Winner – Beauty With a Purpose Award; Winner – Multimedia Award; Dances of the World Performer; Top 16 – Interview Round; Top 40 – Miss World Beach Beauty; Top 47 – Miss World Top Model
2013	Navneet Kaur Dhillon	Punjab	Top 20	3 Special Awards: Winner – Multimedia Award; Top 10 – Beauty with a Purposep; Top 20 – Interview Round
2014	Koyal Rana	New Delhi	Top 11	9 Special Awards: Miss World - Asia; Winner – Beauty With a Purpose; Winner – World Fashion Designer Dress; Dances of the World Performer; Top 5 – Miss World Beach Beauty; Top 5 – Multimedia Award; Top 10 – The People's Choice; Top 20 – Miss World Top Model; Top 32 – Miss World Sport
2015	Aditi Arya	Haryana	Unplaced	6 Special Awards: Top 5 – Multimedia Award; Top 5 – People's Choice Award; Top 10 – World Fashion Designer Dress; Top 25 – Beauty with a Purpose; Top 30 – Miss World Talent; Top 30 – Miss World Top Model
2016	Priyadarshini Chatterjee	Assam	Top 20	2 Special Awards: Top 5 – Beauty with a Purpose; Top 21 – Miss World Talent
2017	Manushi Chhillar	Haryana	Miss World 2017	5 Special Awards: Winner – Head-to-Head Challenge (Group 9); Winner – Beauty with a Purpose; Top 9 – Multimedia Award; Top 9 – People's Choice Award; Top 30 – Miss World Top Model
2018	Anukreethy Vas	Tamil Nadu	Top 30	3 Special Awards: Winner – Head-to-Head Challenge; Top 10 – Multimedia Award; Top 18 – Miss World Talent
2019	Suman Rao	Rajasthan	2nd Runner-up	5 Special Awards: Miss World - Asia; Winner – Head-to-Head Challenge; 2nd Runner-up – Miss World Top Model; Top 10 – Beauty With A Purpose; Top 27 – Miss World Talent
2021	Manasa Varanasi	Telangana	Top 13	2 Special Awards: Top 6 – Beauty With A Purpose; Top 27 – Miss World Talent
2023	Sini Shetty	Karnataka	Top 8	5 Special Awards: Miss World Asia & Oceania; Winner – World Fashion Designer Dress; Top 14 – Miss World Talent; Top 20 – Miss World Top Model; Top 25 – Head-to-Head Challenge
2025	Nandini Gupta	Rajasthan	Top 20	1 Special Award: Winner – Miss World Top Model; Top 24 – Miss World Talent
2026	Nikita Porwal	Madhya Pradesh	Top 40	2 Special Award: Top 21 – Miss World Top Model; Top 60 – Beauty With A Purpose
2027	Sadhvi Satish Sail	Goa	TBA	TBA

- The Femina Miss India did not send delegates in 1959–1970, 1972, 1975. Femina got the franchise in 1976. Femina also sent delegates to Miss World in 1971 and 1974.
- ^Note 1: For Miss World 1976, India withdrew in protest against the presence of two South African entries - one white and one black - in conformity with the apartheid policy of racial separation.
- ^Note 2: For Miss World 1977, India withdrew in protest against Apartheid. Black women were not allowed to compete in Miss South Africa (there were two competitions one for whites, that winner was sent to the international one; and another for blacks). Thus only white contestants were sent from South Africa till Apartheid came to an end in the early 1990s.
- ^Note 3: The candidate was disqualified from participating because she was married.
- ^Note 4: For the year 2020, due to the impact of COVID-19 pandemic, no pageant held.
- ^Note 5: For the year 2022, Miss World 2021 was rescheduled to 16 March 2022 due to the COVID-19 pandemic outbreak in Puerto Rico, no edition started in 2022.
- ^Note 6: For the year 2024, Miss World 2023 was rescheduled to 9 March 2024, no edition started in 2023.

=== Miss Supranational ===
Year	Delegate	Age^{[α]}	State	Competition performance	
Year	Delegate	Age^{[α]}	State	Placements	Special award(s)
2013	Vijaya Sharma	20	New Delhi	Top 20	
2014	Asha Bhat	22	Karnataka	Miss Supranational 2014	2 Special Awards: Miss Talented; Top 5 – Miss Internet
2015	Aafreen Vaz	24	Karnataka	Top 10	4 Special Awards: Miss Supranational - Asia and Oceania; 1st Runner Up – Miss Internet; Top 10 – Miss Supranational Top Model; Top 10 – Best National Costume
2016	Srinidhi Shetty	24	Karnataka	Miss Supranational 2016	2 Special Awards: Miss Supranational - Asia and Oceania; 3rd Runner-up – Miss Mobstar
2017	Peden Ongmu Namgyal	22	Sikkim	Top 25	2 Special Awards: 2nd Runner-up – Miss Talent; 3rd Runner-up – Best in Swimsuit
2018	Aditi Hundia	21	Rajasthan	Top 25	
2019	Shefali Sood	24	Uttar Pradesh	Top 25	1 Special Award: Top 10 – Miss Influencer
2021	Aavriti Choudhary	23	Madhya Pradesh	Top 12	
2022	Ritika Khatnani	20	Maharashtra	Top 12	5 Special Awards: Miss Supranational Asia; Miss Photogenic; Top 3 – Miss Talent; Top 10 – Supra Influencer; Top 11 – Top Model
2023	Pragnya Ayyagari	21	Telangana	Top 12	4 Special Awards: Miss Supranational Asia; Top 5 – Supra Chat; Top 7 – Miss Talent; Top 10 – Supra Fan-Vote
2024	Sonal Kukreja	26	Rajasthan	Top 12	1 Special Award: Top 13 – Miss Influencer
2025	Ayushree Malik	19	New Delhi	Top 24	2 Special Awards: Winner – Supra Chat; Top 21 – Miss Influencer
2026	Avni Gupta	22	Uttar Pradesh	Top 12	

The Femina Miss India organization did not send a delegate to Miss Supranational in the years 2009–2012.

=== Miss Cosmo ===
Year	Delegate	Age^{[α]}	State	Competition performance	
Year	Delegate	Age^{[α]}	State	Placements	Special award(s)
2025	Vipra Mehta	21	Rajasthan	Top 21	4 Special Nominations: Top 3 – Cosmo Social Ambassador; Top 5 – Best In Swimsuit; Top 17 – The T.E.A Cosmo Carnival Show; Top 26 – Cosmo Impactful Beauty Award
2026	Avani Kakekochhi	25	Karnataka	TBA	

== Former franchises ==
=== Miss Universe ===
Year	Delegate	State	Placement & Performance	
Year	Delegate	State	Placements	Special award(s)
1952	Indrani Rehman	Tamil Nadu	Unplaced	
1964	Meher Castelino Mistri	Maharashtra	Unplaced	
1965	Persis Khambatta	Maharashtra	Unplaced	
1966	Yasmin Daji	Maharashtra	3rd Runner-up	2 Special Awards: Winner – Evening Gown Round; Top 3 – Swimsuit Round
1967	Nayyara Mirza	Delhi	Unplaced	
1968	Anjum Mumtaz Barg	Maharashtra	Unplaced	
1969	Kavita Bhambhani	Maharashtra	Unplaced	
1970	Veena Sajnani	Maharashtra	Unplaced	
1971	Raj Gill	Maharashtra	Unplaced	
1972	Roopa Satyan	Delhi	Top 12	
1973	Farzana Habib	Maharashtra	Top 12	
1974	Shailini Bhavnath Dholakia	Maharashtra	Top 12	
1975	Meenakshi Kurpad	Maharashtra	Unplaced	
1976	Naina Sudhir Balsavar	Uttar Pradesh	Unplaced	
1977	Bineeta Bose	Maharashtra	Unplaced	
1978	Alamjeet Kaur Chauhan	Punjab	Unplaced	1 Special Award: Best National Costume
1979	Swaroop Sampat	Maharashtra	Unplaced	
1980	Sangeeta Bijlani	Maharashtra	Unplaced	1 Special Award: Best National Costume
1981	Rachita Kumar	Maharashtra	Unplaced	
1982	Pamela Chaudry Singh	Delhi	Unplaced	
1983	Rekha Hande	Karnataka	Unplaced	
1984	Juhi Chawla	Punjab	Unplaced	1 Special Award: Best National Costume
1985	Sonu Walia	Delhi	Unplaced	
1986	Mehr Jessia	Maharashtra	Unplaced	
1987	Priyadarshini Pradhan	Delhi	Unplaced	
1989	Dolly Minhas	Punjab	Unplaced	
1990	Suzanne Sablok	Maharashtra	Top 10	
1991	Christabelle Howie	Tamil Nadu	Unplaced	
1992	Madhushree "Madhu" Sapre	Maharashtra	2nd Runner-up	3 Special Awards: 1st Runner-up – Swimsuit Competition; 1st Runner-up – Evening Gown; 4th Runner-up – Interview Round
1993	Namrata Shirodkar	Maharashtra	Top 6	2 Special Awards: 2nd Runner-up – Interview Round; 2nd Runner-up – Evening Gown
1994	Sushmita Sen	Delhi	Miss Universe 1994	3 Special Awards: 1st Runner-up – Swimsuit competition; 2nd Runner-up – Evening Gown; 4th Runner-up – Interview Round
1995	Manpreet Brar	Delhi	1st Runner-up	3 Special Awards: 2nd Runner-up – Evening Gown; 3rd Runner-up – Interview Round; Top 10– Swimsuit Competition
1996	Sandhya Chib	Karnataka	Top 10	
1997	Nafisa Joseph	Karnataka	Top 10	
1998	Lymaraina D'Souza	Maharashtra	Top 10	
1999	Gul Panag	Punjab	Top 10	3 Special Awards: Winner – Interview Round; Top 5 – Evening Gown Round; Top 10 – Swimsuit Round
2000	Lara Dutta	Karnataka	Miss Universe 2000	2 Special Awards: Winner – Oscar de la Renta – Best in Swimsuit; 1st Runner-up – Best in National Costume; 2nd Runner-up – Best in Evening Gown
2001	Celina Jaitley	West Bengal	4th Runner-up	2 Special Awards: 3rd Runner-up – Swimsuit competition; 5th Runner-up – Evening Gown
2002	Neha Dhupia	Delhi	Top 10	
2003	Nikita Anand	Delhi	Unplaced	
2004	Tanushree Dutta	Jharkhand	Top 10	
2005	Amrita Thapar	Punjab	Unplaced	
2006	Neha Kapur	Delhi	Top 20	
2007	Puja Gupta	Delhi	Top 10	
2008	Simran Kaur Mundi	Maharashtra	Unplaced	2 Special Awards: Group Winner – National Costume; Top 5 – Best in Swimsuit; Top 5 – Charming Áo dài
2009	Ekta Chowdhary	Haryana	Unplaced	
2010	Ushoshi Sengupta	West Bengal	Unplaced	
2011	Vasuki Sunkavalli	Andhra Pradesh	Unplaced	
2012	Shilpa Singh	Bihar	Top 16	1 Special Award: Topped the Preliminary Interview
2013	Manasi Moghe	Maharashtra	Top 10	
2014	Noyonita Lodh	Karnataka	Top 15	1 Special Award: Top 5 – Best National Costume
2015	Urvashi Rautela	Uttarakhand	Unplaced	
2016	Roshmitha Harimurthy	Karnataka	Unplaced	
2017	Shraddha Shashidhar	Tamil Nadu	Unplaced	
2018	Nehal Chudasama	Maharashtra	Unplaced	
2019	Vartika Singh	Uttar Pradesh	Top 20	
2020	Adline Castelino	Karnataka	3rd Runner-up	
2021	Harnaaz Sandhu	Punjab	Miss Universe 2021	
2022	Divita Rai	Karnataka	Top 16	
2023	Shweta Sharda	Punjab	Top 20	

The Femina Miss India organization did not send a delegate to Miss Universe in the years 1953–1963, 2024 and onward.

=== Miss International ===
Year	Delegate	State	Placement & Performance	
Year	Delegate	State	Placements	Special award(s)
1960	Iona Pinto	Maharashtra	1st Runner-Up	
1961	Diana Valentine	New Delhi	Unplaced	
1962	Sheila Chonkar	Maharashtra	Unplaced	
1968	Sumita Sen	West Bengal	Top 15	
1969	Wendy Leslie Vaz	Maharashtra	Unplaced	
1970	Patricia D'Souza	New Delhi	Top 15	
1971	Samita Mukherjee	West Bengal	Unplaced	
1972	Indira Muthanna	Karnataka	Unplaced	
1974	Leslie Jean Hartnett	New Delhi	Unplaced	
1975	Indira Maria Bredemeyer	Maharashtra	2nd Runner-Up	
1976	Nafisa Ali	Maharashtra	2nd Runner-up	
1978	Sabita Dhanrajgir	Punjab	Unplaced	
1979	Nita Pinto	Maharashtra	Unplaced	
1980	Ulrika Karen Bredemeyer	Maharashtra	Unplaced	
1981	Meenakshi Seshadri	Tamil Nadu	Unplaced	
1982	Betty O'Connor	Maharashtra	Unplaced	
1983	Sahila Chadha	Punjab	Unplaced	
1984	Nalanda Ravindra Bhandar	West Bengal	Top 15	
1985	Vinita Seshadri Vasan	Karnataka	Unplaced	
1986	Poonam Gidwani	Maharashtra	Unplaced	
1987	Erica Maria De Sousa	Maharashtra	Top 15	
1988	Shikha Swaroop	Maharashtra	Unplaced	
1991	Preeti Mankotia	Karnataka	Top 15	
1992	Kamal Sandhu	New Delhi	Unplaced	
1993	Pooja Batra	Punjab	Top 15	
1994	Francesca Hart	Maharastra	Unplaced	
1995	Priya Gill	Punjab	Unplaced	
1996	Fleur Dominique Xavier	Maharashtra	Unplaced	
1997	Diya Abraham	Kerala	1st Runner-Up	
1998	Shwetha Jaishanker	Tamil Nadu	2nd Runner-Up	
1999	Srikrupa Murali	Karnataka	Unplaced	
2000	Gayatri Joshi	Maharashtra	Top 15	
2001	Kanwal Toor	New Delhi	Top 15	
2002	Gauahar Khan	Maharashtra	Unplaced	
2003	Shonali Nagrani	New Delhi	1st Runner-Up	
2004	Mihika Verma	Maharashtra	Top 15	
2005	Vaishali Desai	Gujarat	Unplaced	
2006	Sonal Sehgal	West Bengal	Top 12	
2007	Esha Gupta	New Delhi	Unplaced	
2008	Radha Brahmbhatt	Gujarat	Unplaced	
2009	Harshita Saxena	Goa	Unplaced	
2010	Neha Hinge	Madhya Pradesh	Top 15	
2011	Ankita Shorey	Punjab	Unplaced	
2012	Rochelle Rao	Tamil Nadu	Top 15	
2013	Gurleen Grewal	Punjab	Unplaced	1 Special Award: 1st Runner Up – Miss Internet
2014	Jhataleka Malhotra	Maharashtra	Unplaced	2 Special Awards: Miss Internet; 3rd Runner Up – Best National Costume

The Femina Miss India organization did not send a delegate to Miss International in the years 1963–1967, 1972, 1977, 1989, 1990, 2015 and onward.

=== Miss Earth ===
Year	Delegate	State	Placement & Performance	
Year	Delegate	State	Placements	Special award(s)
2001	Shamita Singha	Maharashtra	Top 10	3 Special Awards: Best in National Costume; Miss Avon; Miss Lux
2002	Reshmi Ghosh	West Bengal	Unplaced	
2003	Shweta Vijay	Kerala	Unplaced	
2004	Jyoti Brahmin	West Bengal	Top 16	
2005	Niharika Singh	Uttarakhand	Unplaced	
2006	Amruta Patki	Maharashtra	Miss Earth Air (1st Runner-Up)	1 Special Award: Best in Long Gown
2007	Pooja Chitgopekar	Karnataka	Miss Earth Air (1st Runner-Up)	
2008	Tanvi Vyas	Gujarat	Unplaced	
2009	Shriya Kishore	Maharashtra	Top 16	
2010	Nicole Faria	Karnataka	Miss Earth 2010	2 Special Awards: Miss Talent; Miss Diamond Place
2011	Hasleen Kaur	New Delhi	Unplaced	
2012	Prachi Mishra	Uttar Pradesh	Unplaced	12 Special Awards: (gold) – Miss Friendship; (gold) – Miss Congeniality; (gold) – Best in Swimsuit; (gold) – Best in Resort Wear; (gold) – Miss MyPhone; (gold) – Miss Advance Placenta; (gold) – I Love My Planet School Campaign; (silver) – Evening Gown Competition; (silver) – Miss Photogenic; (silver) – Press Presentation; (bronze) – Trivia Challenge; (bronze) – Resorts Wear competition (Group 3)
2013	Sobhita Dhulipala	Andhra Pradesh	Unplaced	5 Special Awards: (gold) – Miss Photogenic; (gold) – Miss Earth Eco Beauty; (gold) – Miss Ever Bilena; Top 15 – Miss Talent; Top 15 – Best in Resort Wear
2014	Alankrita Sahai	New Delhi	Unplaced	8 Special Awards: (gold) – Miss Earth Pagudpud; (gold) – Miss Hannah's Beach Resort Best in Casual Wear; (gold) – Best Evening Gown; (silver) – Miss Photogenic; (silver) – Besuty for a Cause; (bronze) – Best in Swimsuit; (bronze) – Best National Costume; Top 10 – Miss Eco - Beauty

The Femina Miss India organization did not send a delegate to Miss Earth in the year 2015 and onward.

=== Miss Grand International ===
Year	Delegate	State	Placement & Performance	
Year	Delegate	State	Placements	Special award(s)
2015	Vartika Singh	Uttar Pradesh	2nd Runner-Up	3 Special Awards: Best in Social Media; Top 20 – Best National Costume; Top 10 – Highest Voting
2016	Pankhuri Gidwani	Uttar Pradesh	Unplaced	
2017	Anukriti Gusain	Uttarakhand	Top 20	2 Special Awards: Top 10 – Best National Costume; Top 10 – Best in Swimsuit
2018	Meenakshi Choudhary	Haryana	1st Runner-up	3 Special Awards: Top 10 – Miss Popular; Top 12 – Best National Costume; Top 10 – Pre-Arrival
2019	Shivani Jadhav	Chhattisgarh	Unplaced	3 Special Awards: For Historic Crowns Fashion Show Gala; Top 10 – Miss Popular; Top 20 – Best National Costume
2021	Manika Sheokand	Haryana	Top 20	2 Special Awards: Lottery Prizes Event; Top 20 – Pre-Arrival

The Femina Miss India organization did not send a delegate to Miss Grand International in the years 2013, 2014, 2020, 2022 and onward.

=== Miss United Continents ===
Year	Delegate	State	Placement & Performance	
Year	Delegate	State	Placements	Special award(s)
2013	Purva Rana	Himachal Pradesh	Vice Queen	1 Special Award: 2nd Runner-up – Best National Costume
2014	Gail Nicole Da Silva	Goa	1st Runner-up	2 Special Awards: Best National Costume; Miss Photogenic
2015	Sushrii Shreya Mishraa	Odisha	3rd Runner-up	2 Special Awards: Best National Costume; Miss Photogenic
2016	Lopamudra Raut	Maharashtra	2nd Runner-up	2 Special Awards: Best National Costume; 1st Runner-up – Miss Photogenic
2017	Sana Dua	Jammu and Kashmir	Top 10	
2018	Gayatri Bharadwaj	Delhi	Top 10	1 Special Award: 1st Runner-up – Best National Costume
2019	Shreya Shanker	Bihar	Unplaced	

The Femina Miss India organization did not send a delegate to Miss United Continents in the year 2020 and onward.

=== Miss Intercontinental ===
Year	Delegate	State	Placement & Performance	
Year	Delegate	State	Placements	Special award(s)
1975	Nivurti Nunim	New Delhi	2nd Runner-up	2 Special Awards: Miss Photogenic; Miss Bikini
1976	Kalpana Iyer	New Delhi	Top 19	1 Special Award: Miss Popularity
1977	Karuna Iyer	New Delhi	Unplaced	
1978	Elizabeth Anita Reddi	Andhra Pradesh	Miss Intercontinental 1978	2 Special Awards: Best National Costume; Miss Congeniality
1997	Lara Dutta	Karnataka	Miss Intercontinental 1997	
1998	Tora Khasigar	New Delhi	Unplaced	
1999	Aanchal Kumar	New Delhi	Top 12	
2001	Koena Mitra	West Bengal	Top 12	
2002	Rakhee Chaudhary	New Delhi	Top 12	
2003	Deepti Gujral	New Delhi	3rd Runner-up	
2004	Nirupama Natraian	New Delhi	Unplaced	
2005	Deepa Rajan	New Delhi	Unplaced	
2008	Sonia Jain	New Delhi	Unplaced	
2011	Ipsita Pati	Andhra Pradesh	Top 15	
2012	Bobby Layal	New Delhi	Top 10	
2013	Sharon Fernández	New Delhi	Unplaced	
2014	Chandni Sharma	New Delhi	Unplaced	
2015	Sneha Priya Roy	New Delhi	Top 17	1 Special Award: 2nd Runner-up – Best National Costume
2016	Aarushi Sharma	Himachal Pradesh	Unplaced	
2017	Priyanka Kumari	New Delhi	Unplaced	1 Special Award: Winner – Best National Costume
2018	Suman Chellani	New Delhi	Unplaced	

The Femina Miss India organization did not send a delegate to Miss Intercontinental in the years 1979–96, 2000, 2006, 2007, 2019 and onward.

=== Miss Asia Pacific International ===
Year	Delegate	State	Placement & Performance	
Year	Delegate	State	Placements	Special award(s)
1968	Anabella Crawford	New Delhi	Unplaced	1 Special Award: Miss Talent
1969	Tasneem Fakir Mohammed	New Delhi	Unplaced	
1970	Zeenat Aman	Bombay State	Miss Asia Pacific International 1970	1 Special Award: Miss Photogenic
1971	Urmila Sanandan	New Delhi	Unplaced	
1972	Samita Mukherjee	New Delhi	Unplaced	
1973	Tara Anne Fonseca	Karnataka	Miss Asia Pacific International 1973	
1974	Marilyn Theresa Ferreira	New Delhi	Unplaced	
1975	Seema Marwaha	New Delhi	Unplaced	
1976	Anna Adriane Bredemeyer	New Delhi	2nd Runner-up	
1977	Marianne De Souza	New Delhi	1st Runner-up	
1978	Preeti Koppikar	New Delhi	Unplaced	2 Special Awards: Best national costume; Miss Talent
1979	Maureen Mary Lestourgeon	New Delhi	1st Runner-up/Relinquished	
1980	Upneet Pannu	New Delhi	Unplaced	
1981	Mehjabeen Ayub Khan	New Delhi	Unplaced	1 Special Award: Miss Talent
1982	Aparna Sharma	New Delhi	Unplaced	
1983	Monica Lakhmana	New Delhi	Unplaced	
1985	Seema Malhotra	New Delhi	Semi-finalist	
1986	Ana Vasan	New Delhi	Unplaced	
1987	Jasleem Kaur	New Delhi	Unplaced	
1988	Viola Antony	New Delhi	Unplaced	
1989	Anuradha Ramani	New Delhi	Unplaced	
1992	Mehroo Jal Mistry	New Delhi	Unplaced	
1993	Namrata Shirodkar	Maharashtra	1st Runner-up	1 Special Award: Best in Evening gown
1994	Shweta Menon	Chandigarh	Top 10	
1995	Ruchi Malhotra	New Delhi	1st Runner-up	1 Special Award: Best in Evening gown
1996	Mini Menon	New Delhi	Top 10	
1997	Divya Chauhan	New Delhi	1st Runner-up	1 Special Award: Best in Evening gown
1998	Vikkitha Aggarwal	New Delhi	Unplaced	
1999	Shivangi Parikkh	New Delhi	Unplaced	
2000	Dia Mirza	Andhra Pradesh	Miss Asia Pacific International 2000	2 Special Awards: Miss Close-Up Smile; Miss AVON
2001	Maheshwari Thiagaranjan	New Delhi	Unplaced	
2002	Tina Chatwal	New Delhi	2nd Runner-up	1 Special Award: Miss Internet
2003	Shonal Rawat	West Bengal	1st Runner-up	3 Special Awards: Miss Friendship; Miss Talent; Miss Congeniality
2005	Simran Chandok	New Delhi	Unplaced	1 Special Award: Best dancer
2016	Shiva Shrishti Vyakaranam	New Delhi	Top 10	
2017	Sonika Roy	New Delhi	Unplaced	1 Special Award: Miss Zanea Shoes
2018	Abhilasha Agarwal	New Delhi	Unplaced	1 Special Award: Miss Redfox

The Femina Miss India organization did not send a delegate to Miss Asia Pacific International in the years 1984, 1990, 1991, 2004, 2006–2015, 2019 and onward.

=== Miss Asia Pacific World ===
Year	Delegate	State	Placement & Performance	
Year	Delegate	State	Placements	Special award(s)
2011	Tanvi Singla	New Delhi	3rd Runner-up	
2012	Himangini Singh Yadu	Madhya Pradesh	Miss Asia Pacific World 2012	1 Special Award: 1st Runner-up – Best in Evening Gown
2013	Srishti Rana	Haryana	Miss Asia Pacific World 2013	3 Special Awards: Best National Costume; Miss Personality; Miss Talent
2014	Swetha Raj	New Delhi	Miss Asia Pacific World 2014	1 Special Award: Miss Talent
2014	Anukriti Gusain	Uttarakhand	4th Runner-up	
2016	Akanksha Dhiman	New Delhi	Unplaced	1 Special Award: Wing of Angel

In 2014, May Myat Noe of Myanmar was initially crowned but was later dethroned. The organizers held a new pageant, where Swetha Raj of India emerged victorious, securing India a rare three-peat win in an international pageant.

== Mister India ==
Number of wins under Mister India
Pageant	Wins
Mister World	1
Mister Supranational	1

Along with Femina Miss India and Miss Diva, the Times Group also organised Mister India pageant to select representative for Mister World (Note: No national contest was held in the years 2018 and 2019–2023) and Mister Supranational.

Prateik Jain was the first Mister World India under The Times Group and Jitesh Thakur was the first ever Mister Supranational India.

=== International victories ===
- One – Mister World winner:
  - Rohit Khandelwal (2016)
- One – Mister Supranational winner:
  - Prathamesh Maulingkar (2018)

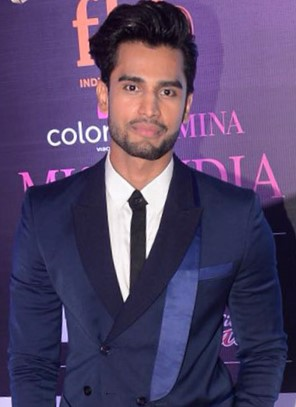
Rohit Khandelwal, Mister India World 2016 and Mister World 2016

In 2016, Rohit Khandelwal became the first Indian and thus the first Asian to win the Mister World contest title.

In 2018, Prathamesh Maulingkar became the first Indian and thus the first Asian to win the Mister Supranational contest title. This marked India, the only country to win both Miss and Mister Supranational titles.

=== Titleholders ===
Year	Titleholders	Runner-up	Mister India's achievements and placement
2026	Mister India World 2026; Shevam Singh; Mister India Supranational 2026; Abel Biju	1st Runner-up; Shiv Chordia	Mister World 2026; Shevam Singh; TBA; Mister Supranational 2026; Abel Biju (Top 20)
2025	Mister India Supranational 2025; Shubham Sharma	None	Mister Supranational 2025; Shubham Sharma (Top 20)
2024	Mister India World 2024; Gokul Ganesan	None	Mister World 2024; Gokul Ganesan (Top 10)
2021	Mister India Supranational 2021; Rahul Rajasekharan	None	Mister Supranational 2021; Rahul Rajasekharan (Top 10; Mister Supranational Asia)
2019	Mister India Supranational 2019; Varun Verma	None	Mister Supranational 2019; Varun Verma (Top 10; Mister Supranational Asia)
2017	Mister India World 2017; Jitesh Singh Deo Mister India Supranational 2018; Prathamesh Maulingkar	1st Runner-up; Abhi Khajuria 2nd Runner-up; Pavan Rao	Mister Suprantional 2018; Prathamesh Maulingkar (Winner; Best Body)
2016	Mister India World 2016; Vishnu Raj Menon Mister India Supranational 2017; Altamash Faraz	1st Runner-up; Varun Verma 2nd Runner-up; Devash khanduja	Mister World 2019; Vishnu Raj Menon (Unplaced) Mister Suprantional 2017; Altamash Faraz (Top 10; Mister Supranational Asia & Oceania )
2015	Mister India World 2015; Rohit Khandelwal Mister India Supranational 2016; Jitesh Thakur	1st Runner-up; Rahul Rajasekharan 2nd Runner-up; Prateek Gujral	Mister World 2016; Rohit Khandelwal (Winner) Mister Suprantional 2016; Jitesh Thakur (2nd Runner-up; Mister Supranational Asia )
2014	Mister India World 2014; Prateik Jain	1st Runner-up; Puneet Beniwal 2nd Runner-up; Bharat Raj	Mister World 2014; Prateik Jain (Top 10; Mister World Asia and Oceania)

== Representatives to the Big Four pageants ==
=== Current franchise ===
Mister World

Year	Delegate	Age^{[α]}	State	Competition performance	
Year	Delegate	Age^{[α]}	State	Placements	Special award(s)
2014	Prateik Jain	25	Karnataka	Top 10	6 Special Awards: Winner – Continental King of Asia & Oceania; Winner – Shot-Put Challenge; Team Winner – The Tug-O-War; 1st Runner-Up – Mister Multimedia; Top 21 – Talent Round; Top 24 – Extreme sports
2016	Rohit Khandelwal	27	Telangana	Mister World 2016	1 Special Award: Winner – Mister Multimedia
2019	Vishnu Raj Menon	28	Kerala	Unplaced	1 Special Award: 2nd Runner-Up – Mister Multimedia
2024	Gokul Ganesan	24	Tamil Nadu	Top 10	5 Special Awards: Top 5 – Multimedia Challenge; Top 5 – Top Model; Top 20 – Head-to-Head Challenge; Top 30 – Beauty With a Purpose; Top 36 – Talent Round
2026	Shevam Singh	30	Bihar	TBA	

Mister Supranational

Year	Delegate	Age^{[α]}	State	Competition performance	
Year	Delegate	Age^{[α]}	State	Placements	Special award(s)
2016	Jitesh Naresh Thakur	27	Rajasthan	2nd Runner-up	3 Special Awards: Winner – Mister Supranational Asia; Winner – Top Model; 3rd Runner-Up – Mister Mobstar
2017	Altamash Faraz	26	New Delhi	Top 10	4 Special Awards: Winner – Mister Supranational Asia & Oceania; 1st Runner-Up – Best in Swimsuit; 1st Runner-Up – Extreme Race; 3rd Runner-Up – Best in Streetwear
2018	Prathamesh Maulingkar	27	Goa	Mister Supranational 2018	2 Special Awards: Winner – Best Body; Winner – Mister Social Media
2019	Varun Verma	27	New Delhi	Top 10	3 Special Awards: Winner – Mister Supranational Asia; Top 10 – Mister Supra Fan Vote; Top 10 – Digital Influencer
2021	Rahul Rajasekharan	32	Kerala	Top 10	4 Special Awards: Winner – Mister Supranational Asia; Winner – Mister Supra Chat; Top 10 – Digital Influencer; Top 10 – Mister Supra Fan Vote
2025	Shubham Sharma	24	Maharashtra	Top 20	2 Special Awards: Winner – Mister Influencer Opportunity; Top 10 – Supra Model of the Year
2026	Abel Biju	24	Kerala	Top 20	2 Special Awards: Winner – Mister YouTube Supra-Influencer; Top 10 – Mister Supra Influencer

Note:
- ^α Age at the time of the international pageant

The Mister India organisation did not send a delegate to Mister Supranational in the year 2022 - 2024.

== International titleholder gallery ==
=== Miss Universe ===
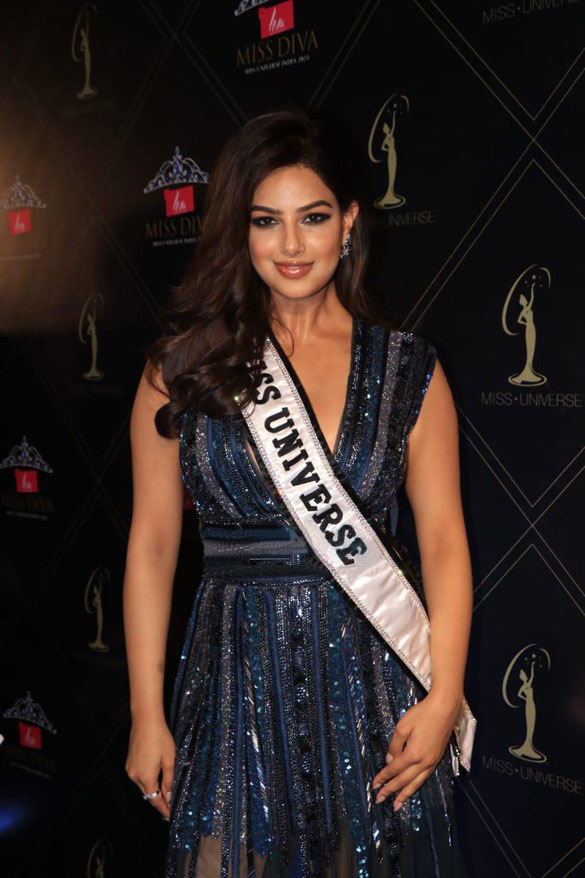
Harnaaz Sandhu, Miss Universe 2021

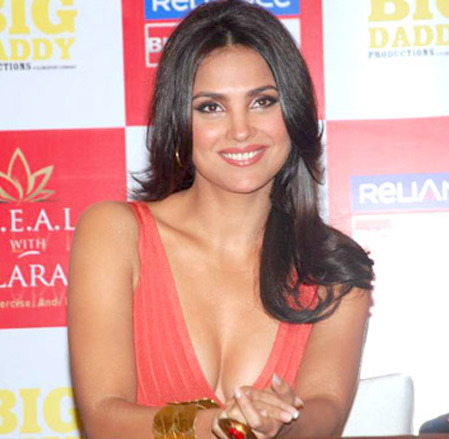
Lara Dutta, Miss Universe 2000 and
Miss Intercontinental 1997

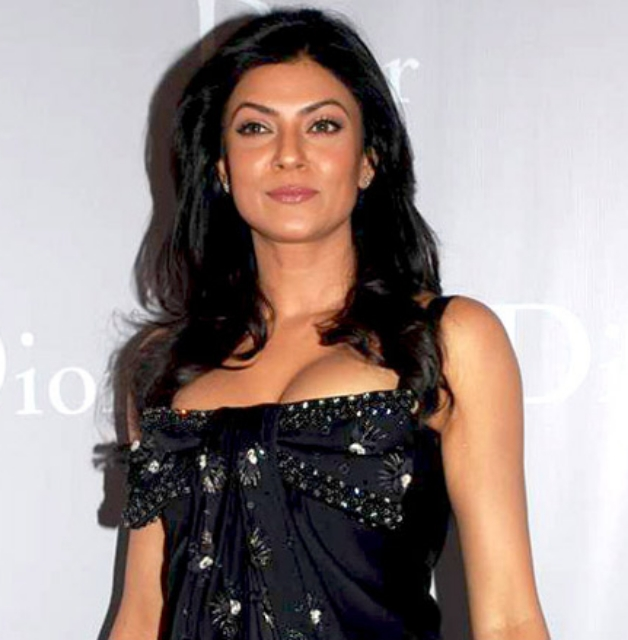
Sushmita Sen, Miss Universe 1994

=== Miss World ===
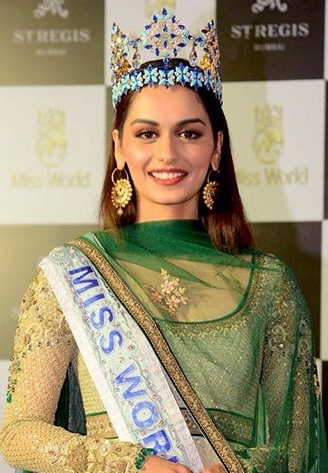
Manushi Chhillar, Miss World 2017

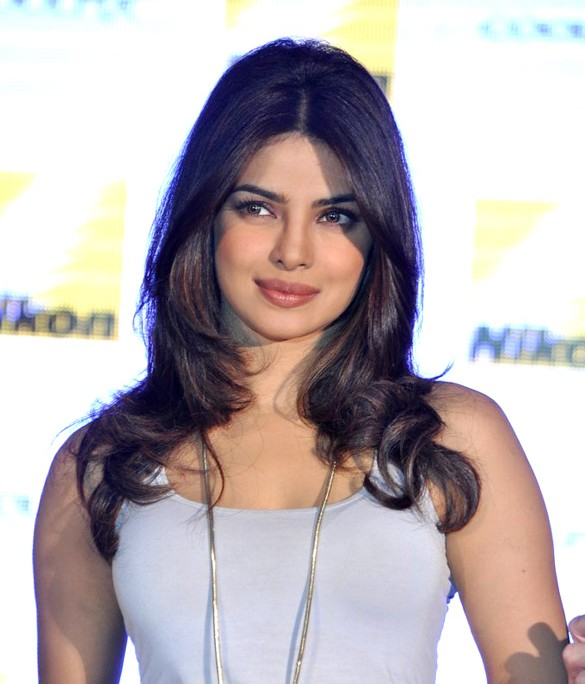
Priyanka Chopra, Miss World 2000

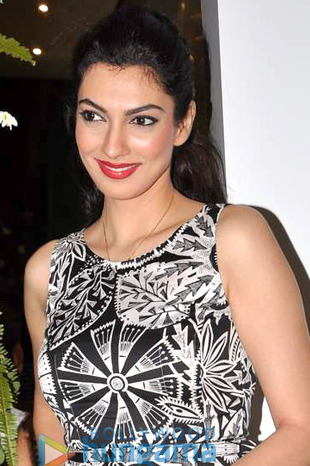
Yukta Mookhey, Miss World 1999

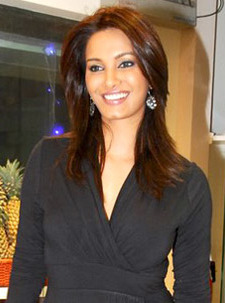
Diana Hayden, Miss World 1997

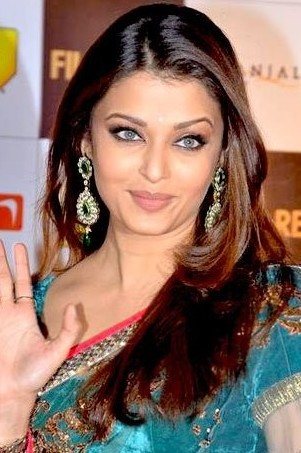
Aishwarya Rai, Miss World 1994

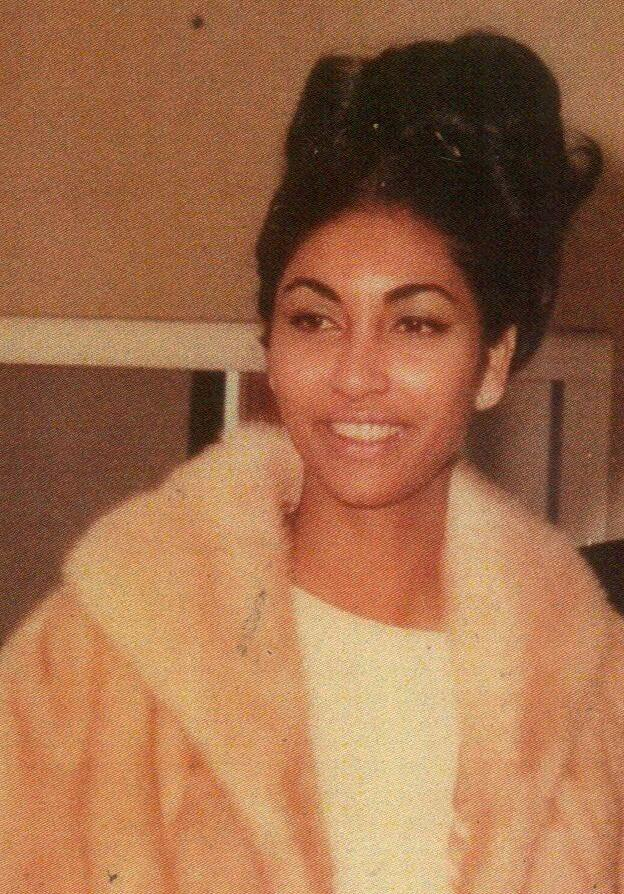
Reita Faria, Miss World 1966

=== Miss Supranational ===
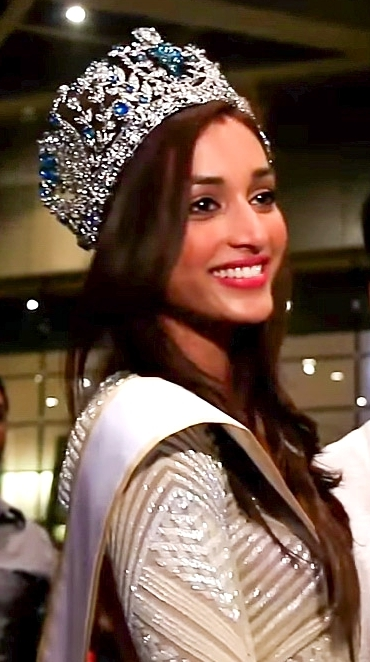
Srinidhi Shetty,
Miss Supranational 2016

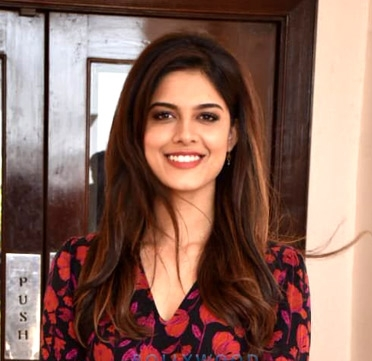
Asha Bhat,
Miss Supranational 2014

=== Miss Earth ===
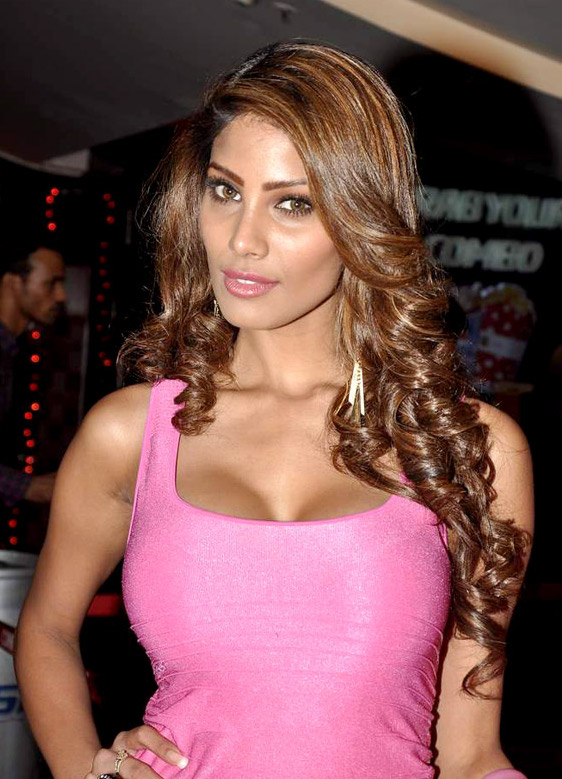
Nicole Faria, Miss Earth 2010

=== Miss Tourism International ===
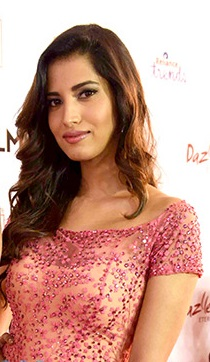
Manasvi Mamgai, Miss Tourism International 2009

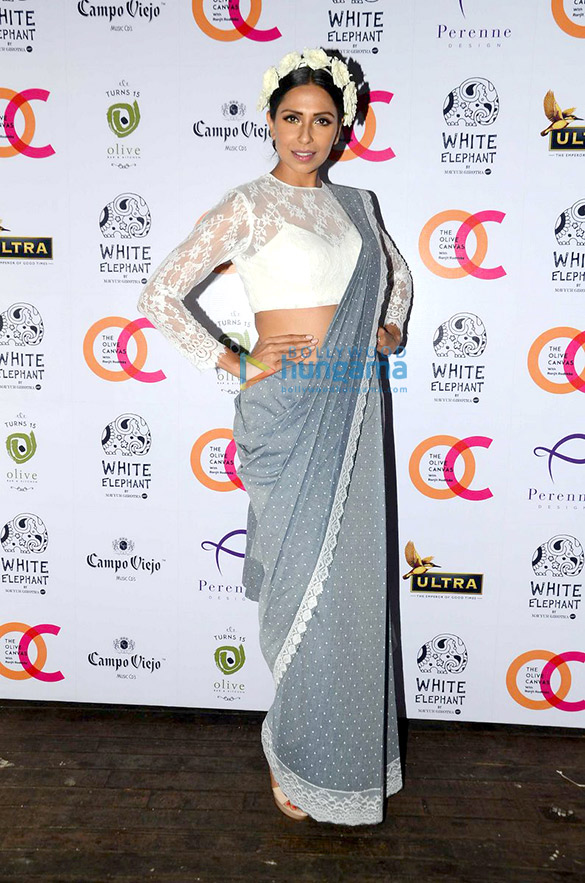
Candice Pinto, Miss Tourism International 2001

=== Miss Tourism ===
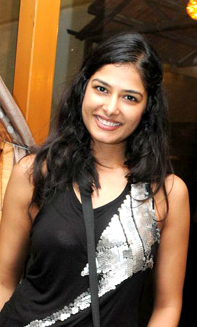
Priyanka Shah, Miss Tourism 2007

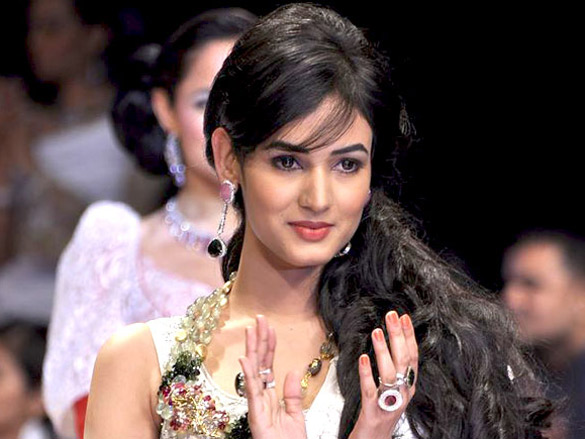
Sonal Chauhan, Miss Tourism 2005

=== Miss Asia Pacific International ===
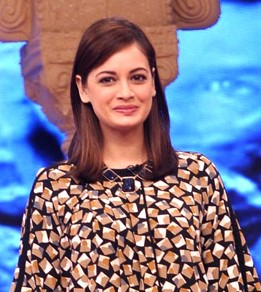
Dia Mirza, Miss Asia Pacific 2000

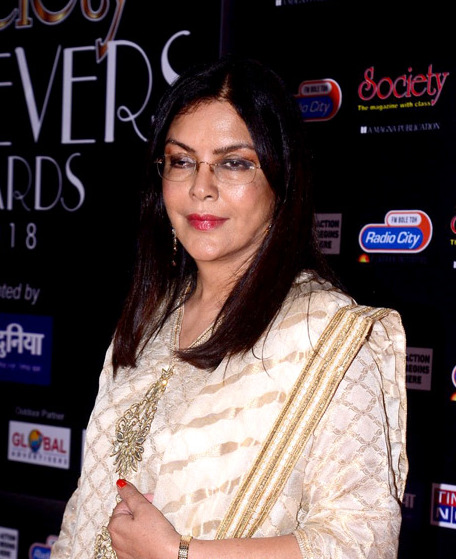
Zeenat Aman, Miss Asia Pacific 1970

=== Mister World ===
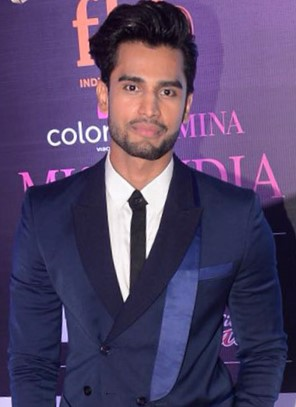
Rohit Khandelwal,
Mister World 2016

=== Mister Supernational ===
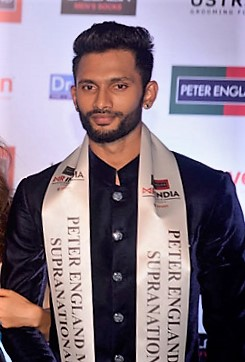
Prathamesh Maulingkar,
Mister Supranational 2018

== Titleholder gallery ==
=== Femina Miss India Universe ===
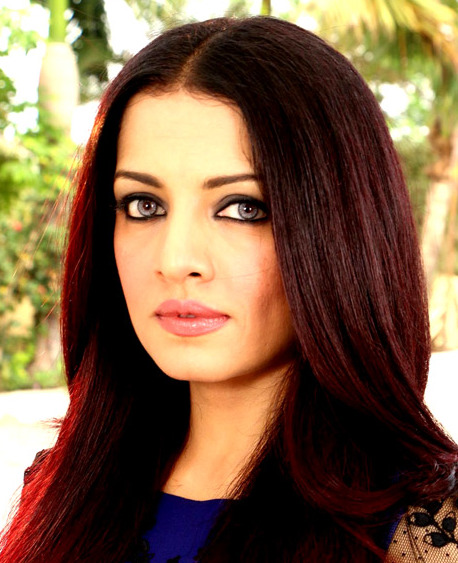
Celina Jaitley,
Miss Universe 2001 - 4th Runner-up

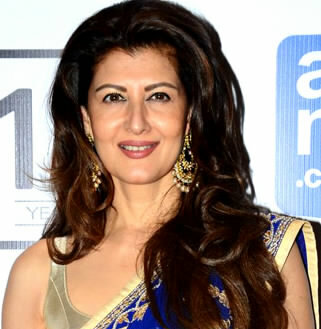
Sangeeta Bijlani,
Femina Miss India Universe 1980

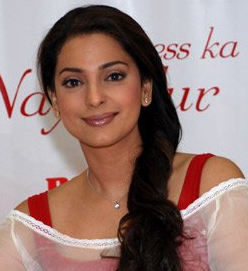
Juhi Chawla,
Femina Miss India Universe 1984

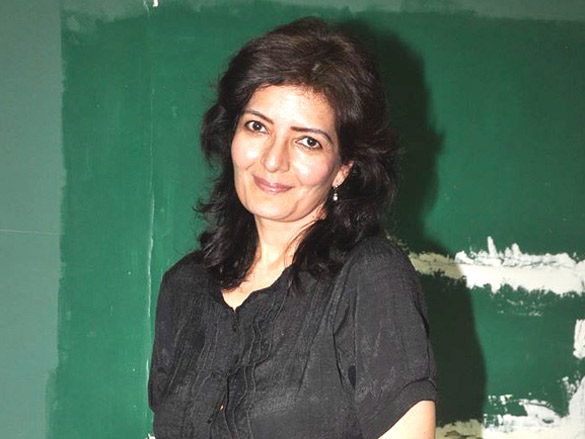
Sonu Walia,
Femina Miss India Universe 1985

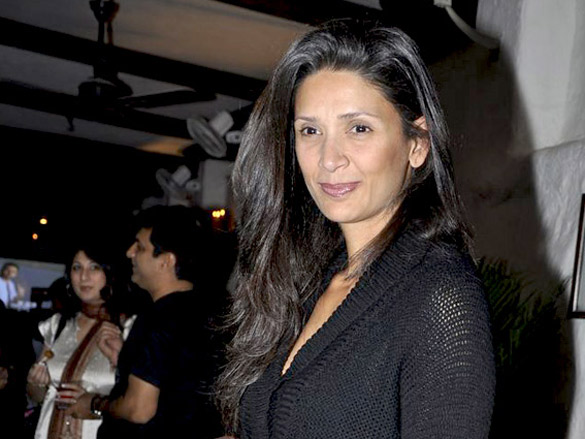
Mehr Jesia Rampal,
Femina Miss India Universe 1986

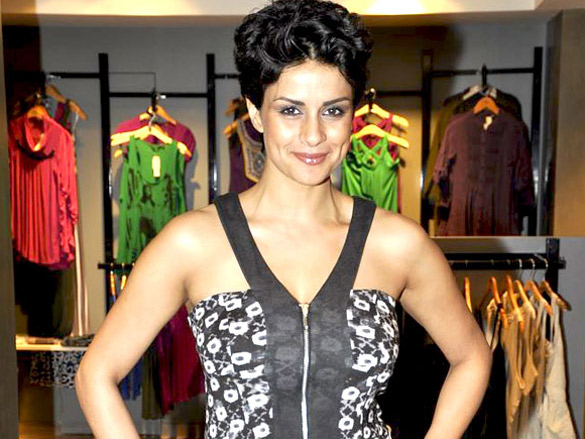
Gul Panag,
Femina Miss India 1999

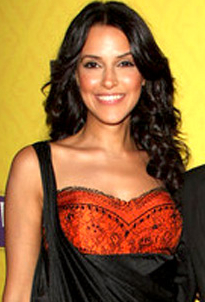
Neha Dhupia,
Femina Miss India Universe 2002

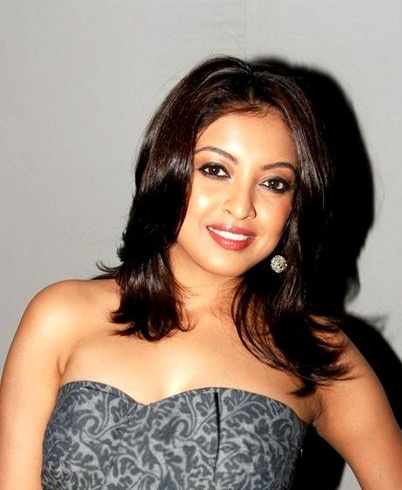
Tanushree Dutta,
Femina Miss India Universe 2004

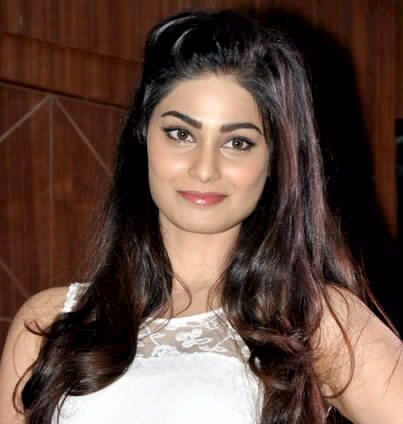
Puja Gupta,
Femina Miss India Universe 2007

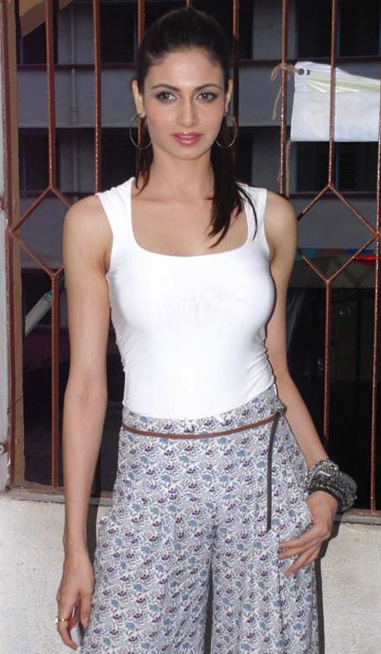
Simran Kaur Mundi,
Femina Miss India Universe 2008

=== Femina Miss India World ===
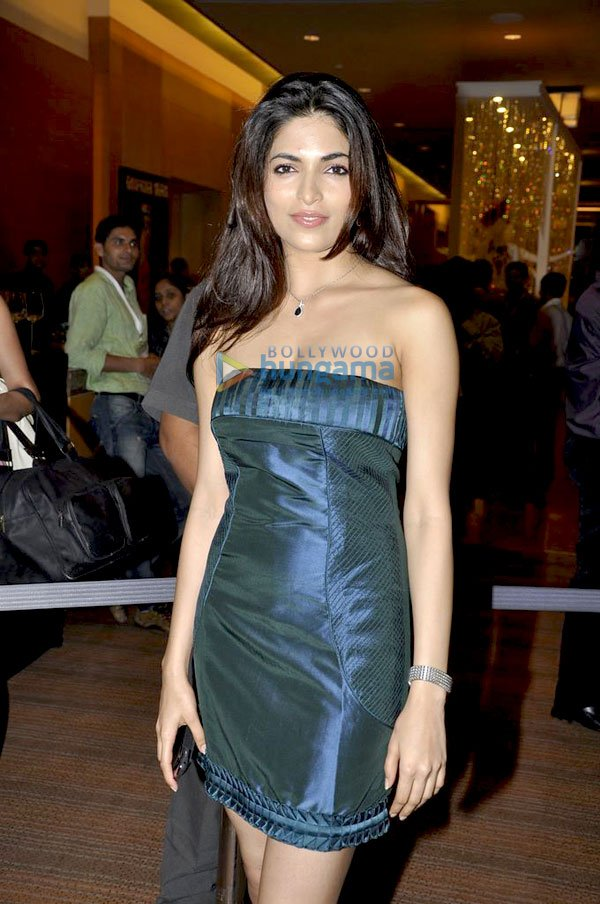
Parvathy Omanakuttan,
Miss World 2008 - 1st Runner-up

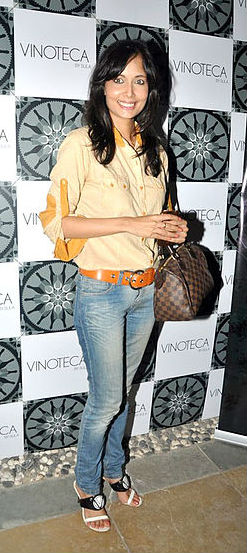
Shruti Sharma,
Femina Miss India World 2002

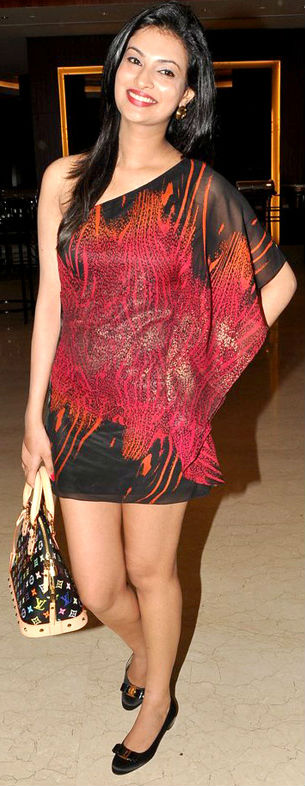
Sayali Bhagat,
Femina Miss India World 2004

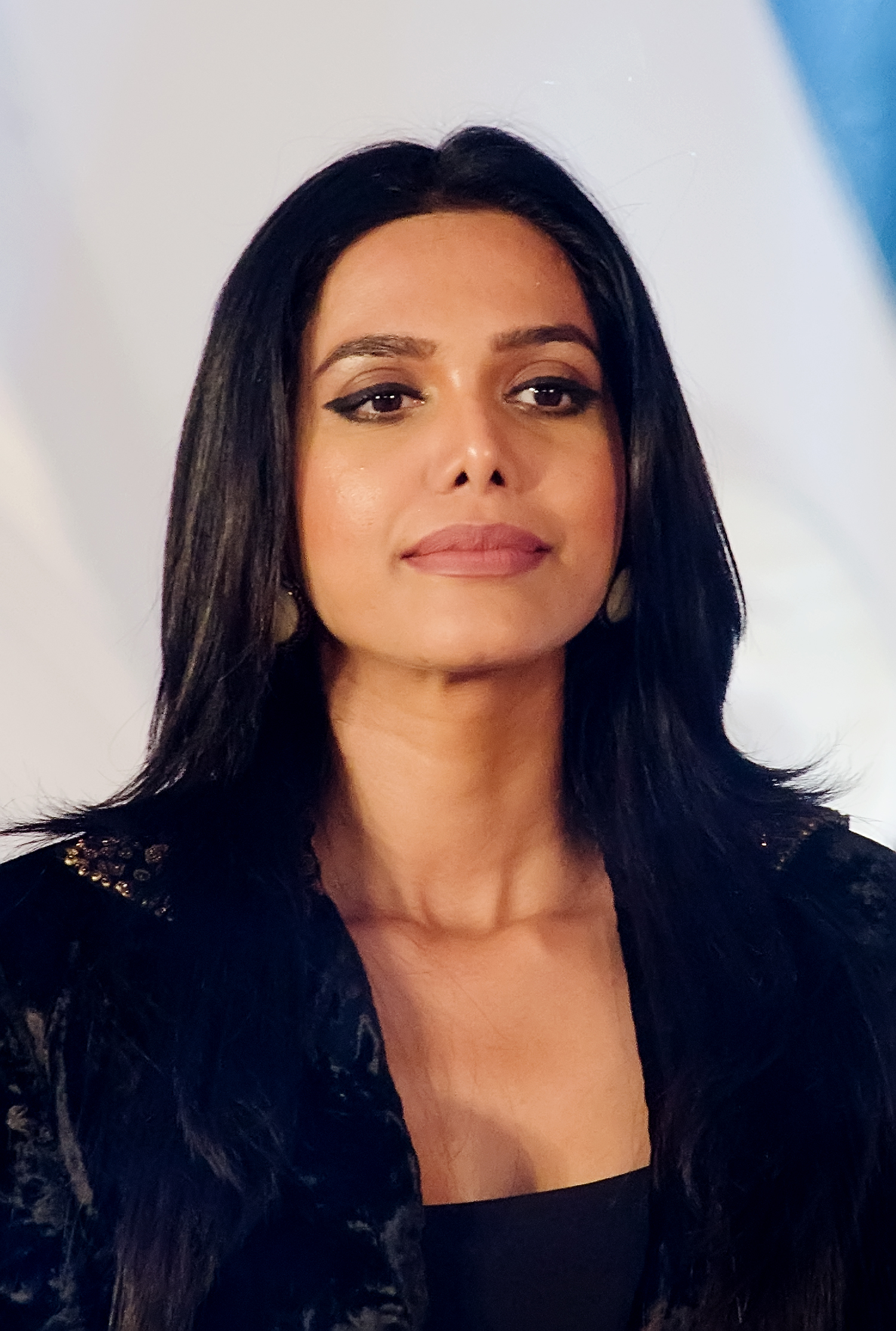
Natasha Suri,
Femina Miss India World 2006

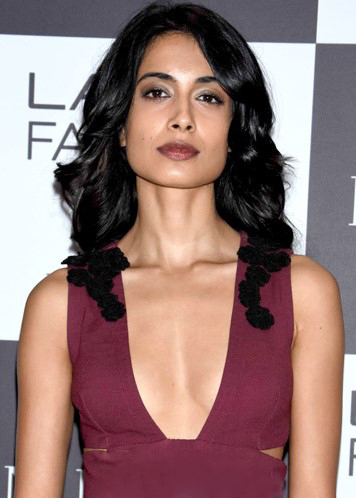
Sarah-Jane Dias,
Femina Miss India world 2007

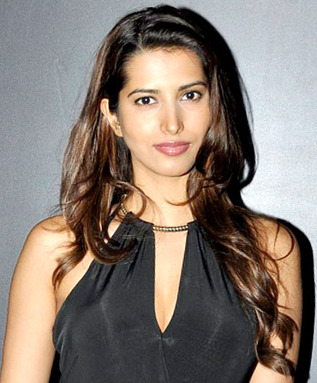
Manasvi Mamgai,
Femina Miss India world 2010,
Miss Tourism International 2008

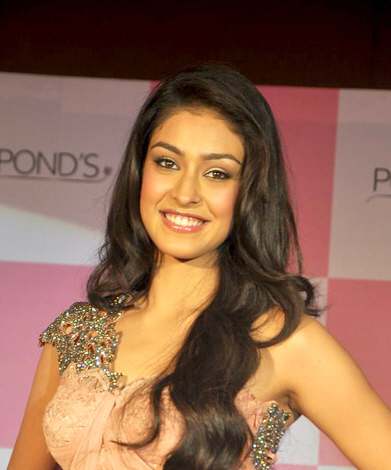
Navneet Kaur Dhillon,
Femina Miss India World 2013

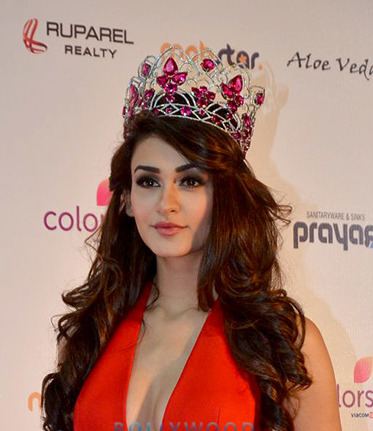
Aditi Arya,
Femina Miss India World 2015

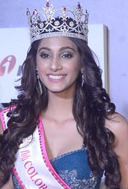
Anukreethy Vas,
Femina Miss India World 2018

=== Femina Miss India Earth ===
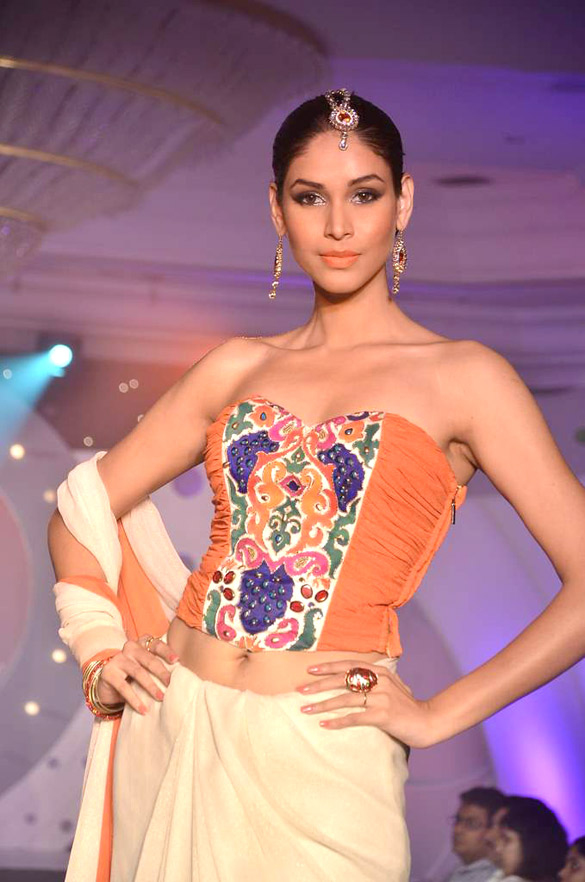
Amruta Patki,
Miss Earth Air 2006

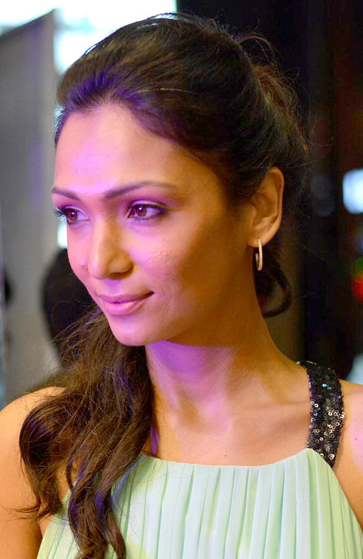
Shamita Singha,
Femina Miss India Earth 2001

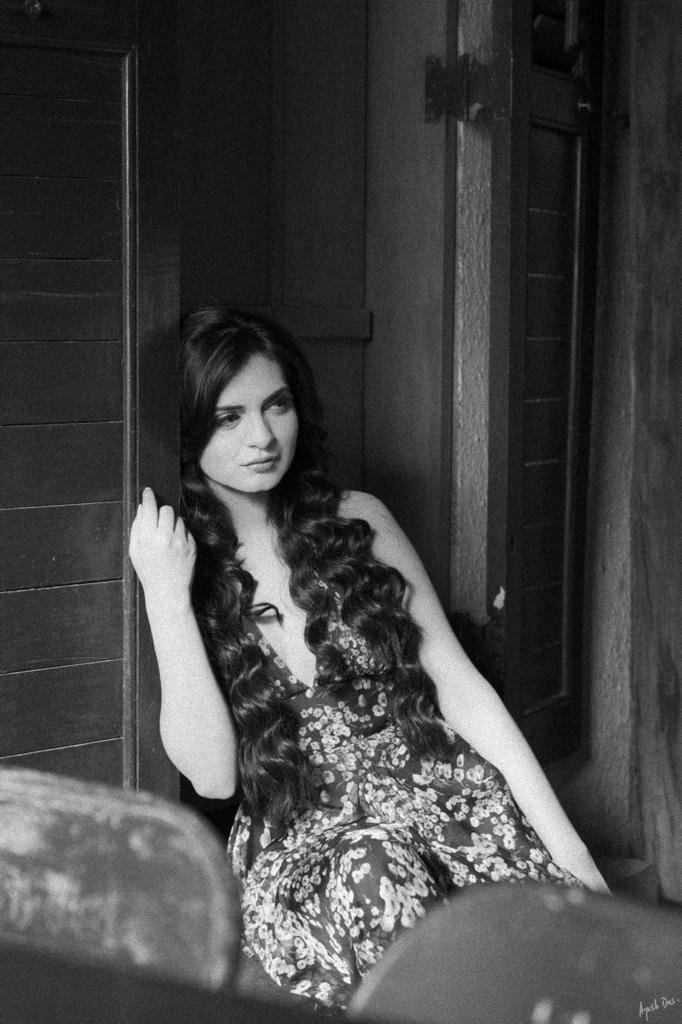
Niharika Singh,
Femina Miss India Earth 2005

=== Femina Miss India International ===
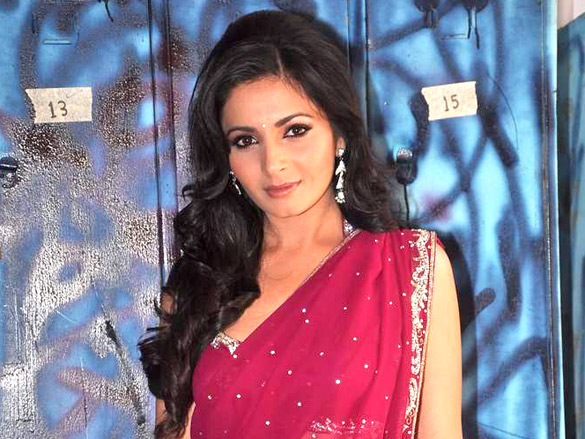
Shonali Nagrani,
Miss International 2003 - 1st Runner-up

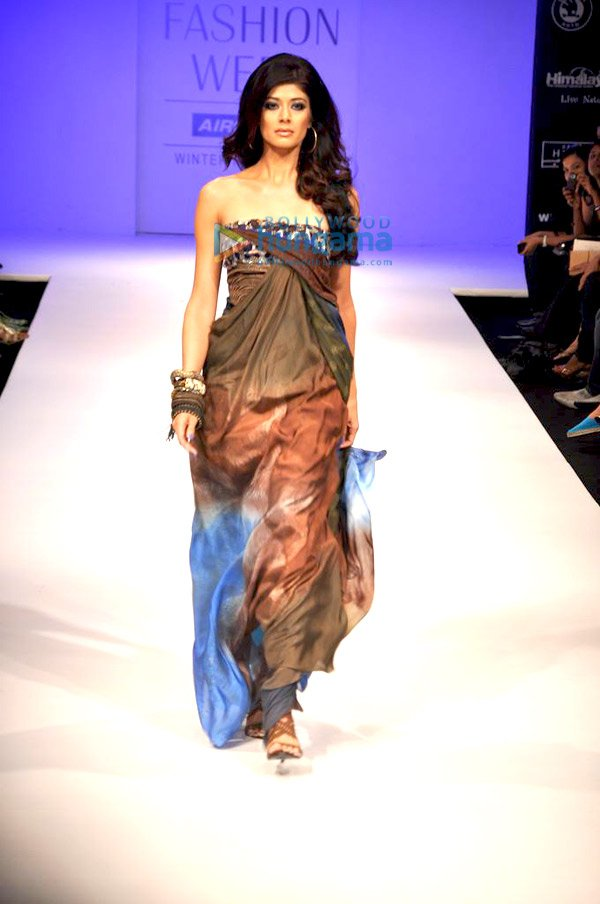
Pooja Batra,
Femina Miss India International 1993

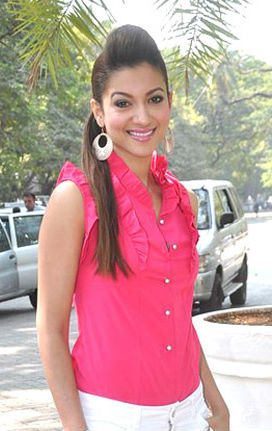
Gauahar Khan,
Femina Miss India International 2002

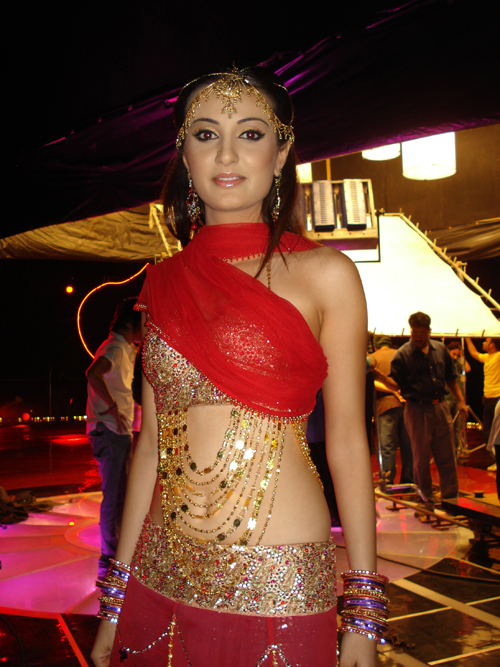
Vaishali Desai,
Femina Miss India International 2005

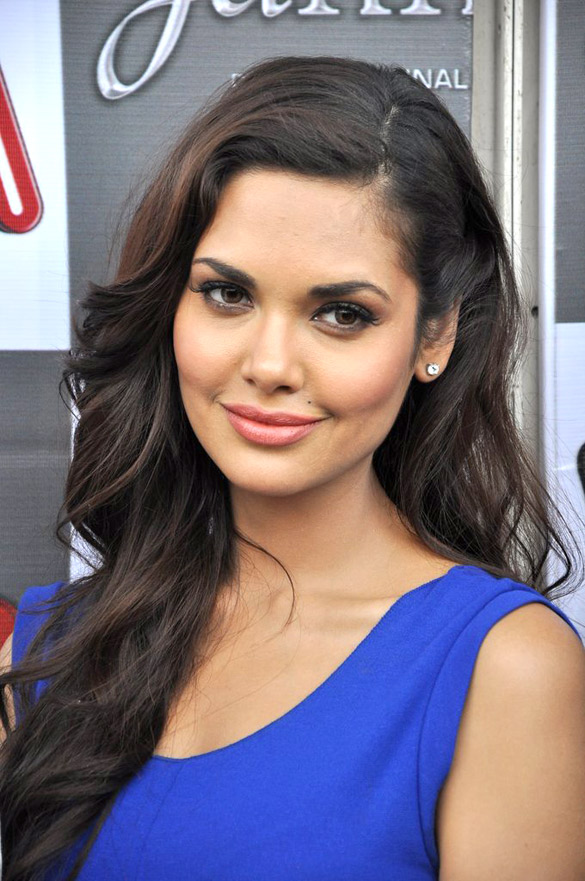
Esha Gupta,
Femina Miss India International 2007

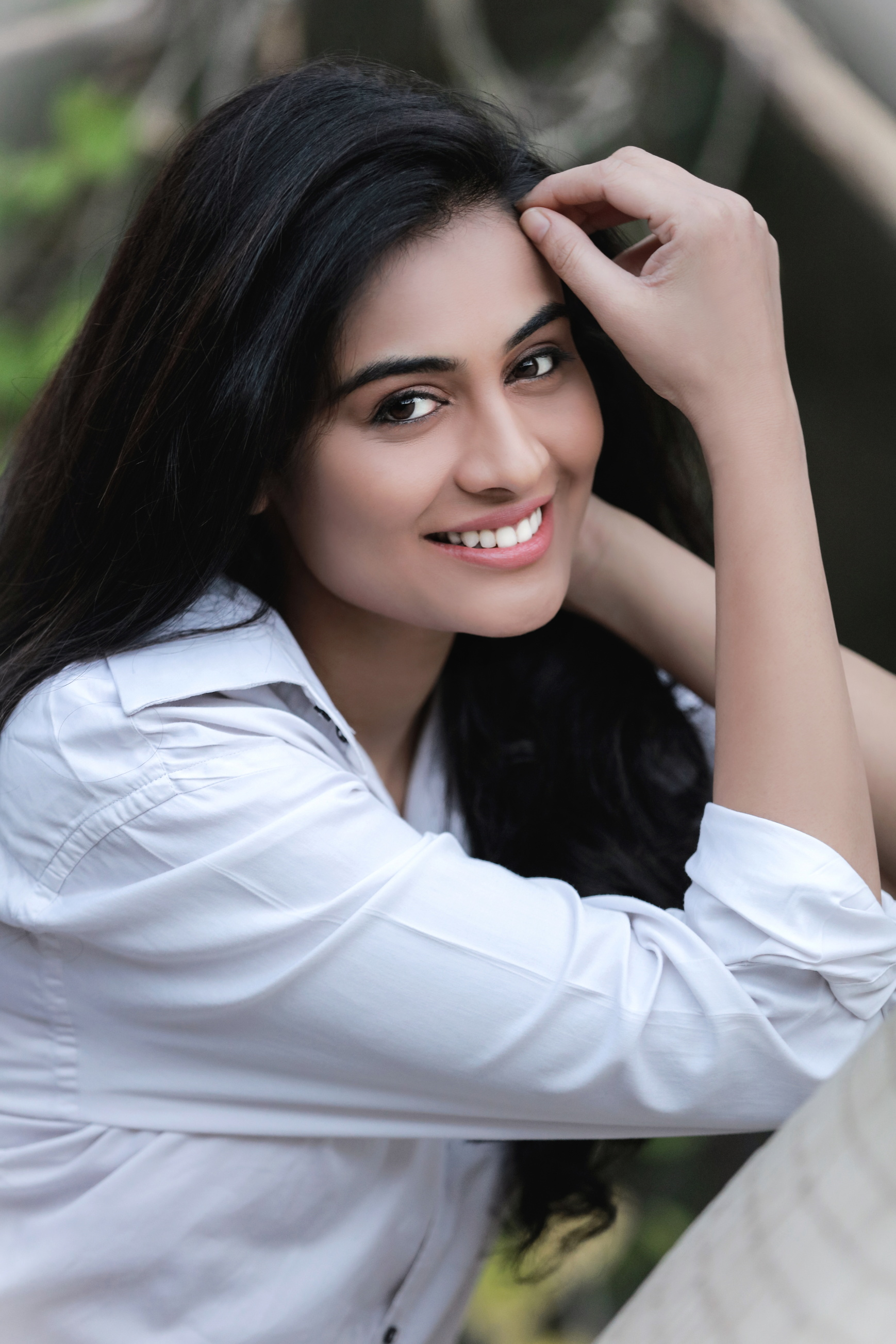
Neha Hinge,
Femina Miss India International 2010

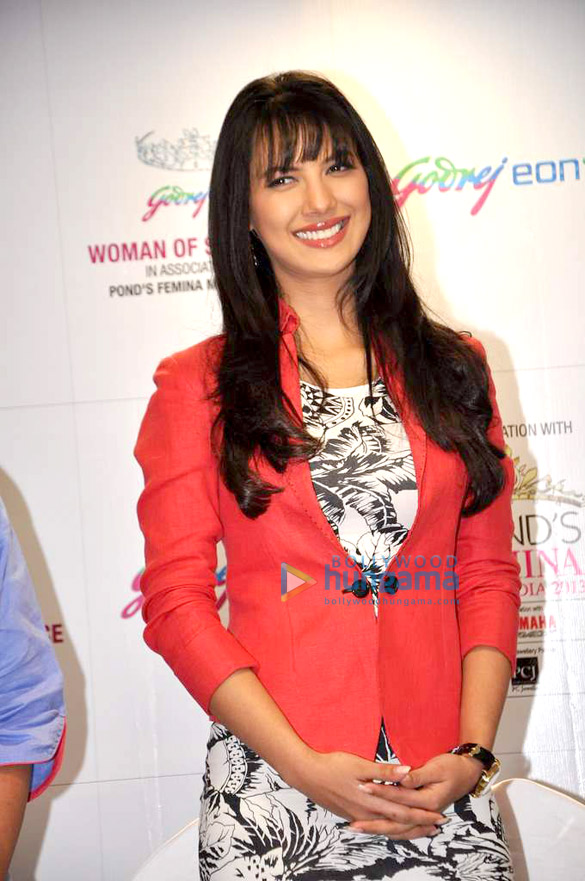
Rochelle Rao,
Femina Miss India International 2012

=== Femina Miss Grand India ===
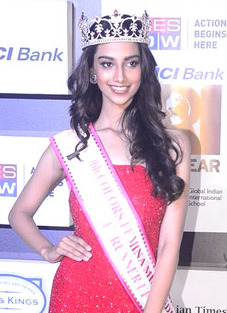
Meenakshi Chaudhary,
Miss Grand International 2018 - 1st Runner-up

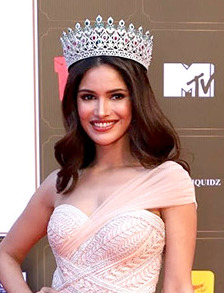
Vartika Singh,
Miss Grand International 2015 - 2nd Runner-up

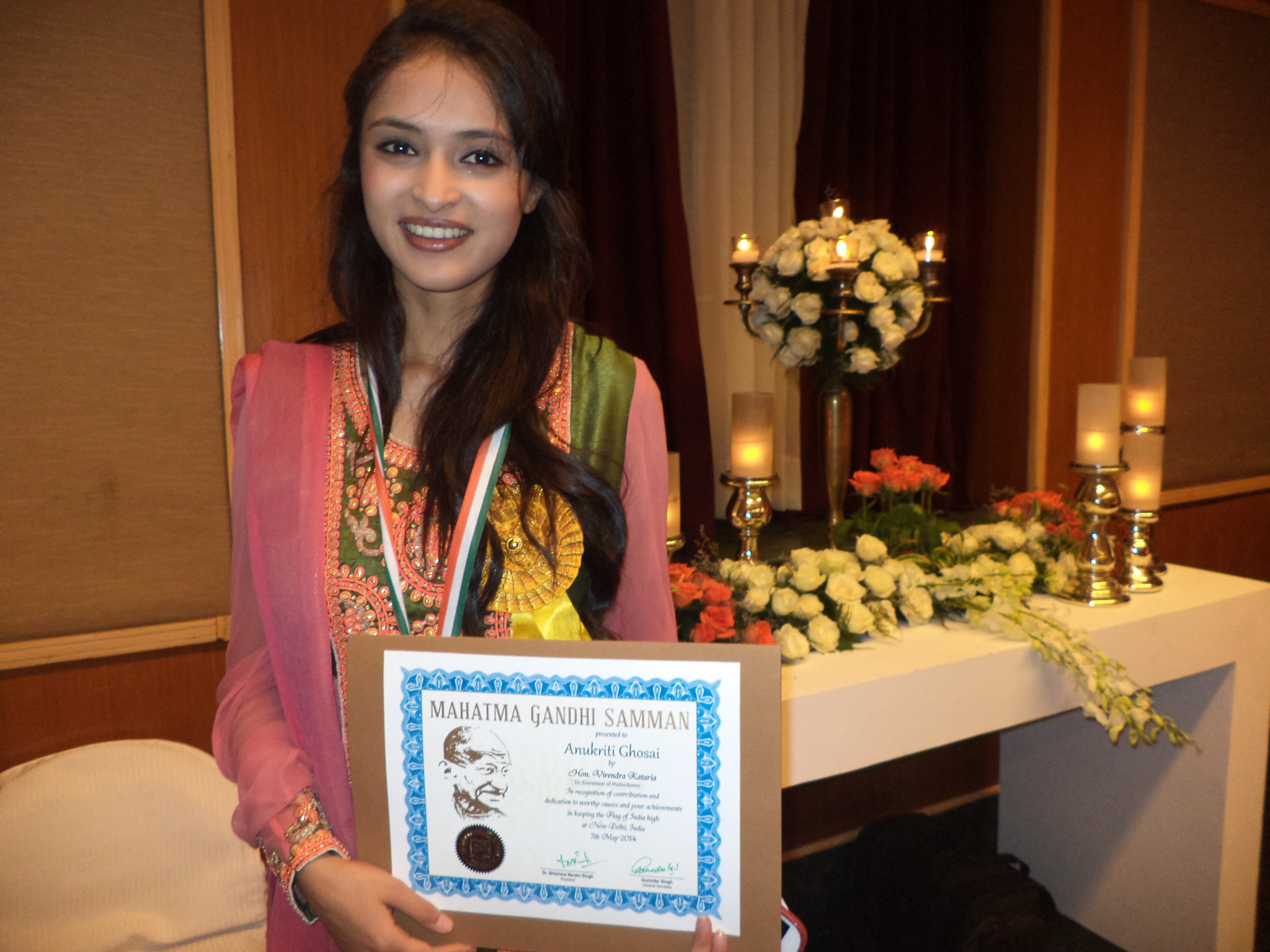
Anukriti Gusain,
Miss Grand India 2017

=== Femina Miss India Asia Pacific ===
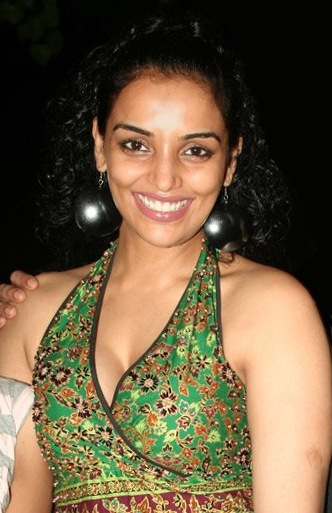
Shweta Menon,
Femina Miss India Asia Pacific 1994

=== Mister India ===
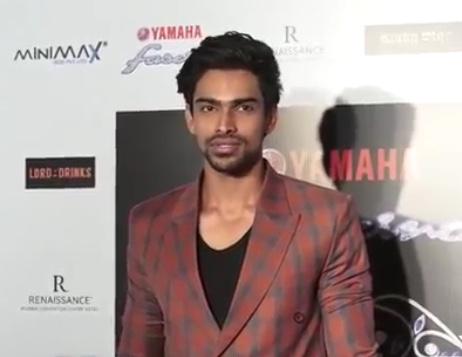
Vishnu Raj Menon,
Mister India World 2017

== See also ==
- List of Indian representatives at international male beauty pageants
- Miss Universe India
- Miss Diva
- Miss Transqueen India
- Miss India Worldwide India
- List of beauty pageants
