= Pamella Bordes =

Indian photographer and model

Pamela Bordes
- Born: Pamela Chaudry Singh; 1961 (age 64–65); New Delhi, India
- Occupation: Photographer
- Known for: Miss India

Pamela Singh (born 1961), known for some years as Pamella Bordes, is an Indian photographer and beauty pageant titleholder who won Miss India 1982.

== Personal life ==
Singh was born in New Delhi in 1961; her father, Major Mahinder Singh, was an officer in the Indian Army. She attended the Maharani Gayatri Devi Girls' Public School in Jaipur then transferred to the Lady Shri Ram College in Delhi to study literature. She won the Miss India crown in 1982 and represented India in the Miss Universe pageant the same year. She subsequently moved to Europe, where she met and married Henri Bordes.

Singh studied at Parsons School of Design in New York, the American University of Paris, and the International Center of Photography in New York. She took to photography as her career in 1997.

== Allegations ==
In the late 1980s Singh worked in a brothel which had provided one of British publicist Max Clifford's clients with various services. Clifford asked the madam to reveal details of her girls and clients, and found that one girl, Bordes, was simultaneously dating Andrew Neil, editor of The Sunday Times, Donald Trelford, editor of The Observer, Conservative minister Colin Moynihan, and billionaire arms dealer Adnan Khashoggi. Clifford rang News of the World editor Patsy Chapman and drip-fed her the story of Bordes through the investigative reporter she was using on the madam. The story was published in March 1989 under the headline "Call Girl Works in Commons", since it was discovered she had a House of Commons security pass arranged by MPs David Shaw and Henry Bellingham.

Clifford claimed Bordes was never his client, and that he earned his fee for "writing" the story, which saved the madam from some adverse publicity. The News of the World suggested Bordes was a call girl. The Sunday Telegraph accused Neil of knowing that and claimed he was unfit to edit a serious newspaper. Neil sued for libel and in January 1990 won the case and was awarded damages.

| Preceded by Ruchita Kumar | Miss India; 1982 | Succeeded by Rekha Hande |
