= Amrita Thapar =

Miss India 2005

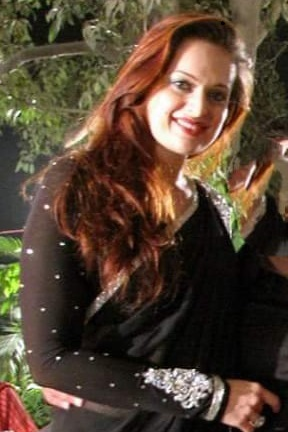
- 2023
- Born: June 12, 1984 (age 42); Pune, India
- Height: 5 ft 8.5 in (1.74 m)
- Beauty pageant titleholder
- Title: Miss India 2005
- Hair color: Brown
- Eye color: Green grey
- Major competitions: Miss India Universe 2005 (winner); Miss Universe 2005

Amrita Thapar is an Indian model and beauty pageant titleholder who won Femina Miss India Universe 2005 and then represented her country at Miss Universe 2005. She won the Femina Miss India Universe title in 2005 and in the same year at the Miss Universe beauty pageant held in Thailand, she represented India amongst 81 other countries.

== Personal life ==
Amrita was born in Pune, Maharashtra on 12 June 1984 in a Sikh family. She is a graduate from NIFT and presently works as a fashion designer. She is winner of May Queen 1999. 1st Runners Up at RSI club,99. 1st Runners Up at Poona club,99. She is a certified scuba diver and loves Kayaking. She also won two best designer awards at NIFT SOFT, where she studied fashion designing course.

== Career ==
Thapar is a fashion designer, a stylist, a painter, a fashion writer and orator. She has been the spokesperson of Berlin and Maurtius tourism. She has been bestowed upon the honor by the Mauritian Prime Minister to be their Goodwill Ambassador for life. She was also an active founding member of the Commonwealth games in India. She has served as Director and ambassador for her home venture called 'Cosmopolitan Institute of Style' based in Bangalore.

She has appeared in Pankaj Udhas's music album 'Jaaneman' and Punjabi music video "Kurri Patole Wargi" by Malkit Singh.

Preceded by Tanushree Dutta	Miss India Universe; 2005	Succeeded by Neha Kapur
