= Deepti Divakar =

Indian model

- Born: Bangalore, Karnataka; India
- Education: Parsons The New School for Design; New York City, United States; University of California, Los Angeles, United States; Bangalore University; India; San Francisco State University; United States
- Occupations: Model, actress, author
- Beauty pageant titleholder
- Title: Femina Miss India World 1981
- Hair color: Black
- Eye color: Black

Deepti Divakar (born 31 October 1958) is an Indian actress, author, model and beauty pageant titleholder who the winner of Miss India in 1981.

== Early life and career ==
Divakar was born in Bangalore. Her grandfather, Dr R.R. Diwakar, was India's first Information and Broadcasting minister and Governor of Bihar. She studied interior design at Parsons School of Design, New York and University of California, Los Angeles. She has a Bachelor of Architecture degree from Bangalore University and a Master of Arts degree in radio and television from San Francisco State University.

Divakar has performed the classical Indian dance bharatanatyam in India, Europe and the United States. The World Development Parliament of West Bengal awarded her a national award in this endeavor, "Bharatha Natyam Maharathnam".
