= Rekha Hande =

Indian charity worker and Miss India(1983)

Rekha Hande is an Indian charity worker and beauty pageant titleholder who was crowned Miss India 1983 and represented her country at Miss Universe 1983. She also won Miss Karnataka, Miss Bangalore and several other titles such as Spring Queen, Pond's Queen, May Queen etc. She was the Eve's Weekly First Runner-up.

With the gained popularity after winning the Miss India Pageant she pursued careers in modelling and the film industry. She worked in the beauty business and with charity organisations.

Preceded by Pamela Chaudry Singh	Miss India Universe; 1983	Succeeded by Juhi Chawla
