= Neha Kapur =

Indian model (born 1983)

- Born: 31 March 1983 (age 43); New Delhi, India
- Occupation: Model
- Height: 1.76 m (5 ft 9 in)
- Spouse: Kunal Nayyar (m. 2011)
- Beauty pageant titleholder
- Title: Femina Miss India Universe 2006
- Years active: 2006–present
- Major competitions: Femina Miss India Universe 2006 (Winner) (Miss Fresh Face) (Miss Photogenic); Miss Universe 2006 (Top 20)

Neha Kapur (born 31 March 1983) is an Indian model and beauty pageant titleholder who won Femina Miss India 2006 and represented India at the Miss Universe 2006 pageant.

== Early life ==
Kapur was born on 31 March 1983 in New Delhi, India into a Punjabi Hindu family. She learned classical dance forms when she was very young. She had four years of training in Bharatanatyam and eight years in Kathak. Kapur holds a degree in fashion design from the Pearl Academy. Her sister, Nina Kapur, was a newscaster.

She is married to The Big Bang Theory actor Kunal Nayyar.

== Career ==
In addition to winning the Femina Miss India Universe 2006 crown, Kapur also won the Femina Miss Fresh Face and Femina Miss Photogenic awards in the pageant.

Kapur represented India at the Miss Universe 2006 pageant held on 23 July in Los Angeles. She made the semifinals to the top 20.

Preceded by Amrita Thapar	Miss India Universe; 2006	Succeeded by Puja Gupta
