= Miss World 1959 =

9th Miss World pageant

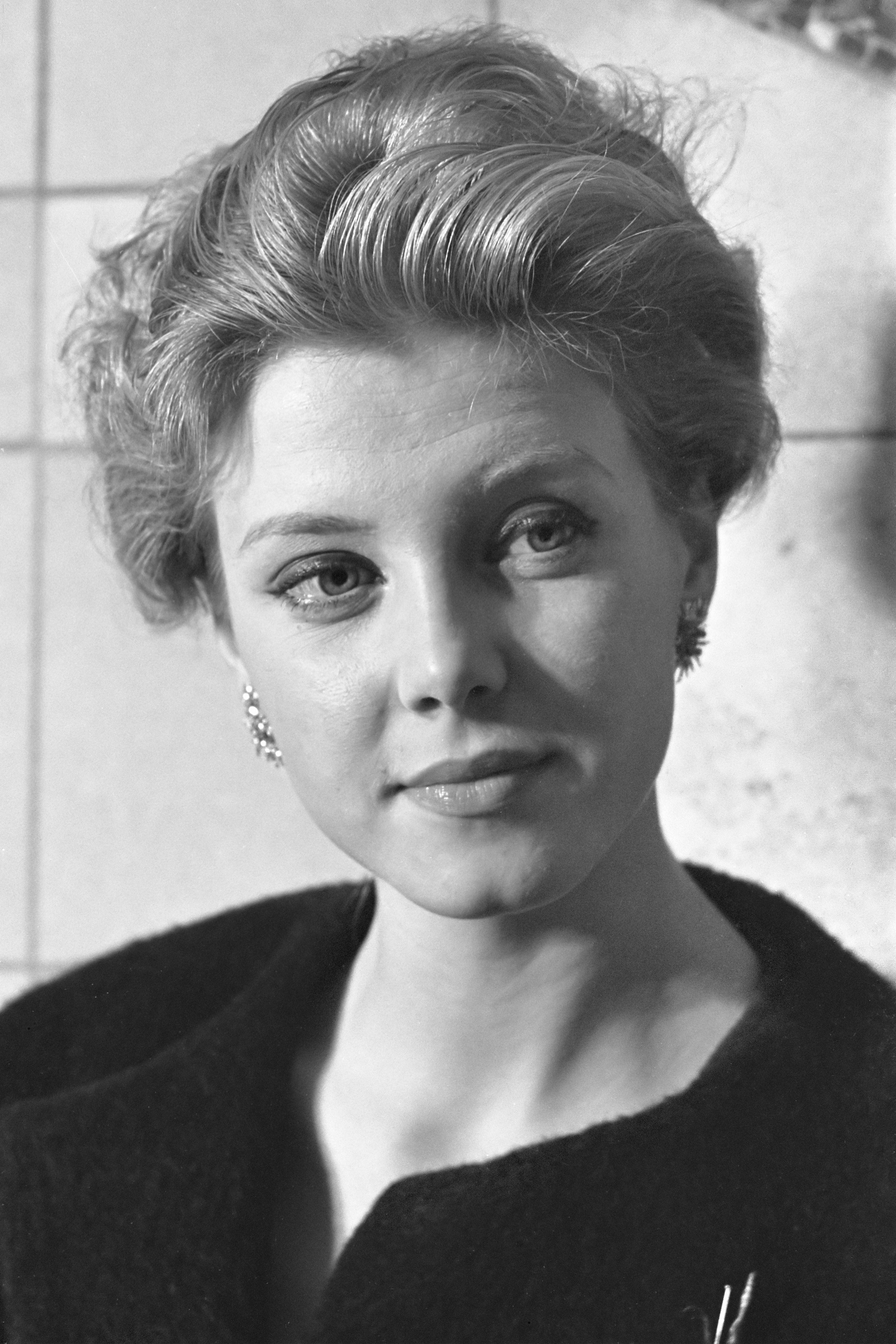
- Corine Rottschäfer
- Date: 10 November 1959
- Presenters: Bob Hope
- Venue: Lyceum Ballroom, London, United Kingdom
- Broadcaster: BBC
- Entrants: 37
- Placements: 11
- Debuts: Argentina; Ghana; Gibraltar; Hawaii; Hong Kong; India; Jamaica; Jordan; Paraguay; Peru; Portugal; Puerto Rico; Rhodesia and Nyasaland; South Korea; Uruguay
- Withdrawals: Morocco; Turkey; Venezuela
- Returns: Austria; Finland; Honduras; Iceland; Luxembourg
- Winner: Corine Rottschäfer; Holland

Miss World 1959 was the 9th edition of the Miss World pageant, held at the Lyceum Ballroom, London, United Kingdom, on 10 November 1959.

At the conclusion of the event, the Chief Barker of the Variety Club of Great Britain crowned Corine Rottschäfer of Holland as Miss World 1959. This is the first victory of Holland in the history of the pageant.

Contestants from thirty-seven countries and territories participated in this year's pageant. The pageant was hosted by Bob Hope.

== Background ==
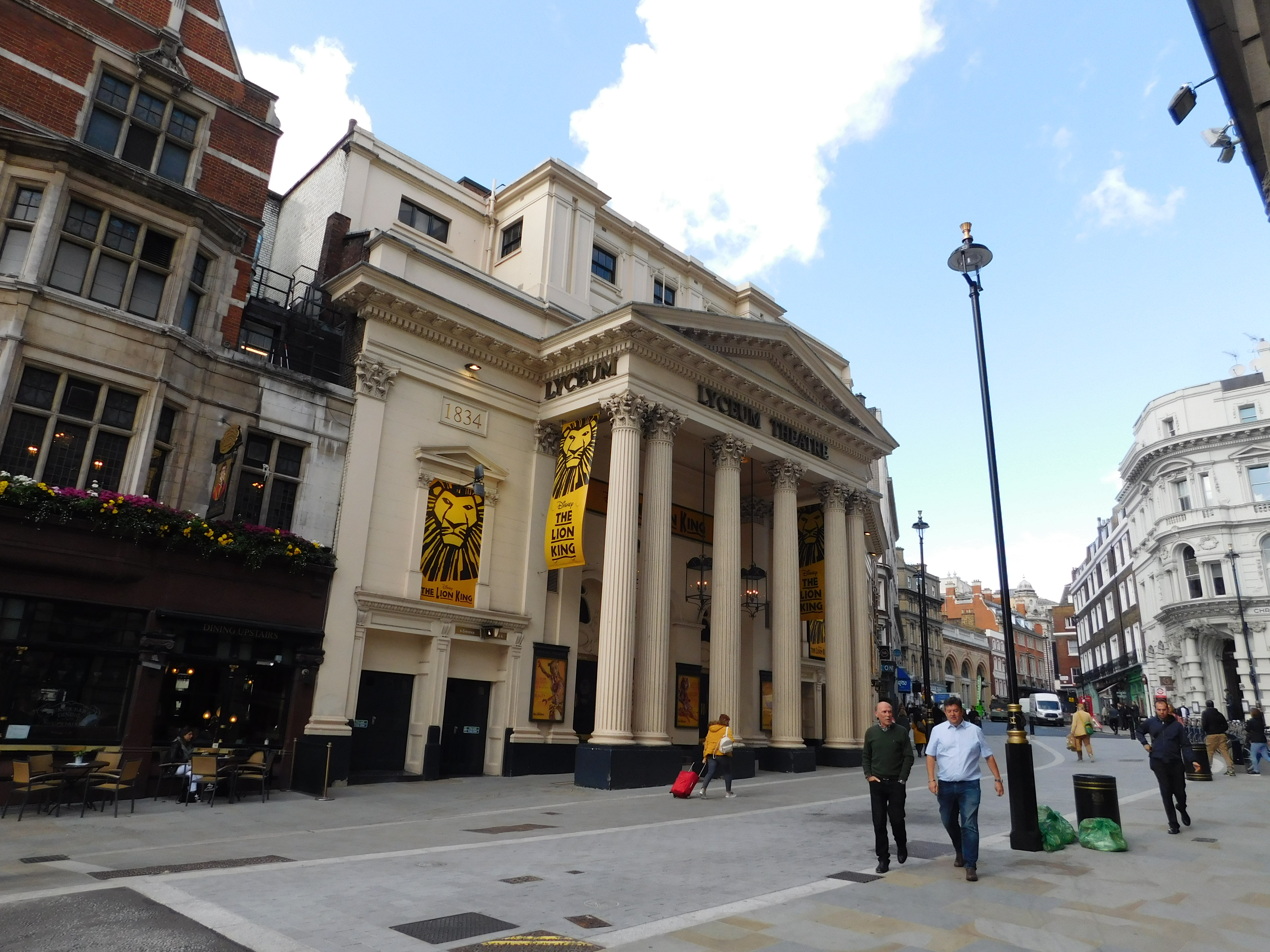
Lyceum Ballroom, venue of Miss World 1959

=== Selection of participants ===
Thirty-seven contestants were selected to compete in the pageant. Three contestants were appointed to represent their countries after being a runner-up in their national pageants.

==== Replacements ====
The first runner-up of Miss Maple Leaf 1959, Huguette Demers, was appointed to represent Canada after Miss Maple Leaf 1959, Irene Dobler relinquished her title in order to marry. Berit Grundvig, the first-runner of Miss Norway 1959, was appointed to represent her country after Miss Norway 1959, Jorunn Kristjansen, became the first runner-up of Miss Universe 1959. Miss Holland 1957, Corine Rottschäfer, was appointed to represent her country after Miss Holland 1959, Peggy Erwich, withdrew due to her modeling commitments.

==== Debuts, returns and withdrawals ====
This edition marked the debut of Argentina, Ghana, Gibraltar, Hawaii, Hong Kong, India, Jamaica, Jordan, Paraguay, Peru, Portugal, Puerto Rico, Rhodesia and Nyasaland, (Note: Competed as Southern Rhodesia and Nyasaland in the pageant) South Korea, (Note: Competed as Korea in the pageant) and Uruguay, and the return of Honduras, which last competed in 1955; and Austria, Finland, Iceland, and Luxembourg last competed in 1957.

Raymonde Valle of Morocco and Figen Özgür of Turkey withdrew for undisclosed reasons. Venezuela withdrew after its respective organization failed to hold a national competition or appoint a delegate. Habiba Bent Abdallah of Tunisia was supposed to compete, but withdrew from the competition due to financial constraints.

== Results ==
=== Placements ===
Placement	Contestant
Miss World 1959	Holland – Corine Rottschäfer
1st Runner-Up	Peru – María Elena Rossel
2nd Runner-Up	Israel – Ziva Shomrat
3rd Runner-Up	United Kingdom – Anne Thelwell
4th Runner-Up	Denmark – Kirsten Olsen
Top 11	Argentina – Amalia Yolanda Scuffi; Greece – Yakiathi Karaviti; Jamaica – Sheila Chong; Rhodesia and Nyasaland – Vivien Lentin; South Africa – Moya Meaker; West Germany – Helga Meyer

== Pageant ==
=== Format ===
The number of placements in this edition has been increased to eleven from six in the previous edition. The eleven semi-finalists were selected through a preliminary competition held on the day of the final competition consisting of a swimsuit and evening gown competition. The eleven semi-finalists were then interviewed by Bob Russell and paraded before the judges, and five finalists were eventually selected to compete in the final interview.

=== Selection committee ===
- Claude Berr – Co-head of the Miss Europe committee
- Reg Cudlipp – British newspaper editor for News of the World
- Taina Elg – Finnish-American actress and dancer
- Jill Ireland – British actress
- Lady Lydford – British socialite
- Cynthia Oberholzer – South African model
- Oscar Santa María – Brazilian politician
- John Spencer-Churchill – 11th Duke of Marlborough
- Godfrey Winn – English journalist

== Contestants ==
Thirty-seven contestants competed for the title.

Country	Contestant	Age (Note: Age at the time of the pageant)	Hometown
Argentina	Amalia Yolanda Scuffi	17	Mar de Plata
Austria	Helga Knofel	20	Vienna
Belgium	Diane Hidalgo	19	Brussels
Brazil	Dione Brito Oliveira	18	Caruaru
Canada	Huguette Demers	21	Montreal
Denmark	Kirsten Olsen	20	Frederiksberg
Finland	Margit Jaatinen	19	Helsinki
France	Marie Hélène Trové	19	Paris
Ghana	Star Nyaniba Annan	20	Accra
Gibraltar	Viola Howells	23	Gibraltar
Greece	Yakiathi Karaviti	20	Athens
Hawaii	Margaret Moani Keala Brumaghim	26	Honolulu
Holland	Corine Rottschäfer	21	Amsterdam
Honduras	Rosemary Lefebre	–	Tegucigalpa
Hong Kong	Michelle Mok	17	Hong Kong
Iceland	Sigurbjörg Sveinsdóttir	18	Reykjavík
India	Fleur Ezekiel	18	Mumbai
Ireland	Ann Fitzpatrick	17	Dublin
Israel	Ziva Shomrat	18	Haifa
Italy	Paola Falchi	18	Latium
Jamaica	Sheila Chong	24	Kingston
Japan	Chieko Ichinose	18	Tokyo
Jordan	Ufemia Jabaji	17	Amman
Luxembourg	Josee Pundel	20	Luxembourg City
Norway	Berit Grundvig	19	Oslo
Paraguay	Elvira dos Santos	18	Asunción
Peru	María Elena Rossel	17	Piura
Portugal	Maria Teresa Motoa Cardoso	18	Lisbon
Puerto Rico	Lyllianna Díaz	19	San Juan
Rhodesia and Nyasaland	Vivien Lentin	17	Kitwe
South Africa	Moya Meaker	18	Pretoria
South Korea	Seo Jung-ae	19	Busan
Sweden	Carola Håkonsson	20	Stockholm
United Kingdom	Anne Thelwell	22	Heswall
United States	Loretta Powell	24	Stratford
Uruguay	Yvonne Kelly	25	Montevideo
West Germany	Helga Meyer	23	Bielefeld
