= Fleur Ezekiel =

Indian model

- Born: Fleur Ezekiel
- Occupation: Model
- Height: 1.73 m (5 ft 8 in)
- Beauty pageant titleholder
- Title: Eve's Weekly Miss India 1959
- Years active: 1950s-1970s
- Major competitions: Eve's Weekly Miss India 1959 (Winner); Miss World 1959 (Unplaced)

Fleur Ezekiel is an Indian model and beauty pageant titleholder who was crowned Eve's Weekly Miss India 1959 and represented India at Miss World 1959. She was the first winner of Eve's Weekly Miss India pageant. She was Indian of Jewish ancestry, descending from a Bene Israel family. She has one younger brother, Noel Ezekiel. She was an Indian pioneer who brought India into the spotlight after becoming the first Indian to participate in Miss World.

Preceded by First Winner	Eve's Weekly Miss India; 1959	Succeeded by Iona Pinto
