= Miss India International =

Indian representative in beauty pageant

Miss International India
- Formation: 1960
- Type: Beauty pageant
- Headquarters: New Delhi
- Location: India
- Members: Miss International
- Official language: Hindi, English
- Key people: Nikhil Anand (National Director)
- Website: www.glamanand.com

Miss India International currently known as Miss International India is a title given to the Indian woman who represents India in the Miss International, an annual beauty pageant held in Japan. Miss Universe India pageant currently chooses the Indian representative for Miss International.

== History ==
=== 1960–1988: Eve's Weekly ===
India's participation in the Miss International pageant began in 1960 when Eve's Weekly magazine selected Iona Pinto as the country's first delegate. Pinto was crowned at the Eve's Weekly Miss India contest and went on to place as 1st runner-up at the inaugural Miss International pageant held in Long Beach, California. Eve's Weekly continued to send India's representatives to Miss International until 1988. The magazine ceased publication in 1989, resulting in no Indian representation in 1989 and 1990.

=== 1991–2014: The Times Group ===
From 1991, Femina Miss India, organized by The Times Group, held the franchise for Miss International. During this period, India achieved several high placements, including two first runners-up and one second runner-up. Shonali Nagrani placed as 1st runner-up in 2003, marking the country's highest placement under this organization. The last representative from Femina Miss India was Jhataleka Malhotra in 2014. The Times Group lost the franchise in 2015.

=== 2015, 2017–2022: Glamanand Group ===
In 2015, the Miss International India franchise was acquired by the Glamanand Group, led by Nikhil Anand. The first edition of the Glamanand Miss International India pageant was held in November 2015, with Supriya Aiman crowned as the winner. Glamanand sent representatives in 2015 and from 2017 to 2022.

=== 2016: Perk Events Group ===
In 2016, the franchise was briefly held by Perk Events Group, which selected Rewati Chetri from Assam as Miss International India.

=== 2023–2024: Divine Group ===
The franchise was transferred to the Divine Group in 2023. Deepak Agarwal, founder and CEO, served as National Director. The organization sent representatives for the 2023 and 2024 editions of Miss International.

=== 2025–present: Glamanand Group ===
In 2025, the Glamanand Group reacquired the Miss International India franchise.

== Titleholders ==
Year	Titleholder	Title	Home	Venue
2025	Roosh Sindhu	Miss International India 2025	Maharashtra	Zee Studios, Jaipur
2024	Rashmi Shinde	Divine Miss International India 2024	Maharashtra	Golden Tulip Suites, Gurgaon
2023	Praveena Anjana	Divine Miss International India 2023	Rajasthan	Jawaharlal Nehru Auditorium, New Delhi
2022	Zoya Afroz	GSI Miss International India 2021	Uttar Pradesh	Kingdom of Dreams, Gurugram
2019	Simrithi Bathija	GSI Miss International India 2019	Maharashtra	Jai Bagh Palace, Jaipur
2018	Tanishqa Bhosale	GSI Miss International India 2018	Maharashtra	Kingdom of Dreams, Gurugram

== Miss International representatives ==
Color key

- : Declared as Winner
- : Ended as Runner-up
- : Ended as one of the Finalists or Semi-finalists
- : Ended as special awards winner

Year	Delegate	State	Placement	Special Awards
2026	Vaishnavi Ganesh	Tamil Nadu	TBA	
2025	Roosh Sindhu	Maharashtra	Top 20	Best in Preliminary Evening Gown; Best in Preliminary Swimsuit (Top 8)
2024	Rashmi Shinde	Maharashtra	Unplaced	
2023	Praveena Aanjna	Rajasthan	Unplaced	Best National Costume- (Top 8)
2023	Kashish Methwani	Maharashtra	Could not represent due to change in franchise	
2022	Zoya Afroz	Uttar Pradesh	Unplaced	
2019	Simrithi Bathija	Maharashtra	Unplaced	
2018	Tanishqa Bhosale	Maharashtra	Unplaced	
2017	Ankita Kumari	Bihar	Unplaced	
2016	Rewati Chetri	Assam	Unplaced	
2015	Ayeesha Aiman	Bihar	Unplaced	
2014	Jhataleka Malhotra	Maharashtra	Unplaced	Miss Internet; 3rd Runner Up – Best National Costume
2013	Gurleen Grewal	Punjab	Unplaced	1st Runner Up – Miss Internet
2012	Rochelle Rao	Tamil Nadu	Top 15	
2011	Ankita Shorey	Punjab	Unplaced	
2010	Neha Hinge	Madhya Pradesh	Top 15	
2009	Harshita Saxena	Goa	Unplaced	
2008	Radha Brahmbhatt	Gujarat	Unplaced	
2007	Esha Gupta	New Delhi	Unplaced	
2006	Sonnalli Seygall	West Bengal	Top 12	
2005	Vaishali Desai	Gujarat	Unplaced	
2004	Mihika Verma	Maharashtra	Top 15	
2003	Shonali Nagrani	New Delhi	1st Runner-Up	
2002	Gauahar Khan	Maharashtra	Unplaced	
2001	Kanwal Toor	New Delhi	Top 15	
2000	Gayatri Joshi	Maharashtra	Top 15	
1999	Srikrupa Murali	Karnataka	Unplaced	
1998	Shwetha Jaishanker	Tamil Nadu	2nd Runner-Up	
1997	Diya Abraham	Kerala	1st Runner-Up	
1996	Fleur Dominique Xavier	Maharashtra	Unplaced	
1995	Priya Gill	Punjab	Unplaced	
1994	Francesca Hart	Maharashtra	Unplaced	
1993	Pooja Batra	Punjab	Top 15	
1992	Komal Sandhu	New Delhi	Unplaced	
1991	Preeti Mankotia	Karnataka	Top 15	
1988	Shikha Swaroop	Maharashtra	Unplaced	
1987	Erica Maria De Sousa	Maharashtra	Top 15	
1986	Poonam Gidwani	Maharashtra	Unplaced	
1985	Vinita Seshadri Vasan	Karnataka	Unplaced	
1984	Nalanda Ravindra Bhandar	West Bengal	Top 15	
1983	Sahila Chadha	Punjab	Unplaced	
1982	Betty O'Connor	Maharashtra	Unplaced	
1981	Shashikala Seshadri	Tamil Nadu	Unplaced	
1980	Ulrike Karen Bredemeyer	Maharashtra	Top 15	
1979	Neeta Painter	Maharashtra	Top 15	
1978	Sabita Dhanrajgir	Punjab	Unplaced	
1977	Joan Stephens	Rajasthan	Unplaced	
1976	Nafisa Ali	Maharashtra	2nd Runner-up	
1975	Indira Maria Bredemeyer	Maharashtra	2nd Runner-Up	
1974	Leslie Jean Hartnett	New Delhi	Unplaced	
1973	Lynette Williams	Karnataka	Unplaced	
1972	Indira Muthanna	Karnataka	Unplaced	2nd Runner Up – Best National Costume
1971	Samita Mukherjee	West Bengal	Unplaced	
1970	Patricia D'Souza	New Delhi	Top 15	
1969	Wendy Leslie Vaz	Maharashtra	Unplaced	
1968	Sumita Sen	West Bengal	Top 15	
1962	Sheila Chonkar	Maharashtra	Unplaced	
1961	Diana Valentine	New Delhi	Unplaced	
1960	Iona Pinto	Maharashtra	1st Runner-Up	

== Titleholder gallery ==
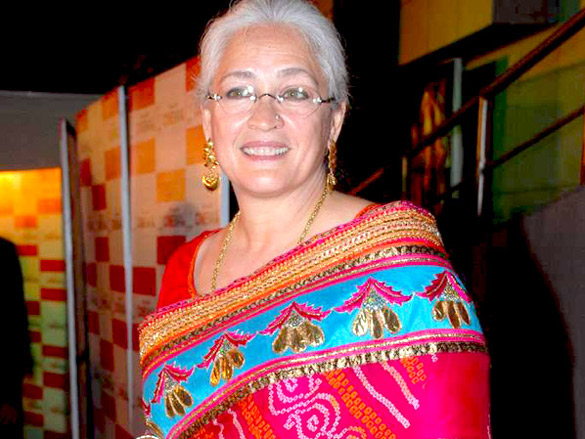
Nafisa Ali,
Miss International 1976 - 2nd Runner-up

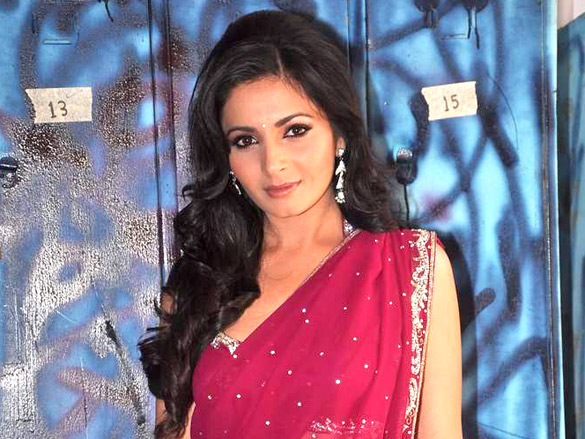
Shonali Nagrani,
Miss International 2003 - 1st Runner-up

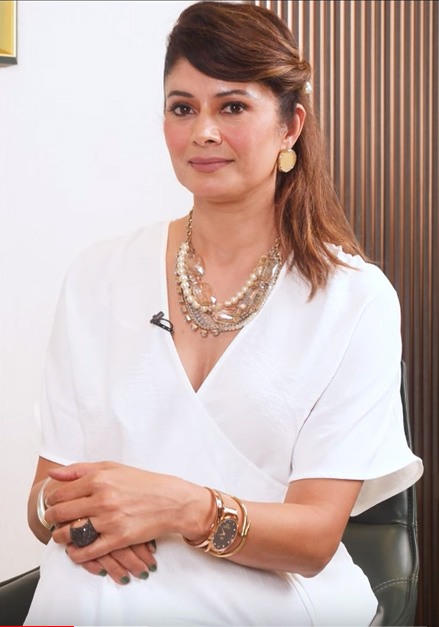
Pooja Batra,
Femina Miss India International 1993

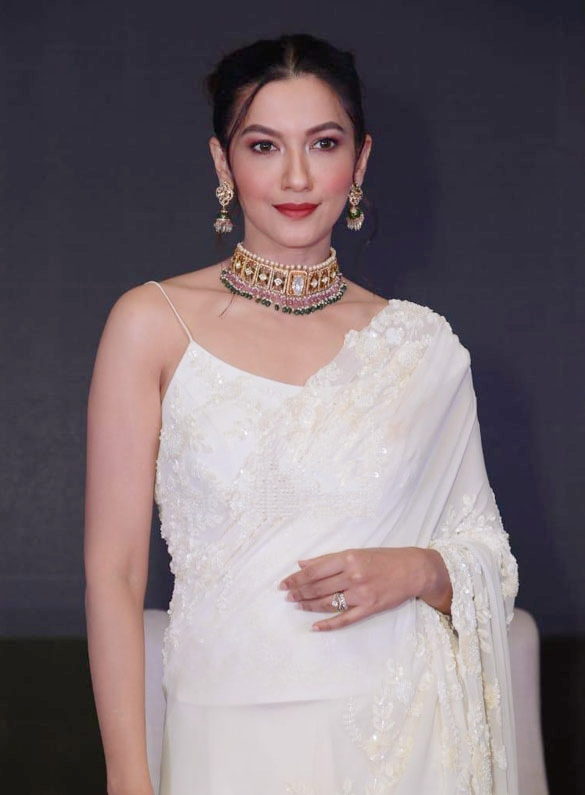
Gauahar Khan,
Femina Miss India International 2002

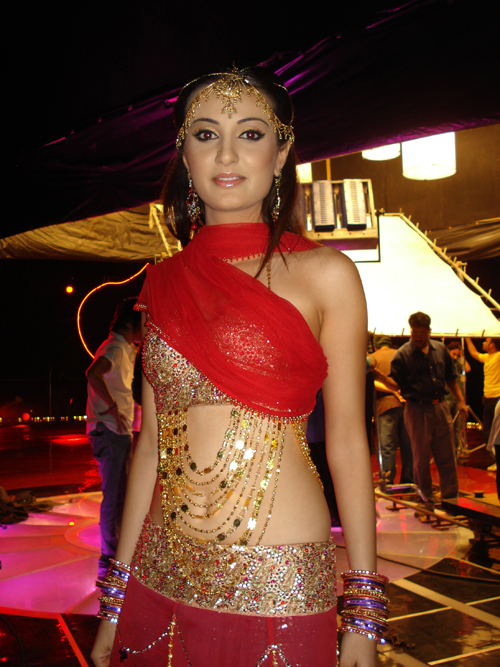
Vaishali Desai,
Femina Miss India International 2005

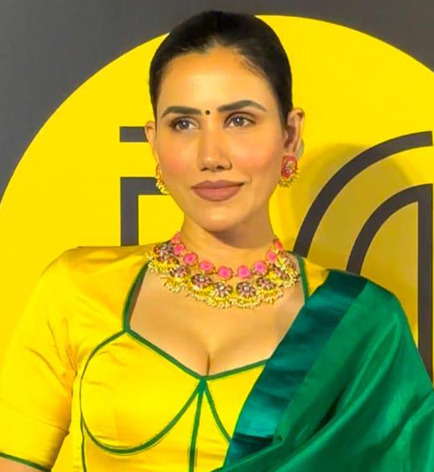
Sonnalli Seygall,
Femina Miss India International 2006

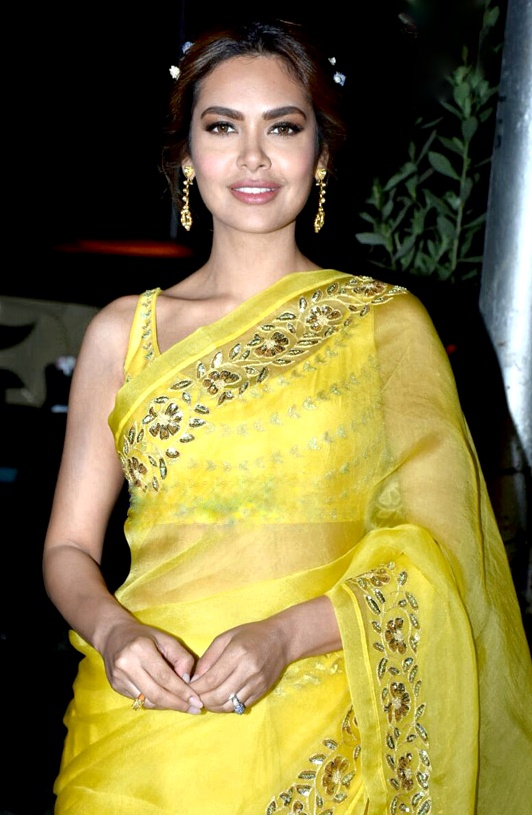
Esha Gupta,
Femina Miss India International 2007

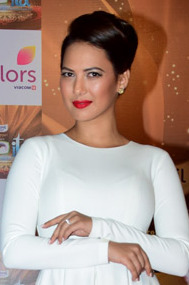
Rochelle Rao,
Femina Miss India International 2012

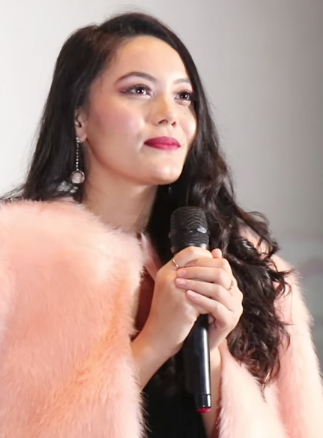
Rewati Chetri,
Senorita Miss India International 2016

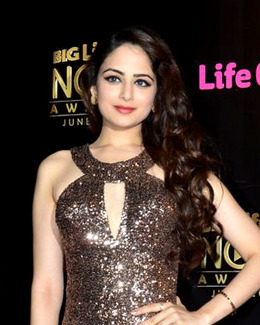
Zoya Afroz,
GSI Miss India International 2022

== See also ==
- Femina Miss India
- Miss Universe India
- Miss Divine Beauty
- Miss Diva
