= Paloma Rao =

Indian actress, video jockey and radio jockey (born 1986)

- Born: 4 February 1986 (age 40); Chennai, India
- Other names: SS Paloma; VJ Paloma
- Occupations: Actress; video jockey; radio jockey
- Relatives: Rochelle Rao (sister); Keith Sequeira (brother-in-law)

Paloma Rao (born 4 February 1986), is an Indian music VJ, RJ and actress.

== Career ==
A graduate of B.Sc. Visual Communication from Loyola College, Chennai, Paloma began her career as a theatre artist. In 2004 she became a VJ on SS Music, and hosted the popular shows First Frame, Autograph and Just Connect. She played a cameo role in Unnale Unnale, which became a hit at the box-office. She now hosts the Live Cafe on Radio Station Chennai Live 104.8 FM. She now hosts shows for Star Sports. In 2016 Paloma anchored the Tamil Nadu Premier League and in 2017 the ICC Champions Trophy.

== Filmography ==
| Year | Film | Role | Language | Notes |
|---|---|---|---|---|
| 2007 | That Four-Letter Word | Sara | English | |
| 2007 | Unnale Unnale | Priya | Tamil | |
