= Harshita Saxena =

- Born: Goa, India
- Beauty pageant titleholder
- Title: Femina Miss India International 2009
- Major competitions: Femina Miss India 2008 (Winner-Miss India Earth) (Dethroned); Femina Miss India 2009 (Top 5); Miss International 2009 (Unplaced); Miss Universe India 2010 (Top 20)

Harshita Saxena is an Indian model and beauty pageant titleholder who was the winner of Femina Miss India International 2009 title, after being Top 5 at Femina Miss India 2009 in Mumbai.

== Pageantry ==
=== Femina Miss India 2008, Dethronement ===
Harshita Saxena was crowned Femina Miss India Earth 2008 in Mumbai on 5 April 2008. She had participated in the contest as a regional contestant in Goa and was selected for the main event in December 2007. As a regional winner, she earned direct entry into the Miss India 2008 finals.

However, soon after being crowned, controversy intensified when Maureen Wadia, President of Gladrags, issued a legal notice to Harshita for violating the contract. In an interview with CNN-IBN, Wadia stated that Harshita was a Gladrags model and had signed a binding contract in April 2006. According to the terms, Harshita was required to obtain written permission to enter any other contest during the contract period. Wadia emphasized that no such permission had been granted.

Consequently, her Miss India Earth crown was passed on to Tanvi Vyas, who later represented India in the Miss Earth 2008 pageant held in November 2008.

=== Femina Miss India 2009 ===
Harshita Saxena contested in the Femina Miss India pageant for the second time in 2009, where she made it to the Top 5 finalists. She was crowned 'Agile Femina Miss 10' by Bollywood actress Deepika Padukone and Sanjeev Agrawal, CEO of Pantaloons, during the prestigious beauty pageant held at the Andheri Sports Complex in Mumbai on April 5, 2009.

Although she did not place among the top three winners but she earned the right to represent India at the Miss International 2009 in Chengdu, Sichuan, China.

=== Miss International 2009 ===
Harshita represented India at the Miss International 2009 pageant, which was held on November 28, 2009, at the Sichuan International Tennis Center in Chengdu, China. She went unplaced in the competition.

=== I Am She–Miss Universe India 2010 ===
In 2010, Harshita Saxena participated in the inaugural edition of the I Am She–Miss Universe India pageant, which was established by former Miss Universe Sushmita Sen as the official preliminary to the Miss Universe 2010 competition. The event took place on May 28, 2010, in Mumbai. Harshita competed as a strong crown contender alongside several other national finalists for the coveted title. She placed as a Top 20 semifinalist but failed to enter in Top 10, her participation marked her third major national beauty pageant appearance.

Awards and achievements
Preceded by Radha Brahmbhatt	Miss International India; 2009	Succeeded by Neha Hinge
