= Sudhish Kamath =

Indian film critic

- Education: SBOA School and Junior College, Chennai
- Alma mater: Manipal Institute of Communication
- Occupations: Film Critic, Independent Film Director, Producer and screenwriter
- Years active: 1999–present

Sudhish Kamath is an Indian film critic working with the daily newspaper The Hindu and also an Independent filmmaker. He started working as a Chief reporter with a tabloid called Metro Ads in 1995. Then, from 1997, he worked for A.M.Plus, the Saturday supplement to Udayavani's Morning News. He left that work to join The Hindu in 1999. He mostly writes film review in The Hindu and also interviews film stars and celebrities for the same newspaper.

== Early life ==
Sudhish Kamath did his schooling in SBOA School and Junior College in Chennai. He then did his higher secondary education in DAV Boys Senior Secondary School. He joined DG Vaishnav College in 1994 to pursue Bachelors in Commerce and did Masters in Communication in Manipal Institute of Communication.

== Film career ==
Sudhish Kamath wrote, directed and produced three independent films, one in 2006 called That Four-Letter Word his second in 2010 called Good Night Good Morning and more recently, X – Past is Present.

His upcoming film Side A Side B is an indie musical, scheduled for release in 2020.

== Filmography ==
Year	Film	Director	Producer	Writer	Notes
2006	That Four-Letter Word	Yes	Yes	Yes	
2010	Good Night Good Morning	Yes	Yes	Yes	
2014	X – Past is Present	Yes		Yes	
