= Doordarshan (film) =

2020 Indian Hindi-language family comedy film by Gagan Puri

- Theatrical release poster
- Directed by: Gagan Puri
- Written by: Gagan Puri
- Produced by: Ritu Arya
- Starring: Mahie Gill; Manu Rishi Chaddha; Dolly Ahluwalia; Supriya Shukla; Rajesh Sharma; Mehak Manwani; Sumit Gulati; Manoj Bakshi; Aditya Kumar; Shardul Rana; Archita Sharma
- Cinematography: Soni Singh
- Edited by: Shubham Srivastava
- Music by: Meet Bros
- Production company: Arya Films
- Distributed by: PVR Pictures
- Release date: 28 February 2020
- Running time: 119 minutes
- Country: India
- Language: Hindi

Doordarshan (transl. Distant vision; Television) is a 2020 Indian Hindi-language comedy drama film written and directed by Gagan Puri and produced by Ritu Arya under the Arya Films banner. Based in spirit on the 2003 German film Good Bye, Lenin!, and named after the eponymous Indian public broadcaster, it stars Dolly Ahluwalia, Mahie Gill and Manu Rishi Chaddha in the lead roles. The film was released in theatres on 28 February 2020, and on Netflix on 27 July 2020.

== Plot ==
Sunil "Chiku" Bhateja lives with his young daughter Sweety and son Sunny and is going through a rough phase with his estranged wife Priya "Billo" Bhateja who is demanding a divorce from him. His mother Darshan Kaur Bhateja is in a state of coma for the last 30 years and the rented place belongs to his friend Goldie. Sunil is unwilling to vacate the home due to Darshan's state.

Sunny has a crush on Goldie's daughter Twinkle, and the father is furious about it. Sunny's friend Pappi regularly gets magazines with porn stories and both enjoy reading them. Both are alone at home when Pappi reads out the latest edition of the magazine to Sunny in the room where Darshan is resting. As fate would have it, Darshan wakes up from coma listening to the porn story, and the name of the central character "Bimla" sticks in her mind. However, she falls unconscious again. Later when the doctor examines her, he tells them that she would soon regain her consciousness but her mind is in a very weak state, and thus, they must ensure that they don't do anything to dishearten her.

Everyone quickly starts working on a changeover of the look of the house to the 80s as that's when Darshan went into the coma. The biggest hurdle is that Sunil will have to convince Priya to return home. Sunil pleads her to return and on the insistence of her aunt, she agrees. Here, Sunil has asked his children to pose as househelps. When Darshan finally regains consciousness, Sunil tells her that it has only been 6 months since she has been in a coma and that he is still in high school. When Darshan questions his obesity, he tells her that he is suffering from a thyroid-related disease, hence the weight gain.

Everyone does their part to make her believe that everything is hunky-dory, but Darshan consistently questions who "Bimla" is to which there is initially no answer until Sunny decides to throw Pappi under the bus by suggesting "she" is a friend's mother. Later, she coaxes Priya to marry Sunil and to everyone's surprise, she agrees. A fake marriage ceremony is arranged and they are remarried. On the night of the wedding, Sunil and Priya have a heartful conversation and both of them drop the idea of divorce. Darshan wakes up early the next day and sees that everyone is asleep as they are tired from the wedding ceremony. She receives the newspaper and checks the date to realize that it has been 30 years since her accident which led to her coma. She steps out of the home alone to see the outside world and returns disappointed to see that the society has lost basic morals.

Later, Sunil explains everything and she is happy that Priya had indeed married Sunil. Later, she urges to watch her favourite Hindu mythological serial Ramayan on TV. Instead of playing a Ramayan CD, however, Sweety puts in a porn CD of Sunny and finally it is revealed who Bimla is.

== Cast ==
- Mahie Gill as Priya "Billo" Bhateja
- Manu Rishi Chaddha as Sunil "Chiku" Bhateja
- Dolly Ahluwalia as Darshan Kaur Bhateja
- Mehak Manwani as Twinkle
- Shardhul Rana as Sunny Bhateja
- Supriya Shukla as Geetu
- Rajesh Sharma as Goldie
- Archita Sharma as Sweety Bhateja
- Sumit Gulati as Pappi / Pappu
- Manoj Bakshi as Hindi teacher
- Aditya Kumar as Bunty
- Naresh Gosain as Mr. Malhotra

== Marketing and release ==
The film was released on 28 February 2020

== Soundtrack ==
Doordarshan

Soundtrack album by Meet Bros
- Released: 27 February 2020
- Genre: Feature film soundtrack
- Length: 5:55
- Language: Hindi
- Label: Zee Music Company
External audio
- Official Audio Jukebox on YouTube

The film's music is composed by Meet Bros, who also composed the background score in their first venture as score composers, and lyrics were written by Kumaar.

Track listing
No.	Title	Singer(s)	Length
1.	"Aaya Ladiye"	Meet Bros, Jyotica Tangri, Piyush Mehroliyaa	3:05
2.	"Rukawat Ke Liye Khed Hai"	Meet Bros, Brijesh Shandilya; Rap:Fazilpuriya	2:51
Total length:			5:55
