= Inti No. 13 =

- Theatrical release poster
- Directed by: Panna Royal
- Written by: Venkat Balagoni (dialogues)
- Screenplay by: Panna Royal
- Story by: Panna Royal
- Produced by: Hesan Pacha
- Starring: Naveed Babu; Shivangi Mehra; Irfan; Nikisha; Anandaraj
- Cinematography: P. S. Mani Karnan
- Edited by: S. K. Chalam
- Music by: Vinod Yajamanya
- Production company: Regal Film Productions
- Release date: 1 March 2024
- Country: India
- Language: Telugu

Inti No 13 (transl. House Number 13) is a 2024 Indian Telugu-language horror thriller film directed by Panna Royal and starring Naveed Babu, Shivangi Mehra, Irfan, Nikisha Rangwala and Anandaraj. According to the director, the film was a box office success.

== Cast ==
- Naveed Babu as Arjun
- Shivangi Mehra as Nitya
- Dr Irfan A syed as Sanjay
- Nikkesha Rangwala
- Anandaraj as Gajanand
- Tanikella Bharani
- Prudhvi Raj
- Sudharshan
- Sivannarayana Naripeddi as Giribabu
- Satya Krishnan
- Vijaya Rangaraju
- Ravi Varma
- Deviyani
- Gundu Sudarshan
- Sri Lakshmi
- Geetha Singh
- Sri Sudha
- Lakshmi Kiran
- Baby Sidhiksha
- Master Snehith
- Vijay Kumar

== Production ==
The film's director Panna Royal worked as a VFX supervisor for thirty years. The film was in the making since 2021.

== Reception ==
A critic from The Times of India rated the film two-and-a-half out of five stars and wrote that "Overall, the film with its distinctive approach brings something new to the Telugu horror thriller landscape. The ending of the movie hints at a potential sequel, adding an element of anticipation for fans of the genre". A critic from The Hans India rated the film two-and-three-quarters out of five stars and wrote that "Inti No. 13 emerges as a refreshing choice for aficionados of horror thrillers, rekindling the genre's allure amidst the prevailing dominance of action-centric films". A critic from Times Now rated the film three out of five stars and wrote that "Director Panna Royal, who has previously directed horror thrillers such as Calling Bell and Rakshasi, manages to deliver a unique and gripping horror thriller yet again".
