= Srivalli (2017 film) =

- Theatrical release poster
- Directed by: V. Vijayendra Prasad
- Written by: V. Vijayendra Prasad
- Produced by: Sunitha; Rajkumar Brindaavan
- Starring: Neha Hinge; Rajath Krishna
- Music by: M. M. Srilekha
- Production company: Reshma Arts
- Release date: 15 September 2017
- Running time: 120 minutes
- Country: India
- Language: Telugu

Srivalli is a 2017 Indian Telugu-language science fiction thriller film directed by V. Vijayendra Prasad and produced by Sunitha and Rajkumar Brindaavan. The film stars Neha Hinge and Rajath Krishna in the lead roles. M. M. Srilekha has done the music for the film. The film opened to negative reviews criticising the screenplay, story and bad execution of the film. Neha Hinge's performance as Valli was praised.

Srivalli is a movie about neuroscientist Srivalli who does an experiment about brainwave simulation. The story is about the effects and the consequences she faces once her brain starts reacting to the experiment. Srivalli loses track of the past, present and future, unable to recognize the difference between simulation and reality, which leads to unexplainable results.

== Plot ==
The story is about Srivalli, an NRI pursuing a doctorate on the subconscious memory effects of the human brain. Her father Ramachandra, a doctor had died in a car accident and her brother is in a coma. Currently having a single parent, Srivalli became an orphan and started taking care of her brother and started running her father's trust which encourages work on scientific research. She is in love with her childhood friend Gowtham who is also a PhD scholar in the same field, but she breaks up with him due to her situation.

An old scientist called Verma is researching the power of the subconscious mind which can cure mental illnesses and seeks to understand human mind. He reaches them for funding of his research. Srivalli was amazed by his research and joins with him as a subject for his research and they successfully saved her subconscious memory and Verma helps Valli treating his brother through the subconscious mind. Later Verma went to US for presenting his thesis.

Andria, a lesbian who was once Srivalli's classmate in US tries to stalk her. Then Valli informs it to Gowtham. Knowing this, angered Gowtham kills Andria and he removes all traces. Later in Valli's dream a mysterious person named Majnu comes at every night and is having sex with Valli, every night at the beginning, Valli tries to stop him, but later she was enjoying it. Feeling ashamed and afraid, Valli explains her mysterious situation with Gowtham. Then Gowtham hatches a plan to stop him, but it utterly fails and Majnu tied Gowtham with his mysterious powers and ended up having sex with her again. while having sex, Valli gains her consciousness and tries to scuffle him then the wounded Majnu reveals that Valli is his Laila in her previous birth and he was waiting for her arrival from the day of her death and reveals he is Andria in this birth. Then the angered Andria tries to kill her, but Valli manages to come out from the dream. Coming to reality, her home was completely damaged and Gowtham was tied hard. Valli became paranoid of Majnu and later in a road she sees a blind person who look likes Majnu, makes havoc and it ends up in joining in an asylum.

Later after a recovery from the horrific night she found out that she was virgin and not raped by anyone and Gowtham explains her that Majnu is invisible and he can't be attacked due to his invisibility. The confused pair on the suggestion of Verma meet an exorcist (Jhansi), who reveals that Andria is the devil or the ghost which comes in Valli's dream and tries to dominate her. The exorcist calls Andria's spirit, she reveals that she wants to kill Valli and takes her soul with her. Later at night, Andria comes in Valli's dream and tries to seduce her again, Gowtham comes to her rescue, then suddenly Andria takes both of them to the devil world. There Gowtham successfully destroys Andria then suddenly Valli proposes him for the marriage and asks to take over her property.

Then it is revealed that Gowtham is a fraud who wants revenge on Valli's father Ramachandra for his mother's leaving as a harlot. Because once his mother and Ramachandra were lovers in their college days, being a harlot she was cheating on him, which he found out later and broke up with her. Taking a grudge against him, she continues in her ways, brainwashes her son to destroy him and his family and acquires his property for making Ramachandra responsible for her dirty life. Then it is revealed that Gowtham was responsible for Valli's condition and kidnaps Verma while going to the airport, learns to operate the subconscious memory through him and tries to control Valli's subconscious mind, creating her fears in the dreams and successfully makes her depend on him emotionally. Then it is also revealed that he was the person who caused the accident on Ramachandra to kill him and sent Valli's brother into a coma.

So coming to the present, Valli goes to Shiva's temple, there a thief snatches her rudraksh pendant which her brother had dropped unconsciously to her in the treatment. While in a rough chase the rudraksh jumped into a storeroom, there she finds tied Verma and knowing his evil intentions through him and feels betrayed having loved him truly. Then she understands that her brother was fearing whether Gowtham kills her if she removed her fear on him he will be cured. Then in Verma's laboratory they try to interlink Valli's memory with her brother's. Meanwhile, knowing the doctor has escaped, Gowtham comes to Verma's laboratory to kill all of them. Then Valli comes to the rescue and a fight ensues between Gowtham and Valli in front of her brother who has successfully come out from the coma in an abandoned construction site. There at last Gowtham tries to kill Valli's brother, but to his surprise he was not injured. Then it is revealed that Valli is now controlling Gowtham's and her brother's subconscious mind at a time with utmost concentration and Gowtham realises that Valli is in his dream, in reality Gowtham was facing none and in trance at the same construction site. Then finally Valli gives a death blow to him which makes him fall from the top and kills him.

Finally, the film ends up praising Verma for his research by Indian Government and Srivalli continues her research and her father's goals along with her brother.

== Cast ==
- Neha Hinge as Srivalli
- Rajath Krishna as Gowtham
- Rajiv Kanakala as Ramachandra, Srivalli's father
- Hema
- Arhaan Khan as Majnu

== Soundtrack ==
Srivalli

Film score by M. M. Srilekha
- Released: 2017
- Recorded: 2016
- Genre: Soundtrack
- Length: 13:49
- Label: Aditya Music
- Producer: M. M. Srilekha

M. M. Srilekha chronology
Kadhal Solla Aasai (2013)	Srivalli (2017)

Music composed by M. M. Srilekha. Music released on Aditya Music Company.

No.	Title	Lyrics	Singer(s)	Length
1.	"Laali Laali"	Shivaa Shakthi Datta	M. M. Srilekha	2:10
2.	"Saavariya"	Ananta Sriram	M. M. Srilekha	3:14
3.	"Chinukai Chinukai"	Chaitanya Prasad	M. Ashirwad Luke, Srividhya, Srikar Jonnalagadda	2:41
4.	"lla lla"	Jonnavittula Ramalingeswara Rao	M. M. Srilekha	3:44
5.	"Hara Om Hara"	Bharathibabu	Surya Karthik	2:00
Total length:				13:49
