= Simrithi Bathija =

Indian model and beauty pageant titleholder

- Born: 9 April 1999 (age 27); Mumbai, Maharashtra, India
- Education: Jai Hind College, Mumbai
- Occupations: Model; beauty pageant titleholder
- Height: 1.70 m (5 ft 7 in)
- Beauty pageant titleholder
- Title: Glamanand Supermodel India 2019
- Hair color: Black
- Eye color: Light brown
- Major competitions: Miss Mumbai 2017 (Runners-up); Miss India International 2019 (Winner); Miss International 2019 (Unplaced)

Simrithi Haresh Bathija (born 9 April 1999) is an Indian model and beauty pageant titleholder. As Miss India International 2019, she represented India at the 59th edition of the Miss International pageant in Tokyo, Japan.

== Education and career ==
Simrithi was born on 9 April 1999 in a Sindhi Hindu family and was educated at Sacred Heart School in Thane, Maharashtra. She has a graduation degree in mass media from the Jai Hind College, Mumbai. She is a national level fencing athlete and has played roll ball in state level. She is also a trained dancer, and has worked as a radio jockey for 4 years.

Simrithi was featured in an episode of MTV channel's reality show 'Elevator Pitch'. She appeared in a television commercial for Cinépolis (India). She has worked as a fashion model for various clothing brands.

== Pageantry ==
In 2017, Simrithi was selected as a finalist in the Indian Model Look contest. At the age of 19, she won a regional pageant 'Miss Mumbai 2018'. The following year, she auditioned for the Glamanand Supermodel India contest and was shortlisted as a finalist. 19 finalists from across India competed in the contest. On 29 September 2019, the grand finale of the contest was held in Jai Bagh Palace, Jaipur and Simrithi Bathija was crowned as Miss India International 2019 by the outgoing titleholder Tanishqa Bhosale, earning the right to represent India at the Miss International 2019 pageant which was held in Tokyo, Japan.

== Television ==
Year	Title	Role	Network	Notes
2018	Elevator Pitch	Herself	MTV (India)	Episode 11 - Friend Zone No More

== Film ==
Year	Title	Role	Language	Note	Ref
2022	Dhoop Chhaon	Simran	Hindi		
2024	Dirty Fellow	Chitra	Telugu		

=== Music video appearances ===
Year	Title	Singer(s)	Ref.
2026	"Rukhsana"	Yash Wadali, Mudasir Ali	

== Awards and achievements ==
Awards and achievements
Preceded by Tanishqa Bhosale	Glamanand Miss India International; 2019	Succeeded by Zoya Afroz
