= Nikkesha =

Canadian actress

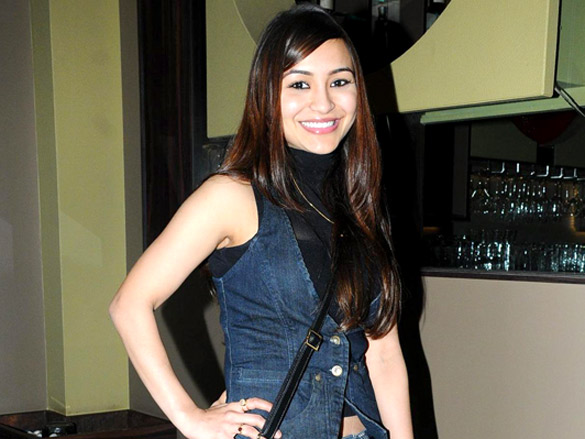
- Born: Nikkesha Rangwala; February 8, 1995 (age 31); Vancouver, Canada
- Education: University of British Columbia (Bachelor of Science); Vancouver Film School
- Occupations: Actress, model, singer
- Known for: Haq Se
- Height: 157 cm (5 ft 2 in)

Nikkesha Rangwala (born 8 February 1995), known mononymously as Nikkesha, is a Canadian actress, model, and singer known for work in Indian films, television, and music videos across Hindi, Gujarati, Telugu, Tamil, and Punjabi industries. She gained recognition for her role as Amal Mirza in the web series Haq Se (2018) and has appeared in films such as Inti No. 13 (2024), Dirty Fellow (2024) and Dream Lock (2024). She has appeared as the lead in over 30 music videos.

== Early life and education ==
Nikkesha was born on 8 February 1995, in Vancouver, Canada to a family of Indian descent. She holds a Bachelor of Science degree in Communication from the University of British Columbia. She was actively involved in musical theatre dance and choir. She took acting and modelling classes at Vancouver Film School, John Casablanca Institute, and Roshan Taneja's Institute for Acting in Mumbai, India.

She is fluent in English, Hindi, Punjabi, and Gujarati, and has trained in Western and Indian classical music.

== Career ==
Modelling and early work

Nikkesha began her career as a model, appearing in over 50 commercials and print campaigns for brands such as Sunsilk, Pantaloons, Dabur Amla, Fastrack, L’Oreal, and Myntra.

Her dance background led to roles in music videos, including "Regret" by Ammy Virk, "Kya Baat Ae" by Karan Aujla, "Raja Rani" by Ninja, and "100 Gulab" by Singga. She also starred in the Canadian musical The List (2015), playing 56 characters as a solo artist, and produced the play Is It Business or Is It Love at Mumbai's National Centre for the Performing Arts (NCPA theatre) in 2016.

=== Acting ===
Nikkesha made her acting debut in the English-language Indian film Lucky Man (2013), also serving as an executive producer. In 2017, she appeared in Gujrati romantic drama Rok Tok opposite Mehul Bhojak.

She gained wider recognition for her role as Amal Mirza in AltBalaji's web series Haq Se (2018), an Indian adaptation of Little Women.

In 2020, she played Sruthi in the Telugu mystery thriller film Missing: Search vs Revenge.

In 2024, Nikkeshs starred in Telugu-language horror thriller Inti No. 13 and subsequently in romantic action drama Dirty Fellow as Saira and later appeared in the Tamil drama Bhai: Sleeper Cells and the Hindi crime mystery Dream Lock, playing Jennifer opposite Faisal Sayed.

Additionally, she is set to appear in the Hindi OTT film Pati, Patni and Kand, a Lucknow-based crime thriller, in a lead role.

Music

In 2024, Nikkesha ventured into singing, recording a Punjabi track with Balkar Dhillon in Canada and preparing a duet with Indian Idol 13 winner Rishi Singh. She also recorded a song for Pati, Patni and Kand after encouragement from the film's director.

== Filmography ==
=== Films ===
Year	Film / Series	Role	Notes
2013	Lucky Man		Also executive producer
2017	Rok Tok		Gujarati
2020	Missing: Search vs Revenge	Sruthi	Telugu film
2024	Bhai: Sleeper Cells		
2024	Inti No. 13		Telugu film
2024	Dirty Fellow	Saira	Telugu film
2024	Dream Lock	Jennifer	
2025	Pati, Patni and Kand		Hindi film

=== Web series ===
Year	Title	Role	Platform	Notes
2018	Haq Se	Amal Mirza	AltBalaji	

=== Music videos ===
Year	Song	Artist	Role	Notes
2016	Adaayein	Amit Tandon	Female lead	
2019	Do You Remember	Jordan Sandhu	Female lead	
2019	Photo	Singga	Female lead	
2019	Struggler	R. Nait	Female lead	
2019	Hawaa	B Praak, Grann Sidhu	Female lead	
2019	Aakad	Sanam Parowal	Female lead	
2020	Mashoor Ho Giya	Jordan Sandhu	Female lead	
2020	Wish	Nikk	Female lead	
2020	Pink Pink Addiyaan	Jigar, Amrit Maan	Female lead	
2020	Wah Wah Jatta	Rohanpreet Singh	Female lead	
2020	Kya Baat Aa	Karan Aujla	Female lead (2nd)	
2020	Regret	Ammy Virk	Female lead	
2020	Des Ae Tera	Karan Sehmbi	Female lead	
2021	Dhund Di Khushboo	Kaka	Female lead	
2021	Yaraane	Gur Sidhu	Female lead	
2021	100 Gulab	Singga	Female lead	
2021	Evergreen	Jigar	Female lead	
2021	Dastaan E Ishq	R. Nait	Female lead	
2021	Jaan Jaan Ke	Dilbar Singh	Female lead	
2022	Maar Sutteya	Gajendra Verma	Female lead	
2022	I Don't Remember	Deep Jandu	Female lead	
2023	Dil Da Black	Runbir	Female lead	
2023	Gussa Enna Pyara	Karan Sehmbi	Female lead	
2023	Fallin Apart	Karan Aujla	Female lead	
2023	Saah	Singga	Female lead	
2024	Pasand	HRJXT, Intense	Female lead	
2024	Raja Rani	Ninja	Female lead	
2025	PAGAL	Tedda Banda	Female lead	
2025	Mulaqaat	Jassa Dhillon	Female lead	

== Personal life ==
Nikkesha is a Kathak dancer and has a background in musical theatre and choir in Vancouver.
