= Unnale Unnale =

- Poster
- Directed by: Jeeva
- Written by: Srinath Sahadevan (uncredited); Jeeva
- Dialogues by: Sujatha
- Produced by: V. Ravichandran
- Starring: Vinay; Sadha; Tanishaa
- Cinematography: Jeeva
- Edited by: V. T. Vijayan
- Music by: Harris Jayaraj
- Production company: Aascar Film
- Release date: 14 April 2007
- Running time: 147 minutes
- Country: India
- Language: Tamil

Unnale Unnale (transl. Because of You) is a 2007 Indian Tamil-language musical romantic comedy film written, photographed and directed by Jeeva and produced by Oscar Ravichandran. It stars Vinay, Sadha and Tanishaa in lead roles; Raju Sundaram, Srinath and Sathish Krishnan in supporting roles; and Lekha Washington, Aravind Akash, Uma Padmanabhan, and Vasundhara Kashyap in cameo roles. Sundaram also choreograped the songs for the film. This film marked Vinay's feature film debut and Tanishaa's only Tamil film that she ever acted. The soundtrack and film has received a cult status over the years.

The film revolves around the aftermath of a relationship between a careless man and a serious woman. Despite being in a relationship, the latter walks out on the former due to his antics with other women. However, the man changes his ways and on a business trip to Melbourne, he encounters another woman. This other woman's boss turns out to be the man's former lover. The events that follow and who the man eventually gets together with form the crux of the story. The Telugu dubbed version was titled Neevalle Neevalle and released simultaneously with the Tamil version.

The film opened to Indian audiences after several delays, on 14 April 2007, coinciding with the Tamil New Year. The film received positive reviews and became a blockbuster hit at box office. It marked the last directorial venture of Jeeva before his death on 26 June 2007.

== Plot ==
The film opens with a man (Aravind Akash) and woman interviewing civilians on love and the opposite sex. After a mixture of answers, they cease their questions, and the credits roll. The credits end as a boy, after being rejected by his girlfriend, is accidentally hit by a passing car and dies. Karthik (Vinay) walks off, disturbed, to his girlfriend Jhansi's (Sadha) office. There, he is criticized by her for his antics with other women and his lack of passion for their love. She walks off, ending their relationship.

Karthik is then shown as a civil engineer in Chennai, still playful and fun-loving. Accepting a request from his manager to go on a six-month business trip to Melbourne, he bids farewell to his friends Raju (Raju Sundaram) and Sathish (Sathish Krishnan). On the plane, he encounters a playful, flirtatious girl named Deepika (Tanishaa), whom he sits next to during the flight. After spending hours together, they become friends and exchange contact details. However, by coincidence, Deepika is travelling to Melbourne to work in the same company as Jhansi, who is settled there. Together they seem to conveniently bump into Karthik at every corner, prompting an unwelcome reunion for Jhansi and Karthik.

While Deepika takes a liking to Karthik, Jhansi ignores him, even though he has hopes of getting back together. At a restaurant, Karthik bumps into a fellow Tamilian named Vaidyanathan (Srinath) and explains his love for Jhansi. The story then flashes back two years. Karthik had met Jhansi at a festival in a temple, where she played a prank on him and his friends. Taking a liking to Jhansi, Karthik begins to follow her intentionally, hoping for her to fall in love with him. Soon after, she becomes more and more suspicious of Karthik. This comes to a head when Karthik acts as the boyfriend of Raju's girlfriend Pooja (Paloma Rao), only for Jhansi to get confused and mistake him. His reputation as a trusting boyfriend takes another turn for the worse, when at a wedding, the bride (Lekha Washington) gives him a kiss after he improvises a song.

As the pair have a love-hate relationship, the breakup beckons when Jhansi sends her friend (Vasundhara Kashyap) undercover to flirt with Karthik. However, he lies by claiming that he was at home ill, prompting Jhansi to end their relationship. At the end of the flashback, Vaidyanathan suggests to Karthik that it is more important to move on than think regretfully, and Karthik gets over his relationship with Jhansi. However, finding out about Deepika's love towards Karthik, Jhansi becomes jealous and reinstates her love for Karthik. Soon, as she sees Deepika and Karthik's compatibility and understanding her fault, she finally understands what went wrong in their relationship. Then, Karthik tells her through a meaningful conversation that he still loves her, not Deepika. After this, Jhansi runs away to Sydney surreptitiously.

At the end of the film, the male interviewer who appeared at the start questions Jhansi on her decision to leave anonymously; however, she refuses to answer at first. Later, she replies that though she still loves Karthik, she was unable to understand him well. She knew that it would not work out and that she did not want to hurt Karthik further, thus becoming the sole reason for her departure. She then confirms that she met up with Deepika recently, and had found that she is married to Karthik and they have a child. She then walks away, claiming that her future lies in her own hands, and she is happy the way she is now.

== Cast ==
- Vinay as Karthik
- Sadha as Jhansi (Voice dubbed by Renuka Kathir)
- Tanishaa as Deepika (Voice dubbed by Chinmayi)
- Raju Sundaram as Raju
- Srinath as Vaidyanathan
- Sathish as Sathish
- Uma Padmanabhan as Karthik's sister
- Vasundhara Kashyap as Jhansi's friend
- Siddharth Chandrasekhar as Karthik’s friend
- Devan as Vaidyanathan's roommate
- Aravind Akash as a male interviewer
- Paloma as Priya
- Japan Kumar as Vaidyanathan's roommate
- Lekha Washington as a wedding bride (cameo appearance)

== Production ==
Unnale Unnale became Jeeva's last finished film prior to his death on the sets of his next film, Dhaam Dhoom. Vinay made his debut into the film industry after modelling and featuring in a couple of Tulu advertisements. Tanishaa made her first and only Tamil films appearance with this film. The film was mostly shot in Melbourne, Australia. Chinmayi dubbed for Tanishaa.

== Soundtrack ==
Unnale Unnale

Soundtrack album by Harris Jayaraj
- Released: 15 December 2006
- Recorded: 2006
- Genre: Soundtrack
- Length: 29:01
- Language: Tamil
- Label: Saregama
- Producer: Harris Jayaraj

Harris Jayaraj chronology
| Pachaikili Muthucharam (2007) | Unnale Unnale (2006) | Munna (2007) |

The film has six songs composed by Harris Jayaraj with the lyrics primarily penned by Vaali and Pa. Vijay. The audio of the film released nationwide on 24 January 2007.

Sify gave a positive rating stating "Full marks to Harris Jeyaraj for the songs especially the “Unnale Unnale...”, “June Pona...” and the background score which stays long after you leave the hall. They are picturised aesthetically in never-seen-before locations with utmost care going into details. " Karthik of Milliblog wrote, "The usual again from HJ…likeable and repetitive!" The soundtrack was highly acclaimed and won the "Youthful Album of the Year" award at "Tamil Music Awards". Harris Jayaraj was also nominated for the Filmfare Award for Best Music Director and the Vijay Award for Best Music Director. The ending hook of "Ilamai Ulasam" is based on the beginning hook of "Here Comes the Hotstepper" by Ini Kamoze.

Track-List
| No. | Title | Lyrics | Singer(s) | Length |
|---|---|---|---|---|
| 1. | "June Ponal" | Pa. Vijay | Krish, Arun | 6:01 |
| 2. | "Hello Miss Imsaiyae" | Vaalee | G. V. Prakash, Anushka Manchanda | 4:31 |
| 3. | "Vaigasi Nilavae" | Vaalee | Haricharan, Madhushree | 5:40 |
| 4. | "Mudhal Naal" | Pa. Vijay | KK, Pop Shalini, Mahalaxmi Iyer | 4:27 |
| 5. | "Unnale Unnale" | Pa. Vijay | Karthik, Krish, Harini | 4:43 |
| 6. | "Ilamai Ulasam" | Pa. Vijay | Krish, Pop Shalini | 2:10 |
| 7. | "Siru Siru Uravugal" | Vaalee | Krish | 1:29 |
| Total length: | | | | 29:01 |

All tracks are written by Bhuvanachandra.

Telugu Track-List
| No. | Title | Singer(s) | Length |
|---|---|---|---|
| 1. | "June Pothe" | Krish, Arun | 6:00 |
| 2. | "Hello Miss" | G. V. Prakash Kumar, Chinmayi | 4:29 |
| 3. | "Vysakha Vennela" | Haricharan, Swarnalatha | 5:40 |
| 4. | "Modhalennadu" | Naresh Iyer, Pop Shalini, Mahalaxmi Iyer | 4:27 |
| 5. | "Neevalle Neevalle" | Karthik, Krish, Harini | 4:42 |
| 6. | "Yavvana Ullasam" | Krish, Pop Shalini | 2:08 |
| Total length: | | | 27:26 |

== Release and reception ==
The film was released worldwide on Tamil New Year's Day, 14 April 2007. In Malaysia it was released in six major metropolises for up to 9 weeks, and the film collected $114,883 (then approximately ₹5 million) within its 50-day run.

Rediff.com praised Sadha's, Tanishaa's, and Vinay's performances. Lajjavathi of Kalki praised the acting of lead pair, humour, Jayaraj's music, Ramakrishnan's dialogues and added Jeeva scored both as cinematographer and director and praised him for narrating the plot like a Haiku and felt the screenplay was fast paced and concluded saying let's welcome this Unnale Unnale to come and sit in the row of films like 'Mozhi'. Chennai Online wrote "A youthful colourful ambience, a handsome star cast, and some pleasant melodies, all packaged in attractive frames was the trademark of Jeeva's earlier films. Unnale Unnale the cinematographer-director's third venture, has all these elements. And when the narration tends to lag a little or the scenes turn repetitive, it's these factors that keep it going". Sify wrote "Unnale Unnale is an urban romantic fun film that explores love from a slightly realistic and different point of view. The movie does not have clichéd characters nor the typical masalas associated with Tamil films and is packaged in Bollywood style. Though some of the scenes are straight lifts from various Hollywood and Bollywood films, director Jeeva has succeeded in bringing out brilliant performances from his lead actors and presenting the film in a chic and sophisticated manner".

== Home media ==
The DVD version of the film was released on 8 August 2007 in the United Kingdom. This DVD release was distributed by Ayngaran International all around the world. It is available in 16:9 Anamorphic widescreen, Dolby Digital 5.1 Surround, progressive 24 FPS, widescreen and NTSC format.

== Legacy ==
The film made business for Vinay, who signed up many films after the project. The original title of this film, July Kaatril, inspired a film of the same name, also based on a love triangle between the lead actors, just like in Unnale Unnale.
