= Dekho Magar Pyaar Se =

2004 Indian soap opera

- Genre: Soap opera
- Based on: My Sweet Fat Valentina
- Screenplay by: Sutapa Sikdar
- Dialogues by: Sutapa Sikdar
- Directed by: Santram Varma; Shrey Guleri; Guroudev Bhall
- Art director: Sanjay Dhabade
- Starring: Shraddha Nigam / Shweta Agarwal; Kushal Punjabi; Keith Sequeira
- Theme music composer: Pritam
- Opening theme: "Dekho Magar Pyaar Se..." by Abhijeet Bhattacharya
- Country of origin: India
- Original language: Hindi
- No. of seasons: 2
- No. of episodes: 176

Production
- Executive producer: Aman Khanna
- Producers: Rakesh Luthra; Sahil Guleri
- Cinematography: Sudesh Kotian; Lokesh Bhalla
- Editor: Nilesh Muley
- Running time: Approximately 22 minutes
- Production companies: Prime Channel; BAG Films; StarPlus

Original release
- Network: StarPlus
- Release: 26 July 2004 – 15 September 2005

Dekho Magar Pyaar Se (transl. Look, but with love) is an Indian Hindi-language television soap opera that aired on StarPlus from 2004 to 2005.

It was officially adapted from the 2002 Venezuelan Spanish-language telenovela, Mi gorda bella (English title: My Sweet Fat Valentina).

Starring Shweta Agarwal and Keith Sequeira, as the leads, in the earlier episodes, the show was written by Sutapa Sikdar and directed by Shrey Guleri and Guroudev Bhall.

A television series created for StarPlus and initially produced only by Prime Channel, it was later on reassigned by StarPlus to BAG Films and became a joint production between BAG Films and StarPlus.

== Premise ==
Premise by (defunct) StarPlus website: (Note: The STAR Group acquired indya.com in August 2001.)

“Everyone who knows the young Nikita Sareen, loves her. Her beautiful spirit and sweet disposition makes up for her less-than-perfect physical appearance. Food is the salve that soothes her empty heart and nurtures her through the pain of having been exiled into boarding school at an early age. Just when fate seems about to smile on her, tragedy takes her mother's life and Nikki is forced to live under the hateful grip of her uncle's menacing wife Devyani, who tries everything in her power to rob her of her inheritance.

Fate's grim sense of humour then shoots Cupid's arrow as Karan (Devyani's nephew who lives with them) falls madly in love with Nikki seeing straight through her pudginess to the enchantment within. What follows is an intriguing tapestry of heartbreak and heroism; deception and discovery; and dramatic choices that will forever change the lives of those she loves and hates the most.

In Nikki's quest for justice, the startling truth emerges and she must choose between vindication and protecting her true love from an unveiling that could destroy his world. The masks will come off and she will be faced with the challenge of spending the rest of her life seeking forgiveness from the person whose love she can't live without, the person whose passion has inspired her to become an admirably beautiful and successful woman.”

== Cast ==
- Shweta Agarwal / Shraddha Nigam as Nikita Sareen "Nikki" / Anamika
- Keith Sequeira as Karan
- Kushal Punjabi as Arjun
- Reena Kapoor as Kaya
- Sweta Keswani / Priyanka Bassi as Tanya Bedi
- Amit Behl as Bobby Bedi
- Sushma Prakash as Tara Bedi
- Sudhir Pandey as Surender
- Manoj Bidwai as Abhi
- Aashish Kaul as Anil
- Anupam Bhattacharya as K.K.
- Anuradha Patel as Sarika Sareen
- Reena Wadhwa as Devyani
- Vaishnavi Mahant as Priyanka Maasi
- Malini Kapoor as Yaana
- Vishal Watwani as Sameer
- Rocky Verma as Baba Kidnapper
- Addite Shirwaikar
- Mehul Nisar

== Production ==
=== Casting ===
After an audition, including a screen test with fatsuit on, Shweta Agarwal was chosen to portray Nikki.

In May 2005, Agarwal was replaced by Shraddha Nigam, owing to former's leg injury.

A 'New Look' promo was also telecast on television, hinting at Agarwal being replaced in the foreseeable future.

Sweta Keswani, who played Tanya Bedi, left the show in November 2004.

Reena Kapoor, who played Kaya, also left the show, when the show's track changed.

Anupam Bhattacharya, who played K.K. in the show, returned in a new track, in July 2005.

== Soundtrack ==
The title track of the series, Khwab Ki Chhaon Mein Hai Pali Hui (Dekho Magar Pyaar Se), was composed by Pritam and was sung by Abhijeet Bhattacharya.

== Release ==
Dekho Magar Pyaar Se premiered on television on 26 July 2004. The series was launched on 24 July 2004 at New Delhi.

== Reception ==
=== Audience viewership ===
According to the TAM Media Research data, Dekho Magar Pyaar Se opened in its first week at the 40th spot in the CS 4+ (Cable & Satellite; 4 years of age or older) ratings.

On its opening day, in the TG (Target Group) CS 4+ i.e. Hindi-speaking markets, it recorded an average TVR (Television Viewership Rating) of 3.7 in its 8:00 pm to 8:30 pm time slot.

However, in its first three weeks, it recorded a steady decline in terms of average TVR, the same being 3.9, 3.4, and 3 respectively.

== Renewal and cancellation ==
The series was renewed for the second season, but by that time, there already were speculations of the series being replaced by another series, because the series was not clicking with the audience.

Owing to not delivering a satisfactory TVR, despite taking space of the prime time slot, the series went off air on the third Thursday of September 2005 and was replaced by Mum Tum Aur Hum—a game show hosted by Shruti Seth and Rajinder Sharma "Nanu"—that premiered on 19 September 2005.
