= Neha Hinge =

Indian model and actress (born 1985)

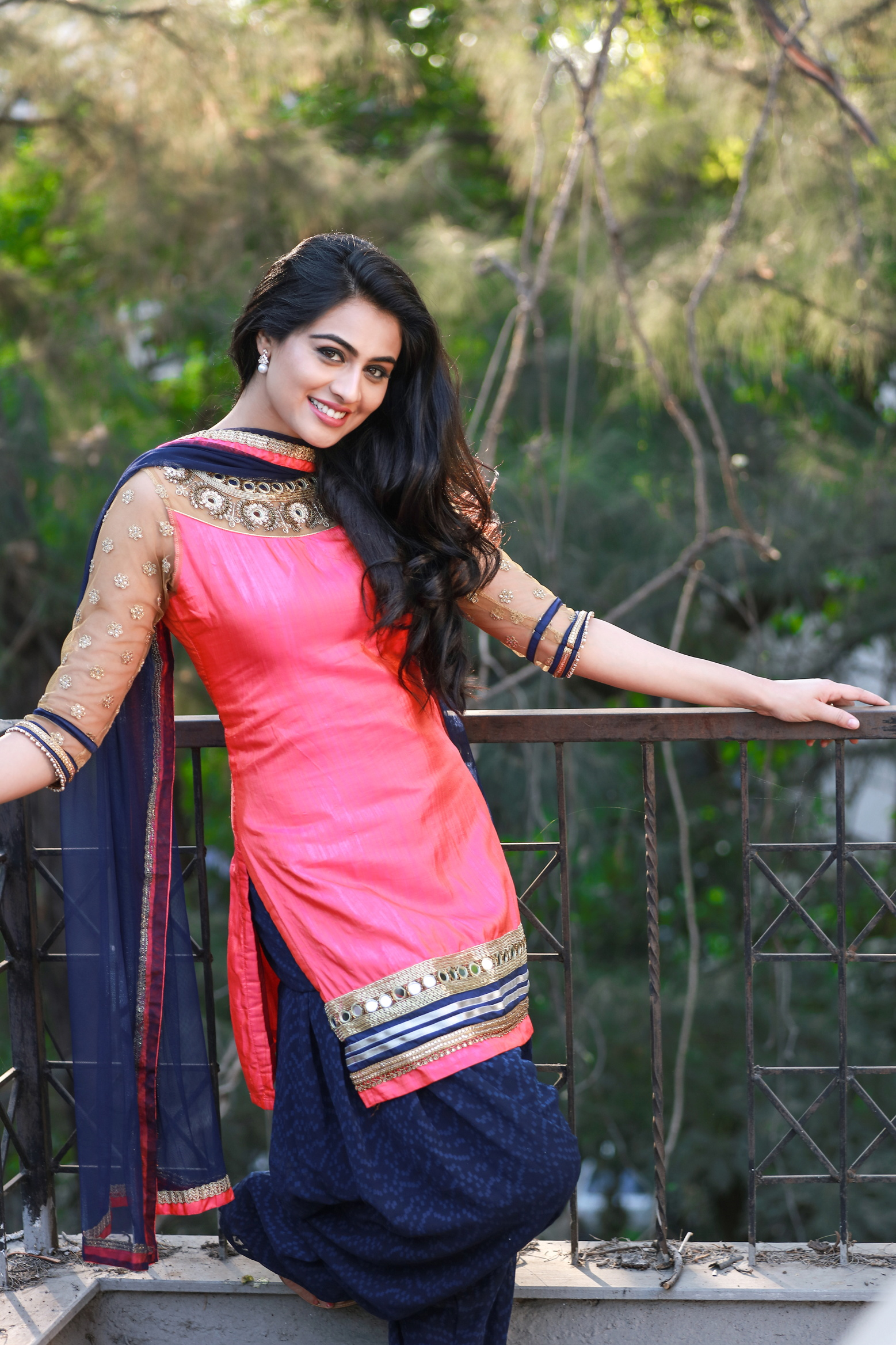
- Hinge during a photoshoot
- Born: 30 April 1991 (age 35); Dewas, Madhya Pradesh, India
- Education: Dr. D.Y. Patil College of Engineering, Pune
- Occupations: Actress, model
- Height: 1.68 m (5 ft 6 in)
- Beauty pageant titleholder
- Title: Femina Miss India International 2010
- Hair colour: Black
- Eye colour: Hazel
- Major competition: Miss International 2010

Neha Hinge is an Indian actress, model, and beauty pageant titleholder. She was crowned Femina Miss India International in the Femina Miss India 2010 pageant and represented India in Miss International 2010 held in Tokyo, where she made it in the top 15 semifinalists.

== Early life ==
Neha was born in Nashik and spent her formative years in Dewas, Madhya Pradesh. She did her schooling from St Mary's and BCM Higher Secondary School in Dewas and later completed her Bachelor of Engineering from Dr. D.Y Patil Institute of Engineering and Technology, Pune. Neha, a qualified software engineer, quit her IT job to enter the Miss India pageant.

== Femina Miss India ==
She was crowned Femina Miss India International in 2010. She also won subtitles, Miss Fresh Face, Miss Professional and Miss Bollywood Diva. She competed in Miss International 2010 and secured a spot among the Top 15 contestants. She persuaded modelling later by being a part of major fashion weeks like Lakme fashion week, Blenders pride fashion tour, IIJW and many more. She has done more than 25 TV commercials for brands like Sunsilk, Pantaloons, Hero Cycles, Joyalukas, Malabar Gold, Kalyan silks to list a few.

In 2017, she played a nurse in the 2017 film Tiger Zinda Hai. She made her Telugu film debut the same year in Srivalli, where she played the title role. She is well known for her role as the prime time reporter Garima Deswal in Amazon Prime web series Tandav. She had also played Malti Kumar in Zee5 film Nail Polish.

== Filmography ==
Year	Film	Role	Notes
2013	Luv U Soniyo	Soniyo	Hindi debut
2015	Sagaptham	Neha	Tamil film
2017	Srivalli	Srivalli	Telugu film
2017	Tiger Zinda Hai	Maria	
2021	Tandav	Garima Deswal	Amazon Prime Video series
2021	Nail Polish	Malthi Kumar	A ZEE5 originals film
2021	LSD: Love, Scandal & Doctors	Chitra	ZEE5, ALTBalaji series

Awards and achievements
Preceded by Harshita Saxena	Miss International India; 2010	Succeeded by Ankita Shorey
