= Sweetiee Weds NRI =

2017 film

- Directed by: Hasnain Hyderabadwala
- Written by: Tariq Mohammad
- Produced by: Dhaval Patel; Tariq Mohammad; Sada S. Bhuvad; Cyrus F. Dastur; Sharad Patel
- Starring: Himansh Kohli; Zoya Afroz; Darshan Jariwala, Kiran Juneja; Babloo Mukherji
- Cinematography: Udaysingh Mohite; Madhukar S. Rao
- Edited by: Sandeep Singh Bajeli
- Music by: Songs; Arko Pravo Mukherjee; Palash Muchhal; Jaidev Kumar; Raaj Aashoo; Shah Jahan Ali; Background Score; Amar Mohile
- Production companies: Asmiy Entertainment; Grand Motion Picture; SP Cinecorp
- Release date: 2 June 2017
- Running time: 116 minutes
- Country: India
- Language: Hindi

Sweetiee Weds NRI is a 2017 Indian Hindi film directed by Hasnain Hyderabadwala, and produced by Asmiy Entertainment and Grand Motion Picture. It stars Himansh Kohli and Zoya Afroz in the lead roles along with Darshan Jariwala, Kiran Juneja in Supporting roles and had its theatrical release on 2 June 2017.

== Plot ==
Sweetiee Desai is a happy-go-lucky Gujarati girl of around 22 years, born to a wealthy businessman of Baroda. Her father is a jolly good person with only one ambition – to get his daughter married to an NRI from England. The reason being he was deported from the UK many years ago.

== Cast ==
- Himansh Kohli as Aakash Patel
- Zoya Afroz as Sweety Desai
- Darshan Jariwala as Bhoolabhai Desai
- Kiran Juneja as Jigna Desai
- Babloo Mukherji as Bubba Banerji
- Adi Irani as Jazz Mehta
- Ankit Arora as Rashiklal "Rascal" Mehta
- Shekhar Shukla as Amit Shah
- Farzil Pardiwalla as DK
- Shreyas Pardiwallaas Einstein (Guest Appearance)
- Shruti Gholap as Shruti Banerji
- Saadhvi Singh as Aalia
- Lipi Goyal as Druma
- Vikrant Sakhalkar as Chaman Bhai
- Babloo Mukherjee as Professor

== Soundtrack ==
Sweetiee Weds NRI

Soundtrack album by Arko Pravo Mukherjee, Palash Muchhal, Jaidev Kumar, Raaj Aashoo and Shah Jahan Ali
- Released: 24 May 2017
- Genre: Feature film soundtrack
- Length: 45:52
- Language: Hindi
- Label: T-Series
External audio
- Audio Jukebox on YouTube

The music of the film is composed by Arko Pravo Mukherjee, Palash Muchhal, Jaidev Kumar, Raaj Aashoo and Shah Jahan Ali while the lyrics were written by Banjara Rafi, Muchhal, Mukherjee, Shakeel Azmi, Dr. Devendra Kafir and Shyam Bhateja. Its first song titled as "O Saathiya" sung by Armaan Malik and Prakriti Kakar was released on 10 May 2017. The second song "Musafir" sung by Atif Aslam and Muchhal was released on 16 May 2017. The third song titled as "Kudi Gujrat Di" which is sung by Akasa Singh, Jasbir Jassi and Sonia Sharma and Rapped By KD was released on 18 May 2017. The fourth song to be released was "Musafir (Reprise)" which is sung by Arijit Singh was released on 22 May 2017. The soundtrack was released on 24 May 2017 by T-Series.

Track listing
No.	Title	Lyrics	Music	Singer(s)	Length
1.	"O Saathiya"	Arko Pravo Mukherjee	Arko Pravo Mukherjee	Armaan Malik, Prakriti Kakar	3:54
2.	"Musafir"	Palak Muchhal	Palash Muchhal	Atif Aslam, Palak Muchhal	5:10
3.	"Kudi Gujarat Di"	Dr. Devendra Kafir, Shyam Bhateja	Jaidev Kumar	Akasa Singh, Jasbir Jassi, Sonia Sharma Rap: KD	3:42
4.	"Wedding"	Palak Muchhal	Palash Muchhal	Palak Muchhal, Shahid Mallya	3:37
5.	"Shiddat"	Shakeel Azmi	Raaj Aashoo	Armaan Malik	5:38
6.	"Zindagi Bana Loon"	Banjara Rafi	Shah Jahan Ali	Palak Muchhal	4:56
7.	"Kinara"	Palak Muchhal	Palash Muchhal	Palak Muchhal	4:30
8.	"Musafir (Reprise)"	Palak Muchhal	Palash Muchhal	Arijit Singh	5:14
9.	"Musafir (Remix)"	Palak Muchhal	Palash Muchhal	Atif Aslam, Arijit Singh	3:33
10.	"Shiddat (Reprise)"	Shakeel Azmi	Raaj Aashoo	Mohammed Irfan	5:38
Total length:					45:52
