= Sixteen (2013 Indian film) =

- Theatrical release poster
- Directed by: Raj Purohit
- Written by: Raj Purohit; Pawan Sony
- Produced by: So Singh; Vishwas Joshi
- Starring: Rohan Mehra; Zakir Hussain; Keith Sequeira; Wamiqa Gabbi
- Cinematography: Sriram Ganapathy
- Music by: Prashant Pillai; Adam Avil; Eddie Avil; Gaurav Dagaonkar
- Release date: 12 July 2013
- Running time: 140 minutes
- Country: India
- Language: Hindi

Sixteen is a 2013 Hindi coming-of-age drama film directed by Raj Purohit and starring debutants Izabelle Leite, Wamiqa Gabbi, Mehak Manwani and Mathew in the lead roles, while Rohan Mehra, Keith Sequeira and Zakir Hussain play supporting roles.

== Plot ==
Sixteen is a story about lost innocence and teenage heartache in urban India. In the times of the Internet, Page 3 in newspapers, and more than 300 TV channels, the innocence of the youth is the first victim of overexposure.

Anu is a carefree and ambitious girl who wants to be a model. Nidhi is an innocent virgin and is usually taunted by her peers for being so. Tanisha is mature for her age and likes handsome guys with a good sense of humour and intelligence. She has lived with her aunt since her parents died in an accident. Ashwin belongs to a middle-class family with a strict father who wants him to be an IAS officer.

Nidhi is going out with Kartik and Kartik wants to take things further, but Nidhi wants to wait for the 'right time and the right place'. Tanisha and Ashwin are best friends, but Ashwin has a crush on Tanisha, and she sees him only as a friend. Anu changes her boyfriends all the time. A handsome and intelligent writer, Vikram Kapoor, comes to live as a tenant at Tanisha's place, and he immediately develops feelings for her due to events in his past.

One day, Ashwin confesses his feelings to Tanisha. She politely denies him, and he is devastated and nearly commits suicide. On the same day, Ashwin's father finds porn on his computer and beats him up. Ashwin retaliates, hits his father with one of his achievement trophies, and his father dies. His mother falsely confesses that she did it and takes the blame. Ashwin runs away from his house, and the next day he is confronted by a gang of young criminals, who induct him into their gang.

To make things more complicated, even Tanisha's aunt develops feelings for Vikram and reveals them to him. Anu learns that her parents are in an open marriage and is devastated, and after a few days, Nidhi suspects that she is pregnant. Anu goes to buy a pregnancy test kit for her and bumps into her ex-boyfriend, who asks her why she dumped him. Anu humiliates him badly and leaves.

Nidhi finds out that she is now pregnant with Kartik's baby. They decide on abortion, but due to some complications, Nidhi is shifted to another hospital. She has to stay there for two days. Nidhi lies to her mother about where she is.

Meanwhile, Anu discovers that her ex-boyfriend has leaked an MMS depicting her in a compromising position. She is rusticated from her school for that. Tanisha finds out that Vikram is leaving for London soon. A female rival of Nidhi, Anu, and Tanisha tells Nidhi's mother why she actually is in the hospital. Her parents rush to the hospital and comfort her.

Ashwin's gang decides to rob a house whose only occupant is an old man. While executing their plan, Ashwin is confronted and is about to kill the old man when he says that his son is an IAS officer. Ashwin breaks down and bursts into tears. Anu is about to commit suicide when her brother calls her and tells her that he is arriving next weekend. On hearing this, she quits her suicide attempt. Tanisha, sad that Vikram is about to leave the next day, goes and sleeps in his room with him.

One year later, Nidhi is enrolled in an all-girls school. Anu has applied for the Miss India contest, and her parents are supportive of her, and she loves them. Vikram has written a novel named 'Sixteen' which has been nominated for the Booker Prize finals. Anu, Tanisha, and Nidhi decided to go and meet Ashwin in the juvenile correction home he was kept in. Tanisha kisses Ashwin on the cheek, indicating that she has started liking him.

== Cast ==
- Izabelle Leite as Anu
- Wamiqa Gabbi as Tanisha
- Mehak Manwani as Nidhi
- Highphill Mathew as Ashwin
- Rohan Mehra as Karthik
- Sumit Bharadwaj as Sameer
- Varun Jhamb as Rishi
- Amitabh Sanduja as Anu's father
- Molika Verma as Anu's mother
- Sanjeev Singh as Nidhi's father
- Zakir Hussain as Ashwin's father
- Alka Chatarwal as Ashwin's mother
- Keith Sequeira as Vikram Kapoor
- Prabhleen Sandhu as Deepti, Tanisha's aunt
- Ankur Anand

== Critical reception ==
Glamsham.com rated the movie a 4/5 while Taran Adarsh of Bollywood Hungama rated the movie 3/5 and observed that, "Sixteen is well intentional and tackled relevant issues". "Simple but never simple-minded, this is a must watch. " writes Saibal Chatterjee, NDTV. Karan Anshuman of Mumbai Mirror rated the movie 2 out of 5. Indian Express reviewer Shubhra Gupta gave the movie 3 stars out of 5. Times of India gave the movie 2.5 stars out of 5.
