= That Four-Letter Word =

That Four Letter Word
- Directed by: Sudhish Kamath
- Written by: Murugan; Sudhish Kamath
- Produced by: Sashi Chimala; Sudhish Kamath
- Starring: Aashil Nair; Cary Edwards; Evam Sunill; Usha Seetharam; Paloma Rao; Praveen Bharatwaj; Roshni Menon
- Cinematography: Pradeep Kalipurayath
- Music by: Asif Ali
- Release date: 21 December 2006
- Country: India
- Language: English

That Four Letter Word is an Indian independent English-language film written and directed by Sudhish Kamath. The film, which is about a group of friends at the crossroads of life, features a set of new actors including Aashil Nair, Cary Edwards, Evam Sunill, Usha Seetharam, Paloma Rao, Praveen Bharatwaj and Roshni Menon. The film premiered at the Chennai International Film Festival on 21 December 2006 and had a limited release in Chennai on 23 February 2007.

== Cast ==
- Aashil Nair as Sunil
- Cary Edwards as Vishal
- Praveen Bharatwaj as Prashant
- Sunil Vishnu as Zebra
- Usha Seetharam as Isha
- Paloma Rao as Sara
- Michael Muthu as a director
- R. Madhavan in a cameo appearance

== Production ==
The story of the film was written by journalist Sudhish Kamath and his college friend, Murugan, during 1999. The film began its shoot in 2002 with video jockey Ranvir Shorey being the first person cast in the film, in the role of Zebra, after he became acquainted with Sudhish during an interview he had made to The Hindu. Shorey's colleague Purab Kohli had also expressed an interest in starring in the film but later got busy with the making of the Hindi film, Supari (2003), meaning that another video jockey, Carey Edwards, was cast in the role of Vishal. Cyrus Sahukar also joined the film in 2002 to portray the role of Sunil but later backed out and was replaced by actor Abbas, who had previously worked with Sudhish Kamath on a short film titled Ellipsis. The shoot progressed intermittently throughout 2002 and 2003 before Shorey opted out citing bigger commitments and production delays. The team held unsuccessful negotiations with Cyrus Broacha to replace him, but his refusal meant that the team convinced and successfully re-signed Shorey to star in the film with a higher salary. Suchitra and video jockey Usha Seetharam were also attached to the film as the leading actresses. Costumes for the first version of the film were handled by designer Binu Jha.

However production troubles meant that progress was slow and with 95% of the shoot completed, the film was stalled. The team briefly considered financing the venture through in-film promotions but were unsuccessful at their attempt. As a result of the delays, it became difficult for the original set of actors to work together as they had full-time roles in different cities across India. Sudhish chose to start the film from scratch with a new set of actors, with the decision forcing Abbas to opt out of an acting role in the film. Among the notable new actors who joined the film were theatre actor Sunil Vishnu and video jockey Paloma Rao. Actor Madhavan also shot for a cameo for the final scene in the film. Made at a budget of 3 lakh rupees, it was the first independent digital film to be shot and released digitally in India.

== Release ==
The film premiere was held at the South India Film Chamber of Commerce to coincide with the 4th Chennai International Film Festival in Chennai, with two back-to-back screenings, the first of which was attended by film personalities, including actor Suriya, on 21 December 2006. It later had a limited release in Chennai in February 2007, where it ran for one show a day for three weeks at Sathyam Cinemas. The film was later released in Mumbai during September 2007, following screenings at film festivals in Bangladesh and Singapore.
