= Dirty Fellow =

Indian romantic action drama film

- Theatrical release poster
- Directed by: Adari Murthy Sai
- Written by: Adari Murthy Sai
- Produced by: G.S. Babu
- Starring: Santhi Chandra; Simrithi Bathija; Nikkesha Rangwala; D Deepika Singh
- Cinematography: Rama Krishna S
- Edited by: J.P
- Music by: Dr. P. Satish Kumar
- Production company: Raj India Entertainments
- Release date: 30 May 2024
- Country: India
- Language: Telugu

Dirty Fellow is a 2024 Indian Telugu-language romantic action drama film written and directed by Adari Murthy Sai. The film stars Santhi Chandra and Simrithi Bathija in lead roles.

== Cast ==
- Santhi Chandra as Shatru
- Simrithi Bathija as Chitra
- Nikkesha Rangwala as Saira
- D Deepika Singh as Raga
- Nagineedu
- Sathya Prakash
- Kumanan
- FM Babai
- Jayasri
- Pooja

== Production ==
The film was produced by G.S. Babu under the banner of Raj India Entertainments. The cinematography was done by Rama Krishna S while editing was handled by J.P and music composed by Dr. P. Satish Kumar.

== Reception ==
Avad Mohammad of OTTPlay rated two pint five out of five and wrote that "Dirty Fellow is a film with a mafia setup and mostly new faces. Though the film starts on an odd note and has a few over-the-top moments, the twists and turns keep us engaged from time to time."

Hindustan Times critic rated two point five out of five and wrote that "Filmmaking, cinematography and music are all fine. Shanti Chandra, an Indian Navy soldier, can be said to have entertained as a hero."
