= LSD - Love, Scandal and Doctors =

Hindi-language medical thriller

- Genre: Mystery; Thriller
- Written by: Palki Malhotra, Prakriti Mukherjee; Sumrit Shahi
- Directed by: Sattwik Mohanty; Preya Hirji; Saqib Pandor
- Starring: Rahul Dev, Punit J Pathak; Ishaan A Khanna Ayush Shrivastava; Siddharth Menon; Neha Hinge
- Country of origin: India
- Original language: Hindi
- No. of seasons: 1
- No. of episodes: 15 (list of episodes)

Production
- Executive producer: Ekta Kapoor
- Producer: Balaji Telefilms
- Production location: India
- Cinematography: Mohana Krishna; T. Surendra Reddy
- Editor: Sumedh Jagtap
- Running time: 17 to 23 mins

Original release
- Network: ZEE5, ALTBalaji
- Release: 5 February 2021

LSD - Love, Scandal & Doctors is an Indian Hindi-language medical thriller web series that is streaming digitally on ALTBalaji and ZEE5 from 5 February 2021. The writers of the series are Palki Malhotra, Prakriti Mukherjee and Sumrit Shahi while it has been directed by Sattwik Mohanty, Preya Hirji, and Saqib Pandor. Produced by Ekta Kapoor under the production company Balaji Telefilms. Web series stars Rahul Dev, Punit Pathak, Ishaan A Khanna, Siddharth Mennon, Ayush Shrivastava and Neha Hinge in lead roles. It is the story of the medical profession with power, nepotism, sexual politics and the competition.

== Synopsis ==
It is a story of 5 interns at the leading teaching hospital KMRC who are going to find the ugly truth the hard way. They have to traverse their internship under a strict murder investigation.

== Cast ==
- Rahul Dev as Dr. Rana
- Punit J Pathak as Inspector Tavish Singh
- Ishaan A Khanna as Dr Kartik Rana
- Siddharth Mennon as Dr Vikramjeet Bedi
- Tanaya Sachdeva as Dr Sara Borade
- Srishti Rindhani as Dr Rahima Mansurie
- Ayush Shrivastava as Dr Kabir
- Neha Hinge as Dr Chitra Rana
- Ashmita Jaggi as Dr Samkeesha
- Ujjwal Gauraha as Lawyer
- Pulkit Makol as Asif Mansurie
- Manish Pant as Assistant Inspector Dinesh Kohli
- Surabhi Tiwari as Mona
- Riva Arora as Rhea
- Ravi Chhabra

== Release date ==
ALTBalaji and ZEE5 have released this web series on 5 February 2021.

== Episodes ==
No. overall	No. in season	Title	Directed by	Written by	Original release date
1	1	"Licence to Kill"	Sattwik Mohanty, Preya Hirji, Saqib Pandor	Palki Malhotra, Prakriti Mukherjee, Sumrit Shahi	5 February 2021
Five interns One dead body, are they doctors or killers? Five interns Karthik, Vikram, Sara, Rahima and Kabir begin their lives as young medical interns at the prestigious KMRC hospital, where they realise friends are not forever and competition is a bitch and so is being medical interns... Sara targets Karthik because she needs to be the girl on top but oh damn guess who’s his daddy?? ohh and also trouble to hide a dead body.
2	2	"Deja Chu"	Sattwik Mohanty, Preya Hirji, Saqib Pandor	Palki Malhotra, Prakriti Mukherjee, Sumrit Shahi	5 February 2021
Past is fast catching up with the present as dead seldom stays buried. Timelines criss-cross between past and present as Secrets are unearthed and toxic chemistries abound. Tensions run high and so does the heavy load of being interns who are supposed to work around the clock as they land up a huge rave party bust and several underage OD patients, We realize how within 11 months the dynamics are completely shaken up within the five; and then what (who) they thought was dead and buried rears its ugly head as a top cop gets a whiff and gets on their tail. How long can they hide from the law?
3	3	"The Investigation"	Sattwik Mohanty, Preya Hirji, Saqib Pandor	Palki Malhotra, Prakriti Mukherjee, Sumrit Shahi	5 February 2021
As we again criss-cross between past and present, we see how Karthik and Sara become enemies with benefit from being just official enemies, and Vik starts feeling sidelined. In the present, An informal questioning by the Cops shakes up the five; as they realize they are on the verge of being busted for the "murder". A quick pact is made to stick to the stories and cover each others ass, however, Sara makes a faux pas and accidentally botches up the questioning. We realize the person "murdered" was actually Rahima's husband could there be more to the story? and what did the cop mean when he asked Sara if she knew Aasif well?? Yes Aasif the guy they supposedly murdered, Rahima's husband Aasif, a guy dead but haunting their careers now if they don't find a way soon to get out of it; and now Sara's one mistake can screw them up really bad... but why is Vik feeling that he will be the one caught?? What is he hiding?.
4	4	"Game On"	Sattwik Mohanty, Preya Hirji, Saqib Pandor	Palki Malhotra, Prakriti Mukherjee, Sumrit Shahi	5 February 2021
We see how in the past Vik had a huge problem with Sara and Karthik's toxic "situationship", and how even in the present Vik is convinced Sara is going to fuck them over for her own gains, Karthik however disagrees, we find the best friends in the past, in loggerheads in the present as clearly, Vik feels Sara is responsible for alienating Karthik from him and to top it all Karthik's I-need-to-win-at-all-costs attitude is weighing heavy on everything as Vik questions his loyalties and conscience. We delve into Vik's infatuation with Karthik's older sister and Chief resident Chitra and Chitra's past baggage with her father the dean of KMRC, Dr Rana. On one hand, in the past, we see how Vik rises up to Karthik's dominance in the leaderboard for Intern of the month and how in the present they are stuck with a breaking disaster when they get to know that cops have taken Rahima for interrogation. Will Rahima spill the beans on what really happened?
5	5	"Murder Revealed"	Sattwik Mohanty, Preya Hirji, Saqib Pandor	Palki Malhotra, Prakriti Mukherjee, Sumrit Shahi	5 February 2021
On one hand, Rahima is given an offer by the cops to confess and give in the people who helped her, where on the other hand we delve into the past how Karthik seemingly backstabbed Vik by taking a surgery meant for him and on the other hand Rahima and Sara have an altercation regarding Rahima's husband. We tease how in the past Rahima was always super mysterious about her relationship with her husband and finally reveal that actually, Aasif was a kinky manipulative man who had Rahima under his thumb, ruthless and bordering on abusive, we realize what Rahima had been going through, but does it mean she did kill her husband or made the rest of interns kill him for her?? Just as Rahima excuses herself and stands by her vow to her friends by not giving them up, Aasif's dead body is finally found! Now how will they get away with it!
6	6	"The Pressure"	Sattwik Mohanty, Preya Hirji, Saqib Pandor	Palki Malhotra, Prakriti Mukherjee, Sumrit Shahi	5 February 2021
As Aasif’s body is taken for postmortem, an official murder investigation is launched that shakes up the interns as they realize that they are running out of time! Rahima is suspended, as the interns despite their differences stick together with her. We see how in the past Karthik wins Intern of the Month because of the surgery he "stole" from Vik; Vik had confronted Karthik’s father the dean, Dr Rana because it wasn’t that Karthik backstabbed him BUT Dr Rana who favoured his own son and gave him the surgery. We see how in the past despite problems Vik and Karthik had come back together, but NOW in the present, they seem FURTHER apart. We see how in the past, Vik had chanced upon an abusive Aasif with Rahima and then Aasif was admitted into KMRC as a patient. Big revelation as we show for the first time that all five were present when Aasif was seemingly killed. The five despite their problems vow to stick together as interrogation is about to begin, NO ONE apart from them should KNOW what happened. However, we soon realize there is more to the story as we reveal Rahima as having an affair with another woman, who is none other than Dr Sam, who is KMRC's psychiatrist in chief and Dr Chitra best friend!! What more is Rahima hiding?? Did she manipulate the interns to kill Aasif for her and Sam??
7	7	"Sex, drugs and rock and jhol"	Sattwik Mohanty, Preya Hirji, Saqib Pandor	Palki Malhotra, Prakriti Mukherjee, Sumrit Shahi	5 February 2021
We start on a note of disdain, Vik is doing drugs now, and we see him dabbling his conscience to take it or not as he fiddles with a bottle of opioid fentanyl; from Vik's POV we go into that day when everything changed! The party that was the nail on the coffin that was Vik and Karthik's friendship and the day they all had met Aasif for the first time. We see how Karthik is high on winning yet another intern of the month and how this time again he has stolen an opportunity from Vik but this time instead of understanding Vik and Karthik get into a spat. Meanwhile, we see Sam and Rahima fresh in love and hiding it from everyone, when Aasif crashes the party and rubs everyone the wrong way as we will later reveal. From Karthik to Vik to Kabir to Sam everyone was pissed off with him, however, Sara and he were another story! We cut back to the present as we delve with that if everyone had a motive to kill him, who it really was, when we find out from our main cop Inspector Dhruv that Aasif didn't die with the blunt force trauma BUT because he ODed on Opioid fentanyl!!! The interns are shaken because till now THEY themselves believed they killed Aasif accidentally BUT now it dawns on them that someone else was involved because if Aasif was dozed with an opioid that MEANS someone really wanted him DEAD! But the question isn't just WHO but ALSO WHY!?
8	8	"The Secret"	Sattwik Mohanty, Preya Hirji, Saqib Pandor	Palki Malhotra, Prakriti Mukherjee, Sumrit Shahi	5 February 2021
We build Vik as a red herring in this episode, as we connect his opioid addiction with the possibility that he killed Aasif after all Vik has been shady about his involvement from the start and kept feeling he will be screwed. We delve into Vik's past as it catches up with him when he's dead beat MIA father reappears in his life but not alone, not only is his father back for treatment but also has a much younger GF and seems to really care about her. Vik is in deep turmoil, not only has he lost his best friend but also his only hope his father has come back and dashed his expectations about why he left in the first place! Here, Karthik is trying to tie loose ends as he confronts each one if they had a motive and we reveal what exactly happened in the party between each of them with Aasif however no one comes clean and we realize that some secrets are not worth giving upon. We see how Aasif had abused and beaten up Kabir, threatened Vik to expose his relationship with Chitra and tried to act fresh with Sara and gotten into an altercation with Karthik, however, Sara had given him a benefit of doubt because she "understood" his kind people, the damaged ones that everyone gives up on! Sara tells Karthik that Vik is acting shady and Karthik finally confronts Vik and finds out what he has been going through! Karthik despite his anger with Vik, puts his ego aside for the first time and holds onto Vik and tells him he believes him but he has to let go of the drugs. Here, we reveal that the person stealing opioid from the hospital's lab was none than Sara and finally we find the drugs in Karthik's drawer. Was Karthik playing along till now just to save Sara or is there more to the story?
9	9	"Criminals or Victims?"	Sattwik Mohanty, Preya Hirji, Saqib Pandor	Palki Malhotra, Prakriti Mukherjee, Sumrit Shahi	5 February 2021
Karthik confronts Sara about the drugs but Sara is a closed vault, who decides to distract Karthik with what she knows best. Seducing him. Karthik is conflicted about Sara and feeling the heat that if he doesn’t find out what Sara is up to, Vik will be in danger. We delve into the past when Aasif was a patient in KMRC when Chitra and the other doctors were trying to figure out what was wrong with his kidneys. We see how Aasif through his stay in the ward tormented not just Rahima but also Kabir! However, Sara was finding more reasons to not hate Aasif as the more she got to know him she felt he was misunderstood. Meanwhile, we hint at Kabir's changing personality as he starts appearing more distant and a secret he has hidden for so long about himself starts to reveal itself. Here Karthik and Vik have a fight over Sara as Vik tells Karthik that he is sure that Sara is trying to fuck us all over and that's when Sara decides that it's time she lets her guards down and finally tell them why she was stealing the drugs in the first place! We reveal Sara's toxic drug addict mother and the reason why she was stealing fentanyl and giving to her, the boys realize that the strong bitchy Sara also has a vulnerability but Sara being Sara would NEVER take a look of sympathy and tells them both to shove it and never speak about it. Meanwhile, we reveal how Aasif had discovered Sam and Rahima's affair and was livid and even threatened to end their careers. We reveal in the end how a nurse had been injecting Aasif with fentanyl all this while on Dr Sam's orders!! Was Sam the killer all along??
10	10	"The Cat & The Mouse Chase"	Sattwik Mohanty, Preya Hirji, Saqib Pandor	Palki Malhotra, Prakriti Mukherjee, Sumrit Shahi	5 February 2021
We reveal for the audience how on the day Aasif died, he had attacked Rahima and in self-defence, the interns had tried to fight him off, but because he was so drugged and manic by the time Vik dealt him the last blow, Aasif was already dead, which none of the five was aware of! Sara introspects in guilt that what if they were framed to cover up the actual murder, which was supposed to be OD and whom else, but Rahima to have a motive?? Sara wonders were they played to kill an innocent man who became a monster under the influence of the drugs?? The five who seemed united suddenly have a reason to doubt each other! Meanwhile, we reveal Kabir's other side, that he cross-dresses in secret and when the cops raid his house he loses his cool and we see a side we have never seen before! What else was Kabir hiding? Meanwhile, Sara Vik and Karthik trying to snoop on Rahima stumble upon the mother of all revelations that Rahima and Sam are lovers!!! Sara is sure this is motive enough to kill, after all, Aasif was a thorn in their love story and only his death could pave a way for Rahima and Sam's love to materialize!! On the other hand, we see glimpses of Kabir's traumatic past were as a child who liked to dress up as women (very clearly gay), was beaten up brutally by his own father to pray the gay away! Kabir is showing signs of PTSD as post his abuse by Aasif all his past traumas have woken up! Here, Vik hints to Chitra about Sam's possible motive and finds that Chitra would never throw her best friend under the bus without knowing exactly what she did! Vik and Chitra on crossroads. Here Sara Karthik Vik ambush Rahima and Sam and confront them, as conflict heats up Vik makes an anonymous call to the cops about Sam and Rahima's affair, but just then Sam realizes along with everyone else when the nurse tells them that she never gave Aasif the last doze!!! They are all shocked that if Sam's doze didn’t kill Aasif, there was someone else, someone with a motive much bigger, someone who didn’t just want Aasif out of the way BUT also wanted to frame Dr Sam!! The interns realize the shit is deeper than ever and now the cops are coming for Dr Sam thanks to Vik's reckless phone call!
11	11	"The Revelation"	Sattwik Mohanty, Preya Hirji, Saqib Pandor	Palki Malhotra, Prakriti Mukherjee, Sumrit Shahi	5 February 2021
As we delve into the genesis of Sam and Rahima's love story, we find the cops grilling Dr Sam about her alleged affair with Rahima and a motive that finally made sense to the cops. Meanwhile, we reveal how on the day Aasif died, he had blackmailed Vik to sneak him out of KMRC, he looked manic and scared as Vik thinks back now, what was he hiding and who was he scared of? Chitra confronts her father and pleads with him to save her best friend Sam, but Dr Rana stoic as ever tells her nothing comes before the prestige of the hospital and we cannot stand by a person who is an alleged murderer and adulterer. As each person is dealing with their own demons, and emotions run high, Karthik gets the shock of his life as he discovers Vik and Chitra's affair. Everything aside this was the ultimate betrayal of bro code that Vik was having an affair with his older sister!! On the other hand, the cops have a surprise guest, as Kabir comes to the cop station and confesses to killing Aasif!!
12	12	"The Big Bang"	Sattwik Mohanty, Preya Hirji, Saqib Pandor	Palki Malhotra, Prakriti Mukherjee, Sumrit Shahi	5 February 2021
We unravel non-linear, as we find a tensed Kabir who is running away from the police station and meets with an accident. We cut between past and present as we reveal that Kabir believed he killed Aasif by causing his OD!! We go back into Kabir's past with Aasif and reveal his toxic attraction with his own abuser that led him to supply cocaine to Aasif. Naive Kabir believed he killed Aasif as the cops tell him that he didn't however in the process he ends up outing himself as Gay and when the cops tell them they will speak to his family when he loses his medical licence, Kabir panics and runs into an accident. Meanwhile, Karthik is fuming with Vik's betrayal, his relationship with Chitra is non-negotiable to him. Vik and Karthik break into a brawl, which is brought to a halt when a severe road accident is brought to the hospital. Kabir had banged his car into a motorcycle and now two young boys, who were best friends, are impaled on a rod fighting for their lives! Kabir back in KMRC is shit scared he would be ousted and his father would kill him, the fear of humiliations weighing heavy on him. Meanwhile, Karthik and Vik in spite of their differences have to attend to the impaled patients that brings out their own bitter turmoil as two ex-best friends operate on two dying best friends and it brings out the worst in them as they realize they can never be the same again! Their friendship has to be "amputated"! Here, cops to KMRC with an arrest warrant, as everybody thinks it's for Kabir. Kabir is nervous and scared and runs to the terrace, where the cops arrest VIKRAM!!! Because the cops received an anonymous tip about where the "murder" weapon was hidden!! As the cops escort Vik out of KMRC, Kabir jumps from the terrace!.
13	13	"The Death"	Sattwik Mohanty, Preya Hirji, Saqib Pandor	Palki Malhotra, Prakriti Mukherjee, Sumrit Shahi	5 February 2021
As Kabir fights between life and death, Vik is put behind bars. The cop tells Vik indirectly that it was Karthik who gave him up. Vik is gutted. Meanwhile, Sara and Karthik have a conflict as Sara feels Karthik was unfair to throw Vik under the bus and also the fact that their friend Kabir was pushed by someone and it wasn’t just suicide. Dr Chitra bails Vik out to see Kabir one last time. Here the cops reveal that Kabir's last words when he fell down were "Aasif and Sara", as Sara comes back under suspicion. Kabir dies while Sara is taken into custody for interrogation for Kabir's alleged murder!! With Sara behind bars, Karthik Vik on an un-mendable break, Chitra Sam and Vik realize that Sara was definitely not behind Kabir's murder, but Kabir was definitely murdered and that means whoever killed Kabir was possibly also behind Aasif’s murder!! Who could it be!
14	14	"The Truth"	Sattwik Mohanty, Preya Hirji, Saqib Pandor	Palki Malhotra, Prakriti Mukherjee, Sumrit Shahi	5 February 2021
Karthik wants Sara out and helplessly asks for Vik's help who disses him, out of options Karthik turns to his father who promises to help. Meanwhile, Sara helps in inmate in an emergency and is rushed to KMRC. Sam on the other hand gets a blast from the past as she decides to come clean to Chitra about her biggest secret and a possible motive. We delve into the day Kabir was pushed from the terrace and retrace steps to reveal that the last person to see Kabir was Dr Rana! Sam comes clean to Chitra about her affair with Dr Rana many years ago and how she kept quiet all this while, but now she feels Dr Rana is responsible for both the deaths! BIG REVELATION.
15	15	"The Finale"	Sattwik Mohanty, Preya Hirji, Saqib Pandor	Palki Malhotra, Prakriti Mukherjee, Sumrit Shahi	5 February 2021
Chitra and Sam decide to lay a trap to squeeze a confession out of Dr Rana, As Chitra confronts her father and gets the first-hand account of his dirty laundry. Rana confesses to killing Aasif and accidentally pushing Kabir. Meanwhile, Sam tells the cops that they have to arrest Rana and force him into an interrogation. Just as it seems all will be well; and when cops come to arrest Rana, a shocker changes the course of events as Chitra surprisingly posts a video of confession taking all charges on her head!! Vik, Sara Karthik and the cops are shocked as they realize that this isn't just a confession but a suicide attempt! We see Chitra surrounding herself with pills getting ready to kill herself; as Vik desperately tries to break the door open. Karthik can't believe what his sister has done as Rana strategically tells Karthik after she is her mother's daughter and just like her mother instead of facing her crimes she is killing herself. Sara finds herself looking at Karthik as just like Rana as she holds onto Vik who is desperate to save his love. Is this the end of Chitra? Will Rana get away with everything?? What did Rana tell Chitra to make her do this to herself??

== Reception ==
=== Critical reviews ===
Joginder Tuteja on Rediff.com has given 4/5 stars ratings applauding that it will keep engrossed right through, with the needle of suspicion move to every character in the story. All the actors have played their role well. The writing and dialogues of the web series are good and there were no unwanted scenes. Further criticized that "When the core story works, everything else is secondary, and this holds true in the case of LSD"

Ronak Kotecha of The Times of India Review team has given 3/5 stars rating stating that it is a worth watching with a healthy dose of entertainment and fascination. With young doctors in action it is a high on adrenaline. The series has no dull moment and actors have given justice to their roles. Some of them couldn't make it through, however, all the women actors were in characters compare it to men. Loud background score, unwanted abuses and the constant back and forth in the timeline could have been avoided.

Apoorv Shandilya from Xappie has given 3/5 stars rating saying that doctors can skip this show as it is fiction based story, while others can watch it for one time at least. Criticized that Rahul Dev performance steal the show and story made more appealing. On the negative front, he stated that "The relationship between young interns and senior doctors within the hospital is made increasingly hostile just to please the show’s story". During the pandemic situation this isn't the good time to release a show that portrays doctors in the light of evil murderers.

Pakaao has given 3.5/stars rating for this web series stating it is good show with plot and execution. Script pace was high from the beginning till the end and dialogues were very good. Acting by Siddharth Menon, Tanaya Sachdeva and Rahul Dev were good. Music, Cinematography, Special Effects, Editing team and directors has done a good job.
