= Mehak Manwani =

Indian actress (born 1996)

- Born: 4 December 1996 (age 29)
- Occupations: Actress, Model
- Years active: 2013–2022

Mehak Manwani (born 4 December 1996) is an Indian television and film actress who appears in Bollywood films. She made her debut in Bollywood with the film Sixteen (2013). She has also done a cameo role in the Bollywood movie Fukrey (2013) as Lali's girl. She was seen in the popular daily soap Sasural Genda Phool.

== Filmography ==
=== Films ===
Year	Title	Role	Notes	Ref.
2013	Sixteen	Nidhi		
2013	Fukrey	Lali's girl		
2020	Doordarshan	Twinkle		
2022	Bhool Bhulaiyaa 2	Trisha Thakur		

=== Television ===
Year	Title	Role	Notes	Ref.
2011	Sasural Genda Phool	Mehak		
2016	Life Lafde Aur Bandiyan	Tiny Bhalla		

=== Web series ===
Year	Title	Role	Notes	Ref.
2022	Jholachhap	Dr. Neha Rastogi		
