= Haq Se =

Indian Hindi web series

- Genre: Drama
- Created by: Manor Rama Pictures
- Based on: Little Women by Louisa May Alcott
- Developed by: Manor Rama Pictures
- Written by: Devika Bhagat
- Directed by: Ken Ghosh
- Creative director: Nimisha Pandey
- Starring: Surveen Chawla; Parul Gulati; Rajeev Khandelwal
- Theme music composer: Raju Singh
- Composer: Raju Singh
- Country of origin: India
- Original language: Hindi
- No. of seasons: 1
- No. of episodes: 20

Production
- Producers: Viraj Kapur; Karan Raj Kohli
- Production location: Kashmir, India
- Cinematography: Anubhav Bansal
- Editor: Shlok Bhandari
- Camera setup: Multi-camera
- Running time: 18-25 minutes
- Production company: Manor Rama Pictures LLP

Original release
- Network: JioHotstar
- Release: 2 February 2018

Haq Se is an Indian Hindi web series, directed by Ken Ghosh and produced by Viraj Kapur, and Karan Raj Kohli. The series was released on 2 February 2018 on JioHotstar. The series stars Rajeev Khandelwal, Surveen Chawla and Parul Gulati.

The series is available for streaming on the JioHotstar App and its associated networks since its release date.

== Plot ==
The series revolves around four blood-bound sisters with four dreams, all yearning for one thing: fulfillment. It is a modern-day story of dreams, desires, love, war and the pursuit of happiness, set against the beauty and unrest of Kashmir.

Life changed for Meher, Jannat, Bano, and Amal when their father's medicine factory was burnt in a riot. Their father was forced to leave for Siachen as an Army's doctor to cater to his family's needs. With military, political, and religious tension mounting by the moment, these girls are fighting hard to keep their passions alive.

Meher is a young and sensible woman who is working as a pediatric intern under Dr.Naushad Rizvi, a single father. In the past, she was in love with someone. But for unknown reasons, the relationship failed. Therefore, she is very critical of love. Dr. Naushad Rizvi is a strict doctor who has zero interest in love. His wife left him for another man and since then he has been single-handedly raising his daughter Aliya. Jannat is a passionate and aggressive feminist, who writes for a newspaper by day and is an anonymous blogger by night. Bano is a calm and sensitive musician, who aspires to break the restrictions placed upon her by the society. Amal is a beautiful but hyperactive and rude girl who aspires to become an actress.

== Cast ==
- Parul Gulati as Jannat Mirza
- Surveen Chawla as Dr. Meher Mirza
- Rajeev Khandelwal as Dr. Naushad Rizvi
- Aanchal Sharma as Bahira Mirza
- Nikkesha as Amal Mirza
- Rukhsar Rehman as Rabiyah Mirza
- Simone Singh as Fatima Khala
- Pavail Gulati as Tabish "Azi" Azad
- Karanvir Sharma as Raghu Thapar
- Ravi Khemu as Hashim Mirza
