= Glamanand Supermodel India 2021 =

- Date: 21 August 2021
- Presenters: Simran Ahuja; Aayushi Dholakia
- Venue: Kingdom of Dreams, Gurugram, India
- Director: Nikhil Anand
- Producer: Glamanand Group
- Sponsor: Glamanand Group, Toothsi
- Entrants: 24
- Placements: 15
- Winner: Zoya Afroz
- Congeniality: Hannah Tamalapakula
- Photogenic: Disha Shamwani

Glamanand Supermodel India 2021 was the seventh edition of Glamanand Supermodel India contest. The event took place on August 21, 2021, at Kingdom of Dreams, in Gurugram, India. At the conclusion of the event, Simrithi Bathija crowned Zoya Afroz as the new Miss India International. At the same event, Divija Gambhir was crowned Miss India Multinational 2021 and Tanya Sinha was crowned Miss India Globe International.

== Final results ==
Color keys

- The contestant Won in an International pageant.
- The contestant was a Runner-up in an International pageant.
- The contestant was a Semi-Finalist in an International pageant.
- Unplaced

Final Results	Candidate	International Placement
Miss International India 2021	Zoya Afroz	Unplaced
Miss Multinational India 2021	Divija Gambhir	TBD
Miss Globe India 2021	Tanya Sinha	Not compete
Miss Tourism India 2021	Asmita Chakraborty	Unplaced
2nd Runner-up	Anisha Sharma	
Top 8	Archana Ravi; Arushi Singh; Disha Shamwani	
Top 15	Aishwarya Dikshit; Megha Jhulka; Megha Shetty; Saachi Gurav; Shalini Rana; Sejal Renake; Tanu Shree	

=== Special awards ===
Award	Winner
Beauty For a Cause	Divija Gambhir
Beauty with Brains	Aishwarya Dikshit
Best In Evening Gown	Zoya Afroz
Best In Swimsuit	Tanya Sinha
Best In Fitness	Arushi Singh
Best In National Costume	Divija Gambhir
Best In Personal Interview	Saachi Gurav
Best In Ramp Walk	Arushi Singh
Best In Speech	Asmita Chakraborty
Best In Sports	Shalini Rana
Best In Talent	Aishwarya Dikshit
Miss Beautiful Skin	Disha Shamwani
Miss Beautiful Smile	Shalini Rana
Miss Body Beautiful	Divija Gambhir
Miss Congeniality	Hannah Tamalapakula
Miss Environment	Disha Shamwani
Miss Fashion Icon	Disha Shamwani
Miss Glamorous	Annu Bhati
Miss Glamorous Eyes	Zoya Afroz
Miss Iron Maiden	Saachi Gurav
Miss Photogenic	Disha Shamwani
Miss Popular	Archana Ravi
Top Model	Zoya Afroz

=== Judges ===
- Kartikeya Arora – editor in chief TMM magazine
- Maya Sagi – fashion designer
- Dr. Amit Karkhanis – Dermatologist and Founder Dr Tvacha
- Yashraj Tongia – former director DGCA and businessman
- Rekha Vohra – social activist and holistic trainer
- Simrithi Bathija – Miss International India 2019
- Tanvi Malhara – Miss Multinational India 2019
- Dr. Varun Katyal – nutritionist and wellness expert
- Rajiv Srivastava – founder Act Now
- Nikhil Anand – founder/ Chairman of Glamanand

== Candidates ==
Below is the list of candidates that competed at the competition. • Zoya Afroz • Archana Ravi • Aishwarya Dikshit • Naina Vijay Sharma • Tanya Sinha • Sejal Renake • Himani Gaikwad • Megha Shetty • Megha Julka • Deeksha Narang • Shivani Tak • Saachi Gurav • Asmita Chakraborty • Tanu Shree • Shweta Shinde • Hannah Tamalapakula • Susang Sherpa • Disha Shamwani • Isha Vaidya • Annu Bhati • Arushi Singh • Divija Gambhir • Shalini Rana • Anisha Sharma
