= Zoya Afroz =

Indian actress, fashion model and beauty queen (born 1994)

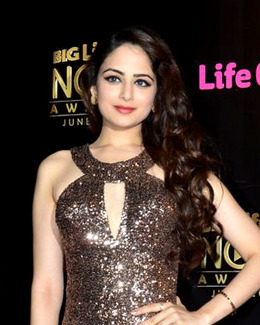
- Afroz at the 20th Screen Awards, 2014
- Born: 10 January 1994 (age 32); Lucknow, Uttar Pradesh, India
- Education: Mithibai College, Mumbai
- Occupations: Actor; fashion model; beauty pageant titleholder
- Years active: 1997–present
- Height: 1.70 m (5 ft 7 in)
- Title: Femina Miss India 2013 (2nd-runner up); Miss India International 2021 (Winner); Miss International 2022 (Unplaced)

Zoya Afroz (born 10 January 1994) is an Indian actress, model and a beauty pageant titleholder. She won the title of Miss India International, competing at the Glamanand Supermodel India 2021 contest and represented India at the Miss International 2022 beauty pageant in Japan. She was previously crowned as the second runner-up at Femina Miss India 2013. Her first appearance was as a child artist in the television series Kora Kagaz in 1998 and continued to do so in films Hum Saath Saath Hain (1999), Mann (1999) and Kuch Naa Kaho (2003). In 2014, Afroz made her Bollywood screen debut as an adult in the thriller film The Xposé, which emerged as a commercial success. Afroz has also worked in various television commercials since she was a child artist.

Afroz promotes education for girls and offers help to women in marginalised sections in acquiring financial independence. She works towards aiding women to acquire basic knowledge and supports the rights of women to get equal opportunity.

== Early life and education ==
Originally hailing from Gorakhpur, Uttar Pradesh, Zoya Afroz was born in Lucknow, Uttar Pradesh, to Shadaab and Saleha Afroz. She started working in Indian films, television series and commercials since the age of three. She attended R N Shah High School in Mumbai. She subsequently attended Mithibai College in Vile Parle, Mumbai, where she acquired her Bachelor of Commerce degree.

== Career ==
=== 1998–2005: (Beginnings) ===
Afroz started her career when she was 3 years old. She got her break from the Rasna-sponsored Mahasearch Contest at the age of 3, after which she was featured in a commercial for the same. She appeared in the television series Kora Kagaz in 1998. She was spotted by Rajshri Productions and was offered a role in Hum Saath Saath Hain (1999). She played the role of Neelam Kothari's daughter in the film, which was a commercial and box-office success.

She later appeared in films like Mann (1999) and Kuch Naa Kaho (2003). She then acted in the children's fantasy adventure television series Son Pari. She played the role of young Goddess Parvati in DD National's series Jai Mata Ki which aired in the year 2000. As a child, she has appeared in television commercials for several brands like Whirlpool, Shoppers Stop, Jatt Airways and New York Life Insurance.

=== 2012–present ===
At the age of 17, she worked in a Punjabi movie titled Sadi Gali Aaya Karo (2012). As an adult, she made her Bollywood debut in 2014 film, The Xposé. Taran Adarsh described her role by stating: “The leading lady, Zoya Afroz [as Chandni], looks glamorous and had enacted her parts in the film with confidence”. She was later signed up in a Tamil movie titled Thamizhan Endru Sol, but the film was unreleased.

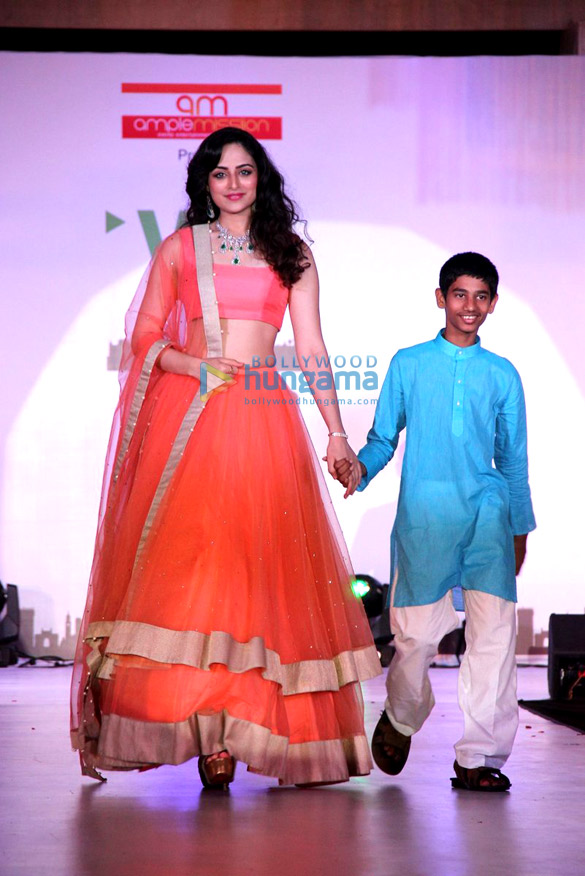
Zoya walks the ramp in 2015 for a Global Peace Initiative programme at the Welingkar School in Mumbai.

In 2017, Afroz appeared as a lead alongside Himansh Kohli in the film Sweetiee Weds NRI. She expressed - “I was waiting for such a film. So when it came, I grabbed it with both my hands. Earlier, the film I did has quite a serious role. This one is quite fun and I wanted to do something that could connect with the youth and I could play my age onscreen.” She worked in a Tamil film Paamban in 2019. She modelled for the 2020 edition of the annual Kingfisher Calendar in Western Cape, South Africa, and was featured in the March and June pages for the same. She was cast as a lead in the Hindi film Kabaad - The Coin, along with Vivaan Shah. The film was released digitally on 13 February 2021, on Voot. Afroz was signed up in a MX Player's thriller web show titled 'Matsya Kaand', and she will co-star alongside Ravi Dubey and Madhur Mittal. She was selected as a main cast in a spy thriller called 'Mukhbir - The Story of a Spy'.

Afroz has also been featured in television commercials and print ads for various brands and products, including Pond's, KFC, Asian Paints, Parliament Basmati Rice, OnePlus, LG, Maruti Suzuki Dzire Century Plyboards and Coca-Cola.

== Pageantry ==
=== Femina Miss India ===
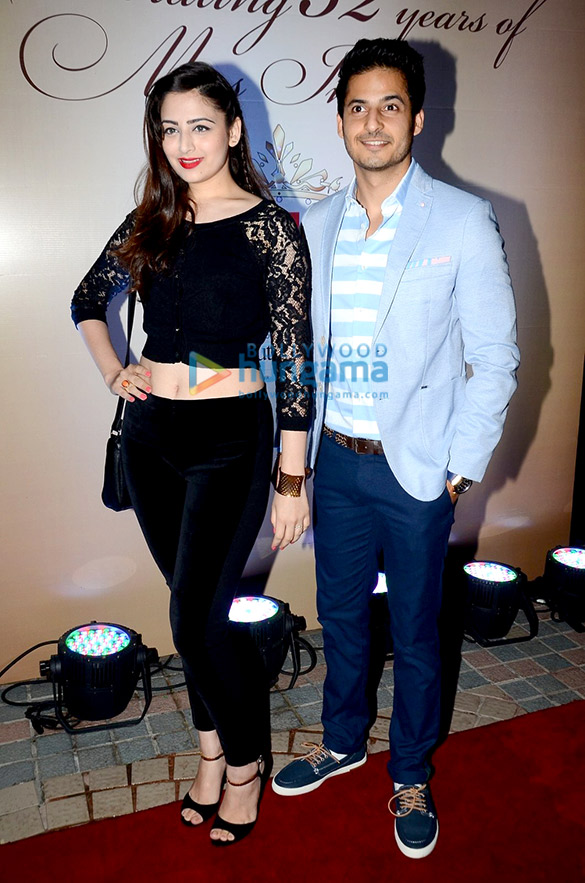
Afroz with Mohit Malhotra at Femina Miss India bash, in 2015

Afroz competed in the Femina Miss Indore 2013 contest at the age of 18, where she won the title. She acquired a direct entry as a contestant in the Femina Miss India 2013 pageant. At the end of the grand finale event held on 24 March 2013, in Yash Raj Studios, Mumbai, Afroz was crowned as the second runner-up by Rochelle Rao, Miss India International 2012 (and Top 15 of Miss International 2012).

Afroz was initially considered to represent India at Miss International 2013 by the Miss India Organization. However, subsequently when Miss Diva 2013 was organised, Gurleen Grewal, the edition's 1st runner-up was selected as Miss India International 2013.

=== Glamanand Supermodel India ===
Afroz competed in the 2021 edition of the Glamanand Supermodel India pageant. The grand finale event was held at the Kingdom of Dreams, Gurgaon, Haryana in NCR Delhi on 21 August 2021. There, she bagged three sub-titles, namely - Best in Evening Gown, Miss Glamorous Eyes and Top Model.

During the final question and answer round of Femina Miss India 2017, the top 5 delegates were asked the same question - “What is the role of a beauty pageant in a country that lacks unity?”, to which Afroz responded:

"As someone who has dreamt to be on stage of such a prestigious pageant, I believe that beauty pageants give great opportunities to young women to excel in their career, and in whichever field they choose to pursue. Beauty pageants recognises that and gives them wings to fly and strengthen and empower them. So, I believe that in our country where we have so much unity, yet so much diversity, a beauty pageant brings girls from different cultures all together, and they get so much to learn from each other, as opposed to the countries which lacks unity. I really feel that pageants helps women to reach their highest potential, and makes them united."

At the end of the event, she was crowned as Miss India International 2021, besting 23 other contestants. Thereby, she will represent India at the Miss International 2022 pageant to be held during the fall of 2022, in Yokohama City, Japan.

== Filmography ==
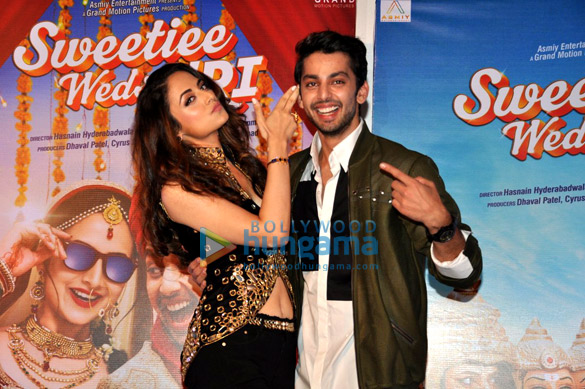
Zoya (left) with Himansh Kohli at a promotional event for Sweetiee Weds NRI in 2017.

Key
†	Denotes films that have not yet been released

=== Films ===
Year	Title	Role	Language	Notes	Ref.
1999	Hum Saath Saath Hain	Radhika	Hindi		
1999	Mann	Child Actor in School	Hindi		
2001	Sant Gyaneshwar	Mukta	Hindi		
2003	Kuch Naa Kaho	Aarya	Hindi		
2005	From Tia With Love	Tia	English		
2012	Sadi Gali Aaya Karo	Channo	Punjabi		
2014	The Xposé	Chandni Raza	Hindi		
2016	Thamizhan Endru Sol	Zoya	Tamil	Unreleased film	
2017	Sweetiee Weds NRI	Sweetie	Hindi		
2018	Sugar Free	Monica Tyagi	Hindi	Short film	
2021	Kabaad: The Coin	Roma	Hindi		
2024	Sikandar Ka Muqaddar	Tabassum	Hindi		

=== Television ===
Year	Title	Role	Notes	Ref.
1998	Kora Kagaz	Child Artist	As a child artist	
2000	Jai Mata Ki	Nanhi Mata / Young Parvati	As a child artist	
2001	Hum Saath Aath Hai	Lovely	As a child artist	
2004	Son Pari	Dimples	As a child artist	
2013	Femina Miss India 2013	Herself		
2014	Comedy Nights with Kapil	Herself - Guest	Episode 82	
2020	Kingfisher Calendar: The Making	Herself	Documentary series	
2021	Matsya Kaand	Urvashi	MX Player	
2022	Mukhbir - The Story of a Spy	Jamila	ZEE5	
2023	Fireflies: Parth Aur Jugnu	Nyasa	ZEE5	
2026	Taskaree	Priya Khubchandani	Netflix series	

=== Music Videos ===
Year	Title	Singer(s)	Label	Ref.
2021	Dil Lai La	Kulwinder Billa	Times Music	
2021	Rab Kare Tu Bhi	Yograj Koushal	Zee Music Company	
2021	Ferrari	Anamika	Koco 7 Productions	
2020	Galat Bande	R. Nait	White Hill Studios	
2020	Suno Na	Arko and Neeti Mohan	Gaana Originals	
2018	Raati Saanu	Gajendra Verma	Saga Music	

== Awards and nominations ==
Year	Award	Category	Film	Result	Ref.
2013	Bharat Ratna Dr Ambedkar Awards	Beauty Queen of the Year	N/A	Won	
2014	Life OK Screen Awards	Best Actress	"The Xposé"	Won	
