= Ankita Shorey =

Indian model and actress

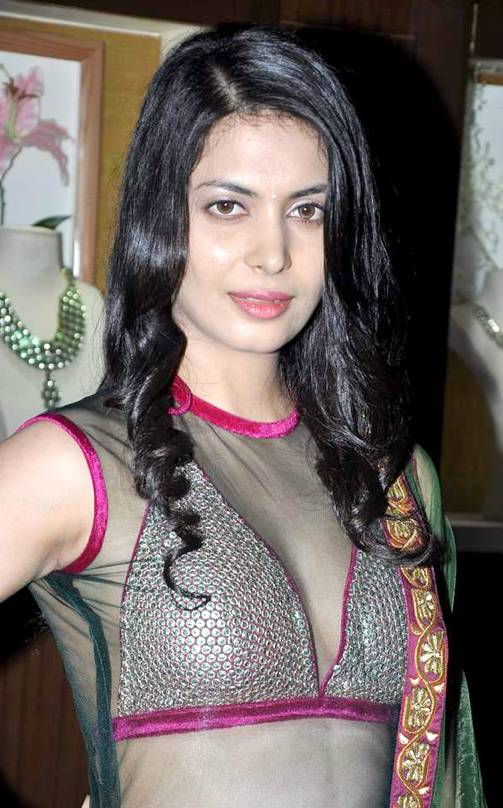
- Shorey in 2014
- Born: Jalandhar, Punjab, India
- Education: History Hons (Delhi university)
- Occupation: Model / Actor
- Beauty pageant titleholder
- Title: Femina Miss India International 2011
- No. of films: The World Before Her (Canadian Documentary)
- Years active: 2012- present
- Major competitions: Femina Miss India 2011 (Winner-Femina Miss India International); Miss International 2011 (Unplaced)

Ankita Shorey, is an Indian actress, model, and beauty pageant titleholder, who was crowned the Femina Miss International 2011, and represented India at the Miss International 2011. She was featured in the Canadian documentary: The World Before Her, presented by Anurag Kashyap, and was written and directed by Nisha Pahuja.

== Early life ==
Ankita Shorey was born to her father, Arun Shorey, and mother, Neelam Shorey.

== Career ==
Shorey worked as a brand ambassador for the jewelry brand Gitanjali Jewelry and few other brands.

=== Modelling ===
In 2012, Shorey walked various fashion shows, including Manish Malhotra's Mijwan Sonnets in Fabric as showopener and at India International Jewellery Week with Bipasha Basu.

She was the Brand Ambassador at Aamby Valley India Bridal Fashion Week 2012 for JJ Valaya and Tarun Tahiliani.

In 2013, Shorey walked for Rocky S at Lakme Fashion Week, Anju Modi at Wills Lifestyle India Fashion Week 2013, and Gitanjali Jewelry with Akshay Kumar and Sonakshi Sinha.

At the 2016 French European Indian Fashion Week, Shorey walked for Narendra Kumar.

=== Hosting ===
Shorey hosted the Filmfare award in 2012 with Ranbir Kapoor and Shahrukh Khan.

=== Films ===
Shorey signed up for a three-film deal with Bhushan Kumar and T-Series in 2013 of different genres.

Awards and achievements
Preceded by Neha Hinge	Miss International India; 2011	Succeeded by Rochelle Maria Rao
