= Keith Sequeira =

Indian actor (born 1980)

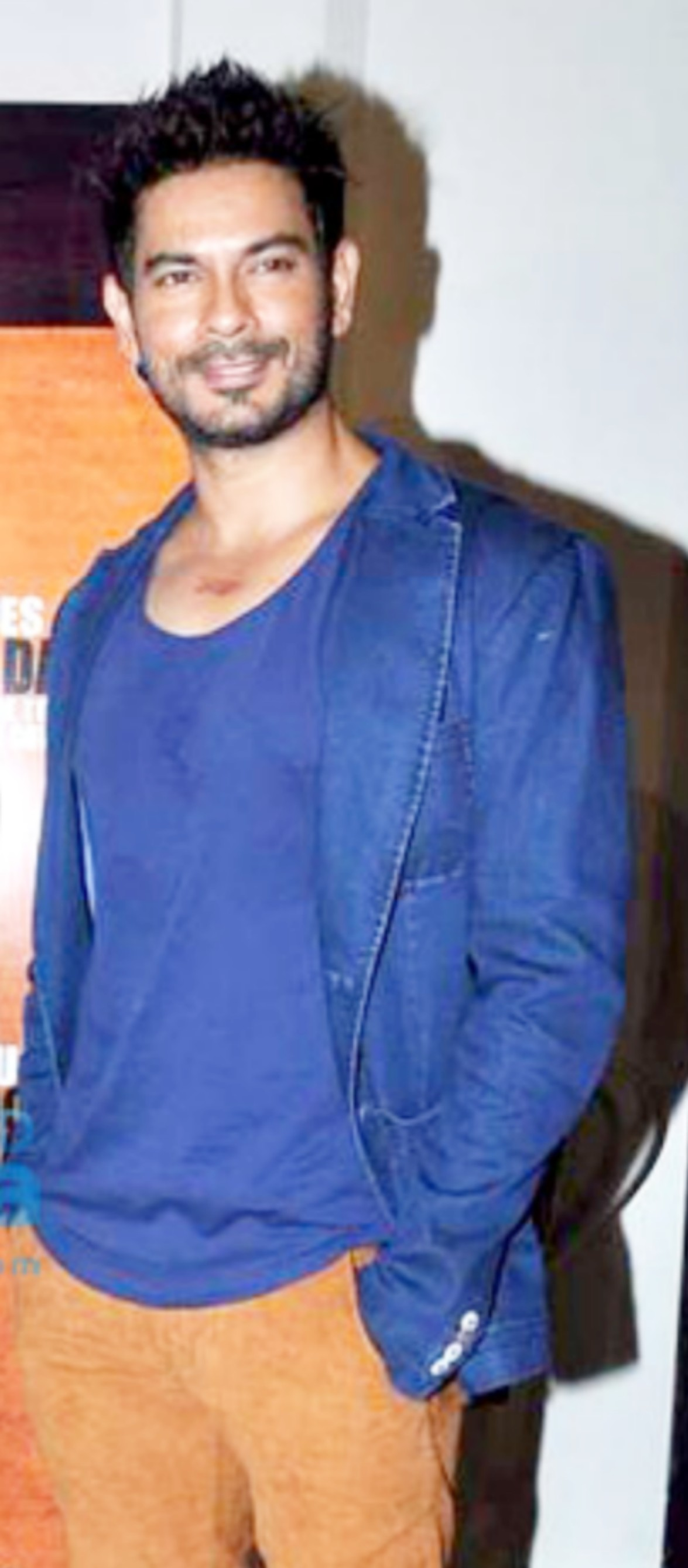
- Keith at the premiere of Sixteen in 2013
- Born: 30 April 1980 (age 46); Delhi, India
- Other name: VJ Keith
- Education: London College of Fashion
- Occupations: Actor, model, VJ, RJ
- Years active: 2001–present
- Known for: Bigg Boss 9
- Spouse: Samyuktha Singh (m. 2005; div. 2011) Rochelle Rao (m. 2018)

Keith Sequeira (born 30 April 1980) is an Indian actor, former model and VJ. He modeled for Raymond's The Complete Man campaign before gaining popularity as VJ Keith on B4U. He featured in the music video "Shake It Daddy" with Ayesha Takia and played the lead role in the soap opera Dekho Magar Pyaar Se on Star Plus. He made his movie debut with Sixteen (2013) and acted in Calendar Girls (2015). He was a contestant in the reality television show Bigg Boss 9.

== Early life and education ==
Sequeira was born on 30 April 1980, in Delhi, but his native place is in Goa.

Sequeira completed his schooling at St. Columba's School, and later earned degree in Economics. He then moved to London, where he studied fashion at the London College of Fashion. He was also actively involved in theatre during school and college days, laying the foundation for an acting career.

== Career ==
After returning from London, he involved in radio production work and brief work in event management.

=== Modelling and VJ ===
Sequeira modelled for Raymond's The Complete Man campaign. He then became a B4U VJ and hosted several shows, gaining popularity as "VJ Keith". He has also anchored several lifestyle shows on TV, including AXN’s Men 2.0, Thailand t-off, VH1's Club Class, live coverage of Super Fight League on Star Sports.

=== Movies and Television ===
Sequeira made his film debut with Sixteen directed by Raj Purohit in 2013. He also played Officer Roy in the television serial Diya Aur Baati Hum.

=== Bigg Boss 9 ===
Sequeira was among the fourteen contestants in the ninth season of the reality television show Bigg Boss, which began airing in October 2015. Keith Sequeira had to leave the show midway through due to a family emergency but he made his reentry to Bigg Boss House as the birthday gift of Rochelle Rao.

== Personal life ==
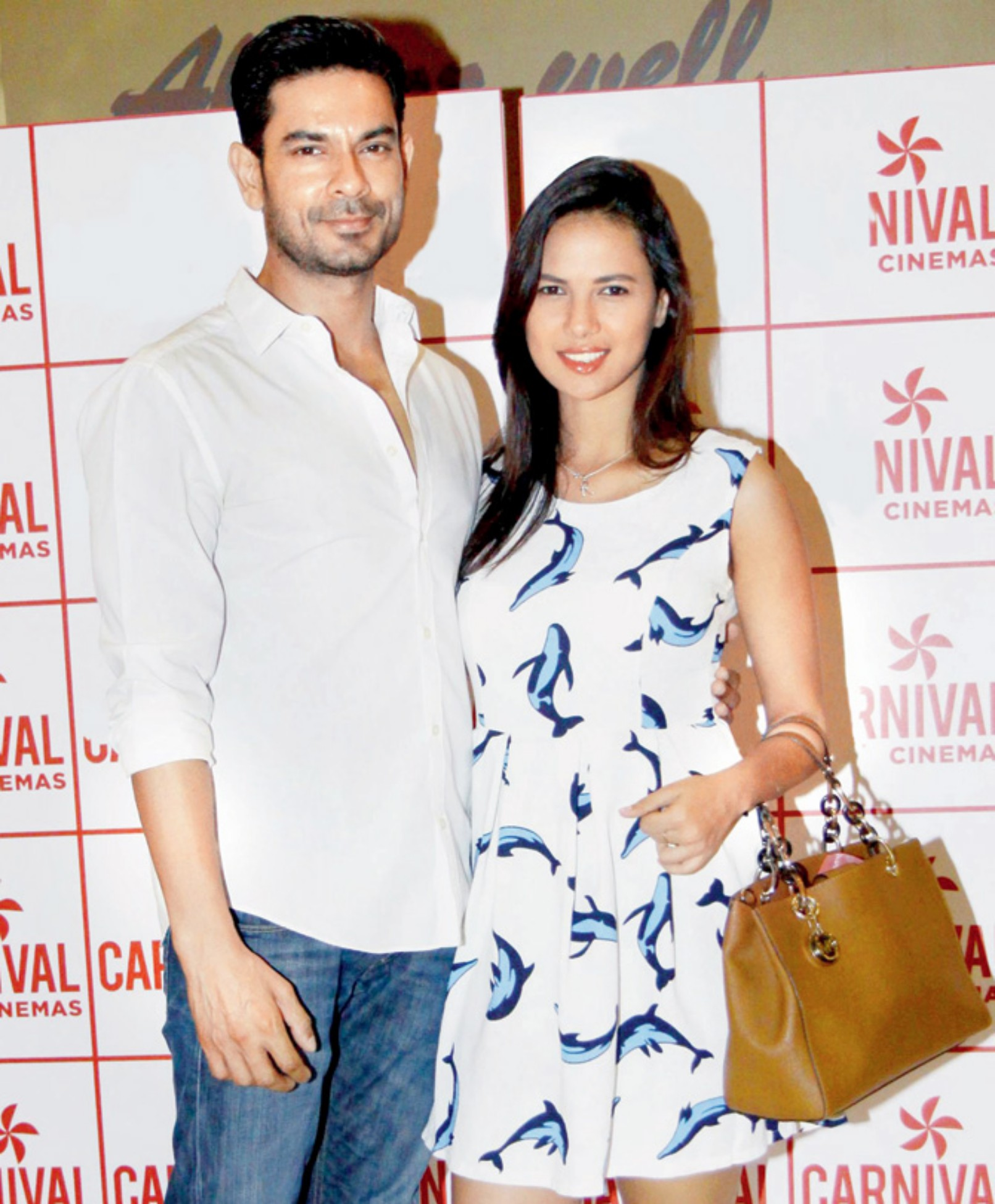
Sequeira with wife Rochelle Rao in 2015

Sequeira was married to former actress Samyuktha Singh in 2005. They separated in 2011 due to creative differences.

In 2015, Sequeira participated with girlfriend, Rochelle Rao, in Bigg Boss 9. The couple got married in March 2018 in a private ceremony in Mahaballipuram, Tamil Nadu. They went on to compete in Season 9 of the reality dance series Nach Baliye, in 2019.

== Filmography ==
=== Films ===
Year	Title	Role	Notes	Ref.
2013	Sixteen	Vikram Kapoor		
2015	Calendar Girls	Pinaki		
2020	Malang	Nitin Salgaonkar		
2023	Pathaan	Captain Mehra		

=== Television ===
Year	Title	Role	Notes	Ref.
2004	Dekho Magar Pyaar Se	Karan		
2010	AXN's Men 2.0	Host		
2012	Teri Meri Love Stories	Vivan		
2012	Super Fight League	Anchor		
2013–2014	Diya Aur Baati Hum	Officer Roy		
2015	Doli Armaano Ki	James		
2015–2016	Bigg Boss 9	Contestant	4th runner-up	
2017	Love Ka Hai Intezaar	Maharaja Madhav Ranawat		
2018	Udaan	Karan Oberoi		
2018	Dil Hi Toh Hai	Vivek	Cameo appearance	
2019	Nach Baliye 9	Contestant	14th place	

=== Music videos ===
Year	Title	Notes	Ref.
2001	Shake It Daddy	DJ Aqeel's remix of "Nahin Nahin Abhi Nahin"	
2003	Chehra Hai Ya – (Babul Supriyo Souls Forever Vol 4)	Remix of "Chehra Hai Ya Chand Khila"	
