= Tanishqa Bhosale =

Indian model

- Born: 29 May 1999 (age 27)
- Beauty pageant titleholder
- Title: Glamanand Supermodel India 2018
- Major competitions: Miss International India 2018 (Winner)

Tanishqa Bhosale (born 29 May 1999) is an Indian model and beauty pageant titleholder. She was crowned Miss India International 2018.

== Pageantry ==
In 2018, she competed at the Glamanand Supermodel India 2018 competition, where she was crowned as Miss International India 2018, held in New Delhi, on 17 September 2018.

Awards and achievements
Preceded by Ankita Kumari	Glamanand Supermodel India; 2018	Succeeded by Simrithi Bathija
