= Glamanand Supermodel India 2018 =

- Date: 17 September 2018
- Presenters: Simran Ahuja
- Venue: Kingdom of Dreams, Gurugram, India
- Entrants: 24
- Placements: 12
- Winner: Tanishqa Bhosale (Glamanand Miss International India); Simran Sharma (Glamanand Miss Multinational India); Devika Vaid (Glamanand Miss Earth India)
- Congeniality: Nishi Bharadwaj; New Delhi
- Best National Costume: Praachi Nagpal; Hyderabad
- Photogenic: Namrata Sharma; Maharashtra

Glamanand Supermodel India 2018 was the fourth edition of the Glamanand Supermodel India pageant. It concluded on 17 September 2018 at the Kingdom of Dreams in Gurugram, Delhi, India. At the conclusion of the event, 19 year old Tanishqa Bhosale from Pune was crowned Glamanand Miss India International 2018 by outgoing titleholder Ankita Kumari and represented India at the Miss International 2018 pageant that took place in Japan.

Apart from Bhosale, 19-year-old Simran Sharma from Jaipur was crowned Glamanand Miss Multinational India 2018 and represented India at Miss Multinational 2018 beauty pageant in New Delhi India.

26 year old Devika Vaid from Delhi was crowned Glamanand Miss India Earth 2018 by outgoing titleholder Shaan Suhas Kumar (Miss Earth India 2017). Shweta Parmar and Simran Sharma were adjudged first and second runners up, respectively. Devika Vaid was supposed to represent India at Miss Earth 2018, but 10 days prior to the international pageant, she suffered a leg injury. Nishi Baradwaj, 23-year-old model and semifinalist of Glamanand Supermodel India 2018, was named as her replacement. Deepshika, too was replaced by Simran Sharma for Miss Multinational 2018.

== Results ==
=== Placements ===
Placement	Contestant	International Placement
Glamanand Supermodel International 2018	Pune – Tanishqa Bhosale	Unplaced
Glamanand Supermodel Multinational 2018	Jaipur – Simran Sharma	Top 8
Glamanand Supermodel Grand International 2020	Jaipur – Simran Sharma	Unplaced
Glamanand Supermodel Earth 2018	New Delhi – Devika vaid	Unplaced
1st Runner Up	Gurugram – Shewta Parmar	

== Special awards ==
Award	Contestant
Miss Environment	Devika Vaid
Best in Speech	Devika Vaid
Best Smile	Eesha Agrawal
Miss Congeniality	Nishi Bhardwaj
Best in Rampwalk	Nishi Bhardwaj
Beauty For A Cause	Praachi Nagpal
Beauty with Brains	Praachi Nagpal
Best in National Costume	Praachi Nagpal
Miss Beautiful Skin	Simran Sharma
Miss Timeless Beauty	Tanishqa Bhosale
Best in Talent	Udita Tanwar
Best in Fitness	Udita Tanwar
Miss Multimedia	Deepshikha Sharma
Best in Swimwear	Deepshikha Sharma

== Contestants ==
No.	Contestant	Age	Hometown
01	Aashna Shaikh	24	Pune
02	Anisha Mukherjee	22	Kolkata
03	Arnitha Damparala	26	Hyderabad
04	Devika Vaid	26	New Delhi
05	Eesha Agrawal	22	New Delhi
06	Hantsula Yimchunger	26	Nagaland
07	Madhushree Gupta	25	Ranchi
08	Manisha Singh	26	New Delhi
09	Nishi Bhardwaj	23	New Delhi
10	Gagan Kaur Ahuja	25	Chandigarh
11	Praachi Nagpal	20	Hyderabad
12	Rupanshi Rana	23	Shimla
13	Sakshi Khandelwal	18	Pune
14	Shweta Parmar	19	Guwahati
15	Sibisha Phukan	20	Mumbai
16	Simran Sharma	19	Jaipur
18	Tanishqa Bhosale	19	Pune
19	Tanshuman Gurung	25	Nanital
20	Udita Tanwar	23	Jaipur
21	Vaishnavie Chauhan	21	Hamirpur
22	Pearl Almeida	26	Mumbai
23	Deepshikha Sharma	23	Kashmir
24	Nandini Kumari	21	Jamshedpur
