= Rochelle Rao =

Indian actress and model (born 1988)

- Rao in 2013
- Born: Rochelle Rao; 25 November 1988 (age 37); Chennai, Tamil Nadu, India
- Education: M.O.P. Vaishnav College for Women
- Occupations: Model; Actress
- Spouse: Keith Sequeira (m. 2018)
- Relatives: Paloma Rao (sister)
- Modeling information
- Height: 5 ft 5 in (1.65 m)

Rochelle Rao Sequeira (née Rao; born 25 November 1988) is an Indian actress, model and beauty pageant titleholder. She was crowned Femina Miss India International in 2012 and represented India at the Miss International 2012. She was a contestant on the reality shows Jhalak Dikhhla Jaa season 6, Khatron Ke Khiladi 5, Bigg Boss 9 and Nach Baliye 9. She also appeared as a main character in The Kapil Sharma Show.

== Early life ==
Rochelle Rao was born in Chennai on 25 November 1988. Her father, Nicolas V Rao, of Telugu-German ancestry is a naturalist while her mother, Wendy Rao, is an Anglo-Indian. Her sister Paloma Rao is also an actress.

She holds a BSc in Electronic media from M.O.P. Vaishnav College for Women, Chennai.

== Femina Miss India ==
Rochelle Rao competed in the fifth Pantaloons Femina Miss India South pageant in January 2012 where she was first runner up. She lost the title to Shamata Anchan. She later participated at Femina Miss India and emerged as the Femina Miss India International 2012 winner. She has also won three subtitles. "Miss Glamorous Diva", "Miss Ramp Walk", "Miss Body Beautiful". She represented India at Miss International 2012 pageant held in October 2012 (Okinawa, Japan) where she ranked ninth out of 68 countries.

== Career ==
She won the Femina Miss India International 2012 crown. Prior to this she was a model and anchor in Chennai. Rochelle was crowned by the outgoing titleholder Ankita Shorey.

She later turned host for season six of the Indian Premier League. Currently living in Mumbai, she has anchored various events and TV shows. She has also featured in many men's magazines.

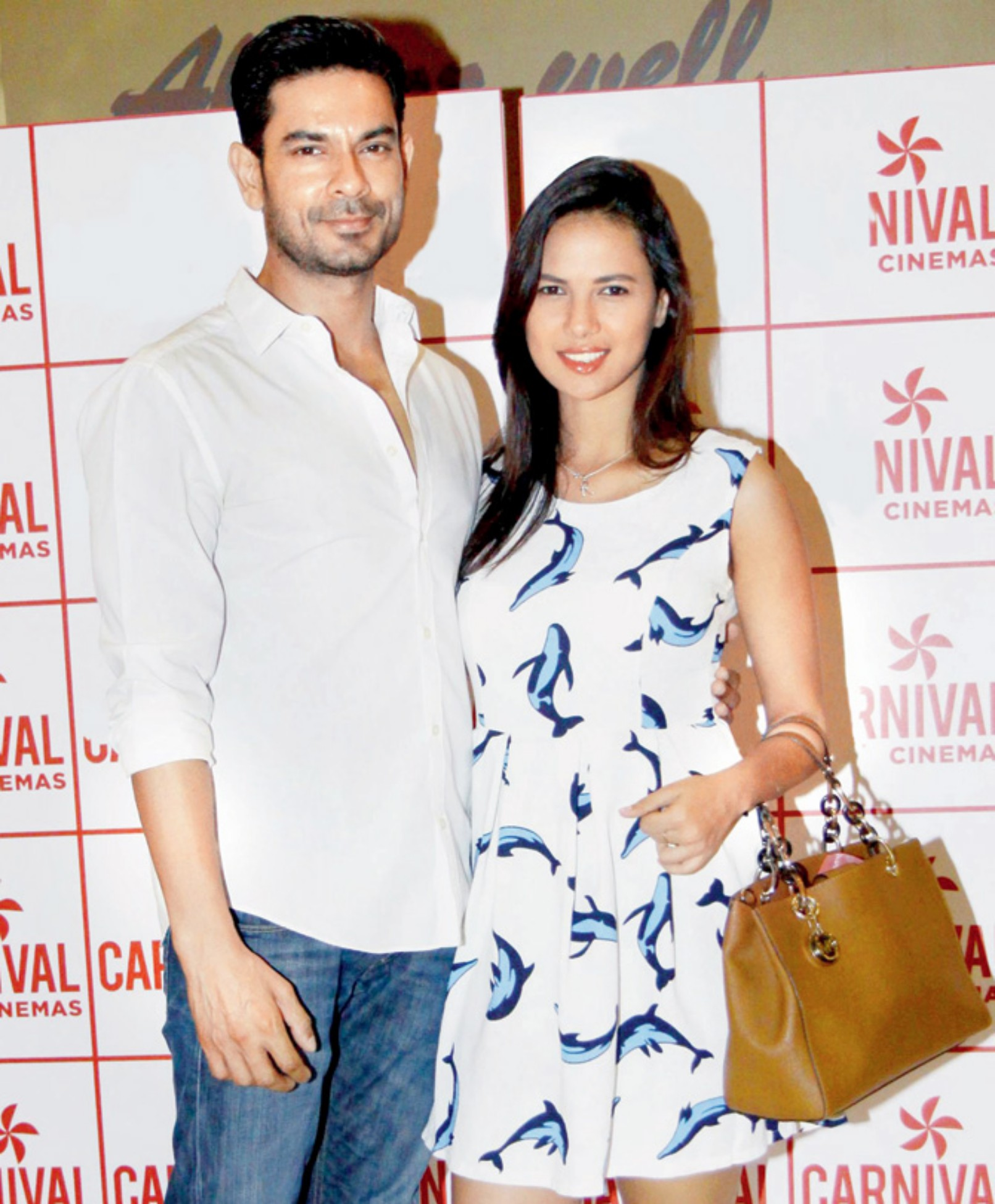
Rochelle Rao with Keith Sequeira at the premiere of Calendar Girls

She was featured in the February 2014 page of the Kingfisher calendar.

In August 2013, Rochelle was seen in Jhalak Dikhhla Jaa season 6 which aired on Colors TV as a wild card entrant. She did not get chosen for the show as she did her performance.

She was also seen in season 5 of the show Khatron Ke Khiladi in 2014. She was the second contestant to be eliminated from the show that was hosted by Rohit Shetty. In late 2014 she was seen on an adventurous travel show on Fox Life called Life Mein Ek Baar along with Evelyn Sharma, Pia Trivedi and Mahek Chahal.

In 2015, Rao became a contestant on the Indian reality TV series, Bigg Boss 9 along with boyfriend Keith Sequeira. She was paired with Prince Narula but later changed with Rimi Sen.

Rochelle Rao also hosted Aug 2022 India's Laughter Champion show successfully.

Rao is currently playing various roles in the comedy show The Kapil Sharma Show on Sony TV which started in April 2016.

She was last seen in 1962: The War in the Hills as Rimpa.

== Filmography ==
=== Television ===
Year	Title	Role	Notes	Ref.
2001	Jhalak Dikhhla Jaa 6	Contestant	Not selected	
2001	Life Mein Ek Baar	Contestant		
2014	Khatron Ke Khiladi 5	Contestant	16th place (Evicted in 3rd week)	
2015–2016	Bigg Boss 9	Contestant	3rd runner-up	
2016–2022	The Kapil Sharma Show	Nurse Lottery	Season 1	
2016–2022	The Kapil Sharma Show	Chingaari	Season 2	
2016–2022	The Kapil Sharma Show	Mr. Damodar's assistant	Season 3	
2019	Nach Baliye 9	Contestant	14th place	
2022	India's Laughter Champion	Host	season 1	

Web Series

Year	Title	Role
2021	1962: The War in the Hills	Rimpa

Awards and achievements
Preceded by Ankita Shorey	Miss International India; 2012	Succeeded by Gurleen Grewal
