= Lopamudra Raut =

Indian model (born 1995)

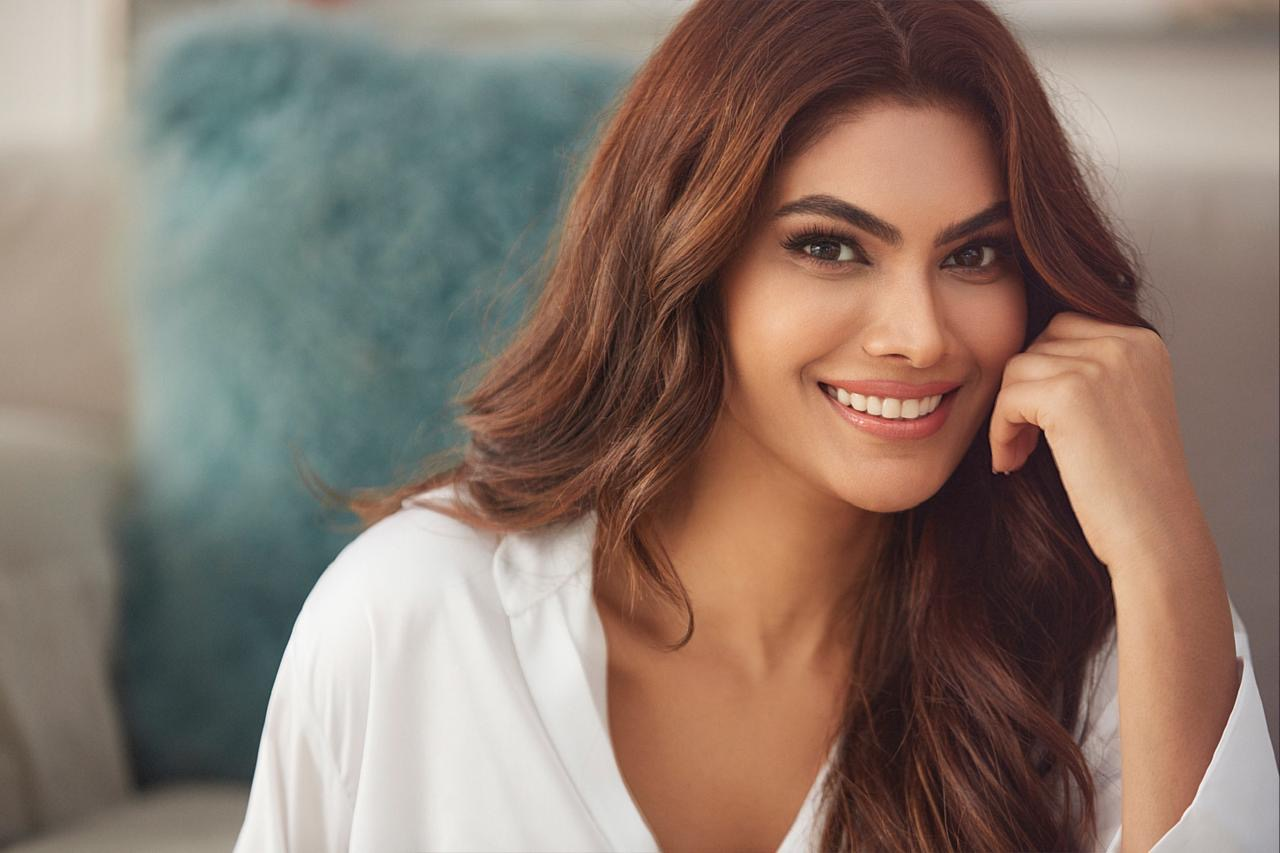
- Raut in 2024
- Born: 7 October 1995 (age 31); Nagpur, Maharashtra, India
- Education: G.H. Raisoni College of Engineering Nagpur
- Occupations: Actress; model
- Beauty pageant titleholder
- Title: Miss United Continents India 2016
- Major competitions: Femina Miss India 2013 (Top 24); Femina Miss India 2014 (Top 5); Miss Universe India 2014 (Top 7); Miss United Continents 2016 (2nd Runner-up)

Lopamudra Raut (born 7 October 1995) is an Indian actress and beauty pageant titleholder who represented India at Miss United Continents 2016, where she finished as second runner-up. In 2016, Raut participated in Bigg Boss 10, and emerged as the second runner-up.

== Early life and education ==
Raut was born on 7 October 1995 to Jeevan Raut and Ragini Raut in Nagpur, Maharashtra. She has a sister Bhagyashree Raut. She is an Electrical Engineer with a B.E in Electrical engineering from G. H. Raisoni College of Engineering Nagpur.

== Career ==
=== Modeling and pageantry ===
Raut participated in Femina Miss India Goa in 2013 where she finished as 1st Runner Up. It gave her a direct entry to participate in Femina Miss India 2013, where she was a finalist. She then participated in Femina Miss India 2014 where she won the subtitle of 'Miss Body Beautiful' and made it to the Top 5. In the same year, she took part in the Miss Diva 2014 pageant and made it to top 7 as a finalist. In 2016, she was selected by Femina organizers to compete in the Miss United Continents pageant. Raut was crowned as second runner up at Miss United Continents 2016 which took place on 25 September 2016, in Guayaquil, Ecuador.

=== Bigg Boss and film debut ===
In 2016, Raut participated in Colors TV's Bigg Boss 10 as a celebrity contestant and emerged as the second runner up. In 2017, Raut participated in Fear Factor: Khatron Ke Khiladi 8 and finished as a semi finalist.

Raut will make her film debut with Blood Story, a psychological thriller.

== In the media ==
In 2018, Raut was ranked 5th in Times Of India's Maharashtra's Most Desirable Women List.

== Filmography ==
=== Television ===
| Year | Show | Role | Notes | Refs |
|---|---|---|---|---|
| 2016–2017 | Bigg Boss 10 | Contestant | 2nd runner-up | |
| 2017 | Fear Factor: Khatron Ke Khiladi 8 | Contestant | 6th place | |

=== Web series ===
| Year | Series | Role | Platform | Refs |
|---|---|---|---|---|
| 2019 | The Verdict – State vs Nanavati | Tabassum | ALTBalaji and ZEE5 | |
| 2019 | Baytakhol | TBA | TBA | |

== Awards ==
| Year | Award | Category | Nominated work | Reference |
|---|---|---|---|---|
| 2017 | Femina Miss India | Pride of India | Miss United Continents 2nd runner-up | |

== See also ==
- Femina Miss India
- Sushrii Shreya Mishraa
- Gail Nicole Da Silva
- Purva Rana

Awards and achievements
| Preceded by (India); Sushrii Shreya Mishraa | Miss United Continents India; 2016 | Succeeded by (India); Sana Dua |
| Preceded by (India); Sushrii Shreya Mishraa | Miss United Continents - Best National Costume; 2016 | Succeeded by (Thailand); Aoom Phingchamrat |
| Preceded by (Paraguay); Myriam Arévalos | Miss United Continents - 2nd RU; 2016 | Succeeded by (Mexico); Roxana Reyes |
