= Sushrii Shreya Mishraa =

Indian model and actress

- Born: January 4, 1991 (age 35); Odisha, India
- Education: St. Joseph's Convent; SPM College
- Occupations: Actress, model
- Height: 5 ft 9 in (175 cm)
- Beauty pageant titleholder
- Title: Femina Miss India United Continents 2015
- Years active: 2010—present
- Hair color: Black
- Eye color: Black
- Major competitions: Miss Universe India 2010 (Top 30); Miss Universe India 2013 (Top 7); Femina Miss India 2015 (Top 10); Miss United Continents 2015 (3rd Runner-up) (Miss Photogenic)

Sushrii Shreya Mishraa (born 4 January 1991) is an Indian model, actress, and beauty pageant titleholder. She was crowned Femina Miss India United Continents 2015 and represented India at the Miss United Continents pageant in 2015 held in Ecuador where she became 3rd runner up. She has won several sub-contest awards, including I AM Popular, Miss Vivacious, Miss Rampwalk, and Best National Costume designed by Melvyn Noronha.

== Early life ==
Mishraa was born on 4 January 1991 in Odisha to Colonel Kishor Kumar Mishra and now-senior police official Sabita Rani Panda. Her family is Odia She grew up in Sambalpur and attended St. Joseph's Convent Higher Secondary School, then graduated with honors from Shyama Prasad Mukherji College at Delhi University with a bachelor's degree in applied psychology. She originally wanted to be a criminal psychologist. She later attended Barry John Acting School.

== Career ==
=== Pageantry ===
In 2010, she won the Asian Supermodel India pageant and was named Miss Friendship International. She later participated in the inaugural I AM She, a short-lived Indian pageant whose winners continued on to Miss Universe. She was given the I AM Popular award but did not win the competition overall. In 2013, she competed in Miss Diva and placed in the top seven semi-finalists. She also won Miss Digital Crown. Mishraa represented Odisha Femina Miss India 2015 pageant, where she was named Miss Vivacious and Miss Rampwalk and placed in the top five for Best Talent and Miss Multimedia. She also represented India at the Miss United Continents pageant and came third. She was given the titles Miss Photogenic and Best Traditional Costume. Her traditional clothing with a dress, which illustrated parts of the Vedas, created by Melvyn Noronha.

=== Modelling ===
Mishraa shot for the 2016 and 2019 Kingfisher Calendars and participated in Bombay Fashion Week in 2019. She was on the May 2016 cover of Grazia India Magazine and has appeared in adverts for MAC Cosmetics and Tanishq jewellery.

=== Acting ===
In 2018, she and a cast featuring Prateik Babbar began filming a web series called Baytakhol but the show ultimately did not air. She debuted in Bollywood with the film Zero opposite Abhay Deol. She had a small part in the romcom Malaal starring Meezaan Jafri. She appeared in the music video for "Lillah" by Aditya Narayan. And in 2021, she joined the cast of Cartel opposite Tanuj Virwani.

Mishraa's first major stage production was Jeff Goldberg's The Altamount Road Murders which was performed at the Royal Opera House in Mumbai. Goldberg wrote, directed, produced and starred it in. Not long after, she was in the Dionysiac Theatre Company's Single, directed by Karan Pandit. before reuniting with Jeff Goldberg for Witness for the Prosecution.

=== Other ===
In 2016, she was a celebrity judge at auditions for Jai Hind College.

== Personal life ==
Mishraa is a certified scuba diver and is trained in both Kathak and Bollywood styles with aerial silks. She has hypothyroidism.

== Filmography ==
=== Films ===
- Zero (2018)
- Malaal (2019)
- Ruslaan (2024)

=== Web Series ===
- Cartel (2021)

Awards and achievements
Preceded by Gail Nicole Da Silva	Miss United Continents India; 2015	Succeeded by Lopamudra Raut
Preceded by (India); Gail Nicole Da Silva	Miss United Continents - Best National Costume; 2015	Succeeded by (India) Lopamudra Raut
Preceded by (Ukraine); Anna Sardyga	Miss United Continents - 3rd RU; 2015	Succeeded by (Brazil) Taynara Gargantini
