= Femina Miss India 2013 =

- Date: 24 March 2013
- Presenters: Manish Paul
- Entertainment: Aishwarya Rai Bachchan, Priyanka Chopra, Sonu Nigam, Ritesh Deshmukh, Vivek Oberoi, Aftab Shivdasani
- Venue: Yash Raj Studios, Mumbai, Maharashtra, India
- Broadcaster: Colors
- Entrants: 23
- Placements: 10
- Winner: Navneet Kaur Dhillon; Punjab
- Congeniality: Sanjana D'Souza; Maharashtra
- Photogenic: Anukriti Gusain; Uttrakhand
- Miss Internet: Sobhita Dhulipala; Andhra Pradesh

The 50th edition of Femina Miss India was held at Yash Raj Studios in Mumbai on 24 March 2013. The event was telecast live on Colors. A total of 23 contestants competed in the pageant.

Navneet Kaur Dhillon of Punjab was crowned Femina Miss India World 2013 by the outgoing titleholder Vanya Mishra. Sobhita Dhulipala and Zoya Afroz were crowned first and second runners-up, respectively.

Dhillon represented India at Miss World 2013 in Indonesia, where she placed in the top 20 and won the Multimedia Award. Dhulipala represented India at Miss Earth 2013 in the Philippines, where she won the Miss Photogenic and Miss Eco-beauty awards, but did not place.

Following the pageant, Femina Miss India designated Vijaya Sharma and Swati Kain, both contestants in the 2013 edition, as India's representatives to Miss Supranational 2013 and Miss Heritage 2013, respectively. Sharma placed in the top 20 at Miss Supranational 2013 in Belarus. Kain was named first runner-up at Miss Heritage 2013 in Zimbabwe.

Femina Miss India also designated Purva Rana, a contestant in the 2012 edition, as India's representative at Miss United Continent 2013 in Ecuador, where she was named Vice-Queen (Virreina).

== Results ==
=== Placements ===
Placement	Contestant
Femina Miss India World 2013	Navneet Kaur Dhillon
1st Runner-Up	Sobhita Dhulipala §
2nd Runner-Up	Zoya Afroz
Top 5	Anukriti Gusain; Srishti Rana
Top 10	Apurva Lonkar; Gail Nicole Da Silva; Sagarika Chettri; Swati Kain; Vijaya Sharma

^§ Automatically qualified as a semifinalist, as the Winner of iTimes Femina Miss Digital Diva

=== Appointments ===
Shortly after the coronation night, the remaining Runner-ups and finalist delegates were given the choice to represent the country in the international beauty pageants.

Title	Contestant	International Placement
Miss India Earth 2013	Sobhita Dhulipala	Unplaced – Miss Earth 2013
Miss India Supranational 2013	Vijaya Sharma	Top 20 – Miss Supranational 2013
Miss India Asia Pacific World 2014	Anukriti Gusain	4th Runner-up – Miss Asia Pacific World 2014
Miss India United Continents 2013	Purva Rana ∆	Vice Queen – Miss United Continents 2013
Miss India Heritage 2013	Swati Kain	1st Runner-up – Miss Heritage 2013

^∆ Previous editions 2011 and 2012 Top 10 finalists, so get opportunity internationally.

=== Sub Contest Awards ===
Award	Contestant
Vaseline Femina Miss Beautiful Lips	Akshitaa Agnihotri
Reliance Digital Femina Miss Tech Diva	Anushka Shah
PCJ Femina Miss Timeless Beauty	Navneet Kaur Dhillon
Westin Femina Miss Congeniality	Sanjana D'Souza
Pond's Femina Miss Glowing Skin	Sagarika Chetri
Max Femina Miss Fashion Icon	Srishti Rana
Femina Miss Active	Manasi Moghe
Femina Miss Photogenic	Anukriti Gusain
Close-up Femina Miss Beautiful Smile	Anukriti Gusain
TRESemme Femina Miss Stylish Hair	Archita Sahu
Femina Miss Talented	Archita Sahu
Sanofi Pasteur Femina Miss Beauty for Health	Anannya Sharma
Femina Miss Water Baby	Anannya Sharma
iTimes Femina Miss Digital Diva	Sobhita Dhulipala
Femina Miss Talented	Sobhita Dhulipala
Lakme Femina Miss Eyeconic Eyes	Swati Kain
Femina Miss Iron Maiden	Swati Kain
Enhance Femina Miss Body Beautiful	Lopamudra Raut
Mochi Femina Miss Awesome Legs	Lopamudra Raut
Yamaha Ray Femina Miss Adventurous	Lopamudra Raut
Pureit Femina Miss Beauty for a Cause	Radhika Sharma
Sinhgad Institutes Femina Miss Intellectual	Radhika Sharma

== Judges ==
- Karan Johar - Producer
- Asin - Actress
- Shiamak Davar - Choreographer
- Yuvraj Singh - Cricketer
- Ritu Kumar - Choreographer
- Chitrangada Singh - Actress
- John Abraham - Actor

== Contestants ==
Contestant No.	Contestant	Age	Height	Hometown
01	Akshitaa Agnihotri	24	1.73 m (5 ft 8 in)	Punjab
02	Anannya Sarmah	24	1.73 m (5 ft 8 in)	Assam
03	Anukriti Gusain	18	1.69 m (5 ft 6 1/2 in)	Lansdowne
04	Archita Sahu	22	1.74 m (5 ft 8 1/2 in)	Bhubaneswar
05	Apurva Lonkar	22	1.73 m (5 ft 8 in)	Pune
06	Anushka Shah	19	1.72 m (5 ft 7 1/2 in)	Hyderabad
07	Gail Nicole Da Silva	20	1.73 m (5 ft 8 in)	Margao
08	Khushboo Vaidya	19	1.74 m (5 ft 8 1/2 in)	Nagpur
09	Lopamudra Raut	18	1.75 m (5 ft 9 in)	Nagpur
10	Manasi Moghe	21	1.75 m (5 ft 9 in)	Nagpur
11	Navneet Kaur Dhillon	20	1.73 m (5 ft 8 in)	Punjab
12	Panchami Rao	19	1.74 m (5 ft 8 1/2 in)	Hyderabad
13	Radhika Sharma	23	1.74 m (5 ft 8 1/2 in)	Lucknow
14	Sagarika Chhetri	23	1.73 m (5 ft 8 in)	Darjeeling
15	Saniah Baig	20	1.73 m (5 ft 8 in)	Mumbai
16	Sanjana D'souza	18	1.75 m (5 ft 9 in)	Mumbai
18	Sobhita Dhulipala	20	1.75 m (5 ft 9 in)	Visakhapatnam
19	Srishti Rana	20	1.73 m (5 ft 8 in)	Faridabad
20	Sukanya Bhattacharya	20	1.73 m (5 ft 8 in)	kolkata
21	Supriya Aiman	21	1.73 m (5 ft 8 in)	Patna
22	Swati Kain	24	1.71 m (5 ft 7 1/2 in)	New Delhi
23	Vijaya Sharma	20	1.75 m (5 ft 9 in)	New Delhi
24	Zoya Afroz	19	1.73 m (5 ft 8 in)	Lucknow

== Returns and crossovers ==
=== Femina Miss India ===
- 2014 : Gail Nicole Da Silva (2nd Runner-up)
- 2014 : Lopamudra Raut (Top 5)
- 2017 : Anukriti Gusain (Top 6)

=== Miss Universe India ===
- 2012 : Navneet Kaur Dhillon (Top 20)
- 2013 : Manasi Moghe (Winner)
- 2013 : Srishti Rana (2nd Runner-up)
- 2013 : Sukanya Bhattacharya (Top 7)
- 2014 : Lopamudra Raut (Top 7)
- 2017 : Vijaya Sharma (Top 6)

=== Miss International India ===
- 2015 : Supriya Aiman (Winner)
- 2019 : Khushboo Vaidya (Top 7)
- 2021 : Zoya Afroz (Winner)

=== Elite Model Look India ===
- 2014 : Vijaya Sharma (Winner)

=== Indian Princess ===
- 2015 : Sukanya Bhattacharya (2nd Runner-up)

=== International Pageants ===
- 2012 : Vijaya Sharma (2nd Runner up- Asian Supermodel India 2012)
- 2013: Manasi Moghe (Top 10 - Miss Universe 2013)
- 2013: Srishti Rana (Winner- Miss Asia Pacific World 2013)
- 2014 : Gail Nicole Da Silva (1st Runner up- Miss United Continents 2014)
- 2014 : Vijaya Sharma (Unplaced- Elite Model Look 2014)
- 2015 : Supriya Aiman (Unplaced- Miss International 2015)
- 2016 : Lopamudra Raut (2nd Runner up- Miss United Continents 2016)
- 2017: Anukriti Gusain (Top 20- Miss Grand International 2017)
- 2022 : Zoya Afroz (Unplaced- Miss International 2022)
