= Jhataleka =

Indian model and beauty queen

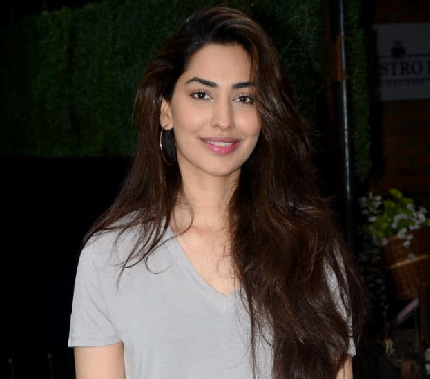
- Jhataleka in 2020
- Born: Jhataleka Malhotra
- Occupations: Model; actress
- Beauty pageant titleholder
- Title: Femina Miss India International 2014
- Years active: 2013-present
- Major competitions: Miss Universe India 2013 (Top 5); Femina Miss India 2014 (1st runner-up); Miss International 2014 (Unplaced)

Jhataleka Malhotra, known mononymously as Jhataleka, is an Indian actress, model and beauty pageant titleholder who was crowned the first runner-up in Femina Miss India 2014. She represented India at Miss International 2014 held in Japan where she won the Miss Internet Beauty award, though she did not get placed.

== Early life ==
=== Femina Miss India 2014 ===
Malhotra participated in Femina Miss India 2014 and was crowned as Femina Miss India International 2014 by Sobhita Dhulipala. She also won Best National Costume award.

=== Miss International 2014 ===
Malhotra competed in Miss International 2014 and won Miss Internet Beauty award at the pageant and her national costume, designed by Melvyn Noronha, was the 3rd runner-up.

== Career ==
In 2021, Malhotra made her film debut, starring in Sanjay Leela Bhansali's romantic film Tuesdays And Fridays opposite actress Poonam Dhillon’s son, Anmol Thakeria Dhillon. The film released on 19 February.

== Filmography ==
=== Films ===
Year	Title	Role	Notes	Ref.
2021	Tuesdays and Fridays	Sia Malhotra	Debut	
2026	Chalein?	Neha	Short movie	

=== Web series ===
Year	Title	Role	Network	Language	Ref.
2026	Jai Veeru	Vartika (Veeru)	Cinemaa Ke Bachche	Hindi	

=== Music video appearances ===
Year	Title	Singer(s)	Ref.
2022	"Gal Ban Jae"	Ammy Virk	

Awards and achievements
Preceded by Gurleen Grewal	Miss International India; 2014	Succeeded by Ayeesha Aiman
Preceded by Sobhita Dhulipala (Femina Miss India Earth 2013	Femina Miss India International; 2013	Succeeded by No titleholder announced under Femina Miss India franchise
