= List of Eta Kappa Nu chapters =

Eta Kappa Nu is the international honor society of the Institute of Electrical and Electronics Engineers (IEEE).

== Collegiate chapters ==
In the following list of collegiate chapters, active chapters are indicated in bold and inactive chapters and institutions are in italics.

Chapter	Charter date and range	Institution	Location	Status	Ref.
**Alpha**	October 28, 1904	University of Illinois Urbana-Champaign	Urbana, Illinois	Active	
**Beta**	January 1, 1905	Purdue University	West Lafayette, Indiana	Active	
**Gamma**	March 21, 1905	Ohio State University	Columbus, Ohio	Active	
**Delta**	March 23, 1905	Illinois Institute of Technology	Chicago, Illinois	Active	
**Epsilon**	December 4, 1909	Pennsylvania State University	State College, Pennsylvania	Active	
Zeta	February 3, 1910	Case Western Reserve University	Cleveland, Ohio	Active	
**Theta**	April 30, 1910	University of Wisconsin–Madison	Madison, Wisconsin	Active	
Iota	June 12, 1911	University of Missouri	Columbia, Missouri	Inactive	
**Kappa**	January 27, 1912	Cornell University	Ithaca, New York	Active	
**Lambda**	March 12, 1913	University of Pennsylvania	Philadelphia, Pennsylvania	Active	
**Mu**	December 18, 1915	University of California, Berkeley	Berkeley, California	Active	
**Nu**	May 13, 1916	Iowa State University	Ames, Iowa	Active	
**Xi**	April 12, 1920	Auburn University	Auburn, Alabama	Active	
**Omicron**	May 22, 1920	University of Minnesota	Minneapolis, Minnesota	Active	
Pi	December 19, 1921	Oregon State University	Corvallis, Oregon	Inactive	
Rho	March 4, 1922	University of Colorado Boulder	Boulder, Colorado	Inactive	
**Sigma**	May 19, 1923	Carnegie Mellon University	Pittsburgh, Pennsylvania	Active	
**Tau**	May 26, 1923	University of Cincinnati	Cincinnati, Ohio	Active	
Upsilon	June 6, 1925	University of Southern California	Los Angeles, California	Inactive	
Phi	February 20, 1926	Union College	Schenectady, New York	Inactive	
Chi	May 22, 1926	Lehigh University	Bethlehem, Pennsylvania	Inactive	
**Psi**	April 24, 1928	University of Texas at Austin	Austin, Texas	Active	
**Omega**	February 15, 1930	Oklahoma State University–Stillwater	Stillwater, Oklahoma	Active	
**Beta Alpha**	May 1, 1935	Drexel University	Philadelphia, Pennsylvania	Active	
Beta Beta (see **Zeta Sigma**)	1936–1974	Brooklyn College	New York City, New York	Consolidated	(Note: Chapter merged to become Zeta Sigma.)
**Beta Gamma**	June 6, 1936	Michigan Technological University	Houghton, Michigan	Active	
**Beta Delta**	May 14, 1937	University of Pittsburgh	Pittsburgh, Pennsylvania	Active	
**Beta Epsilon**	April 24, 1937	University of Michigan	Ann Arbor, Michigan	Active	
Beta Zeta (see **Zeta Sigma**)	1938	New York University	New York City, New York	Consolidated	
**Beta Eta**	May 28, 1938	North Carolina State University	Raleigh, North Carolina	Active	
Beta Theta	1939	Massachusetts Institute of Technology	Cambridge, Massachusetts	Inactive	
Beta Iota	May 5, 1939	University of Iowa	Iowa City, Iowa	Inactive	
Beta Kappa	May 6, 1939	Kansas State University	Manhattan, Kansas	Inactive	
**Beta Lambda**	May 18, 1940	Virginia Tech	Blacksburg, Virginia	Active	
**Beta Mu**	May 17, 1941	Georgia Tech	Atlanta, Georgia	Active	
**Beta Nu**	May 11, 1942	Rensselaer Polytechnic Institute	Troy, New York	Active	
**Beta Xi**	May 16, 1942	University of Oklahoma	Norman, Oklahoma	Active	
**Beta Omicron**	January 21, 1945	Marquette University	Milwaukee, Wisconsin	Active	
Beta Pi	February 16, 1946	City College of New York	New York City, New York	Inactive	
Beta Rho	April 2, 1947	West Virginia University	Morgantown, West Virginia	Inactive	
Beta Sigma	June 21, 1947	University of Detroit Mercy	Detroit, Michigan	Inactive	
**Beta Tau**	1948	Northwestern University	Evanston, Illinois	Active	
**Beta Upsilon**	April 24, 1948	University of Kentucky	Lexington, Kentucky	Active	
**Beta Phi**	December 11, 1948	University of Tennessee	Knoxville, Tennessee	Active	
Beta Chi	May 11, 1949	South Dakota School of Mines and Technology	Rapid City, South Dakota	Inactive	
**Beta Psi**	May 14, 1949	University of Nebraska–Lincoln	Lincoln, Nebraska	Active	
Beta Omega	May 21, 1949	University of Connecticut	Storrs, Connecticut	Inactive	
**Gamma Alpha**	June 2, 1950	Manhattan College	Bronx, New York City, New York	Active	
**Gamma Beta**	March 4, 1950	Northeastern University	Boston, Massachusetts	Active	
**Gamma Gamma**	April 29, 1950	Clarkson College	Omaha, Nebraska	Active	
Gamma Delta	June 2, 1950	Worcester Polytechnic Institute	Worcester, Massachusetts	Inactive	
**Gamma Epsilon**	June 3, 1950	Rutgers University	Piscataway, New Jersey	Active	
Gamma Zeta	March 13, 1951	Michigan State University	East Lansing, Michigan	Inactive	
Gamma Eta	April 14, 1951	Syracuse University	Syracuse, New York	Inactive	
**Gamma Theta**	April 26, 1952	Missouri University of Science and Technology	Rolla, Missouri	Active	
**Gamma Iota**	May 24, 1952	University of Kansas	Lawrence, Kansas	Active	
**Gamma Kappa**	May 23, 1953	New Jersey Institute of Technology	Newark, New Jersey	Active	
**Gamma Lambda**	July 1, 1954	Columbia University	New York City, New York	Active	
**Gamma Mu**	October 8, 1955	Texas A&M University	College Station, Texas	Active	
**Gamma Nu**	April 21, 1956	Texas Tech University	Lubbock, Texas	Active	
**Gamma Xi**	1957	University of Maryland, College Park	College Park, Maryland	Active	
Gamma Omicron	May 6, 1957	Southern Methodist University	Dallas, Texas	Inactive	
Gamma Pi	May 20, 1957	University of Virginia	Charlottesville, Virginia	Inactive	
**Gamma Rho**	November 16, 1957	South Dakota State University	Brookings, South Dakota	Active	
Gamma Sigma	1958	University of Utah	Salt Lake City, Utah	Inactive	
**Gamma Tau**	April 24, 1958	North Dakota State University	Fargo, North Dakota	Active	
Gamma Upsilon	1958	Johns Hopkins University	Baltimore, Maryland	Inactive	
**Gamma Phi**	January 19, 1959	University of Arkansas	Fayetteville, Arkansas	Active	
Gamma Chi	May 9, 1959	New Mexico State University	Las Cruces, New Mexico	Inactive	(Note: The chapter formed from Delta Pi Omega, established on November 17, 1955, when the university was known as the New Mexico College of Agriculture and Mechanical Arts.)
**Gamma Psi**	May 16, 1959	Lafayette College	Easton, Pennsylvania	Active	
**Gamma Omega**	December 10, 1959	Mississippi State University	Starkville, Mississippi	Active	
Delta Alpha	January 18, 1960	Wayne State University	Detroit, Michigan	Inactive	
Delta Beta	May 13, 1960	Lamar University	Beaumont, Texas	Inactive	
**Delta Gamma**	May 13, 1960	Louisiana Tech University	Ruston, Louisiana	Active	
Delta Delta	1960–1975	University of Denver	Denver, Colorado	Inactive	
Delta Epsilon	May 21, 1960	Ohio University	Athens, Ohio	Inactive	
Delta Zeta	May 19, 1960	Washington University in St. Louis	St. Louis, Missouri	Inactive	
Delta Eta	May 21, 1960	University of Massachusetts Amherst	Amherst, Massachusetts	Inactive	
Delta Theta	1961	Pratt Institute	Brooklyn, New York City, New York	Inactive	
Delta Iota	April 16, 1961	Louisiana State University	Baton Rouge, Louisiana	Inactive	
**Delta Kappa**	May 12, 1961	University of Maine	Orono, Maine	Active	
Delta Lambda	May 14, 1981 – xxxx ?; 2017	Duke University	Durham, North Carolina	Inactive	
Delta Mu	May 16, 1961	Villanova University	Villanova, Pennsylvania	Inactive	
**Delta Nu**	April 14, 1962	University of Alabama	Tuscaloosa, Alabama	Active	
**Delta Xi**	February 2, 1962	Air Force Institute of Technology	Wright-Patterson Air Force Base, Ohio	Active	
Delta Omicron	April 8, 1962	University of New Mexico	Albuquerque, New Mexico	Inactive	
**Delta Pi**	May 18, 1962	Colorado State University	Fort Collins, Colorado	Active	
Delta Rho	May 11, 1962	University of North Dakota	Grand Forks, North Dakota	Inactive	
**Delta Sigma**	April 14, 1962	University of Notre Dame	Notre Dame, Indiana	Active	
Delta Tau	May 19, 1962	University of Southwestern Louisiana	Lafayette, Louisiana	Inactive	
Delta Upsilon	May 21, 1960	Bradley University	Peoria, Illinois	Inactive	
**Delta Phi**	May 17, 1962	University of South Carolina	Columbia, South Carolina	Active	
**Delta Chi**	December 19, 1962	Cooper Union	New York City, New York	Active	
Delta Psi	1963–1974	Saint Louis University	St. Louis, Missouri	Inactive	
**Delta Omega**	April 9, 1963	University of Hawaiʻi at Mānoa	Honolulu, Hawaii	Active	
**Epsilon Alpha**	April 11, 1963	Cleveland State University	Cleveland, Ohio	Active	
**Epsilon Beta**	May 4, 1963	Arizona State University	Tempe, Arizona	Active	
Epsilon Gamma	April 11, 1963	University of Toledo	Toledo, Ohio	Inactive	
**Epsilon Delta**	January 11, 1964	Tufts University	Medford, Massachusetts	Active	
**Epsilon Epsilon**	May 15, 1964	University of Houston	Houston, Texas	Active	
**Epsilon Zeta**	December 12, 1964 – xxxx ?; 2024	University of Massachusetts Lowell	Lowell, Massachusetts	Active	
**Epsilon Eta**	October 27, 1965	Rose–Hulman Institute of Technology	Terre Haute, Indiana	Active	
Epsilon Theta	February 13, 1965 – xxxx ?; November 12, 2013	California State University, Long Beach	Long Beach, California	Inactive	
**Epsilon Iota**	May 15, 1965 – xxxx ?; 2015	San Jose State University	San Jose, California	Active	
**Epsilon Kappa**	December 4, 1965	University of Miami	Coral Gables, Florida	Active	
**Epsilon Lambda**	April 22, 1966	Vanderbilt University	Nashville, Tennessee	Active	
**Epsilon Mu**	April 30, 1966	University of Texas at Arlington	Arlington, Texas	Active	
Epsilon Nu	May 14, 1966	California State University, Los Angeles	Los Angeles, California	Inactive	
**Epsilon Xi**	May 22, 1966	Wichita State University	Wichita, Kansas	Active	
**Epsilon Omicron**	May 20, 1966	University of Delaware	Newark, Delaware	Active	
Epsilon Pi	May 11, 1967	Princeton University	Princeton, New Jersey	Inactive	
**Epsilon Rho**	May 12, 1967	Tennessee Tech	Cookeville, Tennessee	Active	
**Epsilon Sigma**	December 1, 1967	University of Florida	Gainesville, Florida	Active	
Epsilon Tau	May 29, 1969	University of California, Santa Barbara	Santa Barbara, California	Inactive	
**Epsilon Upsilon**	November 26, 1969	Tuskegee University	Tuskegee, Alabama	Active	
**Epsilon Phi**	April 13, 1971 – xxxx ?; 2021	California Polytechnic State University, San Luis Obispo	San Luis Obispo, California	Active	
Epsilon Chi	April 24, 1971	University of Louisville	Louisville, Kentucky	Inactive	
Epsilon Psi	May 1, 1971	Santa Clara University	Santa Clara, California	Inactive	
**Epsilon Omega**	May 4, 1971	University of Mississippi	Oxford, Mississippi	Active	
Zeta Alpha	May 5, 1971	Monmouth University	West Long Branch, New Jersey	Inactive	
**Zeta Beta**	May 8, 1971	Texas A&M University–Kingsville	Kingsville, Texas	Active	
Zeta Gamma	May 10, 1971	University of Rhode Island	Kingston, Rhode Island	Inactive	
**Zeta Delta**	May 14, 1971	University of Texas at El Paso	El Paso, Texas	Active	
Zeta Epsilon	May 14, 1971	Florida Institute of Technology	Melbourne, Florida	Inactive	
Zeta Zeta	1971	University of Akron	Akron, Ohio	Inactive	
Zeta Eta	May 26, 1971	Brigham Young University	Provo, Utah	Inactive	
Zeta Theta	June 3, 1972	California State Polytechnic University, Pomona	Pomona, California	Inactive	
**Zeta Iota**	October 8, 1972	Clemson University	Clemson, South Carolina	Active	
Zeta Kappa	February 1, 1973	Tennessee State University	Nashville, Tennessee	Inactive	
**Zeta Lambda**	April 3, 1973 – xxxx ?; 2023	Prairie View A&M University	Prairie View, Texas	Active	
Zeta Mu	1973–1991 ?	Northrop University	Inglewood, California	Inactive	(Note: Chapter went defunct when the university closed in 1991.)
**Zeta Nu**	May 18, 1973	University of Tulsa	Tulsa, Oklahoma	Active	
Zeta Xi	February 4, 1974	University of Massachusetts Dartmouth	Dartmouth, Massachusetts	Inactive	
Zeta Omicron	March 29, 1974	West Virginia University Institute of Technology	Beckley, West Virginia	Inactive	
Zeta Pi	April 5, 1974	University at Buffalo	Buffalo, New York	Inactive	
**Zeta Rho**	December 7, 1974	University of New Haven	West Haven, Connecticut	Active	
Zeta Sigma	December 9, 1974	New York University Tandon School of Engineering	Brooklyn, New York City, New York	Inactive	(Note: Chapter formed at the Polytechnic University of New York, now the Tandon School of Engineering at NYU.)
Zeta Tau	December 13, 1974	San Diego State University	San Diego, California	Inactive	
Zeta Upsilon	May 14, 1971	Old Dominion University	Norfolk, Virginia	Inactive	
Zeta Phi	January 1, 1975	Trine University	Angola, Indiana	Inactive	
Zeta Chi	December 6, 1975	University of Central Florida	Orlando, Florida	Inactive	
Zeta Psi	February 27, 1976	Southern University	Baton Rouge, Louisiana	Inactive	
Zeta Omega	February 21, 1976	University of California, Irvine	Irvine, California	Inactive	
Theta Alpha	March 13, 1976	Tulane University	New Orleans, Louisiana	Inactive	
Theta Beta	March 30, 1977	University of Portland	Portland, Oregon	Inactive	
Theta Gamma	April 22, 1978	Fairleigh Dickinson University	Madison, New Jersey	Inactive	
Theta Delta	December 7, 1977	Naval Postgraduate School	Monterey, California	Inactive	
**Theta Epsilon**	April 29, 1978	Kettering University	Flint, Michigan	Active	
Theta Zeta	April 1, 1978	University of Colorado Denver	Denver, Colorado	Inactive	
**Theta Eta**	April 29, 1978	University of Alabama in Huntsville	Huntsville, Alabama	Active	
**Theta Theta**	April 27, 1979	New York University Tandon School of Engineering	Brooklyn, New York City, New York	Active	
Theta Iota	March 2, 1979	George Washington University	Washington, D.C.	Inactive	
**Theta Kappa**	May 4, 1979	California State University, Fresno	Fresno, California	Active	
**Theta Lambda**	November 30, 1979	University of South Alabama	Mobile, Alabama	Active	
Theta Mu	December 7, 1979	Stony Brook University	Stony Brook, New York	Inactive	
**Theta Nu**	April 11, 1980 – xxxx ?; May 2022	North Carolina A&T State University	Greensboro, North Carolina	Active	
**Theta Xi**	April 28, 1980	Norwich University	Northfield, Vermont	Active	
Theta Omicron	1980	Southern Illinois University Edwardsville	Edwardsville, Illinois	Inactive	
**Theta Pi**	May 10, 1980	University of Missouri–Kansas City	Kansas City, Missouri	Active	
**Theta Rho**	January 30, 1981	Rice University	Houston, Texas	Active	
Theta Sigma	1981	University of Bridgeport	Bridgeport, Connecticut	Inactive	
Theta Tau	April 18, 1981	University of Michigan–Dearborn	Dearborn, Michigan	Inactive	
Theta Upsilon	January 16, 1982	Lawrence Institute of Technology	Southfield, Michigan	Inactive	
Theta Phi	April 7, 1982	Virginia Military Institute	Lexington, Virginia	Inactive	
Theta Chi	April 23, 1982	University of Colorado Colorado Springs	Colorado Springs, Colorado	Inactive	
Theta Psi	April 15, 1982	University of Nevada, Reno	Reno, Nevada	Inactive	
Theta Omega	February 21, 1976	University of the Pacific	Stockton, California	Inactive	(Note: Baird's gives a charter date of 1982.)
Iota Alpha	March 25, 1983	University of Alabama at Birmingham	Birmingham, Alabama	Inactive	
**Iota Beta**	February 10, 1984	Milwaukee School of Engineering	Birmingham, Alabama	Active	
**Iota Gamma**	March 29, 1984	University of California, Los Angeles	Los Angeles, California	Active	
Iota Delta	May 6, 1984	Stevens Institute of Technology	Hoboken, New Jersey	Inactive	
Iota Epsilon	November 3, 1984	University of Hartford	West Hartford, Connecticut	Inactive	
**Iota Zeta**	February 22, 1985	California State University, Chico	Chico, California	Active	
Iota Eta	December 7, 1985	University of Dayton	Dayton, Ohio	Inactive	
Iota Theta	March 8, 1986	Portland State University	Portland, Oregon	Inactive	
Iota Iota	April 5, 1986	Rochester Institute of Technology	Henrietta, New York	Inactive	
Iota Kappa	April 24, 1986	Montana State University	Bozeman, Montana	Inactive	
**Iota Lambda**	November 24, 1986	University of Illinois Chicago	Chicago, Illinois	Active	
Iota Mu	April 7, 1987	George Mason University	Fairfax, Virginia	Inactive	
**Iota Nu**	April 28, 1987	Gannon University	Erie, Pennsylvania	Active	
Iota Xi	March 5, 1988	University of Arizona	Tucson, Arizona	Inactive	
Iota Omicron	January 1, 1988	St. Cloud State University	St. Cloud, Minnesota	Inactive	
Iota Pi	April 15, 1989	California Institute of Technology	Pasadena, California	Inactive	
Iota Rho	April 22, 1989	University of New Orleans	New Orleans, Louisiana	Inactive	
**Iota Sigma**	May 12, 1989	Temple University	Philadelphia, Pennsylvania	Active	
Iota Tau	April 18, 1981	University of the District of Columbia	Washington, D.C.	Inactive	
**Iota Upsilon**	May 25, 1989	University of Washington	Seattle, Washington	Active	
**Iota Phi**	May 9, 1991	United States Military Academy	West Point, New York	Active	
**Iota Chi**	November 10, 1990 – xxxx ?; 2017	Oakland University	Rochester, Michigan	Active	
Iota Psi	1991	New York Institute of Technology	Old Westbury, New York	Inactive	
Iota Omega	December 21, 1990	California State University, Fullerton	Fullerton, California	Inactive	
**Kappa Alpha**	March 22, 1991– xxxx ?; May 25, 2017	Northern Illinois University	DeKalb, Illinois	Active	
Kappa Beta	December 6, 1991	Wilkes University	Wilkes-Barre, Pennsylvania	Inactive	
Kappa Gamma	March 1, 1991	University of Alaska Fairbanks	Fairbanks, Alaska	Inactive	
**Kappa Delta**	April 3, 1992	Florida International University	University Park, Florida	Active	
**Kappa Epsilon**	November 20, 1992	Binghamton University	Binghamton, New York	Active	
Kappa Zeta	December 11, 1992	New York Institute of Technology	Manhattan, New York City, New York	Inactive	
**Kappa Eta**	December 11, 1993	University of San Diego	San Diego, California	Active	
**Kappa Theta**	February 26, 1994	University of Wisconsin–Platteville	Platteville, Wisconsin	Active	
Kappa Iota	April 24, 1994 – xxxx ?; March 19, 2024	Embry–Riddle Aeronautical University, Prescott	Prescott, Arizona	Inactive	
Kappa Kappa	November 17, 1995	University of Texas at Dallas	Richardson, Texas	Inactive	
**Kappa Lambda**	December 15, 1995 – xxxx ?; April 20, 2015	University of Memphis	Memphis, Tennessee	Active	
Kappa Mu	May 2, 1997	Capitol Technology University	South Laurel, Maryland	Inactive	
Kappa Nu	May 17, 1997	University of North Florida	Jacksonville, Florida	Inactive	
**Kappa Xi**	April 21, 1998	University of South Florida	Tampa, Florida	Active	
**Kappa Omicron**	October 12, 1999	State University of New York at New Paltz	Jacksonville, Florida	Active	
Kappa Pi	October 27, 2001	Boise State University	Boise, Idaho	Inactive	
Kappa Rho	April 22, 1989	Indiana University–Purdue University Indianapolis	Indianapolis, Indiana	Inactive	
**Kappa Sigma**	March 21, 2003 – xxxx ?; 2017	Boston University	Boston, Massachusetts	Active	
**Kappa Tau**	March 28, 2003	Baylor University	Waco, Texas	Active	
**Kappa Upsilon**	November 19, 2004	University of Texas at San Antonio	San Antonio, Texas	Active	
**Kappa Phi**	April 29, 2005	University of North Carolina at Charlotte	Charlotte, North Carolina	Active	
Kappa Chi	May 6, 2005	Virginia Commonwealth University	Richmond, Virginia	Inactive	
**Kappa Psi**	June 2, 2005	University of California, San Diego	San Diego, California	Active	
Kappa Omega	April 5, 2006	Western Michigan University	Kalamazoo, Michigan	Inactive	
**Lambda Alpha**	April 22, 2006	University of West Florida	Pensacola, Florida	Active	
**Lambda Beta**	November 30, 2007	California State University, Northridge	Los Angeles, California	Active	
Lambda Gamma	April 27, 2009	Howard University	Washington, D.C.	Inactive	
Lambda Delta	April 9, 2009	Florida A&M University – Florida State University College of Engineering	Tallahassee, Florida	Inactive	
Lambda Epsilon	April 28, 2010	Southern Illinois University Carbondale	Carbondale, Illinois	Inactive	
**Lambda Zeta**	December 1, 2011	University of North Texas	Denton, Texas	Active	
Lambda Eta	February 10, 2012	Bharati Vidyapeeth College of Engineering	Navi Mumbai, India	Inactive	
Lambda Theta	March 5, 2012	Dalhousie University	Nova Scotia, Canada	Inactive	
Lambda Iota	January 13, 2012	University of Hong Kong	Pok Fu Lam, Hong Kong Island, Hong Kong	Inactive	
Lambda Kappa	April 26, 2012	United States Naval Academy	Annapolis, Maryland	Inactive	
**Lambda Lambda**	March 14, 2018	American University of Sharjah	Sharjah, Emirate of Sharjah, United Arab Emirates	Active	
**Lambda Mu**	May 2, 2012	Texas A&M University at Qatar	Education City, Al Rayyan, Qatar	Active	
**Lambda Nu**	November 28, 2012	University of Scranton	Scranton, Pennsylvania	Active	
**Lambda Xi**	December 5, 2012	Hofstra University	Hempstead, New York	Active	
**Lambda Omicron**	April 22, 2013	Miami University	Oxford, Ohio	Active	
Lambda Pi	April 1, 2013	Union University	Jackson, Tennessee	Inactive	
**Lambda Rho**	May 21, 2013	Monterrey Institute of Technology and Higher Education	Monterrey, Mexico	Active	
Lambda Sigma	February 28, 2014	University of California, Riverside	Riverside, California	Inactive	
**Lambda Tau**	May 12, 2014	University of Puerto Rico at Mayaguez	Mayagüez, Puerto Rico	Active	
**Lambda Upsilon**	April 28, 2010	Embry-Riddle Aeronautical University, Daytona Beach	Daytona Beach, Florida	Active	
Lambda Phi	March 8, 2018	Khalifa University	Abu Dhabi, United Arab Emirates	Inactive	
**Lambda Chi**	April 8, 2024	Hampton University	Hampton, Virginia	Active	
Lambda Psi	September 8, 2015	University of Johannesburg	Johannesburg, South Africa	Inactive	
**Lambda Omega**	February 2, 2013	National University of Singapore	Queenstown, Singapore	Active	
**Mu Alpha**	December 21, 2014	UCSI University	Kuala Lumpur, Malaysia	Active	(Note: Chapter was installed in January 2015.)
**Mu Beta**	April 28, 2018	Arab Academy for Science, Technology and Maritime Transport	Alexandria, Egypt	Active	
**Mu Gamma**	March 22, 2024	Polytechnic University of Puerto Rico	San Juan, Puerto Rico	Active	
Mu Delta	November 21, 2015	Eastern Washington University	Cheney, Washington	Inactive	
Mu Epsilon	December 14, 2015	Singapore University of Technology and Design	Tampines, Singapore	Inactive	
**Mu Zeta**	November 21, 2015	Western Washington University	Bellingham, Washington	Active	
**Mu Eta**	August 23, 2016	University of KwaZulu-Natal	Durban, KwaZulu-Natal, South Africa	Active	
Mu Theta	February 24, 2016	Chulalongkorn University	Patumwan, Bangkok, Thailand	Inactive	(Note: Chapter was founded on February 24, 2016 and installed on March 7.)
**Mu Iota**	October 21, 2016	Seattle University	Seattle, Washington	Active	
**Mu Kappa**	March 1, 2017	University of Queensland	Brisbane, Queensland, Australia	Active	
Mu Lambda	March 27, 2017	East Carolina University	Greenville, North Carolina	Inactive	
**Mu Mu**	February 3, 2017	Wentworth Institute of Technology	Boston, Massachusetts	Active	
**Mu Nu**	March 20, 2017	Polytechnic University of Turin	Turin, Italy	Active	
**Mu Xi**	March 27, 2017	Indian Institute of Science	Bangalore, Karnataka, India	Active	
**Mu Omicron**	2017	Christopher Newport University	Newport News, Virginia	Active	
Mu Pi	April 25, 2018	G. H. Raisoni College of Engineering Nagpur	Nagpur, Maharashtra, India	Inactive	
**Mu Rho**	April 28, 2018	Valparaiso University	Valparaiso, Indiana	Active	
Mu Sigma	May 17, 2018	National Chiao Tung University	Hsinchu, Taiwan	Inactive	(Note: The university closed in 2021.)
**Mu Tau**	July 25, 2018	Waseda University	Shinjuku, Tokyo, Japan	Active	
**Mu Upsilon**		Texas State University	San Marcos, Texas	Colony	
Mu Phi	August 24, 2018	University of California, Santa Cruz	Santa Cruz, California	Inactive	
Mu Chi	November 2, 2018	University of Evansville	Evansville, Indiana	Inactive	
Mu Psi	August 16, 2019	Autonomous University of Querétaro	Querétaro, Mexico	Inactive	
Mu Omega	September 3, 2020	Florida Polytechnic University	Lakeland, Florida	Inactive	
**Nu Alpha**	July 17, 2020	National University of Distance Education	Spain	Active	
Nu Beta	July 17, 2020	Technical University of Madrid	Madrid, Spain	Inactive	
**Nu Gamma**	November 15, 2020	The College of New Jersey	Ewing Township, New Jersey	Active	
**Nu Delta**	June 9, 2021	University of Washington Tacoma	Tacoma, Washington	Active	
**Nu Epsilon**	April 24, 2022	Kennesaw State University	Kennesaw, Georgia	Active	
**Nu Zeta**	November 9, 2023	Escuela Superior Politécnica del Litoral	Guayaquil, Ecuador	Active	(Note: The Board of Governors approved the chapter on November 9, 2023. Its official inauguration was on February 20, 2024.)
**Nu Eta**	September 29, 2023	Sri Sai Ram Engineering College	Chennai, Tamil Nadu, India	Active	
**Nu Theta**	October 19, 2023	Purdue University Northwest	Hammond, Indiana	Active	
**Nu Iota**		Obuda University	Budapest, Hungary	Active	(Note: The IEEE-Eta Kappa Nu Board of Governors approved this chapter on August 24, 2023. It has yet to be installed.)

== Professional chapters ==
Members in Eta Kappa Nu's professional chapter are chosen by the society's Board of Governors from outstanding individuals working in the fields of electronics and electrical engineering. Active chapters are indicated in bold. Inactive chapters and institutions are in italics.

Chapter	Charter date	Status	Ref.
**Eta**		Active	

== Alumni chapters ==
In the following list of alumni chapters, active chapters are indicated in bold and inactive chapters are in italics

Chapter	Charter date	Location	Status	Ref.
**Greater New York Alumni Chapter**		New York City, New York	Active	
**LA Alumni Chapter**		Los Angeles, California	Active	
**San Francisco Alumni Chapter**		San Francisco, California	Active	
**Seattle Area Alumni Chapter**		Seattle, Washington	Active	
**SE Michigan Alumni Chapter**		Michigan	Active	
