= Miss Wow =

Beauty contest

Miss WOW
- Formation: 2014
- Type: Beauty pageant
- Headquarters: Surat
- Location: India
- Official language: Hindi, English
- Key people: Ornob Moitra
- Website: http://misswow.co.in/

Miss WOW is an annual beauty pageant held in Surat, Gujarat to crown women from across India who possess beauty with intelligence to inspire, empower and connect the community. The pageant first began in 2014 and is usually held mid-year.

== History ==
The first ever Miss WOW pageant was held on 29 Mar 2014 in Surat. Fourteen candidates were shortlisted from all across the state to compete at the main event. Professional model, Nazneen Shaikh bagged the Miss WOW 2014 title. She was also one of the top 20 finalists of Femina Miss India. Nazneen Shaikh won the title Miss. WOW followed by Kunica Taneja and Akansha Solanki who were awarded the first and second runners up respectively.

Miss WOW 2015 was launched by Bollywood Celebrity Poonam Pandey. Aashna Shah was crowned as Miss Wow 2015.

The latest Miss WOW finale in June 2016 was judged by Femina Miss India 2014, Koyal Rana who represented India in the Miss World 2014 pageant and was one of the final top 10 contenders in the pageant. 150 participants were selected in the first round in 2016 of which only 30 went on to compete further. The 30 finally narrowed down to the top 14 coveted the Miss WOW Title in the finale.

In June 2016, Mumbai based, Komal Chandel was crowned as Miss WOW 2016. The runners up were Nupoor Tailor and Rashi Shah respectively.

== Miss WOW Editions ==
Year	Winners	Shortlisted Contestants	Date
2016	Miss WOW 2016 – Komal Chandel; Miss WOW 1st RU - Noopur Tailor; Miss WOW 2nd RU – Rashi Shah	16	June 12, 2016
2015	Miss WOW 2015 - Aashna Shah; Miss WOW 1st RU - Jiya Sojitra; Miss WOW 2nd RU - Richa Narang	16	June, 2015
2014	Miss WOW 2014 – Nazneen Shaikh; Miss WOW RU – Kunica Taneja; Miss WOW 2nd RU –Akansha Solanki	14	March 29, 2014
