= Manasi Moghe =

Indian beauty pageant contestant

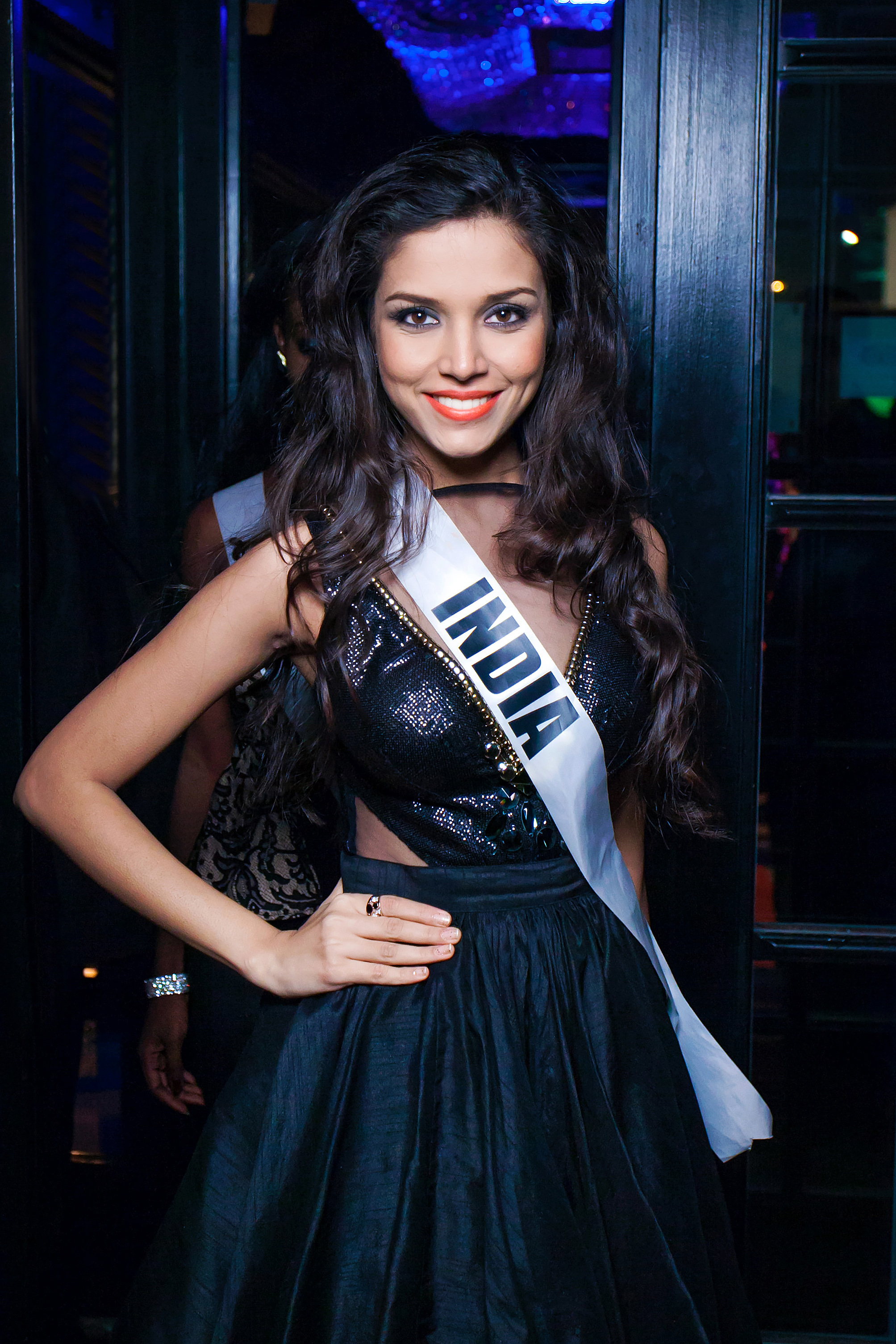
- Born: Manasi Moghe; 29 August 1991 (age 35); Indore, Madhya Pradesh, India
- Height: 5 ft 8 in (173 cm)
- Beauty pageant titleholder
- Title: Miss Diva Universe 2013
- Hair color: Black
- Eye color: Black
- Major competitions: Femina Miss India 2013 (Miss Active) (Miss Iconic Eye); Miss Diva - 2013 (Winner - Miss Diva Universe 2013); Miss Universe 2013 (Top 10)

Manasi Moghe (born 29 August 1991) is an Indian actress and beauty pageant titleholder who was crowned Miss Diva Universe 2013 and represented India at Miss Universe 2013 on 9 November 2013. She ended up placing among the top 10 finalists.

== Early life ==
Manasi Moghe was born in Indore, Madhya Pradesh, India into a Marathi family. She completed her schooling from Sri Sathya Sai Vidya Vihar, Indore.

== Pageantry ==
=== Miss Universe 2013 ===
During Miss Universe 2013 when Finale was on 9 November 2013 and Manasi Moghe placed among the Top 10 finalists as fifth runner-up.

=== Miss Diva - 2013 ===
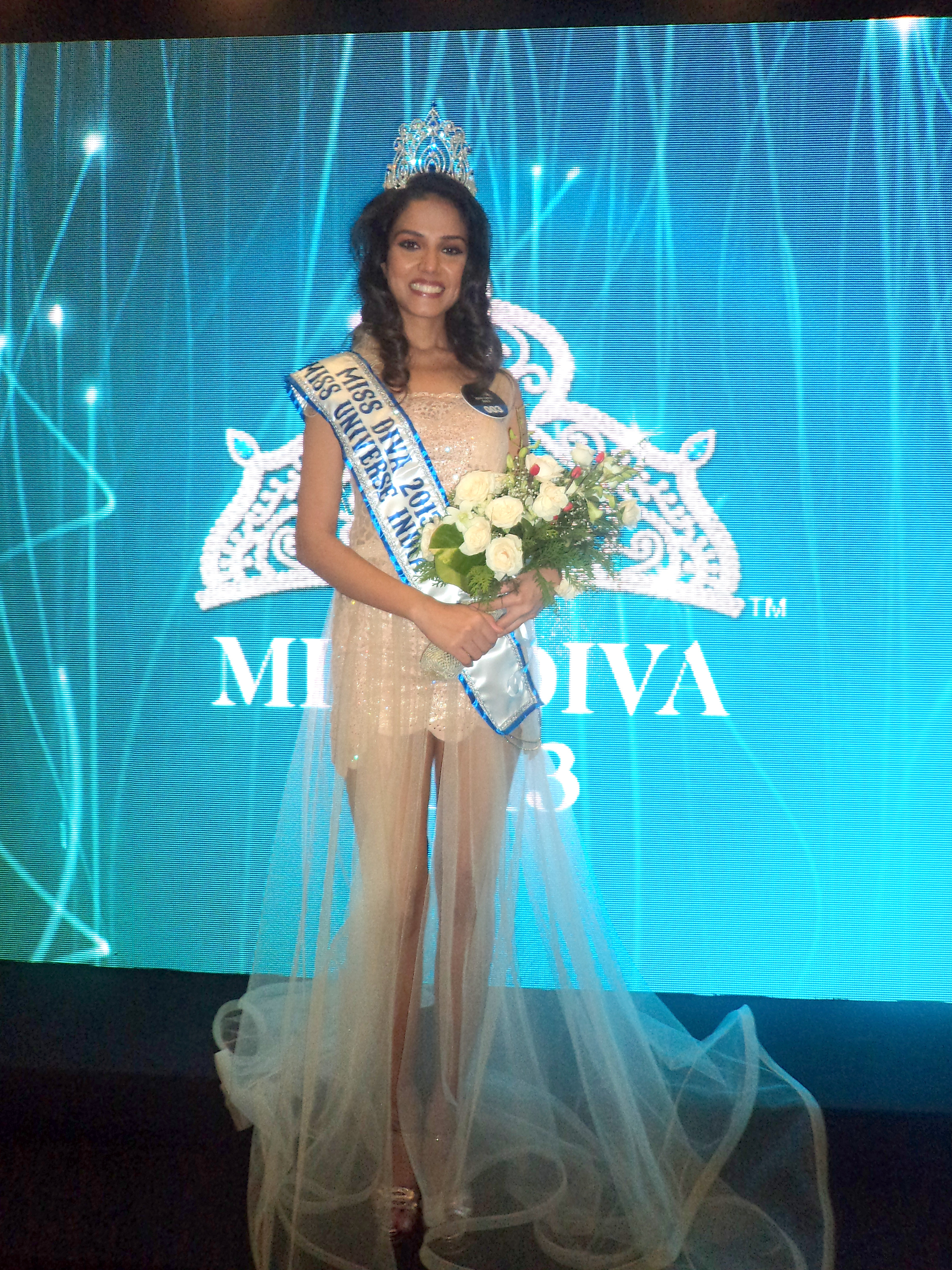
Manasi Moghe after being crowned the first Miss Diva Universe in 2013

The Miss Diva 2013 finale, held on 5 September 2013 Thursday night at Hotel Westin Mumbai Garden City, saw 14 finalists, including Manasi Moghe, competing against each other to win the title.

Manasi Moghe was crowned Miss Diva Universe 2013, while Gurleen Grewal was declared Miss Diva International 2013 and Srishti Rana was declared Miss Diva Asia Pacific World 2013.

Manasi then competed at Miss Universe 2013 finishing in the Top 10.

=== Femina Miss India 2013 ===
Manasi was one of the 21 finalists of Femina Miss India 2013. She got Wild Card Entry to the Pageant where she won Miss Active sub-title.

== Film career ==
Manasi made her cinematic debut in a Marathi language film title Bugadi Maazi Sandli Ga in the year 2014. She paired up with Kashyap Parulekar in the film. She is starring in a film opposite superstar Ankush Choudhary in an upcoming Marathi film directed by Satish Rajwade.

== Filmography ==
Year	Title	Role	Notes
2015	Bugadi Maazi Sandli Ga	Shubhangi	Marathi film
2021	Khwabon Ke Parindey		Voot web series
2022	Autograph – Ek Japun Thevavi Ashi Lovestory	Anushka	Marathi film
2023	Yaariyan 2	Laadli's Friend	Hindi film

Awards and achievements
Preceded by Shilpa Singh	India's Representative at Miss Universe; 2013	Succeeded by Noyonita Lodh
Preceded by First Winner	Miss Diva Universe; 2013	Succeeded by Noyonita Lodh
