= Sonika Chauhan =

Indian actress

Sonika Singh Chauhan
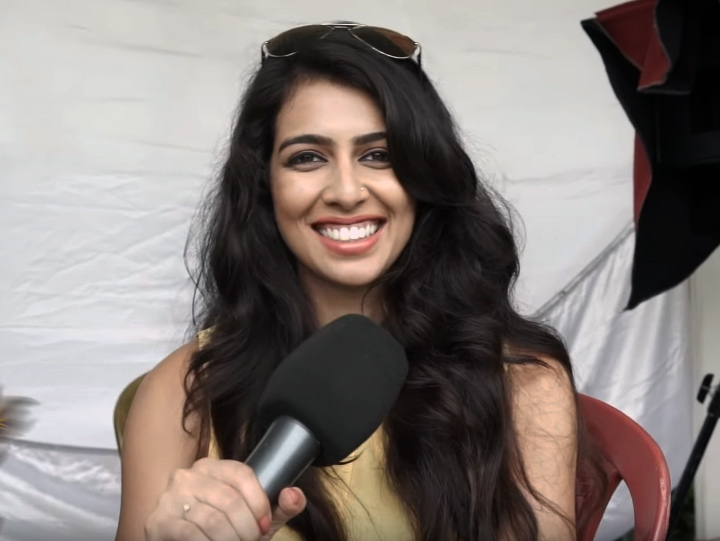
- Sonika Chauhan during IPL (2015)
- Born: 12 July 1989
- Died: 29 April 2017 (aged 27); Kolkata, West Bengal, India
- Resting place: Lower Circular Road Cemetery, Kolkata; 22.547837°N 88.363659°E
- Education: Mount Carmel College, Bangalore
- Occupations: TV actress, model, TV host

Sonika Simone Singh Chauhan (12 July 1989 – 29 April 2017) was an Indian actress, tv host, model and beauty pageant titleholder. She was a contestant at Femina Miss India and Miss Diva - 2013.

She sustained fatal injuries in a 2017 crash with Vikram Chatterjee at the wheel, leading to his arrest.

== Biography ==
She was born on 12 July 1989, the only child to a Christian mother, Sharon Singh Chauhan and a Hindu Rajput father, Vijay Singh Chauhan. She attended La Martiniere, Kolkata for her schooling. She completed her higher education at Mount Carmel College, Bengaluru.

== Death ==
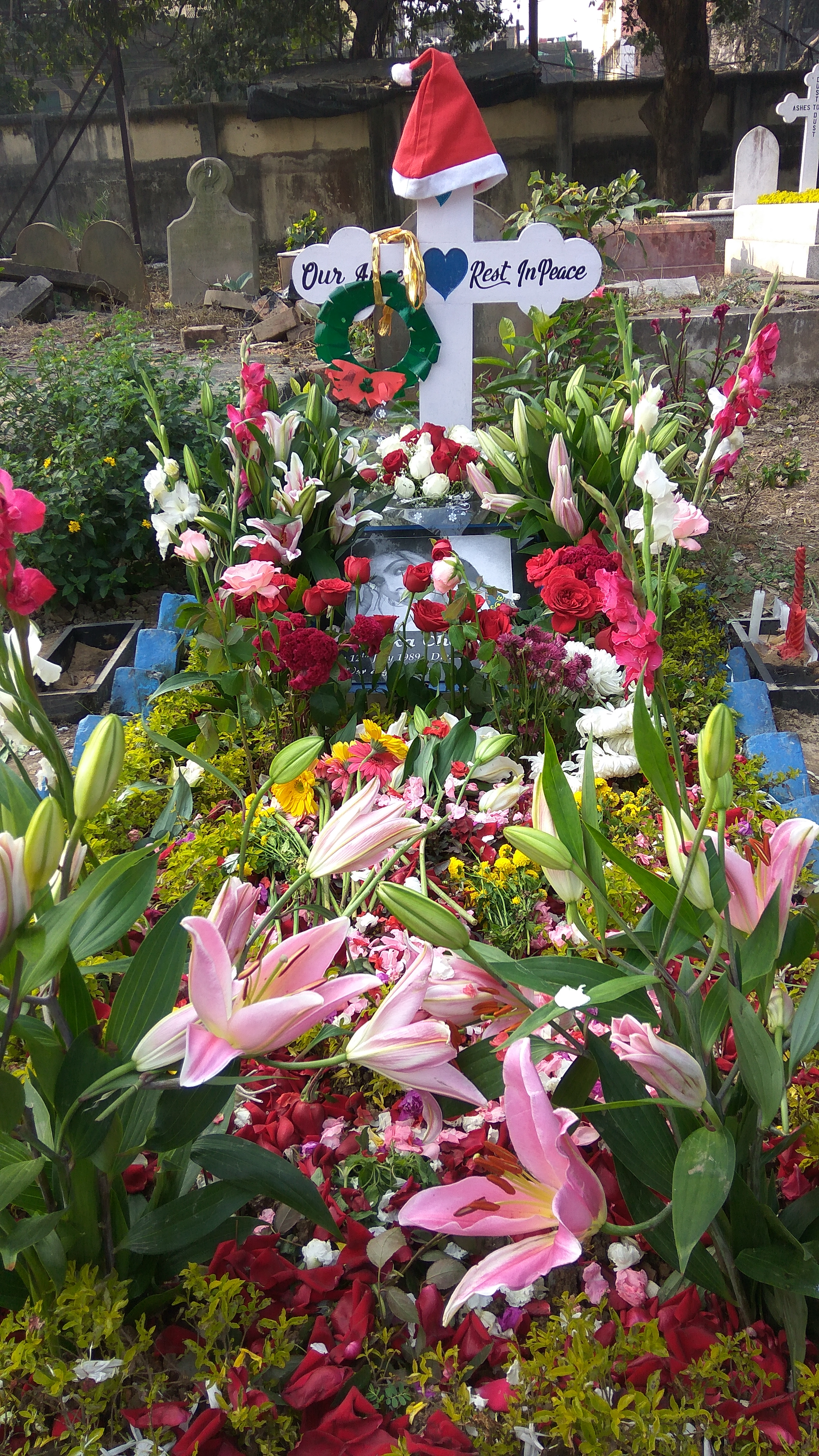
Sonika Chauhan resting place, Lower Circular Road Cemetery

Sonika sustained a fatal head injury in a car accident in the early hours of 29 April 2017. The vehicle belonged to Vikram Chatterjee, who was behind the wheel at the time of the accident. Vikram took Sonika to Ruby Hospital, where she died from her injuries. Vikram initially denied that he was either speeding or under the influence of alcohol at a press conference, but forensic reports have confirmed that he was driving at a speed of 100–110 km/h just seconds before the collision with a jewellery store and a flag post on Kolkata's Rashbehari Avenue.

Initially, Vikram was only booked under Section 304 A (death due to negligence) of the Indian Penal Code. But after a massive public outcry, police added the non-bailable Section 304 (culpable homicide) under the IPC as well as charging him for driving under the influence under Motor Vehicles Act. He was arrested on 7 July 2017 after a period during which he was absconding, and released on bail on 26 July 2017.

== Legacy ==
On 12 July 2017, 'Sonika Chauhan 27 Foundation' was launched by her parents at Tollygunge Club as a gift and a contribution to Sonika Chauhan on her birthday. 'Sonika Chauhan 27 Foundation' will take forward the legacy of Sonika Simone Singh Chauhan by touching the lives of young people, without any discrimination of caste, creed or religion.
