= Gail Nicole Da Silva =

Indian model and beauty queen (born 1993)

- Born: Gail Nicole Da Silva; 6 February 1993 (age 33); Margao, Goa, India
- Education: Dempo College of Commerce and Economics
- Occupation: Model
- Height: 1.73 m (5 ft 8 in)
- Beauty pageant titleholder
- Title: Femina Miss India United Continent 2014; Femina Miss India Goa 2013
- Years active: 2013–present
- Hair color: Brown
- Eye color: Brown
- Major competitions: Femina Miss India Goa 2013 (Winner); Femina Miss India 2013 (Top 10); Femina Miss India 2014 (2nd Runner-up); Miss United Continents 2014 (1st Runner Up) (Miss Photogenic)

Gail Nicole Da Silva (born 6 February 1993) is an Indian model and beauty pageant titleholder who won the title of Femina Miss India United Continent 2014 and placed as first runner-up at the Miss United Continents 2014 pageant. She also won Best National Costume and Miss Photogenic at Miss United Continent 2014.

== Early life and education ==
Da Silva was born into a Goan Catholic family. She went to St. Pius X Convent High School and graduated from Dempo college of commerce and economics, Panaji, Goa.

== Femina Miss India 2014 ==
Da Silva was crowned as the Femina Miss United Continent 2014.

== Miss United Continent 2014 ==
She represented India at Miss United Continents 2014 and was crowned first runner-up there. She won two awards at the pageant, Miss Photogenic and Best in National Costume.

== Pond's Femina Miss India 2013 ==
Da Silva was one of the top 10 finalists of Femina Miss India 2013. She later won at Femina Miss India 2014.

== Pond’s Femina Miss India Goa 2013 ==
She was crowned Femina Miss India Goa 2013. She also won Pond's Femina Miss Glowing Skin title at the pageant.

Awards and achievements
Preceded by Purva Rana	Femina Miss India United Continent; 2014	Succeeded by Sushrii Shreya Mishraa
Preceded by (Philippines) Christina Joy Montero Devries	Miss United Continents, Miss Photogenic; 2014	Succeeded by (India) Sushrii Shreya Mishraa
Preceded by (Chile) María Belén Jérez	Miss United Continents, 1st Runner-up; 2014	Succeeded by (Colombia) Daniela Castaneda
Preceded by (Ecuador) Carolina Aguirre	Miss United Continents, Best in National Costume; 2014	Succeeded by (India) Sushrii Shreya Mishraa
