= Navneet Kaur Dhillon =

Indian actress and model

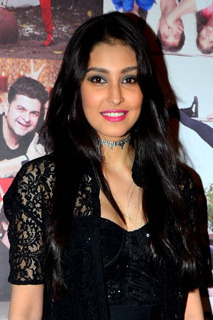
- Dhillon in 2018
- Born: September 23; Ambala, Haryana, India
- Occupations: Actress, model
- Beauty pageant titleholder
- Title: Pond's Femina Miss India Chandigarh 2013; Femina Miss India World 2013
- Years active: 2012–present
- Major competitions: I AM She 2012; Miss World 2013; (Top 20); (Multimedia Award)

Navneet Kaur Dhillon is an Indian actress, model and beauty pageant titleholder who represented India at Miss World 2013. She was the winner of Pond's 50th edition of Femina Miss World India 2013 that was held in Mumbai on 24 March 2013. She won the Miss Multimedia award during Miss World 2013 beauty pageant. She finished in top 20.

== Early life ==
Her father is an Indian Army officer. Her early education was from Army Public School, Ambala Cantt., and she finally settled in Patiala and finished her secondary education from Budha Dal Public School, Patiala. She then pursued TV and media studies from Punjabi University, Patiala for a B. Tech. Along with modelling, she also has interest in photography, swimming, horse-riding.

== Pond's Femina Miss India 2013 ==
She was crowned as the Femina Miss India World 2013 on 24 March 2013. Navneet was also crowned Femina Miss Timeless Beauty. She faced with a question of what her one regret would be if she were to die the following day, to which she replied as "The only thing I would regret would be not having done as much for society as I would like to. Issues of women's empowerment and child labour and other social evils are a big concern."

== Pond’s Femina Miss India Chandigarh 2013 ==
She was adjusted winner amongst the 11 finalists in the last round of Pond's Femina Miss India Chandigarh 2013. Navneet was also crowned Pond's Femina Miss Glowing Skin.

== I AM She 2012 ==
She was amongst the finalist of I AM She 2012 as contestant No. 6, although she didn't place in the contest but her grooming worked for Femina Miss India 2013.

== Career ==
In an interview with PTI, she said that she is interested in Bollywood and if given an opportunity, she would definitely work hard. She was busy with the Femina Miss India 2013 tour and photo sessions at different locations of India and abroad. She is currently the brand ambassador for Pond's White Beauty BB+ Fairness cream.

== Filmography ==
Year	Title	Role	Language	Notes
2016	Love Shhuda	Pooja Misra	Hindi	Hindi Debut
2016	Ambarsariya	Jasleen Kaur	Punjabi	Punjabi Debut
2016	Ekta	Ekta	Hindi	
2016	Jaani		Punjabi	
2019	High End Yaariyaan	Seerat	Punjabi	
2019	Amavas	Maya	Hindi	
2020	Jinde Meriye		Punjabi	
2023	Gol Gappe		Punjabi	
2024	Chhota Bheem and the Curse of Damyaan	Tashika	Hindi	

== See also ==
- Femina Miss India
- Femina Miss World India 2013
- Miss Diva 2013

Awards and achievements
Preceded by (India) Vanya Mishra	Femina Miss India World; 2013	Succeeded by (India) Koyal Rana
Preceded by (India) Vanya Mishra	Miss World; Miss Multimedia; 2013	Succeeded by (United States) Elizabeth Safrit
