= Ruslaan =

- Theatrical release poster
- Directed by: Karan Lalit Butani
- Screenplay by: Yunus Sajawal; Mohit Srivastava; Kavin Dave
- Story by: Shiva
- Produced by: K. K. Radhamohan, Ramana Rao Rudrapati
- Starring: Aayush Sharma; Sushrii Shreya Mishraa; Jagapathi Babu; Vidya Malvade
- Cinematography: G. Srinivas Reddy
- Edited by: Rajendra Bhaat
- Music by: Vishal Mishra; Rajat Nagpal; Akashdeep Sengupta
- Production companies: Sri Sathya Sai Arts, SLV Cinemas
- Distributed by: NH Studioz
- Release date: 26 April 2024
- Running time: 139 minutes
- Country: India
- Language: Hindi
- Budget: ₹25 crore
- Box office: est. ₹2.70 crore

Ruslaan is a 2024 Indian Hindi-language action film directed by Karan Lalit Butani and produced by Ramana Rao Rudrapati and K. K. Radhamohan. It stars Aayush Sharma, alongside Sushrii Shreya Mishraa, Jagapathi Babu and Vidya Malvade. The music was composed by Vishal Mishra, Rajat Nagpal and Akashdeep Sengupta, while cinematography and editing were handled by G. Srinivas Reddy and Rajendra Bhaat.

Ruslaan was released on 26 April 2024 and received mixed reviews from critics.

== Premise ==
Ruslaan, the son of a terrorist, is adopted by ATS officer Sameer Singh. Ruslaan, in order to clear his stigma of being a terrorist's son, joins RAW without Sameer's knowledge. Ruslaan's intense urge to do the right thing often leads him into complex and dangerous situations.

== Cast ==
- Aayush Sharma as Ruslaan
- Sushrii Shreya Mishraa as Vaani
- Jagapathi Babu as ATS officer Sameer Singh
- Vidya Malvade as Mantra
- Beena Banerjee as Aabha Paatil
- Sal Yusuf as Ozan
- Sangay Tsheltrim as Lee
- Aruna Beniwal as Saba
- Jaswinder Gardner as Manju
- Nawab Shah as Abdul Rashid
- Suniel Shetty as Shinoy(Cameo)
- Zaheer Iqbal as Raheel
- Aman Kanojia as Cab Driver

== Production ==
=== Casting ===
The film was initially titled as AS04 and stars Aayush Sharma in the titular role. Sushrii Shreya Mishraa plays the female lead, while Jagapathi Babu plays a pivotial role in the film.

== Soundtrack ==
The music was composed by Vishal Mishra, while the lyrics were written by Shabbir Ahmed.

Track listing
No.	Title	Lyrics	Music	Singer(s)	Length
1.	"Roar of Ruslaan"	Mellow D	Rajat Nagpal	Mellow D	3.02
2.	"Taade"	Shabbir Ahmed	Vishal Mishra	Vishal Mishra	2.58
3.	"Dil Phisal Gaya"	Rana Sotal	Rajat Nagpal	Vishal Dadlani	2.21
4.	"Pehla Ishq"	Rana Sotal	Rajat Nagpal	Rito Riba	2.48
5.	"Dua-e-Khair"	Bipin Das	Rajat Nagpal	Divya Kumar	5.26
Total length:					15.55

== Release ==
=== Theatrical ===
Ruslaan was scheduled to release on 12 January 2024, but was postponed. The film was released on 26 April 2024. The theatrical rights of the film were acquired by NH Studioz.

=== Home media ===
The digital rights of the film were acquired by JioCinema. The film streamed in JioCinema on 21 September 2024.

== Reception ==
Titas Chowdhary of News18 gave 3.5/5 stars and wrote "Despite its idiosyncrasies, Ruslaan entertains because it is unapologetic in its appeal. Aayush Sharma manages to carry the film comfortably on his shoulders." Riya Sharma of DNA India gave 3.5/5 stars and wrote "Aayush Sharma impresses with his top-notch action sequences in Karan Butani's Ruslaan. It is a film that has all the essential ingredients of an action entertainer."

Arushi Jain of India Today gave 3/5 stars and wrote "While Ruslaan had the potential to be an engaging drama like Mission Kashmir or a cat-and-mouse chase like Tiger and Pathaan, it missed the mark."

Ronak Kotecha of The Times of India gave 2.5/5 stars and wrote "Ruslaan focuses heavily on pandering to the masses with a relentless dose of action and thrill but not much logic. It’s a formulaic actioner that is entertaining in parts if you prefer adrenaline over intricate plots." Vinamra Mathur of Firstpost gave 2.5/5 stars and termed that the film is forgettable, but not without its guilty pleasures.

Rishil Jogani of Pinkvilla gave 2.5/5 stars and wrote "Ruslaan has good, watchable action and few scenes succeed to grab the attention of the viewers. Apart from that, there's nothing much that goes in favour of the film."

Shubham Kulkarni of OTTplay gave 2/5 stars and wrote "Ruslaan suffers because it uses a formula that is used by many others and there is only a certain way it can be redone now without feeling mundane. Aayush Sharma indeed has a lot of potential, but these are not the projects that will bring that out." Rohit Bhatnagar of The Free Press Journal gave 2/5 stars and wrote "Ruslaan is a showreel of Aayush Sharma’s talent and nothing beyond that"

Saibal Chatterjee of NDTV gave 1.5/5 stars and wrote "It has action, music, emotions and a whole lot of hollow rhetoric and bravado, all crammed into two hours of relentless overdrive." Shubhra Gupta of The Indian Express wrote "Aayush Sharma film takes you back to the era when Bollywood flicks didn’t really bother about coherent plots as long as there were enough formulaic set-pieces."
