= Purva Rana =

Purva Rana Parikh
- Born: Purva Rana; 12 February 1991 (age 35); Dharamshala, Himachal Pradesh, India
- Occupation: model
- Height: 1.75 m (5 ft 9 in)
- Spouse: Shrenik Parikh
- Beauty pageant titleholder
- Title: Vice Queen United Continent 2013
- Hair color: Brown
- Eye color: Brown
- Major competitions: Femina Miss India 2011; (Top 10); Femina Miss India 2012; (Top 10); Miss Tourism World 2012; (1st runner up); Miss United Continents 2013; (Vice-Queen)

Purva Rana (born 12 February 1991) is an Indian actress, model and beauty pageant titleholder who was crowned Femina Miss India 2012 1st runner up and was later crowned Femina Miss India United Continents 2012. She represented India at Miss United Continents 2013 pageant and was crowned as Vice Queen of Miss United Continents 2013 on 14 September 2013. She was previously crowned as first Runner up at Miss Tourism International 2012 pageant.

== Early life ==
Born in Himachal Pradesh, India. Rana speaks Hindi and English. She was a student of Electronic engineering at Himachal Pradesh Technical University.

== Pageants ==
Rana, who stands 1.75 m (5 ft 9 in) tall, competed as a representative of Himachal Pradesh, one of 20 contestants in her country's national beauty pageant, Femina Miss India, on 30 March 2012, where she obtained the Miss Dream Girl 2012 award, and was placed in the top five. She also won Miss Himachal crown in 2010.

On 19 December 2012 Rana represented India at the Miss Tourism 2012 pageant in Bangkok, Thailand. She placed as first runner-up.

On 14 September 2013 Rana was crowned as Vice Queen United Continent 2013 pageant in Guayaquil, Ecuador.

== Filmography ==
Key
†	Denotes films that have not yet been released

Year	Title	Role	Language	Note
2018	Pagalpanti	Roshni Tendulkar	Gujarati	
2019	LuvUturn		Hindi	

Awards and achievements
Preceded by -First Winner	Femina Miss United Continent India; 2013	Succeeded by Gail Nicole Da Silva
Preceded by -First Winner	Miss United Continents; 2013; Vice Queen	Succeeded by Wilmayerlin Nava Marquez
