= Bugadi Maazi Sandli Ga =

- Directed by: Mansingh Pawar
- Starring: Kashyap Parulekar; Manasi Moghe; Mohan Joshi; Deepa Chaphekar
- Cinematography: Raja Fatdare
- Music by: Pravin Kuwar; Babhru Bhosale; Sachin Desai; Dipesh Desai
- Release date: 13 March 2015
- Country: India
- Language: Marathi

Bugadi Maazi Sandli Ga is an Indian Marathi language film directed by Mansingh Pawar. The film starring Kashyap Parulekar, Manasi Moghe and Mohan Joshi. The film was released on 13 March 2015.

== Synopsis ==
The film tells the love story of Indrajit Mohite and Shubhangi. Indrajit has been studying music in America for 10 years. Due to the insistence of his parents, he returns to India. His father wants him to manage his business empire; But he wants to work in music. Indrajit, a connoisseur of world music, explores Lavani. He comes across the explorer Chandraprabha Sanglikar. There he meets Shubhangi. Both of them live in Raosaheb Shinde's haveli. Both are in love. Marriage is opposed. He fades away. Meanwhile, Raosaheb who lives in Indore comes to the haveli. They try to get Shubhangi by insulting Chandraprabha. They also agree to Indrajit and Shubhangi's marriage. This straightforward story takes a twist and the wedding does not take place. Indrajit goes to jail.

== cast ==
- kashyap parulekar
- Manasi Moghe
- Mohan Joshi
- Deepa chaphekar
- Ramesh bhatkar
- Ela bhate

== Soundtrack ==
Bugadi Maazi Sandli Ga

Soundtrack album by Pravin Kuwar, Babhru Bhosale, Sachin Desai and Dipesh Desai
- Released: 2015
- Recorded: 2015
- Genre: Feature film soundtrack
- Length: 42:54
- Language: Marathi

Official audio
- Bugadi Maazi Sandli Ga – Full Album on YouTube

Track listing
No.	Title	Singer(s)	Length
1.	"Loota Tumhi Aivaj Ishkacha"	Bela Shende	5:15
2.	"Mazi Haravali Bugadi"	Bela Shende	5:11
3.	"Tuze Naav Aata"	Jasraj Joshi	5:35
4.	"Mala Kalat Nahi Rajasa"	Bela Shende	4:24
5.	"Baghun Mala Zala Panvna Yeda"	Bela Shende	4:00
6.	"Dajiba Ho Maza Dadla"	Bharat Madhavi	5:18
7.	"O Pavna Jara Daman Kadha Kadi"	Urmila Dhangar	4:49
8.	"Bai Ga Annadachya Khani"	Bharat Madhavi, Sanchita Morajkar	4:50
9.	"Raya Mala Tumhavinha Karmat naay"	Bela Shende	4:52
Total length:			42:54

== Critical reception ==
Bugadi Majhi Sandli Ga movie received nigetive reviews from critics. Mihir Bhanage of The Times of India gave the film 2 stars out of 5 and wrote "The songs are nice and some parts of the movie are good. Other than that it’s a film that turns out to be just average". Rohan Juvekar of Maharashtra Times gave the film 2 stars out of 5 and Says"Overall, the spectacle has come after a long time. Those who want something different after seeing something different all the time should not mind watching this movie. If there is a preparation for 'pink wounds on the body', then it is done!". Ganesh Matkari of Pune Mirror wrote "Actors range from very good (Joshi) to reasonably okay (Moghe) but all of them give a strictly average performance, which has to be blamed on the director. He seems to have given them no actual direction, and each of them channels the conventions of their role types in the best possible way". A Reviewer of Zee Talkies says "As far as the performances of the artistes goes, Manasi Moghe makes a successful debut with her notable performance. Choreographer Deepali Vichare seems to have worked very hard in getting the best out of her. Kashyap Parulekar has also played the lover boy very well. Good support comes from all senior artistes in the film".
