= Ayeesha Aiman =

Indian actress and Miss India (born 1996)

- Born: Ayeesha S. Aiman; 19 September 1990 (age 35); Nawada, Bihar, India
- Education: Institution of Engineers (B.E.); Indian Institute of Aeronautics (B.E.)
- Occupations: Actress, model, aeronautical engineer
- Height: 1.73 m (5 ft 8 in)
- Beauty pageant titleholder
- Title: Miss India International 2015
- Years active: 2015 to present

Ayeesha S. Aiman (born 19 September 1990) is an Indian actress, model, beauty pageant titleholder. She was crowned Miss India International 2015 and she represented India at Miss International 2015 pageant held in Tokyo, Japan. She made her acting debut in a Bollywood film India Lockdown by National award-winning director Madhur Bhandarkar. Ayeesha S Aiman played her first lead role Randeep Hooda starrer web series Inspector Avinash, where Ayeesha played gorgeous modern-day royal princess in the series presented by Jio Studios. Ayeesha will be seen in another web series AK47 where she is leading the series.

== Biography ==
Aiman was born on 19 September 1990 in Nawada district of Bihar.

== Pageantry ==
She was awarded Panasonic Beauty Ambassador for the year 2015 award by the Panasonic organisation and Miss Visit Japan Tourism Ambassador by the Japan Tourism and International Cultural association at Miss International pageant. Supriya Aiman was awarded Asia Star Model award in South Korea, Seoul in the year of 2018 may in Asia Model Festival irrespective of her contribution in The modelling industry.

=== Glamanand Supermodel India 2015 ===
In October 2015, she was chosen by the Glamanand Supermodel India to represent India at Miss International 2015 held in Tokyo, Japan. She succeeded Jhataleka Malhotra as Miss International India.

=== Miss International 2015 ===
She represented India at the Miss International 2015 pageant held Tokyo, Japan from 16 October to 5 November and was awarded as Panasonic Beauty Ambassador of the year 2015 by Panasonic and Visit Japan Tourism Ambassador by Japan Tourism.

== Filmography ==
=== Films ===
Key
†	Denotes films that have not yet been released

Year	Title	Role	Language	Notes	Ref.
2022	India Lockdown	Kamli	Hindi	Released on ZEE5	
2023	Inspector Avinash	Nandini	Hindi	Web series; Released on JioCinema and JioHotstar	
TBA	Miss Massakali Tripathi†	Kalli Tripathi	Hindi		

Awards and achievements
Preceded by Jhataleka Malhotra	Miss India International; 2015	Succeeded by Rewati Chetri
Preceded by First Glamanand Miss India International	Glamanand Miss India International; 2015	Incumbent
