= The Frank Anthony Public School, Bengaluru =

The Frank Anthony Public School

Location
- 13, Cambridge Road, Ulsoor, Bangalore – 560 008; India; 12.9711°N 77.6287°E

Information
- Type: Private school
- Motto: "Courage is destiny"
- Established: 9 January 1967
- Founder: Mr. Frank Anthony
- School board: Council for The ISC Examinations
- Chairman: David Hilton
- Principal: Kevin Pope
- Headmistress: Lorraine Briggs
- Vice-Principal: Craig William Temple
- Faculty: Full-time
- Grades: K-12
- Gender: Co-educational
- Age: 4 to 18
- Language: English (Medium of instruction) Kannada, Hindi, Sanskrit
- Houses: Corbett House , D'mello House , Gidney House , Rodrigues House
- Song: Courage is Destiny!
- Website: fapsbangalore.org

The Frank Anthony Public School (or FAPS) is a co-educational day-school, for students of age 4–18 years, in Bangalore, India. It was founded in 1967 by the Anglo-Indian educationist and barrister-at-law, Frank Anthony, who was also the Founder-Chairman of the All India Anglo-Indian Educational Trust which, today, owns and administers five schools named after him, including The Frank Anthony Public School, New Delhi, The Frank Anthony Public School, Bengaluru, The Frank Anthony Public School, Kolkata and three Frank Anthony Junior Schools in the cities of Bangalore, Kolkata and Delhi.

== Overview ==
The school officially opened on 9 January 1967, being the third of the three Frank Anthony Public Schools in India. It is established, owned and administered by the All-India Anglo-Indian Education Institution, New Delhi, registered under the Societies Registration Act XXI of 1860. It is affiliated to the Council for the Indian School Certificate Examinations.

The school is divided into the Nursery Section, the Junior Section and the Senior Section. Each class has three sections in the Junior section, and five in the senior section. Before 2017, there were four in the senior section. Students of classes 11 and 12 are divided into three sections:

1. Science (English, Physics, Chemistry, Mathematics/Psychology, Biology/Computer Applications),
2. Commerce (English, Commerce, Accounts, Economics, Sociology/Second Language)
3. Humanities (English, Literature in English, second language, History, Sociology, Political Science).

The student count from Nursery to the Class XII is above 2000.

== Terms ==
There are two academic terms in the year:

- First Term (late May to late September/early October)
- Second Term (early October to early April)

The second term is split into half by two and a half weeks of Christmas vacation. Summer vacation lasts from early April till late May, during the warmest part of the year in Southern India. There is a week off for Dasara, around late September or early October.

== Houses ==
The House system is a feature common to Public Schools in India (based on an equivalent system in England). FAPS has four houses, named after eminent members of the Anglo-Indians and benefactors of the school. Each house is represented by a colour and a motto that defines the House's identity.

=== House structure ===
Each house is led by two House Captains (a boy and a girl), two Vice-Captains (a boy and a girl), and a body of prefects, selected from among the students of Class XII.

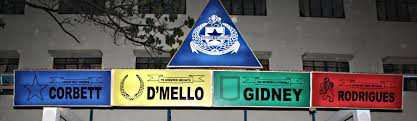
The 4 houses with the school emblem.

Corbett House

- Colour : Blue
- Motto: "Deeds not Words"

D'mello House

- Colour : Yellow
- Motto : "To Greater Heights"

Gidney House

- Colour : Green
- Motto : "The Impossible is Possible"

Rodrigues House

- Colour : Red
- Motto : "Strive and Attain"

The houses compete in inter-house activities, including sports (such as cricket, basketball, football, volleyball, and throwball), athletics, quizzes, debates, and elocution competitions.

== Facilities ==
The school has a playground where sports like cricket, football, hockey, and other field sports are played. Basketball, throwball, and volleyball courts are available. In academics, there are labs for physics, chemistry, biology, computer science, and home science.

In 2017, a multipurpose hall was constructed.

== Clubs ==
The school offers for its students to engage and participate in various clubs that are considered a vital part of overall education. The clubs present in the school are:

1. Interact Club
2. Pen & Ink Club
3. The Model United Nations Club
4. Hindi Sahitya Sabha
5. Kannada Sahitya Sabha
6. Cookery Club
7. FACC (Cultural Club)

The Frank Anthony Public School also has its own brass band and choir, headed by Mr. Narayanaswamy, that are regarded among the best in the country. The band and choir have performed at various prestigious events and venues, one of them being the Raj Bhavan, Bangalore.

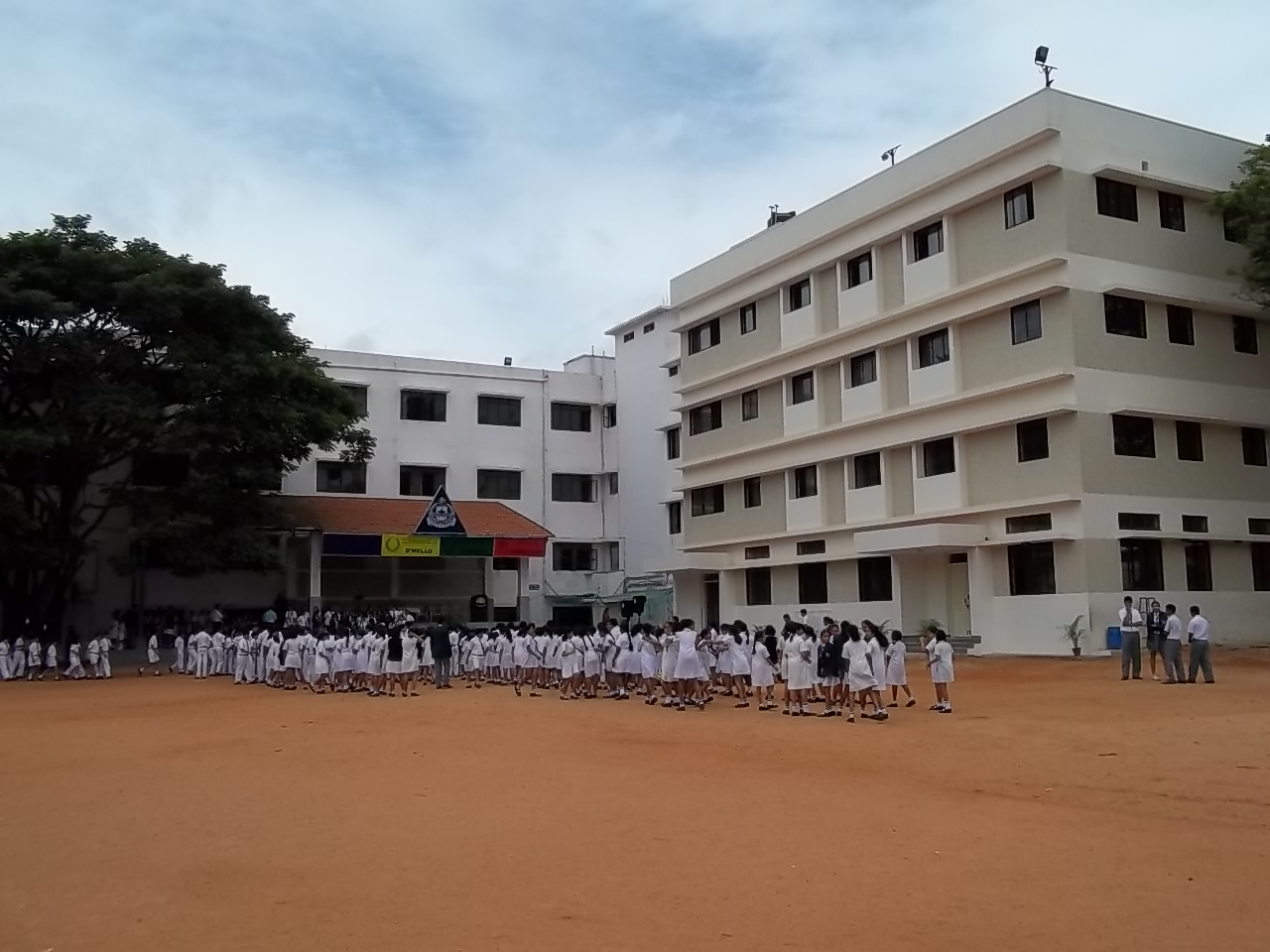
The view of the school buildings from the school playground.

== Tournaments ==
An inter-school girls throwball tournament is held every year in the month of August.

=== Tri-Faps ===
Every year an inter-school tournament, Tri-Faps is conducted in one of the three Frank Anthony Public Schools across the country. The last Tri-Faps conducted at Bangalore was in 2023, with recurrences every year, in one of the three Frank Anthony Public School campuses.

== Heads ==
=== Principals ===
- C.W. Eastwood
- T.E. Allan
- E. McGready
- G.W. Mayer
- A.J. Wood
- V.E. Simcock
- Christopher Anthony Browne
- Keith Vivian Boye
- Kevin Dominic Pope (current)

=== Headmasters/Vice-Principals ===
The headmaster was in charge of the Senior section which includes classes 6 to 10 and the ISC grades. The office of Headmaster was renamed Vice-Principal in 2015.

- Keith Vivian Boye
- O.E. Fernandez
- Christopher Anthony Browne
- Kevin Dominic Pope
- Edwin Flynn
- Christina Lewis
- Craig William Temple (Current)

=== Headmistresses ===
The headmistress is in charge of the Junior section which includes the Nursery, Preparatory and classes 1 to 8.

- Lynn Cabral
- *Catrina Hastings
- Lorraine Briggs (current)

== Notable alumni ==
- Pankaj Arjan Advani, snooker Champion
- Divya Gokulnath, Educator and Co-Founder of Byju's
- Lara Dutta, Actress and Miss Universe 2000
- Major Sandeep Unnikrishnan, AC, National Security Guard
- Aditi Ashok, Professional Golfer & Olympian
- Danish Sait, Actor
- Stuart Binny, cricketer, India/Karnataka/Royal Challengers Bangalore (Indian Premier League)
- Arun Shenoy, musician, 2013 Grammy Award nominee
- Karun Nair, Cricketer, India/Karnataka/Delhi Daredevils (Indian Premier League)
- Shreyas Gopal, Cricketer, Karnataka/Mumbai Indians (Indian Premier League)
- Anaitha Nair, Actress, Singer
- Abbas, Actor
- Noyonita Lodh, Model and Miss Diva Universe 2014
- Gautam Sharma, TV actor and Model
- Barrington Rowland, Cricketer, Karnataka
- Kanan Gill, Stand-Up Comedian, Actor

== See also ==
- The Frank Anthony Public School, New Delhi
