= Noyonita Lodh =

Indian beauty pageant winner (born 1993)

- Born: Bengaluru, Karnataka, India
- Education: St. Joseph's College of Commerce, Bengaluru; The Frank Anthony Public School, Bangalore
- Beauty pageant titleholder
- Title: Miss Diva Universe 2014
- Major competitions: Miss Diva 2014; (Winner – Miss Diva Universe 2014); (Miss Catwalk); Miss Universe 2014; (Top 15)
- Website: web.archive.org/web/20150109210001/http://www.noyonitalodh.com/%20Official%20Website

Noyonita Lodh is an Indian beauty pageant titleholder who won Miss Diva Universe 2014 and represented India at Miss Universe 2014 in Doral, Florida, United States on 25 January 2015 where she placed in the Top 15.

== Early life ==
Noyonita Lodh was born in Bengaluru, India. She was schooled at The Frank Anthony Public School, Bengaluru Her higher education was from St. Joseph's College of Commerce, Bengaluru.

== Pageantry ==
=== MAX Miss Bangalore 2011 ===
Lodh was second runner-up at Miss Bangalore 2011, and also won the Miss Catwalk award.

=== Miss Diva 2014 ===
Lodh won Miss Diva Universe 2014 and was crowned by the inaugural titleholder Manasi Moghe. She also won the Miss Catwalk award.

=== Miss Universe 2014 ===
Lodh represented India at Miss Universe 2014 held at Doral, Florida, USA on 25 January 2015, and reached the top 15. She was also in the top five in the Best National Costume round. Her national costume design was by Neeta Lulla

Awards and achievements
Preceded by Manasi Moghe	India's Representative at Miss Universe; 2014	Succeeded by Urvashi Rautela
Preceded by Manasi Moghe	Miss Diva Universe; 2014	Succeeded by Urvashi Rautela
