= Pagalpanti (2018 film) =

2018 Indian Gujarati language comedy film

- Film poster
- Directed by: Jakee Patel
- Written by: Jakee Patel; Irshad Dalal
- Produced by: Jakee Patel; Jimmy Asija; Hiren Khunt
- Starring: Rahul Dev; Mukul Dev; Ali Asgar; Purva Rana; Bhavik Bhojak
- Cinematography: Raju Badiger
- Edited by: Jagesh singh
- Music by: Ronak Raval; Raju Sardar; Anwar Shaik
- Release date: 1 June 2018
- Running time: 147 minutes
- Country: India
- Language: Gujarati

Pagalpanti is a 2018 Indian Gujarati-language comedy film directed by Jakee Patel featuring Rahul Dev, Mukul Dev, Ali AsgarPurva Rana and Bhavik Bhojak. The film was released on 1 Jun, 2018. Foram Mehta and Dinesh Lamba play supporting roles in the film.

== Plot ==
This comedy-drama centers on a group of individuals from different Indian states who meet for the first time during a tour. Due to cultural and regional differences, conflicts frequently arise among them. Some of the husbands neglect their wives and attempt to flirt with other’s wives, particularly showing interest in three foreign women who have also joined the tour. The film combines elements of comedy and drama, presented in the Gujarati language drama.

== Cast ==
- Mahesh Manjrekar as Inspector Singh
- Sonu Sood as Jeeva
- Rahul Dev as Kazaam
- Mukul Dev as Inspector Ram Sharma
- Ali Asgar as Chhoti Goli
- Bhavik Bhojak as Anthony Goli
- Ashish Lal as Lakhan (Inspector Laxman Pandey)
- Purva Rana as Roshni Tendulkar
- Amanda Rosario as Jacqueline
- Sumit Sarkar as Sujoy Mukherjee
- Dinesh Lamba as Harbhajan Singh
- Sunil Vishrani as Kantibhai Shah
- Jay Vijay Sachan as Rocky
- Muni Jha as Vasudev
- Hemant Jha as Prakash Rao
- Sahil Kohli as Rishi
- Amanda Rosario as Jaqueline
- Jitu Mehta as Periaswamy
- Sheetal Suvarna as Mrs. Preeto Harbhajan Singh
- Sujata Thakkar as Mrs. Rupal Kantibhai Shah
- Hemang Dave as Rustam
- Nimesh Dilip Rai as Retd. Col. Ashok Tendulkar
- Krupa Chandera as Mrs. Nandini Mukherjee
- Foram Mehta as Mrs. Madhubala Swamy
- Maulik Chauhan as Akbar Goli
- Nirali Joshi as Basanti (Chhoti Goli Gang Member)
- Hiren Khunt as Tom
- Ravi Ratan as Karan
- Hitarth Asija as Inspector's Son
- Rohit Gida as Max
- Abhilash Shah as Inspector Abhilash (Mumbai Police)
- Vijay as Sharib
- Satish Asija as Minister
- Jimmy Asija as Senior Inspector
- Aasnhi as Resort Receptionist-1
- Luisa as Resort Receptionist-2
- Shiv & Jash Dave as Kids at School
- Aditya Sani
- Abhay Goswami
- Kalpesh Prajapati
- Varun
- Jaimin Panchal
- Madhav
- Omkar Gajjar
- Manindar Singh
- Alok Mani Mishra
- Manish Balwani
