= Miss Diva 2013 =

1st edition of Miss Diva

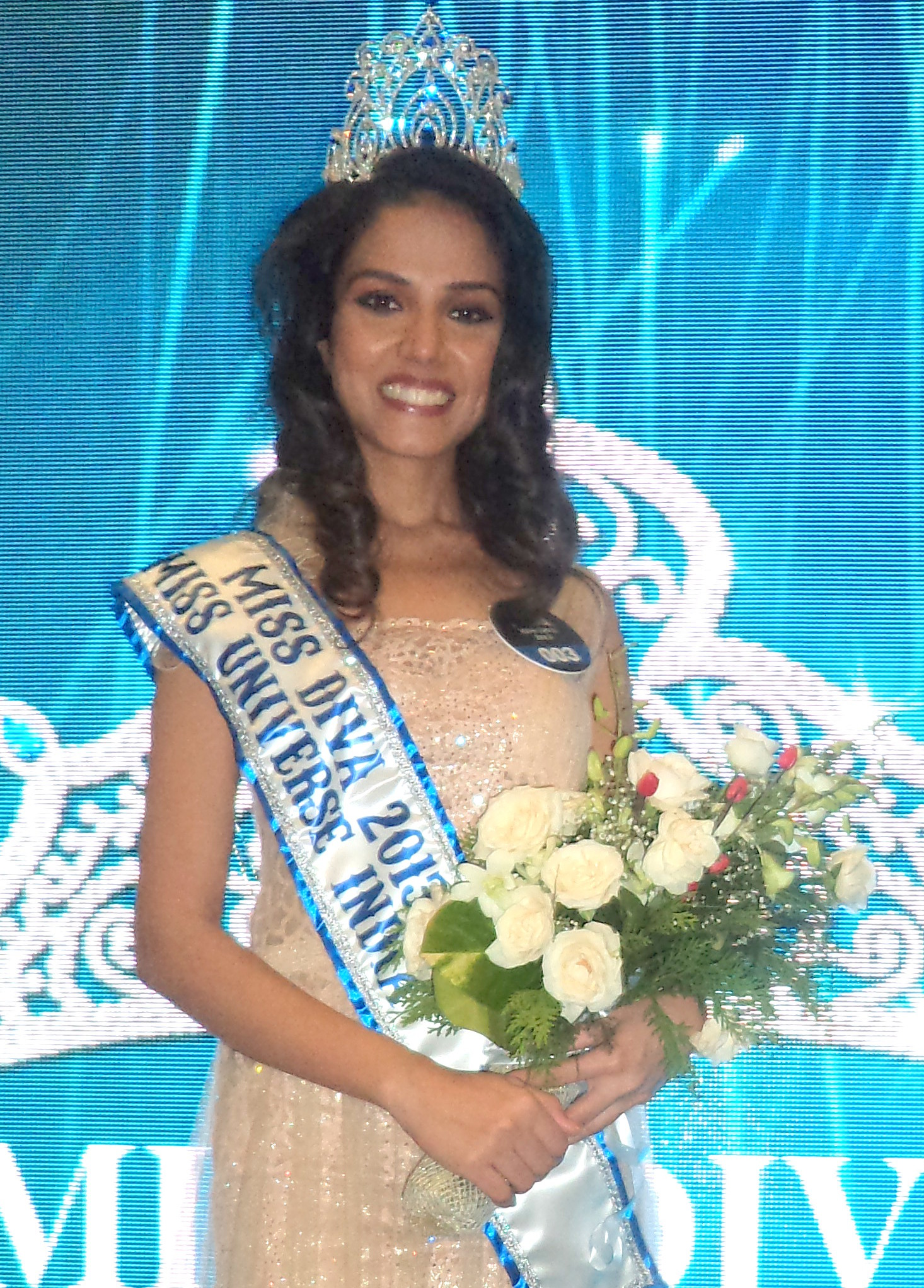
- Manasi Moghe
- Date: September 5, 2013
- Presenters: Vivan Bhatena; Mantra
- Venue: Westin Mumbai Garden City, Mumbai, Maharashtra, India
- Broadcaster: Colors
- Entrants: 14
- Placements: 7
- Debuts: Andhra Pradesh, Bihar, Chandigarh, Delhi, Goa, Haryana, Karnataka, Madhya Pradesh, Maharashtra, National Capital City, Odisha, Punjab, Tamil Nadu, West Bengal
- Winner: Manasi Moghe; Madhya Pradesh
- Photogenic: Jhataleka Malhotra

Miss Diva was introduced by Femina to select a candidate to represent India at Miss Universe (in contrast to Femina Miss India, also owned by Femina, which selects a candidate as a delegate for Miss World).

The first edition of Miss Diva was held at Westin Mumbai Garden City, Mumbai on September 5, 2013. 14 contestants vied for the crown. Manasi Moghe was crowned the winner, Gurleen Grewal 1st Runner Up and Srishti Rana 2nd Runner Up.

As the winner of Miss Diva 2013, Manasi Moghe represented India at Miss Universe 2013 held in Russia where she made it to the Top 10. Gurleen Grewal represented India at Miss International 2013 held in Japan where she did not place. Srishti Rana represented India at Miss Asia Pacific World 2013 held in South Korea where she was crowned the winner.

== Final results ==
Color keys

- The contestant Won in an International pageant.
- The contestant was a Runner-up in an International pageant.
- The contestant was a Semi-Finalist in an International pageant.
- Unplaced

| Final Results | Candidate | International Placement |
|---|---|---|
| Miss Universe India 2013 | Manasi Moghe | Top 10 |
| Miss Diva International 2013 | Gurleen Grewal | Unplaced |
| Miss Diva Asia Pacific World 2013 | Srishti Rana | Miss Asia Pacific World 2013 |
| Top 5 | Shruti Tuli; Jhataleka Malhotra | |
| Top 7 | Sukanya Bhattacharya; Sushrii Shreya Mishraa^{*} | |

^{*}Won Top 7 semifinalist spot by winning Miss Digital Title.

=== Special Awards ===
| Award | Contestant |
|---|---|
| Miss Beautiful Eyes | Yashna Khurana |
| Miss Digital crown | Sushrii Shreya Mishraa |
| Miss Perfect Body | Preeti Chauhan |
| Miss Photogenic | Jhataleka Malhotra |
| Miss Popular award | Sonika Chauhan |
| Miss Runway | Nischitha Rao |
| Miss Times Sudoku title | Seep Taneja |

== Judges ==
- Zeenat Aman - Miss Asia Pacific 1970 and Bollywood actress
- Jacqueline Fernandez - Miss Universe Sri Lanka 2006, model and Bollywood actress
- Sahar Biniaz - Miss Universe Canada 2012, model and Bollywood actress
- Malaika Arora - Model and Bollywood actress
- Raveena Tandon - Model and Bollywood actress
- Kunal Kapoor - Model and Bollywood actor
- Atul Kasbekar - Famous Indian Photographer

== Contestants ==
| Representing | Contestant | Age | Height | Hometown |
|---|---|---|---|---|
| Andhra Pradesh | Seep Taneja | | 1.75 m (5 ft 9 in) | Jalandhar |
| Bihar | Sukanya Bhattacharya | 20 | 1.73 m (5 ft 8 in) | Patna |
| Punjab | Gurleen Grewal | 21 | 1.78 m (5 ft 10 in) | Jalandhar |
| Delhi | Trishla Chandola | 23 | 1.73 m (5 ft 8 in) | New Delhi |
| Goa | Sonika Chauhan | 24 | 1.70 m (5 ft 7 in) | Kolkata |
| Haryana | Srishti Rana | 20 | 1.73 m (5 ft 8 in) | Faridabad |
| Karnataka | Nischitha Rao | 22 | 1.80 m (5 ft 11 in) | Bangalore |
| Madhya Pradesh | Manasi Moghe | 21 | 1.76 m (5 ft 9 1/2 in) | Indore |
| Maharashtra | Jhataleka Malhotra | 19 | 1.74 m (5 ft 8 1/2 in) | Mumbai |
| National Capital City | Yashna Khurana | 21 | 1.75 m (5 ft 9 in) | New Delhi |
| Odisha | Sushrii Shreya Mishraa | 22 | 1.75 m (5 ft 9 in) | Sambalpur |
| Punjab | Shruti Tuli | 19 | 1.78 m (5 ft 10 in) | Amritsar |
| Tamil Nadu | Preeti Chauhan | 26 | 1.73 m (5 ft 8 in) | Mumbai |
| West Bengal | Sona Goldar | 23 | 1.78 m (5 ft 10 in) | Kolkata |

== Contestants notes ==
- Sushrii Shreya Mishraa later became Femina Miss India United Continent 2015.
- Sukanya Bhattacharya later became Indian Princess Tourism International 2015.
- Srishti Rana was the finalist of Femina Miss India 2013(Top 5), she was also Runner-up Pond's Femina Miss India Delhi 2013 (Second runner-up).
- Srishti Rana and Yashna Khurana were winners of Miss India Diva 2013 Delhi.
- Jhataleka Malhotra later became Femina Miss India International 2014
- Shruti Tuli was First finalist of Miss India Diva 2013 Chandigarh.
- Sona Goldar was the winner of Miss India Diva 2013 Kolkata.
- Trishla Chandola was the winner of Miss India Diva 2013 Bangalore.
- Sukanya Bhattacharya was the finalist of Femina Miss India 2013 and awarded MISS DANCING QUEEN.
- Preeti Chauhan was the finalist of I AM She 2012.(Top 10)
- Manasi Moghe was the finalist of Femina Miss India 2013 and awarded MISS ACTIVE Subtitle in PFMI 2013.
- Seep Taneja was the contestant of I AM She 2011.

== Crossovers ==
- Femina Miss India
  - 2013 - Srishti Rana - (Finalist, Miss Fashion Icon)
  - 2013 - Manasi Moghe (Miss Active)
  - 2013 - Sukanya Bhattacharya (Miss Dancing Queen)
  - 2014 - Jhataleka Malhotra (Femina Miss India International 2014)
  - 2015 - Sushrii Shreya Mishraa (Femina Miss India United Continent 2015, Miss Rampwalk, Miss Vivacious)
- Indian Princess
  - 2015 - Sukanya Bhattacharya (Indian Princess Tourism International 2015, Miss Photogenic)
- I Am She - Miss Universe India
  - 2011 - Seep Taneja
  - 2011 - Trishla Chandola
  - 2012 - Preeti Chauhan (Top 10)
- Asian Supermodel India
  - 2010 - Sushrii Shreya Mishraa (Winner)
