= Koyal Rana =

Indian model (born 1993)

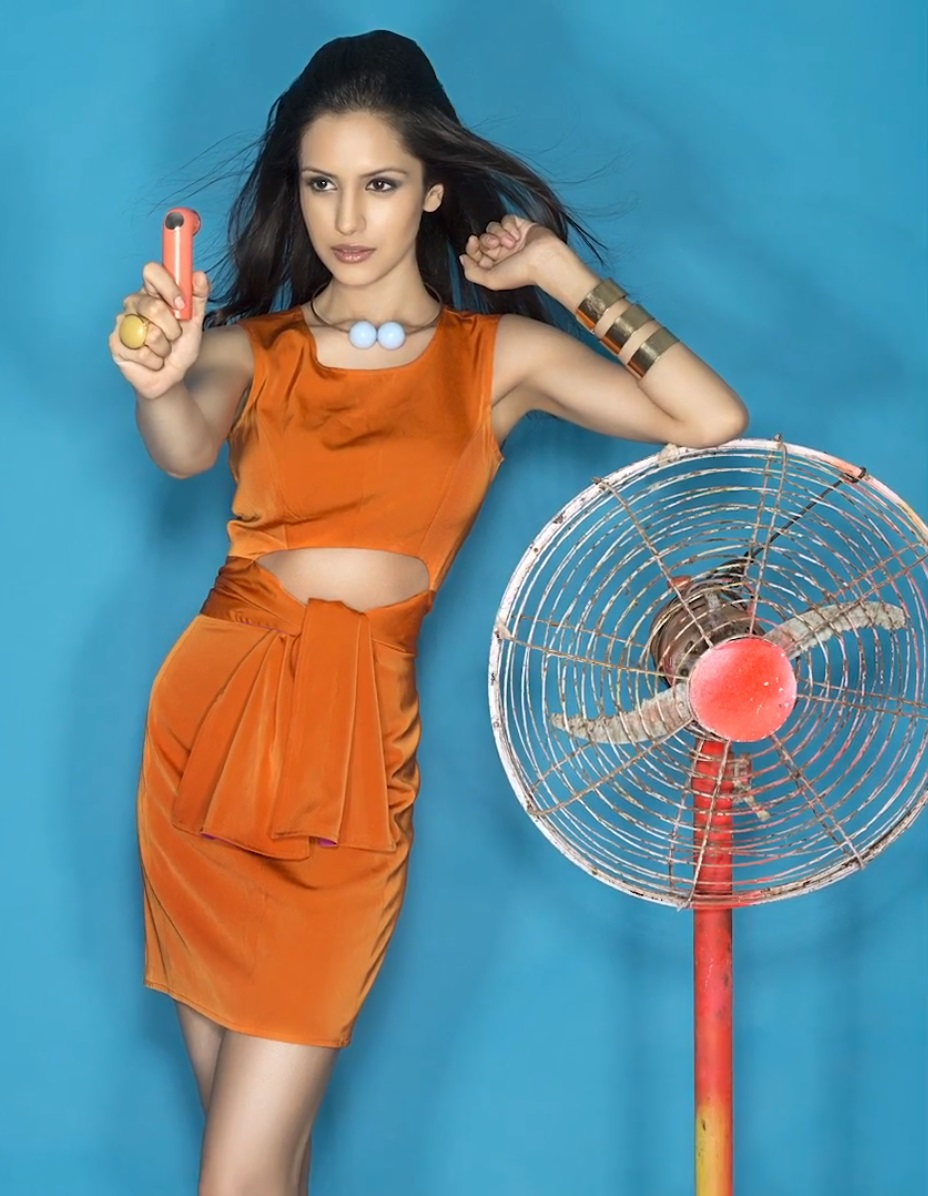
- Rana in 2015
- Born: 4 January 1993 (age 33); Jaipur, Rajasthan, India
- Height: 1.73 m (5 ft 8 in)
- Spouse: Ayush Dabas (m.2020)
- Beauty pageant titleholder
- Title: Femina Miss India 2014
- Years active: 2008 - 2015
- Eye color: Black
- Major competitions: Femina Miss India Delhi 2014 (Winner); Femina Miss India 2014 (Winner); Miss World 2014 (Miss World Asia & Ocenia)

Koyal Rana (born 4 January 1993) is an Indian former beauty pageant titleholder who was crowned Femina Miss India 2014 and represented India at Miss World 2014 held in London.

== Early life and education ==
Rana completed her schooling at St. Thomas' School (New Delhi) and went to pursue graduation from Deen Dayal Upadhyaya College.

== Pageantry ==
=== Femina Miss India 2014 ===
Koyal Rana was crowned the 51st Femina Miss India World 2014, on 5 April 2014, at a ceremony in Mumbai. Before entering Miss India, she participated in Femina Miss India Delhi 2014 pageant and was declared the winner and got a direct entry into the Miss India 2014 pageant.

=== Miss World 2014 ===
After winning the title of Femina Miss India World 2014, she represented India at Miss World 2014, the 64th edition of the Miss World pageant. She bagged highest placement from the Asian continent and the second Continental Queen of Asia from India after Miss World 2008.

== TEDx Speaker ==
Koyal was also one of the speakers on the theme 'Zoom Out' for second edition of TEDx IMI New Delhi and TEDx IIM Raipur on the theme 'Infinite Dimensions'.

Awards and achievements
Preceded by (India) Navneet Kaur Dhillon	Femina Miss India World; 2014	Succeeded by (India) Aditi Arya
