= Vanya Mishra =

Indian model and beauty queen

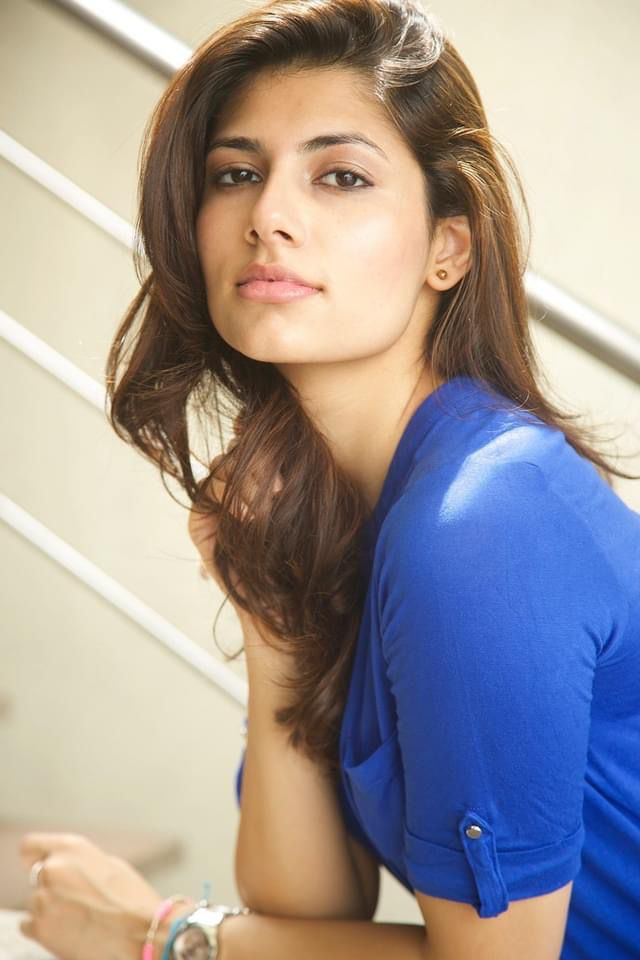
- Born: 27 February 1992 (age 34); Jalandhar, Punjab, India
- Education: IIM Ahmedabad, Punjab Engineering College
- Occupation: Entrepreneur
- Height: 172 cm (5 ft 8 in)
- Beauty pageant titleholder
- Title: Femina Miss India World 2012
- Major competitions: Femina Miss India World 2012 (Winner); Miss World 2012 (Top 7)

Vanya Mishra (born 27 February 1992) is an Indian technology entrepreneur, dancer, former actress and beauty pageant titleholder who was crowned Femina Miss India World 2012.

Vanya was born in Jalandhar, Punjab, and raised in Chandigarh. She studied electrical engineering at Punjab Engineering College. She represented India at the Miss World 2012 event in China in August 2012. She finished at 5th rank, and won two major subtitles out of six, Miss Multimedia and Miss Beauty with a Purpose.

She has been the co-founder and managing director at her fashion discovery portal, SummerLabel, launched on Android.

== Early life ==
Vanya Mishra was born on 27 February 1992 in Jalandhar, India. Her father was an Indian Army officer and mother an engineer and former school teacher. She did her schooling from Chandigarh and later attended Punjab Engineering College (PEC). She graduated in 2014 with a Bachelor of Engineering degree, and electrical engineering as her major. In 2022, she completed her MBA in general management from the Indian Institute of Management, IIM Ahmedabad.

== Miss India World 2012 ==
In January 2012, at 19 years of age, she was chosen as all India winner Miss Dabur Rose Glow after winning multiple state rounds, getting her an entry into top 20 of Femina Miss India 2012. On March 30, 2012, she was crowned winner of Pantaloons Femina Miss India World in a glittering ceremony in Mumbai, Maharashtra. The judging panel included famous names such as Ekta Kapoor, Sanjeev Bajaj, Sonu Nigam, Harbhajan Singh, Sakshi Tanwar, Rohit Shetty. She also won 3 major subtitles, Maybelline Most Beautiful eyes, Dabur Most Beautiful Skin and Most Photogenic. She was crowned by Former Miss World Ivian Sarcos of Venezuela.

== Miss World 2012 ==
In the same year, she went to represent India at the Miss World pageant held in Ordos, Inner Mongolia, China. There she competed with 120 global winners from across the world. She was placed in Top 7 along with South Sudan, Australia, Wales, Jamaica, PR China and Brazil. Wenxia Yu from PR China won the pageant.

== Work career ==
She has worked as a talent with Miss India organisation under The Times Group. She created SummerLabel, a fashion discovery marketplace with the idea of empowering young labels, merchants and smaller designers. The company received an angel funding. She continued being an entrepreneur till January 2017, after which she became a business executive.

== Awards ==
Vanya conferred with Most Distinguished Student Award by Punjab Engineering College. She received Kalpana Chawla Excellence Award in New Delhi. Hindustan Times rewarded her with young achievers award under HT 30 under 30. She was bestowed with Gr8! Women Achievers Award in Mumbai, televised on Colors channel. As a Miss India winner and entrepreneur she has been invited to various platforms to share her inspiring story and journey with future aspirants and leaders. She has been invited as chief guest at IIT Delhi, IIM Banaglore, IIT Roorkee, BITS-Pilani and more. She has traveled extensively throughout the country giving inspirational talks to young people as National Youth Ambassador, and judged various talent shows. She has traveled to various NIFD across India motivating young designers to foray into the world of fashion. Poets&Quants ranked her 2nd amongst top favourite 12 MBA candidates in the world in the year 2021-22.

Awards and achievements
Preceded by (India) Kanishtha Dhankar	Femina Miss India World; 2012	Succeeded by (India) Navneet Kaur Dhillon
Preceded by Astrid Ellena (Indonesia) and Stephanie Karikari (Ghana)	Miss World; Beauty with a Purpose; 2012	Succeeded by Ishani Shrestha (Nepal)
Preceded by -	Miss Multimedia; 2012	Succeeded by (India) Navneet Kaur Dhillon
