= Indian Institute of Aeronautics =

- इंडियन इन्स्टिट्यूट ऑफ एरोनॉटिक्स
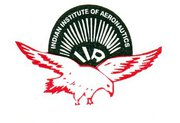
- Type: Govt.
- Established: 1982
- Affiliations: DGCA, EASA
- Chairman: Dr. J.K Sinha
- Location: New Delhi, IN
- Campus: Urban
- Nickname: IIA
- Website: http://www.iiagroup.co.in

Indian Institute Of Aeronautics (IIA) is one of the oldest aircraft maintenance training institutes in New Delhi, India. It was founded by avid aviator Captain Ram Niwas Sinha in 1982. In 1983 IIA earned approval from the Director General of Civil Aviation (DGCA), Govt. of India. IIA was transferred to Mundka, New Delhi from its initial approved base of Patna Airport in the year 2001. IIA is active in the field of Aircraft Maintenance Training through generations of trained technical manpower for the Airlines / Aviation Industry.

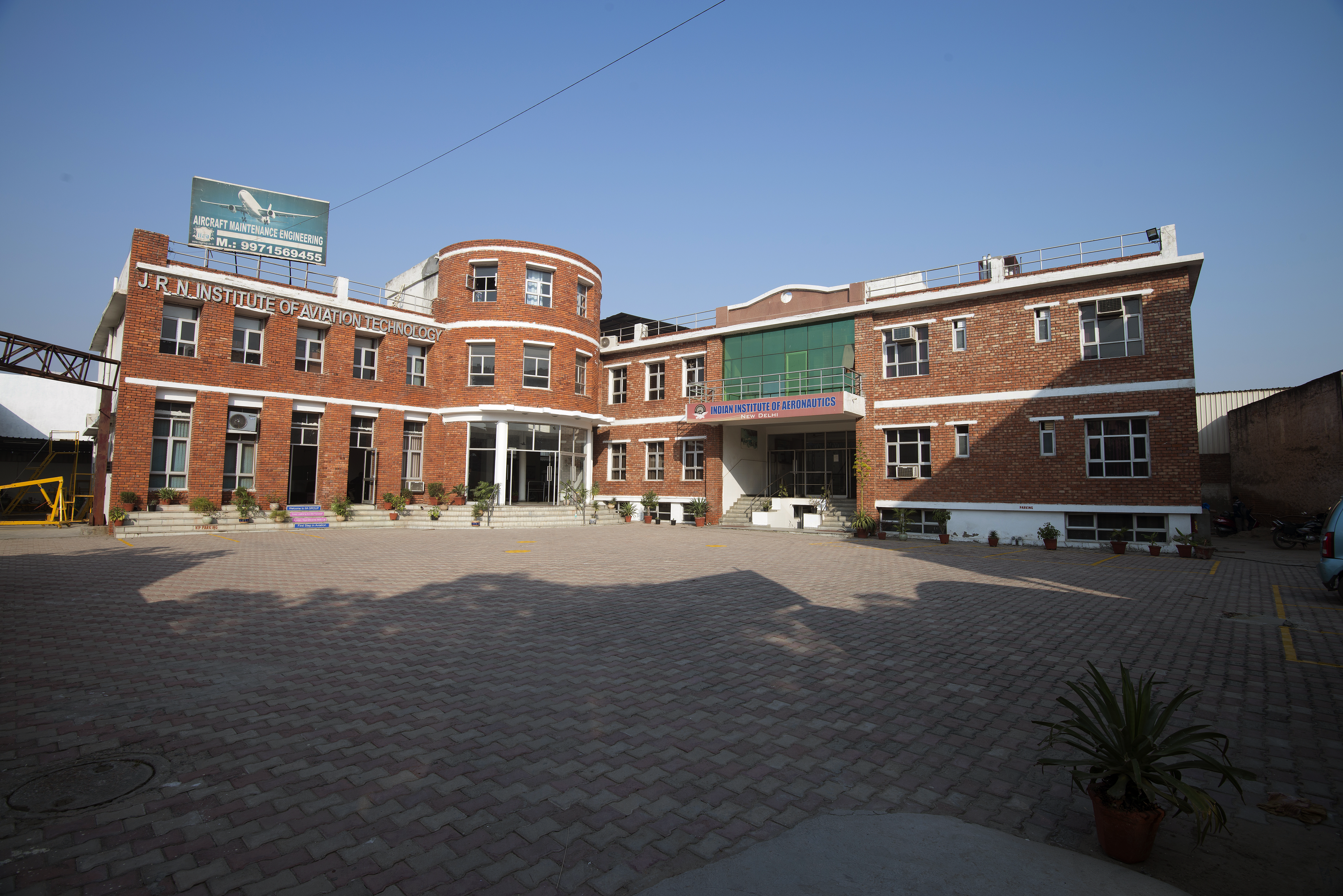

The organization forfeited its DGCA approval in year 2013 and applied went for European Union Aviation Safety Agency (EASA) Basic Aircraft Maintenance Training Approval in the year 2015. It earned permission to run EASA Part-66 aircraft maintenance training program in Category B1.1 Aeroplane Turbine.

Curriculum activities and AME Training Programme framed keeping in view the current technology in force in Aircraft Maintenance Engineering, are approved by European Union Aviation Safety Agency. Infrastructure and Training facilities of Indian Institute of Aeronautics comply with EASA requirements.

IIA together with JRN Institute of Aviation Technology in New Delhi and Bharat Institute of Aeronautics at Patna formed the IIA Group of Institutions, which are operative under the same management under certification of DGCA and EASA approved aircraft maintenance training courses. The training standards followed and practiced by IIA Group are equivalent to International Civil Aviation Organization (ICAO type-II). IIA Group also hold training with examination privileges for EASA Part-66 aircraft maintenance license.
