= G. H. Raisoni College of Engineering Nagpur =

College in Nagpur, Maharashtra, India

G H RAISONI COLLEGE OF ENGINEERING
- Former name: G.H. RAISONI COLLEGE OF ENGINEERING
- Motto: A Vision Beyond
- Established: 1996
- Accreditation: UGC, AICTE, NBA
- Academic affiliations: Nagpur University, DTE
- Chairman: Sunil Raisoni
- Chancellor: Governor of Maharashtra
- Principal: Dr. Sachin Untawale
- Director: Sachin Untawale
- Undergraduates: 5,000+
- Postgraduates: 350
- Location: CRPF Gate no. 3, Hingna Road near Lata Mangeshkar Hospital, Digdoh Hills, Nagpur, Maharashtra, 440016, India
- Campus: Urban (Autonomous)
- Colours: Magenta, Yellow, Black
- Website: ghrce.raisoni.net

Ankush Shikshan Sanstha's G H Raisoni College of Engineering (GHRCE) is an autonomous engineering college affiliated to Rashtrasant Tukadoji Maharaj Nagpur University and is located in Nagpur. The college was established in 1996 and is now run by Raisoni Group (Raisoni Education). In Year 2024 G.H. Raisoni College of Engineering, Nagpur (GHRCE) Achieved 163rd Rank from National Institutional Ranking Framework (NIRF) (Engineering Category) & 16th Rank (Innovation Category).

== History ==
GHRCE was established in 1996 and is run by Raisoni Group. Sunil Raisoni chairs the group with his son Shreyas Raisoni serving as the Director. All undergraduate courses are permanently affiliated by Rashtrasant Tukadoji Maharaj Nagpur University. In 2010, the institute was granted autonomy by the University Grants Commission. GHRCE is the youngest institute in the country to qualify for and implement the Technical Education Quality Improvement Fund (TEQIP) Project.

== Fests ==
Antaragni (Hindi: अंतराग्नि; English: The Fire Within) is the annual cultural festival of GHRCE. It is held in January or February.

Technorion is an intercollegiate technical event that hosts technical events, technical workshops, Robowar, Line-Following competition, and Lan Gaming.

== IPR and patents ==
The Indian Patent Office's annual reports ranks GHRCE in overall patent filing:

Indian Patent Office's annual reports
Year	Place
2012-13	9th
2013-14	6th
2014-15	5th
2015-16	5th
2016-17	5th
2017-18	8th

== Choice Based Credit System ==
GHRCE is an institute in the country to implement a Choice Based Credit System in engineering education.

== IEEE ==
The IEEE Student Branch (STB62361) was founded in December 1999 and is one of the largest student branches in region-10 in terms of IEEE students membership. The student's branch at GHRCE was awarded the Best IEEE students Branch Award by IEEE India Council in 2017.

The Mu Pi chapter was inaugurated on 25 April 2018 by Dr. Ramkrishna Kappagantu. It is the third ΗΚΝ Chapter in India. IEEE-Eta Kappa Nu (IEEE-ΗΚΝ) is the honour society of IEEE.

== Conferences ==
The institute hosted fifteen international conferences, including nine IEEE International Conferences, one Elsevier International conference, and over 30 National conferences. In 2008, GHRCE started a series of IEEE conferences — International Conference on Emerging Trends in Engineering & Technology (ICETET).

== Rankings ==
University and college rankings

Engineering – India
- NIRF (2024): 163

The National Institutional Ranking Framework (NIRF) ranked it 163rd among engineering colleges in 2024. The National Institutional Ranking Framework (NIRF) ranked it 16th in NIRF Ranking Innovation Category in 2024.

GHRCE ranked 69 in the engineering category in the survey "The Best Colleges of India" conducted by India Today-MDRA for 2018.

It was ranked among the Top 10 Best Industry Linked Institutes by the AICTE-CII Survey Report of 2013

It was ranked under the Platinum category for Best Industry linked institution by AICTE-CII Surveys of 2015, 2016, 2017, and 2018.

GHRCE has been re-accredited with "A" Grade in 2012 by National Assessment and Accreditation Council (NAAC) and re-accredited with "A+" grade in 2017 by NAAC.

Currently, all seven undergraduate programs are NBA accredited under Tier-I (Washington Accord).

== Notable alumni ==
- Lopa Mudra Raut
- Shiv Thakare
