= Gurleen Grewal =

Indian beauty pageant titleholder

- Education: Sanatan Dharam College
- Beauty pageant titleholder
- Title: Miss Diva International 2013
- Major competitions: Miss Diva - 2013 (Winner - Miss Diva International 2013); Miss International 2013 (Unplaced)

Gurleen Grewal is an Indian model and beauty pageant titleholder. She was crowned Miss Diva International 2013 and represented India at Miss International 2013 in Tokyo, Japan. Gurleen has done various fashion events and walked the ramp for Bridal Fashion Week and for Lakme Fashion Week.

== Miss Diva - 2013 ==
She participated in first edition of Miss Diva - 2013 and was declared 1st Runner-up. She represented India at Miss International 2013 in Tokyo where she won the second place at the Miss Internet poll.
