= Femina Miss India 2014 =

Beauty pageant edition

- Date: April 5, 2014
- Entertainment: Yo Yo Honey Singh, Mika, Shahid Kapoor, Sonakshi Sinha, Shraddha Kapoor
- Venue: Yash Raj Studios, Mumbai, India
- Broadcaster: Colors (TV channel)
- Entrants: 24
- Winner: Koyal Rana; New Delhi
- Congeniality: Arpita Kaur; Dubai, UAE
- Best National Costume: Jhataleka Malhotra
- Photogenic: Jantee Hazarika
- Miss Internet: Irshika Mehrotra
- Beauty with a purpose: Koyal Rana

The 51st edition of the Femina Miss India beauty pageant was held on April 5, 2014 in Mumbai, India. Finalists had been selected in a previous round held in Bangalore in January 2014, with 24 women competing for the title of Miss India World. Koyal Rana from Delhi was crowned Femina Miss India 2014 by the previous year's winner Navneet Kaur Dhillon, while Jhataleka Malhotra and Gail Nicole Da Silva were crowned 1st and 2nd Runners Up respectively.

Koyal Rana represented India at Miss World 2014 held in the United Kingdom where she was declared Miss World Asia and placed in the top 11. Jhataleka Malhotra represented India at Miss International held in Japan where she won the Miss Internet Beauty award. Gail Nicole Da Silva represented India at Miss United Continent 2014 held in Ecuador where she was crowned 1st Runner Up and also won the Miss Photogenic and Best National Costume awards.

After the Femina Miss India 2014 pageant, Ruhi Singh, who was not a contestant at Femina Miss India 2014 but had been a contestant in the 2012 edition, was later designated by Femina as India's representative at Miss Universal Peace and Humanity 2014 held in Lebanon where she was crowned the first ever winner of the pageant.

== Final results ==
Color keys

- The contestant Won in an International pageant.
- The contestant was a Runner-up in an International pageant.
- The contestant was a Semi-Finalist in an International pageant.
- Unplaced

Final Results	Candidate	International Placement
Miss India 2014	Koyal Rana	Miss World - Asia; Top 11
Miss India International 2014	Jhataleka Malhotra	Unplaced
Miss India United Continents 2014	Gail Nicole Da Silva	2nd Runner-up
Top 5	Lopamudra Raut; Nikhila Nandgopal	
Top 10	Amarjot Kaur; Ashwati Ramesh; Irshikaa Mehrotra; Jantee Hazarika; Simran Khandelwal	

== Special awards ==
Award	Contestant
Best National Costume	Jhataleka Malhotra
fbb Miss India Wild Card Entry	Aditi Vats
Palladium Hotel Miss Congeniality	Arpita Kaur
Times Miss Sudoku	Malti Chahar
Monarch Universal Femina Miss Lifestyle	Sahithya Jagannathan
fbb Femina Miss Vivacious	T J Bhanu
Femina Miss Rampwalk	Varsha Gopal
Yamaha Ray Femina Miss Adventurous	Yoshiki Sindhar
INIFD Femina Miss Talented	Winner - Deepti Sati; Runner Up - Yoshiki Sindhar
Femina Miss Iron Maiden	Deepti Sati
Richfeel Femina Miss Beautiful Hair	Nikhila Nanadgopal
Cinnamon Femina Miss Active	Nikhila Nanadgopal
Femina Miss Beautiful Smile	Irshikaa Mehrotra
Femina Miss Multimedia	Irshikaa Mehrotra
fbb Femina Miss Fashion Icon	Jantee Hazarika
Femina Miss Photogenic	Jantee Hazarika
Neutrogena Femina Miss Healthy Skin	Koyal Rana
Beauty with a purpose	Koyal Rana
Miss Perfect Body	Lopamudra Raut
PCJ Miss Timeless Beauty	Gail Nicole Da Silva

== Finale judges ==
- Abhay Deol - Bollywood Actor
- Aditi Rao Hydari - Model and Bollywood Actress
- Jacqueline Fernandez - Miss Universe Sri Lanka 2006, model and Bollywood actress
- Malaika Arora - Actress, model, VJ and television presenter
- Manish Malhotra - Fashion designer
- Megan Young - Miss World 2013 from Philippines
- Vidyut Jamwal - Model and actor
- Vijender Singh - Indian Olympic Boxer
- Yo Yo Honey Singh - Singer and Rapper

== Contestants ==
24 contestants were selected from all over the country to compete in the main event.

Contestant	Age	Height	Hometown	International Performance
Arpita Kaur	20	1.74 m (5 ft 8 1/2 in)	Dubai	
Aditi Vats	21	1.77 m (5 ft 9 1/2 in)	Pune	
Amarjot Kaur	24	1.71 m (5 ft 7 1/2 in)	Chandigarh	
Aradhana Nayar	21	1.70 m (5 ft 7 in)	Noida	
Ashwati Ramesh	20	1.74 m (5 ft 8 1/2 in)	Bangalore	
Charmaine Sequeira	19	1.71 m (5 ft 7 1/2 in)	Mumbai	
Deepti Sati	24	1.70 m (5 ft 7 in)	Mumbai	
Gail Nicole Da Silva	21	1.73 m (5 ft 8 in)	Margao	Miss United Continent 2014 Primera Princessa
Irshikaa Mehrotra	20	1.73 m (5 ft 8 in)	Hyderabad	
Jantee Hazarika	20	1.73 m (5 ft 8 in)	Guwahati	
Jhataleka Malhotra	19	1.73 m (5 ft 8 in)	Mumbai	Miss International Internet 2014
Koyal Rana	21	1.76 m (5 ft 9 1/2 in)	New Delhi	Miss World 2014 Top 10, Miss World Asia 2014
Lopamudra Raut	19	1.74 m (5 ft 8 1/2 in)	Nagpur	Miss United Continents 2016-2nd Runner up
Malti Chahar	23	1.71 m (5 ft 7 1/2 in)	Agra	
Mansi Grewal	18	1.78 m (5 ft 10 in)	Chandigarh	
Medhini Igoor	22	1.73 m (5 ft 8 in)	Bangalore	
Nikhila Nandagopal	18		Bangalore	
Sahithya Jagannathan	24		Chennai	
Sanjana Ganesan	22		Pune	
Simran Khandelwal	18		Indore	
Shailja Sharma	20	1.73 m (5 ft 8 in)	Solan	
Sonal Rihani	21		Kolkata	
T J Bhanu	21		Raipur	
Varsha Gopal	19		Bangalore	
Yoshiki Sindhar	23		New Delhi	
