= Miss United Continents =

- Formation: 2006; 20 years ago
- Purpose: Beauty pageant
- Headquarters: Guayaquil
- Location: Ecuador
- Official language: English; Spanish
- President: Maria del Carmen de Aguayo
- Budget: $1 m CAD
- Website: www.misscontinenteunidos.com
- Formerly called: Miss Continente Americano; Miss Continentes Unidos

Miss United Continents (formerly known as Miss Continente Americano and often known as Miss Continentes Unidos) is a beauty pageant that has been held regularly since 2006.

The current Miss United Continents is Joanna Camelle Mercado of Philippines who won on August 7, 2022 in Portoviejo, Ecuador.

== History ==
The contest was first held in 2006 and was known as Miss Continente Americano. The event was restricted to Latin American countries originally and later changed its name to Miss United Continents in 2013, in addition to allowing competitions from outside of the Americas compete. The competition is almost always held in Guayaquil, Ecuador with endorsement of the Municipality of Guayaquil. The event is usually broadcast for free on GamaTV, as they host the event.

The competition has several goals including to form a union between various countries through their pageant ambassadors and to promote tourism in the city of Guayaquil. The prize for winning the competition is a gold-plated silver and precious stone crown designed by Christian Quinteros. Winners also receive $6,000 in cash and other prizes from sponsors.

Competitors are judged on beauty, elegance and intelligence. Competitors who are finalists or winners of national versions of beauty pageants including Miss Universe, Miss World, Miss International and Miss Earth are eligible to compete.

== Qualifications ==
Contestants must meet various requirements including being under 27 years old, not having any children and not having visible tattoos or piercings.

== Titleholders ==
Year	Country/Territory	Titleholder	Location	Age
2022	Philippines	Joanna Camelle Mercado	Portoviejo, Ecuador	27
2019	Colombia	Anairis Cadavid Ardila	Portoviejo, Ecuador	31
2018	Mexico	Yamil Andrea Sáenz Castillo	Portoviejo, Ecuador	32
2017	Russia	Tatyana Ivanovna Tsimfer	Portoviejo, Ecuador	33
2016	Philippines	Jeslyn David Santos	Portoviejo, Ecuador	28
2015	Brazil	Nathália Paiva Lago	Portoviejo, Ecuador	28
2014	Dominican Republic	Geisha Nathalie Montes de Oca Robles	Portoviejo, Ecuador	31
2013	Ecuador	Carolina Andrea Aguirre Pérez	Portoviejo, Ecuador	27
2012	Brazil	Camila de Lima Serakides	Portoviejo, Ecuador	21
2011	Ecuador	Claudia Schiess	Portoviejo, Ecuador	21
2010	Peru	Giuliana Myriam Zevallos Roncagliolo	Portoviejo, Ecuador	20
2009	Colombia	Lina Marcela Mosquera Ochoa	Portoviejo, Ecuador	20
2008	Mexico	María Guadalupe González Gallegos	Portoviejo, Ecuador	20
2007	Dominican Republic	Marianne Elizabeth Cruz González	Portoviejo, Ecuador	22
2006	Dominican Republic	Mía Lourdes Taveras López	Portoviejo, Ecuador	21

== Ranking ==
Country	Titles	Year
Dominican Republic	3	2006, 2007, 2014
Philippines	2	2016, 2022
Colombia	2	2009, 2019
Mexico	2	2008, 2018
Brazil	2	2012, 2015
Ecuador	2	2011, 2013
Russia	1	2017
Peru	1	2010
