= Rajeshwari Kumari =

Indian sports shooter and fashion designer

Personal information
- Nationality: Indian
- Born: 10 December 1991 (age 34) Delhi, India
- Education: Manav Rachna International Institute of Research and Studies
- Occupations: Sports shooter; fashion designer
- Spouses: Mehtab Singh (m. 2013 div); Kynan Chenai (m. 2026)
- Parents: Randhir Singh (father); Vinita Singh (mother)
Medal record
Women's shooting
Representing India
Asian Games
Silver medal – second place	2022 Hangzhou	Women's trap team
Asian Championships
Gold medal – first place	2016 Abu Dhabi	Trap team

Ria Rajeshwari Kumari (born 10 December 1991) is an Indian sports shooter and fashion designer. Kumari is a trap shooter and has won medals in both domestic and international competitions. She won the silver medal at the Women's trap team event in the 2022 Asian Games in Hangzhou. In 2024, she competed in the Women's trap event in the 2024 Summer Olympics in Paris. As of 2024, she is the 9th ranked women's trap shooter in the world. Kumari is a co-founder of Saurab Rajeshwari, a luxury Indian clothing and embroidery brand founded in 2021.

== Early life and background ==
Ria Rajeshwari Kumari was born on 10 December 1991 in Delhi, India. Kumari is the daughter of sports administrator and former Olympic-level trap shooter Randhir Singh and Vinita Singh.

She is the paternal granddaughter of Bhalindra Singh and the great-granddaughter of Maharaja Bhupinder Singh of Patiala.

She attended university at Manav Rachna International Institute of Research and Studies.

== Shooting career ==
Kumari started her trap shooting career sometime before 2014. In November 2014, she won a bronze medal at the National Shotgun Championship in Patiala, Punjab, beating Shreyasi Singh for the medal. In February 2015, she won a silver medal at the National Shooting Championships, held in New Delhi, India. During the 63rd National Shotgun Shooting Championship in 2019, Kumari shot a national record 118 out of 125 in the qualifications, and eventually won a silver medal. In 2021, she won a gold medal at the Asian Online Shooting Championship in New Delhi. Also in 2021, she won a silver medal in the team trap event at the 2021 ISSF World Cup in Cairo, Egypt, along with Kirti Gupta and Manisha Keer.

In 2022, Kumari began being coached by David Kostelecký, a Czech shooter who won two Olympic medals. At the National Shooting Championships in 2022, Kumari shot the highest score in the qualification round, shooting 116 out of 125, however she lost in the semifinals of the competition. In March 2023, Kumari shot a score of 107 and came 46th in the Doha, Qatar, stage of the 2023 ISSF World Cup. In April 2023, she won the T3 Shotgun National Selection Trials in Delhi. In May 2023, Kumari came 14th in the Cairo stage of the 2023 ISSF World Cup.

In June 2023, Kumari shot a score of 111 in the finals of the 4th National Shotgun Selection Trials in Bhopal, Madhya Pradesh, and qualified for the 2022 Asian Games in Hangzhou, which were delayed to 2023 due to the COVID-19 pandemic in China. In August 2023, Kumari finished fifth in the ISSF World Championship in Baku, Azerbaijan, and won a quota place for India in the Women's trap event in the Paris 2024 Summer Olympics. With her quota win, which was the seventh 2024 Summer Olympics quota win in shooting for India, Kumari became the second Indian woman to ever win an Olympic quota place in the Women's trap event. In early October 2023, Kumari won the silver medal in the Women's trap team event in the 2022 Asian Games. In late October 2023, she finished in 7th place at the 2023 Asian Shooting Championships in Seoul, South Korea. In November 2023, Kumari won a gold medal in the 2023 National Games of India.

In March 2024, Kumari qualified for the Women's trap event in the 2024 Summer Olympics in Paris. In April 2024, she was selected for the Ministry of Youth Affairs and Sports' (MYAS) Target Olympic Podium Scheme (TOPS), which assists athletes in their preparations for Olympic Games competitions. In 2024, Kumari was ranked 9th in the world. In the run-up to the 2024 Summer Olympics, Kumari began to train in Italy with her coach, Kostelecký. In June 2024, Kumari was officially selected to be part of India's shotgun team for the 2024 Summer Olympics. The Ministry of Youth Affairs and Sports also covered the expenses for Kumari's 2024 Summer Olympics training in the Czech Republic with her coach Kostelecký, as well as in Italy and France. For two years, up until the middle of 2024, Kumari also worked with an eye and vision coach to improve her shooting abilities.

In July 2024, during the Women's trap event at the 2024 Summer Olympics in Paris, Kumari finished in 22nd place with a score of 113 out of 125, and failed to qualify for the final round.

== Fashion career ==
In 2021, Kumari co-founded Saurab Rajeshwari, a luxury Indian clothing and embroidery brand based on traditional Patiala-style Punjabi fashion, with her childhood friend Saurabh Aggarwal. Saurab Rajeshwari's clothes are handmade. The brand's clothing has been worn by Bollywood actress, Preity Zinta. In December 2022, Kumari was featured on Jasbir Jassi's song, 'Lehenga', and the song was also a collaboration between Jassi and Saurab Rajeshwari.

== Personal life ==
Kumari was married to Mehtab Singh. She and Singh married in 2013. In 2026, she married Kynan Chenai who is also a trap shooter.
