= Kirti Gupta =

Indian sport shooter

Kirti Gupta (born 6 February 2001) is an Indian sport shooter. She won a silver medal at the ISSF World Cup shotgun in Cairo in the team trap shooting along with Manisha Keer and Rajeshwari Kumari.
