= Embroidery of India =

Any of the various styles of embroidery indigenous to India

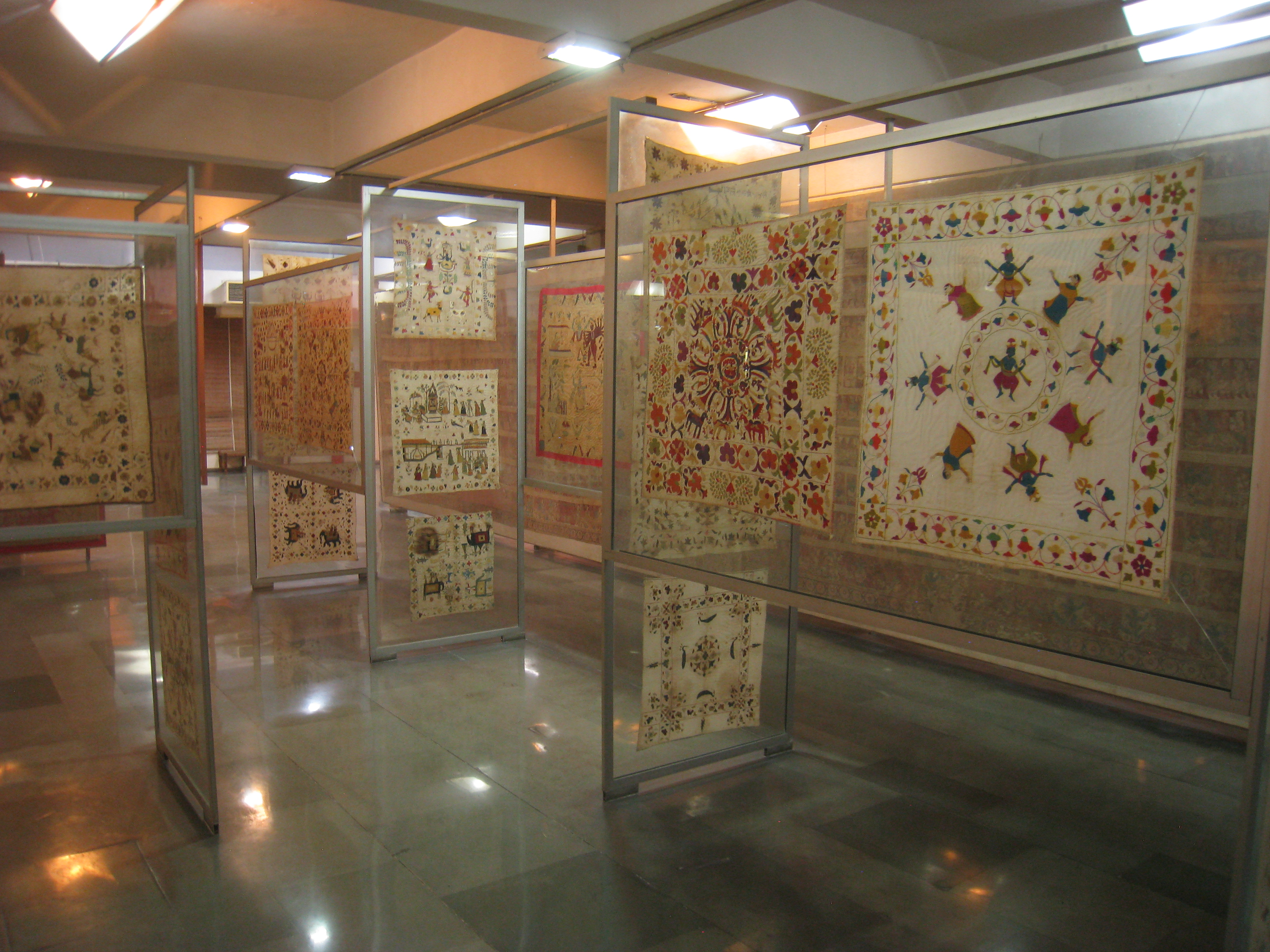
Exhibit in Craft Museum New Delhi

Embroidery in India includes dozens of embroidery styles that vary by region and clothing styles. Designs in Indian embroidery are formed on the basis of the texture and the design of the fabric and the stitch. The dot and the alternate dot, the circle, the square, the triangle, and permutations and combinations of these constitute the design.

== Photo gallery ==
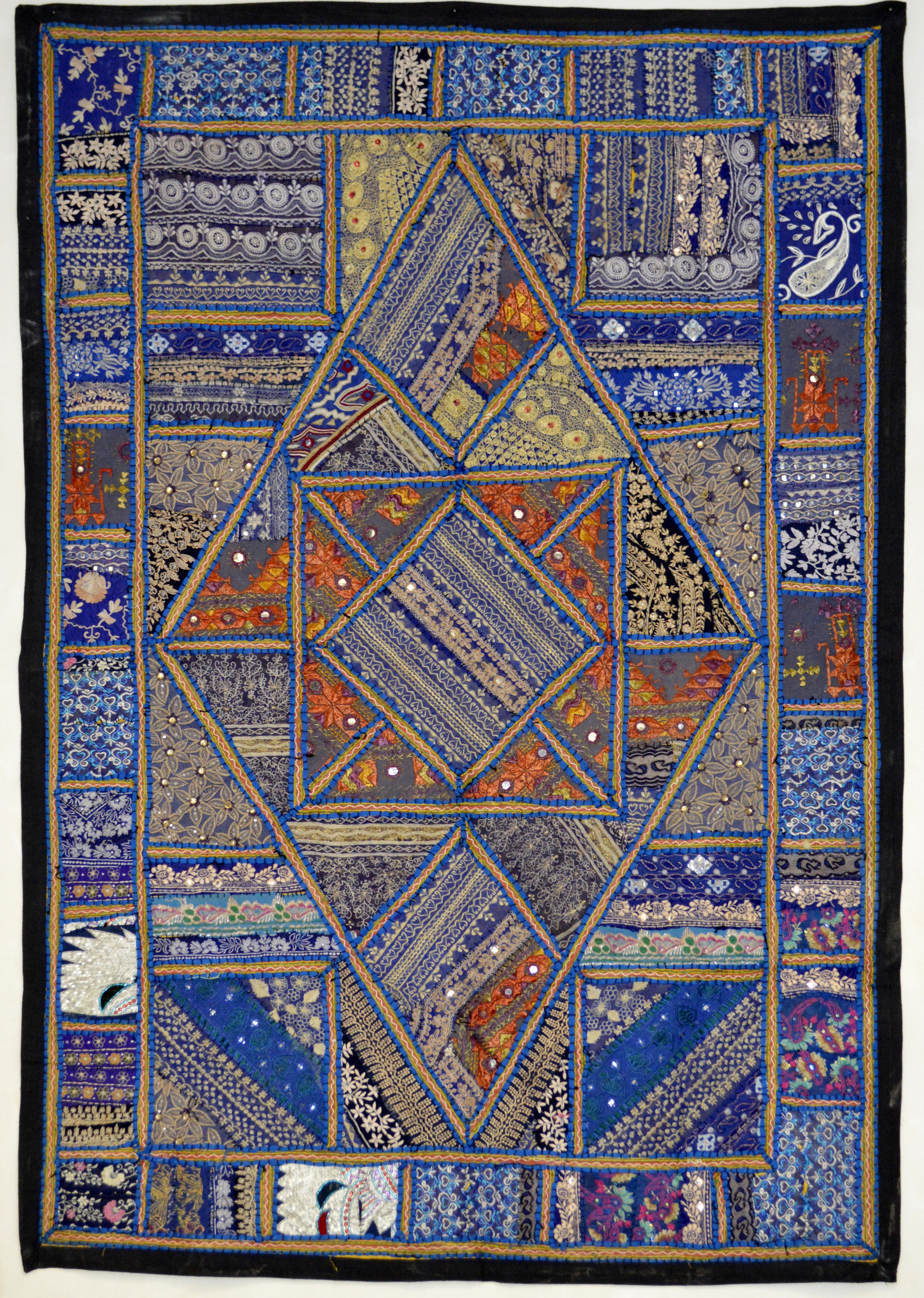
Blue mural embroidery, Udaipur, Rajasthan, India

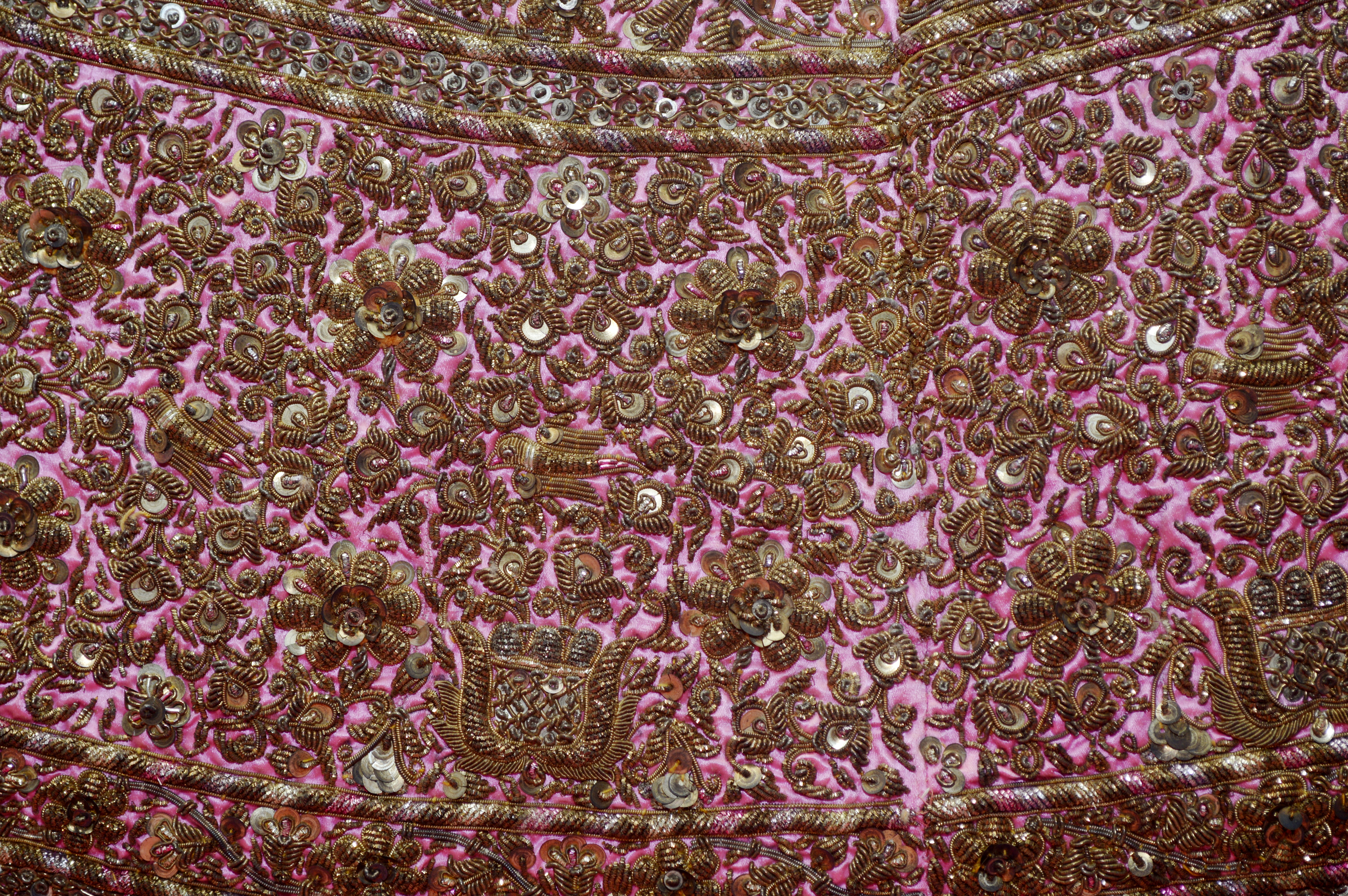
Pink dress with embroidery, detail, Crafts Museum, New Delhi

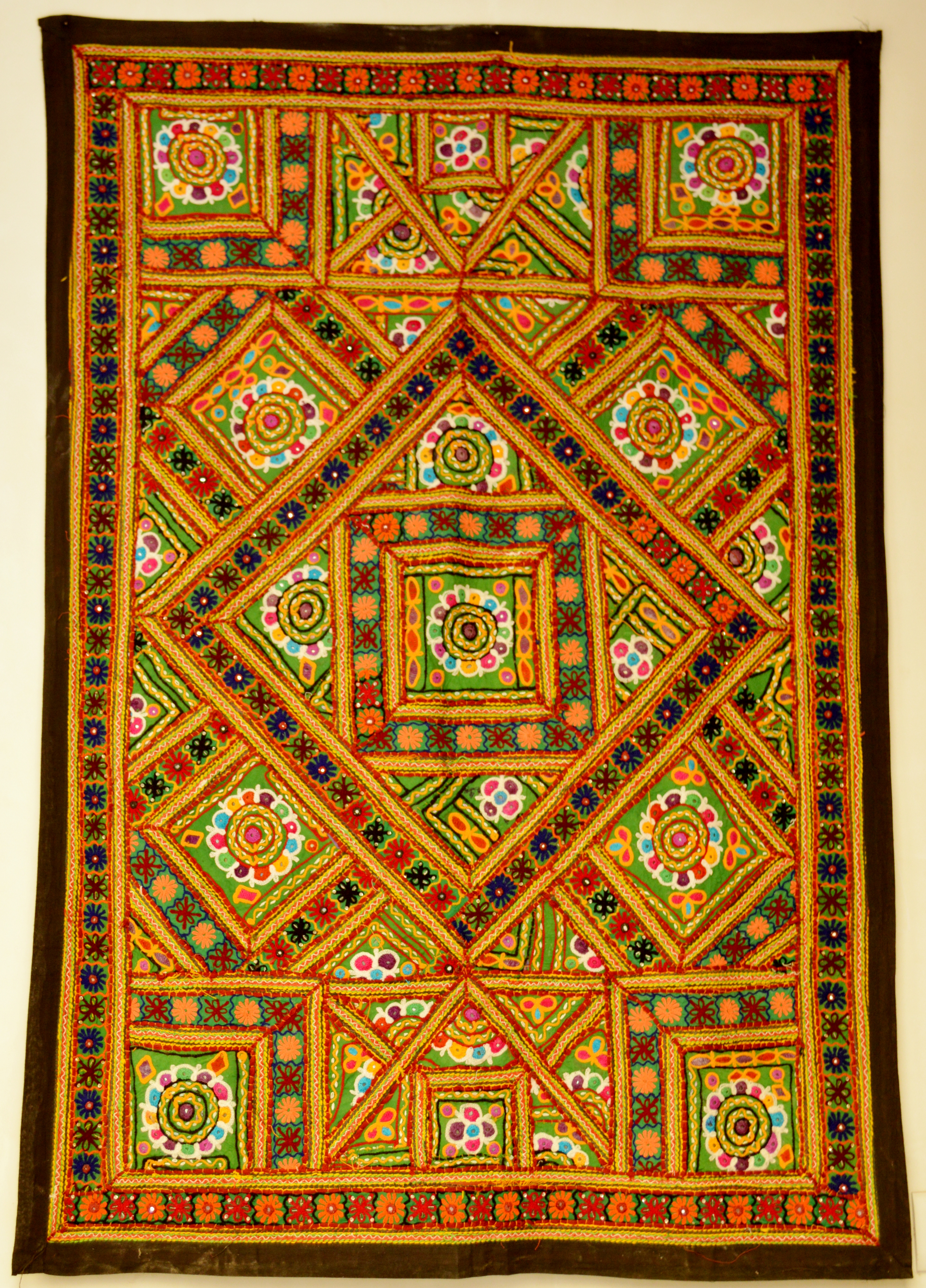
Mural embroidery, Udaipur, Rajasthan, India

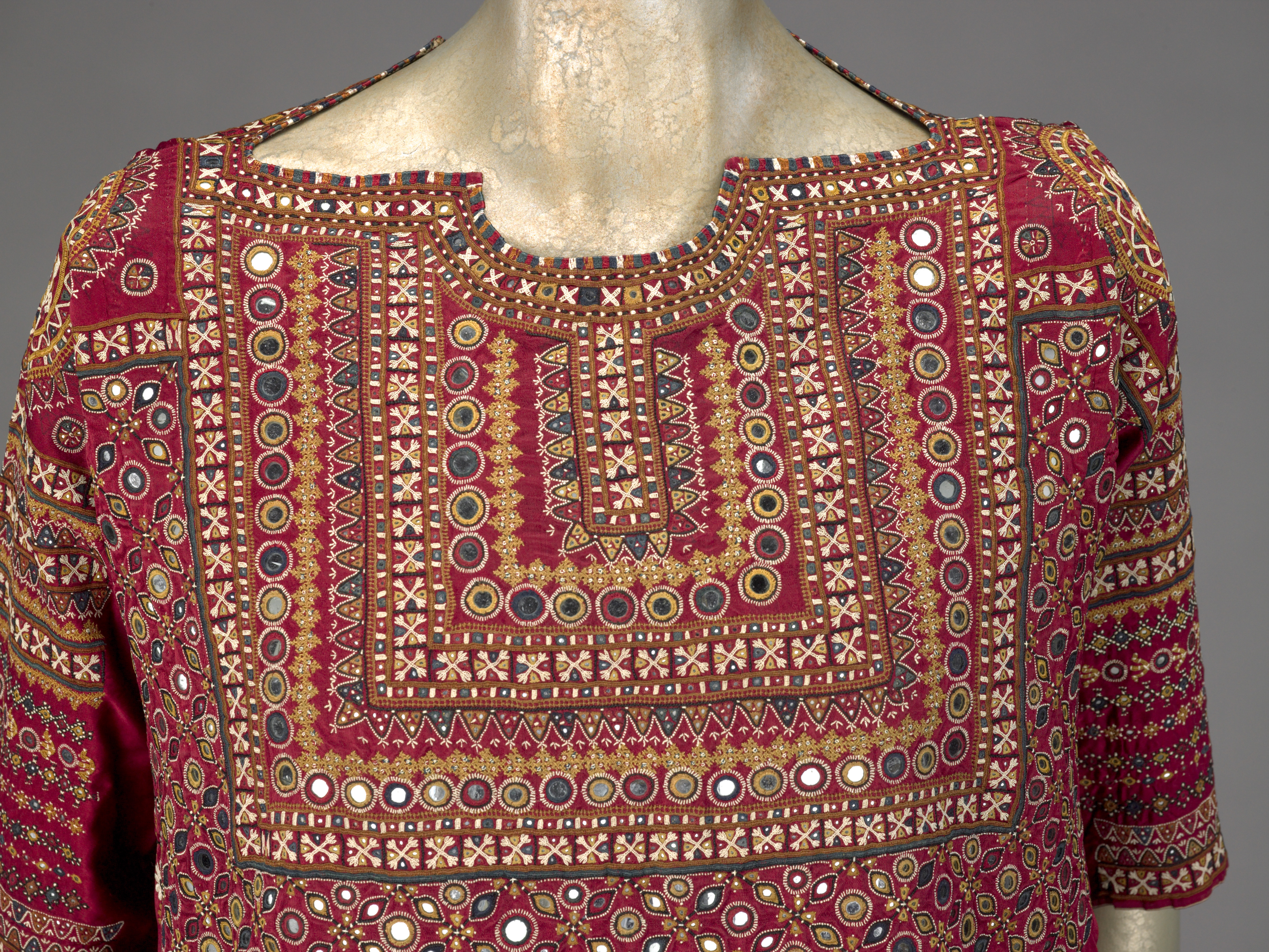
Woman's shirt from Kutch, Gujarat, India

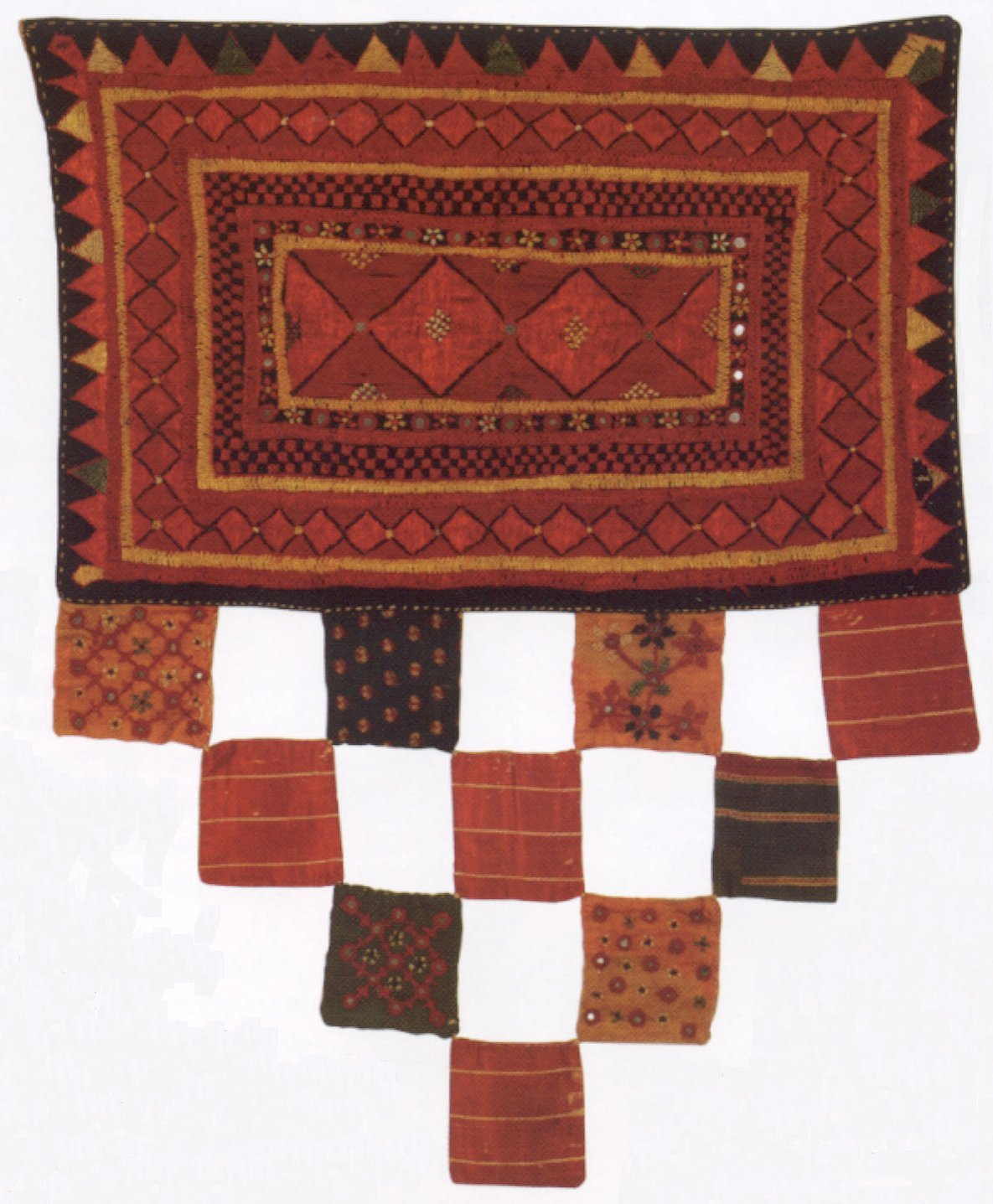
Embroidered hanging, Kutch (western India)

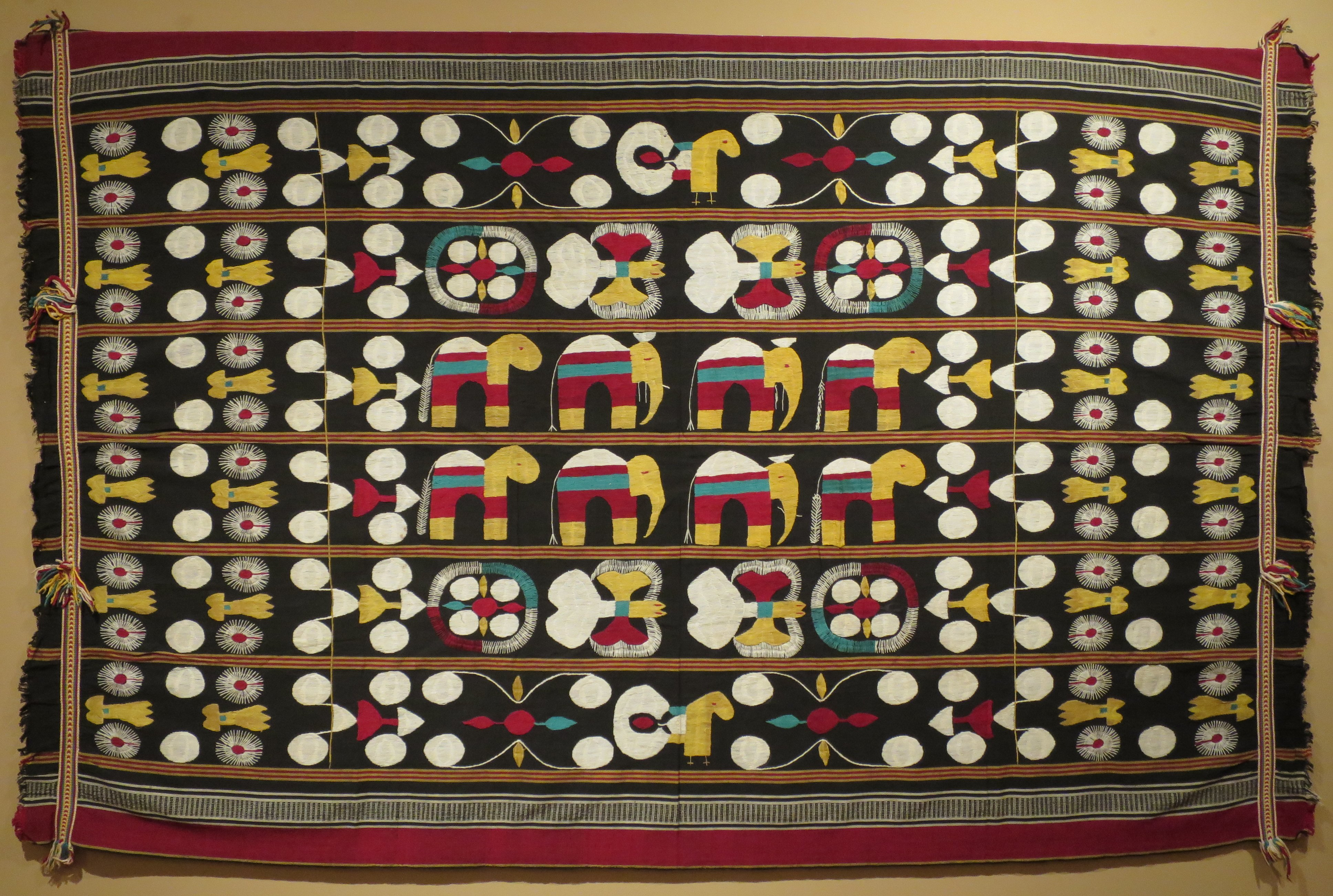
Embroidered textile from Nagaland, Honolulu Museum of Art

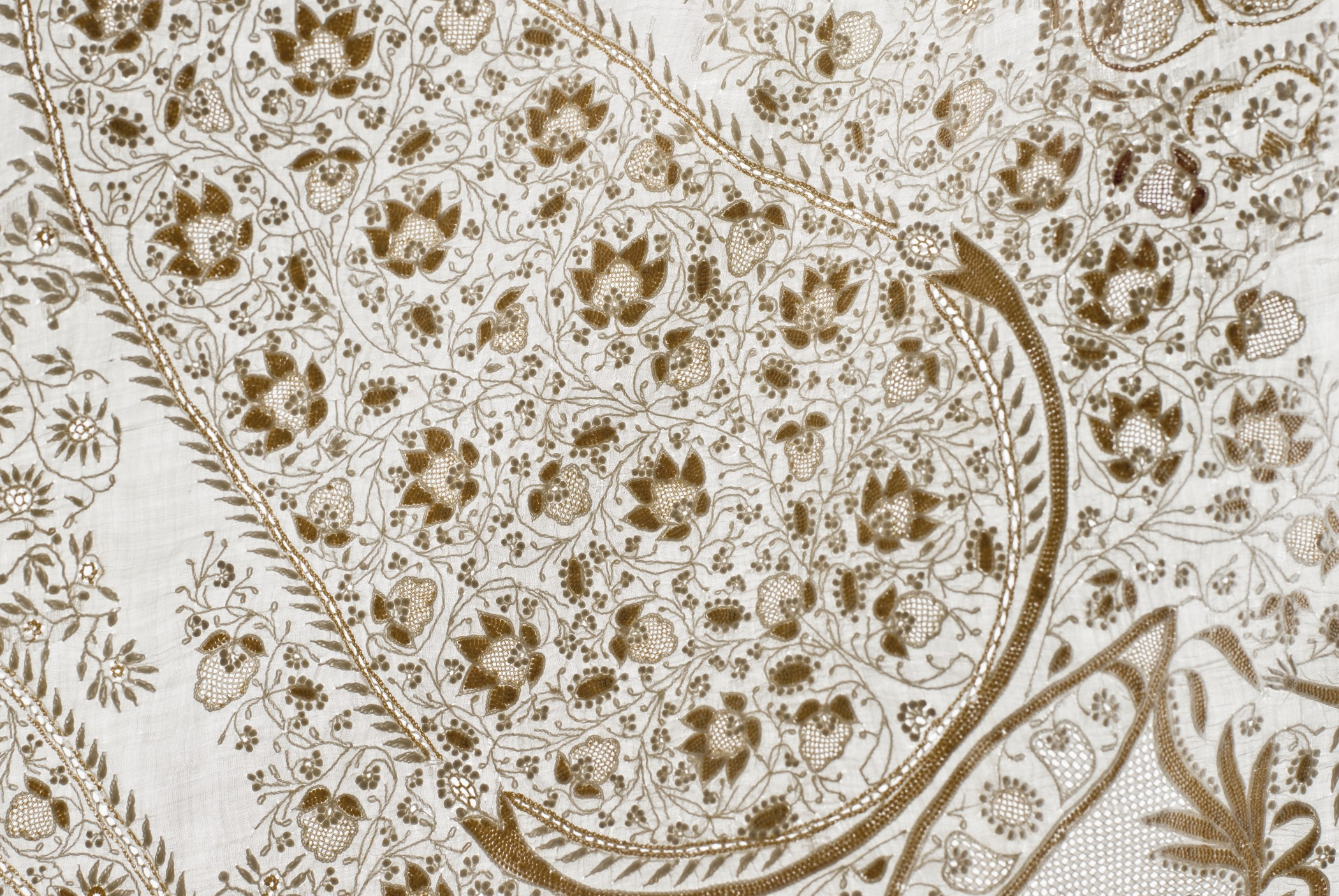
Woman's Wrapped Garment (Sari) Uttar Pradesh

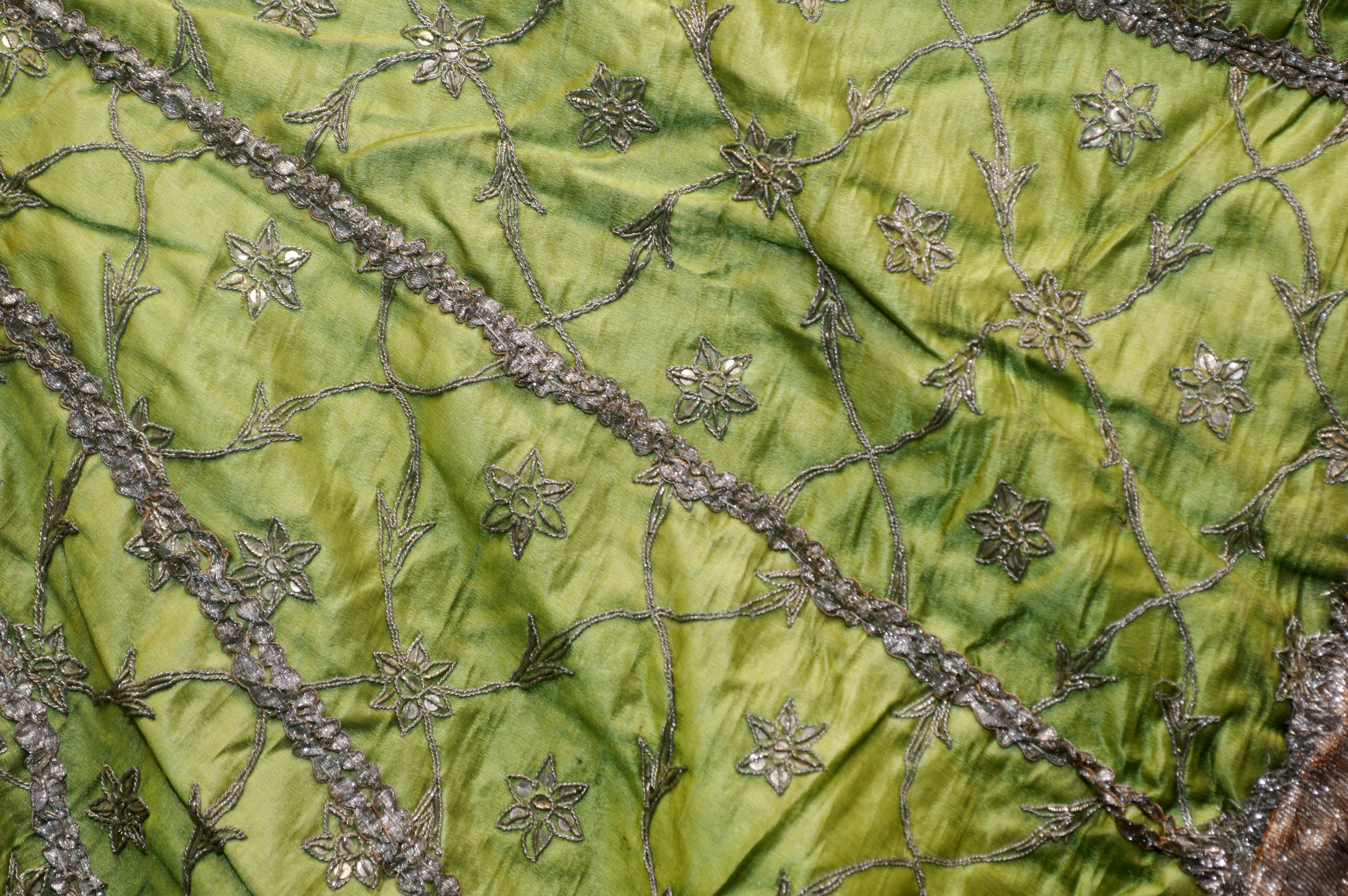
Green cloth with embroidery, detail, Crafts Museum, Delhi

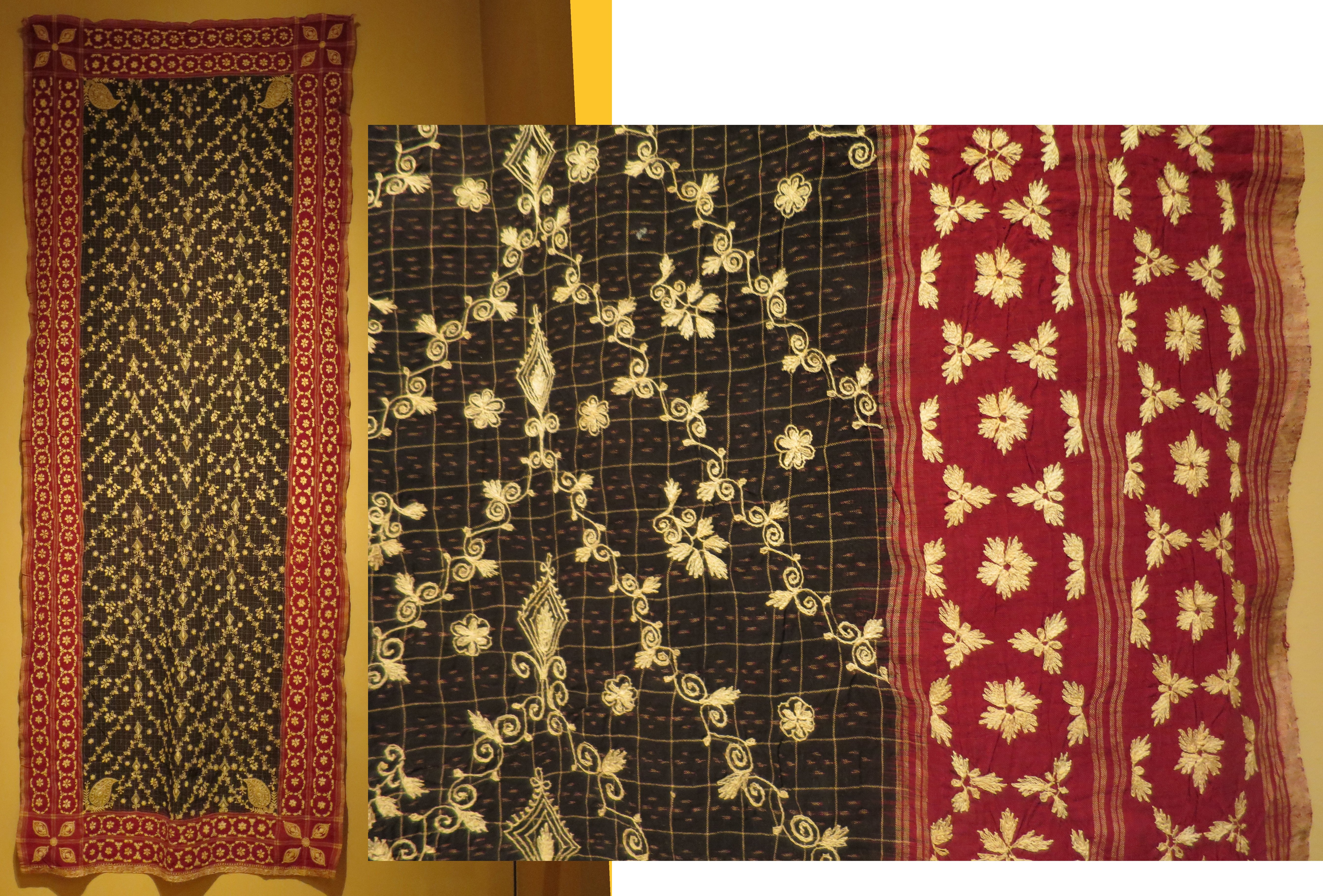
Hanging from India, Honolulu Museum of Art

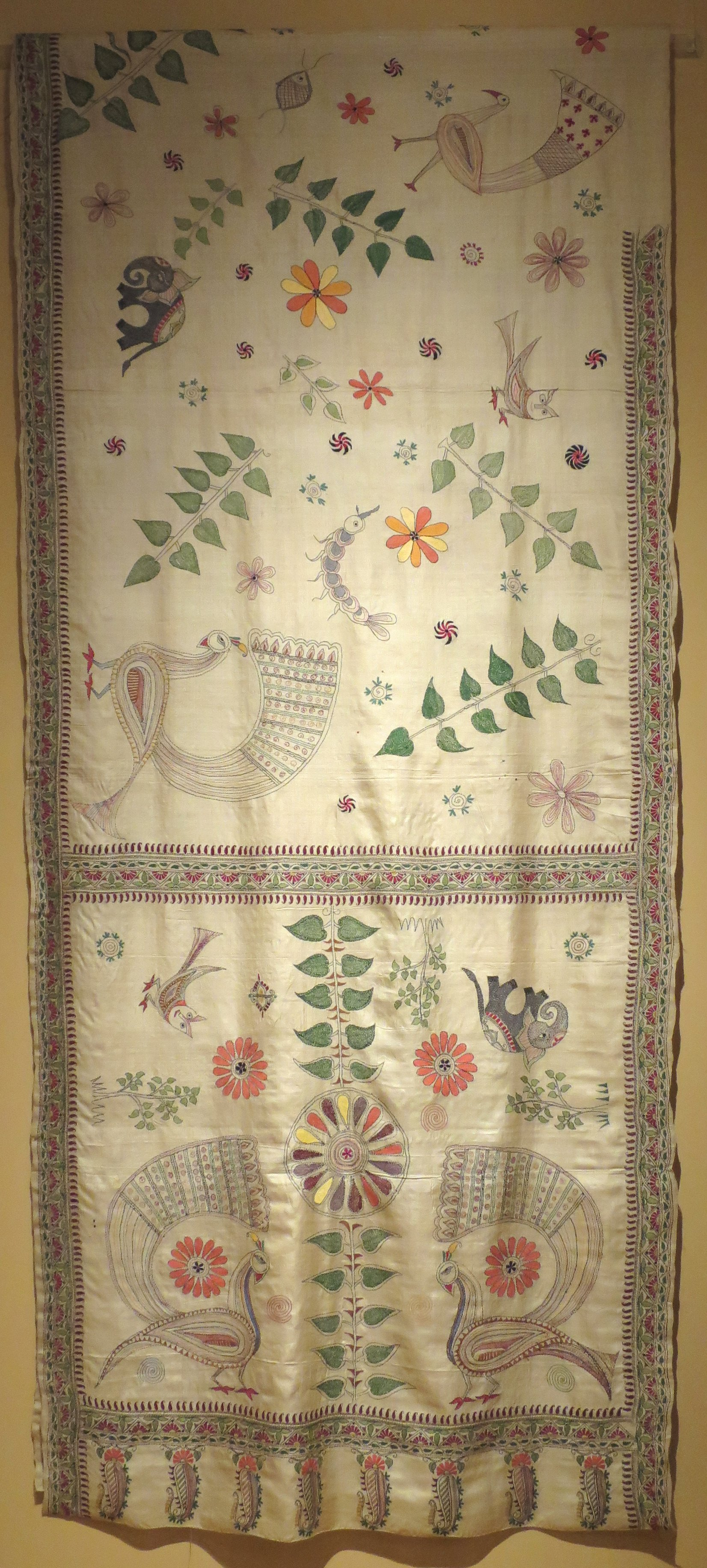
Sari from Bengal India, 20th century, Honolulu Museum of Art

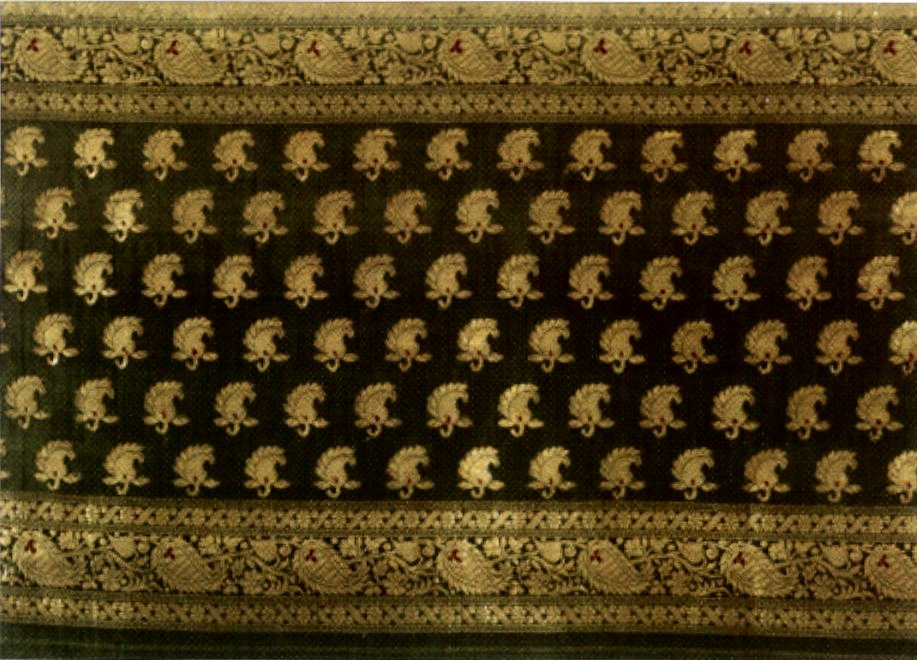
'Banarasi sari' from Varanasi (Banaras), silk and gold-wrapped silk yarn with supplementary weft brocade (zari)

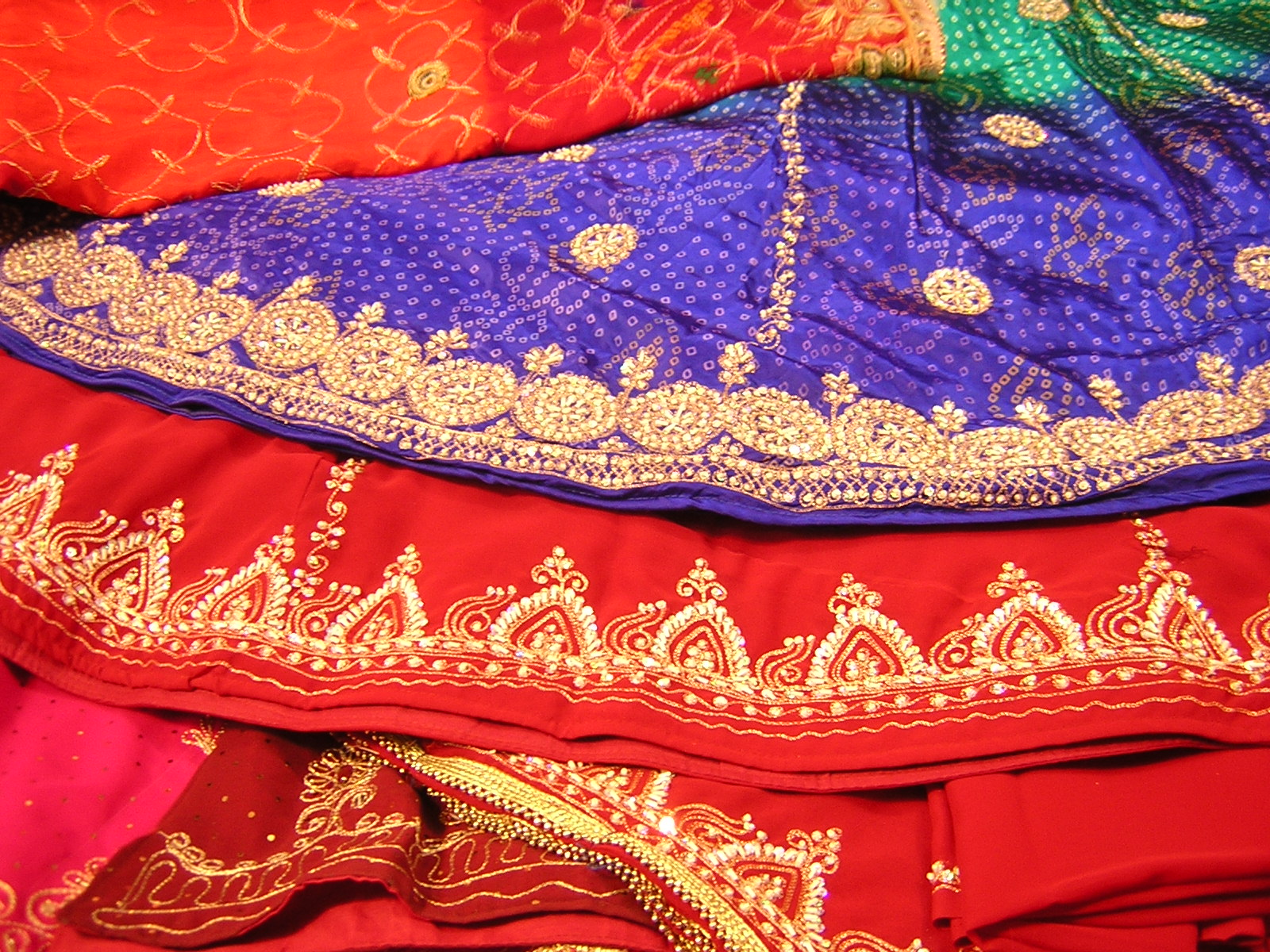
Rajasthani clothes

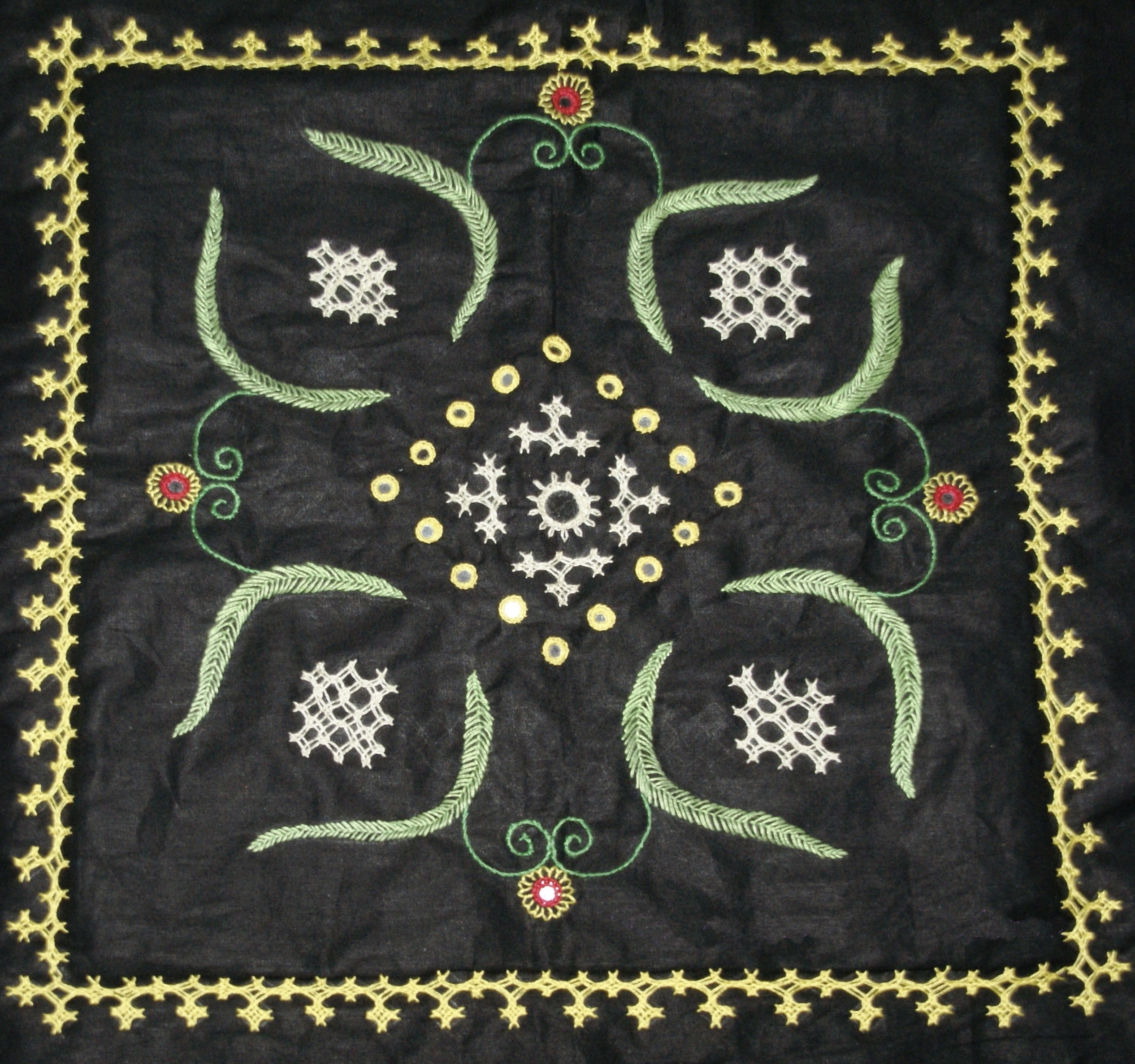
Kutch cushion embroidery

== Aari ==
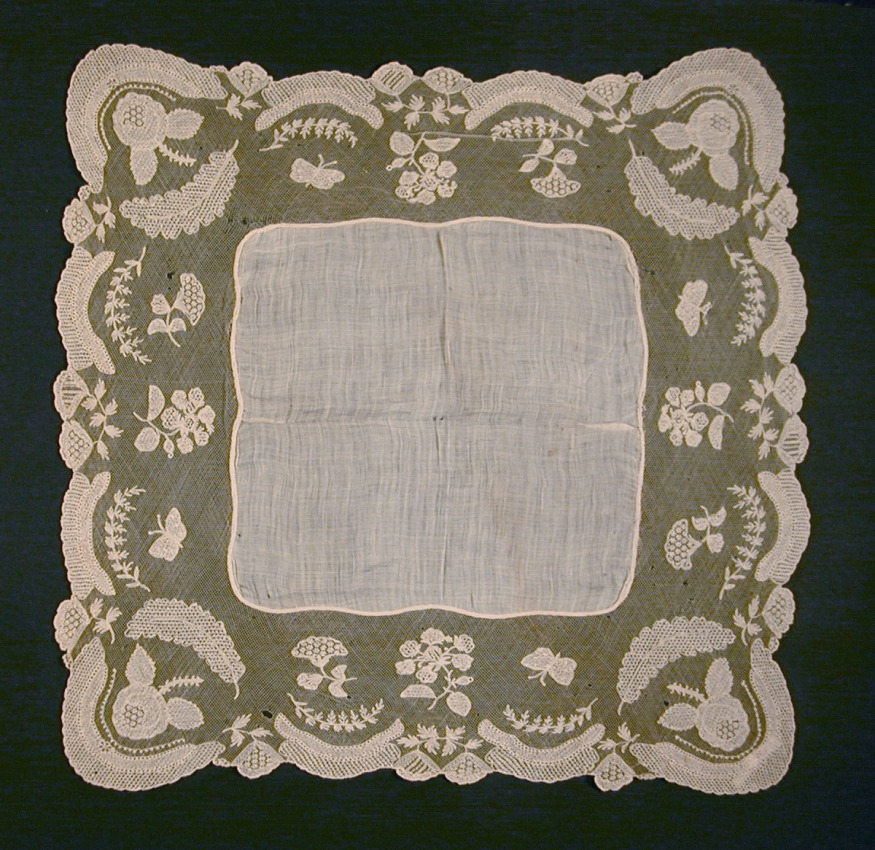
Cotton tambour embroidery on net. 19th century. Los Angeles County Museum of Art.

Aari work involves a hook, plied from the top but fed by silk thread from below with the material spread out on a frame. This movement creates loops, and repeats of these lead to a line of chain stitches. The fabric is stretched on a frame and stitching is done with a long needle ending with a hook such as a crewel, tambour (a needle similar to a very fine crochet hook but with a sharp point) or Luneville work. The other hand feeds the thread from the underside, and the hook brings it up, making a chainstitch, but it is much quicker than chainstitch done in the usual way: looks like machine-made and can also be embellished with sequins and beads - which are kept on the right side, and the needle goes inside their holes before plunging below, thus securing them to the fabric. There are many types of materials used, such as zari threads, embellishments, sequins etc.

Aari embroidery is practiced in various regions such as in Kashmir and Kutch (Gujarat).

== Banjara embroidery ==
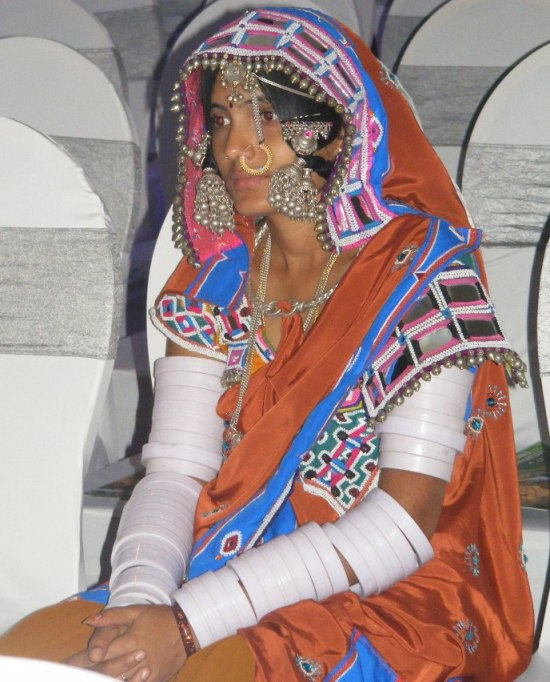
Banjara Lambani woman in traditional dress

Practiced by the Lambada tribes of Andhra Pradesh, Banjara embroidery is a mix of applique with mirrors and beadwork. Bright red, yellow, black and white coloured cloth is laid in bands and joined with a white criss-cross stitch. The Banjaras of Madhya Pradesh who are found in the districts of Malwa and Nimar have their own style of embroidery where designs are created according to the weave of the cloth, and the textured effect is achieved by varying colours and stitches of the geometric patterns and designs. Motifs are generally highlighted by cross-stitch.

== Heer Bharat or Banni (Gujarat) ==
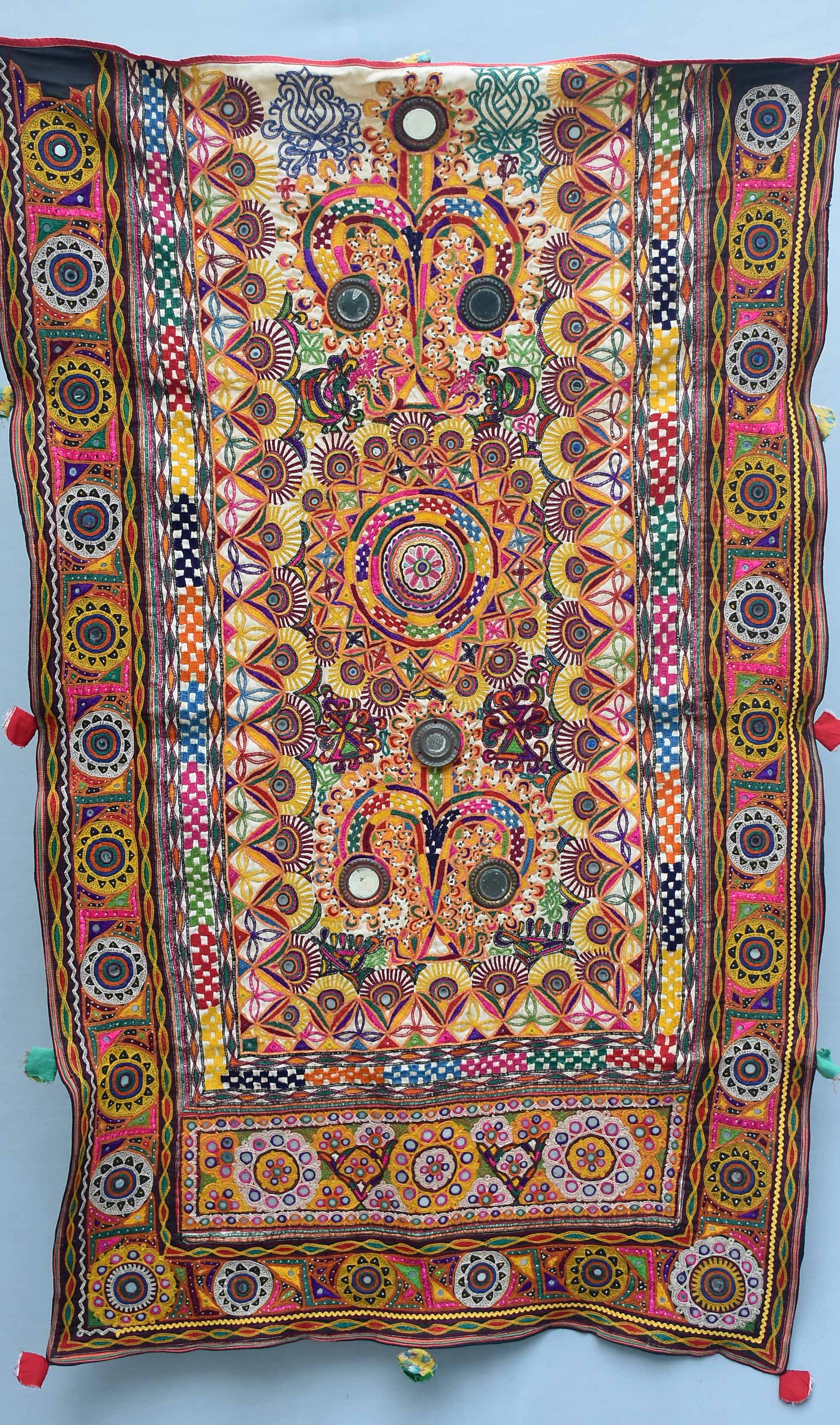
Ahir embroidery from Kutch, Gujarat

The Heer Bharat or Banni embroidery originates in Gujarat, and is practiced mainly by the Lohana community. It is done with silk floss (Heer means "silk floss") and it is famous for its vibrancy and richness in color pallets & design patterns, which include shisha (mirror) work. Bagh and phulkari embroidery of the Punjab region has influenced Heer Bharat embroidery in its use of geometrical motifs and stitchery.

== Chamba Rumal (Himachal Pradesh) ==
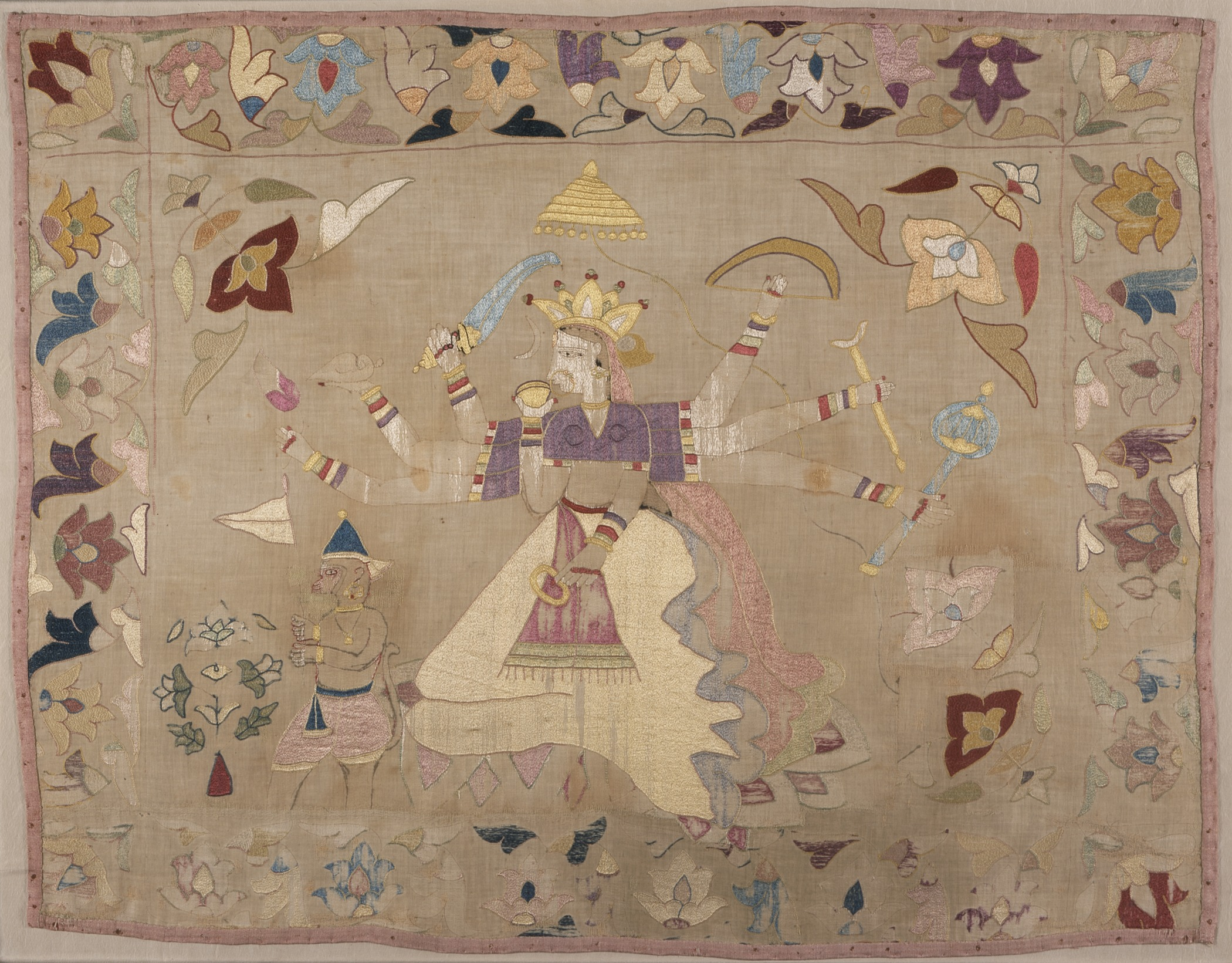
Chamba Rumal with Scenes of Sita and Hanuman

It originated in Chamba kingdom of Himachal Pradesh in 17th century. This embroidery flourished in the princely hill states of Kangra, Chamba, Basholi, and other neighbouring provinces. The Chamba region has highly skilled craftsmen. Chamba embroidery has its own distinctive style, small squares or rectangles of clothe embroidered with untwisted silk threads. While untwisted silk is most common some Chamba embroidery make use of thin metal wires or metallic yarn. While the chamba rumal originated in the 17th century it reached widespread popularity in the 18th century after rulers in the Himalayan region patronized Chamba Rumal embroiderers. The original Chamba embroideries were done by women or young children, the embroideries often depicted gods or goddesses. Original Chamba embroideries were very important in marriages as the embroideries were kept as the brides dowry. Chamba embroideries often began by drawing an outline on the rectangular square of fabric, while originally embroidered by women at the height of popularity in the 18th century many male painters drew the outlines and embroidered the clothe themselves to ensure high quality work. Not long after its height of popularity in the 18th century the chamba rumal's popularity declined. The rumals began to lose their sacredness, today most rumals are made by families trying to sell them to survive, and the Chamba Rumals are not of the same quality as they were in the 17th and 18th century. While this art style has declined over the years and almost been lost, in 2009 Lalita Vakil was given the Shilp Guru award for her ability and skill in Chamba embroidery.

== Chikankari (Uttar Pradesh) ==
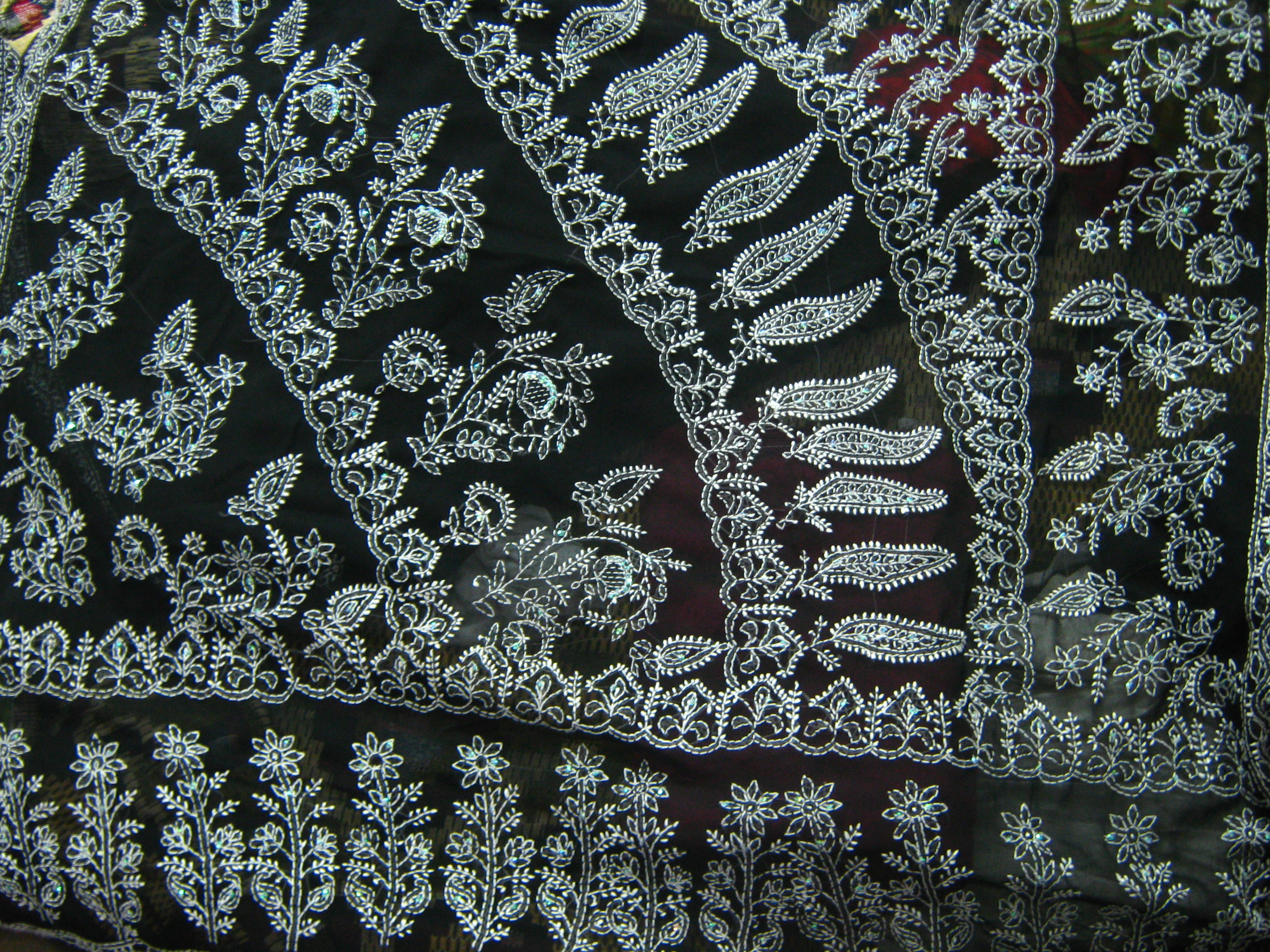
Chikan embroidery on a saree pallu

The present form of chikan (meaning elegant patterns on fabric) work is associated with the city of Lucknow, in Uttar Pradesh. Chikan embroidery on silk is Lucknow's own innovation. The other chikan styles are that of Calcutta and Dacca. However, characteristic forms of stitch were developed in Lucknow: phanda and murri.

Chikan embroidery is believed to have been introduced by Nur Jahan, the wife of Jahangir. Chikan embroidery involves the use of white thread on white muslin (tanzeb), fine cotton (mulmul), or voile, fine almost sheer fabrics which showcases shadow work embroidery the best. Other colours can also be used.

The artisans usually create individual motifs or butis of animals and flowers (rose, lotus, jasmine, creepers). The designs are first printed onto the fabric not with chaulk, but with a mixture of glue and indigo.

At least 40 different stitches are documented, of which about 30 are still practiced today and include flat, raised and embossed stitches, and the open trellis-like jaali work. Some of the stitches that are used in Chikankari work include: taipchi, pechni, pashni, bakhia (ulta bakhia and sidhi bakhia), gitti, jangira, murri, phanda, jaalis etc. In English: chain stitch, buttonhole stitch, French knots and running stitch, shadow work. Another is the khatao (also called khatava or katava).

== Gota (Jaipur, Rajasthan) ==
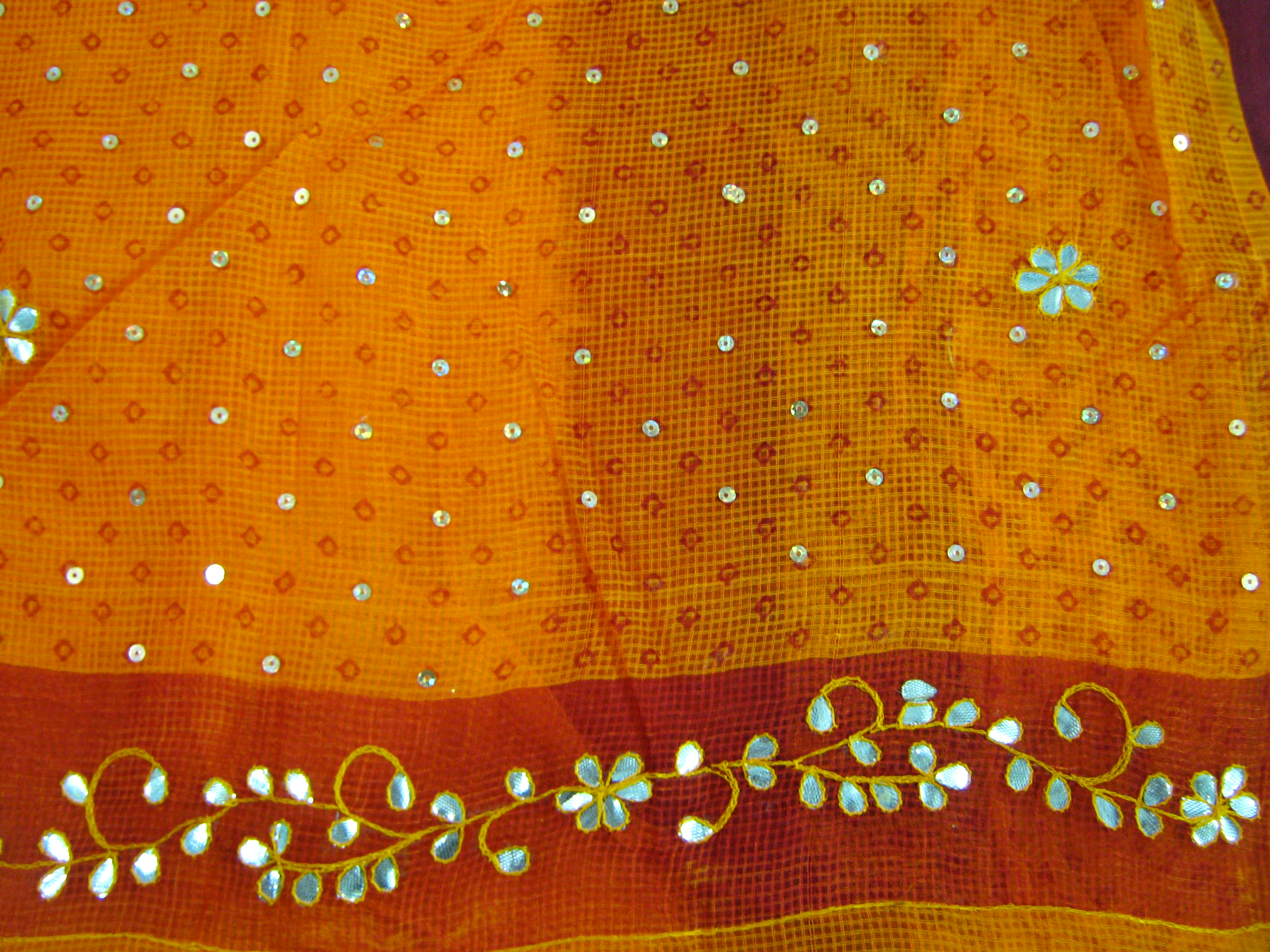
Kota sari with gota patti

It is a form of appliqué in gold thread, used for women's formal attire. Small pieces of zari ribbon are applied onto the fabric with the edges sewn down to create elaborate patterns. Lengths of wider golden ribbons are stitched on the edges of the fabric to create an effect of gold zari work. Khandela in Shekhawati is famous for its manufacture. The Muslim community uses Kinari or edging, a fringed border decoration. Gota-kinari practiced mainly in Jaipur, utilising fine shapes of bird, animals, human figures which are cut and sewn on to the material.it is very famous in rajasthan as well as in many other parts of the world.

== Kamal kadai (Andhra Pradesh) ==
Is an embroidery from native Andhra Pradesh. Woven Trellis stitch is used to make flowers and leaves and other stitches are done on fabric to complete the embroidery.

== Kantha (Bengal) ==
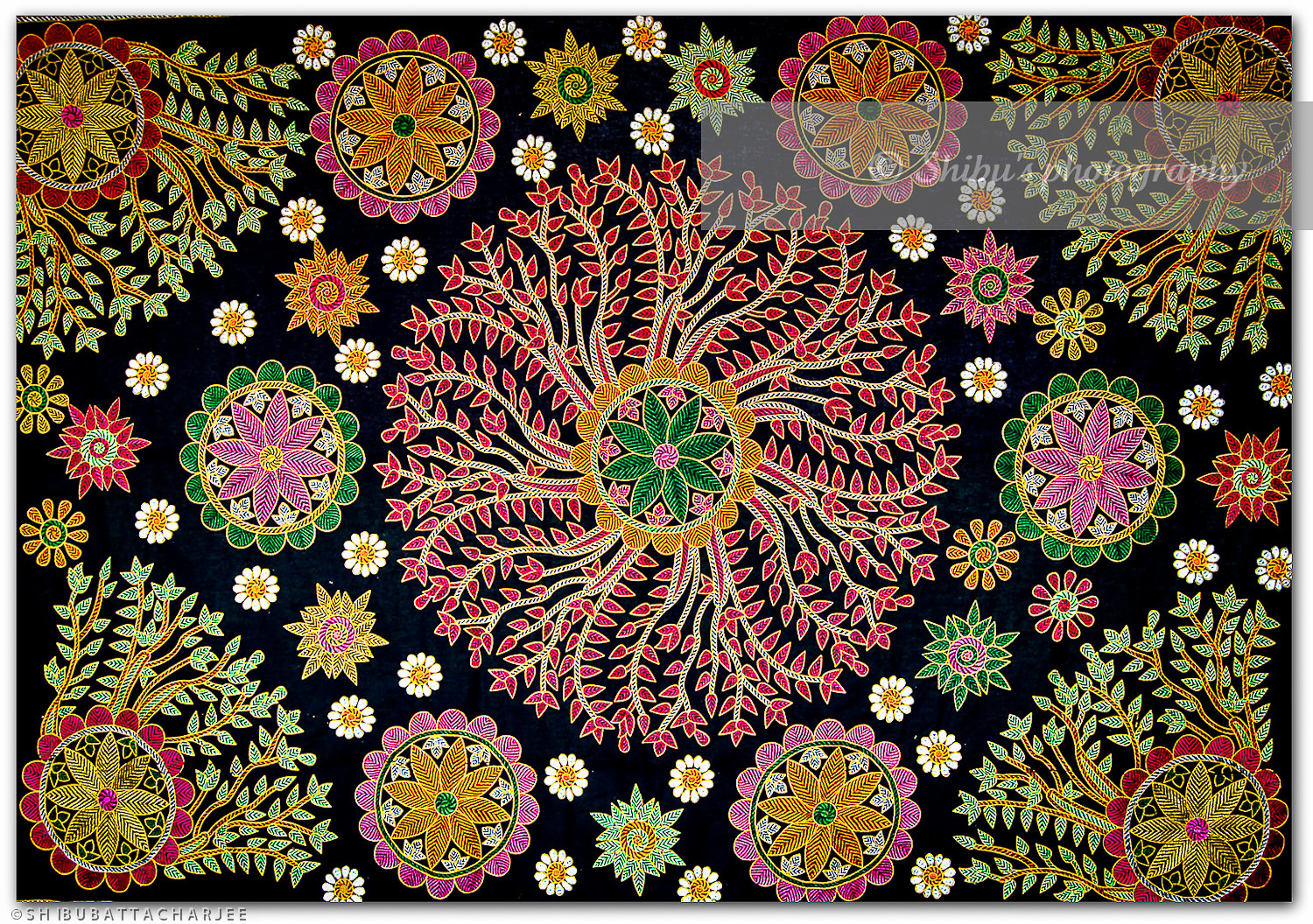
Modern Naksi kantha

Naksha is embroidery on many layers of cloth (like quilting), with running stitch. It is also known as dorukha which mean the designs/motifs are equally visible in both sides: there is no right or wrong side so both side are usable. Traditionally, worn out clothes and saris were piled together and stitched into quilts. Rural Bengali women still do this with cotton saris, the embroidery thread being taken from the sari border. It started as a method of making quilts, but the same type of embroidery can also be found on saris, salwar suits, stoles, napkins, etc. Themes include human beings, animals, flowers, geometric designs and mythological figures.

== Karchobi - Rajasthan ==
It is a raised zari metallic thread embroidery created by sewing flat stitches on cotton padding. This technique is commonly used for bridal and formal costumes as well as for velvet coverings, tent hangings, curtains and the coverings of animal carts and temple chariots.

== Kasuti or Kasuthi (Karnataka) ==
Kasuti (Kai=hand and Suti = weave /wrap) comes from the state of Karnataka, Kasuti is originated in Karnataka during chalukya period (6th to 12th century) and done with single thread and involves counting of each thread on the cloth. The patterns are stitched without knots, so that both sides of the cloth look alike. Stitches like Gavanti, Murgi, Negi and Menthi form intricate patterns like gopura, chariot, palanquin, lamps and conch shells, as well as peacocks and elephants, in fixed designs and patterns.

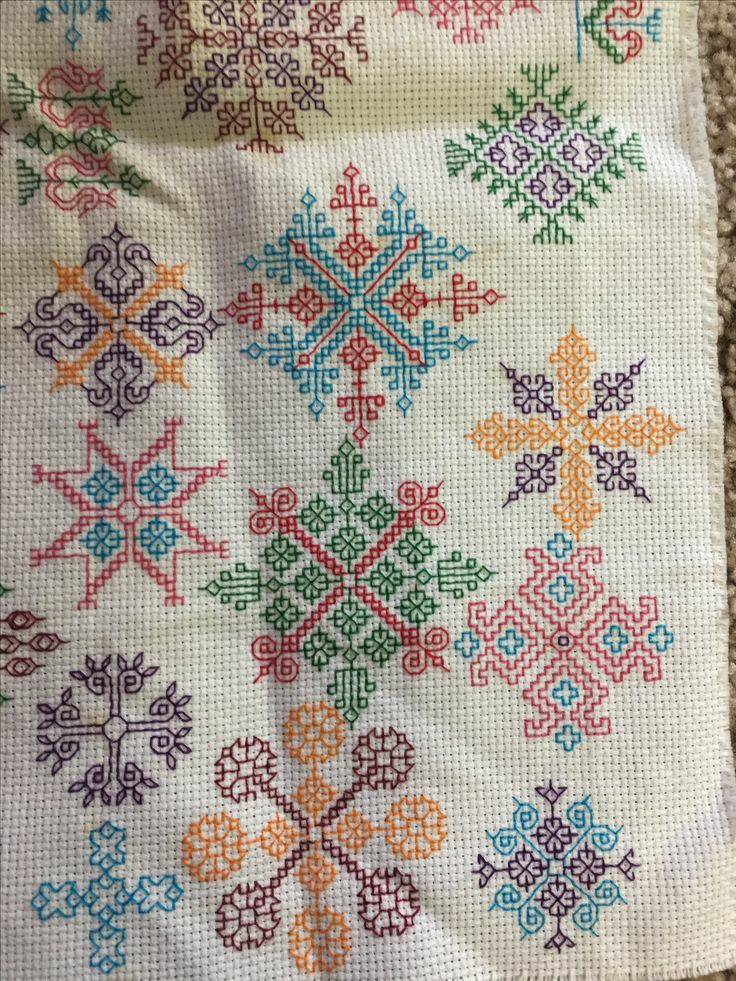
Motifs of kasuti embroidery

== Kathi (Gujarat) ==
Kathi embroidery was introduced by 'Kathi' the cattle breeders, who were wanderers. This technique combines chain stitch, appliqué work and mirror-like insertions.

== Kaudi (Karnataka) ==
Kaudi (ಕೌದಿ) is a blanket or bedspread and applique embroidery from Karnataka. Old Fabrics are cut into pieces and stitched with simple running stitch, and Gubbi Kaalu stitch.

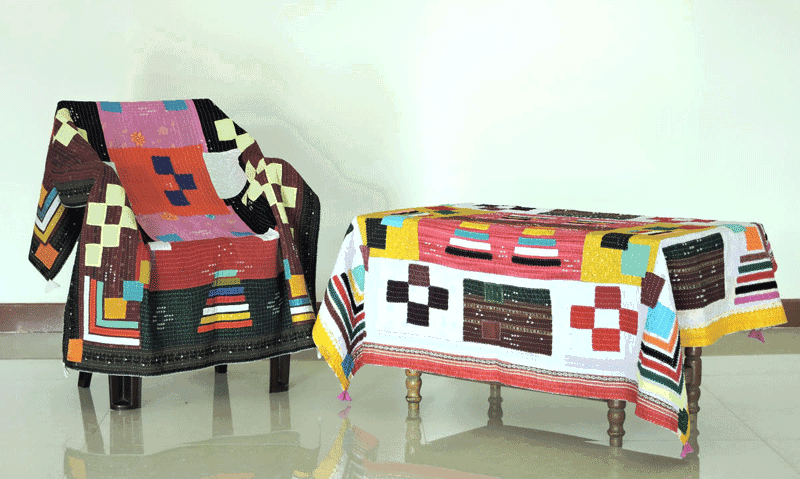
Kaudi: pride of Karnataka

== Khneng (Meghalaya) ==
Is an embroidery from Meghalaya. Mustoh village is only known place for khneng embroidery and the embroidery is traditionally Done on eri silk shawls.

== Kutch or Aribharat ==
The best known of the Kutch (Gujarat) embroidery techniques is Aribharat, named after the hooked needle which forms the chainstitch. It is also known as Mochibharat, as it used to be done by mochis (cobblers).

== Kutchi bharat/Sindhi stitch (Gujarat) ==
A variation of Kutch work, this geometric embroidery starts with a foundation framework of herringbone stitch or Cretan stitch, and then this framework is completely filled with interlacing. It is said that this technique originated in far away land of Armenia and found its way to Gujarat by travelling Nomads. Sindhi stitch or Maltese cross stitch is also similar but the innovation of the Kutchi women have taken it beyond the traditional designs meow Kutch work

== Kashmiri embroidery ==
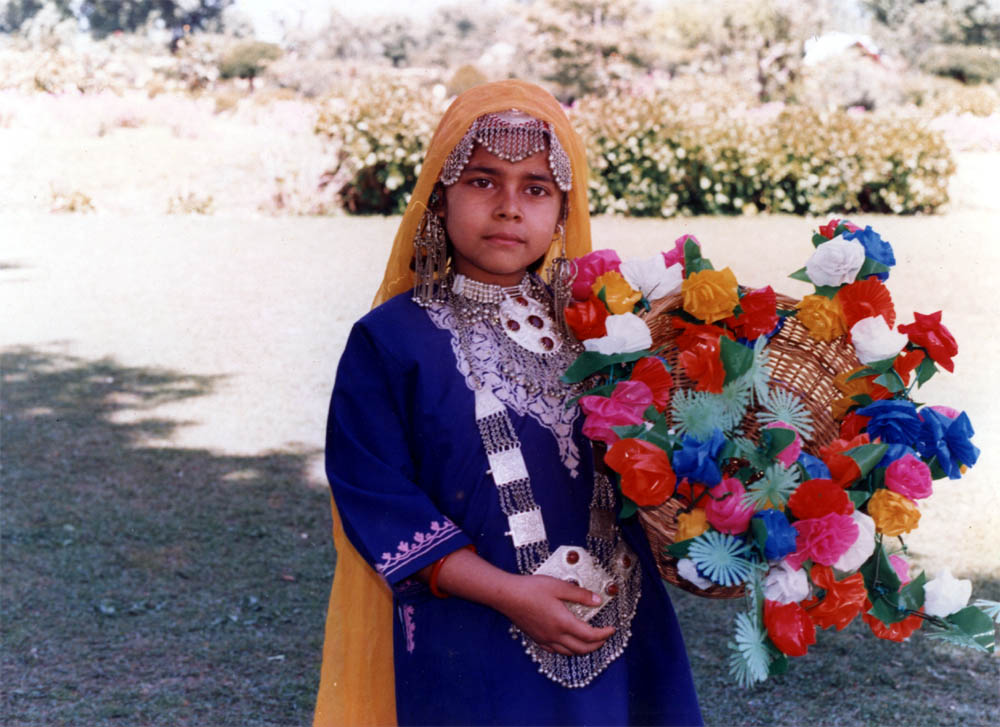
Kashmiri phiran

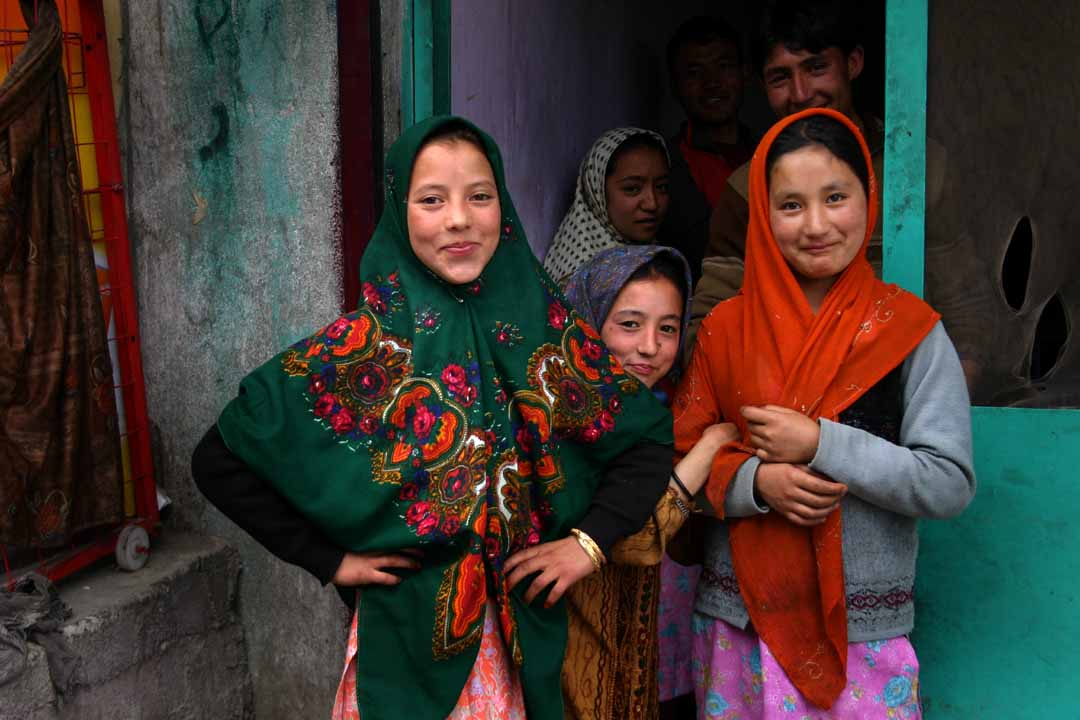
Kashmiri embroidery

=== Kashmiri Kashida ===
Kashmiri embroidery (also Kashida) is originated during Mughal period and used for phirans (woolen kurtas) and numnahs (woollen rugs) as well as stoles. It draws inspiration from nature. Birds, blossoms and flowers, creepers, chinar leaves, ghobi, mangoes, lotus, and trees are the most common themes. The entire pattern is made with one or two embroidery stitches, and mainly chain stitch on a base of silk, wool and cotton: the colour is usually white, off-white or cream but nowadays one can find stoles and salwar-kameez sets in many other Colours such as brown, deep blue, sky blue, maroon and rani pink. Kashida is primarily done on canvas with crystal threads, but Kashida also employs pashmina and leather threads. Apart from clothes, it is found on home furnishings like bed spreads, sofa and floor cushions, and pillow covers.

The base cloth, whether wool or cotton, is generally white or cream or a similar shade. Pastel colors are also often used. The craftsmen use shades that blend with the background. Thread colors are inspired by local flowers. Only one or two stitches are employed on one fabric.

Kashmiri embroidery is known for the skilled execution of a single stitch, which is often called the Kashmiri stitch and which may comprise the chain stitch, the satin stitch, the slanted darn stitch, the stem stitch, and the herringbone stitch. Sometimes, the doori (knot) stitches are used but not more than one or two at a time.

=== Kashmiri stitches ===
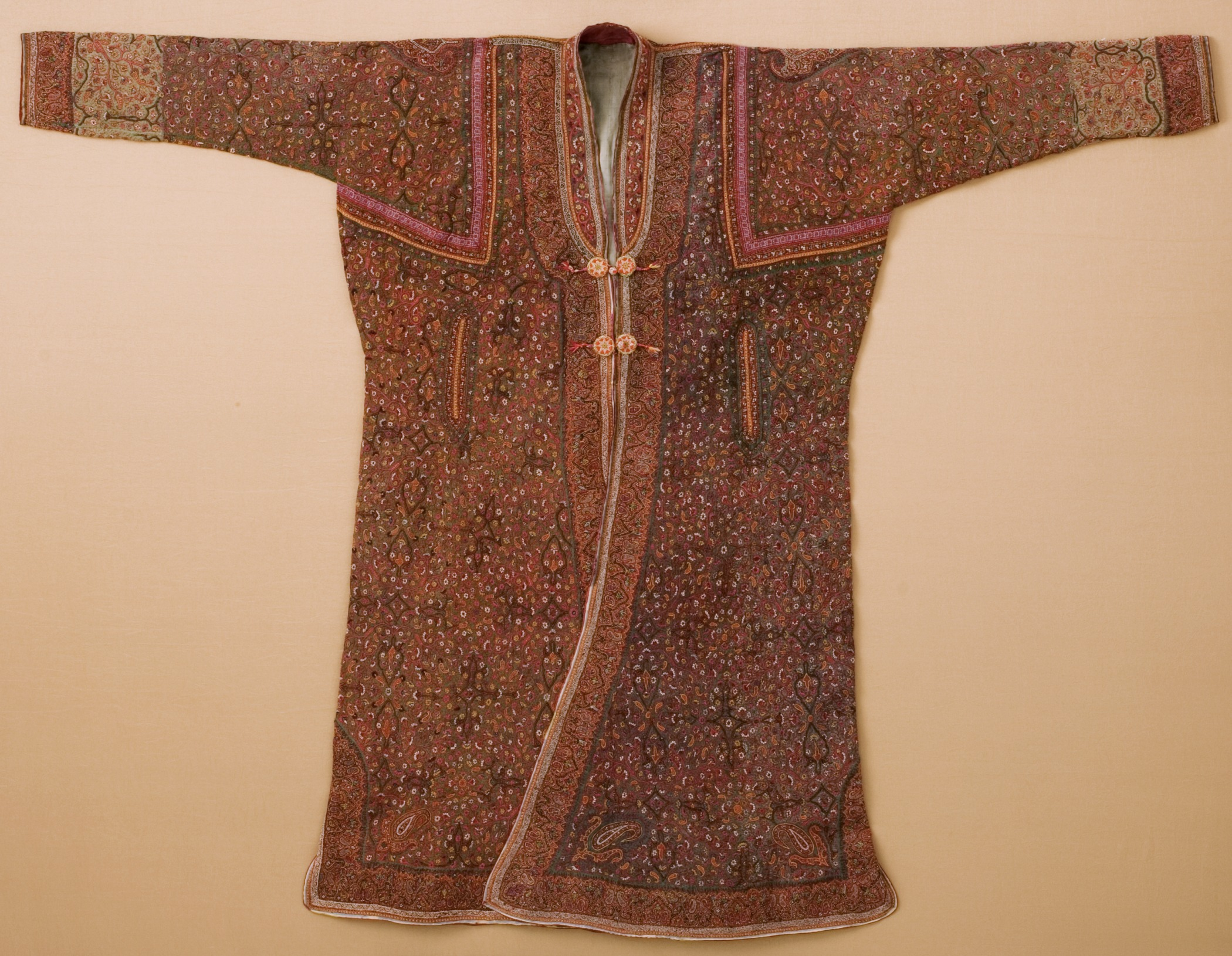
Man's Coat (Chogha) Kashmir 19th century

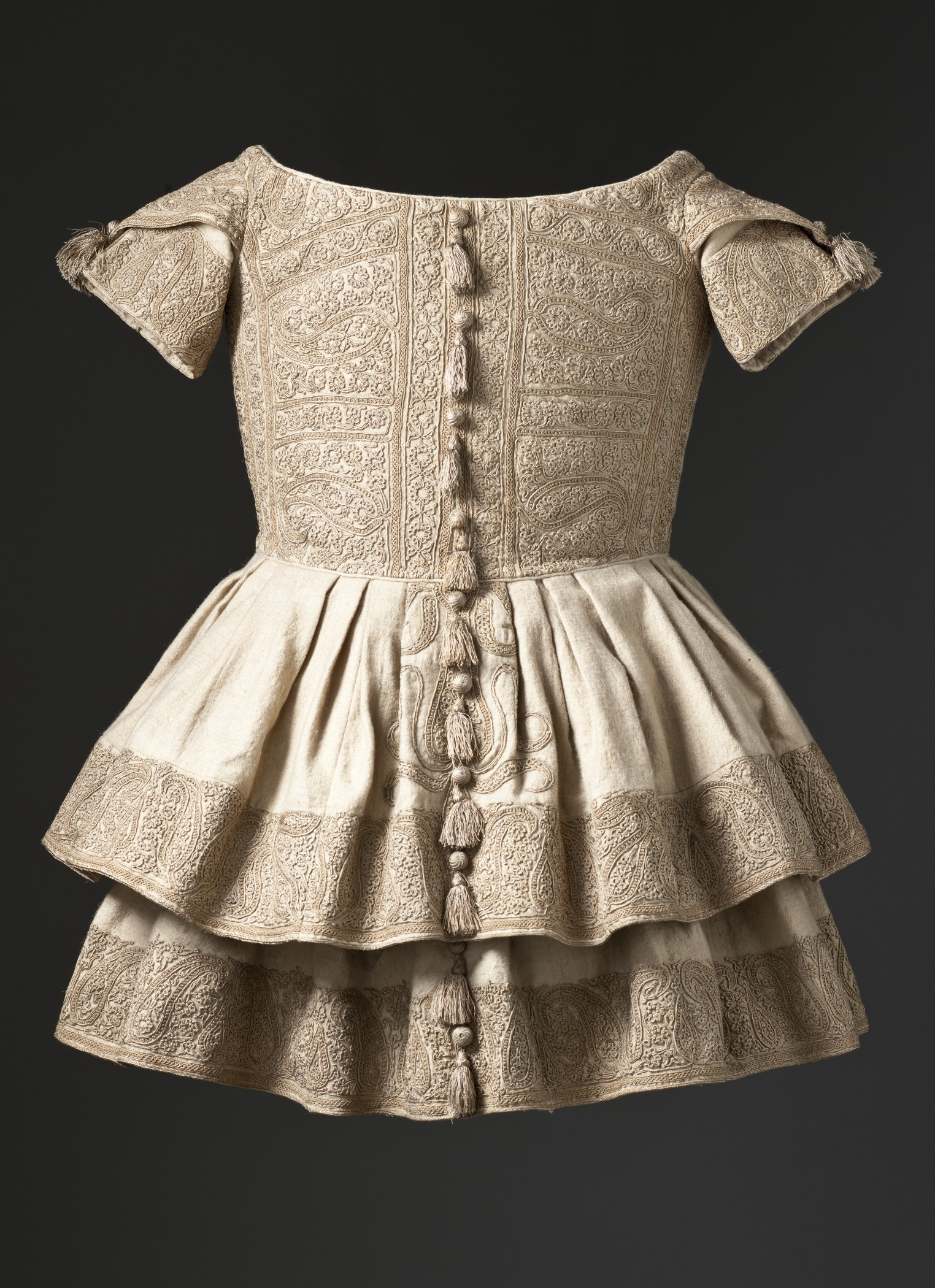
Boy's Frock Kashmir 19th century

The stitches include sozni (satin), zalakdozi (chain) and vata chikan (button hole). Other styles include dorukha in which the motif appears on both sides of the shawl with each side having a different color; papier-mâché; aari (hook) embroidery; shaaldaar; chinar-kaam; samovar (the antique Kashimiri tea-pot) is a very typical and popular design used in Kashmiri embroidery. The samovar pattern is then filled up with intricate flowers and leaves and twigs; Kashir-jaal which implies fine network of embroidery, particularly on the neckline and sleeves of a dress material.

Further styles include naala jaal which involves embroidery particularly on the neckline and chest/yoke: naala means neck in the Koshur dialect of Kashmiri language; jaama is a very dense embroidery covering the whole base fabric with a thick spread of vine/creepers and flowers, badaam and heart shapes, a variation of this form is neem-jaama, where neem means demi or half, because the embroidery is less dense, allowing a view of the fabric underneath; and jaal consisting of bel-buti: a fine and sparse net of vine/creepers and flowers. Variation of this form is neem-jaal, where again the work is less dense.

== Mukaish Work- (similar to chikankari) -Lucknow ==
Small rectangular pieces of metal are squeezed shut around some threads of the fabric. Mukesh work (known also as badla or fardi), includes women making shiny stitches amid chikan embroidery using a needle and long, thin strips of metal.

== Phool Patti ka Kaam (Uttar Pradesh) ==
Flower embroidery of Uttar Pradesh, especially in Aligarh.

== Phulkari (Punjab and Haryana) ==
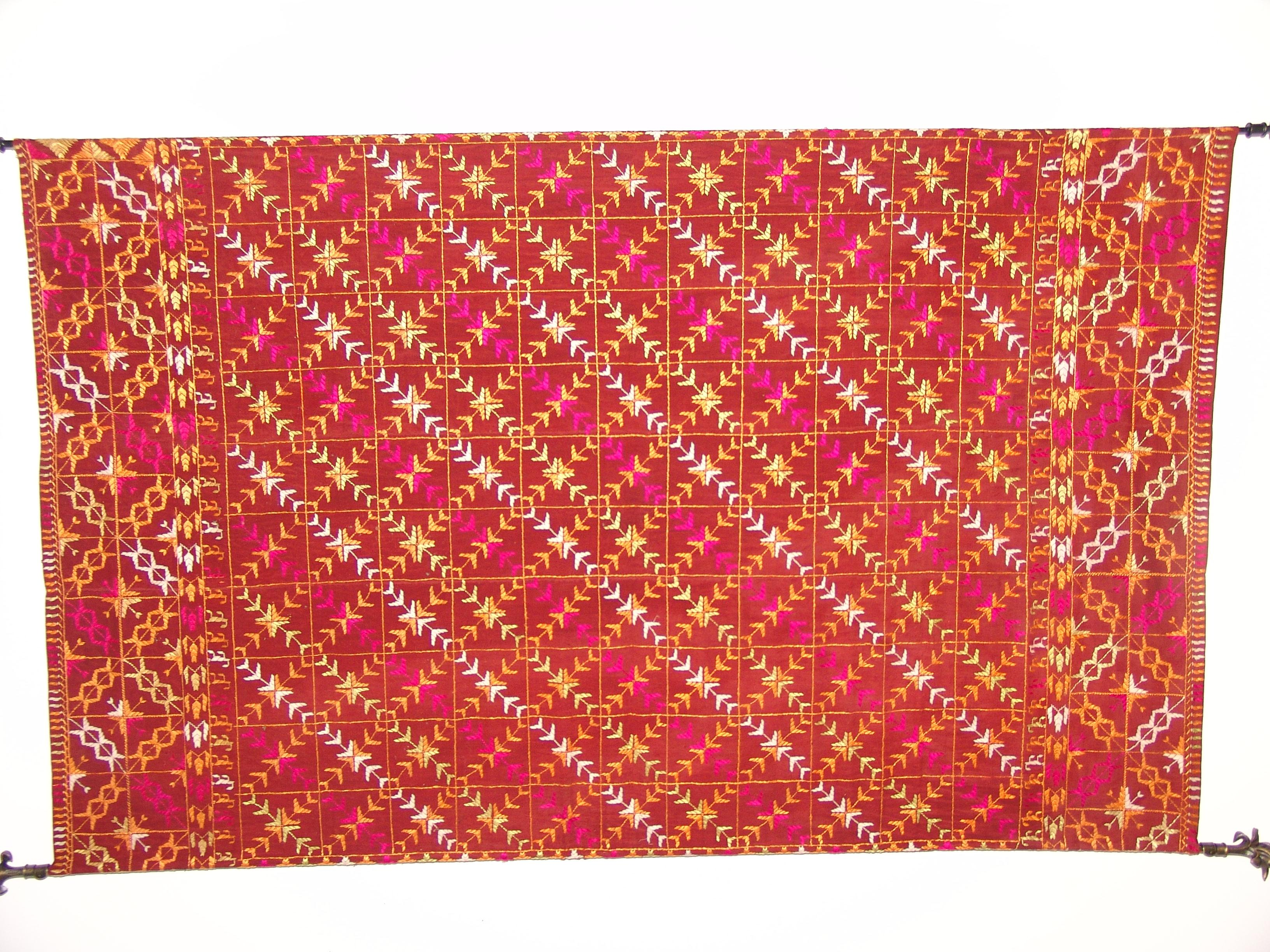
Patiala Phulkari

Phulkari (Phul=flower, Kari=work) is originated in the late 17th century in Punjab region. the most famous rural embroidery tradition of Punjab, mentioned in the Punjabi folklore of Heer Ranjha by Waris Shah. Its present form and popularity goes back to 15th century, during Maharaja Ranjit Singh's reign Phulkari also means headscarf, and it comes from the 19th century tradition of carrying an odhani or a head-scarf with flower patterns. Its distinctive property is that the base is a dull hand-spun or khadi cloth, with bright coloured threads that cover it completely, leaving no gaps. It uses a darn stitch done from the wrong side of the fabric using darning needles, one thread at a time, leaving a long stitch below to form the basic pattern. Famous for Phulkari are the cities of Amritsar, Jalandhar, Ambala, Ludhiana, Nabha, Jind, Faridkot, and Kapurthala. Other cities include Gurgaon (Haryana), Karnal, Hissar, Rohtak and Delhi. Bagh is an offshoot of phulkari and almost always follows a geometric pattern, with green as its basic colour.

=== Other styles ===
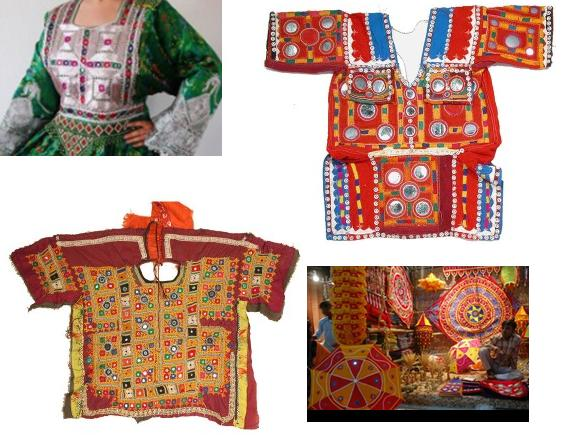
Saraiki kurti

The embroidery styles of the Punjab region include kalabatun embroidery using thin wires. Kalabatan surkh involves using gold wires on orange coloured and red silk. Kalabatan safed involves using silver wires on white material. There are two kinds of gold embroidery, one of a solid and rich kind called kar-chob and the other called tila-kar or kar-chikan utilising gold thread. The former is used for carpets and saddle cloths whereas the latter is used for dresses. The Punjab region also uses mukesh embroidery: mukesh bati-hui, twisted tinsel, mukesh gokru, flattened gold wire for embroidery of a heavy kind, and waved mukesh, made by crimping mukesh batihui with iron tongs. Ludhiana and Amritsar are known for embroidery using white, silver and gold threads on clothes such as chogas and waistcoats (phatuhi). Patchwork is also a tradition of the region.

== Pichhwai (Rajasthan) ==
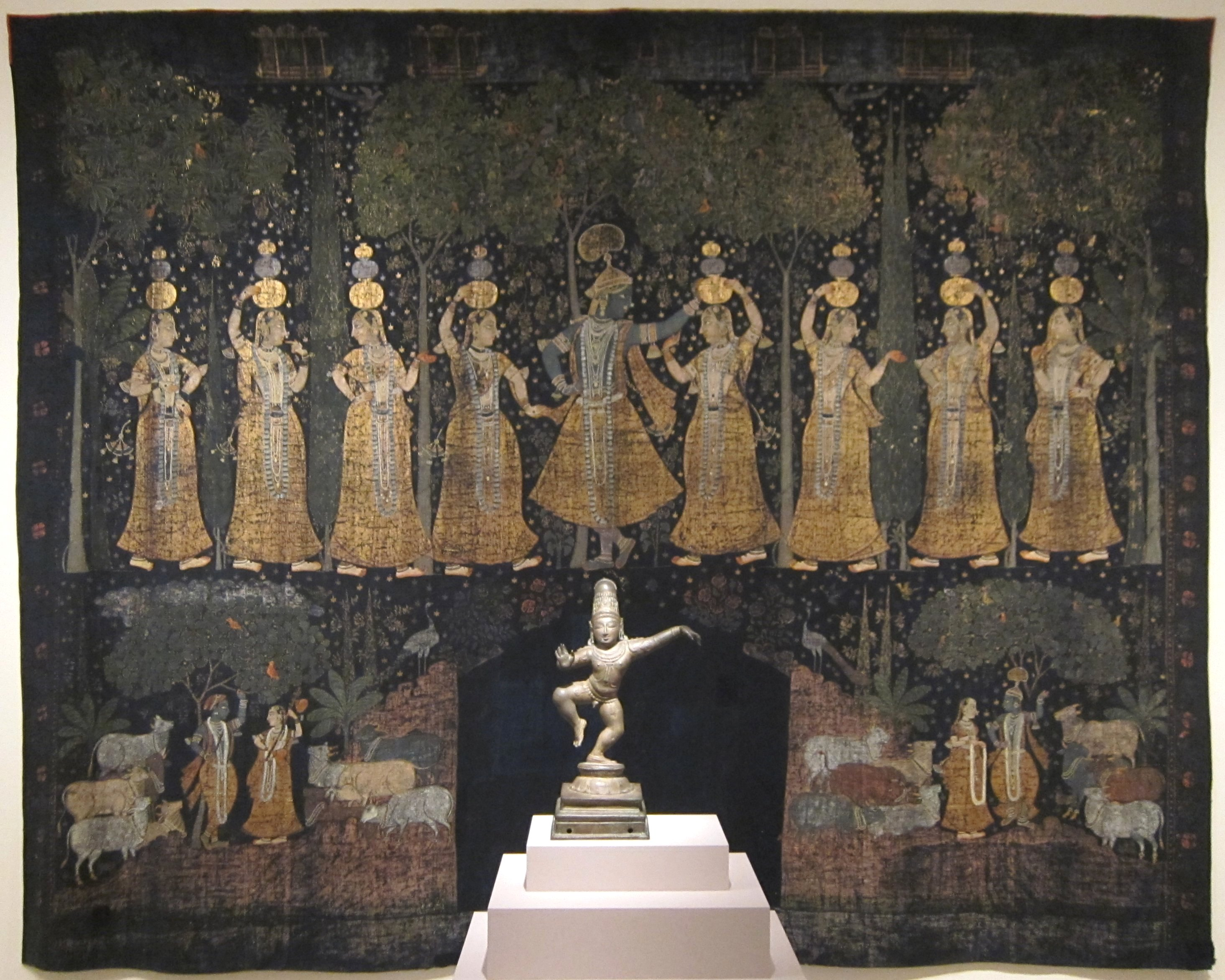
'Playful Gifts and other Gopi Scenes', 'pichwai' from Golconda, India, late 17th century, dyed cotton with polychrome and gold, Honolulu Academy of Arts

Colourful embroidered cloth-hangings made in Nathdwara, Rajasthan. The central themes focus on Lord Krishna.

== Pipli (Odisha) ==
Appliqué or Pipli work originates from the Pipli village in Odisha and some parts of Gujarat. It is called Chandua based on patchwork: brightly coloured and patterned fabric pieces are sewn together on a plain background mostly velvet along with Mirror and lace work. Designs include Hindu gods, human forms, animals, flowers and vehicles. Originally Chandua work was done to build the chariots for Puri Rath Yatra and was also used for parasols, canopies and pillows for the Rath Yatra. Nowadays different home décor items can be found, such as lamp shades, garden umbrellas and bed covers and utility products like Hand bags, Wallets, Files.

== Rabari (Rajasthan and Gujarat) ==
This embroidery style is made by the Rabari or Rewari community of Rajasthan and Gujarat. This very colourful embroidery style, using stark contrast was traditionally used only for garments, but now it can be found on bags, accessories, home furnishings, etc. Mirrors of all shapes and sizes are incorporated in the embroidery, as a result of the belief that mirrors protect from evil spirits. Designs include not only flowers and fruit and animals such as parrots and elephants, but also temples, women carrying pots, and the ubiquitous mango shape.

== Shamilami (Manipur) ==
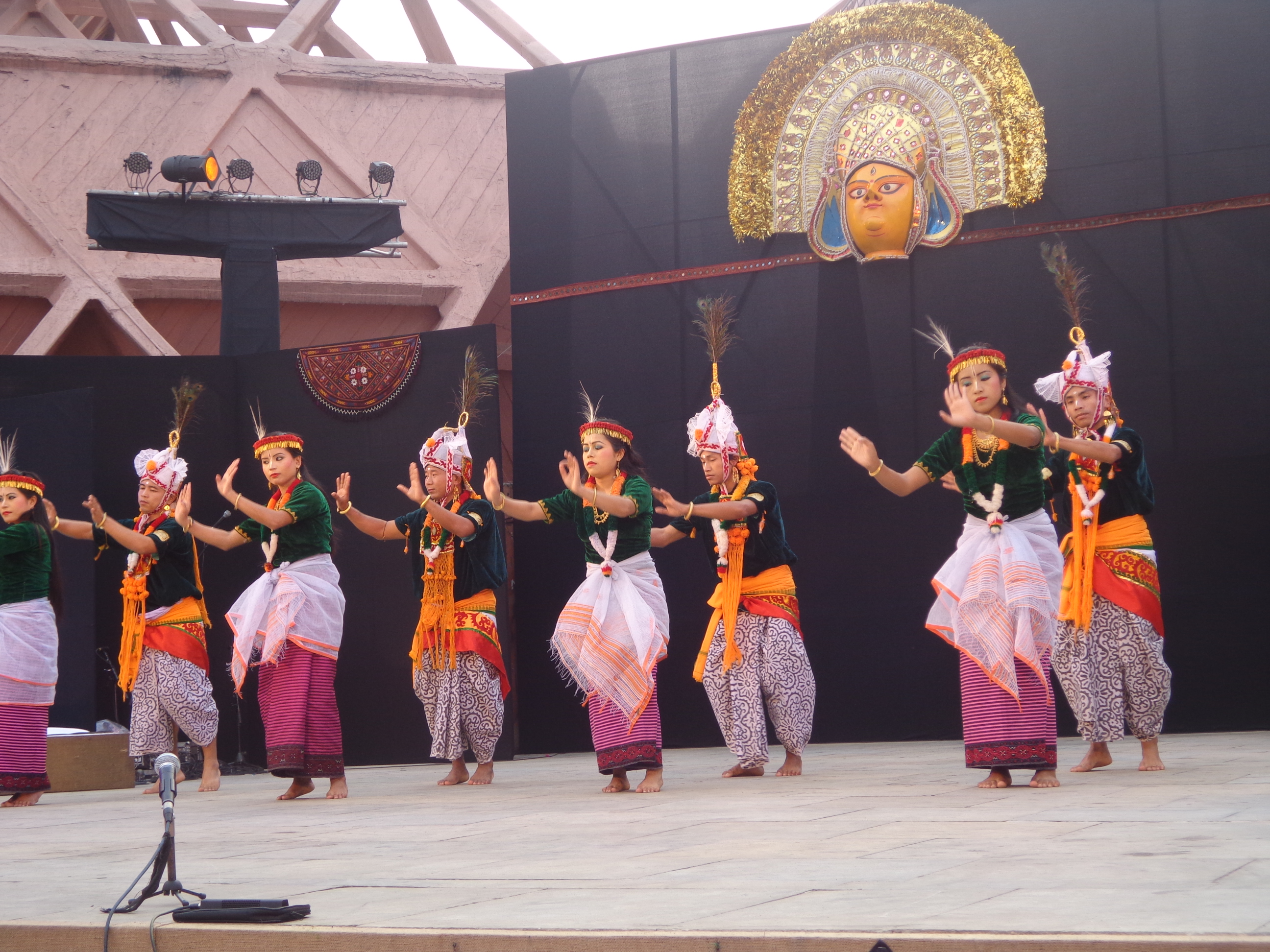
Lai haraoba (Manipur festival) Manipur dress

A combination of weaving and embroidery and was once a high status symbol.

== Shisha or Mirrorwork (Gujarat, Haryana, Rajasthan) ==
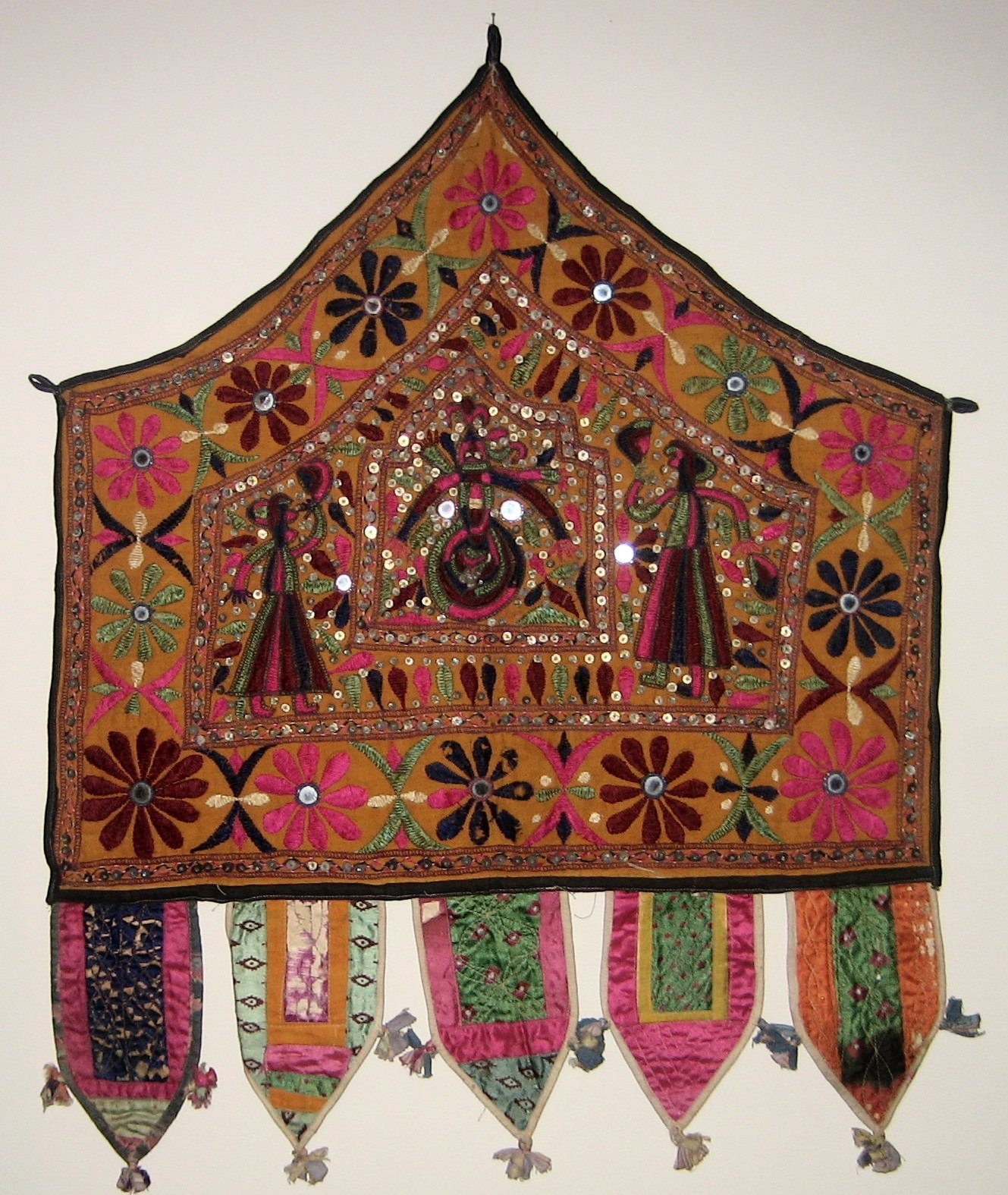
Altar Cloth (Toran), Saurashtra, Gujarat, India, 20th Century, cotton, metal and mirror pieces. plain weave with embroidery and mirror work, Honolulu Academy of Arts

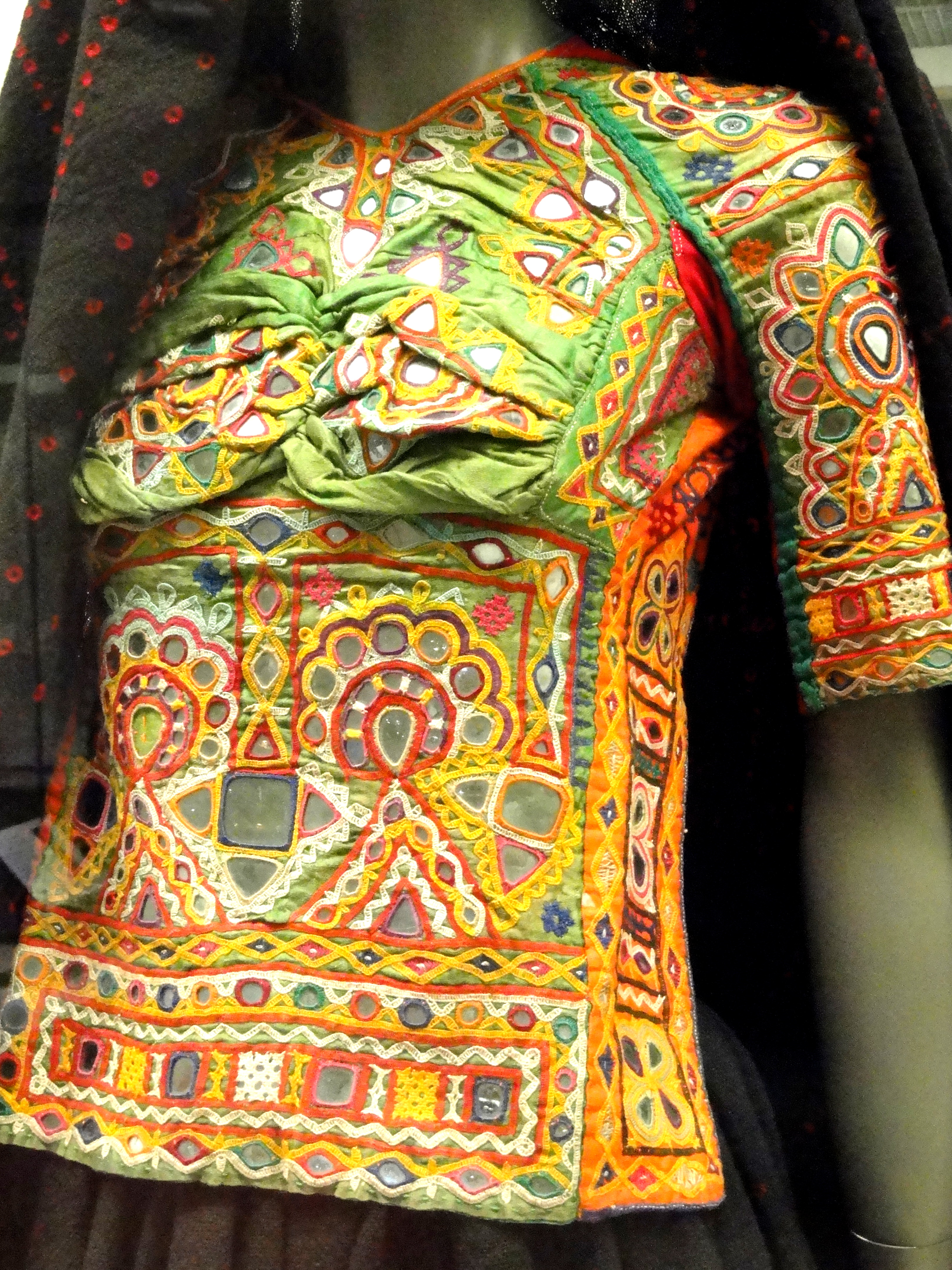
India (Gujarat), woman's costume, 1970s-1980s - Bunka Gakuen Costume Museum - DSC05309

This ornamentation method originated in Persia during 13th century and involves little pieces of mirror in various sizes which are encased in the decoration of the fabric first by interlacing threads and then with buttonhole stitch.

The reflective pieces may originally have developed from naturally occurring mica; from the 19th century onwards, specially made mirrored glass became widely available. The word shisha means glass or mirror in Persian and Hindi. Until recently they were all irregular, made by hand, and used mercury, nowadays one can also find them machine made and regularly shaped. It is usually found in combination with other types of stitches like cross stitch, buttonhole stitch and satin stitch, nowadays not only by hand but also by machine. Mirrorwork is very popular for cushion covers and bedcovers, purses and decorative hangings as well as in decorative borders in women's salwar-kameez and sari. Thousands of women from kutch (Gujarat) and sikar, churu (Rajasthan) are engaged in doing hand embroidery work like tie, mirror work, beads on fabric.

There are various types of Chikan work: Taipchi, Bakhia, Phunda, Murri, Jaali, Hathkati, Pechni, Ghas Patti, and Chaana Patti.

== Toda embroidery ==
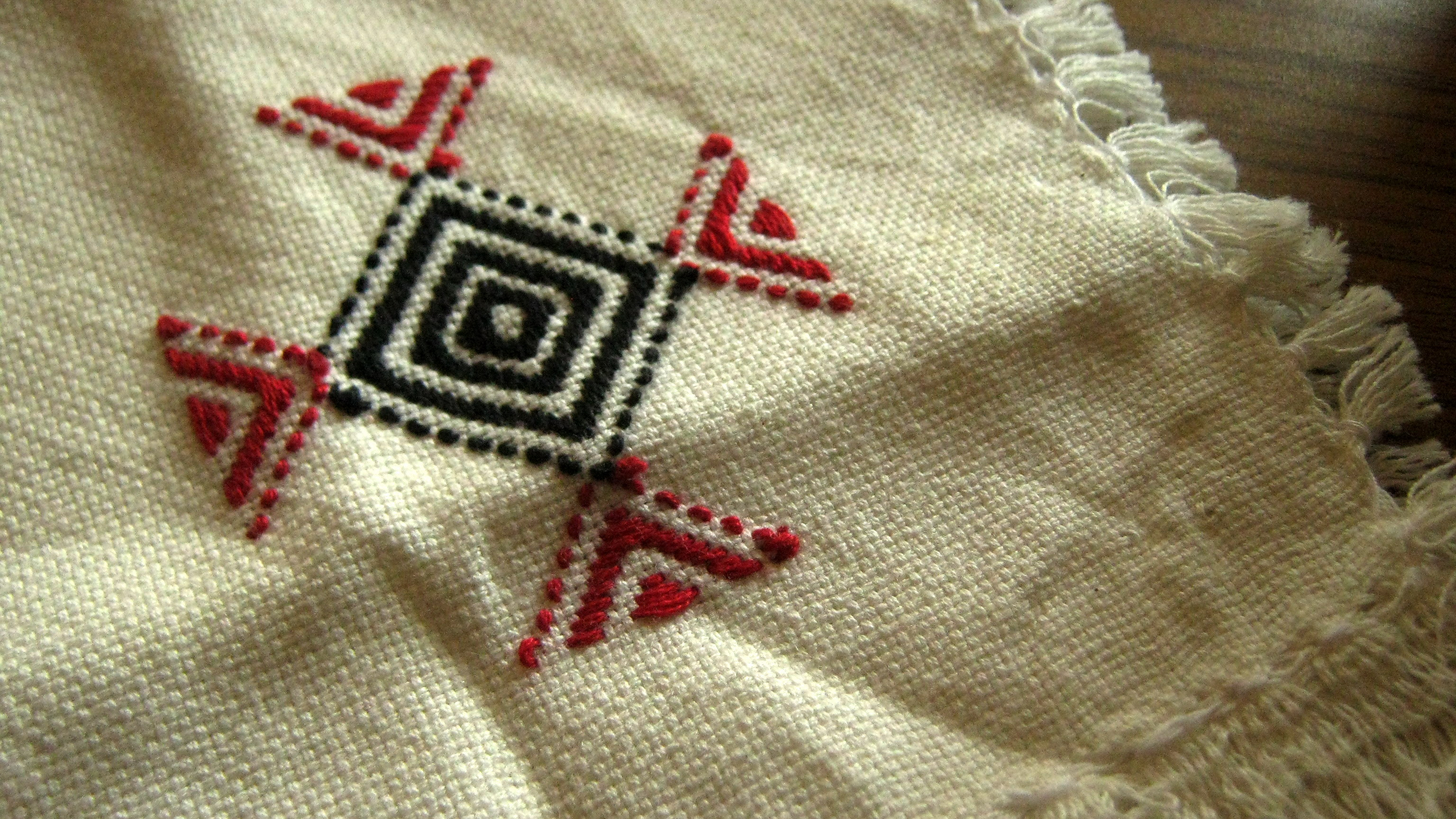
Embroidery work Kotha Primitive Tribal Community, (PTGs) in Nilgiri, Tamil Nadu. Also known as Cross Stitches Embroidery

The Toda embroidery has its origins in Tamil Nadu. The Nilgiri Hills, inhabited by the Todu community have their own style called pugur, means flower. This embroidery, like Kantha, is practiced by women.

The embroidery adorns the shawls. The shawl, called poothkuli, has red and black bands between which the embroidery is done. As Todas worship the buffaloes, buffalo becomes an important motif in the Toda embroidery among mettvi kaanpugur, Izhadvinpuguti and others. Stylized sun, moon, stars and the eye of the peacock feathers are used in Toda embroidery.

== Zardozi or Zari or kalabattu ==
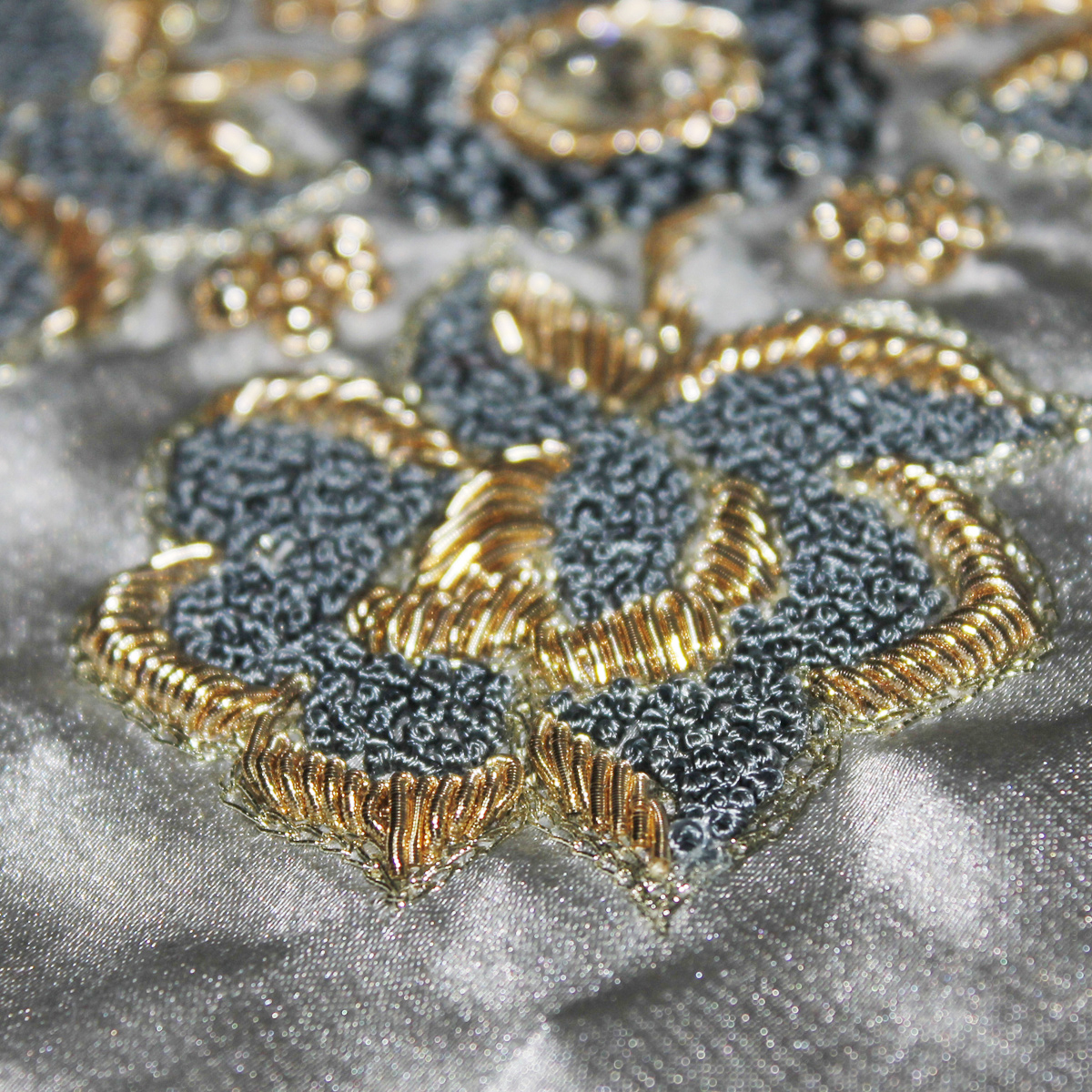
Close Shot of the Zardozi (Zardouzi) Embroidery Cushion Covers

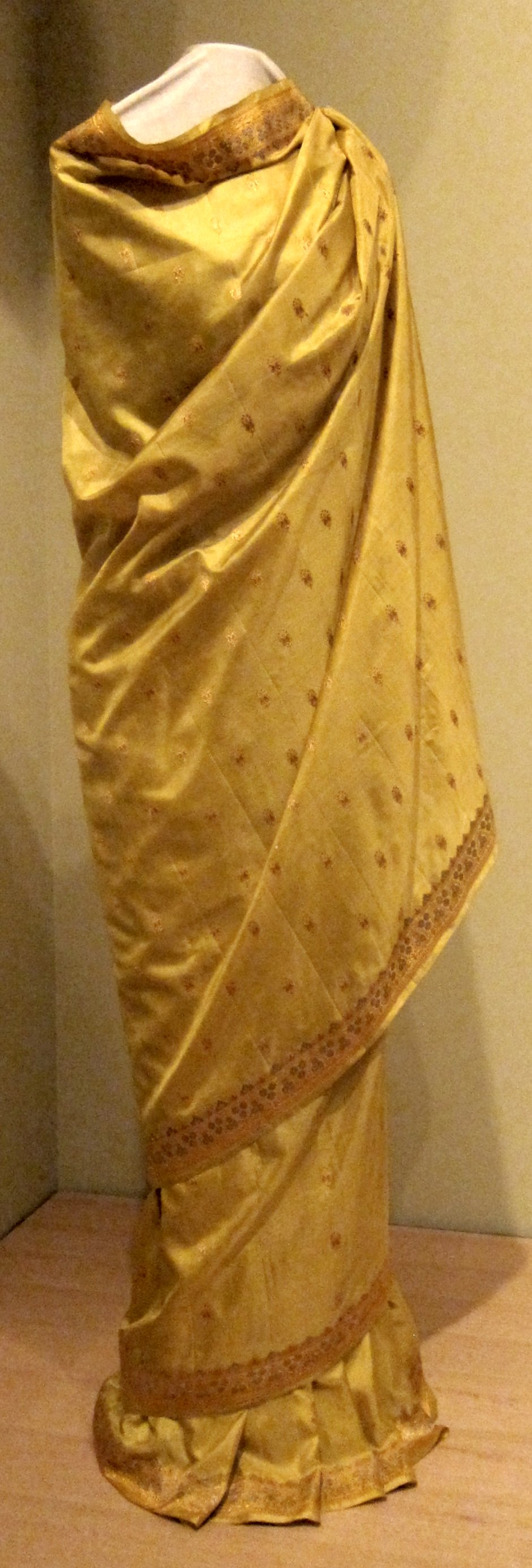
Sari from India (probably Benares), late 19th or early 20th century, silk with metallic thread (Zari)

The most opulent form of Indian embroidery is the Zari and the Zardozi or Zardosi, known since the late 16th century, brought in India by the Moghuls. The word Zardozi comes from the two Persian words, Zar (gold) and Dozi (embroidery). This form uses metallic thread.

Once real gold and silver thread was used, on silk, brocade and velvet fabric. Metal ingots were melted and pressed through perforated steel sheets to convert into wires, which then were hammered to the required thinness. Plain wire is called 'badla', and when wound round a thread, it is called 'kasav'. Smaller spangles are called 'sitara' and tiny dots made of badla are called 'mukais' or 'mukesh'.

Zardozi is either a synonym or a more elaborate version of zari where the gold or silver embroidery is embellished with pearls and precious stones, gota and kinari, making this art only affordable by rich people. Nowadays Zardosi thread has a plastic core and a golden-coloured outside. The thread consists of coiled metal wires placed on the right side of the fabric and couched with a thinner thread.
