= Suta Group =

- Company type: Corporate headquarters
- Founded: 2015 (Acquired Elite Asia Pacific founded 2008)
- Headquarters: Gangnam District, Seoul, 135010, South Korea, France
- Area served: 160 countries
- Key people: Lawrence Choi, Chief Executive Officer; Thomas Zilliacus, Chairman (former CEO Nokia Asia Pacific
- Divisions: Events & Media; Educations; Performance; Fashion; Models; Clients; Licensing; Joint Ventures; Art + Commerce; Pageantry The Miss Supertalent Organization; Supertalent Fashion Week; Supertalent Star Record; European Destination Management
- Website: www.supertalentgroup.com

Supertalent Group, originally known as the Supertalent of the World or Suta Group, headquartered in Seoul and Singapore, is a talent management and global events organizer. Miss Supertalent and Supertalent Fashion Week are the event and awards brands of Suta Group.

== Miss Supertalent ==
Miss Supertalent is a twice-yearly global television media event that has run since 2011. Several models have been discovered at the competition, including Meriam George (Egypt), Milett Figueroa (Peru), Maria Sten (Denmark), Diana Arno (Estonia), Malina Joshi (Nepal), Lada Akimova (Russia), Chloe Veitch (UK) and Natali Varchenko (Ukraine).

== Supertalent Fashion Week ==
A unit of Miss Supertalent, known as Korea International Fashion Week. Previous venue locations include the Korea International Exhibition Center, Daegu Textile Complex, Incheon International Airport, Eiffel Tower, Galeries Lafayette, Paris, Jungfrau, Schilthorn, Interlaken, Ferrari museum, Modena, Galleria Vittorio Emanuele II, and Milan.

== Supertalent Star Record ==
Supertalent Group, in collaboration with Challenge Headquarters, launched the Supertalent World Record. This entity officially verifies performance records in areas of human achievement, entertainment, sports and politics. Psy, Ban Ki-moon, Song Hae, Hong Soo-hwan, Jin Yong, Cho Yong-pil, Park Chan-ho, Lee Seung-yuop, Jang Mi-ran, Cho Yong-pil are recipients of a Supertalent World Record.

== Supertalent Art School ==
Suta Art School is an entertainment School in Korea exclusively created for vocal, dancing, acting, hair, make-up. It is a joint-venture partnership with Born Star, operating 15 campuses both in Korea, China and USA. Alumni include members of Infinite, Kara, Hello Venus, Kim Yu-mi (beauty pageant titleholder) and Girl's Day.

== Joint ventures ==
Suta Group operates joint ventures with Yuuzoo Corporation a Singapore listed social media company and The Times Group.

== Partnership ==
As of October 2021:

- Museum Enzo Ferrari
- Société d'Exploitation de la Eiffel Tower
- Los Angeles Fashion Week
- Vancouver Fashion Week
- Yuuzoo Corporation
- World Electronic Sports Games by AliSports, Yuuzoo
- Relativity Media by Yuuzoo
- The Times Group
- Fashion One
- Goyang International Flower Festival
- Supertalent Fashion Week
- Supertalent Art School
