= Manav Rachna International Institute of Research and Studies =

Private university in Haryana, India

- Former names: Career Institute of Technology and Management (1997-2012); Faridabad Institute of Technology (2000-08); Manav Rachna International University (2012-18)
- Type: Deemed university
- Established: 1997 (29 years ago)
- Accreditation: NAAC, UGC
- President: Prashant Bhalla
- Vice-president: Amit Bhalla
- Location: Faridabad, Haryana, India; 28.4496°N 77.2851°E
- Campus: 60 acres (24 ha); Suburban
- Website: manavrachna.edu.in

Manav Rachna International Institute of Research and Studies (MRIIRS), formerly Manav Rachna International University (MRIU), is a private university located in Faridabad, Mohali as well as other places in India.

== Accreditation ==
Manav Rachna International Institute of Research and Studies (MRIIRS) is a National Assessment and Accreditation Council (NAAC) accredited A++ grade university. It was granted the Deemed university status under Section 3 of the UGC Act 1956, as Manav Rachna International University.

== Campus ==
=== Faridabad campus ===
The campus covers 60 acres (0.24 km^{2}) with buildings for engineering, applied sciences, and business studies, as well as an auditorium and central library. Students live in hostels with a separate facility for international students. An indoor sports hall was officially opened by Abhinav Bindra in 2010.

=== Sonipat campus ===
The university is scheduled to expand to Rajiv Gandhi Education City, Sonipat, in 2018.

== Dr. O. P. Bhalla Central Library ==
The university has a central library with books, journals, and digital learning resources.

== Admissions ==
For undergraduate applicants, Manav Rachna accepts the MRNAT (Manav Rachna National Aptitude Test), the (Uni-GAUGE-E), and the SAT in its admissions processes for domestic and international applicants.

=== B.Tech. ===
In addition to the tests above, admission to B.Tech. courses is primarily through results obtained in the All India Engineering Entrance Exam conducted by the Central Board of Secondary Education every year. Over one thousand students are accepted into the first year of B.Tech. programs annually.

Students with a three-year diploma from a recognised polytechnic in the state can apply for direct admission to the second year of the B.Tech. program through an online exam organised by the MRIU.

=== M.Tech. ===
Admission to the M.Tech. program is evaluated on the basis of performance in the Graduate Aptitude Test in Engineering (GATE).

=== M.C.A. ===
Admission to this program is via the Online Entrance Test for Master of Computer Applications (OLET-MCA) conducted by Haryana State Counseling Society (HSCS).

=== MBA ===
Admissions to the three year MBA course require a bachelor's or postgraduate degree (or equivalent) and taking the Management Aptitude Test (MAT) conducted by the All India Management Association (AIMA).

== Rankings ==
University and college rankings

Engineering – India
- NIRF (2024): 101-150

Dental – India
- NIRF (2024): 38

The National Institutional Ranking Framework (NIRF) ranked it 38th among Dental colleges in India and in the band 101-150 band among engineering colleges in 2024.

== Examination system ==
Each academic year is divided into two semesters. Each semester has two internal exams (sessional exams) and one final exam (semester exam) for all theory subjects. For laboratory courses there is one internal exam followed by the final semester exam. Most of the exams are theoretical like most other engineering colleges in India.

== Training and placement ==
The university has a Training and Placement department that helps its graduates find employment. The Corporate Resource Centre connects students with employers.

== Research activities ==
Between 2006 and 2011, the faculty of the university published 643 research publications in national and international journals and conferences.

== Notable alumni ==
- Roopam Sharma - Research Scientist and Innovator
- Srishti Rana - Model and Miss Asia Pacific World 2013
- Abhishek Verma - Athlete in shooting and has received many awards in the games for his ability.
