= Himangini Singh Yadu =

Indian beauty pageant titleholder (born 1988)

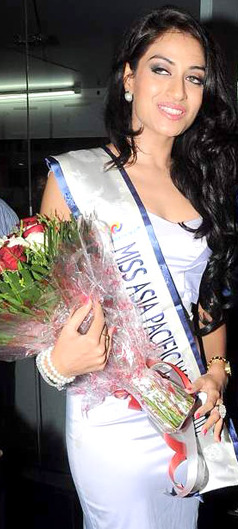
- Yadu in 2012
- Born: Indore, India
- Occupation: Model
- Beauty pageant titleholder
- Title: Miss Supertalent of the World 2012; Miss Supertalent of the World India 2012
- Hair color: Black
- Eye color: Green
- Major competitions: I AM She 2010 (Miss India Asia Pacific World)

Himangini Singh Yadu is an Indian beauty pageant titleholder who was crowned Miss Supertalent of the World 2012, in Seoul, South Korea.

== Biography ==
Himangini was born in Indore, Madhya Pradesh.

She was a contestant and a Top 10 finalist in the first edition of I Am She–Miss Universe India, held in 2010.

Awards and achievements
Preceded by Tanvi Singla	Miss India Asia Pacific World; 2012	Succeeded by Srishti Rana
Awards and achievements
Preceded by Diana Starkova	Miss Asia Pacific World; Miss Supertalent 2012	Succeeded by Srishti Rana
