= Miss Europe 2017 =

International beauty pageant

- Date: 13 May 2017
- Venue: Seoul, South Korea
- Entrants: 35
- Winner: Diana Kubasova; Latvia

Miss Europe 2017 is an international beauty pageant, which was held on 13 May 2017 in Seoul, South Korea, where representatives of 35 countries were competing for the title of the first beauty. The crown and the title “Miss Europe 2017” was given to the contestant from Latvia, 26 years old Diana Kubasova. This was the 60th edition of the Miss Europe pageant and the second under the Miss Europe Organization.

== Background ==
The contestant from Germany Alena Senatorova got the title of first runner-up, and the representative from Ukraine Nina Gorinyuk received the title of second runner-up. The new “Miss Europe 2017” Diana Kubasova was crowned by the last year's winner of the Miss Europe 2016 Diana Starkova from France with a valuable crown that's estimated worth is around 350,000 EUR. The crown is annually handed over to the winner of the Miss Europe contest since 2003.

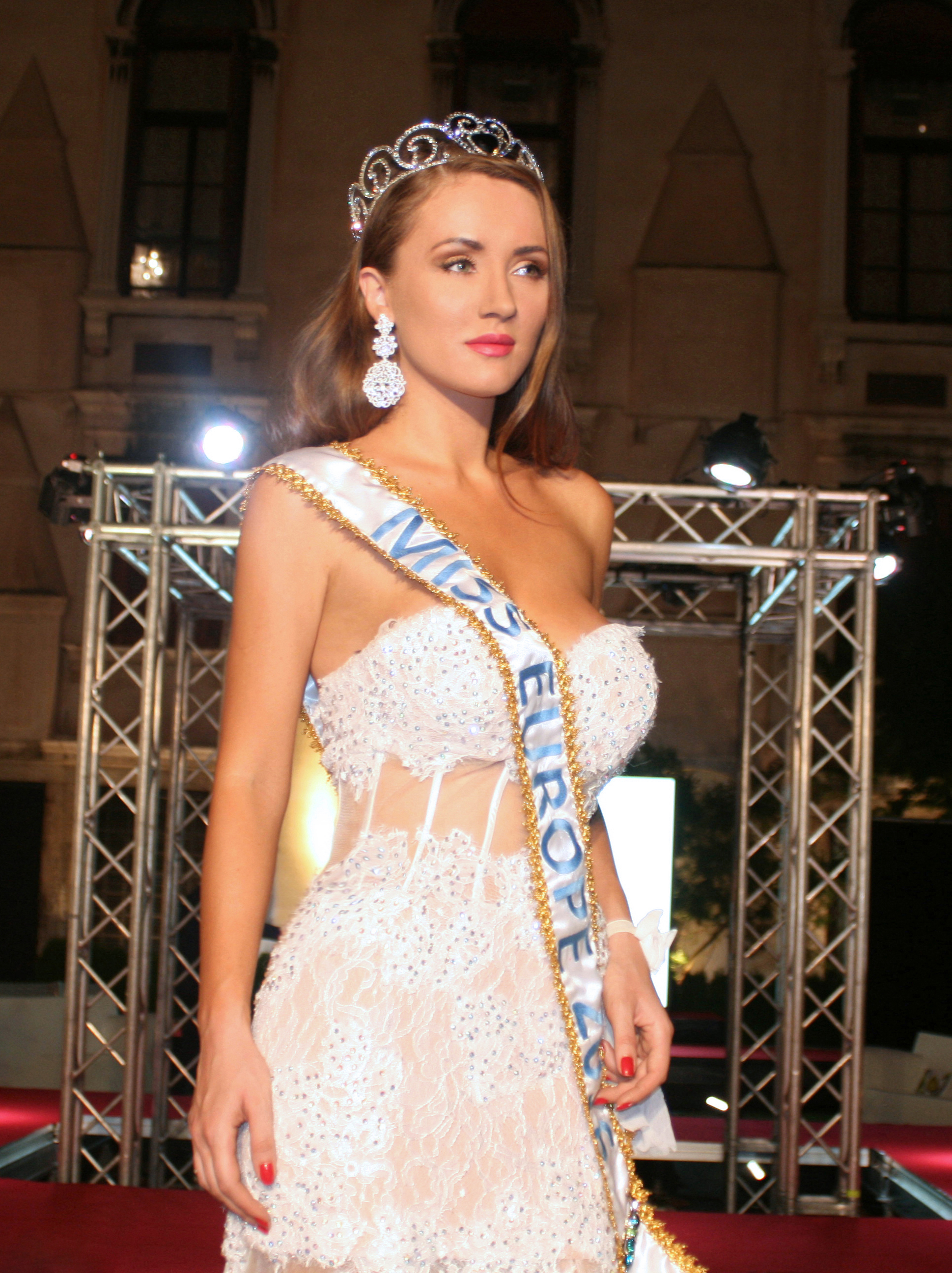
Miss Europe 2016 Diana Starkova

The crown was created by Chopard in 2003, specially for the Miss Europe contest. It has 678 diamonds set in 130 grams of white gold. It contains a rare dark centre/central diamond of 26.40 carats in the centre. Miss Europe 2017 title comes with a modeling contract and a professional representation by the Miss Europe Organization, a cash prize, a tiara with 678 diamonds mounted on in 130 grams of gold signed by Chopard and estimated worth 350,000 EUR, diamond jewelry set matching to the crownby Chopard, a one-year supply of make up products and tools from YSL, a shoe collection from Christian Louboutin, swimwear by La Perla, an evening gown by Elie Saab, a year's worth of skincare products from Guerlain, skincare and hair products from Kerastase and many other gifts.

The new Miss Europe 2017 Diana Kubasova already has some previous experience in beauty contests. Diana was named SEXIEST WOMAN ALIVE 2013 by the most influential beauty pageant news portal Global Beauties. She was chosen among the 400 beauties who competed in the five Grand Slam pageants (Miss Universe, Miss World, Miss Supranational, Miss International and Miss Tourism Queen) in 2013. The FHM Latvia magazine has also placed her as one of the top five in their 100 Sexiest Women In The World list several years in the row. As a model she has worked with a big large number of international brands like Guess, Maison Margiela, Zadig & Voltaire, Jaeger Lecoultre, Adidas, Armine, Galvanni, etc.

Kubasova speaks seven languages. She studied at the Stockholm School of Economics, where she received a BSc degree in Financial Economics and Business. Now she works as a model, appearing on the covers of magazines including FHM and Shape.

Kubasova planned to go on her first trip as Miss Europe 2017. She was invited to be a special guest on the red carpet of the Cannes Film Festival.

Both runners-up were invited to visit the Cannes Festival as well. However, Kubasova was to be accompanied only by first runner-up of Miss Europe 2017, Alena Senatorova, from Germany, and Miss Europe 2016, Diana Starkova, from France.

Nina Gorinyuk from Ukraine, the second runner up of Miss Europe 2017, did not go to Cannes. Among her prizes were an English study programme in Malta.

The winners of the Miss Europe 2017 contest put on haute couture outfits from the famous fashion houses for the red carpet of the Cannes festival. Many designers are competing to dress the most beautiful women in Europe, as the previous year's winner of the contest Miss Europe 2016, 26 year old Diana Starkova from France walked on the red carpet of Cannes while wearing a dress from Elie Saab. After that, she was chosen as the face of the brand Dolce Gabbana. Then Diana Starkova was seen as Miss Europe 2016 on the red carpet of the Venice Film Festival.

The Miss Europe contest has been held since 1927 and for the first time the representative of Latvia became its winner.

France has won the Miss Europe competition eight times, most recently in 2016. Germany and Spain have each won the competition seven times.

== Results ==
=== Placements ===
| Placement | Contestant |
|---|---|
| Miss Europe 2017 | Latvia – Diana Kubasova |
| 1st Runner-Up | Germany – Alena Senatorova |
| 2nd Runner-Up | Ukraine – Nina Gorinyuk |

== Contestants ==
Some of the delegates for Miss Europe 2017:

- Belgium – Lenty Valentine Frans
- Bosnia & Herzegovina – Halida Krajšnik
- Croatia – Angelica Zacchigna
- Czech Republic – Barbora Hunková
- Denmark – Katjana Sthuill
- Finland – Mira Unnsunen
- France – Sonia Ait Mansour
- Germany – Alena Senatorova
- Hungary – Beata Viliszuk
- Iceland – Arna Ýr Jónsdóttir
- Italy – Leonora Cerentino
- Latvia – Diana Kubasova
- Lithuania – Inga Busbaitė
- Luxembourg – Pamela Tomis
- Malta – Martha Fenech
- Moldova – Daniela Marin
- Montenegro – Adela Zoranić
- Norway – Christina Waage
- Portugal – Flávia Joana María Gouveia Brito
- Romania – Teodora Dan
- Scotland – Amy Harrison
- Slovenia – Maja Taradi
- Spain – Noelia Freire Benito
- Turkey – Tansu Sıla Çakır
- Ukraine – Nina Gorinyuk
- Wales – Ffion Clare Moyle
