= Renu Sukheja =

Indian businesswoman

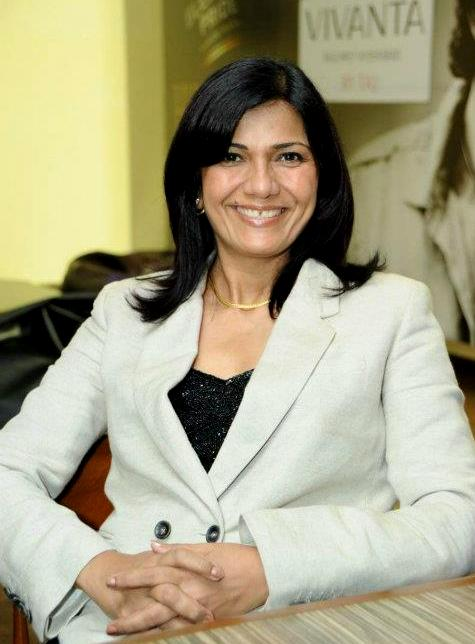
- Born: 25 December 1959 (age 66); Kolkata, West Bengal, India
- Height: 1.78 m (5 ft 10 in)
- Spouse: Raj Sukheja
- Children: Rohit Sukheja; Reha Sukheja

Renu Sukheja (Hindi: रेनू सुखेजा, Bengali: রেনু সুখেজা, Sindhi: ڙعنو صوڪحعجا; born 25 December 1959) is an Indian businesswoman, socialite and former model. She is the chief operating officer of Fashion and Media Consulting, Anthem Consulting Pvt. Ltd. With a career spanning more than two decades in the fashion industry, she is believed to be one of the most leading names in the world of fashion, media and showbiz in South India.

She has organised numerous grooming workshops for training girls for national and international beauty pageants selections, held across India and in Hyderabad. She has worked along with her husband, Raj Sukheja and renowned Indian Management Consultant Neeraj Gaba of I AM She – Miss Universe India fame in organizing various such grooming workshops for both men and women in various Indian cities. Hyderabad was the first city for this Pan India grooming wave. The event was managed by Anthem Entertainment, a division of Anthem Consulting Pvt. Ltd.

== Personal life ==
Renu Sukheja was born on 25 December 1959 in Kolkata, West Bengal. She grew up in Kolkata and completed her schooling and education there. After marrying Raj Sukheja, she moved to Hyderabad. She has two children, Rohit Sukheja and Reha Sukheja. Reha Sukheja is a successful Indian model and the first runner up at I AM She – Miss Universe India 2010. Reha is the first model from Hyderabad to make it into the Lakme Fashion Week.

== Professional life ==
Renu Sukheja is the chief operating officer of Fashion and Media Consulting, Anthem Consulting Pvt. Ltd. She has organized various Grooming workshops in many major Indian cities for both women and men and supported many Beauty Pageants, behind the Kalamandir Miss Hyderabad. She has also been a consultant for managing and setting up the Beauty Pageant scene in the Telugu movie Life Is Beautiful (2012 film) by Indian film director Sekhar Kammula.

== Limca World Record ==
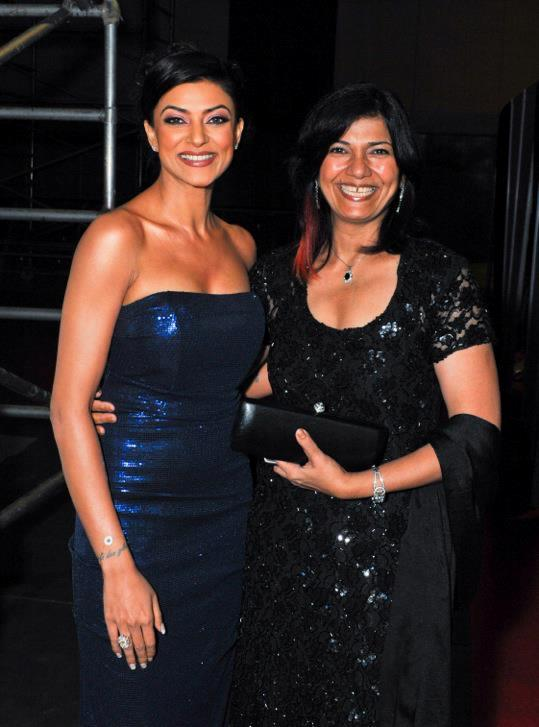
Renu Sukheja with former Miss Universe Sushmita Sen at the I AM She – Miss Universe India 2012

In the year 2010, at the age of 50, Renu Sukheja successfully attempted to set a world record for Elliptical Marathon. Renu Sukheja is now a World Record Holder Limca Book of Records for working out continually on the elliptical cross trainer (cardiovascular fitness equipment) for 15 hours at Helios Fitness Center in Hyderabad.
