= Roopam Sharma =

Indian computer scientist

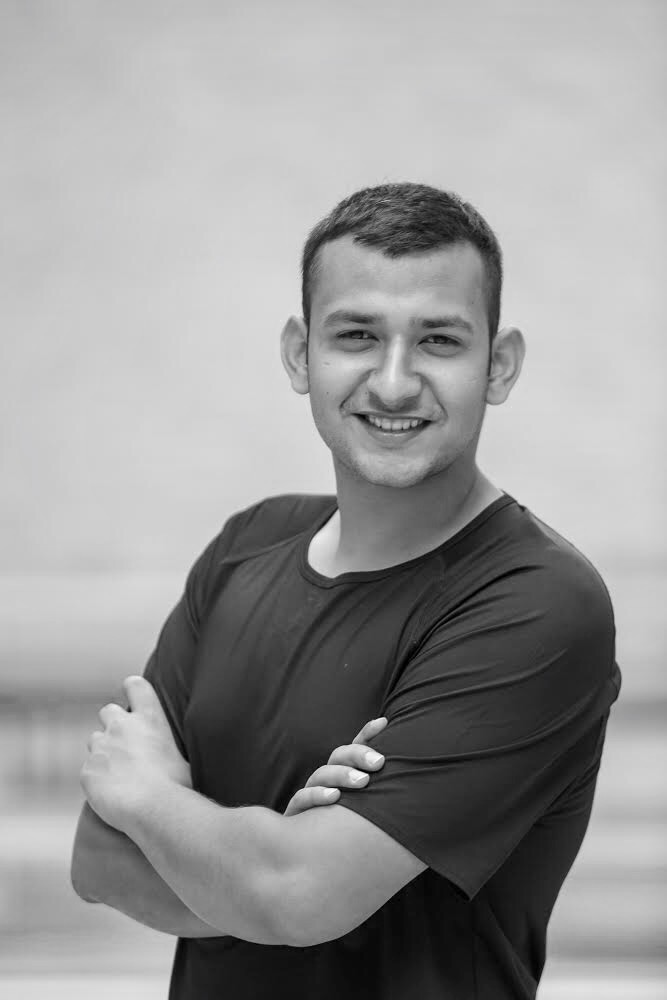
- Born: Roopam Sharma; 24 May 1995 (age 31); Faridabad, Haryana, India
- Education: Manav Rachna College of Engineering, Faridabad; Singularity University
- Occupations: Innovator, researcher
- Years active: 2014–present
- Awards: Gifted Citizen Prize 2016, MIT TR35 by Technology Review, Nominet Trust 100, Microsoft's Imagine Cup 2015 and CFC 2015, Yahoo Accenture Innovation Jockeys Seasons 3,4,5.
- Website: roopamsharma.com

Roopam Sharma (born 24 May 1995) is an Indian scientist. He is best known for his work on Manovue, a technology which enables the visually impaired to read printed text. His research interests include Wearable Computing, Mobile Application Development, Human Centered Design, Computer Vision, AI and Cognitive Science. Sharma was recently awarded the Gifted Citizen Prize 2016 and has been listed as one of the top 8 Innovators Under 35 by the MIT Technology Review for the year 2016 in India. In 2018, he was honoured as part of Asia's 21 Young Leaders Initiative in Manila.

== Early life, education and research ==
Sharma was born on May 24, 1995, in Faridabad, Haryana, India to Nirmal and Krishna Dutt Sharma. He has a brother Rahul and a sister Priyanka. He is an alumnus of Ryan International School, Faridabad and Modern Vidya Niketan, Faridabad and went on to study Bachelors of Technology in Computer Science and Engineering at Manav Rachna University in Faridabad, Haryana. Sharma began his research during his sophomore year of undergraduate school at Manav Rachna University.

== Inventions ==
Sharma's project Manovue, developed by Eyeluminati, is the world's first intelligent personal assisting system for the visually impaired. The technology has three main functions: to enable the user to read printed text by simply pointing over the text; to help the user to navigate freely outside well known environment through haptic feedback; and to use a completely voice-controlled mobile phone application.

Manovue was awarded as the winner of the Microsoft Imagine Cup 2015 and Yahoo Accenture Innovation Jockeys season 4. He was listed on the MIT Tech Review 35 under 35 list in 2016.

== Awards and achievements ==
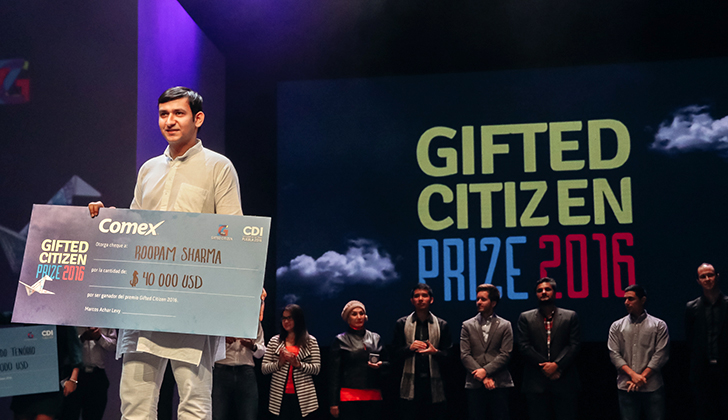
Sharma Receiving the Gifted Citizen Prize

Sharma was recently awarded the Gifted Citizen Prize 2016. He has also been listed as an innovator under 35 in 2016 by the Technology Review. Sharma was also named as a judge for the Living Talent Masterpiece 2017 and Accenture Innovation Jockeys Season 6.

The following is the list of notable awards and achievements received:

Year	Name	Awarding organisation
2017	National Youth Award	Ministry of Youth Affairs and Sports
2016	SE100 Inspiring Social Enablers List	SE100 Inspiring Social Enablers Programme
2016	Nominet Trust 100 List	Social Tech Guide By Nominet Trust
2016	Gifted Citizen Prize 2016	Ciudad de las Ideas
2016	MIT Technology Review Innovators Under 35	Technology Review
2016	Infymakers Award	Infosys
2016	Presidents Award	Manav Rachna University
2015	Winner: Microsoft YouthSpark Challenge for Change	Microsoft
2015	Grand Winner: Microsoft Imagine Cup India	Microsoft
2016	Torchbearer Award	Manav Rachna College of Engineering, Faridabad
2016	Yahoo Accenture Innovation Jockeys Season 5	Yahoo Accenture
2015	Yahoo Accenture Innovation Jockeys Season 4	Yahoo Accenture
2014	Yahoo Accenture Innovation Jockeys Season 3	Yahoo Accenture
