= Kubasov =

Kubasov (Russian: Кубасов) is a Russian masculine surname originating from the word kub (cube), referring to a short, stout person; its feminine counterpart is Kubasova. It may refer to

- Diana Kubasova (born 1989), Latvian beauty queen and model
- Valeri Kubasov (1935–2014), Soviet/Russian cosmonaut
