= Miss Supertalent of the World =

International beauty pageant

Miss Supertalent - Hoa Hậu Tài Năng Quốc Tế
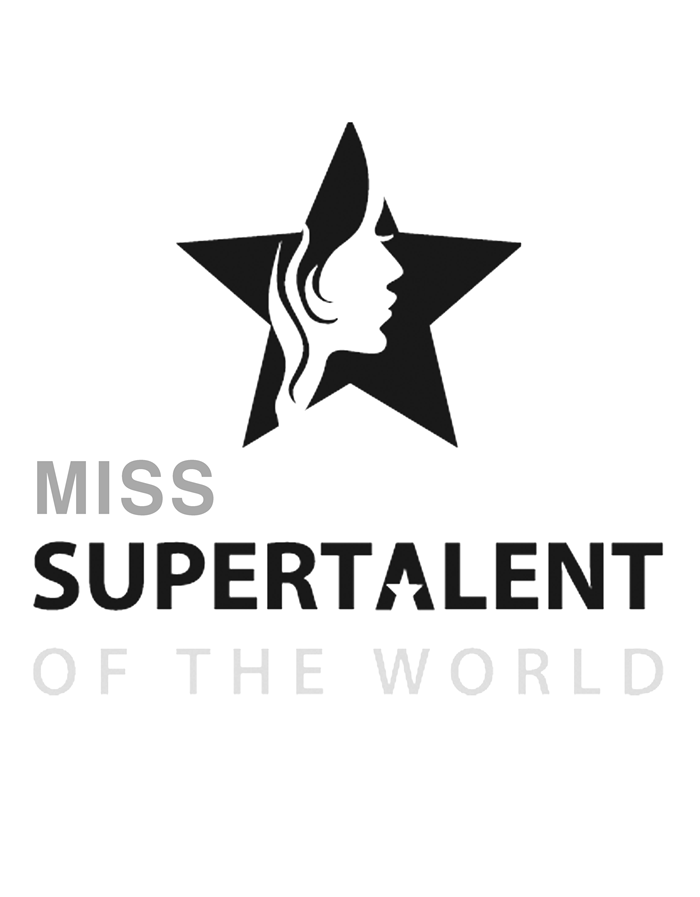
- Formation: 2011; 15 years ago
- Type: Fashion Week, Modeling Competition
- Headquarters: Seoul, Paris
- Location: Worldwide
- President: Lawrence Choi
- Parent organization: Supertalent World Group, Global Fashion Group
- Affiliations: Vancouver Fashion Week
- Website: supertalentworld.com

The Miss Supertalent of the World is a global beauty, modeling, and talent pageant. Founded in 2011 by Lawrence Choi and Thomas Zilliacus (a former Nokia executive), it is managed by the Suta Group (formerly Supertalent World Group) with headquarters in Seoul and Singapore. Unlike traditional pageants, this event blends the standard contest format with high-fashion marketing and entertainment, collaborating closely with top international fashion weeks. It operates in more than 80 countries, having been held in Paris, Milan, Rome, Cannes, Dubai, Abu Dhabi, Ferrari museum, Eiffel Tower Notable past contestants include Chloe Veitch, Rachel Gupta, Meriam George, Milett Figueroa, Anna Lundh, Diana Arno, Maria Sten, Dipna Patel, Malina Joshi and many more.

== GFG at Paris Fashion Week ==
Since 2022, Supertalent, operating under the GFG (Glotbal Fashion Group) banner, has produced its own events during the official Paris Fashion Week (PFW) season. Founded to showcase international designers, it utilizes prestigious Parisian venues like the Salon Gustave Eiffel and Pavillon Cambon Capucines. Paris Fashion Week x GFG serves as a global launchpad for emerging designers and supermodels.. For the FW21 edition, the organization officially contracted Palais Brongniart in Paris as the main venue. However, due to the geopolitical instability caused by the Russia-Ukraine conflict, the event was significantly restructured as international designers and participants faced travel and logistical challenges.

== International Fashion Summit Awards ==
Following its successful global editions, the organization expanded its operations back to South Korea with the launch of the International Fashion Summit Awards. Designed as a large-scale international fashion and modeling platform, the event fuses the organization's competition legacy with global fashion showcases. The platform brings together international supermodels and European designers, aiming to connect the European high-fashion industry with commercial and entertainment opportunities in East Asia. The event culminates in a grand finale designed for an international broadcast audience.

=== Paris Editions ===
Year	Venue	Location	Date	Season
2026	Kimpton St Honoré Paris	Paris, France	28 Sept.	SS27
2025	H4 Wyndham Paris Pleyel	Paris, France	30 Sept.	SS26
2024	The Westin Paris - Vendôme	Paris, France	23 Sept.	SS25
2023	Salle Wagram	Paris, France	27 Feb.	FW23
2022	Pavillon Cambon	Paris, France	27 Sep.	SS23
2021	Palais Brongniart (Contracted)	Paris, France	27 Feb.	Cancelled
2020	Printemps Haussmann	Paris, France	3 Oct.	SS21
2018	Salon Gustave Eiffel Tower	Paris, France	11 Nov.	Special Post-PFW

== Supertalent World Record ==
Supertalent World Organization launched Supertalent World Record, the world's authority on record-breaking achievements to best global performance ever recorded and officially verified in a specific skills and human achievement of entertainment, sports, politician, and fourth industrial entertainment solutions. Psy, Ban Ki-moon, Song Hae, Hong Soo-hwan, Jin Yong, Cho Yong-pil, Park Chan-ho, Lee Seung-yuop, Jang Mi-ran, Cho Yong-pil, Lee Yun-Seo, and others were awarded Supertalent World Records.

== Edition ==
Year	Season	date	Event venue	Host country	Entrants
2026	24	24 Oct	Seoul Gyeongju Jinju Ulsan South Korea	South Korea	38
2025	23	24 Oct.	Vinpearl Landmark 81 Ho Chi Minh City	Vietnam	50
2025	22	23 Feb.	Yangpyeong County Gyeonggi Province	South Korea	50
2024	21	23 Sept.	The Westin Paris – Vendôme Paris	France	70
2024	20	31 Aug	Pyeongchang Alpensia Resort	South Korea	50
2024	19	30 May	Grand Hill Convention Seoul	South Korea	50
2023	18	05 Nov	Asiana Plaza, Ho Chi Minh City	Vietnam	42
2023	17	30 May	Busan Cinema Center, Busan	South Korea	40
2023	16	27 Feb.	Salle Wagram, Paris	France	38
2022	15	27 Sep.	Pavilion Cambon, Paris	France	42
2022	14	26 Mar.	Dubai Festival City	United Arab Emirates	35
2019	13	2 Nov.	Waldorf Astoria Hotels & Resorts, Rome	Italy	45
2019	12	10 May	Seoul Dragon City, Seoul	South Korea	38
2018	11	11 Nov.	Eiffel Tower, Paris	France	33
2018	10	11 May	Songdo Convensia, Incheon	South Korea	38
2017	9	29 Oct.	The K Hotel, Seoul	South Korea	38
2017	8	13 May	Goyang International Flower Festival	South Korea	42
2016	7	3 Dec.	Sheraton Hotels and Resorts, Seoul	South Korea	51
2015	6	13 May	The K Hotel, Seoul	South Korea	98
2014	5	19 Dec.	Sebitseom, Seoul	South Korea	27
2014	4	30 May	Hilton Hotels & Resorts, Seoul	South Korea	41
2013	3	23 Oct.	Hallyuworld, Gyeonggi Province	South Korea	39
2012	2	16 Jun.	Grand Hill Convention, Seoul	South Korea	39
2011	1	15 Oct.	Busan Yachting Center, Busan	South Korea	54

== Titleholders ==
Edition	Season	Winner	1st Runner-Up	2nd Runner-Up	3rd Runner-Up	4th Runner-Up	5th Runner-Up	6th Runner-Up	7th Runner-Up	8th Runner-Up	9th Runner-Up
2025	23	Aimee Leigh Botes; South Africa	Aigual Zaripova; Tatarstan	Laura Majercakova; Slovakia	Vladyslava Lapina; Ukraine	Bella Totrova; Russia	Anindya Prabanari; Indonesia	Sandra Matlak; Poland	Not awarded	Not awarded	Not awarded
2025	22	Barbora Sunavska; Slovakia	Azjargal Amarbayar; Mongolia	Andre Iroova; Slovakia	Chaderia Groover; United States of America	Jaber Chaimaa; Morocco	Hajar Akoubi; Morocco	Michal Yofedov; Israel	Not awarded	Not awarded	Not awarded
2024	21	Paige Loren; United Kingdom	Shiho Kinuno; Japan	Alisa Miškovska; Latvia	Rina Muller; Thailand	Grace Richardson; England	Rachel Julianna; Hungary	Emilie Svendby; Norway	Viktorie Urbanová; Czechia	Katarina Kuzmanov; Serbia	Tatjana Bahadori; Austria
2024	20	Meldra Rosenberg; Germany	Lucy Dimitrova; Sweden	Rabab Fehraoui; Morocco	Heidi Le; Vietnam	Chaimaa Hejam; Morocco	Aliia Abbiasova; Russia	Anna Ramadanovic; Serbia	Tereza Zakova; Czechia	Shiho Kinuno (tied); Japan Kebek Wakshum (tied); Ethiopia	Laurien Polna (tied); Poland Hayley Lee Bradney (tied); Australia
2024	19	Nao Matsumura; Japan	Lea Marzu Backhaus; Germany	Jessica Pliskin; United Kingdom	Nguyễn Thùy; Vietnam	Ako Maihama; Japan	Ariel Yao; China	Lindsay Lauren Becker; USA	Rheanna cartier England	Jan Villanueva; Philippines	Anna Corvino; Thailand
2023	18	Sherby Bagdatovna; Kazakhstan	Amy Sirada; Myanmar	Not awarded	Not awarded	Not awarded	Not awarded	Not awarded	Not awarded	Not awarded	Not awarded
2023	17	Paulina Starosielec; Poland	Iulia Shukan; Russia	Monica Torres Caro; Chile	Not awarded	Not awarded	Not awarded	Not awarded	Not awarded	Not awarded	Not awarded
2023	16	Anna Marie; Czech Republic	Mathilde; France	Beatriz Venâncio; Portugal	Klaudia Kowalczyk; Poland	Liza Gogolauri; Georgia	Loreliwe Durimel; Guadeloupe	Not awarded	Not awarded	Not awarded	Not awarded
2022	15	Rachel Gupta (tied); India Weronika Nowak (tied); Poland	Celest Decaesstecker; Belgium	Anastasija Aleksejevska; Latvia	Rediet Berhanu; Ethiopia	Nansy Sarantou; Greece	Polina Petrovska; Ukraine	Tsholofelo Mathebe; South Africa	Not awarded	Not awarded	Not awarded
2022	14	Alexandra Stroe; Romania	Kianna Stephens; England	Mathilde Remelius; France	Anastasiia Dymchenko; Russia	Victoria Baloyan; Armenia	Karolina Gevorgyan; Spain	Tsonka Tsvetanova; Bulgaria	Karolina Skowerska; Poland	Arina Mardari; Moldova	Violetta Torianyk; Ukraine
2019	13	Myriam Cassim; France	Denisa Koresova; Czech Republic	Ynnaja Silva; Brazil	Unknown; Mexico	Hera Han; South Korea	Unknown; Spain	Unknown; Switzerland	Unknown; Italy	Not awarded	Not awarded
2019	12	Lada Akimova; Russia	Klaudia Kowalowka; England	Denisa Korešová; Czech Republic	Gael Cameron; Australia	Jan; Canada	Barbie Haro; Mexico	Alona; Turkey	Olha Maksimenko; Ukraine	Not awarded	Not awarded
2018	11	Ekaterina Ksenzova; Netherlands	Nika Kar; Slovenia	Acacia Walker; New Zealand	Sofi Baranovskaya; Italy	Not awarded	Not awarded	Not awarded	Not awarded	Not awarded	Not awarded
2018	10	Alexia Navarro; Spain	Simone Heijilgers; Cabo Verde	Ruigi Zhang; Hong Kong	Narmin Safarova; Azerbaijan	Vanessa Fernandes; Brazil	Jekaterina P. Estonia	Holzer Franziska; Germany	Carmen De Pascalis; Italy	Jurate Stasiunaite; Lithuania	Chloe Veitch; United Kingdom
2017	9	Natali Varchenko; Moldova	Colleen; China	Burte; Mongolia	Sornsarot Vittayaruengsook; Thailand	Nikita; Canada	Kintija; Latvia	Yue Li; Taiwan	Not awarded	Not awarded	Not awarded
2017	8	Naomi Mondragon; Mexico	Roksana Oraniec; Poland	Tuuli Koskiaho; Finland	Stacie Meng; China	Nina Goryniuk; Ukraine	Tatiana Zverko; Russia	Tran Luong; Vietnam	Not awarded	Not awarded	Not awarded
2016	7	Paulina Pelyova (tied); Czech Republic Milett Figueroa (tied); Peru	Honey Tian Mi; Macau	Valentina C. Italy	Helmi Palonen; Finland	Imlibenla Wati; India	Josefine Svensson; Sweden	Urachaphat Dechabenjanon; Thailand	Not awarded	Not awarded	Not awarded
2015	6	Natalie Stejskalova; Czech Republic	Amarsanaa Saikhantamir; Mongolia	Anzhelika Tahir; Pakistan	Iris Hertroijs; Netherlands	Chloe Murphy; United Kingdom	Cherise Lai; Singapore	Amy Botansky; Australia	Not awarded	Not awarded	Not awarded
2014	5	Swetha Raj; India	Safina Barsatie; Netherlands	Azbileg Enkhbor; Mongolia	Lilia Ishmuratova; Russia	Shawne Zhang; China	Anukriti Kusen; Sweden	Mayuka; Japan	Not awarded	Not awarded	Not awarded
2014	4	May Myat Noe (dethroned); Myanmar	Kim Eea; South Korea	Hio Man Cha; Macau	Hillarie Danielle Ang Parungao; Philippines	Anukriti Gusain; India	Poojaa Kaur Gill; Singapore	Nisanat Mongsai; Thailand	Not awarded	Not awarded	Not awarded
2013	3	Srishti Rana; India	Meriam George; Egypt	Yevgeniya Klishina; Kazakhstan	Yekaterina Grushanina; Russia	Moa Madicken Öberg; Sweden	Battulga Bilguunzaya; Mongolia	La Toyah Asha James; Australia	Not awarded	Not awarded	Not awarded
2012	2	Himangini Singh Yadu; India	Tuyamaa Tumenjargal; Mongolia	Diana Kubasova; Latvia	Katerina Shevchenko; Ukraine	Chawanluck Unger; Thailand	Nathaly Farraj; Lebanon	Alena Senatorova; Germany	Janice Rivera; Puerto Rico	Not awarded	Not awarded
2011	1	Jung Eun A (resigned); South Korea Florima Treiber (dethroned); France Diana Starkova (assumed); Ukraine	Anna Botova; Russia	Alesssandra Usman; Indonesia	Tanvi Singla; India	Golnaz Harandi; Canada	Park Sae Byul; Korea	Not awarded	Not awarded	Not awarded	Not awarded

Notes
1. ^{a} assumed
2. ^{b} dethroned

== See also ==
- List of beauty contests
