= Kim Hyo-jin (model) =

South Korean model (born 1982)

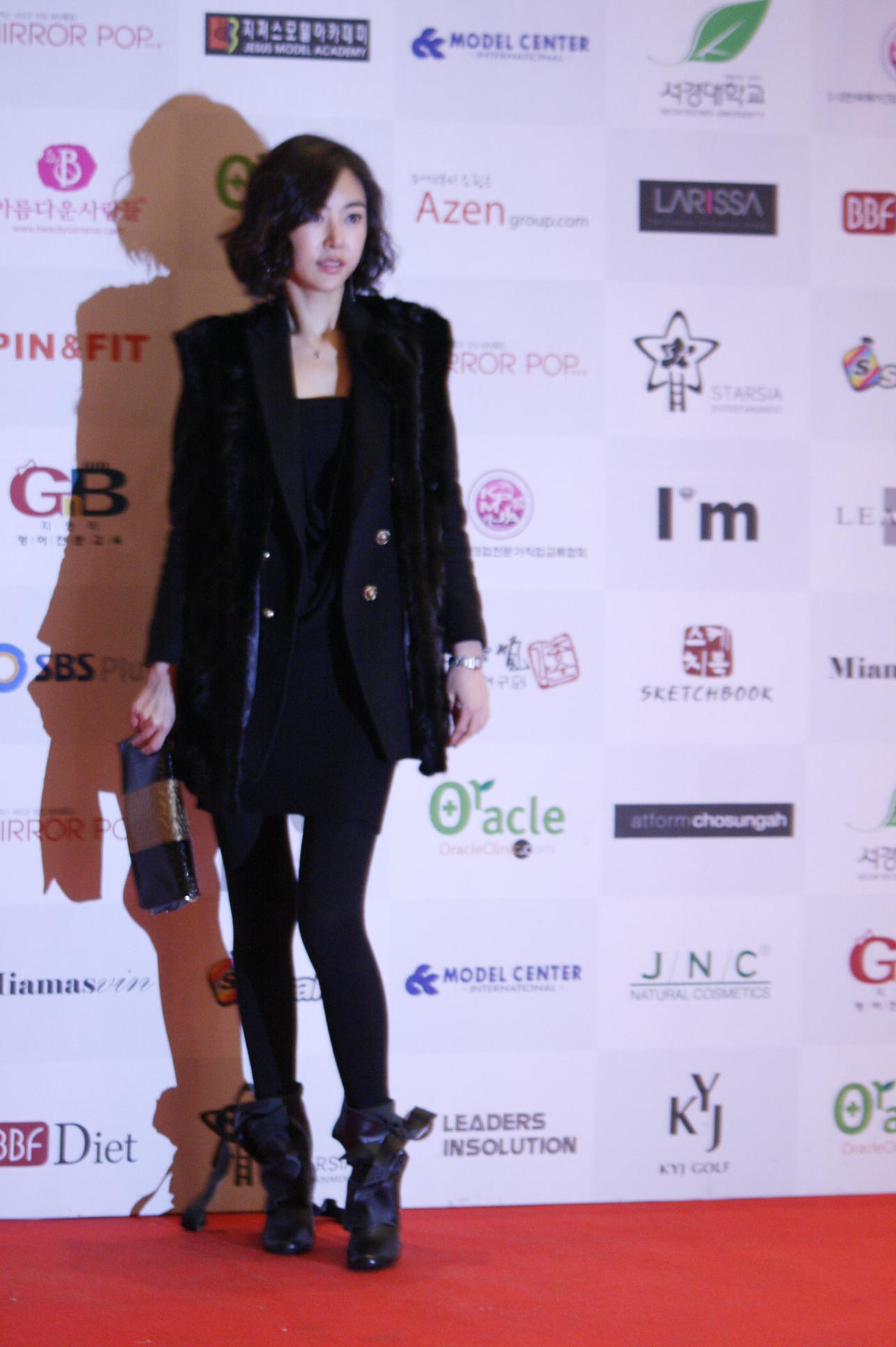
- Born: 22 September 1982 (age 44); Seoul, South Korea
- Other name: Jin-hee
- Years active: 2000–present
- Modeling information
- Height: 1.76 m (5 ft 9 1/2 in)
- Hair color: Black
- Eye color: Dark brown
- Agency: Suta Group (Seoul)

Korean name
- Hangul: 김효진
- RR: Gim Hyojin
- MR: Kim Hyojin

Kim Hyo-jin (Korean: 김효진; born 22 September 1982), commonly known as Jin Hee, is a South Korean model who won Seoul Broadcasting System's Supermodel of the Korea title in 2000 at the age of 20.

== Career ==
=== Model ===
Kim Hyo-jin signed to Ford Models, an American international modeling agency based in New York City and made her New York Fashion Week, Paris Fashion Week, Milan Fashion Week and returned to Seoul and has shot models for various brands including LG Household & Health Care, Daewoo Motors and SK-II

In August 2019, Kim Hyo-jin signed a contract with SUTA GROUP

=== TV show host ===
Kim Hyo-jon was featured in Chosun Broadcasting Company, J Golf Queens Cup, Seoul Broadcasting System's Golf, Grand Sports Adventure.

In October 2019, Kim Hyo-jin will be hosted Miss Supertalent of the World Season 13 from Paris to Rome
