= Kim Hyo-jin (disambiguation) =

Kim Hyo-jin (born 1984) is a South Korean actress.

Other notable people with the same name include:

- Kim Hyo-jin (footballer) (born 1990), South Korean footballer
- Kim Hyo-jin (model) (born 1982), South Korean model
- JeA (real name Kim Hyo-jin, born 1981), South Korean singer and member of Brown Eyed Girls
- Kim Hyo-jin (born 1994), South Korean singer, member of ONF
