= Shilpa Singh =

Indian beauty pageant winner

- Born: Shilpa Singh; February 27, 1989 (age 37); Samastipur, Bihar, India
- Education: Mukesh Patel School of Technology Management & Engineering, Mumbai
- Height: 1.70 m (5 ft 7 in)
- Beauty pageant titleholder
- Title: I Am She – Miss Universe India 2012
- Hair color: Black
- Eye color: Black
- Major competitions: I AM She 2012 (Winner); Miss Universe 2012 (Top 16)

Shilpa Singh is an Indian singer, dancer, model and beauty pageant titleholder. She was the runner-up at I AM She – Miss Universe India 2012. She represented India at the Miss Universe 2012 pageant at Las Vegas and became one of the semi-finalist after topping the interview preliminary competition with a score of 9.6/10.

== Professional life ==
Shilpa Singh graduated from the Indian School of Business in 2019 and currently works with Google. She had earlier completed her B.Tech. in computer science from (SVKM's NMIMS), Mumbai.

In October 2012, Singh replaced Urvashi Rautela, the original winner of I Am She 2012, who was found to be too young to compete.

Awards and achievements
Preceded by Vasuki Sunkavalli	I AM She; 2012	Succeeded by Manasi Moghe
