= Anna Botova =

Russian singer (born 1987)

- Born: 25 March 1987 (age 39); Astrakhan, Astrakhan Oblast, USSR
- Education: Peoples' Friendship University of Russia
- Occupations: Model, Singer
- Known for: Miss Globe International 2010 (1st runner-up)
- Website: www.anna-botova.ru

Anna Botova (born March 25, 1987) is a Russian model, singer who was crowned as the 1st runner-up at Miss Globe International 2010 and Miss Asia Pacific World 2011.

== Early life and education ==
Born in Astrakhan, Russia, Botova grew up under the tutelage of her grandmother who enrolled her in a music school. She graduated from the Peoples' Friendship University of Russia with a degree in law.

== Career ==
Botova began a career in music in her early childhood. She became a soloist for a music group known as "Genuch DI7". Botova started touring across Russia performing as a model and singer at various occasions. She obtained a modeling contract in Paris and eventually became the face of a Parisian boutique. She later returned to Russia and worked for the biggest Russian modeling agency. She participated and won prizes in various beauty pageant contests held across Russia.

== Awards and honors ==
- Miss People's Choice Award (Miss Astrakhan region 2003)
- Miss LG 2005 (1st place)
- Best Astrakhan podium Model 2006 (2nd place)
- Miss Astrakhan region in 2007 (1st place)
- Miss Volga 2008 (1st Vice-Miss)
- Miss Beauty & Miss Global Beauty Queen International 2009 (1st runner-up)
- Miss Runet 2010 (1st place)
- Miss Bikini International 2010 (1st Lady Winter)
- Miss Globe International 2010 (1st runner-up)
- Miss Asia Pacific World 2011 (1st runner-up)

== Personal life ==
Botova lives in Moscow.
