= Milett Figueroa =

Peruvian model and actress

Maria Milett Figueroa
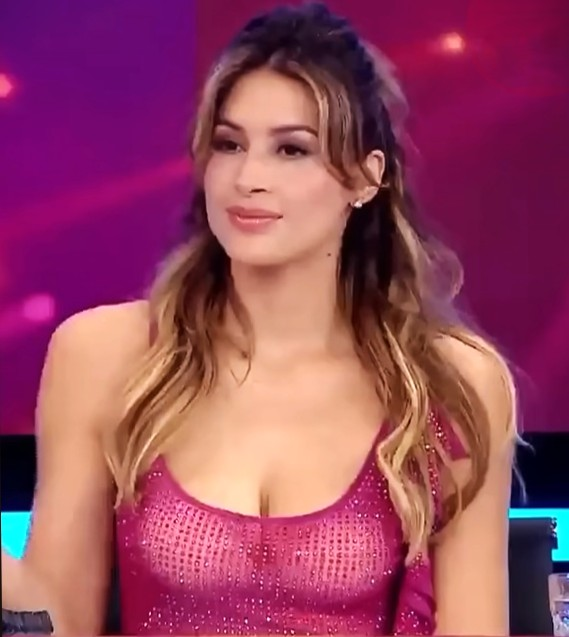
- Figueroa in 2024
- Born: Maria Milett Figueroa Valcárcel; 10 June 1992 (age 34); Lima, Peru
- Occupations: Television actress; Movie actress; Model
- Height: 1.78 m (5 ft 10 in)
- Beauty pageant titleholder
- Title: Miss Supertalent 2016
- Agency: Suta Group; El Gran Show
- Years active: 2008-present
- Hair color: Brown
- Eye color: Brown

Maria Milett Figueroa (born June 10, 1992) born Maria Milett Figueroa Valcárcel is a multitalented Peruvian artist, model, celebrity participant on famous talent shows such as El Gran Show, which was produced and filmed in Peru, and Bailando 2023 hosted by Marcelo Tinelli which was produced and filmed in Argentina and also known as a beauty pageant titleholder after being crowned as Miss Supertalent 2016 in Seoul, South Korea on the 3rd of December 2016, also setting the record as the very first Miss Supertalent winner from Peru.

== Pageantry ==
=== Early life ===
Milett Figueroa was born on June 10, 1992, in Arequipa, Peru, famously known as the peruvian "White City". Her parents are Martha Valcarcel, a known soprano performer and Juan Carlos Figueroa. Her ancestry includes Peruvian and Italian. Figueroa has three siblings Maia Figueroa, Helmuth Linder and Juan Miguel Figueroa Figueroa's cousin is television actress and media producer Giovanna Valcarcel

=== Personal life ===
Milett dated the famous Argentinian media producer and businessman Marcello Tinelli, with whom she started a romantic relationship, right after moving from her home in Lima, Peru to Buenos Aires, Argentina to participate as a Peruvian guest at a famous Argentine night time show titled "Bailando 2023" where Tinelli was working as both the host and producer of the show. Soon after meeting up and initiating a relationship, almost immediately, both became one of the most talked about power-couples on the press in countries like Argentina, Peru and neighbouring countries where the news of the famous "it couple" managed to captivate and brew a massive amount of fans together due to both Tinelli and Figueroa being prominent figures in the argentinian, peruvian, uruguayan, spanish and italian diaspora. Three years later, it is Milett Figueroa who confirms the end of her relationship with Marcello Tinelli, which took place by the end of March 2026 and was, later, confirmed by Tinelli.

=== Miss Supertalent 2017 ===
In November 2016, she traveled to Seoul, South Korea, to represent her country as "Miss Peru" at the Miss Supertalent pageant and won the title of Miss Supertalent 2016<ref"Milett Figueroa se corona Miss Supertalent of the World 2016". Grupo RPP. 3 December 2016.</ref>
