= Yuuzoo =

YuuZoo Corporation Ltd.
- Type: Public
- Traded as: SGX: AFC
- Industry: E-commerce
- Founded: 2008
- Founder: Thomas Zilliacus; Ron Creevey
- Headquarters: Singapore
- Key people: Thomas Zilliacus (Executive Chairman)
- Subsidiaries: YuuPay Secure Pte Ltd
- Website: www.yuuzoo.com

YuuZoo was a company that has built an online platform that combines social networking, e-commerce, gaming and online and mobile payments. It had grown internationally through a licensing programme in which geographical licenses were sold to companies or entrepreneurs in each market. It was the first company of its kind to be listed in Singapore. The platform also had an advertising functionalities and a payment service called YuuPay.

== History ==
YuuZoo was founded in 2008 by Ron Creevey and Thomas Henrik Zilliacus, the former Regional Director for Asia Pacific of Nokia. Building of his 14-year experience as a senior executive in the world's leading mobile phone company Nokia, Thomas Zilliacus from the time YuuZoo was founded used leading audit and legal firms to ensure that YuuZoo from a corporate governance point of view was prepared for a possible listing. He engaged KPMG, one of the world's big 4 audit firms, to advise Yuuzoo on how it should recognise the sale of licenses against shares in the companies that bought the licenses. Following the advice of KPMG, YuuZoo appointed Deloitte, another big 4 audit firm, to value the shares YuuZoo received. The model was presented to the Singapore Stock Exchange (SGX) who approved it. On September 16, 2014, YuuZoo became a listed company on the SGX under the ticker symbol "AFC".

YuuZoo set up an office in Singapore, and also set up offices in Thailand, China and Nigeria. Soon after the listing Thomas Zilliacus resigned as CEO and James Sundram was appointed. From October 2015 Sundram was in charge of all operational matters while Thomas Zilliacus as Chairman focused on strategic issues.

In 2017, YuuZoo made a major acquisition in buying a French logistics company. The plan was to build a European base for YuuZoo's e-commerce business and to provide logistics services in Europe for Asian e-commerce companies. The French company was named YuuLog.

=== 2018-2019: Trading halt and office closures ===
In March 2018, SGX, which had approved YuuZoo's revenue recognition model before the company was listed, without explanation reversed course and suspended the trading in the shares of YuuZoo claiming that the revenue recognition model they themselves had approved may have misled investors. SGX also asked the Singapore Commercial Affairs Department (CAD) to start an investigation into the matter. An investigation that has continued for over 3 years has shown no breaches by YuuZoo of any SGX rules or regulations nor anything wrong with the revenue recognition model. In spite of this, SGX has refused to lift the trading suspension. This led to Yuuzoo having to close all its operations including its newly acquired YuuLog business in France and its offices in Singapore, Thailand, China and Nigeria. It also has had to terminate more than 300 employees as it has been unable to access its funds due to the ongoing trading suspension.
