= I Am She–Miss Universe India =

National beauty pageant from 2010 to 2012

I AM She
- Logo
- Predecessor: Femina Miss India
- Successor: Miss Diva
- Formation: 2010
- Dissolved: 2012
- Type: Beauty Pageant
- Headquarters: Mumbai
- Location: India
- Members: Miss Universe (2010 - 2012); Miss Globe International (2011); Miss Asia Pacific World (2011 - 2012)
- President: Sushmita Sen
- Website: http://www.iam-she.com/v2/

I AM She – Miss Universe India was a national beauty pageant in India that used to send its winner to Miss Universe pageant from 2010 to 2012.

== History ==
In 2010, Femina Miss India relinquished its exclusive right to send the representative to Miss Universe, and Tantra Entertainment Private limited, in collaboration with former Miss Universe and Bollywood actress Sushmita Sen, organized the pageant in the same year.

After the 2012 Miss Universe Pageant, Sushmita Sen and Tantra entertainment announced they would be relinquishing the license for Miss Universe, but have not officially stated whether "I Am She" will continue to be held.

I AM She – Miss Universe India, sent the contestants to Miss Universe from year 2010 to 2012.

In 2013, Femina Miss India was awarded the franchise back after I AM She – Miss Universe India concluded their contract with the Miss Universe Organization. A separate pageant Miss Diva is held to send delegates from 2013 onwards.

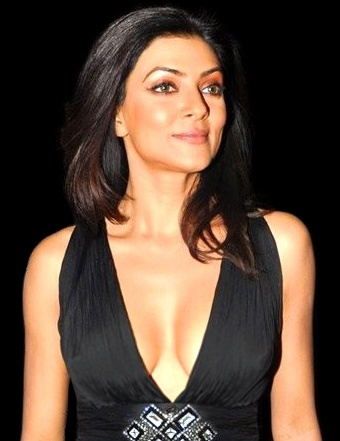
Sushmita Sen, the organizer of I Am She – Miss Universe India.

== Editions ==
=== I AM She 2010 ===
The first ever I AM She - Miss Universe India pageant was held on May 28 hosted by Rahul Khanna and former Femina Miss India (Miss India Universe), Neha Dhupia and was co-hosted by Ayushmann Khurrana.

The reigning Miss Universe, Stefania Fernandez crowned the very first I AM She - Miss Universe India, Ushoshi Sengupta.

30 contestants from different parts of the country participated. After the 1st round, the top 20 contestants were announced and in the next round, the top 10 contestants. Later, from the top 5 contestants, Miss Ushoshi Sengupta emerged as the eventual winner.

=== I AM She 2011 ===
The second edition of I AM She - Miss Universe India pageant was held on 15 July 2011 in Mumbai. The winner represented India in Miss Universe 2011 held in São Paulo, Brazil.

20 contestants from different parts of the country participated. In the preliminary the contestants went through swimsuits, evening gowns and preliminary interviews. In final after the 1st round, the top 10 were announced. Later, the top five were chosen and after the Q&A round the winner was announced

Many famous personalities from social, cultural and film fields such as Zayed Khan, Miss Asia Pacific 2000, Dia Mirza and Esha Deol attended the show.

I AM She - Miss Universe India 2010, Ushoshi Sengupta crowned Vasuki Sunkavalli of Hyderabad as I AM She - Miss Universe India 2011 at the end of the event. The pageant was telecasted on 28 August at 7pm on Star World when Vasuki Sunkavalli was crowned I AM She - Miss Universe India 2011 by her predecessor, Ushoshi Sengupta. Parul Duggal was crowned as the Miss India Globe International 2011 by I AM She 2010 - First Runner up, Reha Sukheja, whereas Tanvi Singla was crowned as Miss India Asia Pacific World 2011 by I AM She 2010 - Second Runner up, Pooja Hegde.

Parul Duggal went on to become the First Runner up at the Miss Global International 2011 in North Cyprus while Tanvi Singla went on to place fifth in Miss Asia Pacific World 2011 in Korea. Whereas Vasuki Sunkavalli remained unplaced at the Miss Universe 2011 held in São Paulo, Brazil.

=== I AM She 2012 ===
The third edition for the pageant I AM She - Miss Universe was held on September 21, 2012. The finale took place in grand convention hall LICEC. Miss Universe 1994, Sushmita Sen along with Miss Asia Pacific World 2012, Himangini Singh Yadu crowned Urvashi Rautela as the new I AM She - Miss Universe India 2012 at the end of the event.

There were 20 contestants who were selected as semifinalists. The field was narrowed down to 10 and ultimately to 5.

Urvashi Rautela was to represent India at Miss Universe 2012. However, due to contradicting contracts with her being Miss Tourism Queen of the Year International and also her not being able to meet up with the age requirements of the Miss Universe Organisation as of 16 October 2012 she resigned her title. First Runner up, Shilpa Singh was crowned the new I AM She - Miss Universe India 2012.

== Titleholders ==
Year	Miss Universe India	Runners Up				Ref.
Year	Miss Universe India	1st Runner Up	2nd Runner Up	3rd Runner Up	4th Runner Up	Ref.
2010	Ushoshi Sengupta (Kolkata)	Reha Sukheja (Hyderabad)	Pooja Hegde (Mumbai)	Shruti Iyer (Mumbai)	Shilpa Tripathi (Pune)	
2011	Vasuki Sunkavalli (Hyderabad)	Parul Duggal (Chandigarh)	Tanvi Singla (Bangalore)	Priyanka Misal	Kiran Thapar (Goa)	
2012	Urvashi Rautela (Uttarakhand)	Shilpa Singh (Bihar)	Arlette Evita Grao (Maharashtra)	Dipna Patel (Gujarat)	Aneesha Chowdary	
2012	Shilpa Singh (Bihar)	Arlette Evita Grao (Maharashtra)	Dipna Patel (Gujarat)	Aneesha Chowdary	—N/a	

=== Miss Universe ===
Year	Official Representative Miss Universe India	Hometown	Competition Performance		Ref.
Year	Official Representative Miss Universe India	Hometown	Placements	Other Award(s)	Ref.
2010	Ushoshi Sengupta	Kolkata	Unplaced	—	
2011	Vasuki Sunkavalli	Hyderabad	Unplaced	—	
2012	Shilpa Singh	Bihar	Top 16	—	

=== Miss Globe International ===
Year	Official Representative Miss Globe International India	Hometown	Competition Performance		Ref.
Year	Official Representative Miss Globe International India	Hometown	Placements	Other Award(s)	Ref.
2011	Parul Duggal	Chandigarh	1st Runner Up	—	

=== Miss Asia Pacific World ===
Year	Official Representative Miss Asia Pacific World India	Hometown	Competition Performance		Ref.
Year	Official Representative Miss Asia Pacific World India	Hometown	Placements	Other Award(s)	Ref.
2011	Tanvi Singla	Bangalore	3rd Runner Up	—	
2012	Himangini Singh Yadu	Indore	Miss Asia Pacific World	1st Runner Up for Best Evening Gown	

== Winners gallery ==
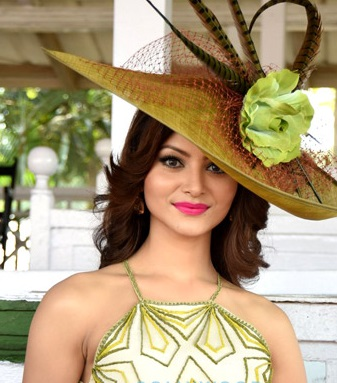
I AM She - Miss Universe India 2012 (Dethroned)
Urvashi Rautela
Kotdwar

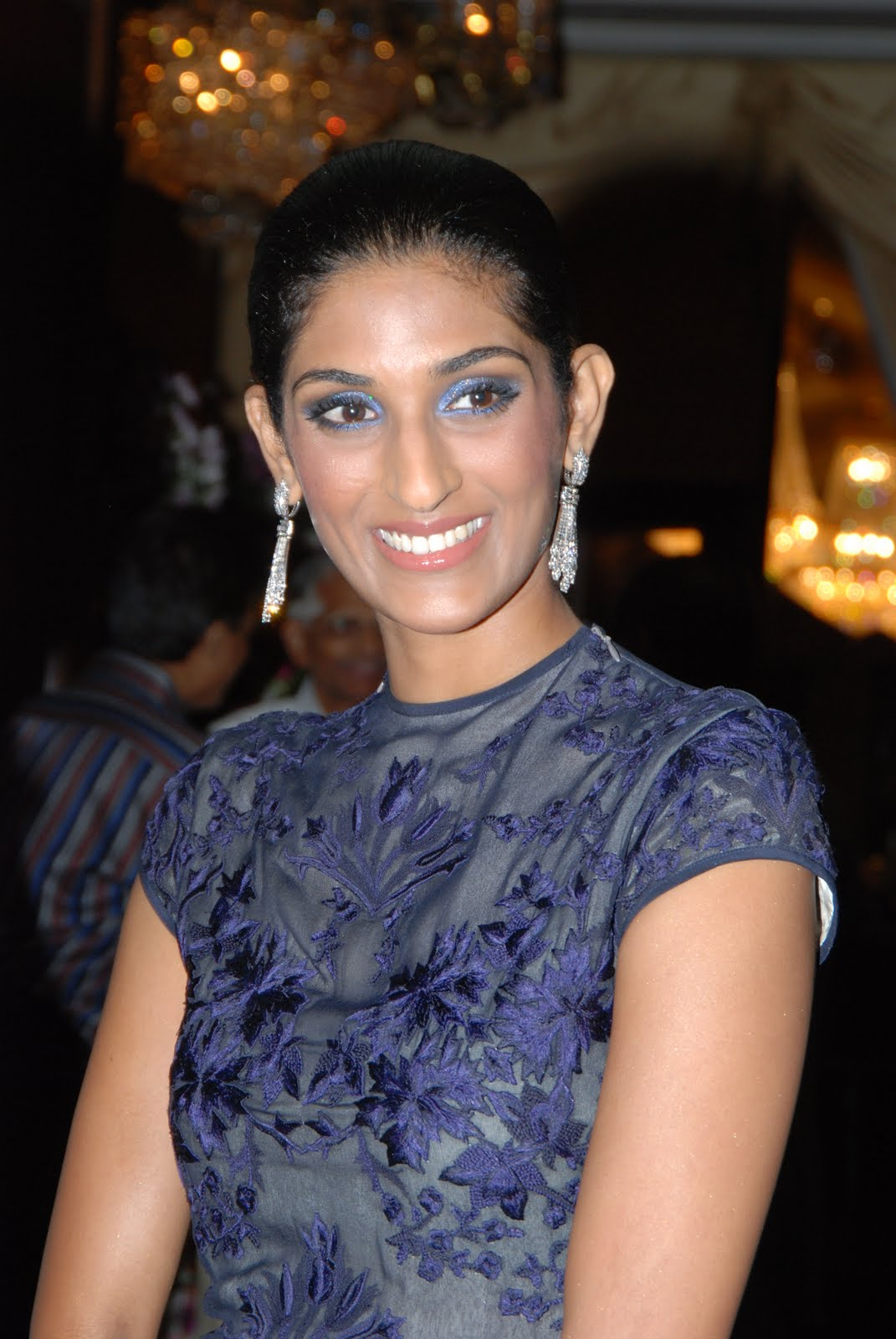
I AM She - Miss Universe India 2011
Vasuki Sunkavalli
Hyderabad

== See also ==
- Miss Universe
- Sushmita Sen
