= Miss All Nations =

International beauty pageant

- Abbreviation: MAN
- Formation: 1989; 37 years ago
- Founded at: China
- Purpose: Beauty pageant
- Headquarters: Nanjing
- Location: China
- Official language: English
- President: Charlie See

Miss All Nations (also known as "全球生态旅游美丽盛会颁奖盛典") is an international beauty pageant that has been held irregularly since 1989.

== History ==
The pageant was created by Charlie See in 1989. The competition focuses not only on beauty, but on the contestants dedication to courage and on the contestants passion to make a difference. The purpose of the competition is to give women of the world an opportunity to come together and build relationships with other women who want to make an impact in their communities. The competition also tries to promote ecotourism and environmental awareness. The competition was first held in Bangkok, Thailand. The pageant began with controversy as Kristen Roberts of New Zealand was the first winner and was dethroned soon after for behavior reasons and for failing to complete post-contest obligations. A second edition of Miss All Nations was held in 1990 in Kuala Lumpur, Malaysia.

The pageant was not held again until 2010, when it was revived by Alex Liu. Diāna Kubasova of Latvia was the winner and the contest was held in Nanjing, China. The event has since taken place in 2011, 2012, 2014, 2015, 2016, 2017 and 2019.

== Titleholders ==
Year	Country	Winner	Location	Participants
1989	New Zealand	Kirsten Roberts	Bangkok, Thailand	27
1990	Belgium	An Balduck	Kuala Lumpur, Malaysia	32
2010	Latvia	Diana Kubasova	Nanjing, China	56
2011	Romania	Cristina-Elena David	Nanjing, China	41
2012	Belarus	Darla Patkova	Nanjing, China	43
2014	Bolivia	Nayell Quiroga Via	Nanjing, China	36
2015	Mexico	Maria Fernanda Valenzuela Gaxiola	Nanjing, China	36
2016	Latvia	Laura Skutana	Nanjing, China	40
2017	Thailand	Poowisa Chawang	Nanjing, China	25
2019	Russia	Taliya Aybedullina	Nanjing, China	24

== See also ==
- List of beauty pageants
