= Eyeluminati =

Eyeluminati is a technology company based in Washington DC which developed from a project led by Roopam Sharma and Neeraj Saini. They entered for the Microsoft Imagine Cup 2015 and won the innovation category with the Manovue project. This is an intelligent personal assistant in the form of a glove for the visually impaired which reads printed or digital text aloud. It also helps people to move around and to use computer technology. It went on to win the World Health Summit Startup Award 2018. They also won the Cognitive Computing & Internet of Things in the fourth season of Yahoo Accenture Innovation Jockeys in 2015.

It has been suggested that the Manovue eliminates the need for Braille. It combines vision intelligence and the internet of things.
