= Diana Kubasova =

Latvian model and beauty pageant titleholder

- Born: Diana Kubasova; 20 August 1989 (age 36); Riga, Latvian SSR (now Latvia)
- Citizenship: Latvian
- Title: Miss Europe 2017
- Modeling information
- Height: 177 cm (5 ft 10 in)
- Hair color: Brown
- Eye color: Green
- Website: http://dianakubasova.com/

Diana Kubasova is Latvian model and beauty pageant titleholder, who won Miss Multiverse 2018, Miss Europe 2017 and Miss All Nations 2010. She was first runner-up at Miss Bikini International 2010 and second runner-up at Miss Supertalent of the World 2012.

Diana was named Sexiest Woman Alive 2013 by the influential beauty pageant news portal Global Beauties. She was chosen among the 400 beauties who competed in the five Grand Slam pageants (Miss World, Miss Universe, Miss Supranational, Miss International and Miss Tourism Queen) in 2013. She also has been named several times by the FHM magazine in Latvia as one of the 100 Sexiest Women In The World. She has worked with international brands like Guess, Maison Margiela, Zadig & Voltaire, Jaeger Lecoultre, Adidas, Armine, Galvanni etc. Her passion is languages and she speaks seven. She also studied in Stockholm School of Economics, one of the best universities in Europe, where she received a BSc degree in Financial Economics and Business.

== Miss Europe 2017 ==
Diana Kubasova won Miss Europe 2017 on May 13, 2017. On 24–26 May 2017 she became a special guest of the Cannes Film Festival. On November 10, 2018, she crowned the new winners from Russia and Ukraine who shared the 2018 Miss Europe title.
