= Modern Vidya Niketan schools =

- School Emblem

Location
- Faridabad, Haryana; India; 28.4211°N 77.3078°E

Information
- Type: Private
- Established: 1983; 43 years ago
- Founder: Shri Gopal Sharma
- School board: Central Board of Secondary Education
- Director: Dr. Rakesh Sharma
- Faculty: Abhishek Pandey
- Website: www.mvneducation.com

Modern Vidya Niketan (MVN) Schools are located in the Faridabad, National Capital Region (NCR) of India. Modern Vidya Niketan has been categorised under English medium school. The schools are affiliated to Central Board of Secondary Education (CBSE), Delhi.

== History ==
The first school was established in the year 1983 under the Societies Registration Act XXI of 1960 by Shri Gopal Sharma and Mrs. Kanta Sharma.

In 2009, the Sector 17 school produced the IIT-JEE topper. This feat was repeated by another MVN student, in 2012. In 2008–09, 140 students from the school got admitted to IITs, the highest number from any single institution in India. Srishti Rana, winner of Miss Asia Pacific World, is an alumnus.

=== Branches ===
1. Modern Vidya Niketan, Sector 17, Faridabad
2. Modern Vidya Niketan, aravali hills, Faridabad
3. Modern Vidya Niketan, Palwal
4. Modern Vidya Niketan, Sector 88, Faridabad

== See also ==
- Education in India
- Literacy in India
- List of institutions of higher education in Haryana
