= Miss Europe 2016 =

International beauty pageant

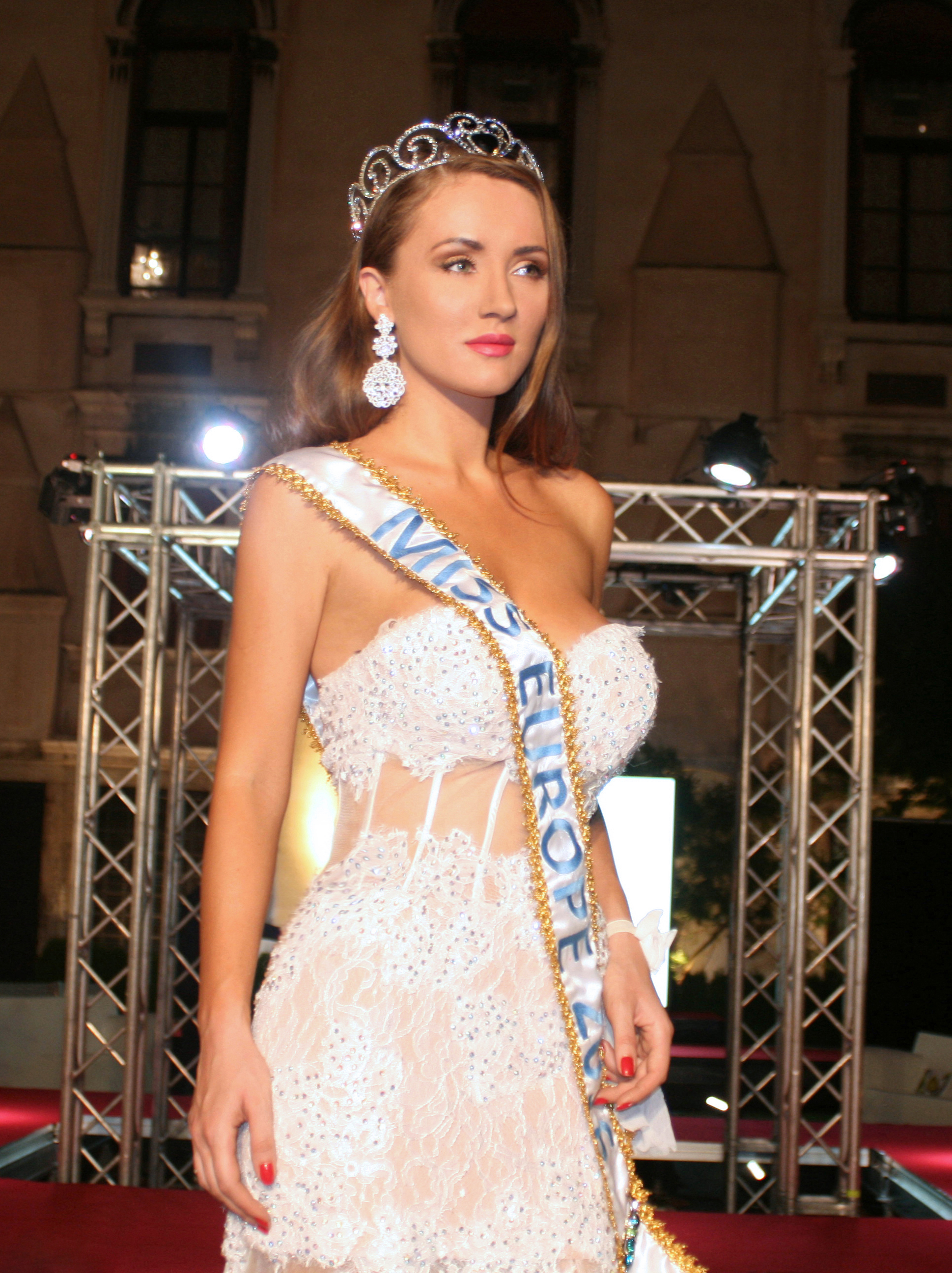
- Miss Europe 2016 Diana Starkova
- Date: 2016
- Venue: Beirut, Lebanon
- Entrants: 30
- Winner: Diana Starkova; France

Diana Starkova (Miss France) was crowned as Miss Europe 2016 during an event with more than 30 national winners from different countries. This was the 59th edition of the Miss Europe pageant and the first edition under the newly formed Miss Europe Organization. The winner was crowned with a tiara made by Chopard which is set with 678 diamonds mounted on 130 grams of gold and estimated 350,000 EUR. With the title Starkova received a modelling contract and professional representation by the Miss Europe Organization, a diamond jewelry set matching to the crown and a watch by Chopard, an alleged cash prize of 650,000 EUR and other prizes.

== Results ==
=== Placements ===
Placement	Contestant
Miss Europe 2016	France – Diana Starkova
1st Runner-Up	Germany – Sabina Michelle Schneider
2nd Runner-Up	Latvia – Yuliya Parkhomenko
