= May Myat Noe =

Burmese model

- မေမြတ်နိုး
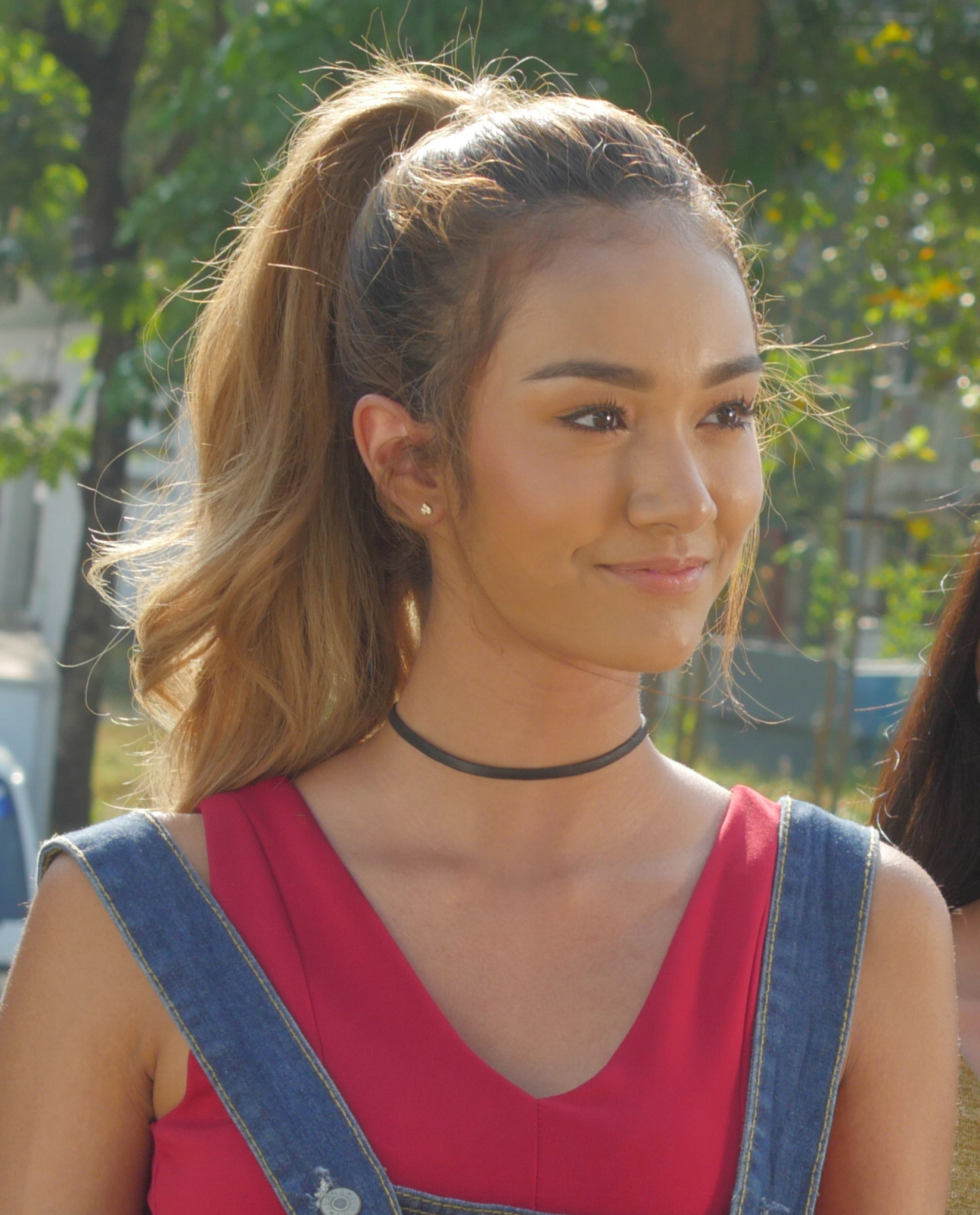
- Born: 13 October 1998 (age 27); Yangon, Myanmar
- Occupations: Model, Actor, beauty queen
- Years active: 2014–present
- Parent: San San Htwe
- Modeling information
- Height: 1.74 m (5 ft 8 1/2 in)
- Hair color: Black
- Eye color: Brown
- Agency: Basic models Singapore

May Myat Noe aka That Htet Aung (Burmese: မေမြတ်နိုး / သက်ထက်အောင်; on 13 October 1998) is a Burmese actress, fashion model and beauty pageant title holder. She is best known for winning Miss Asia Pacific World in 2014, as well as being a finalist in the fourth season of Asia's Next Top Model in 2016. She was featured as the cover girl for the Hello Magazine Wedding first edition.

== Early life and education ==
May Myat Noe aka That Htet Aung was born on 13 October 1998, in Yangon, Myanmar. She attended primary and secondary school in Singapore and finished her high school at Myanmar International School. Her family moved to Singapore from Yangon where she attended Punggol Primary School and CHIJ Saint Nicholas Girls' School. When she came back to Myanmar, she competed in Eai Mat Sone Yar, a televised singing competition. Then, with an invitation from the Style Plus H Organisation, she competed in Miss Asia Pacific World 2014.

== Pageantry ==
=== Miss Asia Pacific World 2014 ===
In 2014, Noe participated in the 2014 edition of Miss Asia Pacific World, where she was crowned as the winner. She was subsequently stripped of the title three months after her win, under allegations by the South Korean pageant organizers that she displayed an "ungrateful attitude and untrustworthiness" by being rude and not returning phone calls.

Noe claimed that the organizers pressured her to undergo extensive plastic surgery, and criticized the organization for its poor reputation. She further stated that she was coaxed to provide escort services for South Korean tycoons. Noe handed the crown, valued at $100,000, over to Burmese authorities in Myanmar, but refused to have the crown returned to South Korea until she received a formal apology.

== Career ==
=== Modeling career ===
Noe was selected as one of fourteen finalists for the fourth season of Asia's Next Top Model in 2016, becoming the first representative from Myanmar to participate in the series. Noe went on to win an all-expenses paid trip to New York Fashion Week sponsored by Maybelline for having garnered the best performance following a photo shoot for the brand during the show's fifth episode. She was eventually eliminated during the show's seventh episode, becoming the eighth eliminated over. After the show, she currently represent by Basic Models in Singapore. She was the face of CLEAR Myanmar and has done several campaigns for L'Oréal, Pocari Sweats, Maybelline and Pepsi.

=== Music career ===
Noe began her music career in 2011, before winning Miss Asia Pacific World 2014. She competed in the sixth season of Eain Met Sone Yar, became the seventh runner-up. She subsequently released multiple singles and music videos, like "Single is the best", "Tagal Ma Chit Yin" and "Oh Boy".

=== Acting career ===
Noe started her acting career in 2014. She made her acting debut with the multiple Burmese movies and videos namely "Ti Kyat", "Pawa Ma Shu Yay Ma Ku Kyay", "Professor Dr.Seik Phwar", "Charm Series", "Motor and Fan", "Achit Pincin Essay", "Palat Kywat Thwar Tat Achit", "A Phyu Htal Lu Mike Gyi", "Akhar Taw" and "Khyay Kyi Tal".

Noe is set to co-star with Johnny Strong in the upcoming American film Invincible, to be directed by Daniel Zirilli.

Her latest projects are, ‘SPIRIT OF FIGHT Season 1’ that was aired in March 2019. Her major film that are going to be in theatres in 2020 are ‘25%’, ‘DIARY’ and YURI- The Film.

== Political activities ==
Following the 2021 Myanmar coup d'état, May Myat Noe was active in the anti-coup movement through social media. She has taken part in the "We Want Justice" three-finger salute movement. The movement was launched on social media, and many popular celebrities joined the movement.

On 4 April 2021, warrants for her arrest were issued under section 505 (a) of the Myanmar Penal Code by the State Administration Council for speaking out against the military coup. Along with several other celebrities, she was charged with calling for participation in the Civil Disobedience Movement (CDM) and damaging the state's ability to govern, with supporting the Committee Representing Pyidaungsu Hluttaw, and with generally inciting the people to disturb the peace and stability of the nation.

== Filmography ==
=== Film ===
Year	Title	Role	Notes	With
2018	Tae Kyat	May Mya	Middle female role	Nay Toe
2018	Invincible	Michelle	Main female role	Johnny Strong
2019	Kyay Kyi Tal'	–	supporting actress	Myint Myat
