= Diana Arno =

Estonian model

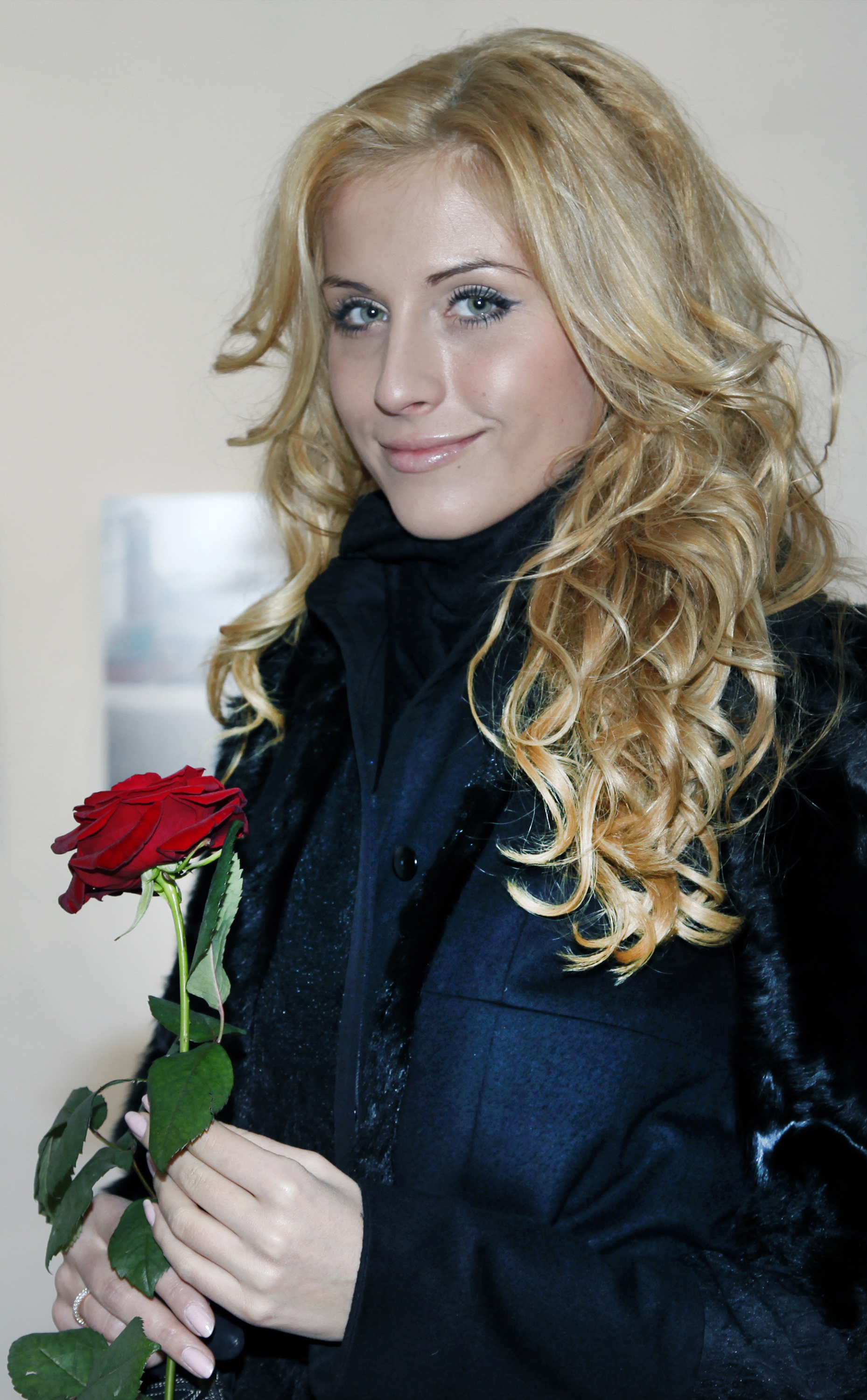
Diana Arno (2009)

Diana Arno (born 29 January 1984) is an Estonian fashion designer, model and beauty pageant titleholder who won the title of Miss Tallinn 2009 and 2010 and Miss Estonia 2009 and 2010, and represented her country at the Miss Universe 2009 pageant.

Arno was born in Tallinn and holds a Bachelor's and MBA degree. She speaks Estonian, English and Russian. After winning Miss Estonia 2009 and 2010, she started her career as a fashion designer. She created her own clothing brand DIANAARNO and her first collection, Melted Ice, was created in 2011 to participate in Miss Asia Pacific World 2011, which was held in South Korea.
