= Manav Rachna University =

University in Haryana, India

Coordinates: 28.449638°N 77.285106°E

- University Logo
- Former name: Manav Rachna College of Engineering
- Motto: Creating a better human being
- Type: Private
- Established: 2004 (as MRCE); 2014 (as University)
- Affiliations: UGC
- Chancellor: Dr. Prashant Bhalla
- Vice-Chancellor: Dr. Deependra Kumar Jha
- Faculty: 142
- Administrative staff: 210
- Students: 37,480
- Postgraduates: 16,000
- Location: Sector 43, Aravalli Hills, Delhi -Surajkund Road, 121004, Faridabad, Haryana, India
- Campus: Urban
- Website: mru.edu.in

Manav Rachna University is a private university located in Faridabad, Haryana, India. It was established as Manav Rachna College of Engineering (MRCE) in 2004 and became a university in 2014.

== Campus ==
The university's campus is in Sector 43, Faridabad located 5 km (3.1 mi) from Delhi.

== Academics ==
The university offers three-year Bachelor of Business Administration and Bachelor of Science (Honors) as well as four-year Bachelor of Technology in various fields. It also offers two-year postgraduate programmes which grant Master of Business Administration, Master of Science or Master of Technology. PhD programs are also offered.

== Microsoft Imagine Cup ==
MRU has consistently represented India and won at Microsoft Imagine Cup.

== Rankings ==
University rankings

Engineering – India
- NIRF (2024): 201-300

The National Institutional Ranking Framework (NIRF) ranked the university between 201-300 in the engineering rankings in 2024.
