= Dipna Patel =

Indian actress and model

- Born: Atlanta, Georgia, USA
- Occupations: Actor, model, entrepreneur
- Years active: 2012–present
- Known for: Gujjubhai The Great Shubharambh

Dipna Patel is an Indian actress and model. She was crowned the 2nd Runner Up at the I AM SHE – Miss India 2012. She also won the Femina Style Diva 2012 Season 1. She made her feature film debut in 2015 with Gujjubhai The Great, a comedy drama based on the franchise of Gujjubhai stage-plays by Siddharth Randeria and directed by Ishaan Randeria.

== Early life and education ==
Patel did her schooling in Baroda and pursued a degree in fashion and apparel design from NIFT, Gandhinagar.

== Career ==
Patel started her glamour career in 2011 by winning the Miss Citadel Pune (Yin Yang) title. She also won the title of Femina Style Diva 2012 1st Season and was the second runner up at the I AM SHE – Miss India 2012.

Patel made her debut in movies with the Ishaan Randeria-directed Gujarati film Gujjubhai The Great, the highest grossing Gujarati film at the time. The film is a comedy-drama based on the franchise of Gujjubhai stage plays by Siddharth Randeria. The movie had a long run in theatres- to be precise 16 weeks in the Gujarat and 8 weeks in Mumbai.

Patel has done photo shoots and advertisements for various brands, including Kohinoor Basmati Rice, PUMA and Killer Jeans. She has even done anchoring for Magna Publications

Patel won the coveted Best Actress Award (Padmarani Paritoshik Shrestha Abhinetri 2018) out of 8 nominations for her performance in the Gujarati play "Santakukdi". The play was a part of the prestigious Chitralekha Natyaspardha held annually and is an adaptation of the Marathi play White Lily Night Rider.

== Works ==
=== Plays ===
Plays	Year	Language	Genre	Director	Production
Pritam Pyare Pappuji	2012–13	Hindi	Dance Drama	Vipul Mehta	Sanjay Goradia Productions
Aadhe Adhure	2014	Hindi		Lalit Parimoo	Natsamaj
Mauj Karone Yaar	2014	Gujarati		Kiran Bhatt	Mumbai Samachar
Thappo	2015–16	Gujarati		Kamlesh Oza	Rrutu Oza Production
Mayday	2016 and 2022	Hindi and English	Musical	Trishla Patel	TPot Productions
I Cloud	2017-2020	Hindi and English		Ulka Mayur	Story Circus
The Exchange Student	2017 and 2022	Hindi and English		Trishla Patel	TPot Production
Tik Tak Tales	2016	English	Children's Play	Ulka Mayur & Songs By Mayur Puri	Story Circus
Raju, Raja Ram Aur Main	2016 - 2024	Hindi		Directed by Kedar Shinde	Sharman Joshi Productions
Santakukdi	2017	Gujarati		Shivang Thakkar	Shivansham Production
Dhamaal-E-Ishq	2019	Gujarati		Santosh Rane & Vaibhav Biniwale	Sanjay Goradia- Kaustubh Trivedi
Ballad of Desires	2022-2024	Hindi and English		Ulka Mayur	Story Circus
Guldasta Moologues	2022-2024	Hindi and Urdu		Hidayat Sami	Theatre Unit

=== Films ===
Year	Name of the film	Role	Special Notes
2015	Gujjubhai The Great	Tanisha Gandhi	Lead role (Feature Film)
2017	Beat That		Lead role (Short film)
2018	Kaarnamu		Lead role (Short film)
2018	Why did I ask ?		Lead role (Short film)
2019	The Great Indian Escape	Anu Bhargava	Cameo (Feature Film)
2022	Make her Happy	Nandita	Short Film
2022	Mumbai Dhanak		Award winning Music Video
2024	Dil Se Maya	Seema	Short Film
2024	Minus One Dollar	Hansa Bhagat	Lead role (Feature Film)

=== TV shows ===
- Kanho Banyo Common Man (2015)
- Preet Piyu Anne Pannaben (2015)
- Adaalat (2015)
- Shubharambh (2019)
