= Thomas Zilliacus =

Finnish businessman (born 1954)

- Born: Thomas Henrik Zilliacus; 15 March 1954 (age 72); Helsinki, Finland
- Education: M.S., Hanken School of Economics
- Occupation: Businessman
- Known for: Former Global Head Corporate Communications, former Regional Head Nokia Asia Pacific Rim
- Title: Founder & Chairman, Mobile FutureWorks; Founder & Chairman, NovaM Group; Founder & Chairman, XXI Century Capital
- Parent(s): Karl-Henrik "Kajus" Zilliacus; Käthe Zilliacus, née Schroeder
- Website: www.mobilefutureworks.com

Thomas Henrik Zilliacus (born 15 March 1956 is a Finnish businessman and philanthropist, residing in Singapore.

== Early life and education ==
Thomas Zilliacus was born in Helsinki, Finland in 1956. His great-great-grandfather was senator Henrik Wilhelm Johan Zilliacus, who in 1866 was elected Mayor of Helsinki, while his great-granduncle was Konni Zilliacus, the founder of the Finnish Activist Resistance Party which sought to liberate Finland from Russia. His grand uncle, Per Zilliacus, served as the head of the Finnish Military Academy and the Commander of the Finnish Civil Guard.

Zilliacus went to the Zilliacuska skolan, the Swedish-language, private, co-educational school established by his grandfather's uncle Laurin Zilliacus. Upon graduating, in 1972, Zilliacus enrolled at the University of Helsinki, where he was the editor-in-chief of the national student paper Studentbladet and three times elected as chairman of the Student Union, as well as at the Hanken School of Economics. As a promising young football player, he took time off from his studies for one term to spend one season in the youth academy of Fluminense in Rio de Janeiro.

== Politics ==
In 1979, Zilliacus was elected as the youngest member of the Helsinki City Council. In 1984, he was re-elected for a second 4-year period to the Helsinki City Council.

== Business ==
=== Nokia ===
In 1980, Zilliacus became Nokia's corporate communications global head. In 1986, he moved to Singapore as Nokia's Asia-Pacific regional head and CEO of Nokia SouthEast Asia. He was also chairman of Nokia Malaysia Sdn Bhd.

=== Mobile FutureWorks ===
In 1993, Zilliacus resigned from Nokia and founded the Mobile FutureWorks Group (MFW) investment company. Its advisory board included Pekka Tarjanne, former Minister of Communications of Finland and General Secretary of ITU, Sven-Christer Nilsson, former CEO of Ericsson, Jorma Nieminen, former CEO of Nokia Mobile Phones, and Koh Boon Hwee, former chairman of Singapore Telecom. He was elected as executive chairman of OpenMobile and co-founded the Mobile Entertainment Forum, a global organisation for companies involved in mobile value-added services. Today, Mobile FutureWorks acts as a holding company for several companies in digital media, payments, social networking, real estate and investments, most of which have been founded by Zilliacus, while the rest being companies Mobile FutureWorks has invested in.

=== YuuZoo ===
After OpenMobile was sold in 2007, Zilliacus co-founded YuuZoo Corporation, that was listed in 2014 on the Singapore Stock Exchange. With Zilliacus as Chairman & CEO, the company in 2014 was listed on the main board of the Singapore Stock Exchange. In 2015, Zilliacus stepped down as CEO and in 2018 Zilliacus resigned from his position as executive chairman.

=== Sandbox, Newkia, Ignisdraco, XXI Century Capital ===
In 2013, Zilliacus formed Newkia. In 2014, Mobile FutureWorks bought Sandbox, a Thailand-based developer of online games, and changed its focus to mobile games. Today, Sandbox is building the world's first social e-commerce platform focused exclusively on the world's more than 3 billion online and mobile gamers. Mobile FutureWorks is also the founder of Ignisdraco, a real estate developer with major projects in Indonesia and China. Zilliacus is also the founder of XXI Century Capital, an investment company focused on sports, fashion and digital media. in 2023, XXI Century Capital has published news about its bid for Manchester United FC and its investment into Milan-based fashion company Berseth Fashion Group.

=== novaM Group ===
Thomas Zilliacus is also the founder of novaM Group (Nordic Values Media). novaM is of the view that social media has gone from being an environment offering platforms for free speech and meeting friends to an environment increasingly dominated by hate speech, aggression and propaganda. novaM aims to change this by developing a new social media environment that is built on and promotes “Nordic Values”; respect, equality, dignity, diversity, democracy, truth. These are values that are shared among the Nordic countries of Finland, Sweden, Norway, Denmark and Iceland, countries that rank top of the world in quality of life, happiness, equality, democracy and press freedom.

== Board and advisory positions ==
Zilliacus has held several board and advisory positions in listed as well as non-listed companies.

== Sport and entertainment career ==
From 1982 to 1986, Zilliacus was chairman of Finnish football club HJK Helsinki. After moving to Singapore, he became the manager of Geylang International from 1989 to 1995. In March 2023, he submitted a bid to buy Premier League club Manchester United through his investment company XXI Century Capital for over 4 billion USD.
