= Miss Asia Pacific World =

- Formation: 2011; 15 years ago
- Type: Beauty Pageant
- Headquarters: Seoul
- Location: South Korea
- Official language: English

Miss Asia Pacific World is an annual beauty pageant held in South Korea. It has been subject to a number of controversies over rankings, bribes, and breast augmentation surgeries. In the 2014 Miss Asia Pacific World competition, May Myat Noe of Myanmar crowned on 31 May 2014, but dethroned three months later. This prompted the organization to conduct a new pageant in the following months. The title was won by Swetha Raj from India. In 2015, the pageant was renamed Miss Supertalent of the World.

== History ==
The first Miss Asia Pacific World pageant was held in Busan, South Korea, on 15 October 2011. Jung Eun A of Korea was crowned. The second annual Miss Asia Pacific World pageant took place in 2012 in Seoul, South Korea, on 16 June. Himangini Singh Yadu of India won the title. The third pageant was held on 30 October 2013 at Hallyuworld, Seoul, South Korea, where Srishti Rana of India was crowned.

== Controversies ==
At the 2011 pageant, Amy Willerton of Wales, along with a number of other contestants, claimed the pageant had been fixed after the woman representing Venezuela was allegedly named runner-up of the talent round before she had competed. Led by Willerton, the contestants demanded answers from organizers and later made claims that some contestants had been offered automatic top-ranking placements in exchange for sex. The illicit offers were filmed by Willerton and other contestants, and were later uploaded to YouTube under the title "Confessions of a Beauty Queen". Subsequently, she and the contestants Aletha Shepherd of Guyana, and Pamela Peralta of Costa Rica, fled their hotel to the airport. The fleeing contestants claimed the pageant organizers tried to detain them against their will and followed them to the airport to keep them from escaping. The Korean National Police Agency and organizers denied all accusations. Willerton claimed that the organizers bribed the police officers, "When the police arrived they called in one of the chairmen of the pageant who actually got his wallet out straight away and we were all pushed back by the organizers so we couldn't speak...Our translator would not translate for us, so we were completely helpless."

In September 2014, the pageant organizer's registered office in Seoul was identified as a small room in a shared office space.

May Myat Noe, the winner of the 2014 pageant, was 'dethroned' three months after her win. The organizers claim that May Myat Noe repeatedly complained about her schedule after the win and wanted her mother to stay with her during that 3-month period without having to pay the added expenses that would be incurred. Organizers also claimed she was rude and not returning phone calls.

In her press conference, May Myat Noe criticized the organizers by saying, "I'm not even proud of this crown, I don't want a crown from an organization with such a bad reputation. But I won't give it back to the Koreans unless they apologize. Not just to me but my country for giving it a bad image". She stated she would hand over the crown to the Burmese authorities but not allow it to return to the organizers in South Korea until she received a formal apology. She further stated that she, a 16-year-old, was coerced to escort Korean tycoons: "I was told that, in order to generate funds to produce my music album, I need to accept invitations to escort some business tycoons whenever they require my company".

During a media interview with MBC TV on Sept 14 in Yangon, Myanmar, she said "I am still a minor. If I'm saying I've operated my breast, then the organization is backward. When my mother and I signed the consent operation agreement, I thought it was medical check. I didn't know the meaning of the signature". It was then revealed that Noe lied about her age to participate in a local pageant in Yangon in 2013. In September 2015, the organization filed charges against May Myat Noe with the Gangnam, Seoul, Police Station, for defamation, false accusation and breach of management contract.

The organization formally accused Noe of defamation in September 2015.

== Titleholders ==
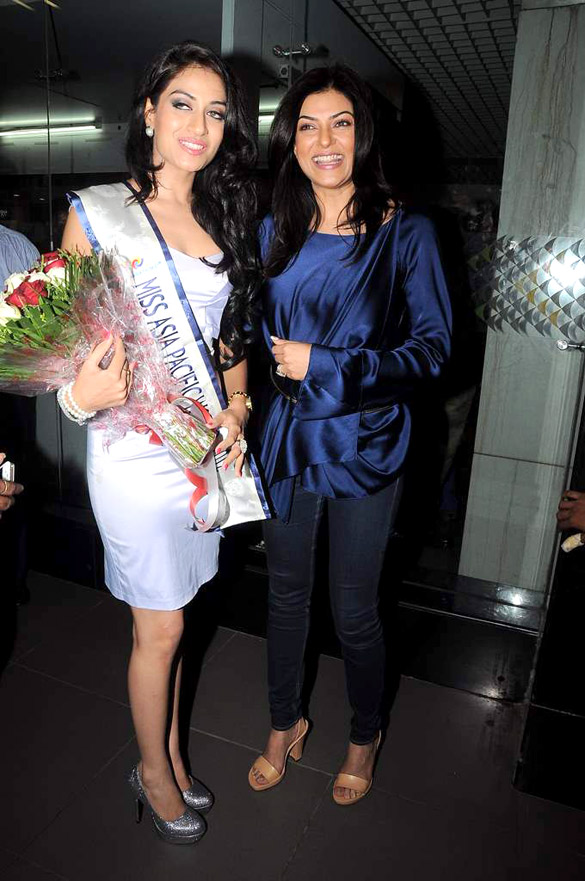
Himangini Singh Yadu (left, with Sushmita Sen) returns after winning Miss Asia Pacific World 2012

Year	Country	Miss Asia Pacific World	National Title	Location	Delegates
2014	India	Swetha Raj	Miss Diva	Seoul, South Korea	27
2014	Myanmar	May Myat Noe (Dethroned)	Miss Myanmar	Seoul, South Korea	41
2013	India	Srishti Rana	Miss Diva	Seoul, South Korea	39
2012	India	Himangini Singh Yadu	I Am She–Miss Universe India	Seoul, South Korea	39
2011	Ukraine	Diana Starkova (Assumed)	Miss Ukraine	Busan, South Korea	54
2011	France	Florima Treiber (Dethroned)	6th runner up of Miss France 2008	Busan, South Korea	54

Pageant renamed since 2015 to Miss Supertalent of the World

== Miss Asia Pacific World 2011 ==
Miss Asia Pacific World
- Date: 15 October 2011
- Venue: Quinta Vergara Amphitheater, Viña Del Mar, Chile
- Broadcaster: Earthcam, RBS Japan, Channel Young, Televisión Nacional de Chile
- Entrants: 54
- Placements: 15
- Winner: Diana Starkova; Ukraine

The 2011 competition was the first edition of the Miss Asia Pacific World pageant. It was held in Viña Del Mar, Chile on 15 October 2011. Diana Starkova of Ukraine was crowned by the end of the event.

=== Results ===
Final results	Contestant
Miss Asia Pacific World 2011	France – Florima Treiber (dethroned); Ukraine – Diana Starkova(assumed)
1st Runner-up	Indonesia – Alesssandra Khadijah Usman
2nd Runner-up	India – Tanvi Singla
3rd Runner-up	Canada – Golnaz Harandi
4th Runner-up	South Korea – Park Sae Byul §
Top 17	Netherlands – Angela van den Broek; Estonia – Diana Arno; Hungary – Ivett Venczlik; England – Laura Louise Keetley; Mongolia – Urantsetseg Ganbold; Nepal – Sahana Bajracharya; Puerto Rico – Ingrid Fernández; Sweden – Anna Lundh; United States – Tingting Chen; Venezuela – Yunecsy Tuta §; Vietnam – Trương Tùng Lan

§ – Voted into the Top 17 by viewers

=== Contestants ===
Country/Territory	Contestant	Age	Height	Hometown
Argentina	Nadia Yanina Lozza	18	1.72 m (5 ft 7 1/2 in)	Buenos Aires
Australia	Kelly Louise Maguire	24	1.78 m (5 ft 10 in)	Sydney
Bangladesh	Rukshana Hera	23	1.68 m (5 ft 6 in)	Dhaka
Brazil	Juliete de Pieri	20	1.74 m (5 ft 8 1/2 in)	Primavera do Leste
Canada	Golnaz Harandi	20	1.75 m (5 ft 9 in)	Vancouver
Cameroon	Olga Essouma	25	1.77 m (5 ft 9 1/2 in)	Yaoundé
China	Bian Xue-Ying	21	1.75 m (5 ft 9 in)	Shanghai
Costa Rica	Pamela Peralta	21	1.75 m (5 ft 9 in)	San José
Denmark	Maria Sten Knudsen	21	1.82 m (5 ft 11 1/2 in)	Copenhagen
England	Laura Louise Keetley	21	1.75 m (5 ft 9 in)	London
Estonia	Diana Arno	26	1.81 m (5 ft 11 1/2 in)	Tallinn
Finland	Linnea Aaltonen	23	1.69 m (5 ft 6 1/2 in)	Helsinki
France	Florima Treiber	24	1.80 m (5 ft 11 in)	Colmar
Guam	Naiomie Jean Santos	19	1.79 m (5 ft 10 1/2 in)	Maina
Guyana	Aletha Shepherd	22	1.72 m (5 ft 7 1/2 in)	Georgetown
Hong Kong	Zhao Xue-Ying	20	1.75 m (5 ft 9 in)	Hong Kong
Hungary	Ivett Venczlik	22	1.70 m (5 ft 7 in)	Budapest
India	Tanvi Singla	19	1.70 m (5 ft 7 in)	Mumbai
Indonesia	Alessandra Khadijah Usman	22	1.68 m (5 ft 6 in)	Gorontalo
Ireland	Su Ekin Culculoglu	18	1.75 m (5 ft 9 in)	Dublin
Japan	Sonoko Chinen	21	1.68 m (5 ft 6 in)	Okinawa
Kazakhstan	Diana Yamlikhanova	19	1.72 m (5 ft 7 1/2 in)	Almaty
Korea	Park Sae Bell	24	1.68 m (5 ft 6 in)	Daegu
Kyrgyzstan	Kseniia Barannikova	19	1.78 m (5 ft 10 in)	Bishkek
Latvia	Anita Baltruna	27	1.75 m (5 ft 9 in)	Jelgava
'Malaysia	Suzanne Loh Lih Fan	23	1.70 m (5 ft 7 in)	Kuala Lumpur
Mali	Linda Sanogo	21	1.74 m (5 ft 8 1/2 in)	Aarhus
Mexico	Alejandra Balderas Flores	19	1.70 m (5 ft 7 in)	Villahermosa
Moldova	Irina Botnaru	23	1.68 m (5 ft 6 in)	Chișinău
Mongolia	Urantsetseg Ganbold	27	1.79 m (5 ft 10 1/2 in)	Ömnögovi
Nepal	Sahana Bajracharya	22	1.67 m (5 ft 5 1/2 in)	Kathmandu
Netherlands	Angela van den Broek	20	1.74 m (5 ft 8 1/2 in)	Amsterdam
Panama	Karen Jordan	21	1.75 m (5 ft 9 in)	Panama City
Peru	Elizabeth Aedo	26	1.79 m (5 ft 10 1/2 in)	Lima
Philippines	Michelle Martha Braun	21	1.73 m (5 ft 8 in)	Aklan
Portugal	Ana Rodriguez Cunha	20	1.76 m (5 ft 9 1/2 in)	Lisbon
Puerto Rico	Ingrid Fernandez	26	1.79 m (5 ft 10 1/2 in)	San Juan
Romania	Beatrix-Julia Hack	20	1.73 m (5 ft 8 in)	Targu-Mures
Russia	Anna Botova	24	1.76 m (5 ft 9 1/2 in)	Moscow
Scotland	Naomi Autumn Yong	21	1.66 m (5 ft 5 1/2 in)	Edinburgh
Singapore	Patricia Eng	22	1.70 m (5 ft 7 in)	Singapore
Sweden	Anna Lundh	24	1.73 m (5 ft 8 in)	Stockholm
Tahiti	Tetuaunurau Maitia	19	1.76 m (5 ft 9 1/2 in)	Papeete
Taiwan	Chen Li-Chia	26	1.70 m (5 ft 7 in)	Taipei
Thailand	Marissada Chirasevinupraphand	19	1.70 m (5 ft 7 in)	Bangkok
Tibet	Tenzin Yangkyi	19	1.71 m (5 ft 7 1/2 in)	Zurich
Tonga	Mary Greatz	22	1.76 m (5 ft 9 1/2 in)	Nukuʻalofa
Tunisia	Syrine Koubaa	22	1.75 m (5 ft 9 in)	Tunis
United States	Tingting Chen	26	1.70 m (5 ft 7 in)	Washington, D.C.
Venezuela	Yunecsy Tuta	25	1.75 m (5 ft 9 in)	Caracas
Vietnam	Trương Tùng Lan	21	1.70 m (5 ft 7 in)	Quang Ninh
Wales	Amy Louise Willerton	19	1.75 m (5 ft 9 in)	Cardiff

=== Replacements ===
- Mongolia – Bayaarkhuu Gantogoo
- Scotland – Anastasia Mikhailides
- Taiwan – Zhu Ri-Xing
- Vietnam – Vũ Thị Hoàng My decided to compete at the Miss Universe 2011 in São Paulo, Brazil.

== Miss Asia Pacific World 2012 ==
Miss Asia Pacific World
- Date: 16 June 2012
- Venue: Hallyuworld, Seoul (South Korea)
- Broadcaster: Earthcam, RBS Japan, Channel Young, Kantipur
- Entrants: 39
- Placements: 15
- Debuts: Armenia, Bhutan, Bulgaria, Czech Republic, Dominican Republic, Germany, Israel, Kenya, Lebanon, Macedonia, Montenegro, Niger, Sri Lanka, Turkey, Uzbekistan
- Withdrawals: Argentina, Bangladesh, Canada, Costa Rica, Denmark, England, Finland, France, Guam, Guyana, Hong Kong, Hungary, Ireland, Korea, Kyrgyzstan, Mali, Mexico, Nepal, Netherlands, Panama, Peru, Romania, Scotland, Sweden, Tahiti, Tibet, Tonga, Tunisia, United States, Vietnam, Wales
- Winner: Himangini Singh Yadu; India

The second edition of the Miss Asia Pacific World Super Talent pageant took place in 2012. It was held in Seoul, South Korea on 16 June. Himangini Singh Yadu of India won the title. Next year she crowned her successor from India.

=== Results ===
Final results	Contestant
Miss Asia Pacific World 2012	India – Himangini Singh Yadu
1st Runner-up	Mongolia – Tuyamaa Tumenjargal
2nd Runner-up	Latvia – Diana Kubasova
3rd Runner-up	Ukraine – Oleksandra Berezovska
4th Runner-up	Thailand – Grace Courvoisier
5th Runner-up	Lebanon – Nathaly Farraj
6th Runner-up	Germany – Alena Senatorova
7th Runner-up	Puerto Rico – Janice Rivera
Top 15	Cameroon – Aurele Fanny Nguelieu; Estonia – Julia Perlin; Indonesia – Andi Tenri Natassa; Kenya – Martha Thuo; Philippines – Grendel Alvarado §; Sri Lanka – Gayesha Perera; Turkey – Ecem Uzgor

§ – Voted into the Top 15 by viewers

=== Special awards ===
Award	Contestant
Miss Talent	Turkey: Ecem Uzgor
Miss Personality	Indonesia: Andi Tenri Natassa
Best Body	Puerto Rico – Janice Riveramelia
Best Evening Gown	Philippines – Grendel Alvarado
Best National Costume	Sri Lanka: Gayesha Perera
Miss Asia Pacific World Star	Lebanon – Nathaly Farraj
Best Model	Philippines – Grendel Alvarado
The World's Most Beautiful Supertalent	Latvia – Diana Kubasova

=== Contestants ===
Country/Territory	Contestant	Age	Height	Hometown
Armenia	Mariana Manukyan	27	1.71 m (5 ft 7 1/2 in)	Yerevan
Australia	Courtney Day	20	1.78 m (5 ft 10 in)	Sydney
Bhutan	Sonam Choden Retty	25	1.75 m (5 ft 9 in)	Thimphu
Brazil	Juliete de Pieri	20	1.74 m (5 ft 8 1/2 in)	Mato Grosso
Bulgaria	Alexandra Yancheva	20	1.74 m (5 ft 8 1/2 in)	Sofia
Cameroon	Aurele Fanny Nguelieu	22	1.79 m (5 ft 10 1/2 in)	Yaoundé
China	Sun Yan	20	1.79 m (5 ft 10 1/2 in)	Shanghai
Czech Republic	Jana Zajicova	24	1.76 m (5 ft 9 1/2 in)	Prague
Dominican Republic	Yudy Rodriguez	21	1.76 m (5 ft 9 1/2 in)	Santo Domingo
Estonia	Julia Perlin	21	1.74 m (5 ft 8 1/2 in)	Tallinn
Ethiopia	Desta Undesa	22	1.78 m (5 ft 10 in)	Amharic
Germany	Alena Senatorova	23	1.69 m (5 ft 6 1/2 in)	Berlin
India	Himangini Singh Yadu	22	1.73 m (5 ft 8 in)	Mumbai
Indonesia	Andi Tenri Natassa	19	1.71 m (5 ft 7 1/2 in)	Makassar
Israel	Yael Markovich	22	1.68 m (5 ft 6 in)	Haifa
Japan	Eriko Yoshii	22	1.74 m (5 ft 8 1/2 in)	Akita
Kazakhstan	Inessa Nazarova			Almaty
Kenya	Martha Thuo	22	1.72 m (5 ft 7 1/2 in)	
Latvia	Diana Kubasova	22	1.75 m (5 ft 9 in)	Riga
Lebanon	Nathaly Farraj	23	1.72 m (5 ft 7 1/2 in)	Beirut
Macedonia	Jana Burcevska			Skopje
'Malaysia	L Liss Wong	19	1.70 m (5 ft 7 in)	Kuala Lumpur
Moldova	Veronica Chira	19	1.75 m (5 ft 9 in)	Chișinău
Mongolia	Tuyamaa Tumenjargal			Ömnögovi
Montenegro	Markovic Sandra	19	1.78 m (5 ft 10 in)	Podgorica
Niger	Sounna Cherifaiou	20	1.71 m (5 ft 7 1/2 in)	Niamey
Philippines	Grendel Alvarado	21	1.72 m (5 ft 7 1/2 in)	Aklan
Portugal	Morgana Nogueira	21	1.75 m (5 ft 9 in)	Lisbon
Puerto Rico	Janice Rivera			San Juan
Russia	Elena Riabinina	21	1.78 m (5 ft 10 in)	Moscow
Siberia	Olesya Shchemirskaya	23	1.75 m (5 ft 9 in)	Siberian Federal District
Singapore	Suzanne Chu Siu Yen			Singapore
Sri Lanka	Gayesha Perera	24	1.72 m (5 ft 7 1/2 in)	Sri Jayawardenepura Kotte
Taiwan	Hui-Hua Chen	23	1.70 m (5 ft 7 in)	Taipei
Thailand	Chawanluck Grace Unger	18	1.74 m (5 ft 8 1/2 in)	Bangkok
Turkey	Ecem Uzgor	21	1.73 m (5 ft 8 in)	Ankara
Ukraine	Kateryna Shevchenko	26	1.72 m (5 ft 7 1/2 in)	Kyiv
Uzbekistan	Sayyora Sagindikova			Uzbek
Venezuela	Gabriela Ríos			Caracas

=== Historical significance ===
- India won the Miss Asia Pacific World title for the first time.
- Cameroon, Germany, Kenya, Latvia, Lebanon, Philippines, Sri Lanka Thailand and Turkey placed for the first time.
- Estonia, India, Indonesia, Mongolia, Puerto Rico, and Ukraine placed for the second time.

== Miss Asia Pacific World 2013 ==
Miss Asia Pacific World
- Date: 30 October 2013
- Venue: Polideportivo Islas Malvinas Mar Del Plata, Argentina
- Broadcaster: Earthcam, RBS Japan, Channel Young, Kantipur
- Entrants: 41
- Placements: 15
- Winner: Srishti Rana; India

The third annual Miss Asia Pacific World 2013 was held on 30 October 2013, at the Polideportivo Islas Malvinas Mar Del Plata, Argentina. Himangini Singh Yadu of India crowned her successor Srishti Rana of India at the end of this event.

Results
Placement	Contestant
Miss Asia Pacific World 2013	India – Shristi Rana
1st Runner-Up	Egypt – Meriam George
2nd Runner-Up	Kazakhstan – Yevgeniya Klishina
3rd Runner-Up	Russia – Yekaterina Grushanina
4th Runner-Up	Sweden – Moa Madicken Öberg
5th Runner-Up	Monaco – Battulga Bilguunzaya
6th Runner-Up	Australia – La Toyah Asha James
Top 15	Central African Republic – Manuella Rossi; Latvia – Simona Kubasova; Mozambique – Carmen Milton; Nepal – Malina Joshi; Philippines – Czarina Rosales; Trinidad and Tobago – Greer Iton; Ukraine – Alla Zavhorodnia; Vietnam – Diem Thuyen Tran Ngoc

=== Contestants ===
21 delegates were confirmed:

Country/Territory	Contestant	Age	Height (m)	Height (ft in)	Hometown
Belgium	Adelina Berisha	18	1.75	5 ft 9 in	Brussels
Cameroon	Mbassi Ingrid	25	1.75	5 ft 9 in	Yaoundé
Central African Republic	Manuella Rossi	24	1.72	5 ft 8 in	Bangui
Crimea	Kristina Magerovska	21	1.72	5 ft 8 in	Simferopol
Ethiopia	Desta Undesa	23	1.78	5 ft 10 in	Addis Ababa
France	Lucile Briegel	22	1.75	5 ft 9 in	Paris
Guinea	Souadou Drame	20	1.76	5 ft 9 in	Conakry
India	Srishti Rana	23	1.70	5 ft 7 in	Mumbai
Iran	Farnoush Hamid	25	1.78	5 ft 10 in	Teheran
Kazakhstan	Evgenia Klishina	25	1.76	5 ft 9 in	Astana
Kyrgyzstan	Gulnara Zhanybekova	22	1.79	5 ft 10 in	Bishkek
Latvia	Elvira Teberga	20	1.70	5 ft 7 in	Riga
Mexico	Laura Elisa Alvarez	23	1.70	5 ft 7 in	Mexicali
Mozambique	Carmen Milton	20	1.72	5 ft 8 in	Maputo
Senegal	Amina Sanghott	19	1.75	5 ft 9 in	Dakar
Taiwan	Tzu Yun Chang	22	1.70	5 ft 7 in	Taipei
Trinidad & Tobago	Greer Iton	25	1.74	5 ft 9 in	Port of Spain
Uganda	Stella Semakula Nankya	25	1.72	5 ft 8 in	Kampala
Ukraine	Arina Domski Nankya	26	1.65	5 ft 5 in	Kyiv

== Miss Asia Pacific World 2014 ==
Placement	Contestant
Miss Asia Pacific World 2014	Myanmar – May Myat Noe (dethroned)
1st Runner-Up	South Korea – Kim Eea
2nd Runner-Up	Macau – Hio Man Cha
3rd Runner-Up	Philippines – Hillarie Parungao
4th Runner-Up	India – Anukriti Gusain
5th Runner-Up	Singapore – Poojaa Kaur Gill
6th Runner-Up	Thailand – Nisanat Mongsai
Top 15	Czech Republic – Lenka Josefiova; Ecuador – Dianella Lopez; Germany – Johanna Acs; Honduras – Natalia Coto; Pakistan – Shanzay Hayat; Slovakia – Petra Tonhauserova; Sri Lanka – Amanda Silva; Trinidad and Tobago – Tiffany Hunte

== See also ==
- List of beauty contests
