= Srishti Rana =

Indian model and beauty pageant contestant

- Born: Srishti Rana; 13 October 1993 (age 33); Faridabad, Haryana, India
- Title: Femina Miss India Delhi 2013; Femina Miss India 2013 (Top 5); Miss Diva Delhi 2013 (Winner); Miss Diva 2013 (Miss India Asia Pacific World 2013); Miss Asia Pacific World 2013 (Winner)

Srishti Rana is an Indian model and beauty pageant titleholder. She participated in Miss Diva - Miss Universe India 2013 and won the title of Miss India Asia Pacific 2013. She went on to represent India at Miss Asia Pacific World 2013 in October 2013, which took place in Seoul, Korea. She emerged as the winner of the Miss Asia Pacific World title, beating 21 other contestants from different countries. The title is very different from the coveted Miss Asia Pacific International title won by Dia Mirza in 2000.

She was also a contestant of Femina Miss India 2013 and finished in Top 5. She was featured in the Times of India's list of 50 most desirable women for the years 2014 and 2015.

She has walked for several designers as a show stopper and as a closing model. She has walked for designers including Manish Malhotra, Anju Modi, Varun Bahl, Gaurav Gupta, Rohit Bal, Shehla Khan, Shantanu and Nikhil, Rocky S, Saisha Shinde, Mandira Wirk, and Neeta Lulla.

== Early life and education ==
Rana was born to Anand Rana and Suman Rana. Her father is an advocate and mother a homemaker. She did her schooling from Modern Vidya Niketan schools in Faridabad, and is a major in English Honors from University of Delhi. She also attended Manav Rachna International University where she did a Journalism and Mass Communication course, followed by a postgraduate degree in Mass Communication and Journalism from Asian Academy of Film & Television.

== Awards and recognition ==
=== Miss Asia Pacific World 2013 ===
Rana was sent as the Indian delegate in Miss Asia Pacific World pageant and later won the title of Miss Asia Pacific World 2013.

=== Miss India Universe 2013 ===
She participated in Femina Miss India Universe (Miss Diva - 2013) and was crowned Miss India Asia Pacific World 2013.

=== Miss Diva Delhi 2013 ===
Rana was the winner of Miss Diva Delhi 2013.

=== Femina Miss India 2013 ===
She was the 3rd runner-up of Femina Miss India on 24 March 2013, and was also awarded the title of Femina Miss Fashion Icon.

=== Femina Miss India Delhi 2013 ===
She was one of the three title holders of Pond's Femina Miss India Delhi 2013.
