= Diana Starkova =

French and Ukrainian beauty queen from Monaco

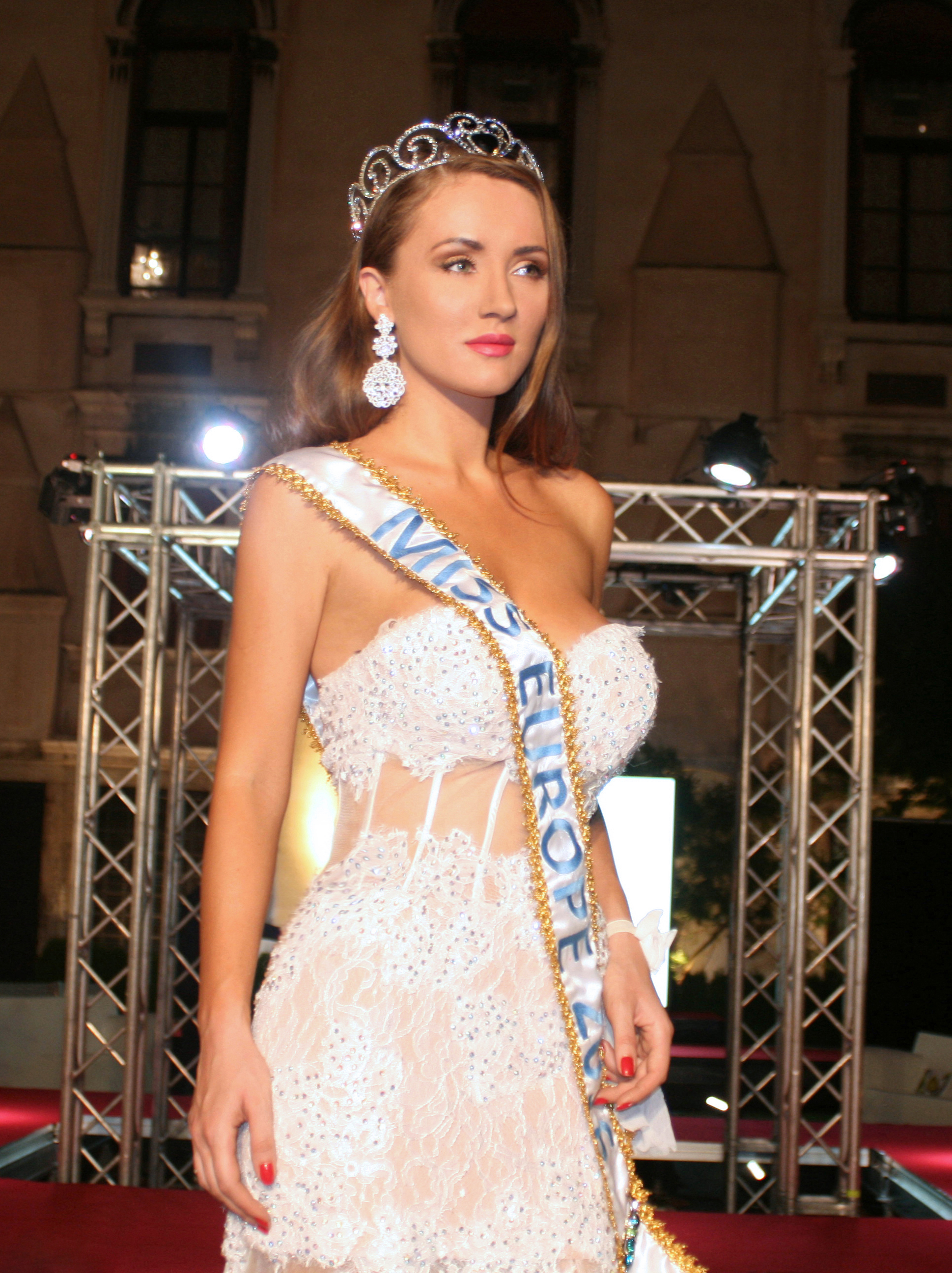
- Diana Starkova at Miss Europe contest
- Occupation: model
- Title: Miss Europe 2016; Miss Asia Pacific World 2011; Miss Intercontinental Ukraine 2007; Miss Ukraine Earth 2003
- Modeling information
- Height: 177 cm (5 ft 10 in)
- Hair color: dark blond
- Eye color: green
- Agency: IMG models

Diana Starkova is a French and Ukrainian beauty queen from Monaco, who won Miss Europe 2016 beauty pageant. She was also Miss Ukraine Earth but did not compete at Miss Earth 2003. She was Miss Intercontinental Ukraine 2007 and won Miss Asia Pacific World 2011 after resignation and dethroning of the 2 previous winners. She is a student of Paris-Sorbonne University of History of Art and Archeology department.

== Biography ==
Diana's career started from Elite Model Look contest.

=== Miss Europe ===
Diana career started when she was appointed to represent France at Miss Europe beauty pageant. Diana won Miss Europe title representing France. She bested 34 European delegates and was crowned with tiara signed by Chopard which is set with 678 diamonds mounted on 130 grams of gold. The centerpiece is a rare dark heart-shaped 26.40 carat diamond in white gold. Crown estimated at 350,000 EUR and previously worn by Miss Europe winners since 2003. With the title Starkova received a contract of 2,500,000 EUR and professional representation by the Miss Europe Organization, tiara with 678 diamonds mounted on 130 grams of gold signed by Chopard and estimated 350,000 EUR, diamond jewelry set matching to the crown and watch by Chopard, 650,000 EUR cash prize, one-year supply of hair-care products and tools from Kerastase Haircare, a shoe wardrobe from Christian Louboutin, extensive travel representing sponsors, private jet transportation for one year, evening gown wardrobe by Elie Saab, a year's worth of skincare products from La Prairie Skincare. During her reign Diana represented Dolce Gabbana, been a guest of Cannes Film Festival, Venice Film Festival and also been awarded Supermodel of the Year.
