= Miss Spain 2015 =

Miss Spain 2015 may refer to these events:

- Miss Universe Spain 2015, Miss Spain 2015 for Miss Universe 2015
- Miss World Spain 2015, Miss Spain 2015 for Miss World 2015
