= Miss Spain 2016 =

Miss Spain 2016 may refer to these events:

- Miss Universe Spain 2016, Miss Spain 2016 for Miss Universe 2016
- Miss World Spain 2016, Miss Spain 2016 for Miss World 2016
