= Miss Spain 2021 =

Miss Spain 2021 may refer to these events:

- Miss Universe Spain 2021, Miss Spain 2021 for Miss Universe 2021
- Miss World Spain 2020, Miss Spain 2020 for Miss World 2021/2020
