= Miss Spain 2020 =

Miss Spain 2020 may refer to these events:

- Miss Universe Spain 2020, Miss Spain 2020 for Miss Universe 2020
- Miss World Spain 2020, Miss Spain 2020 for Miss World 2021/2020
