= Lucía Heredia =

Spanish model (born 1996)

- Born: 1996 (age 29–30); Ceuta, Spain
- Occupation: Beauty pageant contestant
- Title: Miss World Ceuta 2019

Lucía Heredia Pablos (born 1996) is a Spanish model. In 2019 she won the beauty pageant Miss World Ceuta becoming the first trans woman to win said contest, and the second to achieve this at a national level, after Ángela Ponce.

== Biography ==
At thirteen years old, she realized and informed her family that her sex did not match her gender identity, so her mother called her Lucía. At 21 years old, she underwent Gender-affirming surgery.

In September 2019 she won the beauty pageant Miss World Ceuta among eight contestants. The victory qualified her for the pageant Miss World Spain 2020 celebrated in Marina d'Or, but she failed to reach the final. However, she was the first trans woman to participate in Miss World Spain.
