= Miss World Spain 2016 =

- Date: September 17, 2016
- Presenters: Beatriz Jarrín Lera
- Entertainment: Elisabeth Borne; Larrick Ebanks
- Venue: Auditorium Theatre, Salou, Tarragona, Spain
- Entrants: 25
- Withdrawals: Alicante; Extremadura
- Returns: Aragón; Galicia; Madrid; Navarre
- Winner: Raquel Tejedor Melendez; Aragón

Miss World Spain 2016 was the 4th edition of the Miss World Spain pageant, held on September 17, 2016. The winner was Raquel Tejedor Melendez of Aragón and she represented Spain in Miss World 2016. This was the last edition of Miss World Spain under the Be Miss Organization. Later in the year, they give up the license to focus solely on Miss Universe Spain. The license then went to Nuestra Belleza España.

== Results ==
Placement	Contestant
Miss World Spain 2016	Aragón – Raquel Tejedor
1st Runner-Up	Lérida – Carla Font Cabrera
2nd Runner-Up	Madrid – Miriam Paredes Ginés

== Official Delegates ==
Province	Candidate
Aragón	Raquel Tejedor Melendez
Asturias	Alicia Díaz López
Balearic Islands	Claudia Cruz García González
Barcelona	Carla Hernandez Gómez
Basque	Laura Picaza Álvarez de Eulate
Cádiz	Sara López Otero
Castellón	Jéssica Maso Bartoll
Castilla-La Mancha	Rosa Maria Beño Ruiz de la Sierra
Castile and León	Lara Fernandez Bajo
Galicia	Zulema Vázquez Rey
Gerona	Magnolia Maria Martinez Ortuño
Huelva	Blanca Paloma Lora Ramírez
Jaén	Carolina Pérez Martinez
La Rioja	Nathalie Mamolar Domenech
Las Palmas	Marta Álvarez Sanchez
Lérida	Carla Font Cabrera
Madrid	Miriam Paredes Ginés
Málaga	Carmen Serrano Porras
Melilla	Patricia Lara Lupiañez
Murcia	Lidia Rosauro Martinez
Navarre	Alba Medina Navarro
Sevilla	Candela Victoria Garrido Punta
Tarragona	Nadia Sanromá Murillo
Tenerife	Priscila Medina Quintero
Valencia	Rebeca Kenda Nana Barrentes

== Notes ==
=== Returns ===
Last competed in 2011:

- Navarre

Last competed in 2014:

- Aragón
- Galicia
- Madrid

=== Withdrawals ===
- Alicante
- Extremadura

=== Did not compete ===
- Albacete
- Almería
- Araba
- Ávila
- Badajoz
- Burgos
- Cáceres
- Canary Islands
- Cantabria
- Ceuta
- Ciudad Real
- Córdoba
- Cuenca
- Granada
- Guadalajara
- Guipúzcoa
- Huesca
- La Coruña
- León
- Lugo
- Orense
- Pontevedra
- Salamanca
- Segovia
- Soria
- Teruel
- Toledo
- Valladolid
- Vizcaya
- Zamora
- Zaragoza
