= Miss World Spain 2020 =

Beauty pageant edition

- Date: July 25, 2020
- Venue: Marina d'Or - Ciudad Vacaciones, Oropesa del Mar, Castellón, Valencia Region, Spain
- Entrants: 52
- Placements: 20
- Withdrawals: Canary Islands
- Winner: Ana García Segundo; Almería

Miss World Spain 2020 was the 8th edition of the Miss World Spain pageant. The winner was Ana García Segundo of Almería and she represented Spain at Miss World 2021.

== Final results ==
=== Placements ===
Final results	Contestant
Miss World Spain 2020	Almería — Ana García Segundo
1st Runner-Up	Valladolid — Elena Cesteros
2nd Runner-Up	Barcelona — Sabela Álvarez
3rd Runner-Up	Las Palmas — Cárla Benitez
4th Runner-Up	Málaga — Blanca Aguilera
Top 10	Cádiz — Nerea Ponce; Cuenca — Andrea Rodríguez; Gerona — Laura Mora; Madrid — Desiree Brampton; Valencia Province — Rosa Nouvilas
Top 20	Alicante — Ada Quintana; Araba — Rubely Mejía; Balearic Islands — Nerea Mas; Castellón — Sandra Navarro; Granada — Carmen Cerrillo; Jaén — Ines García; La Rioja — Ruth Aldea; Tarragona — Elisabeth Borne; Zamora — Carla Lopez; Zaragoza — Laura Cerdán

=== Challenge Events ===
==== Beauty with a Purpose ====
Final results	Contestant
Winner	Barcelona — Sabela Álvarez
Top 5	Guadalajara — Oricia Dominguez; Las Palmas — Cárla Benitez; Palencia — Gema Torres; Tenerife — Amelia Fuentes

==== Multimedia ====
Final results	Contestant
Winner	Jaén — Ines García
Top 5	Cantabria — Cárla Moro; Orense — Lucía Lamas; Valencia Province — Rosa Nouvilas; Zaragoza — Laura Cerdán

==== Top Model ====
Final results	Contestant
Winner	Almería — Ana García Segundo
Top 5	Madrid — Desiree Brampton; Melilla — Catalina Martínez; Sevilla — Marina Pérez; Valladolid — Elena Cesteros

==== Sports ====
Final results	Contestant
Winner	La Rioja — Ruth Aldea
Top 5	Málaga — Blanca Aguilera; Murcia — Isabel Bolet; Soria — Eve Denayer; Tenerife — Amelia Fuentes

==== Talent ====
Final results	Contestant
Winner	Tarragona — Elisabeth Borne
Top 5	Cantabria — Cárla Moro; Palencia — Gema Torres; Pontevedra — Cristina García; Sevilla — Marina Pérez
Top 10	Badajoz — Laura Dominguez; Barcelona — Sabela Álvarez; Córdoba — María Roldán; Madrid — Desiree Brampton; Soria — Eve Denayer

==== Regional Costume ====
Final results	Contestant
Winner	Valencia Province — Rosa Nouvilas
Top 5	Cáceres — Susana Mayoral; Salamanca — Maria Gomez; Sevilla — Marina Pérez; Tenerife — Amelia Fuentes

==== Public Vote ====
Final results	Contestant
Winner	Zaragoza — Laura Cerdán
Top 5	Barcelona — Sabela Álvarez; Madrid — Desiree Brampton; Vizcaya — Romina Amieva; Tenerife — Amelia Fuentes

== Judges ==
- Francisco Fajardo - President/Head of the Judges
- Mireia Lalaguna Royo - Miss World Spain 2015 from Barcelona & Miss World 2015 from Spain
- Cuca Miquel
- Carlos Pérez Gimeno
- Daniel Carnade
- David Cabaleiro
- Jorge Borrajo
- Rachid Mohamed
- Andrea Ventulori

== Official Delegates ==
The delegates for Miss World Spain 2020 are:

Province	Candidate	Age	Height
Albacete	Mireia Lopez	23	174 cm (5 ft 8.5 in)
Alicante	Ada Quintana	23	170 cm (5 ft 7 in)
Almería	Ana García Segundo	23	180 cm (5 ft 11 in)
Araba	Rubely Mejía	21	178 cm (5 ft 10 in)
Asturias	Sandra Muñiz	19	176 cm (5 ft 9.5 in)
Ávila	Carmen Díaz	25	170 cm (5 ft 7 in)
Badajoz	Laura Dominguez	18	175 cm (5 ft 9 in)
Balearic Islands	Nerea Mas	17	169 cm (5 ft 6.5 in)
Barcelona	Sabela Álvarez	25	178 cm (5 ft 10 in)
Burgos	Elsa García-Tuñon	19	171 cm (5 ft 7.5 in)
Cáceres	Susana Mayoral	20	174 cm (5 ft 8.5 in)
Cádiz	Nerea Ponce	19	183 cm (6 ft 0 in)
Cantabria	Cárla Moro	20	166 cm (5 ft 5.5 in)
Castellón	Sandra Navarro	20	170 cm (5 ft 7 in)
Ceuta	Lucía Heredia	23	171 cm (5 ft 7.5 in)
Ciudad Real	Patrícia Martínez	20	179 cm (5 ft 10.5 in)
Córdoba	María Roldán	21	169 cm (5 ft 6.5 in)
Cuenca	Andrea Rodríguez	22	172 cm (5 ft 7.5 in)
Gerona	Laura Mora	23	176 cm (5 ft 9.5 in)
Granada	Carmen Cerrillo	23	183 cm (6 ft 0 in)
Guadalajara	Oricia Dominguez	26	174 cm (5 ft 8.5 in)
Guipúzcoa	Leire Merino	19	176 cm (5 ft 9.5 in)
Huelva	Claudia Mera	21	176 cm (5 ft 9.5 in)
Huesca	Cárla Domenech	22	175 cm (5 ft 9 in)
Jaén	Ines García	22	169 cm (5 ft 6.5 in)
La Coruña	Maria Gundín	17	175 cm (5 ft 9 in)
La Rioja	Ruth Aldea	22	169 cm (5 ft 6.5 in)
Las Palmas	Cárla Benitez	20	176 cm (5 ft 9.5 in)
León	Natalia Alvarez	18	172 cm (5 ft 7.5 in)
Lérida	Nuria Gombau	25	179 cm (5 ft 10.5 in)
Lugo	Beatriz Balseiro	22	178 cm (5 ft 10 in)
Madrid	Desiree Brampton	21	182 cm (5 ft 11.5 in)
Málaga	Blanca Aguilera	22	174 cm (5 ft 8.5 in)
Melilla	Catalina Martínez	17	183 cm (6 ft 0 in)
Murcia	Isabel Bolet	24	167 cm (5 ft 6 in)
Navarre	Lorea Ibañez	20	175 cm (5 ft 9 in)
Orense	Lucía Lamas	19	181 cm (5 ft 11.5 in)
Palencia	Gema Torres	25	172 cm (5 ft 7.5 in)
Pontevedra	Cristina García	25	176 cm (5 ft 9.5 in)
Salamanca	Maria Gomez	20	170 cm (5 ft 7 in)
Segovia	Cynthia Martin	21	177 cm (5 ft 9.5 in)
Sevilla	Marina Pérez	25	183 cm (6 ft 0 in)
Soria	Eve Denayer	20	181 cm (5 ft 11.5 in)
Tarragona	Elisabeth Borne	25	174 cm (5 ft 8.5 in)
Tenerife	Amelia Fuentes	24	172 cm (5 ft 7.5 in)
Teruel	Sara Botella	25	172 cm (5 ft 7.5 in)
Toledo	Alba Merenciano	22	162 cm (5 ft 4 in)
Valencia Province	Rosa Nouvilas	23	176 cm (5 ft 9.5 in)
Valladolid	Elena Cesteros	18	175 cm (5 ft 9 in)
Vizcaya	Romina Amieva	20	180 cm (5 ft 11 in)
Zamora	Carla Lopez	19	175 cm (5 ft 9 in)
Zaragoza	Laura Cerdán	21	165 cm (5 ft 5.5 in)

== Notes ==
=== Replacements ===
- Ávila - Carmen Díaz replaced Roció Santos.
- La Coruña - Maria Gundín replaced Marta Martinez.
- Murcia - Isabel Bolet replaced Yolanda Ortiz.
- Soria - Eve Denayer replaced Elianny Cuevas.

=== Withdrawals ===
- Canary Islands

=== Did not compete ===
- Aragón
- Extremadura
- Galicia
