= Helen Lindes =

Spanish model

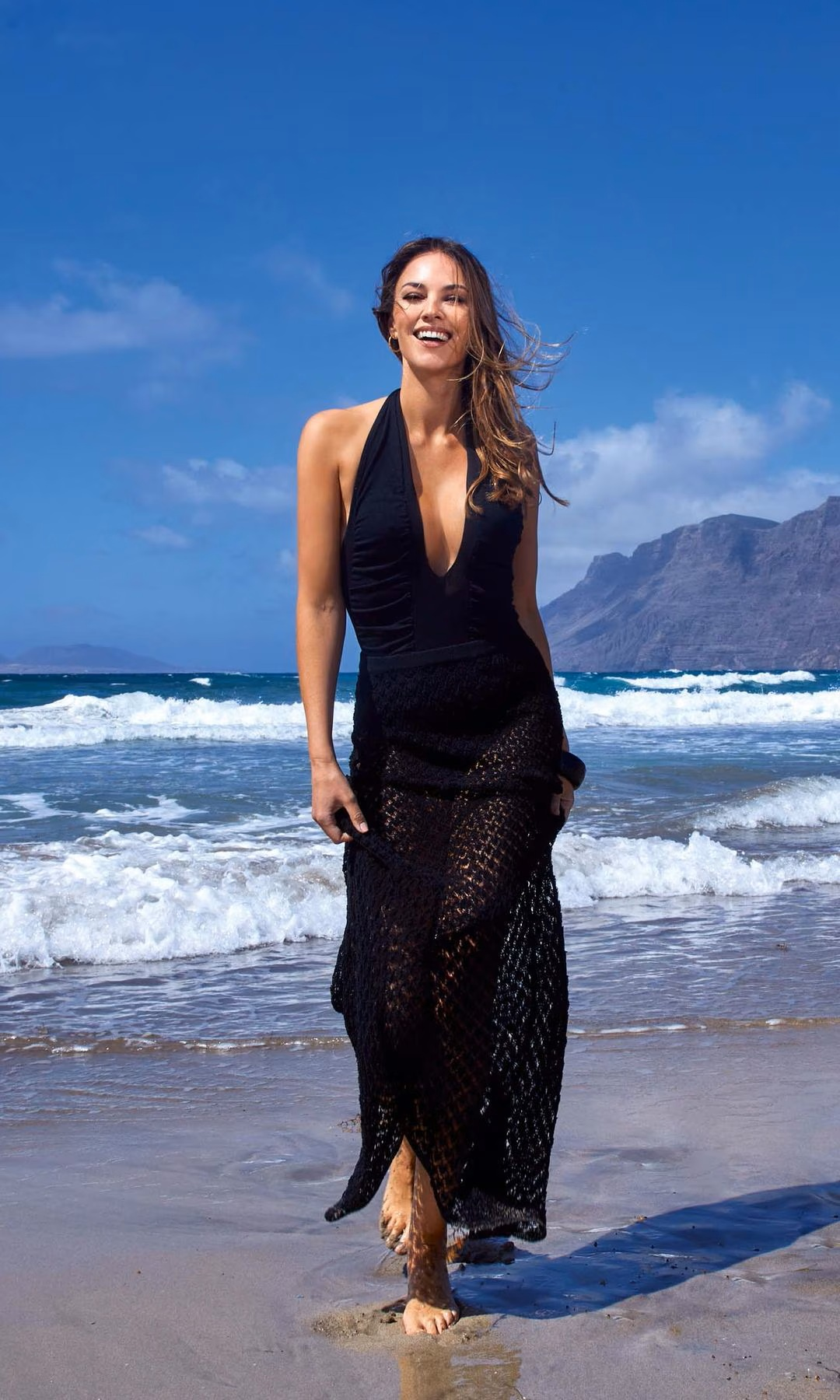
- Helen on the beach in Lanzarote, Canary Islands
- Born: 17 August 1981 (age 44); Girona, Catalonia, Spain
- Occupation: Model
- Height: 175 cm (5 ft 9 in)
- Title: Miss Spain 2000
- Spouse: Rudy Fernández (m. 2015)
- Website: helenlindes.com

Helen Lindes Griffiths (born 17 August 1981) is a Spanish actress, model and beauty pageant title holder who was crowned Miss Spain 2000 and placed 2nd Runner-up to Lara Dutta of India in the Miss Universe 2000 contest.

== Sources ==
- Lindes bio page
- article on Lindes

Awards and achievements
Preceded by (Puerto Rico) Brenda Liz Lopez	Miss Photogenic Universe; 2000	Succeeded by (Puerto Rico) Denise Quiñones
Preceded by (Spain) Diana Nogueira	Miss Universe 2nd Runner-Up; 2000	Succeeded by (United States) Kandace Krueger
Preceded by Lorena Bernal (Miss World Spain); Diana Nogueira (Miss Universe Spain)	Miss Spain; 2000	Succeeded by Eva Sisó
