= Miss Spain 2013 =

Miss Spain 2013 may refer to these events:

- Miss Universe Spain 2013, Miss Spain 2013 for Miss Universe 2013
- Miss World Spain 2013, Miss Spain 2013 for Miss World 2013
