= Miss World Spain 2015 =

3rd edition of the Miss World Spain pageant 2015

- Date: October 25, 2015
- Presenters: Luís Muñoz; Beatriz Jarrín
- Venue: Phillip VI Auditorium, Málaga, Spain
- Entrants: 25
- Placements: 10
- Withdrawals: Aragón; Cantabria; Galicia; Madrid
- Returns: Castile and León; Gerona; Granada; Lérida; Navarre
- Winner: Mireia Lalaguna Royo; Barcelona

Miss World Spain 2015 was the 3rd edition of the Miss World Spain pageant, held on October 25, 2015. The winner was Mireia Lalaguna Royo of Barcelona and she represented Spain in Miss World 2015.

== Results ==
=== Placements ===
Placement	Contestant
Miss World Spain 2015	Barcelona – Mireia Lalaguna
1st Runner-Up	Asturias – Ángela González
2nd Runner-Up	Balearic Islands – Natalia Ferrer
Top 10	Basque – Sarah Loinaz; Castile and León – Andrea Martínez; Córdoba – María Teresa Gálvez; Huelva – María José García; Málaga – María Ruiz; Melilla – Indira Estrada; Tarragona – Elisabeth Borne

=== Special awards ===
Award	Contestant
Miss Tourism	Balearic Islands – Natalia Ferrer
Social Media	Melilla – Indira Estrada
Social Project	Málaga – María Ruiz
Talent	Tarragona – Elisabeth Borne
Top Model	Basque – Sarah Loinaz

== Official Delegates ==
Province	Candidate	Age	Height
Alicante	Nerea Wall		178 cm (5 ft 10 in)
Asturias	Angela Gonzalez		173 cm (5 ft 8 in)
Balearic Islands	Natalia Ferrer		176 cm (5 ft 9.5 in)
Barcelona	Mireia Lalaguna Royo	23	177 cm (5 ft 9.5 in)
Basque	Sarah Loinaz		180 cm (5 ft 11 in)
Cádiz	Ángela Ponce Camacho	24	177 cm (5 ft 9.5 in)
Castellón	Laila Barzosa		175 cm (5 ft 9 in)
Castilla-La Mancha	Cristina Vicente		178 cm (5 ft 10 in)
Castile and León	Andrea Martínez Fernandez		175 cm (5 ft 9 in)
Córdoba	Maria Teresa Gálvez		176 cm (5 ft 9.5 in)
Extremadura	Irene Alfageme		174 cm (5 ft 8.5 in)
Gerona	Ruth Legido		171 cm (5 ft 7.5 in)
Granada	Pilar Seligman		173 cm (5 ft 8 in)
Huelva	María José García		177 cm (5 ft 9.5 in)
Jaén	Cristina Gil		178 cm (5 ft 10 in)
Las Palmas	Olivia Alonso		180 cm (5 ft 11 in)
Lérida	Yohenys Flores		172 cm (5 ft 7.5 in)
Málaga	María Ruiz		178 cm (5 ft 10 in)
Melilla	Indira Estrada		172 cm (5 ft 7.5 in)
Murcia	Carmen Pérez		180 cm (5 ft 11 in)
Navarre	Amaia Izar		175 cm (5 ft 9 in)
Sevilla	Claudia Moyano		177 cm (5 ft 9.5 in)
Tarragona	Elisabeth Borne		176 cm (5 ft 9.5 in)
Tenerife	Victoria Álvarez		174 cm (5 ft 8.5 in)
Valencia	Claudia Moras		176 cm (5 ft 9.5 in)

== Notes ==
=== Returns ===
Last competed in 2011:

- Castile and León
- Lérida
- Navarre

Last competed 2013:

- Gerona
- Granada

=== Withdrawals ===
- Aragón
- Cantabria
- Galicia
- Madrid

=== Did not compete ===
- Almería
- Araba
- Ávila
- Badajoz
- Burgos
- Cáceres
- Ciudad Real
- Cuenca
- Ceuta
- Guadalajara
- Guipúzcoa
- Huesca
- La Coruña
- La Rioja
- León
- Lugo
- Navarre
- Orense
- Pontevedra
- Salamanca
- Soria
- Teruel
- Toledo
- Valladolid
- Vizcaya
- Zamora
- Zaragoza
