= Miss Universe Spain 2018 =

Beauty pageant

- Date: June 29, 2018
- Presenters: Jorge Lucas; Harry Levi
- Entertainment: Ana Mena; Atacados
- Venue: August Auditorium, Palau Firal i de Congressos, Tarragona, Spain
- Broadcaster: Local Media TV
- Entrants: 20
- Placements: 6
- Winner: Ángela Ponce; Sevilla

Miss Universe Spain 2018 was the sixth Miss Universe Spain pageant, held at the August Auditorium, Palau Firal i de Congressos in Tarragona, Spain, on June 29, 2018.

Sofía del Prado of Castilla-La Mancha crowned Ángela Ponce of Sevilla as her successor at the end of the event. Ponce competed at the Miss Universe 2018 pageant, becoming the first trans woman to compete for the title.

== Results ==
=== Placements ===
| Placement | Contestant |
|---|---|
| Miss Universe Spain 2018 | Sevilla – Ángela Ponce |
| 1st Runner-Up | Madrid – Miriam Paredes Gines |
| 2nd Runner-Up | Madrid - Sheila Monjas |
| 3rd Runner-Up | Madrid - Raquel Arias Jimenez |
| 4th Runner-Up | Cantabria – Vanessa Fernández |
| 5th Runner-Up | Madrid – Andrea de las Heras |

== Candidates ==
20 contestants competed for the title of Miss Universe Spain 2018:

| # | Candidates | Age | Hometown | Province |
|---|---|---|---|---|
| 1 | Sheila Monjas | 21 | Madrid | Madrid |
| 2 | Miriam Paredes Gines | 24 | Madrid | Madrid |
| 3 | Daniela González Lorenzo | 17 | Tenerife | Tenerife |
| 4 | Romina Arias | 19 | Zaragoza | Zaragoza |
| 5 | Anakristina Rivero | 18 | Zaragoza | Zaragoza |
| 6 | Patricia Lamana | 20 | Madrid | Madrid |
| 7 | Mireia Cano | 24 | Barcelona | Barcelona |
| 8 | Noelia Roel | 27 | Galicia | Galicia |
| 9 | Aitana Jimenez | 18 | Tenerife | Tenerife |
| 10 | Vanesa Fernández | 21 | Cantabria | Cantabria |
| 11 | Paula Flores Pérez | 21 | Tenerife | Tenerife |
| 12 | Ariadna Cerrato Suarez | 21 | Tarragona | Tarragona |
| 13 | Raquel Arias Jimenez | 26 | Madrid | Madrid |
| 14 | Ana Fernández Córdoba | 24 | Seville | Sevilla |
| 15 | Magnolia Martinez | 19 | Alicante | Alicante |
| 16 | Mari Cayrols | 22 | Valencia | Valencia |
| 17 | Andrea de las Heras | 23 | Madrid | Madrid |
| 18 | Susana Sánchez | 25 | Salamanca | Salamanca |
| 19 | Paola López | 18 | Gran Canaria | Las Palmas |
| 20 | Ángela Ponce | 27 | Seville | Sevilla |
