= São Vicente do Sul =

Municipality of Rio Grande do Sul, Brazil

São Vicente - SP
- Municipality
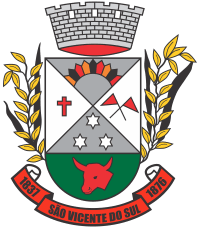
- Coat of arms

- Location within Rio Grande do Sul

- Location in Brazil
- Coordinates: 29°42′S 54°40′W
- Country: Brazil
- State: Rio Grande do Sul

Population (2022)
  - Total: 8,097
- Time zone: UTC−3 (BRT)

São Vicente do Sul is a municipality in the state of Rio Grande do Sul, Brazil.

== See also ==
- List of municipalities in Rio Grande do Sul
