= Elisabeth Reyes =

Spanish model and moderator (born 1985)

- Born: Elisabeth Reyes Villegas; 25 March 1985 (age 41); Málaga, Spain
- Height: 5'11, 180 cm
- Beauty pageant titleholder
- Title: Miss Spain 2006; Miss Málaga 2006
- Hair color: Brown
- Eye color: Green
- Major competitions: Miss Málaga; Miss Spain 2006 (winner); Miss Universe 2006 (unplaced)

Elisabeth Reyes Villegas (born 25 March 1985) is a Spanish model, moderator and beauty pageant titleholder.

== Biography ==
=== Model career ===
She won on 2 April 2006 the title as Miss Spain 2006. Reyes posed for catalogs of Ace & As and Blusens Teleno. Reyes portrayed her Miss Spain title at Salsa rosa, Tan a gustito, and the German magazine Gala.

=== Television career ===
Reyes moderated from 2008 to 2009 for Televisión Española. Reyes participated the Dancing show Mira quién Baila for the Spanish Television and came in third place with her partner.

=== Personal life ===
In 2008, Reyes was in a relationship with Spanish footballer Sergio Ramos and in June 2009 she dated Spanish footballer Alexis.

Awards and achievements
Preceded by Verónica Hidalgo	Miss Spain; 2006	Succeeded by Natalia Zabala
