= Susana Medina (model) =

Spanish model and beauty pageant titleholder

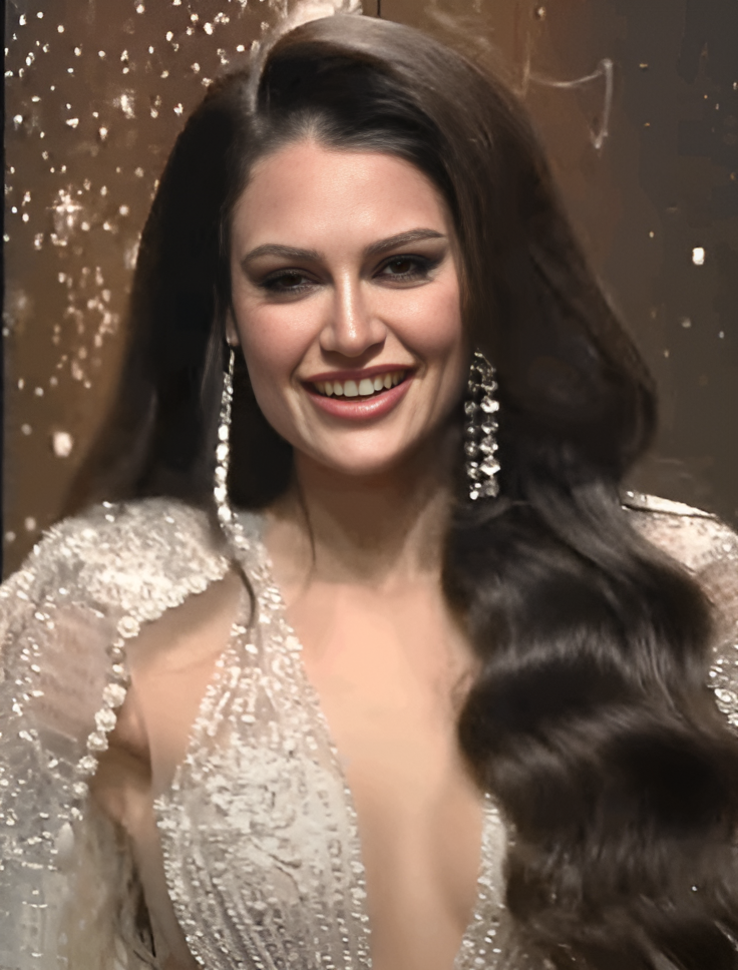
- Medina in 2024
- Born: Susana Lucía Medina Martín; Telde, Gran Canaria, Canary Islands, Spain
- Education: Harvard University
- Beauty pageant titleholder
- Title: Miss Universe Spain Canary Islands 2022; Miss Grand Las Palmas 2023; Miss Grand Spain 2024; Miss Universe Spain 2026
- Major competitions: Miss Universe Spain 2022; (3rd Runner-Up); Miss Grand Spain 2024; (Winner); Miss Grand International 2024; (3rd Runner-Up); Miss Universe Spain 2026; (Winner); Miss Universe 2026; (TBD)

Susana Medina is a Spanish model and beauty pageant titleholder who will represent Spain at Miss Universe 2026. She previously competed at Miss Grand International 2024, where she placed as the fifth runner-up and later assumed the title of third runner-up.

== Early life and education ==
Susana Medina is a native of La Garita, Telde, Spain.

She holds degrees in Law and Digital Marketing, as well as a master's degree from Harvard University.

In 2026, she was ranked 12th in the Palma Influencers category by Favikon.

== Pageantry ==
Medina won Miss Universe Spain Canary Islands 2022 and represented the Canary Islands at Miss Universe Spain 2022, where she placed third runner-up.

She won Miss Grand Las Palmas 2023 and went on to compete in and win Miss Grand Spain 2024. She represented Spain at Miss Grand International 2024, where she placed as the fifth runner-up. However, after several original titleholders resigned or were dethroned, she later assumed the title of third runner-up.

She won Miss Universe Spain 2026 and will represent Spain at Miss Universe 2026 in San Juan, Puerto Rico.

Awards and achievements
Preceded by Andrea Valero	Miss Universe Spain; 2026	Incumbent
Preceded by Celia Sevilla	Miss Grand Spain; 2024	Succeeded by Aitana Jiménez
