= Mireia Lalaguna =

Spanish model, actress, and beauty queen

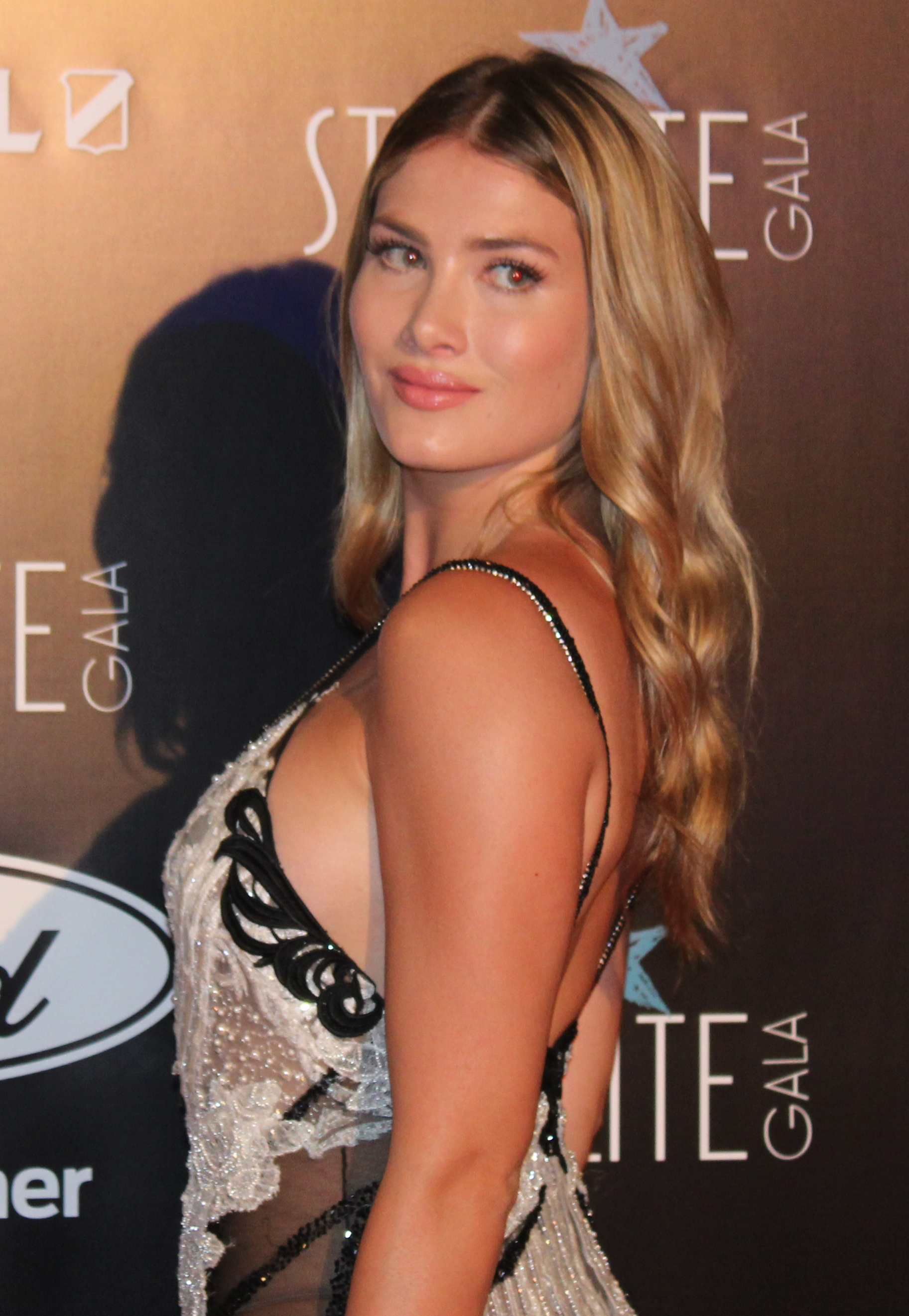
- Mireia Lalaguna at the Starlite Gala in 2019
- Born: Mireia Lalaguna Royo; 21 November 1992 (age 33); Barcelona, Catalonia, Spain
- Education: University of Barcelona
- Occupations: Model; actress
- Height: 1.77 m (5 ft 9 1/2 in)
- Beauty pageant titleholder
- Title: Miss Atlántico Internacional 2014; Miss World Spain 2015; Miss World 2015
- Hair color: Blonde
- Eye color: Blue
- Major competitions: Miss World Spain 2015 (Winner); Miss World 2015 (Winner)

Mireia Lalaguna Royo (born 21 November 1992) is a Spanish actress, model and beauty queen who was crowned Miss World 2015, becoming the first woman from Spain to win Miss World. She was previously crowned Miss World Spain 2015.

== Early life and education ==
Lalaguna was born in Barcelona on 21 November 1992. She obtained her bachelor's and master's degrees in pharmacy at the University of Barcelona in Spain. Lalaguna is fluent in Catalan, Spanish, French, and English.

== Career ==
Lalaguna ventured into pageantry in 2014. She represented Spain at the Miss Atlántico Internacional 2014 pageant, where she was eventually declared as the winner, crowned by outgoing titleholder Lorena Romaso.

=== Miss World Spain ===
Lalaguna competed at the third edition of Miss World Spain on 24 October 2015 in Málaga, representing Barcelona. At the end of the event, she was crowned Miss World Spain 2015 by her predecessor Lourdes Rodríguez of Castilla-La Mancha.

=== Miss World 2015 ===
Lalaguna represented Spain at Miss World 2015 pageant on 19 December 2015, held in Sanya, China. After advancing to the final five, she answered the question, "Why do you think you should win Miss World 2015?" with the following response:

I think I should be the next Miss World because I believe in strong women. Also, I always try to give my best. I believe in Beauty with a Purpose and I can continue its legacy. I want to show the world how to love and share, give the best of ourselves and show everyone how to find happiness in helping each other.

By the end of the event, Lalaguna was crowned Miss World 2015 by the outgoing titleholder Rolene Strauss of South Africa. Lalaguna's win marked the first time Spain won the Miss World competition, since the pageant's inception in 1951.

Awards and achievements
Preceded by (South Africa) Rolene Strauss	Miss World; 2015	Succeeded by (Puerto Rico) Stephanie Del Valle
Preceded by (Hungary) Edina Kulcsár	Miss World Europe; 2015	Succeeded by (Belgium) Lenty Frans
Preceded by (Bosnia and Herzegovina) Isidora Borovcanin	Miss World Top Model; 2015	Succeeded by (China) Jing Kong
Preceded by Lourdes Fernández	Miss World Spain; 2015	Succeeded by Raquel Tejedor
Preceded by (Uruguay) Loreno Romaso	Miss Atlántico Internacional; 2014	Succeeded by (Panama) Reyna Prescott
