= Sofia Mazagatos =

Spanish model, actress and TV presenter

- Born: Sofia Mazagatos; 5 October 1974 (age 51); Madrid, Spain
- Occupations: television host, model and actress
- Known for: Winner of Miss Spain 1991

Sofia Mazagatos (born October 5, 1974 in Madrid) is a Spanish model, actress and TV presenter who became a minor celebrity in Spain after being awarded with the Miss Spain title in 1991.

== Biography ==
Mazagatos became Miss Spain 1991 at the age of 17. She was described as having perfect measurements and a sweet smile. Her victory in the Miss Spain 1991 qualified her for Miss Europe 1991. She made it to the semi-finals of the competition.

She went on to become a model that collaborated with Giorgio Armani and later created her own modeling agency with her friend, Mar Flores.

She appeared as a presenter and host of different programs and later starred on the television shows, Desayuna con alegría and A mediodía, alegría. She later became the host of La tele es tuya, mate. She began her acting career in 2000 in a Spanish TV series called Paraíso and later appeared on Gloria Dance Academy, Arrayán and Obsesión.

She became a mother in 2015. She became pregnant again in 2018, but had a miscarriage.

== Appearance in films, television and the stage ==
=== Films ===
Films
Year	Title	Character	Type
2003	Quiero	Prostitute	Short film
2004	Las pasiones de sor Juana	Jimena	Leading role
2005	La maldición del pirata	Rachel	Leading role
2005	Despegue	Sofía	Short film
2009	The Sindone	Sofía	Supporting role

=== Television series ===
Television series
Year	Title	Character	Episodes
2000	Paraíso	Emma	1
2001	Academia de baile Gloria	Alba	10
2003	Desenlace	Model	1
2003 – 2004	Arrayán	Nuria Galán	90
2004	Diez en Ibiza	María	1
2005	Splunge [es]	Antonia	1
2005	Obsesión	Silvia	14
2007	Como el perro y el gato	Ana	1
2007	C.L.A. No somos ángeles	María	1
2009	Hermanos y detectives	Sofía	1

=== Television programmes ===
Television programmes
Year	Title	Channel	Role
1992	A mediodía, alegría	Telecinco	Presenter
1993	Desayuna con alegría	Telecinco	Presenter
1994	La tele es tuya, colega	Telecinco	Presenter
2006	El club de Flo	La Sexta	Contestant
2006	¿Cantas o qué?	Antena 3	Contestant

=== Theatre ===
Theatre
Year	Title	Role	Type
2001	Esmoquin [es]	Gabriela	Leading role
