= Athenea Pérez =

Spanish beauty pageant titleholder (born 1996)

- Born: Athenea Pérez Nsué Anaya; Murcia, Spain
- Height: 1.77 m (5 ft 10 in)
- Beauty pageant titleholder
- Title: Miss Universe Spain 2023
- Major competitions: Miss Universe Spain 2019; (1st Runner-Up); Miss Universe Spain 2023; (Winner); Miss Universe 2023; (Top 10); (Miss Congeniality)

Athenea Pérez Nsué is a Spanish beauty pageant titleholder who was crowned Miss Universe Spain 2023. She represented her country at Miss Universe 2023 and finished in the Top 10 semifinalist.

== Early life ==
=== Family background ===
Pérez was born to a Spanish father and an Equatorial Guinean mother. She is of Fang and Bubi descent on her maternal side. At the age of 4, she began practicing rhythmic gymnastics. Regarding her mixed race, Pérez has stated, "as for something public, I think it's the first time I've been attacked because of my skin color. And I think it's not because they didn't want to attack me before, but that the reason is in social media. They are part of our daily lives and before, they simply existed, but they were a complement and not an extension of us. Now it's easier to give your opinion and hide your hand."

As an Equatorial Guinean descent on her mother's side and Muline's on her father's side, Pérez will be the first representative of racialized Spain, which led her to face some racist insults on social networks. "I'm very sad. I was shocked. I've lived here all my life. I was born here. I'm from Churra and half muleña because of my father. It strikes me that this is happening in a society with so many cultures, which for me means wealth. I love my city and I'm proud to be from Murcia," she after being crowned Miss Universe Spain.

=== Education ===
Pérez graduated in Marketing and Advertising.

== Pageantry ==
Pérez first participated in the Miss World Spain competition when she was 17and was unplaced. On 2 July 2023, she wrote: Her victory makes her the eleventh representative of Miss Universe Spain in the history of the pageant, the only Spanish winner in 1974, Amparo Muñoz, and Carla Barber.

At 17 years old, I introduced myself to Miss World Spain. I didn't rank, but I knew I would achieve something big one day. Ten years later, I was crowned Miss Universe Spain 2023. Life makes it clear that dreams do come true. What is for you will come. That if you put your heart to something, it will come true. Together we will do something great. Together we will go for the next crown.

=== Miss Universe 2023 ===
Pérez represented Spain at Miss Universe 2023, held in El Salvador, on 18 November 2023. Pérez reached the top 10, and won the Miss Congeniality award . Pérez became the first woman of black descent to represent the Spain at Miss Universe.

Awards and achievements
Preceded by Alicia Lisette Faubel de Correa	Miss Universe Spain; 2023	Succeeded by Michelle Jiménez
