= Miss Spain 2007 =

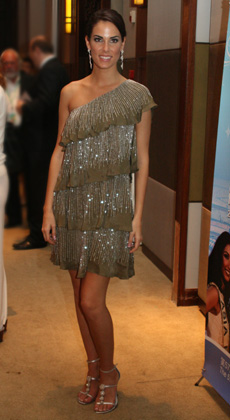
- Miss Spain 2007, Natalia Zabala
- Date: March 25, 2007
- Presenters: Silvia Jato and Gisela Sebastián
- Venue: Marina d'Or
- Broadcaster: Telecinco
- Entrants: 52
- Placements: 20
- Winner: Natalia Zabala; Gipuzkoa

Miss Spain 2007 (Spanish:Miss España 2007) was the 50th edition of the beauty pageant Miss Spain. The pageant was held in a tent in Marina d'Or, Oropesa del Mar, Spain on Sunday, March 25, 2007. There were 52 contestants representing each provinces of Spain.

Natalia Zabala from Gipuzkoa won the competition and represented Spain in Miss World 2007 and Miss Universe 2007.

The first runner up represented Spain in Miss International 2007 and the second runner up represented Spain in Miss Europe 2007. The rest of the Top 6 was represented Spain in Miss Globe International 2007, Miss Intercontinental 2007 and Miss Model of the World 2007

== Information ==
The event was held in a tent in the Marina d'Or complex. The event lasted for over 3 hours. There were live performances by Operación Triunfo contestant, Soraya, El Arrebato, Melendi and Operación Triunfo contestant, Mai Meneses. The show was watched by over 2,738,000 viewers.

Natalia Zabala, a 23-year-old law student was crowned Miss Spain 2007 with 59 points. The 2006 Miss Spain winner, Elisabeth Reyes, awarded her the sash and crown. Adriana Reveron, a 22 year old architecture student, was the runner up with 52 points. Nerea Arce, a 19 year old Business Administration student, came in 3rd place with 50 points.

The event featured tributes throughout the show commemorating the contest's 40-year history. The contest had 3 rounds.

== Judges ==
- Javier de Montini (Journalist)
- Cecilia Bolocco (Miss Universe 1987)
- Javier Elorrieta (Film Director)
- Sonsoles Artigas (Miss Spain 1987)
- Juan Carlos de la Iglesia (Magazine Director)
- Mariasela Álvarez (Miss World 1982)
- Valerio Pino (Catwalk Choreographer)
- María Lafuente (Designer)
- Pascuale Caprile (Photographer)
- Angels Pongilupi (Casting Director)
- Juan Ricard (Marina D'Or Clinical Center Director)
- Sonia Forcada (Marina D'Or Clinical Center Public Relations)

== Controversies ==
Ángela Bustillo, the winner of the Miss Cantabria contest, was disqualified from the event for having a child. This was due to the rules stating that all candidates were not allowed to be pregnant or have had children. Soledad Murillo, the General Secretary for Government Equality Policies asked the Miss Spain Organization to change this rule. The Miss Spain Organization agreed to change the rule.
