= Natalia Zabala =

Spanish beauty pageant titleholder (born 1983)

- Zabala in 2007
- Born: Natalia Zabala Arroyo; 10 May 1983 (age 43); San Sebastián, Spain
- Height: 1.77 m (5 ft 10 in)
- Beauty pageant titleholder
- Title: Miss Spain 2007

Natalia Zabala Arroyo (born 10 May 1983) is a Spanish beauty pageant titleholder who was crowned Miss Spain 2007.

== Biography ==
Zabala was born in San Sebastián to father José Antonio and mother María. Her mother was crowned Miss Burgos in the 1970s. Zabala studied law at university before being crowned Miss Spain 2007 at the age of 24. She represented Spain at Miss World 2007 and Miss Universe 2007, and later moved to Madrid. She made a cameo appearance on the Basque soap opera Goenkale in 2008.

As of 2024, she lives in London.

Awards and achievements
Preceded by Elisabeth Reyes	Miss Spain; 2007	Succeeded by Patricia Rodríguez
