= Vania Millán =

Spanish model

- Born: 5 February 1978 (age 48); Almería, Spain
- Height: 5 ft 10 in (1.78 m)
- Beauty pageant titleholder
- Title: Miss Spain 2002
- Hair color: Black
- Eye color: Brown

Vania Millán (born February 5, 1978, in Almería) is a Spanish model who won the 2002 Miss Spain beauty pageant and competed in Miss Universe 2002.

== Information ==
Vania Millán was tired of studying in college and was encouraged by her friends to try beauty pageants. She had an unusual situation where she was selected to compete in Miss Universe 2002 pageant after 2001 Miss Spain winner Lorena Ayala cut ties with the Miss Spain organization. It was said that she could copy Amparo Muñoz, who had entered the Miss Spain competition as the defending Miss Universe champion, however, she finished outside of the Top 10 in the competition.

She represented her hometown of Almería in the Miss Spain 2002 pageant, where she was victorious. She was 24 when she won it, which made her one of the oldest winners and created more controversy.

After the Miss Spain competition, her newly found fame helped her secure a spot in the 2003 season of the reality show, Survivor Spain. She finished 5th in the competition. She then appeared on the covers of the magazines FHM España and Interviú and appeared in multiple fashion shows and advertisements. She had an affair with soccer player, Cristiano Ronaldo in 2004. She later joined Teseo Comunicacion as a designer.

She returned to the spotlight in 2004, after marrying René Ramos, who is the brother of soccer player, Sergio Ramos and was the teammate of former lover, Cristiano Ronaldo. The couple divorced in 2016 and she later remarried in 2022.

In 2023, she competed on the game show, Pasapalabra. She announced her pregnancy in March 2023 after multiple struggles.
