= Miss Universe Spain 2019 =

- Date: September 18, 2019
- Presenters: Juan Pablo Carpintero; Elena de José
- Venue: Capital Theater, Madrid, Spain
- Entrants: 18
- Placements: 9
- Withdrawals: Cantabria; Galicia; Salamanca; Valencia; Zaragoza
- Winner: Natalie Ortega Tafjord; Barcelona

Miss Universe Spain 2019 was the seventh edition of the Miss Universe Spain pageant, held on September 18, 2019. The winner was Natalie Ortega Tafjord of Barcelona and she represented Spain in Miss Universe 2019. This was the first and only edition under the Jorge Diez Vanila directorship of the Be Miss Organization. The following year they dissociated themselves from the Miss Universe franchise in Spain. The license then goes to the Nuestra Belleza España Organization after this.

== Results ==
=== Placements ===
Placement	Contestant
Miss Universe Spain 2019	Barcelona – Natalie Ortega Tafjord
1st Runner-Up	Murcia – Athenea Pérez
2nd Runner-Up	Barcelona – Claudia Coba
Top 9	Alicante – María José Mínguez; Balearic Islands – Karina Valero; Madrid – Alicia Martínez; Madrid – Keyla González; Sevilla – Desirée Brampton; Tenerife – Sara San Mantín

=== Special awards ===
Award	Contestant
Miss Attitude	Murcia – Athenea Pérez
Miss Elegance	Granada – Violeta Toloba
Miss Figure	Ceuta – Mariam Ghalmi
Miss Sonrisa Smile Studio	Barcelona – Claudia Coba

== Official Delegates ==
Province	Candidate	Age	Height
Albacete	Ada Inmaculada Quintana	22	
Alicante	María José Mínguez Pérez	26	176 cm (5 ft 9 in)
Balearic Islands	Karina Valero Tieles	23	173 cm (5 ft 8 in)
Barcelona	Claudia Coba Sánchez	22	184 cm (6 ft 0 in)
Barcelona	Natalie Ortega Tafjord	19	180 cm (5 ft 11 in)
Barcelona	Samira de los Ángeles Boutros Khouri	20	170 cm (5 ft 7 in)
Ceuta	Mariam Quintana Ghalmi	26	176 cm (5 ft 9 in)
Granada	Violeta Toloba	20	176 cm (5 ft 9 in)
Las Palmas	Aitana Expósito González	18	
Madrid	Aitana Bouza Bari	19	180 cm (5 ft 11 in)
Madrid	Alicia Martínez	24	
Madrid	Keyla González	18	182 cm (6 ft 0 in)
Murcia	Andrea López	20	182 cm (6 ft 0 in)
Murcia	Athenea Pérez Nsué	22	180 cm (5 ft 10 in)
Murcia	Carmen Pérez	23	
Sevilla	María Desirée Brampton Rodríguez	20	183 cm (6 ft 0 in)
Tarragona	Anna Carolina Aznar Salvadó	25	172 cm (5 ft 8 in)
Tenerife	Sara San Mantín	26	180 cm (5 ft 11 in)
