= Miss Universe Spain 2022 =

Beauty pageant

- Date: September 10, 2022
- Entrants: 22
- Placements: 6
- Winner: Alicia Faubel; Valencia

Miss Universe Spain 2022 was the 10th edition of the Miss Universe Spain pageant. Sarah Loinaz of País Vasco crowned Alicia Faubel of Valencia at the end of the pageant. Faubel represented Spain at the Miss Universe 2022 pageant and made the top 16.

== Results ==
=== Placements ===
Placement	Contestant
Miss Universe Spain 2022	Valencia – Alicia Faubel
1st Runner-Up	Navarra – Laura Etayo
2nd Runner-Up	Andalucía – Alexandra Cucu
3rd Runner-Up	Canary Islands – Susana Medina
4th Runner-Up	Cataluña – Paula Ortega
5th Runner-Up	Galicia – Noemí Sartal

== Contestants ==
22 contestants competed for the title.

Represented	Contestant	Age	Height	Hometown	Placement
Andalucía	María Alexandra Cucu Eder-Funar	28	1.80 m (5 ft 11 in)	Málaga	2nd Runner-Up
Aragón	Carmen Bello Zangroniz	25	1.75 m (5 ft 9 in)	Zaragoza	
Asturias	Cátherine Aimée Peláez del Rivero	19	1.77 m (5 ft 10 in)	Gijón	
Baleares	Nadia Ioanna San Romá Valentín	28	1.73 m (5 ft 8 in)	Vilanova i la Geltru	
Cantabria	Elisa del Mar García Valle del Río	21	1.75 m (5 ft 9 in)	Polanco	
Castilla–La Mancha	Lidia Fernanda Brihuega Sánchez	21	1.71 m (5 ft 7 in)	Toledo	
Castilla-León	Sthephany Pérez Oropeza	27	1.74 m (5 ft 9 in)	Zamora	
Cataluña	Paula Ortega Madarieta	27	1.78 m (5 ft 10 in)	Barcelona	4th Runner-Up & Miss Social Media
Ceuta	María de la Asunción Barbour del Cid	19	1.83 m (6 ft 0 in)	Ceuta	
Ciudad Capital	Ada del Carmen Sosa de la Gándara	20	1.79 m (5 ft 10 in)	Madrid	
Comunidad Extranjero	Yúdith Amelia Reyes Hidalgo	20	1.80 m (5 ft 11 in)	Los Ángeles	
Extremadura	Elízabeth Margarita Pérez Franco	18	1.85 m (6 ft 1 in)	Mérida	
Galicia	Noemí del Pilar Sartal Fernández	24	1.78 m (5 ft 10 in)	Pontevedra	5th Runner-Up
Islas Soberanas	María del Lourdes Núñez dos Piñeiros	18	1.83 m (6 ft 0 in)	Madrid	
La Rioja	Ednyller Isabella García Leopardi	22	1.70 m (5 ft 7 in)	Logroño	
Las Canarias	Susana Lucía Medina Martín	23	1.81 m (5 ft 11 in)	Telde	3rd Runner-Up
Madrid	Celia Vicedo Cabeza de Vaca	25	1.74 m (5 ft 9 in)	Madrid	
Melilla	Ana Belén Santa María Taveras	26	1.83 m (6 ft 0 in)	Melilla	
Murcia	Arianna Victoria Rausseo Káushnick	19	1.75 m (5 ft 9 in)	Cartagena	
Navarra	Laura Sofía Etayo Sánchez	27	1.80 m (5 ft 11 in)	Pamplona	1st Runner-Up
País Vasco	Aída Miguelina Romero Rivas	26	1.73 m (5 ft 8 in)	Donostia-San Sebastián	
Valenciana	Alicia Lisette Faubel de Correa	25	1.78 m (5 ft 10 in)	Alicante	Miss Universe Spain 2022
