= Miss Universe Spain 2020 =

Beauty pageant

- Date: November 21, 2020
- Venue: Los Olivos Beach Resort, Costa Adeje, Tenerife, Canary Islands, Spain
- Entrants: 17
- Placements: 10
- Winner: Andrea Martínez; León

Miss Universe Spain 2020 was the eighth edition of the Miss Universe Spain pageant. This was the first edition of Miss Universe Spain under the Nuestra Belleza España Organization which franchised the Miss Universe license after the Be Miss Organization dissociated itself with the Miss Universe franchise in Spain. Sofía del Prado, Miss Universe Spain 2017 crowned Andrea Martínez of León at the end of the event. Martínez represented Spain in Miss Universe 2020.

== Results ==
=== Placements ===
Placement	Contestant
Miss Universe Spain 2020	León – Andrea Martínez
1st Runner-Up	Madrid – Andrea de las Heras
2nd Runner-Up	Málaga – Ainhoa Portillo
3rd Runner-Up	Granada – Angie Benavides
4th Runner-Up	Almería – Oriana Correia
Top 10	Cáceres – Pilar Magro; Granada – Carmen Cerillo; Girona – Laura Mora; Madrid – Coral Cortés; Madrid – Maria del Castíllo

== Candidates ==
No.	Province	Candidate	Age	Height	Placement
1	Alicante	Isabel Prieto Martínez	22	1.78 m (5 ft 10 in)	
2	Madrid	Andrea de las Heras	25	1.80 m (5 ft 11 in)	1st Runner-Up
3	Cáceres	Pilar Magro Nogales	25	1.80 m (5 ft 11 in)	Top 10
4	Salamanca	Nuria Montejo	20	1.80 m (5 ft 11 in)	
5	Almería	Oriana Estefania Correia Gomis	19	1.76 m (5 ft 9 1/2 in)	4th Runner-Up
6	Almería	Lucía Abascal	24	1.80 m (5 ft 11 in)	
7	Granada	Carmen Cerillo	24	1.84 m (6 ft 1/2 in)	Top 10
8	Madrid	Elisa Fernández Castreño	27	1.80 m (5 ft 11 in)	
9	Madrid	Maria del Castíllo Yanes	19	1.78 m (5 ft 10 in)	
11	León	Andrea Martínez Fernandez	27	1.75 m (5 ft 9 in)	Miss Universe Spain 2020
12	Málaga	Ainhoa Portillo	19	1.80 m (5 ft 11 in)	2nd Runner-Up
13	Barcelona	Paola Grau Suma	24	1.80 m (5 ft 11 in)	
14	Granada	Angie Benavides Castillo	24	1.80 m (5 ft 11 in)	3rd Runner-Up
15	Gerona	Laura Mora Oviedo	23	1.76 m (5 ft 9 1/2 in)	Top 10
16	Madrid	Coral Cortés	22	1.76 m (5 ft 9 1/2 in)	Top 10
17	Madrid	Nairovys Velo Cogles	25	1.80 m (5 ft 11 in)	
