= Miss Universe Spain 2016 =

Beauty pageant

- Date: 5 December 2016
- Presenters: Luís Muñoz and Beatriz Jarrín
- Entertainment: Jesús de Manuel; Tenosaya
- Venue: Teatro Barceló, Madrid, Spain
- Entrants: 17
- Placements: 6
- Winner: Noelia Freire; Ciudad Real

Miss Universe Spain 2016 was the fourth edition of the Miss Universe Spain beauty contest. It was held on December 5, 2016, at the Barceló Theater in the city of Madrid. Sofía del Prado, second runner-up of Miss Spain Universe 2015 and winner of Reina Hispanoamericana 2015, crowned Noelia Freire Benito as Miss Spain Universe 2016, which will represent Spain in the Miss Universe 2016 contest.

== Results ==
=== Placements ===
| Results | Candidates |
|---|---|
| Miss Universe Spain 2016 | Ciudad Real - Noelia Freire Benito |
| 1st Runner-Up | Bizkaia - Ainara Cardaño Cadavieco |
| 2nd Runner-Up | Valladolid - Alba Fernández García |
| Top 6 | Málaga - María Isabel Martín Fuster; Valencia - María José Mínguez Pérez; Córdoba - Patricia de Dios Rodríguez |

== Special awards ==
| Results | Candidates |
|---|---|
| Miss Congeniality | Canary Islands - Celina Dominguez Sánchez |

== Candidates ==
Seventeen candidates competed in the contest. The contestants are:

| Candidates | Hometown |
|---|---|
| Ainara Cardaño Cadavieco | Bilbao |
| Alba Fernández García | Valladolid |
| Alba Victoria González Velázquez | Málaga |
| Amabel Martinez Banegas | Madrid |
| Amèrica Yomaira De Luna Pichardo | Madrid |
| Carolina Barroso Pérez | Tenerife |
| Celina Dominguez Sánchez | Canarias |
| Conchi Santiago Durán | Málaga |
| Eider Zumeta García | San Sebastián |
| Laura Silgo Carrasco | Guadalajara |
| María Isabel Martín Fuster | Málaga |
| María José Mínguez Pérez | Orihuela |
| Mónica Aguado Mier | Oviedo |
| Neus Mira Jovells | Valencia |
| Noelia Freire Benito | Ciudad Real |
| Patricia de Dios Rodríguez | Córdoba |
| Sara Hernández Sutglar | Las Palmas |
