= Miss Europe 2018 =

International beauty pageant

- Date: 10 November 2018
- Venue: Eiffel Tower, Paris, France
- Winner: Anna Shornikova and Anastasiya Ammosova; Ukraine and Russia

Miss Europe 2018 was the 61st edition of the Miss Europe pageant and was the third under the Miss Europe Organization. held in the Eiffel Tower in Paris, France on 10 November 2018. Anastasiya Ammosova of Russia & Anna Shornikova of Ukraine, were both crowned Miss Europe 2018 by out going titleholder Diana Kubasova of Latvia. The Miss Europe 2018 title holders were two winners from two separate countries. For the first time in pageant's 90-year history, the title is divided between two countries: Anastasia Ammosova from Russia and Anna Shornikova from Ukraine. The 1st runner up is Nika Kar from Slovenia and the 2nd runner up is Agatha Maksimova from France.

== Results ==
=== Placements ===
Placement	Contestant
Miss Europe 2018	Ukraine – Anna Shornikova
Miss Europe 2018	Russia – Anastasiya Ammosova
1st Runner-Up	Slovenia – Nika Kar
2nd Runner-Up	France – Agatha Maksimova

== Contestants ==
- France – Agatha Maksimova
- Greece – Freideriki Memmou
- Italy – Giada María Gucchetti
- Norway – Sandra Hellen Olson
- Portugal – Carolina Luiza Mariela Oliveira Da Ferraz
- Russia – Anastasiya Ammosova
- Slovenia – Nika Kar
- Spain – Eugenia Gómez Rovira
- Ukraine – Anna Shornikova
