= Miss Universe Spain 2021 =

Beauty pageant

- Date: 16 October 2021
- Venue: Lagos de Fañabé Beach Resort, Costa Adeje, Tenerife, Canary Islands
- Entrants: 13
- Placements: 6
- Winner: Sarah Loinaz; Guipúzcoa

Miss Universe Spain 2021 was the ninth edition of the Miss Universe Spain pageant. Andrea Martínez of León crowned Sarah Loinaz of Guipúzcoa at the end of the pageant. Loinaz represented Spain at the Miss Universe 2021 pageant in Israel, and unplaced.

== Results ==
=== Placements ===
Placement	Contestant
Miss Universe Spain 2021	Guipúzcoa – Sarah Loinaz
1st Runner-Up	Madrid – Teresa Calleja
2nd Runner-Up	Málaga – Carmen Serrano
Top 6	Alicante – Gema Torres; Alicante – Juliette Slama; Tenerife – Yanira Morales

== Candidates ==
The contestants competed for the title of Miss Universe Spain 2021.

Autonomous Community	Candidate	Age	Hometown	Placement
Alicante	Gema Torres Borras	27	Bellreguard	Top 6
Alicante	Juliette Slama	24	Xàbia	Top 6
Asturias	Fabianna Concepción Antequera Molvinni	23	Corvera de Asturias	
Cádiz	Mila Ogalla Toledo	27	Puerto Real	
Guipúzcoa	Sarah Loinaz Marjaní	23	Donostia-San Sebastián	Miss Universe Spain 2021
Las Palmas	Keyla Suárez Mederos	20	Las Palmas	
Madrid	Luiseli Estefania Sanchez Mercado	26	Madrid	
Madrid	Imane Ghziel	21	Madrid	
Madrid	Teresa Calleja Palazuelo	23	Madrid	1st Runner-Up
Málaga	Carmen Serrano Porras	24	Málaga	2nd Runner-Up
Sevilla	Elena María Navarro Falcón	25	Sevilla	
Tenerife	Yanira Morales Plasencia	19	Arona	Top 6
Valencia	Araceli Bazán Castillo	25	Valencia	
