= Miss Europe 1936 =

International beauty pageant

- Date: October 30, 1936
- Venue: Tunis, Tunisia
- Entrants: 15
- Debuts: Caucasus region, Morocco, Sweden and Syria-Lebanon
- Withdrawals: Czechoslovakia, Danube, Denmark and Rhenanie (Saar Region)
- Returns: Ireland
- Winner: Antoñita Arquès; Spanish Republic

Miss Europe 1936 was the ninth annual Miss Europe pageant and the eighth edition under French journalist Maurice de Waleffe. New delegates came from Syria-Lebanon, Morocco, Caucasus region, Sweden and Tunisia, withdraws from Czechoslovakia, Danube, Denmark and Rhenanie (Saar Region).

== Results ==
=== Placements ===
Placement	Contestant
Miss Europe 1936	Spain – Antonita Arquès

== Delegates ==
- Belgium – Laure Torfs
- (Russia) (Georgia (country)) (Armenia) (Azerbaijan) Caucasus Region (in exile) – Tatiana Ouchakoff
- England – Laurence Atkins
- France – Lyne Lassalle
- Greece – Neila Sikiari
- Holland – Mia Kramer
- Hungary – Maria Nagy
- Ireland – Dany O'Moore
- Morocco – Aimée Gervais
- Norway – Aslaug Simensen
- Russia (in exile) – Ariane Gedeonova
- Spanish Republic – Antonia Arquès
- Sweden – Birgit Engquist
- (Second Syrian Republic) (Greater Lebanon) Syria-Lebanon – UNKNOWN
- Tunisia – Ethel Azzopardi
