= Miss World Spain 2014 =

2nd edition of Miss World Spain pageant 2014

- Date: September 13, 2014
- Presenters: Luís Muñoz
- Venue: Pepe Falomir Almela Amphitheater, Castellón, Spain
- Entrants: 23
- Placements: 8
- Withdrawals: Catalonia; Granada
- Returns: Asturias; Barcelona; Cádiz; Cantabria; Jaén
- Winner: Lourdes Rodríguez; Castilla-La Mancha

Miss World Spain 2014 was the 2nd edition of the Miss World Spain pageant, held on September 13, 2014. The winner was Lourdes Rodríguez of Castilla-La Mancha and she represented Spain in Miss World 2014.

== Results ==
=== Placements ===
Placement	Contestant
Miss World Spain 2014	Castilla-La Mancha – Lourdes Rodríguez
1st Runner-Up	Las Palmas – Lorea González
2nd Runner-Up	Alicante – Estefanía Martínez
Top 8	Cádiz – María Sevilla; Extremadura – Mariona Elías; Madrid – Celia Vallespir; Málaga – Adriana Sánchez; Sevilla – Rocío García

=== Special awards ===
Award	Contestant
Miss Tourism	Alicante – Estefanía Martínez
Social Media	Asturias – María García
Social Project	Castilla-La Mancha – Lourdes Rodríguez
Sympathy	Asturias – María García
Talent	Las Palmas – Lorea González
Top Model	Tenerife – Constanza Márquez

== Official delegates ==
Province	Candidate	Age	Height
Alicante	Stephanie Martinez	18	179 cm (5 ft 10.5 in)
Aragón	Pilar Soler	18	183 cm (6 ft 0 in)
Asturias	Maria Garcia	19	170 cm (5 ft 7 in)
Balearic Islands	Laura Estarellas	19	177 cm (5 ft 9.5 in)
Barcelona	Sabela Álvarez	19	177 cm (5 ft 9.5 in)
Basque	Zuriñe Letamendi	17	177 cm (5 ft 9.5 in)
Cádiz	Mary Seville	21	181 cm (5 ft 11.5 in)
Cantabria	Débora Ríos	22	174 cm (5 ft 8.5 in)
Castellón	Monica Osorio	17	175 cm (5 ft 9 in)
Castilla-La Mancha	Lourdes Rodríguez	20	175 cm (5 ft 9 in)
Córdoba	Patricia de Dios	21	176 cm (5 ft 9.5 in)
Extremadura	Mariona Elias	22	174 cm (5 ft 7.5 in)
Galicia	Raquel Vilariño	22	177 cm (5 ft 9.5 in)
Huelva	Haizea Delgado	19	181 cm (5 ft 11.5 in)
Jaén	Cristina García	20	172 cm (5 ft 8 in)
Las Palmas	Lorea Gonzalez	24	164 cm (5 ft 4.5 in)
Madrid	Celia Vallespir	22	180 cm (5 ft 11 in)
Málaga	Adriana Sánchez	23	182 cm (5 ft 11.5 in)
Melilla	Marta Castellanos	21	177 cm (5 ft 9.5 in)
Murcia	Ana Ibáñez	17	178 cm (5 ft 10 in)
Sevilla	Rocío García	16	180 cm (5 ft 11 in)
Tenerife	Constance Marquez	19	177 cm (5 ft 9.5 in)
Valencia	Cecilia Bellido	17	173 cm (5 ft 8 in)

== Notes ==
=== Returns ===
Last competed in 2011:

- Asturias
- Barcelona
- Cádiz
- Cantabria
- Jaén

=== Withdrawals ===
- Catalonia
- Granada

=== Did not compete ===
- Almería
- Araba
- Ávila
- Badajoz
- Burgos
- Cáceres
- Castile and León
- Ciudad Real
- Cuenca
- Ceuta
- Gerona
- Guadalajara
- Guipúzcoa
- Huesca
- La Coruña
- La Rioja
- León
- Lérida
- Lugo
- Navarre
- Orense
- Pontevedra
- Salamanca
- Soria
- Tarragona
- Teruel
- Toledo
- Valladolid
- Vizcaya
- Zamora
- Zaragoza
