= Miss Europe 2019 =

International beauty pageant

- Date: 17 May 2019
- Venue: Hotel Martinez, Cannes, France
- Entrants: 5
- Placements: 5
- Winner: Andrea de las Heras; Spain

Miss Europe 2019 was the 62nd edition of the Miss Europe pageant and the fourth under the Miss Europe Organization. It was held at Hotel Martinez in Cannes, France, on 17 May 2019. Andrea de las Heras of Spain was crowned Miss Europe 2019 by outgoing titleholders Anastasiya Ammosova of Russia and Anna Shornikova of Ukraine. The pageant took place during the Cannes Film Festival in Cannes, France.

== Results ==
=== Placements ===
Placement	Contestant
Miss Europe 2019	Spain – Andrea de las Heras
1st Runner-Up	Greece – Julia Alexandratou
2nd Runner-Up	Latvia – Linda Novica
3rd Runner-Up	France – Tauany Aparecida Coelho Machado
4th Runner-Up	Estonia – Karolina Dobrihina

== Contestants ==
- Estonia – Karolina Dobrihina
- France – Tauany Aparecida Coelho Machado
- Greece – Julia Alexandratou
- Latvia – Linda Novica
- Spain – Andrea de las Heras
