= Miss World Spain 2013 =

- Date: June 23, 2013
- Presenters: Daniel Montesdeoca; Silvia de Esteban
- Venue: Lago Martiánez, Tenerife, Spain; Hotel Turquesa, Tenerife, Spain
- Entrants: 20
- Placements: 7
- Withdrawals: Almería; Araba; Asturias; Ávila; Badajoz; Barcelona; Burgos; Cáceres; Cádiz; Cantabria; Castile and León; Ciudad Real; Cuenca; Ceuta; Gerona; Guadalajara; Guipúzcoa; Huesca; Jaén; La Coruña; La Rioja; León; Lérida; Lugo; Navarre; Orense; Pontevedra; Salamanca; Soria; Tarragona; Teruel; Toledo; Valladolid; Vizcaya; Zamora; Zaragoza
- Winner: Elena Ibarbia Jiménez; Basque

Miss World Spain 2013 was the very 1st edition of the Miss World Spain pageant, held on June 23, 2013. The winner was Elena Ibarbia Jiménez of Basque and she represented Spain in Miss World 2013.

== Results ==
=== Placements ===
Placement	Contestant
Miss World Spain 2013	Basque – Elena Ibarbia Jiménez
1st Runner-Up	Madrid – Inés Baquera
2nd Runner-Up	Málaga – Cristina Mesa
3rd Runner-Up	Valencia – Sheila Purroy
4th Runner-Up	Sevilla – Tamara Llagas
5th Runner-Up	Aragón – Raquel Ruíz
6th Runner-Up	Balearic Islands – Paula BM

=== Special awards ===
Award	Contestant
Social Media	Extremadura – Ana Hernández
Social Project	Sevilla – Tamara Llagas

== Official Delegates ==
Province	Candidate	Age	Height
Alicante	Marta Martinez	20	180 cm (5 ft 11 in)
Aragón	Raquel Ruíz	18	181 cm (5 ft 11 in)
Balearic Islands	Paula BM	21	172 cm (5 ft 8 in)
Basque	Elena Ibarbia Jiménez	18	180 cm (5 ft 11 in)
Castellón	Tania Ayuso	21	174 cm (5 ft 8.5 in)
Castilla-La Mancha	Noelia Freire	19	176 cm (5 ft 9 in)
Catalonia	María Marín	23	175 cm (5 ft 9 in)
Córdoba	Blanca Jiménez	24	180 cm (5 ft 11 in)
Extremadura	Ana Hernández	21	174 cm (5 ft 7.5 in)
Galicia	Melissa Arias	23	170 cm (5 ft 7 in)
Granada	Isabel López	23	176 cm (5 ft 9 in)
Huelva	Rocío Parreño	23	178 cm (5 ft 10 in)
Las Palmas	Esther Pérez	23	172 cm (5 ft 8 in)
Madrid	Inés Baquera	21	176 cm (5 ft 9 in)
Málaga	Cristina Mesa	18	179 cm (5 ft 10.5 in)
Melilla	Paula Solorzano	19	175 cm (5 ft 9 in)
Murcia	Athenea Pérez	18	176 cm (5 ft 9 in)
Sevilla	Tamara Llagas	24	164 cm (5 ft 4.5 in)
Tenerife	Sirelis Corujo	22	176 cm (5 ft 9 in)
Valencia	Sheila Purroy	21	176 cm (5 ft 9 in)

== Notes ==
=== Withdrawals ===
- Almería
- Araba
- Asturias
- Ávila
- Badajoz
- Barcelona
- Burgos
- Cáceres
- Cádiz
- Cantabria
- Castile and León
- Ciudad Real
- Cuenca
- Ceuta
- Gerona
- Guadalajara
- Guipúzcoa
- Huesca
- Jaén
- La Coruña
- La Rioja
- León
- Lérida
- Lugo
- Navarre
- Orense
- Pontevedra
- Salamanca
- Soria
- Tarragona
- Teruel
- Toledo
- Valladolid
- Vizcaya
- Zamora
- Zaragoza
