= Ángela Ponce =

Spanish model (born 1991)

- Born: Ángel Maria Ponce Camacho; 18 January 1991 (age 35); Seville, Spain
- Height: 5 ft 11 in (1.80 m)
- Beauty pageant titleholder
- Title: Miss World Cádiz 2015; Miss Universe Spain 2018
- Hair color: Dirty Blond
- Eye color: Light Blue
- Major competitions: Miss World Cádiz 2015 (Winner); Miss World Spain 2015 (Unplaced); Miss Universe Spain 2018 (Winner); Miss Universe 2018 (Unplaced)

Ángela María Ponce Camacho (born 18 January 1991) is a Spanish model and beauty pageant titleholder who won Miss Universe Spain 2018. Ponce made history on 29 June 2018 as the first openly transgender woman to be crowned Miss Spain. She represented her country at Miss Universe 2018 as the first openly transgender contestant competing for the title. She did not advance to the finals.

== Career ==
Ponce entered and won the Miss World Cádiz 2015 title. Since she won that title, she represented Cádiz in Miss World Spain 2015. At that pageant, she was unplaced. On 29 June 2018, she competed at the Miss Universe Spain 2018 pageant and won the title, becoming the first openly transgender woman to win the title. She represented Spain at the Miss Universe 2018 finals in Bangkok, won by Catriona Gray of the Philippines.

Awards and achievements
Preceded by María Sevilla	Miss World Cádiz; 2015	Succeeded by Sara López
Preceded by Sofía del Prado	Miss Spain Universe; 2018	Succeeded by Natalie Ortega
