= Agatha Maksimova =

Russian-French actress and fashion model

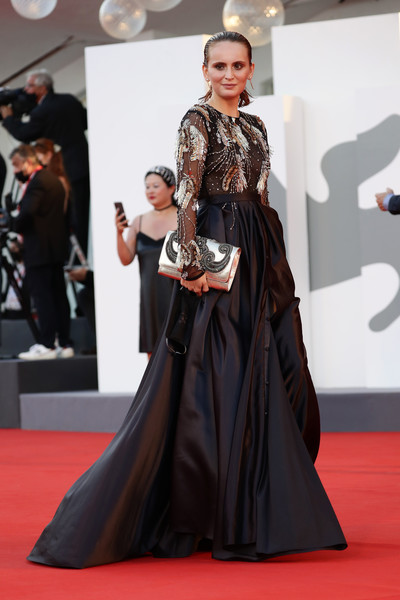
- Agatha Maksimova at 77th Venice Film Festival
- Born: 23 June 1993 (age 33); Moscow, Russia
- Occupations: Actor, model
- Years active: 2009 – present
- Height: 1.73 m (5 ft 8 in)

Agatha Maksimova (born 23 June 1993) is a Russian-French actress and model.

== Personal life ==
Agatha was born on 23 June 1993 in Moscow, Russia. She grew up in Moscow before settling at the age of 18 in Paris, France. She speaks English, French and Russian.

== Pageantry ==
=== Miss Europe 2018 ===
Agatha joined the contest Miss Europe France, where she was crowned as Miss Europe France 2018 and represented France at Miss Europe 2018 that was held on 10 November 2018 on the first floor of the Eiffel Tower in Paris where she finished as the 2nd Runner Up.

=== Miss Intercontinental 2018 ===
Agatha represented France at Miss Intercontinental 2018 which was held on 26 January 2019 at the Mall of Asia Arena in the Philippines. 87 delegates from different countries and territories competed for the beauty title.

== Modeling ==
At the age of fifteen she was quickly noticed by agencies and photographers around the world. She posed for such campaigns as Lanvin, Christian Louboutin, L'Oréal, Ralph Lauren, Garnier, Rick Owens, Louis Vuitton and appears on the pages of Vogue, Harper's Bazaar, White Sposa, Glamour, L'Officiel, Femina, Women's Health and others.

== Acting ==
She started her acting career at the end of 2019 with the famous acting coach Jack Waltzer (Los Angeles, USA). In July 2019, she starred in her first film Ataraxia directed by Maria Loche. In September 2020, together with Maxence Danet-Fauvel, Sabine Crossen, Axel Baille, and other honored actors she starred in The House of Gaunt movie directed by Joris Faucon Grimaud. She is regularly invited to the most prestigious film festivals including Cannes Film Festival and Venice Film Festival.

== Filmography ==
=== Film ===
Year	Title	Role	Notes
2020	Je Ne Reviendrai Pas	Lucy	Film debut
2020	Ataraxia	Hanna	Short film
2021	Les Lettres De L'Angoisse	Jana	
2021	Au Bout du Fil	Pauline	Short film
2021	L'autre Monde	Juliette	Short film
2021	The House of Gaunt	Lily Potter	Harry Potter prequel
2022	Effondrement	Dancer	
2023	JCQLMVS: Jusqu’à Ce Que La Mort Vous Sépare	Cynthia	Post-production
2023	Countdown	Ella	Official selection Nikon Film Festival
2023	Last Moment	Dancer	Short film
2023	Le Dernier Coup	Аssistant	Post-production
2024	Délicieuse Et Tragique	Catherine	Screenplay selected by La Maison des Scénaristess during the 72nd annual Cannes Film Festival

=== Television ===
Year	Title	Role	Notes
2021	Marlene	Receptionist	Web series
2021	HP	Doctor	OCS series
2023	Iboga Green	Annie	Télésud series

=== Music videos ===
Year	Title	Artist	Notes
2018	Tout se passe après minuit	Black M ft. Dadju	

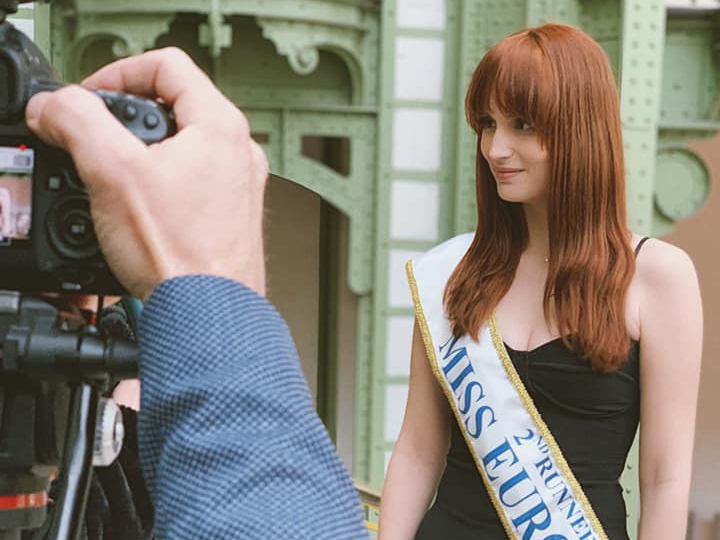
