= Andrea Martínez =

Spanish beauty pageant titleholder (born 1993)

- Born: Andrea Martínez Fernández; 23 June 1993 (age 33); León, Spain
- Height: 1.80 m (5 ft 11 in)
- Spouse: Kepa Arrizabalaga (m. 2023)
- Children: 2
- Beauty pageant titleholder
- Title: Miss Universe Spain 2020
- Years active: 2012–present

Andrea Martínez Fernández (born 23 June 1993) is a Spanish beauty pageant titleholder who was crowned Miss Universe Spain 2020.

== Biography ==
Martínez was born in León. In her youth, she was a basketball player. She attended Colegio Leonés, and studied business administration and management at university. In September 2020, she was crowned Miss Universe Spain 2020.

Martínez became engaged to Spanish footballer Kepa Arrizabalaga in 2022, and they married in 2023. They have twin daughters.

Awards and achievements
| Preceded by Natalie Ortega Tafjord | Miss Universe Spain; 2020 | Succeeded by Sarah Loinaz |
