= Miss Spain =

Beauty pageant

Miss España
- Formation: 1929; 97 years ago
- Purpose: Beauty pageant
- Headquarters: Los Realejos, Tenerife, Canary Islands
- Location: Spain
- Official language: Spanish
- National Directors: Cres del Olmo & Daniel Montesdeoca
- Affiliations: Miss Universe; Miss World; Miss International; Miss Europe
- Website: www.nuestrabellezaespana.com; www.missuniversespain.net

The Miss Spain (Spanish: Miss España) is a national beauty pageant in Spain that selects Spanish representatives to compete in three of the big four major international beauty pageants: the Miss Universe, Miss World, and Miss International competitions.

== History ==
Number of Wins under Miss España Organization (Miss Universe Spain & Miss World Spain)
Current franchises
| Pageant | Title | Winning year(s) |
|---|---|---|
| Miss Universe | 1 | 1974 |
| Miss World | 1 | 2015 |
| Miss International | 3 | 1977, 1990, 2008 |
| Miss Europe | 8 | 1935, 1936, 1962, 1967, 1970, 1974, 1985, 2019 |

=== Miss Spain: 1929–2011 ===
The origins of Miss Spain date back to 1929, when early contests took place until the advent of civil war in 1936, followed by the dictatorship of Francisco Franco, which did not permit beauty pageants until 1961.

The winner of Miss Spain is sent to represent her country in Miss Universe. However, if Miss Spain is underage, a runner-up is sent to Miss Universe. Overall in these international pageants, Spain's success has been moderate with one Miss Universe title in 1974 and three Miss International titles in 1977, 1990 and 2008.

=== Miss Universe Spain and Miss World Spain: 2013–present ===
After the inactivity of Miss Spain contest, the company Be Beautiful Spain, S.L. was created by Guillermo Escobar García, former worker of Miss Spain and who founded the contests Miss Spain Universe and Miss Spain World. In 2013, the pageant is separated into several pageants - like Miss World Spain and Miss Universe Spain. In the year 2018, after seven years of inactivity, the contest Miss Spain returns with Pedro Quesada as president and with Juncal Rivero as general director. The national director for Spain at Miss Universe, in 2019, is Jorge Diez Vanila. The national directors for Spain at both Miss World and Miss International are Cres del Olmo and Daniel Montesdeoca.

In 2020, the Be Miss Org. dissociated itself from the Miss Universe Organization. Later on, Cres del Olmo and Daniel Montesdeoca from the Nuestra Belleza España Organization franchise the Miss Universe license, in addition to the licenses for both Miss World and Miss International.

== Titleholders ==
The winner of Miss España represents her country at Miss Universe. On occasion, when the winner does not qualify (due to age) for either contest, a runner-up is sent. Sometimes, the winner can also compete at Miss World and Miss Europe if the winner will be available to compete by the Miss España Organization. However, Miss España Organization was claimed to bankrupt in 2012, and separated into several independent contests choosing the representatives in the International beauty pageants like Miss World Spain (Miss España Mundo) and Miss Universe Spain (Miss España Universo).

| Year | Miss España / Miss Spain | Autonomous Community | Notes |
|---|---|---|---|
| 1929 | Pepita Samper † | Valencia | |
| 1930 | Elena Pla † | Valencia | |
| 1931 | Ermelina Carreño † | Ciudad Real | |
| 1932 | Teresita Daniel | Barcelona | |
| 1933 | Emilia Docet | Pontevedra | |
| 1934 | María Eugenia Henríquez Girón | Madrid | |
| 1935 | Alicia Navarro | Tenerife | Miss Europe 1935 |
No competition held in 1936 - 1958
| 1959 | Salud Rubio Perez-Grueso | Toledo | |
| 1960 | Teresa Del Rio | Málaga | |
| 1961 | Carmen Cervera | Barcelona | |
| 1962 | Maruja García Nicolau | Islas Baleares | Miss Europe 1962 |
| 1963 | María Rosa Pérez | Tenerife | |
| 1964 | María José Ulla | Madrid | |
| 1965 | Alicia Borrás | Barcelona | |
| 1966 | Paquita Torres Pérez | Málaga | Miss Europe 1967 |
| 1967 | Paquita Delgado Sánchez | Córdoba | |
| 1968 | Amparo Rodrigo | Valencia | |
| 1969 | Noelia Afonso | Tenerife | Miss Europe 1970 |
| 1970 | Josefina Román | Cádiz | |
| 1971 | Maria del Carmen Muñoz | Madrid | |
| 1972 | Rocío Martín Madrigal | Sevilla | |
| 1973 | Amparo Muñoz | Málaga | Miss Universe 1974 |
| 1974 | Nelly Rodriguez | Tenerife | |
| 1975 | Olga Fernández Pérez | Pontevedra | |
| 1976 | Luz María Polegre Hernández | Tenerife | |
| 1977 | Guillermina Ruiz Doménech | Islas Baleares | |
| 1978 | Gloria María Valenciano | Las Palmas | |
| 1979 | María Dolores Forner Toro | Madrid | |
| 1980 | Francisca Ondiviela | Las Palmas | |
| 1981 | Cristina Pérez Cottrell | Málaga | |
| 1982 | Ana Isabel Herrero García | Teruel | |
| 1983 | Garbiñe Abasolo García | Vizcaya | |
| 1984 | Juncal Rivero Fadrique Castilla | Valladolid | Miss Europe 1985 |
| 1985 | Amparo Martínez Cerdán | Valencia | |
| 1986 | Remedios Cervantes Montoya | Málaga | |
| 1987 | Sonsoles Artigas Mederos | Las Palmas | |
| 1988 | Eva María Pedraza López | Córdoba | |
| 1989 | Raquel Revuelta Armengou | Sevilla | |
| 1990 | Esther Arroyo Bermúdez | Cádiz | |
| 1991 | Sofía Mazagatos Gómez | Madrid | |
| 1992 | Eugenia Santana Alba | Las Palmas | |
| 1993 | Raquel Rodríguez Hidalgo | Córdoba | |
No competition held in 1994
| 1995 | María Reyes Vázquez | Soria | |
| 1996 | María José Suárez Benítez | Sevilla | |
| 1997 | Inés Sáinz Esteban | Vizcaya | |
| 1998 | María José Besora Villanueva | Murcia | |
| 1999 | Lorena Bernal Pascual | Guipúzcoa | |
| 2000 | Helen Lindes | Las Palmas | |
| 2001 | Lorena Van Heerde Ayala^{[A]} | Alicante | |
| 2002 | Vania Millán Miras | Almería | |
| 2003 | Eva María González Fernández | Sevilla | |
| 2004 | María Jesús Ruiz Garzón | Jaén | |
| 2005 | Verónica Hidalgo | Gerona | |
| 2006 | Elisabeth Reyes Villegas | Málaga | |
| 2007 | Natalia Zabala Arroyo | Guipúzcoa | |
| 2008 | Patricia Yurena Rodríguez | Tenerife | |
| 2009 | Estíbaliz Pereira Rábade | A Coruña | |
| 2010 | Paula Guilló Sempere | Teruel | |
| 2011 | Andrea Huisgen | Barcelona | Last edition of Miss España |
| Year | Miss Universo España | Autonomous Community | Notes |
| 2013 | Patricia Yurena Rodríguez Alonso | Tenerife | Be Miss Organization — Guillermo Escobar García Directorship · (Ex) Miss España 2008 — New format to other contestants who never competed at Miss Universe allows to register Miss Universo España competition |
| 2014 | Desirée Cordero Ferrer | Seville | |
| 2015 | Carla Barber | Las Palmas | |
| 2016 | Noelia Freire Benito | Ciudad Real | |
| 2017 | Sofía del Prado Prieto | Albacete | |
| 2018 | Ángela Ponce Camacho | Seville | First transgender woman to win the Miss Universo España |
| 2019 | Natalie Ortega Tafjord | Barcelona | Be Miss Organization — Jorge Diez Vanila directorship · The 1st Miss Universo España who is of Spanish and Norwegian descents |
| 2020 | Andrea Martínez Fernández | León | Nuestra Belleza España Organization — Cres del Olmo and Daniel Montesdeoca directorship |
| 2021 | Sarah Loinaz Marjaní | Guipúzcoa | |
| 2022 | Alicia Lisette Faubel de Correa | Valencia | |
| 2023 | Athenea Paulinha Pérez Nsué | Murcia | |
| 2024 | Michelle Jiménez | Islas Baleares | |
| 2025 | Andrea Valero | A Coruña | |
| 2026 | Susana Lucía Medina Martín | Las Palmas | Miss Universe Spain Org. - Lina Poffet and Daniel Montesdeoca directorship |

^{A} Resigned
^{B} Took over title
^{C} Patricia Yurena Rodríguez originally won Miss Spain 2008 but due to age requirements was unable to compete at Miss Universe and was subsequently replaced by Claudia Moro. Rodríguez instead represented Spain at Miss World. Rodríguez later won Miss Universe Spain 2013 represented Spain at Miss Universe 2013.

=== Winners' gallery ===
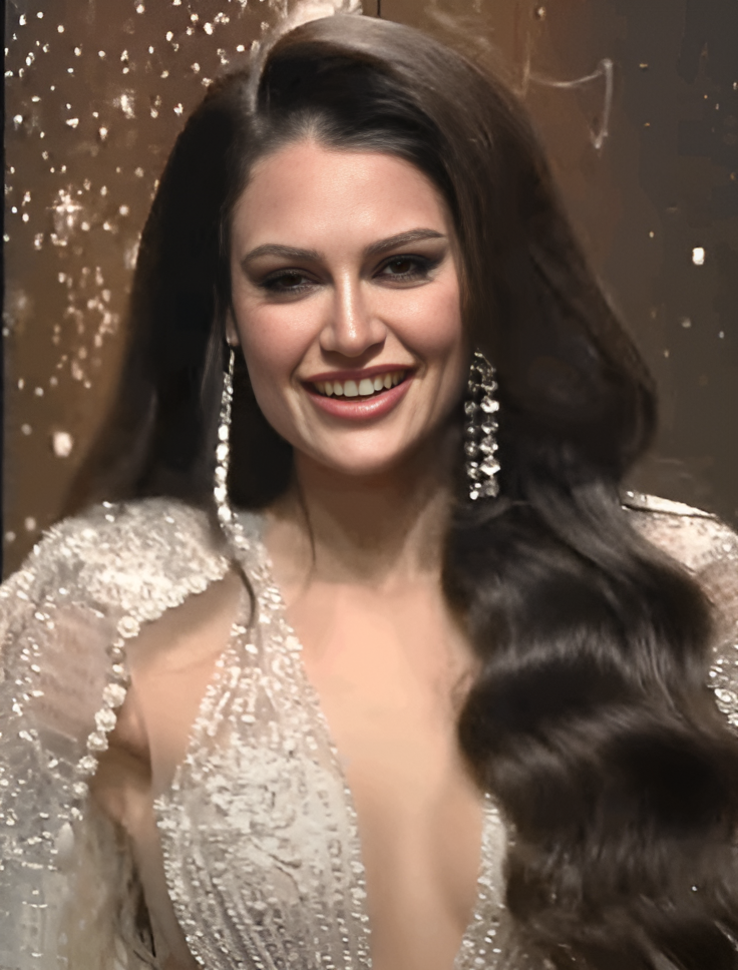
Susana Medina, Miss Universe Spain 2026

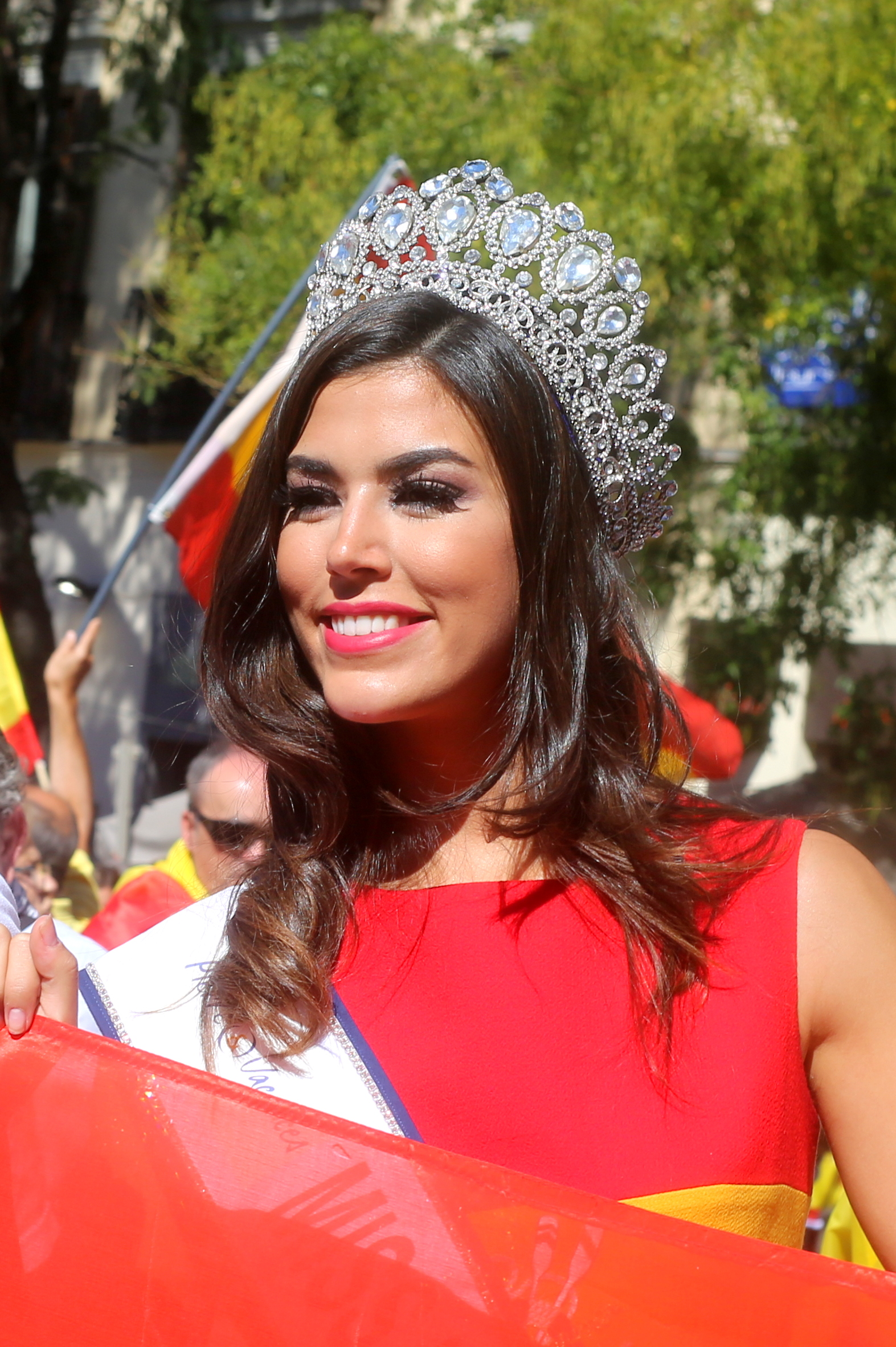
Sofía del Prado, Miss Universe Spain 2017

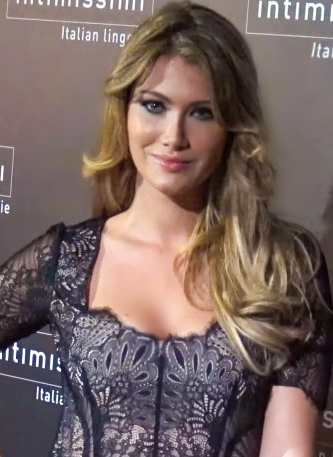
Mireia Lalaguna, Miss World Spain 2015 & Miss World 2015

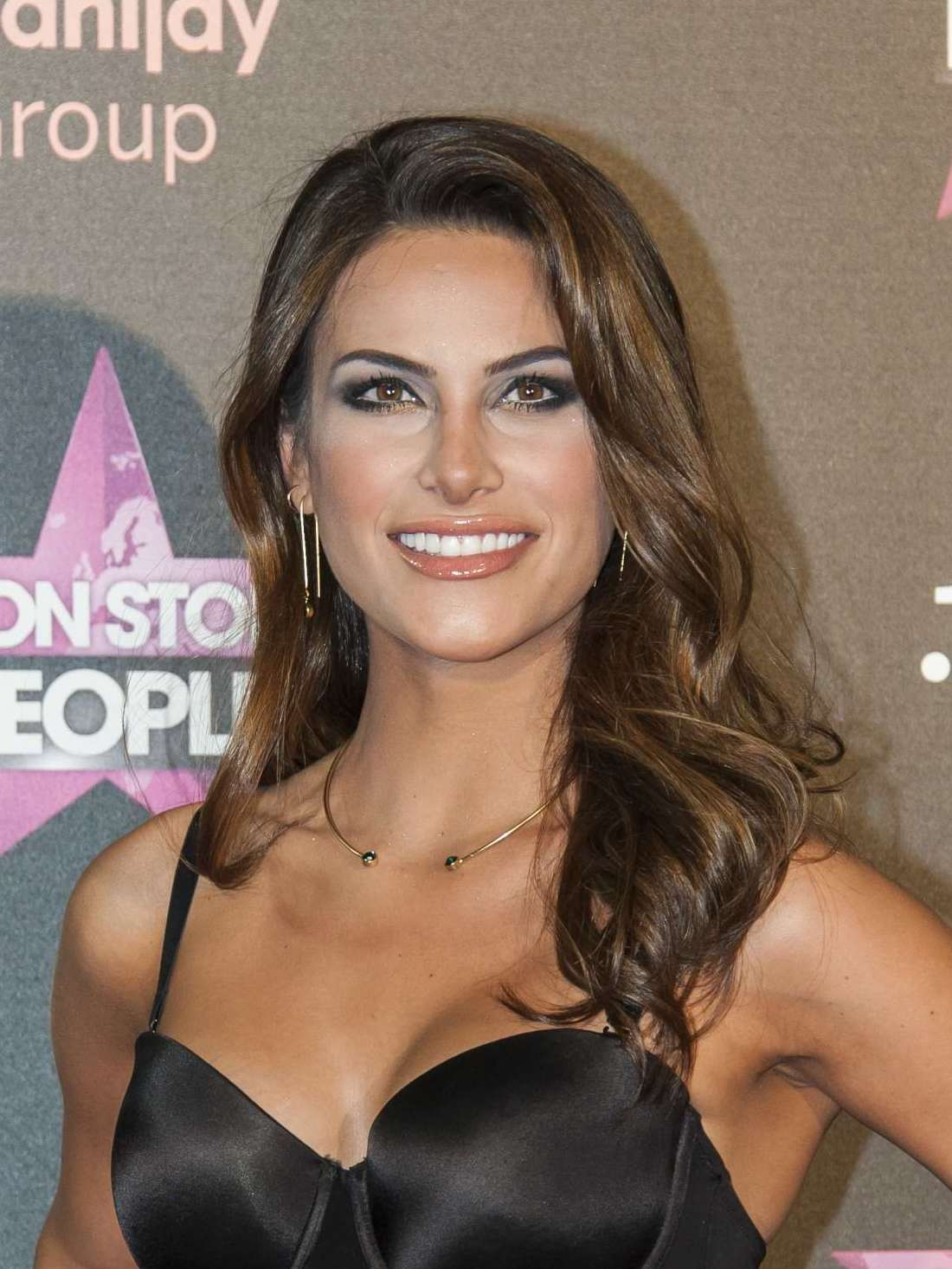
Carla Barber, Miss Universe Spain 2015 & Miss World Spain 2011

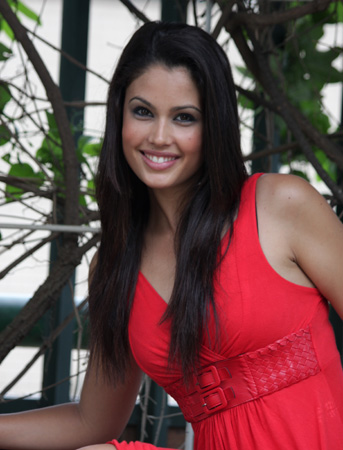
Patricia Yurena Rodríguez, Miss Universe Spain 2013 & Miss Spain 2008/Miss World Spain 2008

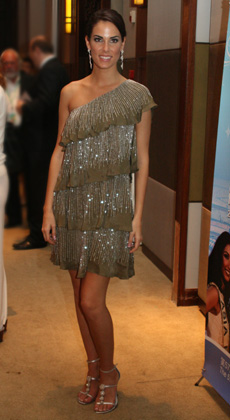
Natalia Zabala Arroyo, Miss Spain 2007

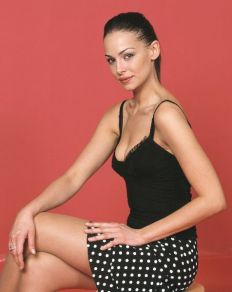
Eva González, Miss Spain 2003

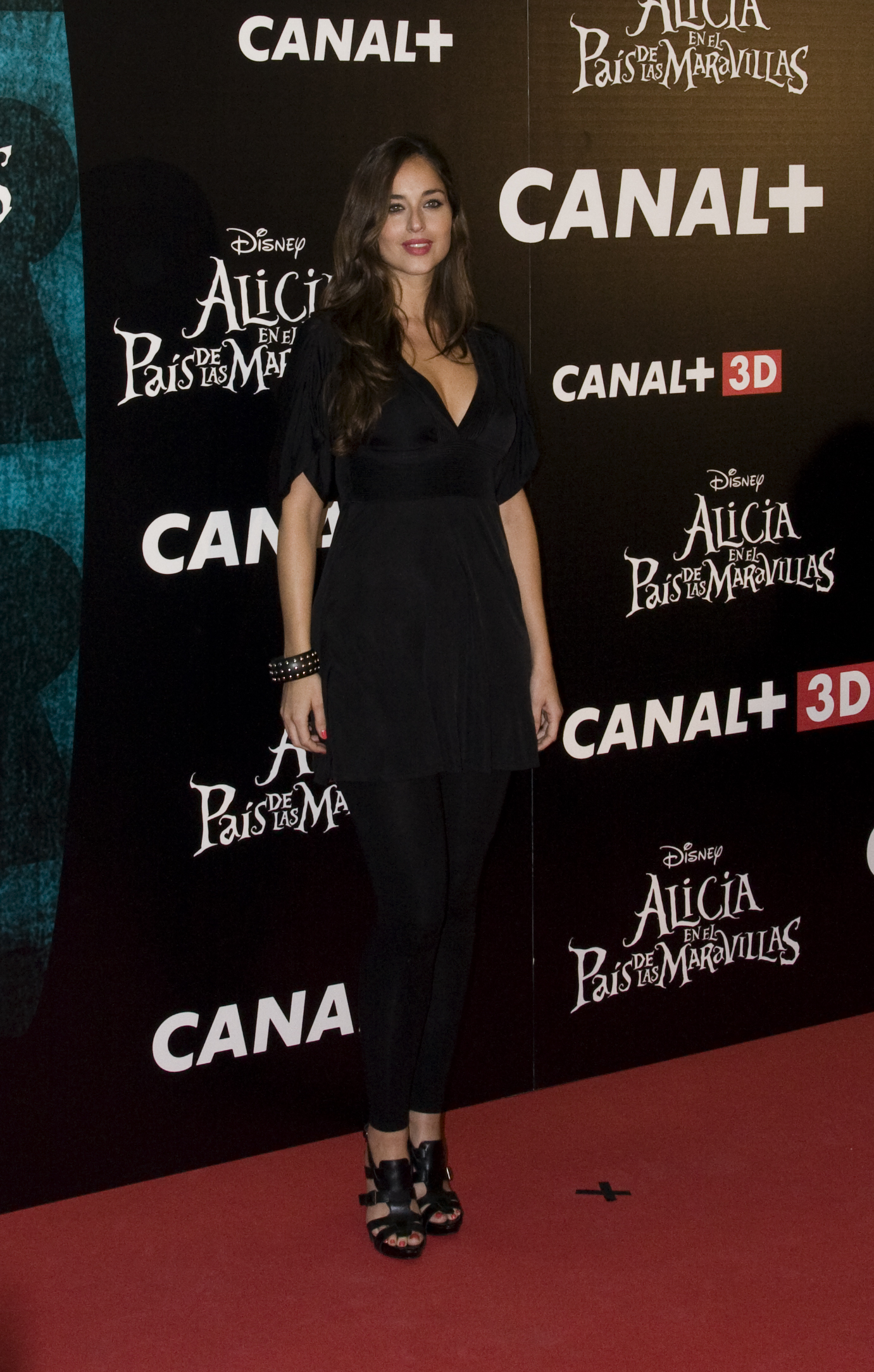
Lorena Van Heerde Ayala, Miss Spain 2001

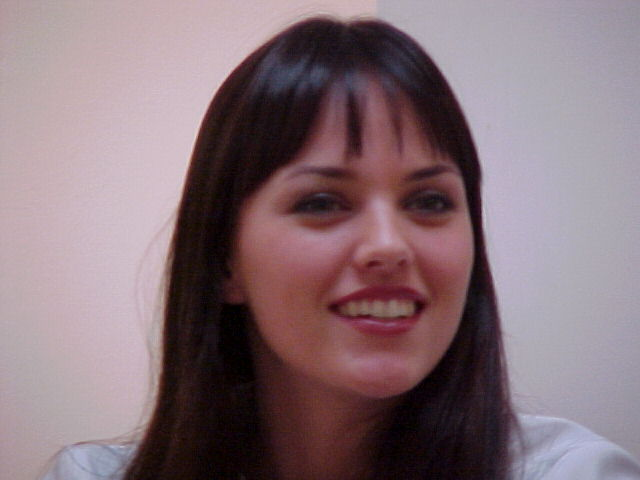
Helen Lindes, Miss Spain 2000

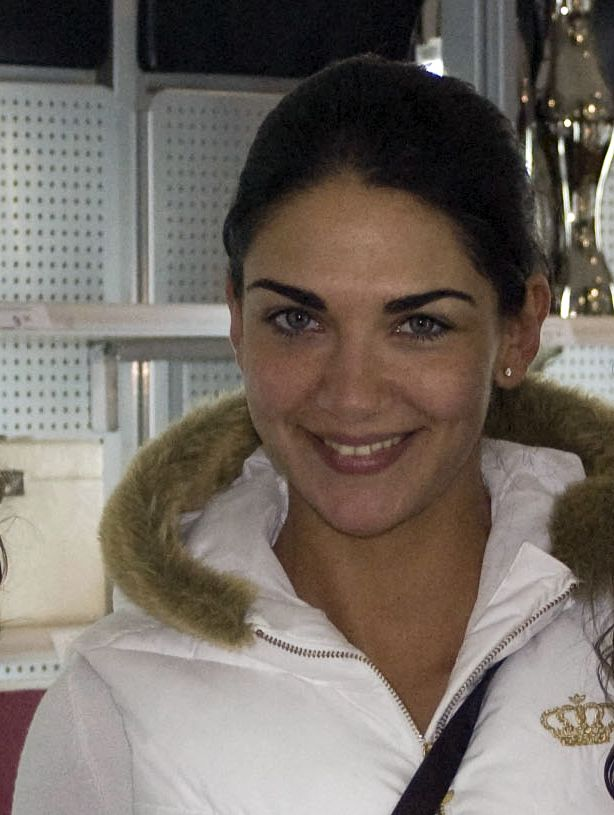
Lorena Bernal Pascual, Miss Spain 1999

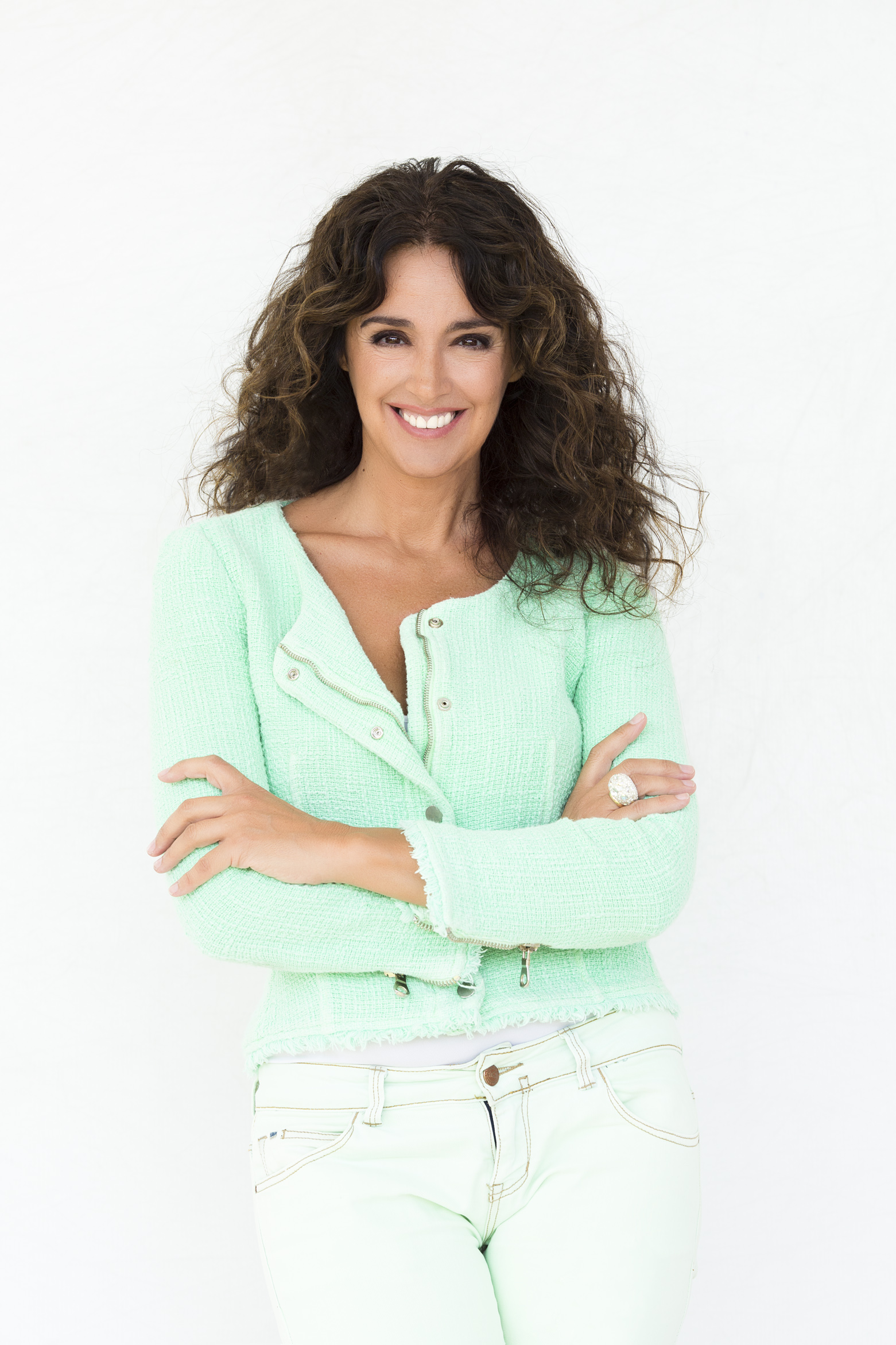
Garbiñe Abasolo, Miss Spain 1983

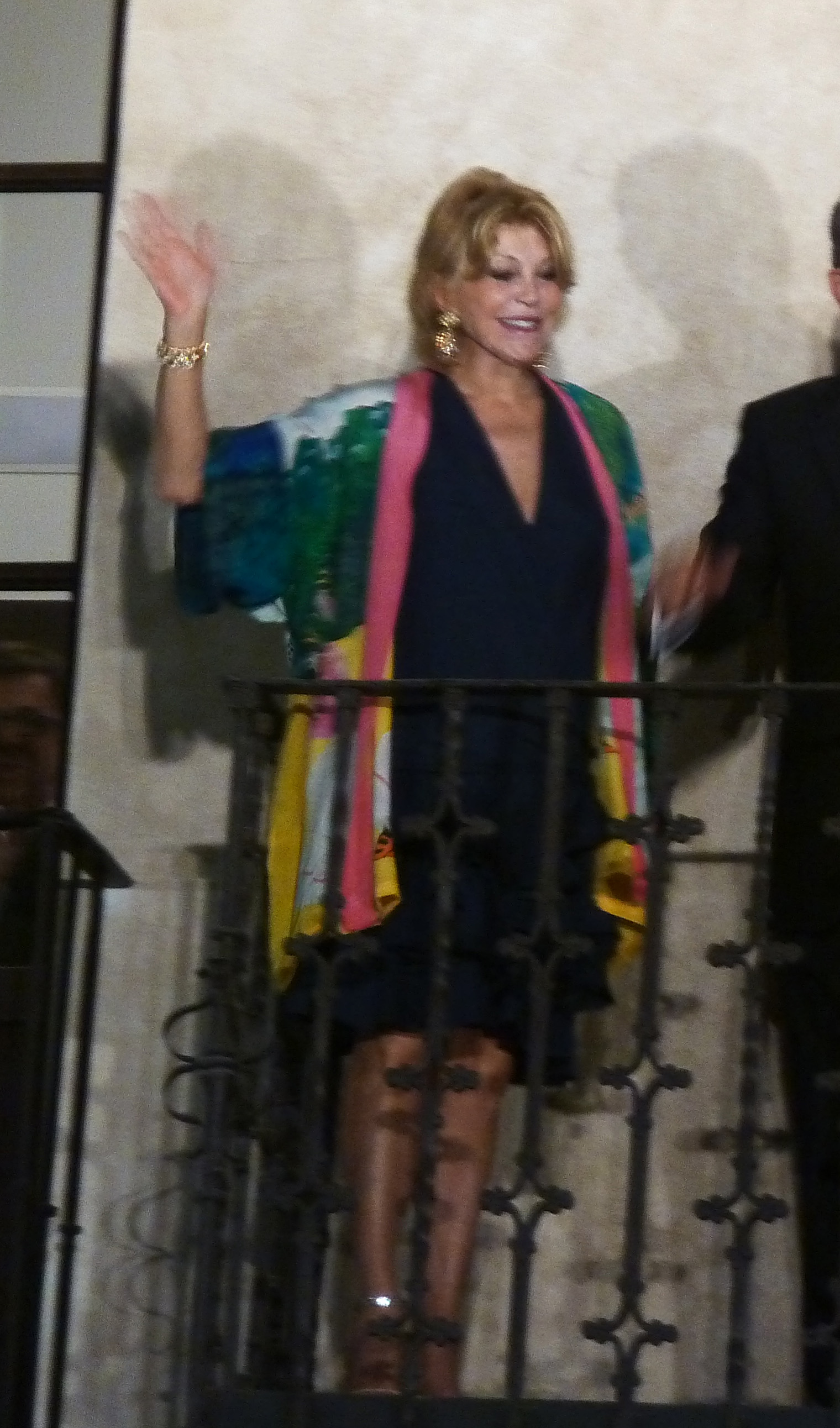
Carmen Cervera, Miss Spain 1961

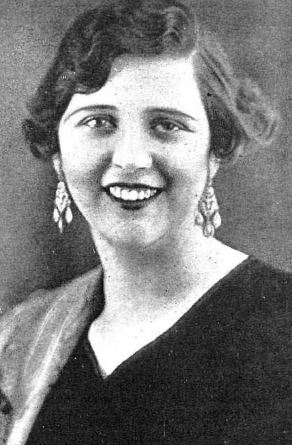
Pepita Samper, Miss Spain 1929

== Representatives under Miss España ==
=== Miss Universo España ===
- : Declared as Winner
- : Ended as runner-up or top 5/6 qualification
- : Ended as one of the finalists or semifinalists
- : Ended as special awards winner

From 1960-2012, the winner of Miss Spain represents her country at the Miss Universe. On occasion, when the winner does not qualify (due to age) for either contest, a runner-up is sent. In 2013, the BE MISS ORG. took over the franchise of Miss Universe and the winner of Be Miss Universo España participates at Miss Universe competition. Since 2020, the Nuestra Belleza España Organization handles the Miss Universe license.

| Year | Autonomous Community | Miss Universo España | Placement at Miss Universe | Special Awards |
|---|---|---|---|---|
| 2026 | Las Palmas | Susana Lucía Medina Martín | TBA | |
| 2025 | Galicia | Andrea Valero | Unplaced | |
| 2024 | Islas Baleares | Michelle Jiménez | Unplaced | |
| 2023 | Murcia | Athenea Paulinha Pérez Nsué | Top 10 | Miss Congeniality |
| 2022 | Valencia | Alicia Lisette Faubel de Correa | Top 16 | |
| 2021 | Guipúzcoa | Sarah Loinaz Marjaní | Unplaced | |
| 2020 | León | Andrea Martínez Fernández | Unplaced | |
Be Miss Universo España / Be Miss Universe Spain
| 2019 | Barcelona | Natalie Ortega Tafjord | Unplaced | |
| 2018 | Seville | Ángela Ponce Camacho | Unplaced | |
| 2017 | Albacete | Sofía del Prado Prieto | Top 10 | |
| 2016 | Ciudad Real | Noelia Freire Benito | Unplaced | |
| 2015 | Las Palmas | Carla Barber | Unplaced | |
| 2014 | Seville | Desirée Cordero Ferrer | Top 10 | |
| 2013 | Tenerife | Patricia Yurena Rodríguez Alonso | 1st Runner-up | |
Miss España / Miss Spain
| 2012 | Barcelona | Andrea Huisgen Serrano | Unplaced | |
| 2011 | Teruel | Paula Guilló Sempere | Unplaced | |
Miss Universe España — Casting by Miss España, after the Miss España 2010 postponed
| 2010 | Tenerife | Adriana Reverón Moreno | Unplaced | |
Spanish Representatives from Miss España/Miss Spain
| 2009 | A Coruña | Estíbaliz Pereira Rábade | Unplaced | |
| 2008 | Madrid | Claudia Moro Fernández | Top 10 | |
| 2007 | Guipúzcoa | Natalia Zabala Arroyo | Unplaced | |
| 2006 | Málaga | Elisabeth Reyes Villegas | Unplaced | |
| 2005 | Gerona | Verónica Hidalgo | Unplaced | |
| 2004 | Jaén | María Jesús Ruiz Garzón | Unplaced | |
| 2003 | Seville | Eva María González Fernández | Unplaced | |
| 2002 | Almería | Vania Millán Miras | Unplaced | |
| 2001 | Lleida | Eva Sisó Casals^{[B]} | Top 10 | |
| 2000 | Las Palmas | Helen Lindes Griffiths | 2nd Runner-up | Miss Photogenic |
| 1999 | Pontevedra | Diana Nogueira González | 2nd Runner-up | |
| 1998 | Murcia | María José Besora Villanueva | Unplaced | |
| 1997 | Vizcaya | Inés Sáinz Esteban | Unplaced | |
| 1996 | Seville | María José Suárez Benítez | Unplaced | |
| 1995 | Soria | María Reyes Vázquez | Unplaced | |
| 1994 | Córdoba | Raquel Rodríguez Hidalgo | Unplaced | |
| 1993 | Las Palmas | Eugenia Santana Alba | Top 10 | Miss Photogenic |
| 1992 | Valladolid | Virginia García Alvarez | Unplaced | |
| 1991 | Cádiz | Esther Arroyo Bermúdez | Unplaced | |
| 1990 | Seville | Raquel Revuelta Armengou | Unplaced | |
| 1989 | Córdoba | Eva María Pedraza López | Unplaced | |
| 1988 | Las Palmas | Sonsoles Artigas Mederos | Unplaced | |
| 1987 | Málaga | Remedios Cervantes Montoya | Unplaced | |
| 1986 | Málaga | Isabel Tur Espinosa | Unplaced | |
| 1985 | Seville | Maria Teresa Sánchez López | 1st Runner-up | |
| 1984 | Vizcaya | Garbiñe Abasolo García | Unplaced | Miss Photogenic |
| 1983 | Teruel | Ana Isabel Herrero García | Top 12 | |
| 1982 | Málaga | Cristina Pérez Cottrell | Unplaced | |
| 1981 | Las Palmas | Francisca Ondiviela | Unplaced | |
| 1980 | Asturias | Yolanda María Hoyos Vega | Unplaced | |
| 1979 | Las Palmas | Gloria María Valenciano | Unplaced | |
| 1978 | Islas Baleares | Guillermina Ruiz Doménech | 2nd Runner-up | |
| 1977 | Tenerife | Luz María Polegre Hernández | Top 12 | |
| 1976 | Pontevedra | Olga Fernández Pérez | Unplaced | |
| 1975 | Tenerife | Consuelo Martín López | Unplaced | |
| 1974 | Málaga | Amparo Muñoz Quesada | Miss Universe 1974 | |
| 1973 | Seville | Rocío Martín Madrigal | 3rd Runner-up | Best National Costume |
| 1972 | Madrid | Maria del Carmen Muñoz | Unplaced | |
| 1971 | Cádiz | Josefina Román Gutiérrez | Top 12 | |
| 1970 | Tenerife | Noelia Afonso Cabrera | Unplaced | |
| 1969 | Valencia | María Amparo Rodrigo Lorenzo | Unplaced | |
| 1968 | País Vasco | Yolanda Legarreta Urquijo | Unplaced | |
| 1967 | Córdoba | Paquita Delgado Sánchez | Top 15 | |
| 1966 | Málaga | Paquita Torres Pérez | Top 15 | Miss Congeniality |
| 1965 | Barcelona | Alicia Borrás | Unplaced | |
| 1964 | Madrid | María José Ulla Madronero | Unplaced | |
| 1963 | Tenerife | María Rosa Pérez Gómez | Unplaced | |
| 1962 | Barcelona | Conchita Roig Urpi | Unplaced | |
| 1961 | Madrid | Pilar Gil Ramos | Unplaced | |
| 1960 | Málaga | María Teresa del Río | 4th Runner-up | |
Did not compete from 1952-1959.

=== Miss Mundo España ===
- : Declared as Winner
- : Ended as runner-up or top 5/6 qualification
- : Ended as one of the finalists or semifinalists
- : Ended as special awards winner

Before 2012 either the winner or the First Runner-up of Miss Spain represented her country at the Miss World. Due to economic problems in Spain in 2011, the Miss España went bankrupt. From 2013-2016, the official candidate was selected by "Miss World Spain / Miss Mundo España" pageant, by the BE MISS ORG. Since 2017, the Nuestra Belleza España Organization handles the Miss World license.

| Year | Autonomous Community | Miss Mundo España | Placement at Miss World | Special Awards |
|---|---|---|---|---|
| 2026 | Balearic Islands | Elisabeth Reynés | 1st Runner-up | |
| 2025 | Tenerife | Corina Mrazek González | Unplaced | |
| 2024 | No competition held | | | |
| 2023 | Castellón | Paula Pérez | Top 12 | |
| 2022 | Miss World 2021 was rescheduled to 16 March 2022 due to the COVID-19 pandemic outbreak in Puerto Rico, no edition started in 2022 | | | |
| 2021 | Almería | Ana García | Unplaced | |
| 2020 | Due to the impact of COVID-19 pandemic, no competition held | | | |
| 2019 | Córdoba | María Del Mar Aguilera | Top 40 | Miss World Sport (Top 32) |
| 2018 | Navarre | Amaia Izar | Unplaced | Miss World Talent (Top 18); Miss World Top Model (Top 24) |
| 2017 | Balearic Islands | Elisa Tulian | Unplaced | Miss World Talent Top 20 |
Be Miss Mundo España / Be Miss World Spain
| 2016 | Zaragoza | Raquel Tejedor | Unplaced | Miss World Sport (Top 24) |
| 2015 | Barcelona | Mireia Lalaguna | Miss World 2015 | Miss World Top Model; Miss World Sport (Top 24); Miss World Talent (Top 30) |
| 2014 | Castilla-La Mancha | Lourdes Fernández | Unplaced | |
| 2013 | Basque | Elena Ibarbia Jiménez | Top 6 | Miss World Sports (1st Runner-up); Miss World Beach Beauty (Top 11) |
Spanish Representatives from Miss España/Miss Spain
| 2012 | Las Palmas | Aránzazu Estévez Godoy | Top 15 | Miss World Top Model (Top 10); Miss World Beach Beauty (Top 40) |
| 2011 | Las Palmas | Carla Barber | Top 15 | Miss World Beach Beauty (Top 20); Beauty with a Purpose (Top 30) |
| 2010 | Seville | Fátima Jiménez | Unplaced | Miss World Top Model (Top 20) |
| 2009 | Granada | Carmen Laura García | Unplaced | Miss World Talent (Top 22) |
| 2008 | Tenerife | Patricia Yurena Rodríguez | Top 15 | Miss World Beach Beauty (Top 10); Miss World Top Model (Top 10) |
| 2007 | País Vasco | Natalia Zabala Arroyo | Unplaced | Miss World Beach Beauty (Top 21) |
| 2006 | Alicante | Inmaculada Torres Del Rey | Unplaced | Miss World Beach Beauty (Top 10) |
| 2005 | Catalonia | Mireia Verdú Tremosa | Top 15 | |
| 2004 | Catalonia | Maite Medina Cerrato | Unplaced | Miss World Top Model (4th Runner-up); Miss World Talent (Top 20) |
| 2003 | Málaga | Maria Teresa Martín | Unplaced | |
| 2002 | Seville | Lola Alcocer | Unplaced | |
| 2001 | Seville | Macarena García Naranjo | Top 10 | |
| 2000 | Catalonia | Verónica García Benito | Unplaced | |
| 1999 | País Vasco | Lorena Bernal Pascual | Top 10 | |
| 1998 | Cádiz | Rocío Jiménez Fernández | Unplaced | |
| 1997 | Balearic Islands | Nuria Avellaneda Gallego | Unplaced | |
| 1996 | Cantabria | Patricia Ruiz Fernández | Unplaced | |
| 1995 | Tenerife | Candelaria Rodríguez | Unplaced | |
| 1994 | Catalonia | Virginia Pareja Garófano | Unplaced | |
| 1993 | Madrid | Araceli García Eugenio | Unplaced | |
| 1992 | Balearic Islands | Samantha Torres | Unplaced | |
| 1991 | Tenerife | Maria Candelaria Moreno | Unplaced | |
| 1990 | Málaga | Maria del Carmen Carrasco | Unplaced | |
| 1989 | Córdoba | Eva Maria Pedraza | Unplaced | |
| 1988 | Catalonia | Susana de la Llave Varón | Top 5 | |
| 1987 | Las Palmas | Sonsoles Artigas Medero | Unplaced | |
| 1986 | Málaga | Remedios Cervantes | Unplaced | |
| 1985 | Valencia | Maria Amparo Martínez | Unplaced | |
| 1984 | Castilla-León | Juncal Rivero Fadrique | Unplaced | |
| 1983 | Las Palmas | Milagros Pérez Castro | Unplaced | |
| 1982 | Zaragoza | Ana Isabel Herrero García | Unplaced | |
| 1981 | Málaga | Cristina Pérez Cottrell | Unplaced | |
| 1980 | Las Palmas | Francisca Otero | Unplaced | |
| 1979 | Madrid | Maria Dolores Lola Forner Toro | Top 15 | |
| 1978 | Las Palmas | Gloria María Valenciano | Top 7 | |
| 1977 | Balearic Islands | Guillermina Ruiz Doménech | Top 15 | |
| 1976 | Tenerife | Luz Maria Polegre Hernández | Top 15 | |
| 1975 | Pontevedra | Olga Fernández Pérez | Withdrew from Miss World on the date of the finals after the announcement of the death of Francisco Franco which resulted in Pérez being too distressed to compete in the finals. | |
| 1974 | Tenerife | Natividad Rodríguez | Top 15 | |
| 1973 | Catalonia | Mariona Rosell | Unplaced | |
| 1972 | Madrid | Maria del Carmen Muñoz | Unplaced | |
| 1971 | Madrid | María Margarita García | Top 15 | |
| 1970 | Cádiz | Josefina Román Gutiérrez | Unplaced | |
Did not compete between 1965—1969
| 1964 | Madrid | Maria José Ulla Madronero | Top 16 | |
| 1963 | Málaga | Encarnación Zalabardo | Unplaced | |
| 1962 | Catalonia | Conchita Roig Urpi | Unplaced | |
| 1961 | Cataluña | Maria del Carmen Fernández | 2nd Runner-up | |
| 1960 | Barcelona | Concepción Molinera Palacios | Unplaced | |
Did not compete from 1951-1959.

=== Miss Internacional España ===
- : Declared as Winner
- : Ended as runner-up or top 5/6 qualification
- : Ended as one of the finalists or semifinalists
- : Ended as special awards winner

Before 2012 the Second Runner-up of Miss Spain represented her country at the Miss International. Since 2013 the official Miss Internacional España set the independent pageant to crown new winner to Miss International after the organization of Miss España bankruptcy.

| Year | Autonomous Community | Miss Internacional España | Placement at Miss International | Special Awards |
|---|---|---|---|---|
| 2026 | Cádiz | Laura Dowell | TBA | |
| 2025 | Canary Islands | Idayra Tena | Unplaced | |
| 2024 | Cádiz | Alba Perez | 2nd Runner-up | |
| 2023 | Las Palmas | Claudia González | Unplaced | |
| 2022 | Seville | Julianna Ro | Top 8 | Miss Visit Japan Tourism |
Due to the impact of COVID-19 pandemic, no competition held between 2020―2021
| 2019 | Balearic Islands | Claudia Cruz | Unplaced | |
| 2018 | Huelva | Susana Sanchez | Top 8 | |
| 2017 | Tenerife | Elizabeth Victoria Laker | Unplaced | |
| 2016 | Madrid | Anabel Delgado Torres | Unplaced | |
| 2015 | Seville | Cristina Silva Cano | Unplaced | |
| 2014 | Barcelona | Rocío Tormo | Unplaced | |
| 2013 | Albacete | Araceli Carrilero Martínez | Top 15 | |
Spanish Representatives from Miss España/Miss Spain
| 2012 | Valencia | Ana Amparo Martínez | Unplaced | |
| 2011 | A Coruña | Sarah Lopez | Unplaced | |
| 2010 | Cádiz | Desirée Panal Muñoz | Top 15 | |
| 2009 | Málaga | Melania Santiago | Top 15 | |
| 2008 | Zaragoza | Alejandra Andreu | Miss International 2008 | Miss Photogenic |
| 2007 | Vizcaya | Nerea Arce Alea | Top 15 | |
| 2006 | Soria | Sara Sánchez Torres | Top 12 | |
| 2005 | Seville | Maria del Pilar Domínquez | Unplaced | |
| 2004 | Seville | Cristina Gómez Domínguez | Top 15 | |
| 2003 | Cordoba | Maria Carrillo Reyes | Unplaced | |
| 2002 | Cordoba | Laura Espinosa Huertas | Top 15 | |
| 2001 | Castellón | Ayola Molina Carrasco | Top 15 | |
| 2000 | Barcelona | Raquel Gonzales Rovira | Unplaced | |
| 1999 | Seville | Carmen Fernández Ruiz | 1st Runner-up | |
| 1998 | Alicante | Vanessa Romero Torres | Top 10 | |
| 1997 | Murcia | Isabel Gil Gambín | Top 10 | |
| 1996 | Gerona | Rosa Maria Casado Teixidor | Top 10 | |
| 1995 | Madrid | Jimena Garay | Top 10 | |
| 1994 | — | Carmen Maria Vicente Abellan | 2nd Runner-up | |
| 1993 | Badajoz | Ana Piedad Galván | Unplaced | |
| 1992 | Balearic Islands | Samantha Torres Waldrón | Top 10 | |
| 1991 | Cataluña | Elodie Chantal Jordá de Quay | Top 10 | |
| 1990 | Tenerife | Silvia de Esteban | Miss International 1990 | |
| 1989 | Vizcaya | Mercedes Martín Mier | Top 10 | |
| 1988 | — | Maria Carmen Aragall Casadellá | Top 10 | |
| 1987 | Vizcaya | Ana García Bonilla | Top 10 | |
| 1986 | Barcelona | Irán Pont Gil | Top 10 | |
| 1985 | Aragón | Beatriz Molero Beltrán | Top 10 | |
| 1984 | Seville | Soledad Marisol Pila Balanza | Top 10 | |
| 1983 | Las Palmas | Milagros Pérez Castro | Top 10 | |
| 1982 | Alicante | María del Carmen Arqués | 1st Runner-up | |
| 1981 | Las Palmas | Francisca Ondiviela | Unplaced | |
| 1980 | Barcelona | María Agustina García | 2nd Runner-up | |
| 1979 | Asturias | Yolanda Maria Hoyos | Unplaced | |
| 1978 | Andalusia | Maria Inmaculada Arencibia | Unplaced | |
| 1977 | Madrid | Pilar Medina | Miss International 1977 | Best National Costume |
| 1976 | Tenerife | Victoria Martín González | Unplaced | |
| 1975 | Cataluña | Maria Teresa Maldonado | Unplaced | |
| 1974 | Balearic Islands | Consuelo Martín López | Top 15 | |
| 1973 | Las Palmas | Maria Isabel Lorenzo | 2nd Runner-up | Miss Photogenic |
| 1972 | Málaga | Gloria Puyol Toledo | Unplaced | |
| 1971 | — | Consuelo Varela Costales | Unplaced | |
| 1970 | Madrid | María Margarita García | Unplaced | |
| 1969 | Las Palmas | Mery de Lara Caballero | Top 15 | |
| 1968 | Pais Vasco | Yolanda Legarreta Urquijo | Unplaced | |
| 1967 | Valencia | Amparo Ruiz | Unplaced | |
| 1966 | No contest | | | |
| 1965 | Las Palmas | Rafaela Roque Sánchez | Top 15 | |
| 1964 | Tenerife | Lucia Pilar Herrera | Unplaced | |
| 1963 | Andalusia | Encarnación Zalabardo | Unplaced | |
| 1961 | Cataluña | Maria Del Carmen Fernández | 2nd Runner-up | |
| 1960 | Pais Vasco | Elena Herrera Dávila-Núñez | Unplaced | |

=== Miss Europa España ===
- : Declared as Winner
- : Ended as runner-up or top 5/6 qualification
- : Ended as one of the finalists or semifinalists
- : Ended as special awards winner

From the 1920s to the 2000s, Spain's representative to Miss Europe was determined mainly through the Miss España (Miss Spain) pageant. With the only exception being 1936-1938 and the 1950s, with those selection processes being largely unknown. Since the 2010s, Spain's representative has been determined through other means of selection.

| Year | Autonomous Community | Miss Europa España | Placement at Miss Europe | Special Awards |
|---|---|---|---|---|
No contest since 2022
| 2021 | — | Amanda Ford | 1st Runner-Up | — |
| 2020 | — | Marine Ayala | 2nd Runner-Up | |
| 2019 | — | Andrea de las Heras | Miss Europe 2019 | |
| 2018 | — | Eugenia Gómez Rovira | Unplaced | |
| 2017 | — | Noelia Freire Benito | Unplaced | |
| 2016 | — | — | Unplaced | |
No contest between 2007 & 2015
Representatives from Miss España/Miss Spain
| 2006 | — | Laura Ojeda Ramirez | 2nd Runner-Up | |
| 2005 | — | Farah Ahmed Ali | Unplaced | |
| 2004 | No contest in 2004 | | | |
| 2003 | — | Patricia Ledesma Nieto | 3rd Runner-Up | |
| 2002 | — | Gemma Ruiz Garcia | Unplaced | |
| 2001 | — | Verónica Martín García | 4th Runner-Up | |
| 2000 | No contest in 2000 | | | |
| 1999 | — | Inmaculada Nadal González | Unplaced | |
| 1998 | No contest in 1998 | | | |
| 1997 | — | Patricia Jañez Rodríguez | 2nd Runner-Up | |
| 1996 | — | Aurelia Barrera Escalera | 4th Runner-Up | |
| 1995 | — | Ana Martínez Conde | Unplaced | |
| 1994 | — | Laura Marina Vicente Barreto | Top 12 | |
| 1993 | — | Ana Maria Pérez Ayllón | 3rd Runner-Up | |
| 1992 | — | Sofia Mazagatos | Unplaced | |
| 1991 | — | Silvia Maria Jato Núñez | 2nd Runner-Up later (1st Runner-Up) | |
No contest in 1989 and 1990
| 1988 | — | Ana Jesús Rebollos Fernández | Top 13 | |
No contest in 1986 & 1987
| 1985 | — | Juncal Rivero Fadrique Castilla | Miss Europe 1985 | |
| 1984 | — | Garbiñe Abásolo García | Unplaced | Miss Photogenic |
| 1983 | No contest in 1983 | | | |
| 1982 | — | Cristina Perez Cottrell | 2nd Runner-Up | |
| 1981 | — | María Agustina García Alcaide | Top 11 | |
| 1980 | — | María Dolores "Lola" Forner Toro | 2nd Runner-Up | |
| 1979 | No contest in 1979 | | | |
| 1978 | — | Guillermina Ruiz-Doménech | Unplaced | |
| 1977 | No contest in 1977 | | | |
| 1976 | — | Olga Fernández Pérez | Unplaced | |
| 1975 | No contest in 1975 | | | |
| 1974 | — | Maria Isabel "Maribel" Lorenzo Saavedra | Miss Europe 1974 | Miss Friendship |
| 1973 | — | Amparo Muñoz Quesada | 1st Runner-Up | |
| 1972 | — | Maria del Carmen Muñoz Castañón | Unplaced | |
| 1971 | — | Josefina "Fina" Román Gutierrez de Chiclana | Unplaced | Miss Amity |
| 1970 | — | Noelia Alfonso Cabrera | Miss Europe 1970 | |
| 1969 | — | María Amparo Rodrigo Lorenzo | 4th Runner-Up | |
| 1968 | — | Francisca Delgado Sánchez | Unplaced | |
| 1967 | — | Paquita Torres Pérez | Miss Europe 1967 | |
| 1966 | — | Rafaela Roque Sánchez | 2nd Runner-Up | |
| 1965 | — | Alicia Borrás | 3rd Runner-Up | |
| 1964 | — | Rosa María Ruiz | 4th Runner-Up | |
| 1963 | — | María del Carmen Abreu Martínez | Unplaced | |
| 1962 | — | Maruja García Nicoláu | Miss Europe 1962 | |
| 1961 | — | Maria Del Carmen Cervera Fernández Núñez | 3rd Runner-Up | |
| 1960 | — | Elena Herrera Dávila-Núñez | Unplaced | |
| 1959 | Did not compete in 1959 | | | |
Miss Europa España / Miss Europe Spain
| 1958 | — | Adela Bustillo | Unplaced | |
| 1957 | — | Viola López Martínez | Unplaced | |
Did not compete between 1955 & 1956
| 1954 | — | Juanita Billa | Did not compete due to not meeting the qualifications to properly qualify for Miss Europe | |
Did not compete between 1948 & 1953. No contest in 1951. No contest between 1939 & 1947 due to World War II
Miss Europa España / Miss Europe Spain
| 1938 | — | Isa Reyes | Unplaced | |
| 1937 | — | Ambarina De Los Reyes | Unplaced | |
| 1936 | — | Antonita Arquès | Miss Europe 1936 | |
Miss España / Miss Spain
| 1935 | — | Alicia Navarro Cambronero | Miss Europe 1935 | |
| 1934 | — | María Eugenia Henríquez Girón | Unplaced | |
| 1933 | — | Emilia Docet | Unplaced | |
| 1932 | — | Teresita Daniel | Unplaced | |
| 1931 | — | Ermelina Carreño Rodríguez | Unplaced | |
| 1930 | — | Elena Plá Mompó | Unplaced | |
| 1929 | — | Pepita Samper Bono | Unplaced | |
Did not compete in 1927 and no contest in 1928

== See also ==
- Míster España
- Miss Earth Spain
- Miss Grand Spain
