= Miss Europe 1962 =

International beauty pageant

- Date: 2 June 1962
- Venue: Casino du Liban, Beirut, Lebanon
- Entrants: 17
- Placements: 5
- Winner: Maruja García Nicoláu; Spain

Miss Europe 1962 was the 25th edition of the Miss Europe pageant and the 14th edition under the Mondial Events Organization. It was held at the Casino du Liban in Beirut, Lebanon on 2 June 1962. Maruja García Nicoláu of Spain was crowned Miss Europe 1962 by outgoing titleholder Ingrun Helgard Möckel of Germany.

== Results ==
=== Placements ===
Final results	Contestant
Miss Europe 1962	Spain – Maruja García Nicoláu
1st runner-up	Denmark – Birgitte Heiberg
2nd runner-up	Finland – Kaarina Marita Leskinen
3rd runner-up	Holland – Catharina "Rina" Lodders
4th runner-up	Sweden – Brigitta Lundberg

== Contestants ==
- Austria – Dorli Lazek
- Belgium – Jacqueline Oroi
- Denmark – Birgitte Heiberg
- England – Kim Carlton
- Finland – Kaarina Marita Leskinen
- France – Jeanne Rossi
- Germany – Irene Ott
- Greece – Kaiti Papadaki
- Holland – Catharina "Rina" Lodders
- Iceland – Guðrun Bjarnadóttir
- Italy – Franca Cattaneo Ferrucci
- Luxembourg – Fernande Kodesch
- Norway – Beate Brevik Johansen
- Spain – Maruja García Nicoláu
- Sweden – Brigitta Lundberg
- Switzerland – Francine Delouille
- Turkey – Zeynep Viyal (Zeynep Ziyal)
