= Miss Europe 1935 =

International beauty pageant

- Date: 6 July 1935
- Venue: Torquay, England, United Kingdom
- Entrants: 15
- Debuts: Danube, Great Britain, Rhenanie (Saar Region) & Tunisia
- Withdrawals: Atlantic, England, Finland, Germany, Poland, Romania & Siberia
- Returns: Czechoslovakia & Greece
- Winner: Alicia Navarro Cambronero (Spain) Spanish Republic

Miss Europe 1935 was the eighth edition of the Miss Europe pageant and the seventh edition under French journalist Maurice de Waleffe. It was held in Torquay, England, United Kingdom on 6 July 1935. Alicia Navarro Cambronero of Spain was crowned Miss Europe 1935.

== Results ==
=== Placements ===
Placement	Contestant
Miss Europe 1935	Spanish Republic – Alicia Navarro Cambronero

== Contestants ==
Contestants for the 1935 contest are as follows:

- Belgium – Stéphanie Boumans
- Czechoslovakia – Trude Böhm
- Denmark – Ellen Örregaard
- France – Gisèle Préville
- Great Britain – Muriel Oxford
- Greece – Nicky Papadopoulou
- Holland – Stella Elte
- (Hungary) Hungarian Danube – Mária Nagy
- Hungary – Eva Feher
- Italy – Vanna Panzarasa
- Norway – Gerd Lovlien
- Rhenanie (Saar Region) – Elizabeth Pitz
- Russia (in exile) – Marianne Gorbatovsky
- Spanish Republic – Alicia Navarro Cambronero
- Tunisia – Georgette Temmos
