= Lorena Bernal =

Spanish actress, television host, and model

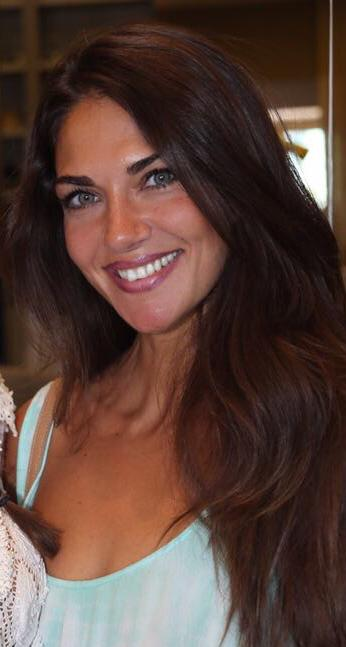
- Bernal in 2007
- Born: Lorena Raquel Bernal Pascual; 12 May 1981 (age 45); Tucumán, Argentina
- Spouse: Mikel Arteta
- Children: 3
- Modeling information
- Height: 1.73 m (5 ft 8 in)
- Hair color: Brown
- Eye color: Blue Green

Lorena Raquel Bernal Pascual (born 12 May 1981) is an Argentine-Spanish actress known for her roles in Chuck and CSI Miami. She is also a television host and model. She is married to current Arsenal manager Mikel Arteta.

== Early life ==
Bernal was born in San Miguel de Tucumán, Argentina. She moved to San Sebastián, Spain, when she was 9 years old, and studied at the French Lycée Français de Saint Sébastien in the city, then at Maurice Ravel school in Saint Jean de Luz across the border in France. She is fluent in Spanish, English, and French.

== Career ==
Bernal has worked as a model since the age of seven and began drama classes at the age of 13. She was Miss Spain 1999 at the age of 17 and could not represent the country in Miss Universe due to her age, so instead she competed in Miss World where she was one of the 10 finalists.

Since then, Bernal has worked as a model, TV host, and actress in Spain and in the United States, where she appeared in the American television show Chuck as an international arms dealer and CSI: Miami in the role of Mía, a nanny, in the episode "My Nanny."

== Personal life ==
She is married to Spanish former footballer Mikel Arteta, the current manager of Premier League football club Arsenal and former player at Everton and Arsenal, among others.

The couple's first child, called Gabriel, was born in Spain in 2009. Their second child, Daniel, was born in 2012, and their third child, Oliver, was also born in Spain in 2015.

== Filmography ==
- Stiletto 2008.
- Unnatural causes 2006.
- The Deal 2005.
- El Kibris 2004.
- Mendigares 2001.
- Menos es más 2000.

== Television series ==
- Chuck 2007.
- CSI: Miami 2007.
- See Jayne Run 2007.
- Homozapping 2005.
- El Comisario 2005.
- El pasado es mañana 2005.
- Aida 2005.
- La sopa boba 2004.
- Se puede? 2004.
- Luna Negra 2003–2004.
- Paraiso 2002–2003.
- Ala-Dina 2002.
- El secreto 2001–2002.
- El Señorío de Larrea 1999.

=== TV host ===
- Gala Sebastia 2006 (IB3TV)
- Gala Castello 2005
- Gala Palma Jove (2005) (IB3TV)
- Gala Mataro Solidario (2005) (Canal 7)
- Gala Geniales (homenaje a Carmen Sevilla) (2004) (TVE)
- Gala La Rioja universal (2004) (TVE)
- Gala Regio de Oro Awards (2004) (Canal 7)
- Gala End of the year (2002) (ETB)
- The Arthur show (13 programas) (2001)(ETB)
- Gala Int´I vasque channel for LatinAmerica (2001) (ETB)
- Gala New image channel (2001) (EITB)
- The first night (31 programas)(2000) (ETB)
- Gala 2000 Christmas Eve (2000) (ETB)
- Animalada total (1999) (ETB)
- Gala homenaje a Gila (1999) (TVE)
- Únicas (1999) (Antena 3 TV)

=== Commercials ===
- Lois 1996
- Freixenet 1999
- Oro vivo 1999
- Pepe Jeans London 1999
- Prohibida, videoclip del cantante Raúl 2000.
- Jesús Paredes 2000
- Nivea 2002 Telepromoción de Tele5.
- Campofrío 2004 Telepromoción de TVE.
- Dister 2004-2005
- Pantene pro v 2005
- Joyca 2005
- Oral B
- Depitotal
- Herbal Essence (2010)
- Eguzki Lore (2011)
