= Sofía del Prado =

Spanish model (born 1995)

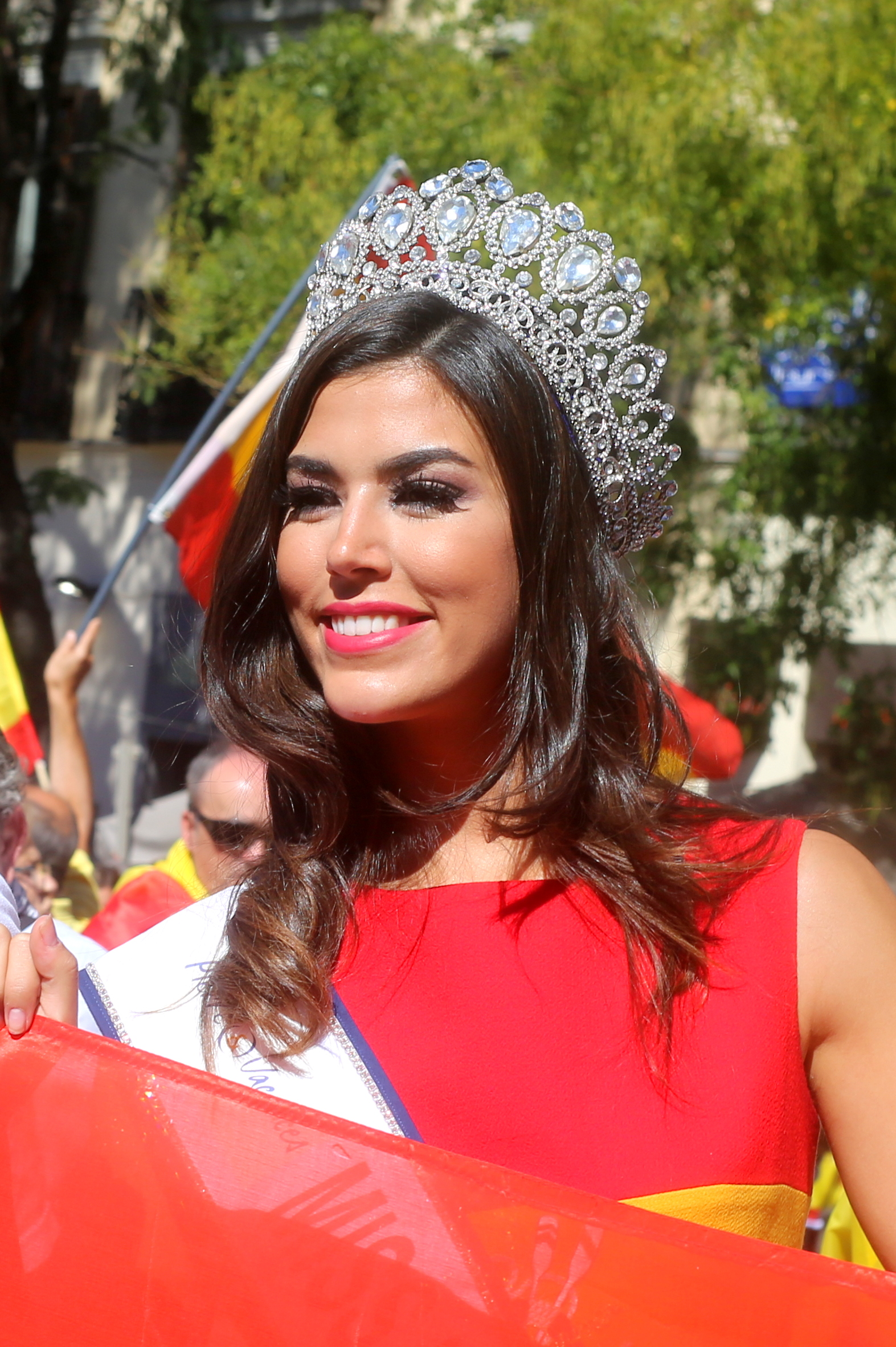
- Sofía del Prado in October 2017
- Born: Sofía del Prado Prieto; 11 February 1995 (age 31); Villarrobledo, Albacete, Castilla-La Mancha, Spain
- Height: 1.81 m (5 ft 11 in)
- Beauty pageant titleholder
- Title: Reina Hispanoamericana España 2015; Reina Hispanoamericana 2015; Miss Universe Spain 2017
- Hair color: Dark brown
- Eye color: Brown
- Major competitions: Miss Universe Spain 2015; (2nd Runner-Up); Reina Hispanoamericana 2015; (Winner); Miss Universe Spain 2017; (Winner); Miss Universe 2017; (Top 10)

Sofía del Prado Prieto (born 11 February 1995) is a Spanish beauty pageant titleholder who won Miss Universe Spain 2017. She represented Spain at the Miss Universe 2017, finishing as a Top 10 finalist.

== Early life ==
Del Prado was born in Albacete, Castilla-La Mancha, Spain. Del Prado grew up in Villarrobledo, Albacete, Spain.

== Education ==
In 2015, Del Prado attended college in Madrid, Spain. Del Prado earned a degree in International Relations. Del Prado was an intern at an international winery in the Department of International Commerce.

== Pageantry ==
On 30 July 2015, Del Prado was a contestant at the Miss Universe Spain 2015.

On 24 October 2015, Del Prado represented Spain at Reina Hispanoamericana 2015 in Santa Cruz, Bolivia and won that competition. In addition, del Prado also won Miss Sports and Miss Elegance Rosamar.

In 2017, del Prado again entered Miss Spain for a second attempt at being crowned. On 24 September 2017, at age 23, Del Prado won the title Miss Universe Spain 2017. Del Prado represented Spain at Miss Universe 2017 in Las Vegas, Nevada. She finished in the Top 10.

Awards and achievements
Preceded by Noelia Freire	Miss Universe Spain; 2017	Succeeded by Angela Ponce
