= Miss Europe 1970 =

International beauty pageant

- Date: 15 September 1970
- Venue: Skylistion Theatre, Piraeus, Greece
- Entrants: 20
- Placements: 7
- Debuts: Wales
- Withdrawals: Czechoslovakia, Denmark, Norway & Sweden
- Returns: Portugal & Scotland
- Winner: Noelia Alfonso Cabrera; Spain

Miss Europe 1970 was the 33rd edition of the Miss Europe pageant and the 22nd edition under the Mondial Events Organization. It was held at the Skylistion Theatre in Piraeus, Greece on 15 September 1970. Noelia Alfonso Cabrera of Spain was crowned Miss Europe 1970 by outgoing titleholder Saša Zajc of Yugoslavia.

== Results ==
=== Placements ===
Placement	Contestant
Miss Europe 1970	Spain – Noelia Alfonso Cabrera
1st Runner-Up	Portugal – Ana Maria Diozo Lucas
2nd Runner-Up	Italy – Anna Zamboni
3rd Runner-Up	Holland – Stephanie Flatow
4th Runner-Up	Greece – Vivi Alexopoulou
Top 7	Finland – Ursula Rainio

== Contestants ==
- Austria – Elfriede "Evi" Kurz
- Belgium – Francine Martin
- England – Jacqueline "Jackie" Francesca Molloy
- Finland – Ursula Rainio
- France – Françoise Durand-Behot
- Germany – Vera Kirst
- Greece – Vivi Alexopoulou
- Holland – Stephanie Flatow
- Iceland – Kristin Waage
- Ireland – Carmel Macken
- Italy – Anna Zamboni
- Luxembourg – Mady Dostert
- Malta – Rita Massard
- Portugal – Ana Maria Diozo Lucas
- Scotland – Lee Hamilton Marshall
- Spain – Noelia Alfonso Cabrera
- Switzerland – Diane Jane Roth
- Turkey – Asuman Tuğberk
- Wales – Sandra Cater
- Yugoslavia – Vicktorija (Viktorija) Ekart

== Notes ==
=== Withdrawals ===
Withdrew in protest of the Greek Military Government:

- Denmark
- Norway – Aud Fosse
- Sweden – Marie-Louise Nordlund

Other Withdrawals:

- Czechoslovakia – Withdrew after beauty pageants were banned in Czechoslovakia after Miss Czechoslovakia 1969/1970 Kristina Hanzalová fled to West Germany and requested refugee status after the 1970 Miss Universe Contest.

=== Returns ===
Last competed in 1933:

- Scotland

Last competed in 1963:

- Portugal

=== Debuts ===
- Wales
