= Miss Europe 1969 =

International beauty pageant

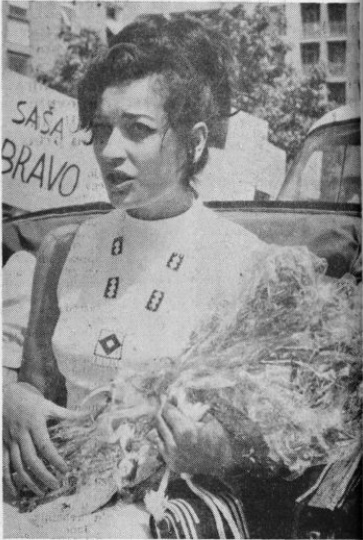
- Miss Europe 1969, Saša Zajc
- Date: 18 May 1969
- Venue: Rabat Hilton Hotel, Rabat, Morocco
- Entrants: 21
- Placements: 5
- Winner: Saša Zajc; Yugoslavia

Miss Europe 1969 was the 32nd edition of the Miss Europe pageant and the 21st edition under the Mondial Events Organization. It was held at the Rabat Hilton Hotel in Rabat, Morocco on 18 May 1969. Saša Zajc of Yugoslavia was crowned Miss Europe 1969 by Paquita Torres Pérez of Spain, Miss Europe 1967. Last year's titleholder, Leena Brusiin of Finland, was originally supposed to crown the winner at the end of the event, but could not attend the pageant due to a car accident before the pageant.

== Results ==
=== Placements ===
Placement	Contestant
Miss Europe 1969	Yugoslavia – Saša Zajc
1st Runner-Up	Denmark – Jeanne Perfeldt
2nd Runner-Up	Germany – Elke Hein
3rd Runner-Up	Finland – Harriet Marita Eriksson
4th Runner-Up	Spain – María Amparo Rodrigo
5th Runner-Up	Sweden – Ulla Adsten
6th Runner-Up	Norway – Patricia Ingrid Walker

== Contestants ==
- Austria – Renate Ferstl (?)
- Belgium – Maud Alin
- Czechoslovakia – Jarmila Teplanová
- Denmark – Jeanne Perfeldt
- England – Marie Smith
- Finland – Harriet Marita Eriksson
- France – Suzanne Angly
- Germany – Elke Hein
- Greece – Irini (Eirini) Lorandou
- Holland – Olga Westmaas
- Iceland – María Baldursdóttir
- Ireland – June MacMahon
- Italy – Zaira Fabbri
- Luxembourg – Jacqueline Schaeffer
- Malta – Natalie Quintana
- Norway – Patricia "Pia" Ingrid Walker
- Spain – María Amparo Rodrigo Lorenzo
- Sweden – Ulla Adsten
- Switzerland – Liselotte Pauli
- Turkey – Nurac Yetkin
- Yugoslavia – Saša Zajc

== Notes ==
=== Replacements ===
- Austria – Eva Rueber-Staier
- Switzerland – Patrice Sollner
