= Miss Europe 1982 =

International beauty pageant

- Date: June 11, 1982
- Venue: Istanbul, Turkey
- Entrants: 23
- Placements: 10
- Withdrawals: Cyprus
- Returns: Luxembourg; Malta; Portugal
- Winner: Nazlı Deniz Kuruoğlu; Turkey

Miss Europe 1982 was the 42nd edition of the Miss Europe pageant and the 31st edition under the Mondial Events Organization. It was held in Istanbul, Turkey on June 11, 1982. Nazlı Deniz Kuruoğlu of Turkey was crowned Miss Europe 1982 by outgoing titleholder Anne Mette Larsen of Denmark.

== Results ==
=== Placements ===
Placement	Contestant
Miss Europe 1982	Turkey – Nazlı Deniz Kuruoğlu
1st Runner-Up	Sweden – Annelie Margareta Sjöberg
2nd Runner-Up	Spain – Cristina Perez Cottrell
3rd Runner-Up	Wales – Caroline Jane Williams
4th Runner-Up	Portugal – Ana Maria Valdiz Wilson
Top 10	Finland – Tarja Hakakoski; France – Sabrina Belleval; Germany – Bettina Seylert; Holland – Brigitte Dierickx; Switzerland – Jeannette Linkenheil

== Contestants ==
- Austria – Karin Stocklitsch
- Belgium – Marie-Pierre Lemaître
- Denmark – Tina Maria Nielsen
- England – Jane Karen Davidson
- Finland – Tarja Hakakoski
- France – Sabrina Belleval
- Germany – Bettina Seylert
- Gibraltar – Michelle Lara
- Greece – Nantina Synnefia (Konstantina Synnefia)
- Holland – Brigitte Dierickx
- Iceland – Hlín Sveinsdóttir
- Ireland – Geraldine Mary McGrory
- Italy – Ivana Gianferdi
- Luxembourg – Brigitte Hliywiak
- Malta – Adelina Camilleri
- Norway – Anne Nybo
- Portugal – Ana Maria Valdiz Wilson
- Scotland – Lena Masterton
- Spain – Cristina Perez Cottrell
- Sweden – Annelie Margareta Sjöberg
- Switzerland – Jeannette Linkenheil
- Turkey – Nazlı Deniz Kuruoğlu
- Wales – Caroline Jane Williams

== Notes ==
=== Returns ===
- Luxembourg
- Malta
- Portugal

=== Withdrawals ===
- Cyprus
