= Miss Europe 1960 =

International beauty pageant

- Date: 11 June 1960
- Venue: Casino du Liban, Beirut, Lebanon
- Entrants: 17
- Placements: 5
- Returns: Spain & Switzerland
- Winner: Anna Ranalli; Italy

Miss Europe 1960 was the 23rd edition of the Miss Europe pageant and the 12th edition under the Mondial Events Organization. It was held at the Casino du Liban in Beirut, Lebanon on 11 June 1960. Anna Ranalli of Italy was crowned Miss Europe 1960 by outgoing titleholder Christl Spazier of Austria.

== Results ==
=== Placements ===
Final results	Contestant
Miss Europe 1960	Italy – Anna Ranalli
1st runner-up	Germany – Rita Simon
2nd runner-up	Sweden – Monica Abrahamsson
3rd runner-up	Austria – Luise Kammermeier
4th runner-up	France – Brigitte Barazer de Lannurien

== Contestants ==
- Austria – Luise Kammermeier
- Belgium – Diane Hidalgo
- Denmark – Tina Annelise Pedersen
- England – Joan Ellinor Boardman
- Finland – Marja-Leena (Maija-Leena) Manninen
- France – Brigitte Barazer de Lannurien
- Germany – Rita Simon
- Greece – Tzeni Loukea
- Holland – Ansje "Ans" Schoon
- Iceland – Edda Jónsdóttir
- Italy – Anna Ranalli
- Luxembourg – Liliane "Eliane" Müller
- Norway – Ragnhild Aass Loven
- Spain – Elena Herrera Dávila-Núñez
- Sweden – Monica Abrahamsson
- Switzerland – Eliane Maurath
- Turkey – UNKNOWN

== Notes ==
=== Returns ===
- Spain
- Switzerland
