= Miss Europe 1966 =

International beauty pageant

- Date: 30 May 1966
- Venue: Palais de la Méditerranée, Nice, France
- Entrants: 18
- Placements: 5
- Winner: Maria Dornier; France

Miss Europe 1966 was the 29th edition of the Miss Europe pageant and the 18th edition under the Mondial Events Organization. It was held at the Palais de la Méditerranée in Nice, France on 30 May 1966. Maria Dornier of France was crowned Miss Europe 1966 by outgoing titleholder Juliana Herm of Germany.

== Results ==
=== Placements ===
Final results	Contestant
Miss Europe 1966	France – Maria Dornier
1st runner-up	Austria – Eva Rieck (tied)
1st runner-up	Switzerland – Hedy Frick (tied)
2nd runner-up	Spain – Rafaela Roque Sánchez
3rd runner-up	Finland – Satu Charlotta Östring
4th runner-up	Germany – Tove-Regina Neitzel

== Contestants ==
- Austria – Eva Rieck
- Belgium – Mireille De Man
- Denmark – Gitte Fleinert
- England – Janice Carol Whiteman
- Finland – Satu Charlotta Östring
- France – Maria Dornier
- Germany – Tove-Regina Neitzel
- Greece – Stivi Vikardzi (Stivi Vikartzi)
- Holland – Margo Isabelle Domen
- Iceland – Rósa Einarsdóttir
- Ireland – Gladys Anne Waller (Ann Waller)
- Italy – Alba Rigazzi
- Luxembourg – Gigi Antinori
- Norway – Siri Gro Nilsen
- Spain – Rafaela Roque Sánchez
- Sweden – Gun-Inger Anna Andersson
- Switzerland – Hedy Frick
- Turkey – Hülya Aşan
