= Miss Europe 1932 =

International beauty pageant

- Date: 11 February 1932
- Venue: Nice, France
- Entrants: 17
- Debuts: Argentina, Paris' South American Colony
- Withdrawals: Austria, Estonia, Holland, Macedonia
- Returns: Czechoslovakia, Poland
- Winner: Aase Clausen; Denmark

Miss Europe 1932 is the fifth annual Miss Europe contest and the fourth under French journalist Maurice de Waleffe. With only 17 European girls competing in this pageant, Miss Denmark, Aase Clausen won Miss Europe 1932.

== Results ==
=== Placements ===
Final results	Contestant
Miss Europe 1932	Denmark – Aase Clausen

== Delegates ==
- Argentina – Isabel Franck
- Belgium – Suzanne Dandin
- Czechoslovakia – Julia Janowetz (Julia Janowetzová)
- England – Gwen Stallard
- Denmark – Aase Clausen
- France – Émilienne "Lyne" Caisson de Souza
- Germany – Ruth Behnen
- Greece – Euterpe Lampsa
- Hungary – Ica Lampel
- Italy – Rosetta Montali
- Paris' South American Colony – Ludmilla Riberio (of Peru)
- Poland – Zofia Dobrowolska
- Romania – Lilian Delescu
- Russia (in exile) – Nina Pohl
- Spain – Teresita Daniel
- Turkey – Keriman Halis Hanem
- Yugoslavia – Olga Djouritch

== National pageant notes ==
=== Debuts ===
- Argentina, and Paris' South American Colony went for the first time ever.

=== Withdrawals ===
- Austria, Estonia, and Holland
