= Miss Europe 1972 =

International beauty pageant

- Date: 21 June 1972
- Venue: Casino of Estoril, Estoril, Portugal
- Entrants: 23
- Placements: 5
- Debuts: Cyprus
- Withdrawals: Wales
- Returns: Scotland
- Winner: Monika Sarp; West Germany

Miss Europe 1972 was the 35th edition of the Miss Europe pageant and the 24th edition under the Mondial Events Organization. It was held at the Casino of Estoril in Estoril, Portugal on 21 June 1972. Monika Sarp of Germany was crowned Miss Europe 1972 by outgoing titleholder Filiz Vural of Turkey.

== Contestants ==
- Austria – Ursula Pacher (Bacher)
- Belgium – Anne-Marie Roger
- Cyprus – Maria Koutrouza
- Denmark – Marianne Schmitt
- England – Jennifer McAdam
- Finland – Maj-Len Linnea Eriksson
- France – Claudine Cassereau
- Germany – Monika Sarp
- Greece – Aleka Flega
- Holland – Jenny ten Wolde
- Iceland – Thorunn (Þórunn) Símonardóttir
- Ireland – Evelein Byrne
- Italy – Christina Crippa
- Luxembourg – Mady Dostert
- Malta – Mary Ann Best
- Norway – Liv Hanche Olsen
- Portugal – Iris Maria Rosário dos Santos
- Scotland – Elizabeth Joan Stevely
- Spain – Maria del Carmen Muñoz Castañón
- Sweden – Elisabeth Ire Johnson
- Switzerland – Diana Gubler
- Turkey – Mehtap Silahçıoğlu
- Yugoslavia – Daniela Krajcinovic

== Notes ==
=== Debuts ===
- Cyprus

=== Returns ===
- Scotland

=== Withdrawals ===
- Wales – Eileen Darroch; withdrew after having been rushed to the hospital with severe sunburns.
