= Miss Europe 2020 =

International beauty pageant

- Date: 22 December 2020
- Venue: Four Seasons Hotel George V Paris, Paris, France
- Entrants: 4
- Placements: 4
- Winner: Lara Jalloh; France

Miss Europe 2020 was the 63rd edition of the Miss Europe pageant and the fifth under the Miss Europe Organization. It was held at the Four Seasons Hotel George V Paris in Paris, France on 22 December 2020. Lara Jalloh of France was crowned Miss Europe 2020 by outgoing titleholder Andrea De Las Heras of Spain.

== Results ==
=== Placements ===
Placement	Contestant
Miss Europe 2020	France – Lara Jalloh
1st Runner-Up	Albania – Xhensila Shaba
2nd Runner-Up	Spain – Marine Ayala
3rd Runner-Up	United Kingdom – Sheida Rahni

== Contestants ==
- Albania – Xhensila "Xheni" Shaba
- France – Lara Jalloh
- Spain – Marine Ayala
- United Kingdom – Sheida Rahni
