= Miss Europe 1937 =

International beauty pageant

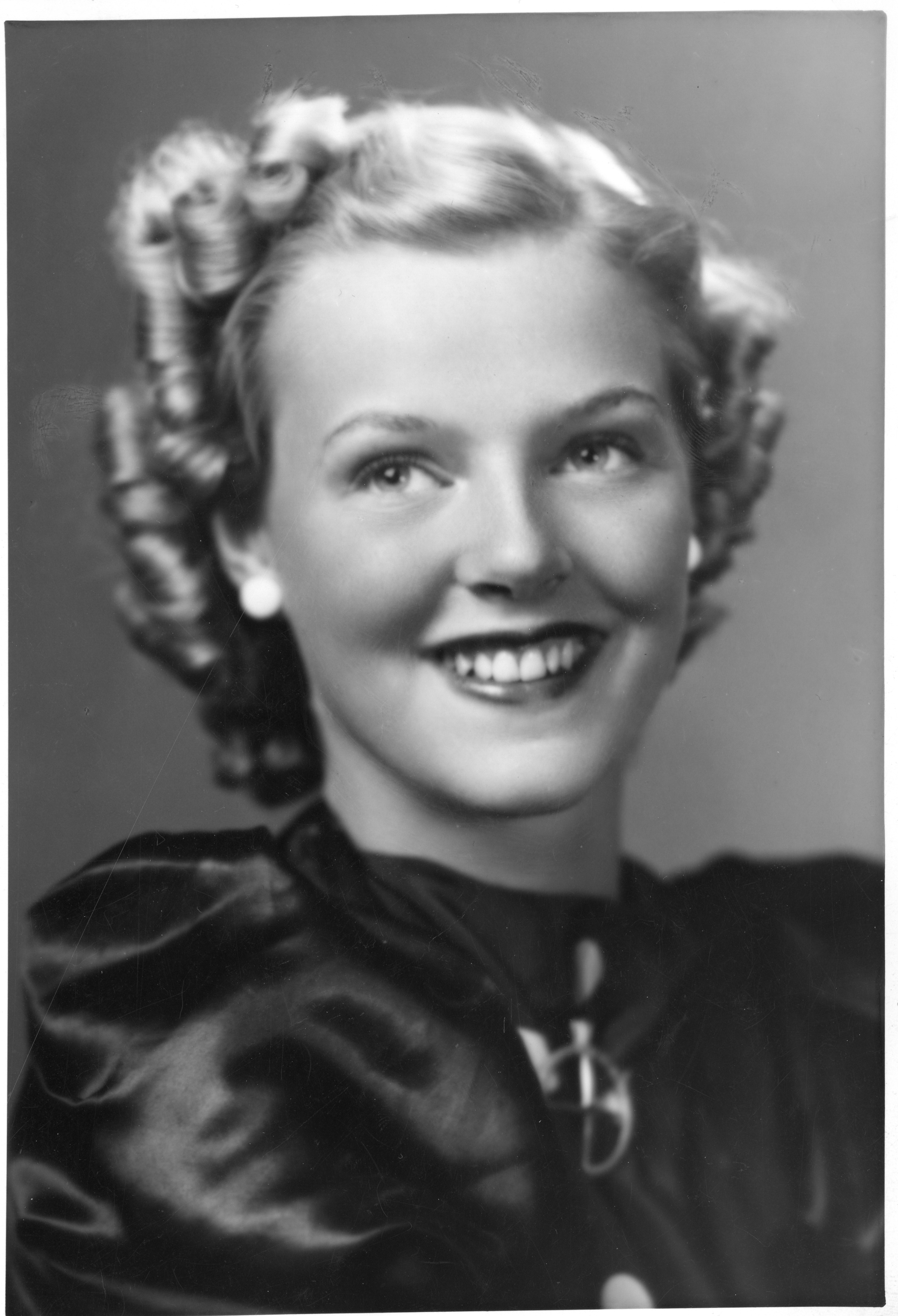
- Ms. Britta Wikström
- Date: December, 1937
- Venue: Constantine, Algeria
- Entrants: 9
- Withdrawals: Caucasus region, England, Greece, Holland, Hungary, Ireland, Morocco, Sweden, Syria-Lebanon, Tunisia
- Returns: Denmark, Finland, Switzerland
- Winner: Britta Wikström; Finland

Miss Europe 1937 was the tenth annual Miss Europe pageant and the ninth under French journalist Maurice de Waleffe. The contest took place in Constantine, Algeria, amid the international growing tensions that preceded World War II.

== Results ==
=== Placements ===
Final results	Contestant
Miss Europe 1937	Finland – Britta Wikström

== Delegates ==
- Belgium – José Decœur
- Finland – Britta Wikström
- Denmark – Tove Arni
- France – Jacqueline Janet
- Norway – Lisbeth Grung
- Poland – Jozefa Kaczmarkiewicz
- Russia (in exile) – Anna Betoulinski
- Spanish Republic – Ambarina De Los Reyes
- Switzerland – Jacqueline Reyboubet

== Notes ==
Did not compete:

- Holland – Elsie Schimpf (no permission from her mother)
