= Miss Europe 1965 =

International beauty pageant

- Date: 6 June 1965
- Venue: Palais de la Méditerranée, Nice, France
- Entrants: 18
- Placements: 5
- Returns: Turkey
- Winner: Juliana Herm (West Germany) Germany

Miss Europe 1965 was the 28th edition of the Miss Europe pageant and the 17th edition under the Mondial Events Organization. It was held at the Palais de la Méditerranée in Nice, France on 6 June 1965. Juliana Herm of Germany was crowned Miss Europe 1965 by outgoing titleholder Elly Konie Koot of Holland.

== Results ==
=== Placements ===
Final results	Contestant
Miss Europe 1965	Germany – Juliana Herm
1st runner-up	Finland – Virpi Liisa Miettinen
2nd runner-up	Sweden – Ingrid Norrman
3rd runner-up	Spain – Alicia Borrás
4th runner-up	Denmark – Yvonne Hanne Ekman

== Contestants ==
- Austria – Carin Ingberg Schmidt
- Belgium – Lucy Emilie Nossent
- Denmark – Yvonne Hanne Ekman
- England – Jennifer Warren Gurley
- Finland – Virpi Liisa Miettinen
- France – Christiane Sibellin
- Germany – Juliana Herm
- Greece – Evgenia Ksagorari (Xagorari)
- Holland – Anja (Maria) Schuit
- Iceland – Sigrún Vignisdóttir
- Ireland – Mairead Cullen
- Italy – Anna Maria De Melgazzi
- Luxembourg – Marie-Anne Geisen
- Norway – Britt Aaberg
- Spain – Alicia Borrás
- Sweden – Ingrid Norrman
- Switzerland – Yvette Revelly
- Turkey – Mürüvvet Seyfioğlu

== Notes ==
=== Returns ===
- Turkey
