= Miss Europe 1976 =

International beauty pageant

- Date: 5 June 1976
- Venue: Castle of the Knights of St. John, Rhodes City, Rhodes Island, South Aegean, Greece
- Entrants: 22
- Placements: 7
- Withdrawals: Portugal & Turkey
- Returns: Denmark, Iceland, Scotland, Wales & Yugoslavia
- Winner: Riitta Inkeri Väisänen; Finland
- Photogenic: Mary Kirkwood; Scotland
- Miss Elegance: Mary Kirkwood; Scotland

Miss Europe 1976 was the 38th edition of the Miss Europe pageant and the 27th edition under the Mondial Events Organization. It was held at the Castle of the Knights of St. John in Rhodes City, Rhodes Island, South Aegean, Greece on 5 June 1976. Riitta Inkeri Väisänen of Finland was crowned Miss Europe 1976 by outgoing titleholder Maria Isabel "Maribel" Lorenzo Saavedra of Spain. The 1976 contest was held two years after the previous one instead of one year due to the 1975 contest being cancelled. The 1975 contest was originally scheduled to take place in Beirut, Lebanon but was cancelled due to the Lebanese Civil War.

== Results ==
=== Placements ===
Placement	Contestant
Miss Europe 1976	Finland – Riitta Väisänen
1st Runner-Up	Switzerland – Isabella Fischbacher
2nd Runner-Up	Holland – Lucie Visser
3rd Runner-Up	Greece – Melina Michailidou
4th Runner-Up	Scotland – Mary Kirkwood
Top 7	Cyprus – Andri Tsangaridou; Norway – Bente Lihaug

=== Special awards ===
Award	Contestant
Miss Elegance	Scotland – Mary Kirkwood
Miss Photogenic	Scotland – Mary Kirkwood

== Contestants ==
- Austria – Heidi-Marie Passian
- Belgium – Yvette Maria Aelbrecht
- Cyprus – Andri (Antri) Tsangaridou
- Denmark – UNKNOWN
- England – Pauline Davies
- Finland – Riitta Inkeri Väisänen
- France – Monique Uldaric
- Germany – Karen Fastner
- Greece – Melina Michailidou
- Holland – Lucie Visser
- Iceland – Lara Sveinbergsdóttir
- Ireland – Elaine Rosemary O’Hara
- Italy – Maria Rosa Chimenti
- Luxembourg – Monique Wilmes
- Malta – Carmela Bonello
- Norway – Bente Lihaug
- Scotland – Mary Kirkwood
- Spain – Olga Fernández Pérez
- Sweden – Caroline Westerberg
- Switzerland – Isabella Fischbacher
- Wales – Sian Helen Adey-Jones
- Yugoslavia – UNKNOWN

== Notes ==
=== Withdrawals ===
- Portugal
- Turkey

=== Returns ===
- Denmark
- Iceland
- Scotland
- Wales
- Yugoslavia

=== Replacements ===
- Greece – Christiana Kavroudaki was replaced by Melina Michailidou during the contest.

== "Comité Officiel et International Miss Europe" Competition ==
Miss Europa 1976
- Date: May 1976
- Venue: Luna Park de Ricard, Andorra la Vella, Andorra
- Entrants: 23
- Placements: 5
- Debuts: Iceland
- Withdrawals: England, Elegance (Miss Elegance), Mediterranean, Scotland, Wales, Yugoslavia
- Returns: Austria, Italy, Monaco & Turkey
- Winner: Maria Teresa Maldonado Valle; Spain

From 1951 to 2002 there was a rival Miss Europe competition organized by the "Comité Officiel et International Miss Europe". This was founded in 1950 by Jean Raibaut in Paris, the headquarters later moved to Marseille. The winners wore different titles like Miss Europe, Miss Europa or Miss Europe International.

This year, the contest took place at the Luna Park de Ricard in Andorra la Vella, Andorra in May 1976. There 23 contestants all representing different countries and regions of Europe. At the end, Maria Teresa Maldonado Valle of Spain was crowned as Miss Europa 1976. She succeeded predecessor Vivianne Van der Cauter of Belgium.

=== Placements ===
Final results	Contestant
Miss Europa 1976	Spain – Maria Teresa Maldonado Valle
1st runner-up	Holland – Nanny van der Kuyl
2nd runner-up	Andorra – Nuria Berruezo
3rd runner-up	Monaco – Danielle Payan
4th runner-up	Iceland – Torill Mariann Larsen (of Norway)

=== Special awards ===
Award	Contestant
Miss Beautiful Legs	Finland – Anne Korhonen
Miss Elegance	France – UNKNOWN
Miss Photogenic	Iceland – Torill Mariann Larsen (of Norway)

=== Contestants ===
- Andorra – Nuria Berruezo
- Austria – UNKNOWN
- Denmark – UNKNOWN
- Finland – Anne Korhonen
- France – UNKNOWN
- Germany – UNKNOWN
- Holland – Nanny van der Kuyl
- Iceland – Torill Mariann Larsen (of Norway)
- Italy – UNKNOWN
- Luxembourg – UNKNOWN
- Monaco – Danielle Payan
- Norway – Nina Kristine Ronneberg
- Spain – Maria Teresa Maldonado Valle
- Sweden – UNKNOWN
- Switzerland – UNKNOWN
- Turkey – UNKNOWN

=== Notes ===
==== Withdrawals ====
- Belgium
- England
- Elegance (Miss Elegance)
- Ireland
- (Cyprus) (France) (Greece) (Italy) (Malta) (Monaco) Mediterranean
- Portugal
- Scotland
- Wales
- Yugoslavia

==== Returns ====
- Austria
- Italy
- Monaco
- Turkey

==== Debuts ====
- Iceland
