= Miss Europe 1958 =

International beauty pageant

- Date: 28 June 1958
- Venue: Istanbul, Turkey
- Entrants: 15
- Placements: 5
- Withdrawals: Greece
- Returns: Norway
- Winner: Johanna Ehrenstrasser; Austria

Miss Europe 1958 was the 21st edition of the Miss Europe pageant, held in Istanbul, Turkey on 28 June 1958. At the end of the event, Corine Rottschäfer of Holland crowned Johanna Ehrenstrasser of Austria as Miss Europe 1958.

Contestants from fifteen countries competed in this year's pageant.

== Results ==
=== Placements ===
Placement	Contestant
Miss Europe 1958	Austria – Johanna Ehrenstrasser
1st runner-up	West Germany – Dagmar Herner
2nd runner-up	France – Annie Simplot
3rd runner-up	Holland – Luciënne Struve
4th runner-up	Finland – Pirkko Mannola

== Contestants ==
=== Selection of participants ===
Contestants from fifteen countries competed in this edition. This edition saw the return of Norway, and the withdrawal of Greece. May Cavalika of Greece could not compete due to political tensions between Greece and Turkey over Cyprus. Poland was also set to compete but withdrew for undisclosed reasons.

=== List of contestants ===
Fifteen contestants competed for the title.

Country/Territory	Contestant	Age (Note: Ages at the time of the pageant)	Hometown
Austria	Johanna "Hanni" Ehrenstrasser	19	Vienna
Belgium	Jeanne Chandelle	19	Brussels
Denmark	Åse Hansen	–	Copenhagen
England	Dorothy Hazeldine	19	Rochdale
Finland	Pirkko Mannola	19	Sääksmäki
France	Annie Simplot	22	Marseille
Holland	Luciënne Struve	18	Rotterdam
Iceland	Anna Guðmundsdóttir	–	Reykjavík
Italy	Elisabetta Rota	18	Merano
Luxembourg	Lydie Schmitz	22	Luxembourg City
Norway	Elizabeth Tonning	–	Oslo
Spain	Adela Bustillo	–	Cantabria
Sweden	Marie-Louise Hjelm	–	Stockholm
Turkey	Ezel Olcay	18	Istanbul
West Germany	Dagmar Herner	20	Bavaria

== Miss Europa 1958 ==
Miss Europa 1958
- Date: July 1958
- Venue: Amiens, France
- Entrants: 8
- Placements: 2
- Debuts: Albania; Poland; Spain
- Withdrawals: Yugoslavia
- Winner: Evelyne Ricket; France

Miss Europa 1958 was the fifth edition of the Miss Europe pageant organized by the "Comité Officiel et International Miss Europe", held in Amiens, France on July 1958. At the end of the event, Evelyne Ricket of France was crowned as Miss Europa 1958.

=== Placements ===
Placement	Contestant
Miss Europa 1958	France – Evelyne Ricket
1st runner-up	Albania – Hajett Rekik

=== List of contestants ===
Eight contestants competed for the title.

Country/Territory	Contestant	Age	Hometown
Albania	Hajett Rekik	–	Tirana
Austria	Eda Prack	–	Vienna
France	Evelyne Ricket	–	Alsace
Italy	Giacomina Forlini	–	Rome
Overseas France	Claudie Johns	–	–
Poland	Linda Lolyi	–	–
Spain	Colette Obadia	–	–
Switzerland	Liliane Ringler	–	–
