= Miss Europe 1968 =

International beauty pageant

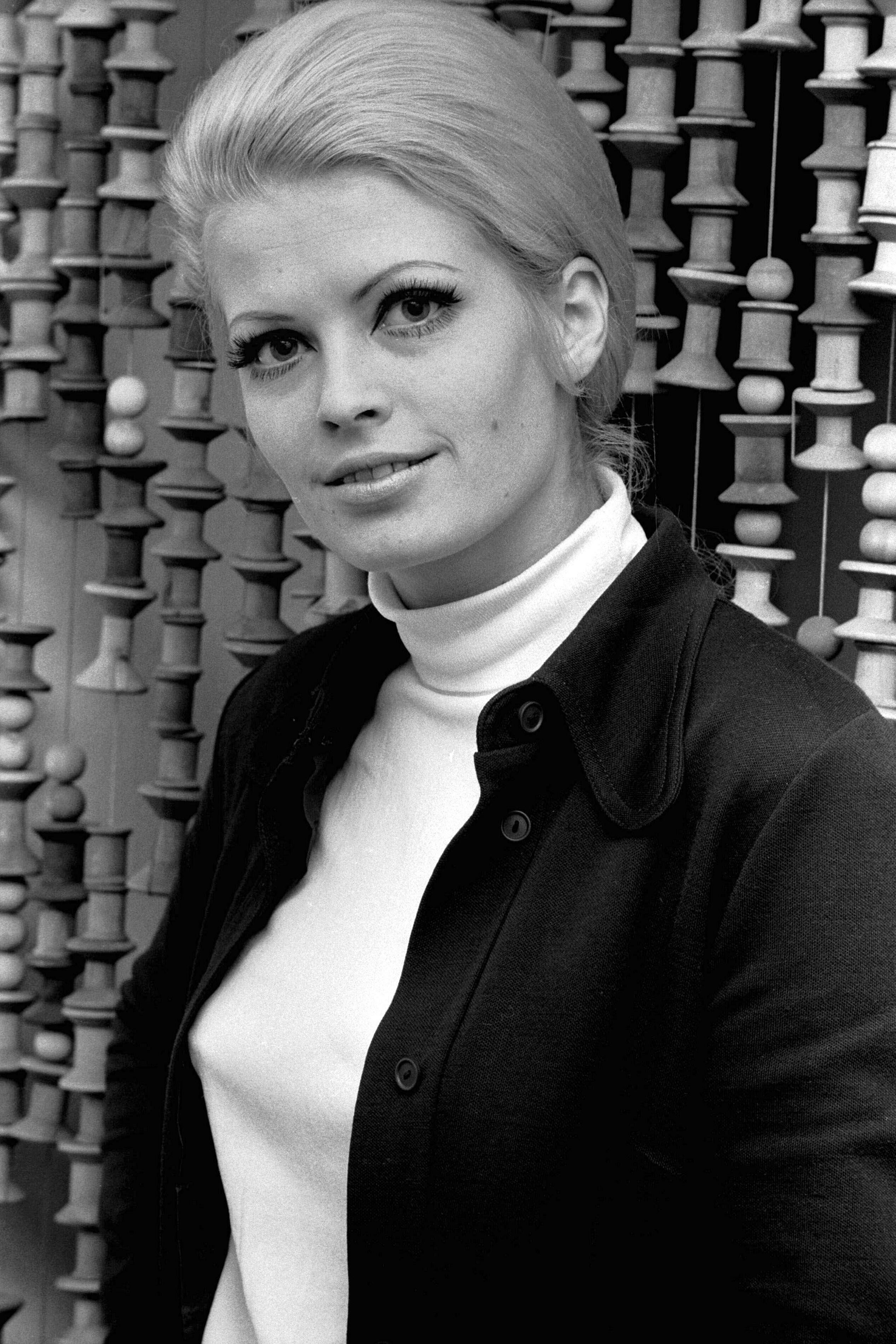
- Leena Brusiin
- Date: September 23, 1968
- Venue: Kinshasa, Congo-Kinshasa
- Entrants: 21
- Placements: 5
- Returns: Czechoslovakia
- Winner: Leena Brusiin; Finland
- Best in African Wear: Leena Brusiin (Finland)

Miss Europe 1968 was the 31st edition of the Miss Europe pageant and the 20th edition under the Mondial Events Organization. It was held in Kinshasa, Congo-Kinshasa on September 23, 1968. Leena Marketta Brusiin of Finland was crowned Miss Europe 1968 by outgoing titleholder Paquita Torres Pérez of Spain. The pageant was originally scheduled to be held in Nice, France in May but was postponed due to the May-June 1968 civil unrest in France. Congo-Kinshasa later requested the pageant be hosted in their country because they saw it as a good advertisement for them.

== Results ==
=== Placements ===
Placement	Contestant
Miss Europe 1968	Finland – Leena Brusiin
1st Runner-Up	Austria – Brigitte Krüger
2nd Runner-Up	Sweden – Christina Gullberg
3rd Runner-Up	West Germany – Roswitha Moesi
4th Runner-Up	Norway – Tone Knaran

=== Special awards ===
Award	Contestant
Best in African Wear	Finland – Leena Marketta Brusiin †

== Contestants ==
- Austria – Brigitte Krüger
- Belgium – Sonja Doumen
- Czechoslovakia – Alžběta Štrkulová
- Denmark – Berrit Kvorning
- England – Jennifer Lowe Summers
- Finland – Leena Marketta Brusiin
- France – Elizabeth Cadren
- West Germany – Roswitha Moesi
- Greece – Haris (Charis) Papanikita
- Holland – Marjolijn Ingrid Abbink
- Iceland – Helen Knutsdóttir
- Ireland – Mary Fitzgerald
- Italy – Paola Rossi
- Luxembourg – Lucienne Krier
- Malta – Kathlene Farrugia
- Norway – Tone Knaran
- Spain – Francisca Delgado Sánchez
- Sweden – Anne-Christine Kahnberg
- Switzerland – Jeanette Biffiger
- Turkey – Şule Ekşigil
- Yugoslavia – Daliborka Stojšić

== Notes ==
=== Returns ===
- Czechoslovakia
