= Miss Europe 1973 =

International beauty pageant

- Date: 13 January 1974
- Venue: Kitzbühel, Austria
- Entrants: 18
- Placements: 7
- Withdrawals: Denmark, Iceland, Malta, Norway & Scotland
- Winner: Anna Maria Groot; Holland
- Congeniality: Lydia Maes; Luxembourg
- Miss Elegance: Zoe Spink; England
- Miss Simpatia: Patrizia Castaldi; Italy

Miss Europe 1973 was the 36th edition of the Miss Europe pageant and the 25th edition under the Mondial Events Organization. It was held in Kitzbühel, Austria on 13 January 1974. Anna "Anke" Maria Groot of Holland was crowned Miss Europe 1973 by outgoing titleholder Monika Sarp of Germany.

== Results ==
=== Placements ===
Placement	Contestant
Miss Europe 1973	Holland – Anna "Anke" Maria Groot
1st Runner-Up	Spain – Amparo Muñoz
2nd Runner-Up	Greece – Sicta Vana Papadaki
3rd Runner-Up	Belgium – Christiane Devisch
4th Runner-Up	Switzerland – Barbara Schöttli
Top 7	England – Zoe Spink; Portugal – Carla Luisa Paiva Barros

=== Special awards ===
Award	Contestant
Miss Elegance	England – Zoe Spink
Miss Friendship	Luxembourg – Lydia Maes
Miss Simpatia	Italy – Patrizia Castaldi

== Contestants ==
- Austria – Roswitha Kobald
- Belgium – Christiane Devisch
- Cyprus – Eleni Stavrou Siakou
- England – Zoe Spink
- Finland – Raija Kaarina Stark
- France – Isabelle Krumacker
- Germany – Ingeborg Martin
- Greece – Sicta Vana Papadaki
- Holland – Anna "Anke" Maria Groot
- Ireland – Pauline Theresa Fitzsimons
- Italy – Patrizia Castaldi
- Luxembourg – Lydia Maes
- Portugal – Carla Luisa dos Santos Paiva Barros
- Spain – Amparo Muñoz
- Sweden – Christine Göthlander
- Switzerland – Barbara Schöttli
- Turkey – Nuray Belbüken
- Yugoslavia – Snežana Milojević

== Notes ==
=== Withdrawals ===
- Denmark
- Iceland – Nina Breidfjord (not permitted by her parents)
- Malta
- Norway – Aina Walle (got married)
- Scotland

== "Comité Officiel et International Miss Europe" Competition ==
Miss Europa 1973
- Date: 24 June 1973
- Venue: Barcelona, Spain
- Entrants: 16
- Placements: 3
- Withdrawals: Liechtenstein
- Winner: Diana Scapolan; Italy

From 1951 to 2002 there was a rival Miss Europe competition organized by the "Comité Officiel et International Miss Europe". This was founded in 1950 by Jean Raibaut in Paris, the headquarters later moved to Marseille. The winners wore different titles like Miss Europe, Miss Europa or Miss Europe International.

This year, the contest took place in Barcelona, Spain on 24 June 1973. There 16 contestants all representing different countries and regions of Europe. At the end, Diana Scapolan of Italy was crowned as Miss Europa 1973.

=== Placements ===
Final results	Contestant
Miss Europa 1973	Italy – Diana Scapolan
1st runner-up	Monaco – Veronique Mercier
2nd runner-up	Great Britain – Linda Hooks

=== Special awards ===
Award	Contestant
Best National Costume	Greece – Helene Sibiropoulos (Eleni Sidiropoulou)
Miss Beautiful Legs	Yugoslavia – Milene Birkic (Milena Brkić)
Miss Elegance	Switzerland – Laurence Erhart
Miss Friendship	France – Aleth Mosson
Miss Photogenic	Yugoslavia – Milene Birkic (Milena Brkić)
Miss Tourism Europe	Finland – Anne-Elisabeth Schäfer

==== Miss Tourism Europe ====
Final results	Contestant
Miss Tourism Europe	Finland – Anne-Elisabeth Schäfer
2nd place	Italy – Diana Scapolan
3rd place	Corsica – Teliziana Altieri

=== Contestants ===
- Austria – UNKNOWN
- Belgium – UNKNOWN
- Corsica – Teliziana Altieri
- Czechoslovakia – Bogina Adryva
- Finland – Anne-Elisabeth Schäfer
- France – Aleth Mosson
- Great Britain – Linda Hooks
- Greece – Helene Sibiropoulos (Eleni Sidiropoulou)
- Ireland – UNKNOWN
- Italy – Diana Scapolan
- Luxembourg – UNKNOWN
- (Cyprus) (France) (Greece) (Italy) (Malta) (Monaco) Mediterranean – UNKNOWN
- Monaco – Veronique Mercier
- Norway – Elisabeth Krabbe
- Switzerland – Laurence Erhart
- Yugoslavia – Milene Birkic (Milena Brkić)

=== Notes ===
==== Withdrawals ====
- Liechtenstein

==== Replacements ====
- Monaco – Nadine Benoit
