= Miss Europe =

Beauty contest

- Formation: 1927; 99 years ago
- Type: Beauty pageant
- Headquarters: Paris
- Location: France
- Official language: English; French
- Website: misseurope.eu

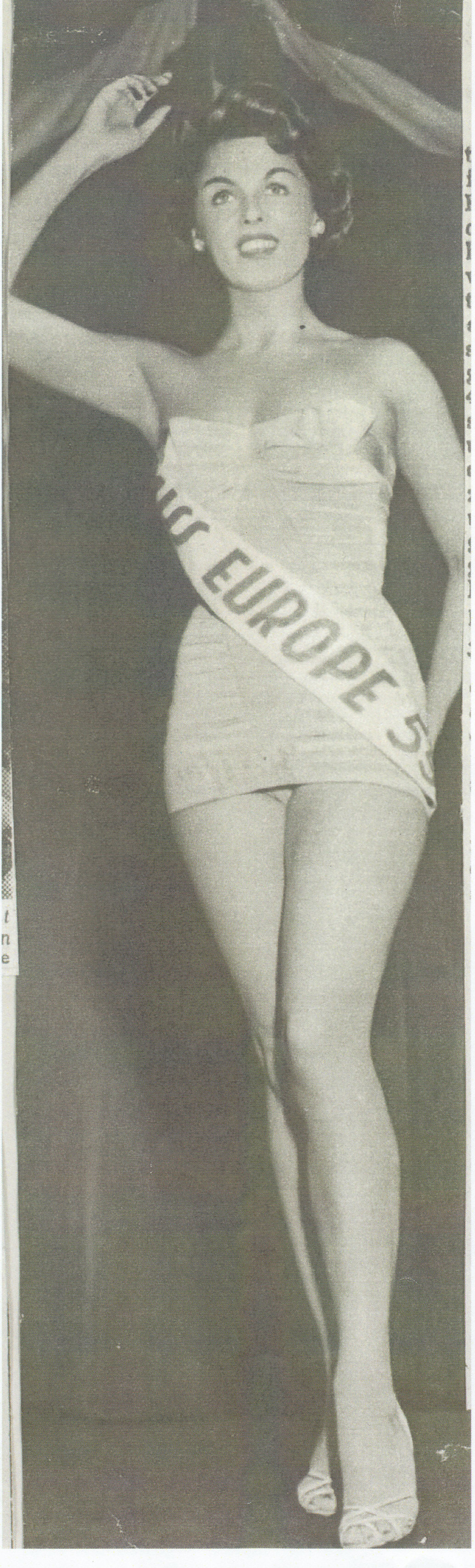
Miss Europe 1954–55, Christel Schaack

Miss Europe is a beauty pageant for women from all over Europe. It was established in February 1927 by Fanamet, the European distributor of Paramount, as a one-off event where the winner was to star in a film directed by F. W. Murnau. After the initial twelve-person jury couldn't decide between 10 contestants, a runoff election was held where Murnau chose the winner. Murnau ended up choosing Štefica Vidačić of Yugoslavia as the winner and the first ever Miss Europe. Miss Europe was later re-established in December 1928 by French journalist Maurice de Waleffe (1874–1946), who also created, in 1920, what by 1927 had become the Miss France pageant. Miss Europe, under de Waleffe, was first held at the Paris Opera with participants from 18 countries. The first contest under de Waleffe did not occur until February 1929.

The contest was interrupted by the onset of World War II but was later re-established, after de Waleffe died, by Roger Zeiler, chairman of the French Committee of Elegance, who teamed up with Claude Berr and they founded the International Committee for the election of Miss Europe (French: Comité International Pour L'election de Miss Europe), often shortened as simply the Miss Europe Committee (French: Comité Miss Europe), under the Mondial Events Organization (MEO). Most contestants won their respective national contests for Miss World & Miss Universe, and participated as supplemental training for their respective competitions. Berr died in 1981 and in 2003, Roger Zeiler sold the license for the pageant to Endemol France, part of the Dutch television production company Endemol. In 2007 to 2009, the competition was announced to be held in various location such as Moscow and Beirut but it did not happen as they had to stop the contest after 2006 due to internal problems with the organizations.

In 2016, the pageant was restarted by the newly formed Miss Europe Organization originally headquartered in London but then later moved to Edinburgh, Scotland. There is a connection with the previous organizers as the winner of the 2016 edition wore the same crown (tiara/diadem) as her predecessors, thus making this Miss Europe pageant the de facto successor to the main one.

== Official editions and titleholders ==
Year	Miss Europe	1st runner-up	2nd runner-up	3rd runner-up	4th runner-up	5th runner-up	6th runner-up	Location	Entrants
1927	Štefica Vidačić; Yugoslavia	Aniela Bogucka; Poland	Hilde Ptack; Austria	Not awarded	Not awarded	Not awarded	Not awarded	Vienna and Berlin	10
1928	No pageant was held								
1929	Böske Simon; Hungary	Władysława Kostakówna; Poland	Germaine Laborde; France	Not awarded	Not awarded	Not awarded	Not awarded	Paris, France	18
1930	Aliki Diplarakou; Greece	Yvette Labrousse; France	Jenny Vanparays; Belgium	Not awarded	Not awarded	Not awarded	Not awarded	Paris, France	19
1931	Jeanne Juilla; France	Hertha van Haentjens; Austria	Ingrid Ruth Richard; Germany	Not awarded	Not awarded	Not awarded	Not awarded	Paris, France	16
1932	Åse Clausen; Denmark	Not awarded	Not awarded	Not awarded	Not awarded	Not awarded	Not awarded	Nice, France	15
1933	Tatiana Maslova; Russia (in exile)	Julie Gal; Hungary	Not awarded	Not awarded	Not awarded	Not awarded	Not awarded	Madrid, Spain	14
1934	Ester Toivonen; Finland	June Lammas; England	Not awarded	Not awarded	Not awarded	Not awarded	Not awarded	Hastings, United Kingdom	16
1935	Alicia Navarro; Spain	Not awarded	Not awarded	Not awarded	Not awarded	Not awarded	Not awarded	Paris, France	15
1936	Antonia Arqués; Spain	Not awarded	Not awarded	Not awarded	Not awarded	Not awarded	Not awarded	Tunis, French Tunisia	15
1937	Britta Wikström; Finland	Not awarded	Not awarded	Not awarded	Not awarded	Not awarded	Not awarded	Algiers, French Algeria	9
1938	Sirkka Salonen; Finland	Not awarded	Not awarded	Not awarded	Not awarded	Not awarded	Not awarded	Copenhagen, Denmark	12
1939	Italia Brandonisio; Italy	Not awarded	Not awarded	Not awarded	Not awarded	Not awarded	Not awarded	Milan, Italy	Unknown
1940–1946	Not held due to World War II.								
1947	Yvette Draux; Belgium	Not awarded	Not awarded	Not awarded	Not awarded	Not awarded	Not awarded	London, United Kingdom	Unknown
1948	Results of Preliminary Contest			Not awarded	Not awarded	Not awarded	Not awarded	Enghien-les-Bains, France	12
1948	Jacqueline Donny; France	Anna-Liisa Leppänen; Finland	Helena Sutter; Switzerland	Not awarded	Not awarded	Not awarded	Not awarded	Enghien-les-Bains, France	12
1948	Final results			Not awarded	Not awarded	Not awarded	Not awarded	Enghien-les-Bains, France	12
1948	Jacqueline Donny; France	Rossana Martini (Undetermined); Italy Ingrid Jonaszin (Undetermined); Austria	Unknown	Not awarded	Not awarded	Not awarded	Not awarded	Enghien-les-Bains, France	12
1949	Juliette Figueras; France	Noëlle Stern; Switzerland	Anna Maria Visconti (tied); Italy Elinor Wedel Hansen (tied); Denmark	Maria Nadja Tiller; Austria	Elaine Pryce; England	Not awarded	Not awarded	Palermo, Italy	11
1950	Hanni Schall; Austria	Giovanna Pala; Italy	Ebba Adrian; Sweden	Not awarded	Not awarded	Not awarded	Not awarded	Rimini, Italy	14
1951	No pageant was held								
1952	Günseli Başar; Turkey	Nicole Drouin; France	Virginia Petimezaki; Greece	Not awarded	Not awarded	Not awarded	Not awarded	Naples, Italy	14
1953	Eloisa Cianni; Italy	Marlene Ann Dee; England	Sylviane Carpentier; France	Not awarded	Not awarded	Not awarded	Not awarded	Istanbul, Turkey	13
1954	Christel Schaack (Dethroned); Germany	Danielle Génault (Assumed); France	Yvonne de Bruyn; Finland	Gunilla Johansson; Sweden	Eva Brika; Greece	Not awarded	Not awarded	Vichy, France	13
1955	Inga-Britt Söderberg; Finland	Suna Soley; Turkey	Monique Lambert; France	Depi Martini; Greece	Margaret Rowe; England	Not awarded	Not awarded	Helsinki, Finland	13
1956	Margit Nünke; Germany	Ingrid Goude; Sweden	Brunella Tocci; Italy	Traudl Eichinger; Austria	Rita Schmidt; Holland	Not awarded	Not awarded	Stockholm, Sweden	13
1957	Corine Rottschäfer; Netherlands	Marita Lindahl; Finland	Gerti Daub; Germany	Geneviève Zanetti; France	Sonia Hamilton; England	Not awarded	Not awarded	Baden-Baden, Germany	15
1958	Johanna Ehrenstrasser; Austria	Dagmar Herner; Germany	Annie Simplot; France	Lucienne Struve; Holland	Pirkko Mannola; Finland	Not awarded	Not awarded	Istanbul, Turkey	15
1959	Christine Spatzier; Austria	Nicole Perin; France	Maria Grazia Buccella; Italy	Carmela Künzel; Germany	Petra Poul; Holland	Not awarded	Not awarded	Palermo, Italy	15
1960	Anna Ranalli; Italy	Rita Simon; Germany	Monica Abrahamsson; Sweden	Luise Kammermeier; Austria	Brigitte Barazer de Lannurien; France	Not awarded	Not awarded	Beirut, Lebanon	17
1961	Ingrun Helgard Möckel; Germany	Arlette Dobson; England	Ingrid Andersson; Sweden	Maria Del Carmen Cervera Fernández Núñez; Spain	Yvette Suzanne Dégremont; France	Not awarded	Not awarded	Beirut, Lebanon	17
1962	Maruja García Nicoláu; Spain	Birgitte Heiberg; Denmark	Kaarina Leskinen; Finland	Catharina "Rina" Lodders; Holland	Brigitta Lundberg; Sweden	Not awarded	Not awarded	Beirut, Lebanon	17
1963	Mette Stenstad; Norway	Diane Tanner; Switzerland	Aino Korwa; Denmark	Grete Qviberg; Sweden	Marja-Liisa Ståhlberg; Finland	Not awarded	Not awarded	Beirut, Lebanon	18
1964	Elly Koot; Netherlands	Marion Sibylle Zota; Germany	Siv Märta Åberg; Sweden	Edith Noël; France	Rosa María Ruiz; Spain	Not awarded	Not awarded	Beirut, Lebanon	17
1965	Juliana Herm; Germany	Virpi Liisa Miettinen; Finland	Ingrid Norrman; Sweden	Alicia Borrás; Spain	Yvonne Hanne Ekman; Denmark	Not awarded	Not awarded	Nice, France	18
1966	Maria Dornier; France	Eva Rieck (tied); Austria Hedy Frick (tied); Switzerland	Rafaela Roque Sánchez; Spain	Satu Charlotta Östring; Finland	Tove-Regina Neitzel; Germany	Not awarded	Not awarded	Nice, France	18
1967	Paquita Pérez; Spain	Irene van Campenhout; Holland	Daniela Giordano; Italy	Annika Hemminge; Sweden	Yelda Gurani; Turkey	Toula Galani; Greece	Ritva Helena Lehto; Finland	Nice, France	20
1968	Leena Brusiin; Finland	Brigitte Krüger; Austria	Anne-Christine Kahnberg; Sweden	Roswitha Moesi; Germany	Tone Knaran; Norway	Not awarded	Not awarded	Kinshasa, Congo	21
1969	Saša Zajc; Yugoslavia	Jeanne Perfeldt; Denmark	Elke Hein; Germany	Harriet Marita Eriksson; Finland	Maria Amparo Rodrigo Lorenzo; Spain	Ulla Adsten; Sweden	Patricia "Pia" Ingrid Walker; Norway	Rabat, Morocco	21
1970	Noelia Alfonso; Spain	Ana Maria Diozo Lucas; Portugal	Anna Zamboni; Italy	Stephanie Flatow; Holland	Vivi Alexopoulou; Greece	Not awarded	Not awarded	Piraeus, Greece	20
1971	Filiz Vural; Turkey	Ursula Illich; Austria	Lena Arvidsson; Sweden	Myriam Stocco; France	Laura Mulder-Smid; Holland	Not awarded	Not awarded	Tunis, Tunisia	21
1972	Monika Sarp; West Germany	Elisabeth Ire Johnson; Sweden	Ursula Pacher; Austria	Mary Ann Best; Malta	Jennifer McAdam; England	Not awarded	Not awarded	Estoril, Portugal	23
1973	Anke Groot; Netherlands	Amparo Muñoz Quesada; Spain	Sicta Vana Papadaki; Greece	Christiane Devisch; Belgium	Barbara Schöttli; Switzerland	Not awarded	Not awarded	Kitzbühel, Austria	18
1974	Maria Saavedra; Spain	Ana Paula Da Silva Freitas; Portugal	Johanna Raunio; Finland	Gerarda "Gemma" Sophia Balm; Netherlands	Kathleen Ann Celeste Anders; England	Unknown; Switzerland	Not awarded	Vienna, Austria	19
1975	Originally scheduled to take place in Beirut, Lebanon but was later cancelled due to the Lebanese Civil War.								
1976	Riitta Väisänen; Finland	Isabella Fischbacher; Switzerland	Lucie Visser; Netherlands	Melina Michailidou; Greece	Mary Kirkwood; Scotland	Not awarded	Not awarded	Rhodes, Greece	22
1977	No pageant was held								
1978	Eva Düringer; Austria	Dagmar Winkler; Germany	Sarah Louise Long; England	Gudbjörg Wilhjalmsdóttir; Iceland	Maarit Ryhänen; Finland	Not awarded	Not awarded	Helsinki, Finland	15
1979	No pageant was held								
1980	Karin Zorn; Austria	Christine Linda Bernadette Cailliau; Belgium	María Dolores "Lola" Forner Toro; Spain	Christina Bolinder; Sweden	Anette Stai; Norway	Not awarded	Not awarded	Puerto de la Cruz, Spain	20
1981	Anne Larsen; Denmark	Ingrid Schouten; Netherlands	Anna Maria Kanakis; Italy	Eva-Lena Lundgren; Sweden	Eija Helena Korolainen; Finland	Not awarded	Not awarded	Birmingham, United Kingdom	21
1982	Nazlı Deniz Kuruoğlu; Turkey	Annelie Sjöberg; Sweden	Cristina Cottrell; Spain	Caroline Williams; Wales	Ana Wilson; Portugal	Not awarded	Not awarded	Istanbul, Turkey	23
1983	No pageant was held								
1984	Neşe Erberk; Turkey	Fredérique Leroy; France	Sanna Marita Pekkala; Finland	Françoise Bostoen; Belgium	Loana Radecki; West Germany	Not awarded	Not awarded	Bad Gastein, Austria	25
1985	Juncal Rivero; Spain	Anke Symkowitz; West Germany	Brigitte Bergman; Netherlands	Zoi Elmalioti; Greece	Lucienne Thiebaud; Switzerland	Not awarded	Not awarded	Mainz, Germany	23
1986–1987	No pageant was held								
1988	Michela Rocco di Torrepadula; Italy	Ewa Monika Nowosadko; Poland	Şebnem Tan; Turkey	Magnea Lovisa Magnusdóttir; Iceland	Limor Magen; Israel	Not awarded	Not awarded	Ragusa, Italy	23
1989–1990	No pageant was held								
1991	Susanne Petry (Dethroned); Germany	Katerina Michalopoulou (Assumed); Greece	Silvia Maria Jato Núñez; Spain	Defne Samyeli; Turkey	Unknown; Czechoslovakia	Not awarded	Not awarded	Dakar, Senegal	27
1992	Marina Tsintikidou; Greece	Pavlina Baburkova; Czechoslovakia	Banu Sagnak; Turkey	Kirsi-Mari Ketola; Finland	Ravit Kanfi; Turkey	Not awarded	Not awarded	Athens, Greece	32
1993	Arzum Onan; Turkey	Yuliya Alekseyeva; Russia	Dana Avrish; Israel	Ana Maria Pérez Ayllón; Spain	Svala Björk Arnardóttir; Iceland	Not awarded	Not awarded	Istanbul, Turkey	31
1994	Lilach Ben-Simon; Israel	Didem Uzel; Turkey	Nataliy Shvachiy; Ukraine	Amanda Louise Johnson; England	Pamela van den Berg; Holland	Not awarded	Not awarded	Istanbul, Turkey	33
1995	Monika Žídková; Czech Republic	Ingeborg Dossland; Norway	Sofie Tocklin; Sweden	Monika Zguro; Albania	Ilmira Shamsutdinova; Russia	Not awarded	Not awarded	Istanbul, Turkey	36
1996	Marie-Claire Harrison; England	Yelena Shcherbak; Belarus	Kim Roslikov; Israel	Nonie Dounia; Greece	Aurelia Barrera Escalera; Spain	Not awarded	Not awarded	Tirana, Albania	35
1997	Isabelle Darras; Greece	Agnieszka Zielinska; Poland	Patricia Jañez Rodríguez; Spain	Flavia Mantovan; Italy	Natalija Bedekovic; Croatia	Not awarded	Not awarded	Kyiv, Ukraine	29
1998	No pageant was held								
1999	Yelena Rogozhina; Russia	Cristina Cellai; Italy	Kadri Väljaots; Estonia	Minna Lehtinen; Finland	Jitka Kocurová; Czech Republic	Not awarded	Not awarded	Beirut, Lebanon	39
2000	No pageant was held								
2001	Élodie Gossuin; France	Adriana Gerczew; Poland	Karla Milinovic; Croatia	Hatice Sendil; Turkey	Verónica Martín García; Spain	Not awarded	Not awarded	Beirut, Lebanon	33
2002	Svetlana Koroleva; Russia	Natascha Vanessa Börger Sevilla; Germany	Esra Eron; Turkey	Kim Kötter; Holland	Adina Dimitru; Romania	Not awarded	Not awarded	Beirut, Lebanon	35
2003	Zsuzsanna Laky; Hungary	Miroslava Luberdova; Slovak Republic	Sanja Papić; Serbia and Montenegro	Patricia Ledesma Nieto; Spain	Marta Matyjasik; Poland	Not awarded	Not awarded	Nogent-sur-Marne, France	36
2004	No pageant was held								
2005	Shermine Shahrivar; Germany	Luysya Tovmasyan; Armenia	Cindy Fabre; France	Laura Shields; England	Tatiana Keremeryova; Slovak Republic	Not awarded	Not awarded	Paris, France	36
2006	Alexandra Rosenfeld; France	Alena Avramenko; Ukraine	Laura Ojeda Ramírez; Spain	Katarzyna Weronika Borowicz; Poland	Yuliya Sindzeyeva; Belarus	Not awarded	Not awarded	Kyiv, Ukraine	33
2007-2015	No pageant was held								
2016	Diana Starkova; France	Sabina Michelle Schneider; Germany	Yuliya Parkhomenko; Latvia	Not awarded	Not awarded	Not awarded	Not awarded	Beirut, Lebanon	30
2017	Diana Kubasova; Latvia	Alena Senatorova; Germany	Nina Goryniuk; Ukraine	Not awarded	Not awarded	Not awarded	Not awarded	Seoul, South Korea	26
2018	Anna Shornikova (tied); Ukraine Anastasiya Ammosova (tied); Russia	Nika Kar; Slovenia	Agatha Maximova; France	Not awarded	Not awarded	Not awarded	Not awarded	Paris, France	Unknown
2019	Andrea de las Heras; Spain	Julia Alexandratou; Greece	Linda Novica; Latvia	Tauany Aparecida Coelho Machado; France	Karolina Dobrihina; Estonia	Not awarded	Not awarded	Cannes, France	Unknown
2020	Lara Jalloh; France	Xhensila Shaba; Albania	Marine Ayala; Spain	Sheida Rahni; United Kingdom	Not awarded	Not awarded	Not awarded	Paris, France	Unknown
2021	Anastasia Prodanov; Serbia	Amanda Ford; Spain	Diana Volkova; Russia	Leorita Kendusi; Albania	Katarzyna Kowalska; Poland	Chiara Lombardi; Italy	Anna Hoffmann; Germany	Cannes, France	25

=== Winners by countries and territories ===
Country/Territory	Titles	Year(s)
France	9	1931, 1948, 1949, 1954 (assumed), 1966, 2001, 2006, 2016, 2020
Spain	8	1935, 1936, 1962, 1967, 1970, 1974, 1985, 2019
Germany	7	1954 (dethroned), 1956, 1961, 1965, 1972, 1991 (dethroned), 2005
Finland	6	1934, 1937, 1938, 1955, 1968, 1976
Turkey	5	1952, 1971, 1982, 1984, 1993, 2024
Austria	5	1950, 1958, 1959, 1978, 1980
Greece	4	1930, 1991 (assumed), 1992, 1997
Italy	4	1939, 1953, 1960, 1988
Russia	4	1933, 1999, 2002, 2018
Netherlands	3	1957, 1964, 1973
Hungary	2	1929, 2003
Norway	2	1963, 1986
Denmark	2	1932, 1981
Yugoslavia	2	1927, 1969
Serbia	1	2021
Ukraine	1	2018
Latvia	1	2017
England	1	1996
Czech Republic	1	1995
Israel	1	1994
Belgium	1	1947

== Gallery ==
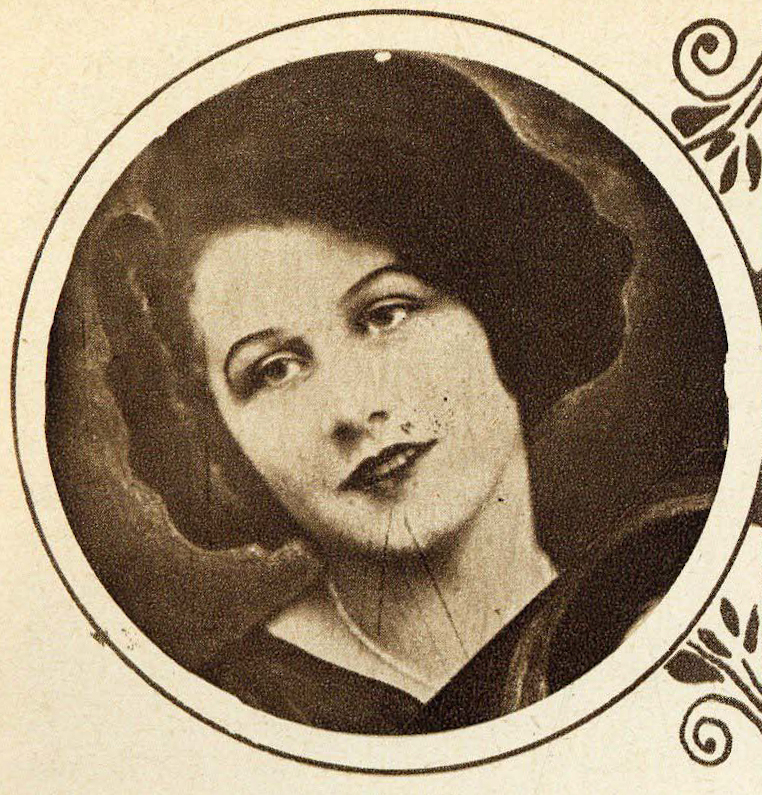
Miss Europe 1927, Štefica Vidačić

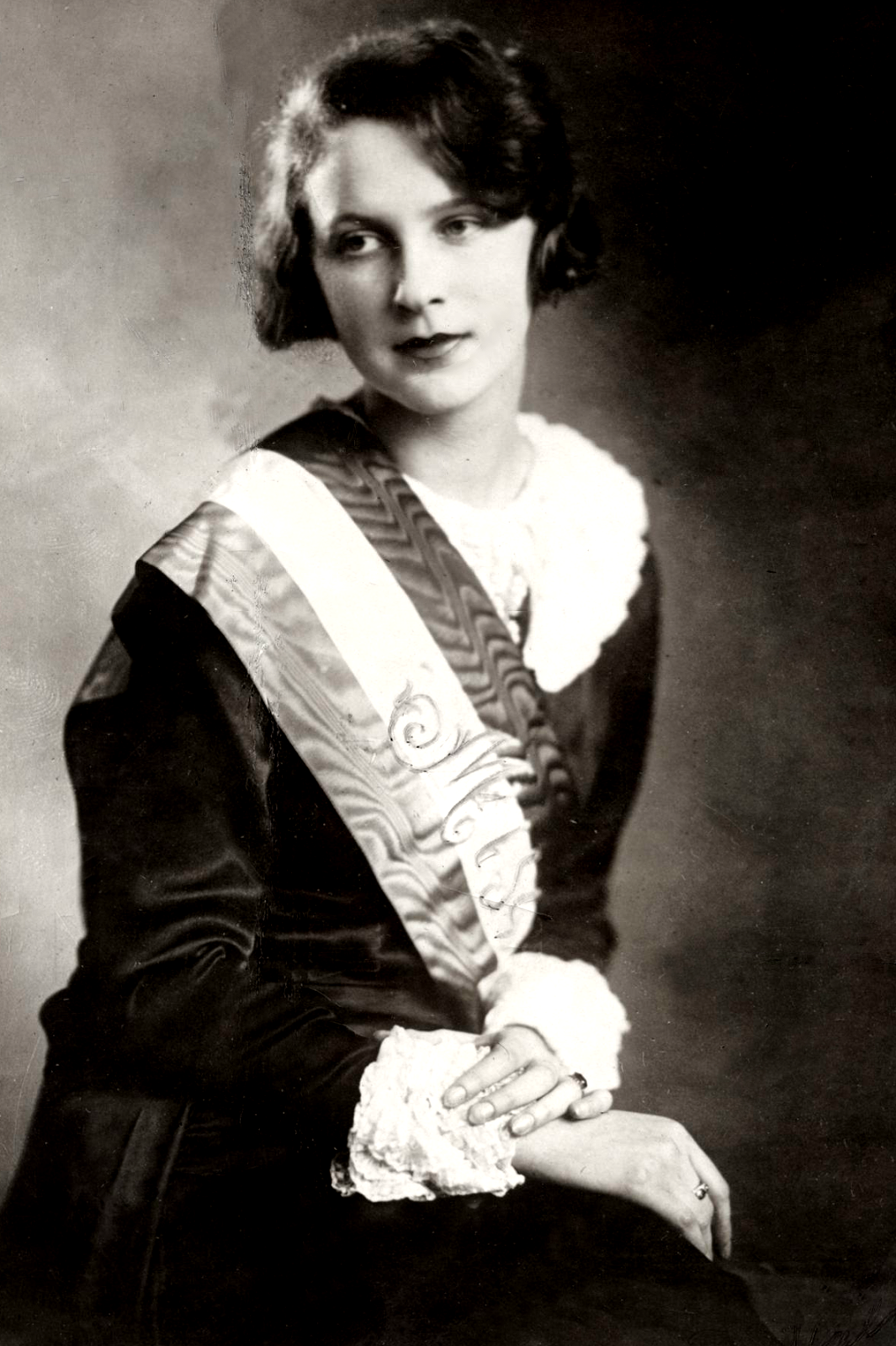
Miss Europe 1929, Erzsébet "Böske" Simon

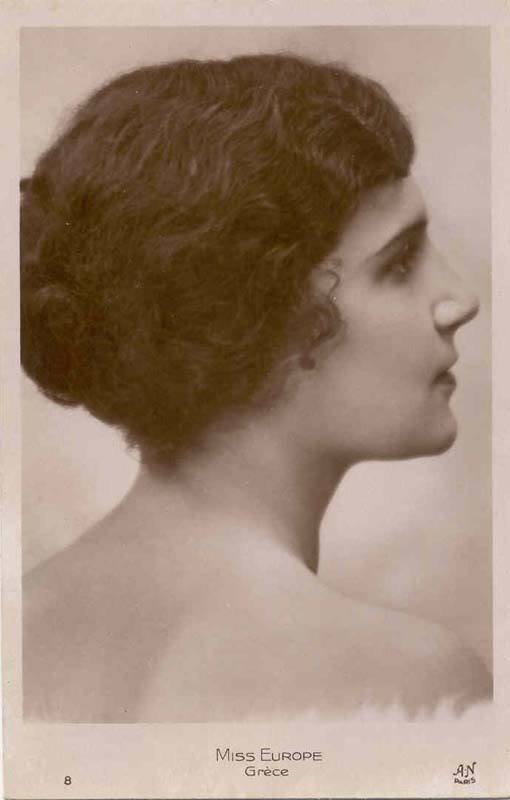
Miss Europe 1930, Aliki Diplarakou

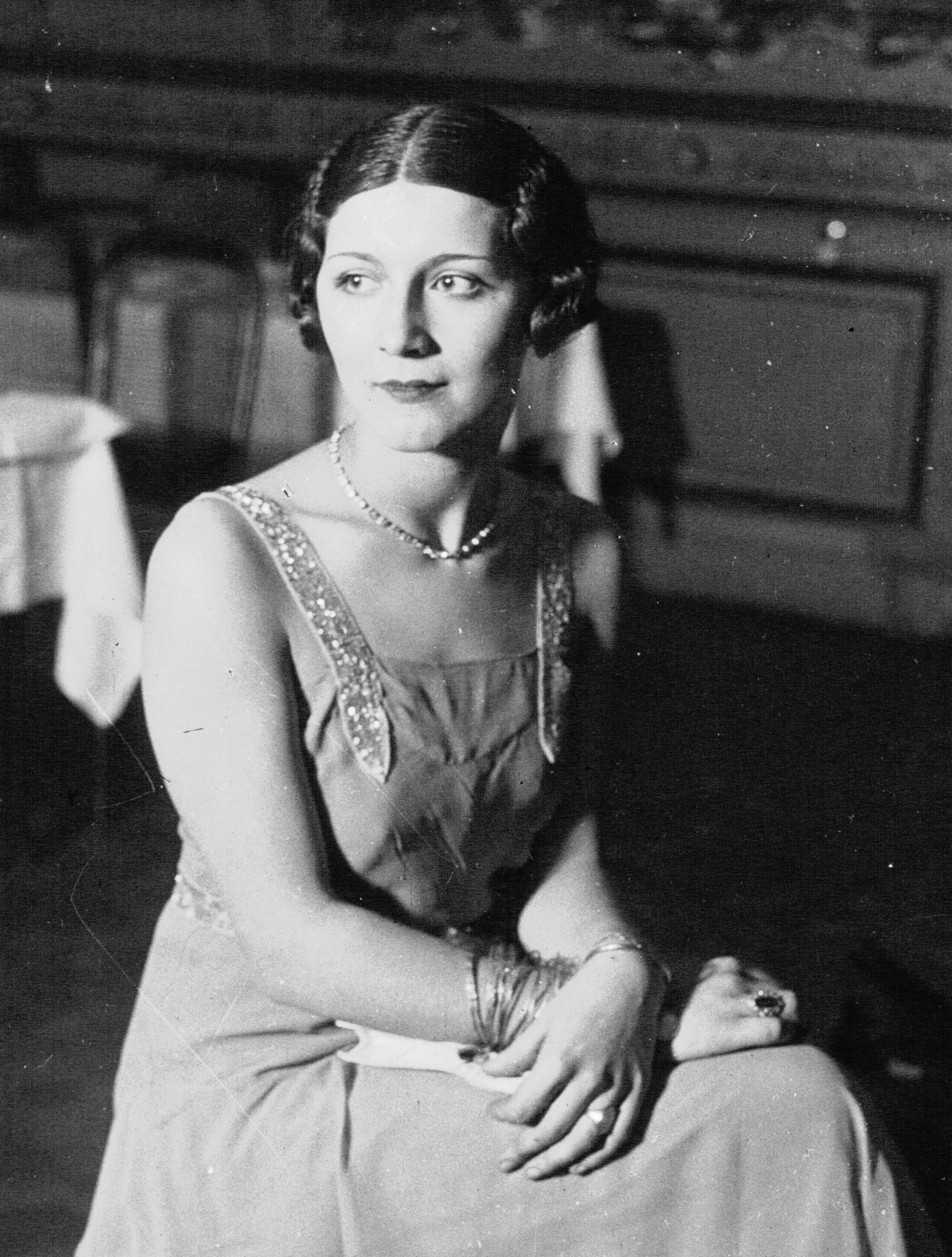
Miss Europe 1931, Jeanne Juilla

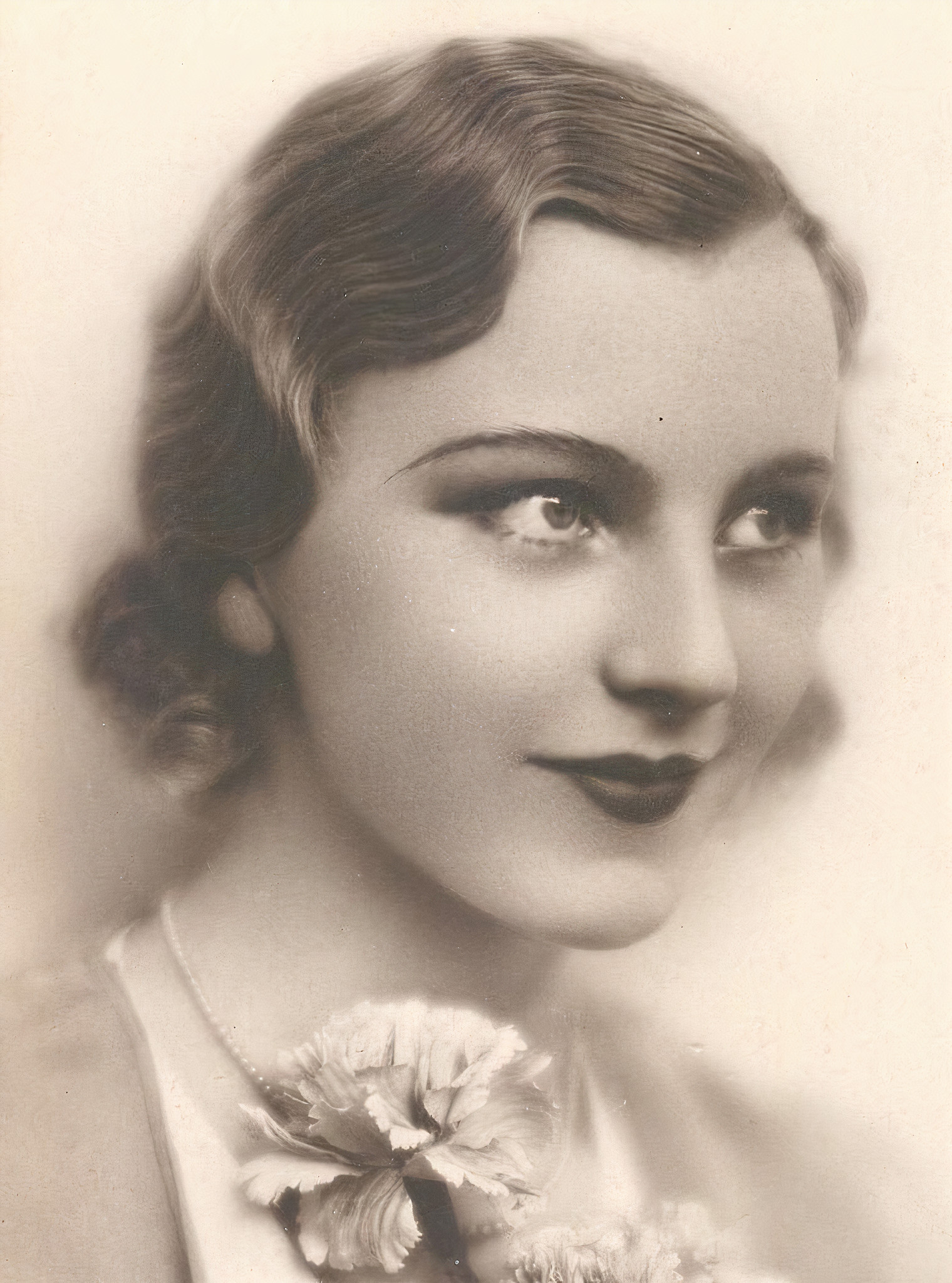
Miss Europe 1932, Åse Clausen

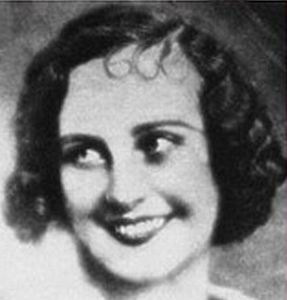
Miss USSR, Tatyana Maslova 1933; Miss Europe 1933

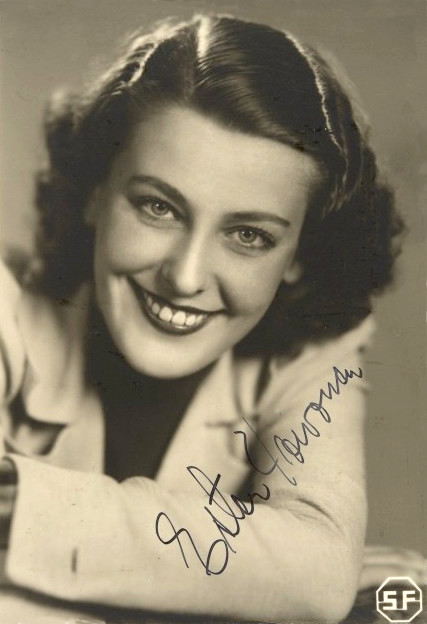
Miss Europe 1934, Ester Toivonen

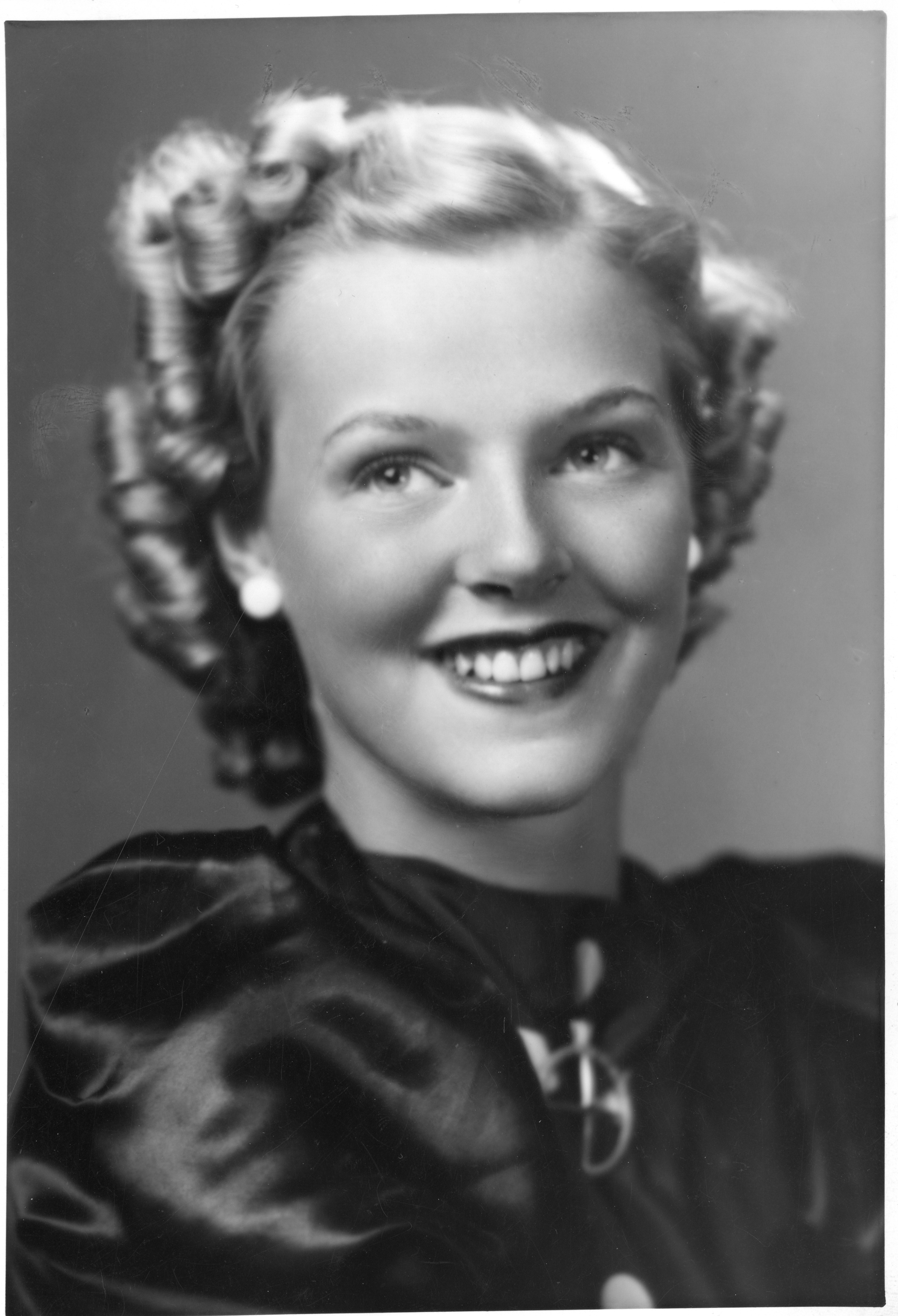
Miss Europe 1937, Britta Wikström

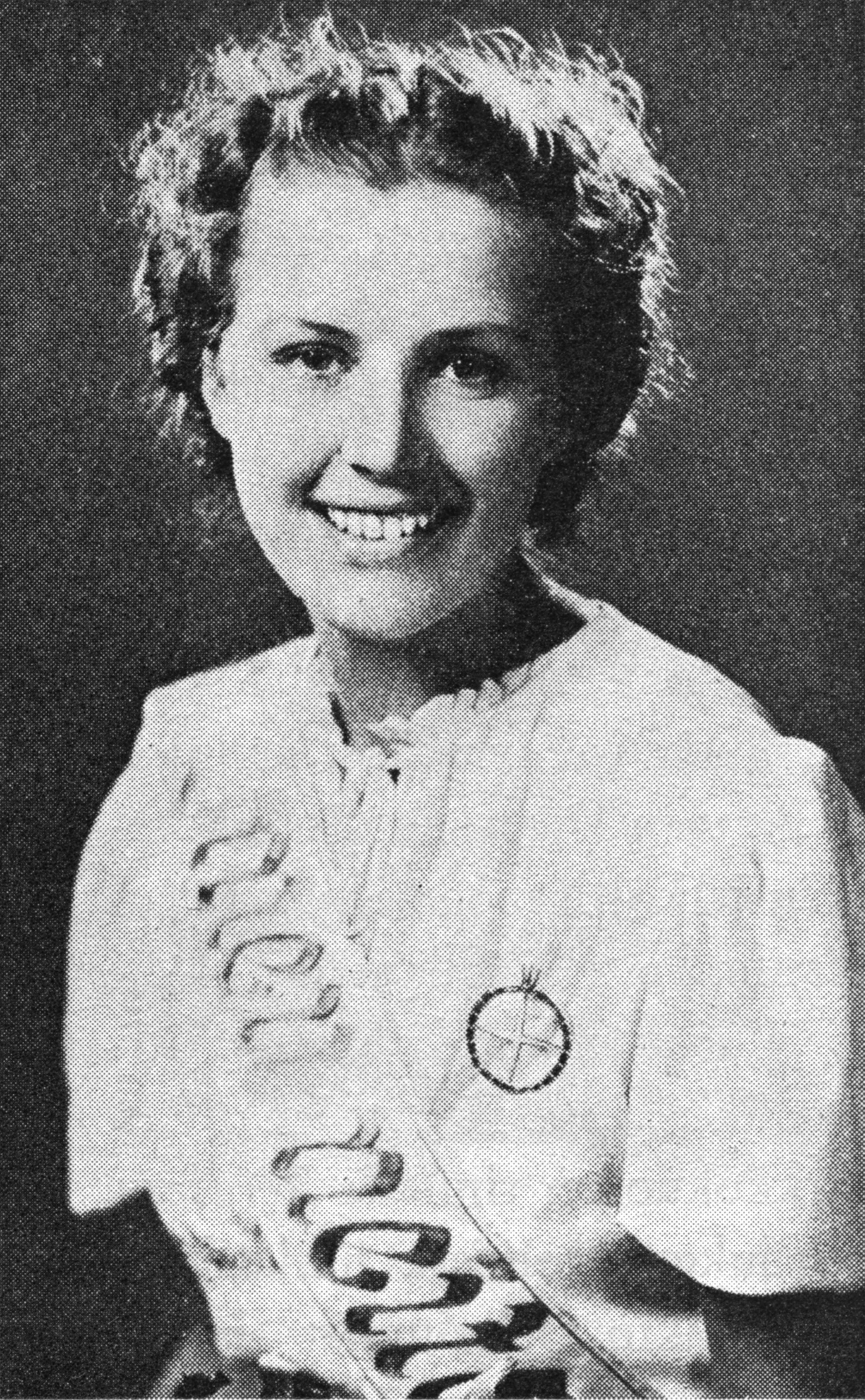
Miss Europe 1938, Sirkka Salonen

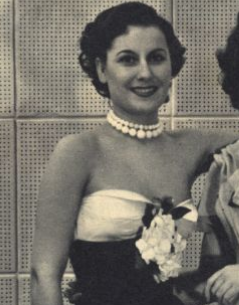
Miss Europe 1948, Jacqueline Donny

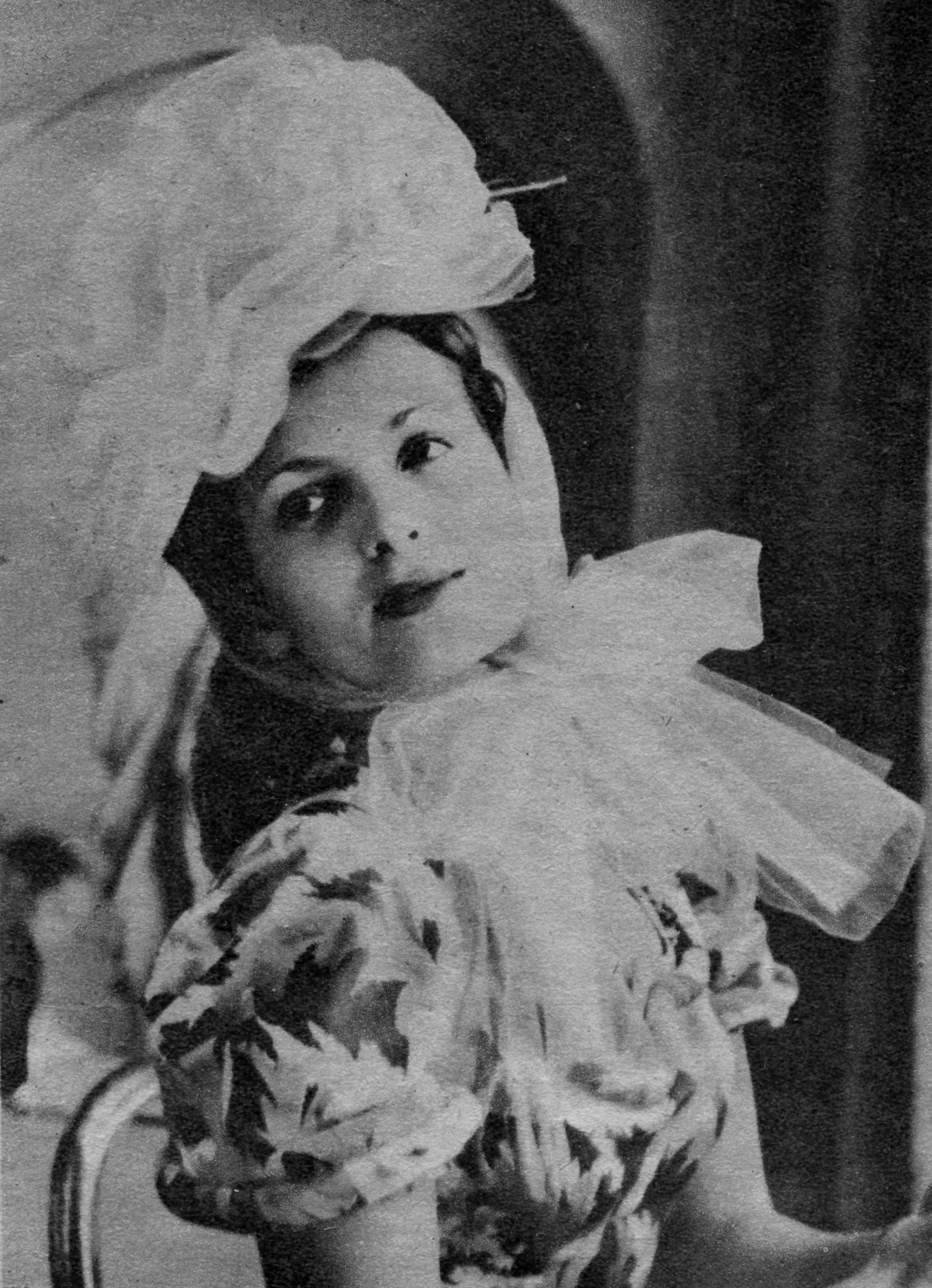
Miss Europe 1949, Juliette Figueras

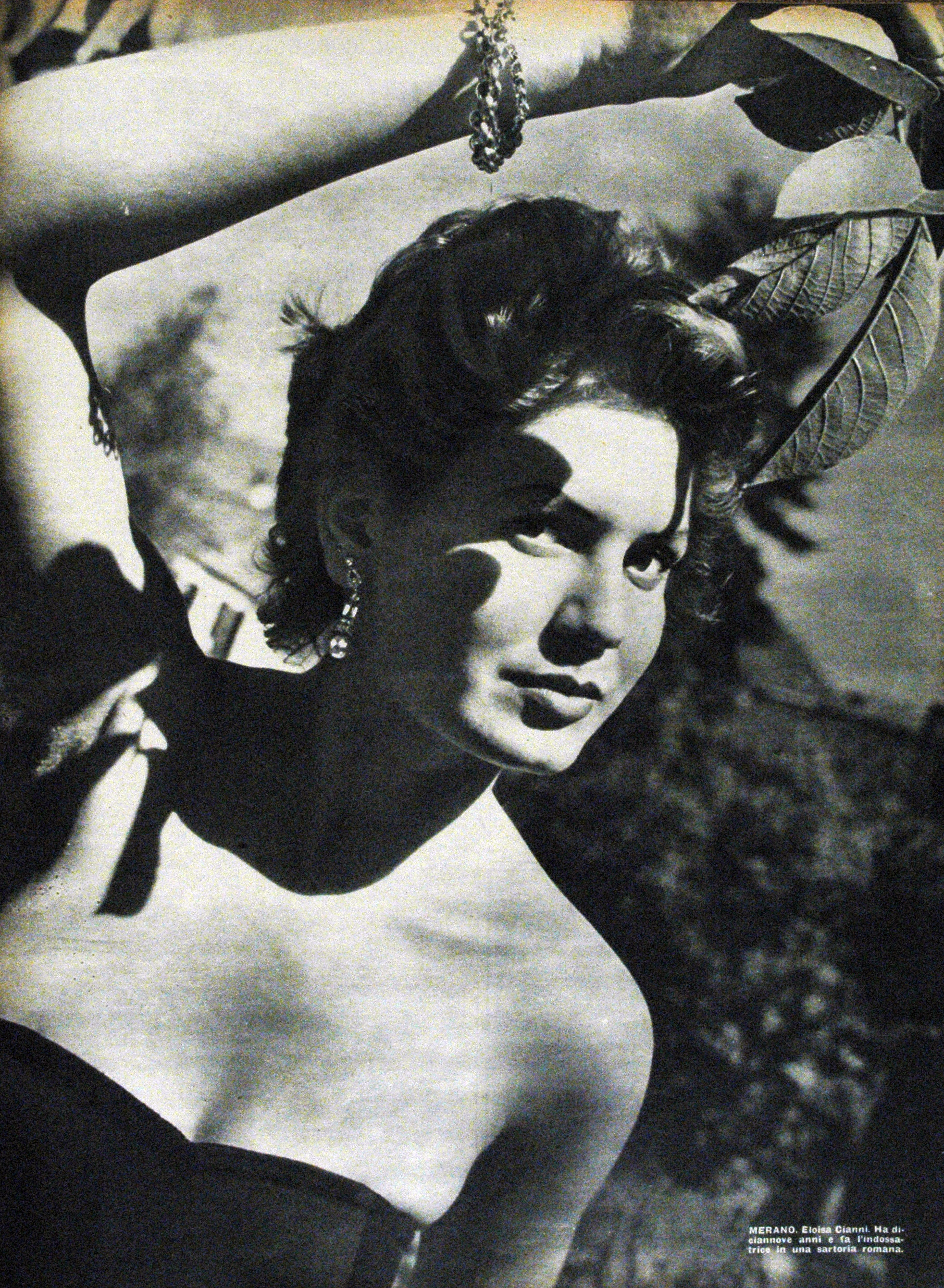
Miss Europe 1953, Eloisa Cianni

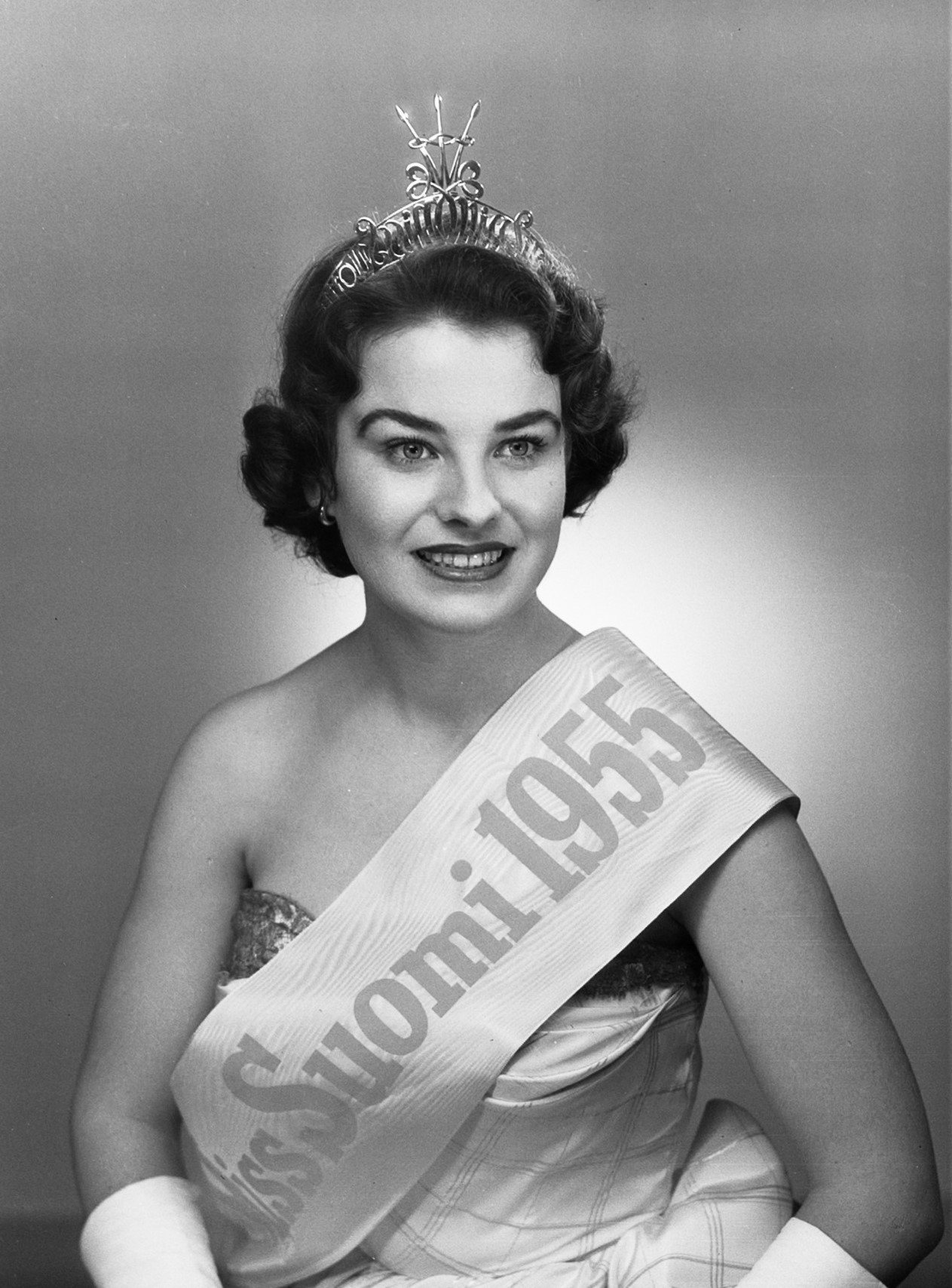
Miss Europe 1955, Inga-Britt Söderberg

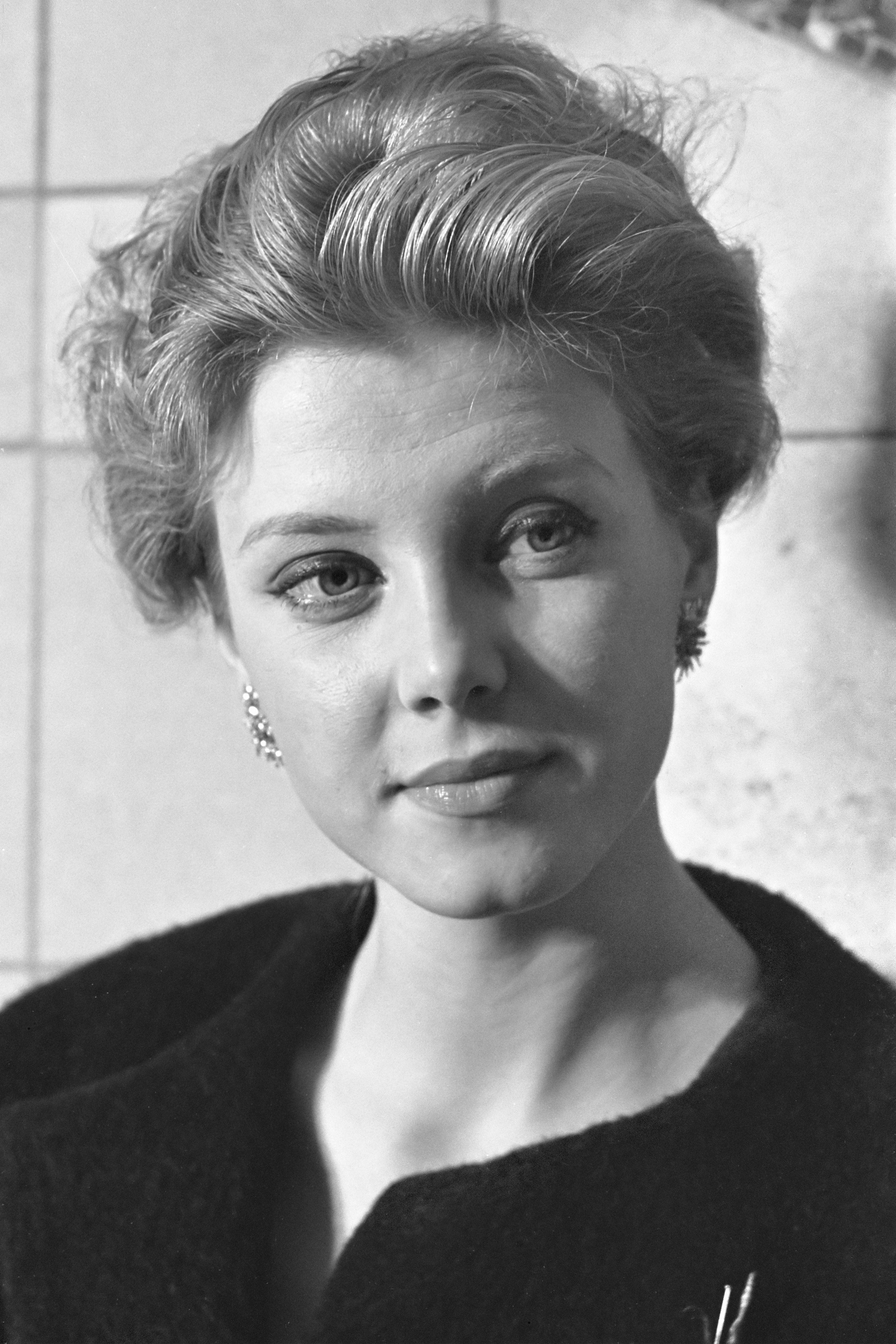
Miss Europe 1957, Corine Rottschäfer

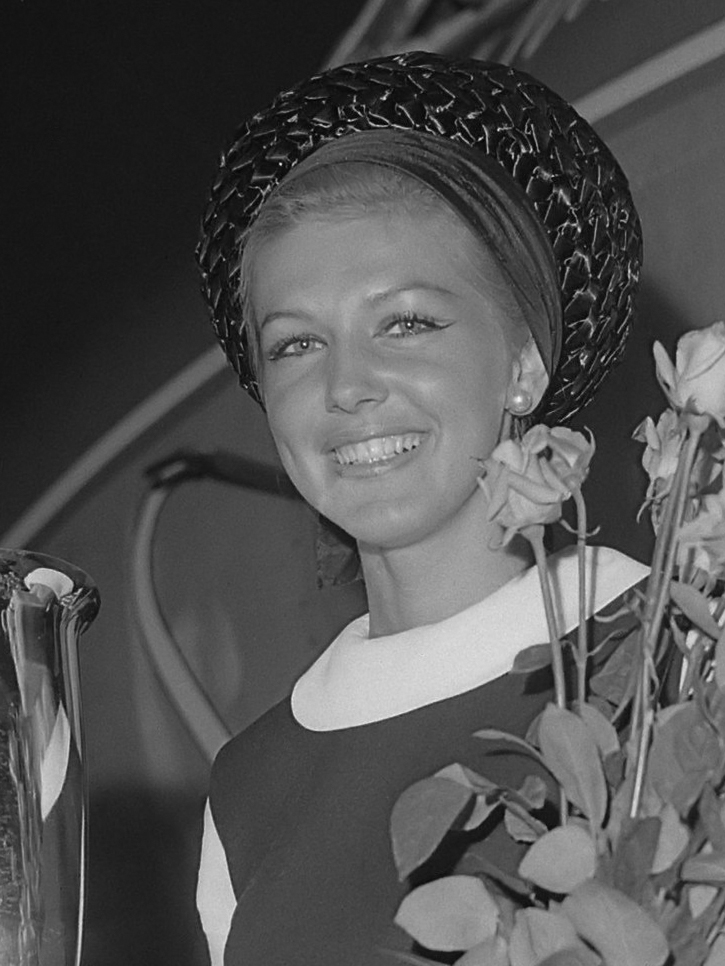
Miss Europe 1964, Elly Koot

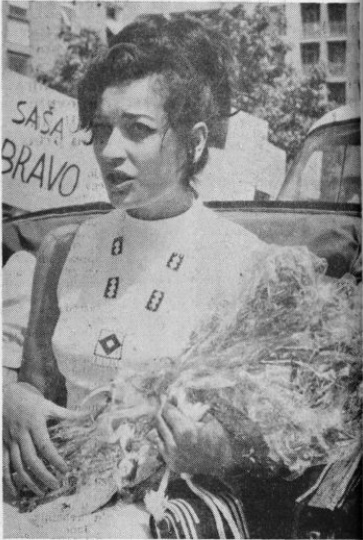
Miss Europe 1969, Saša Zajc

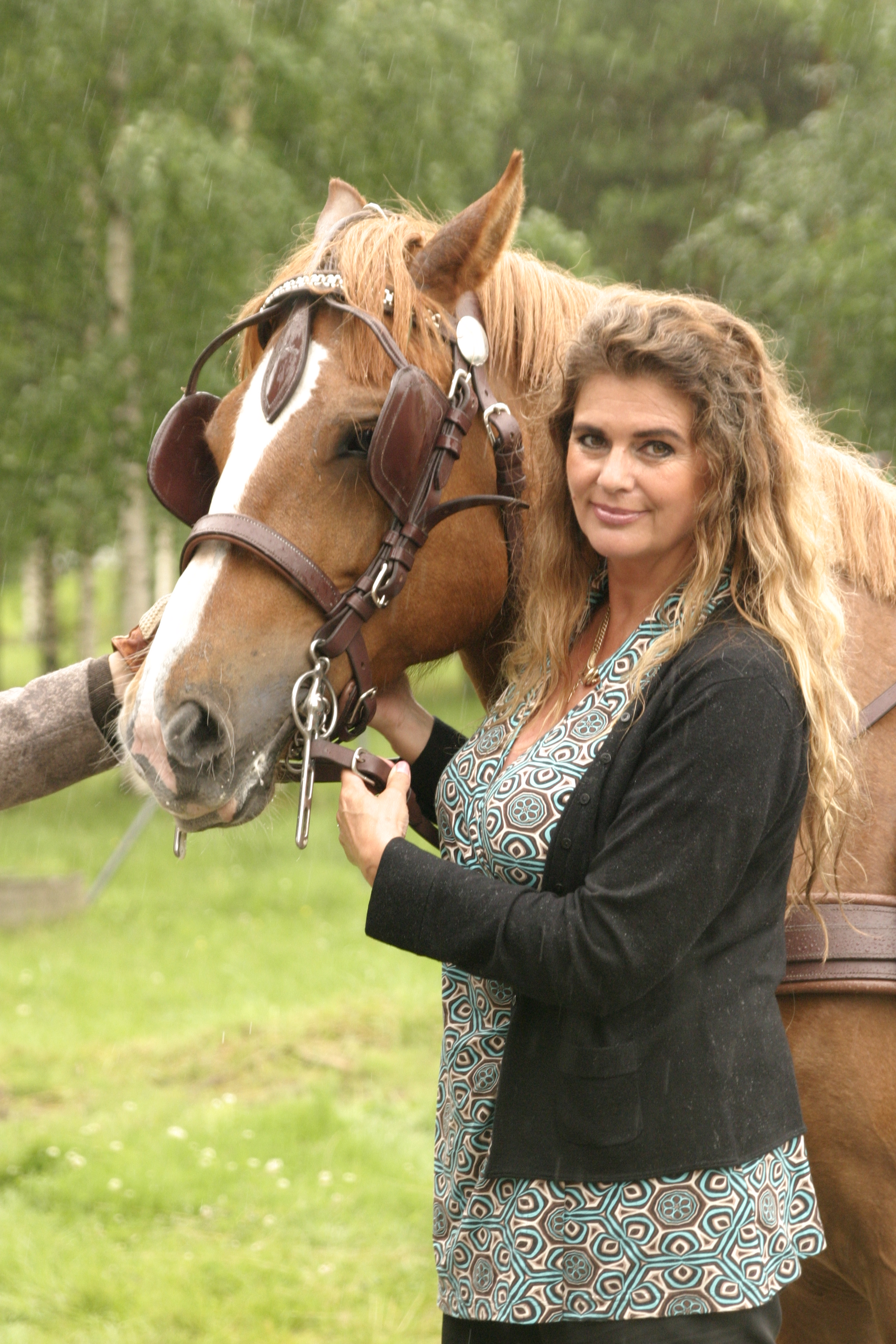
Miss Europe 1976, Riitta Väisänen (pictured in 2007)

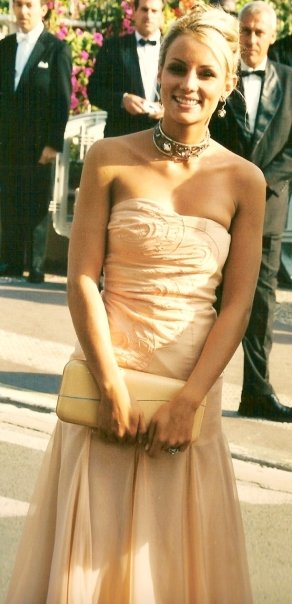
Miss Europe 2001, Elodie Gossuin

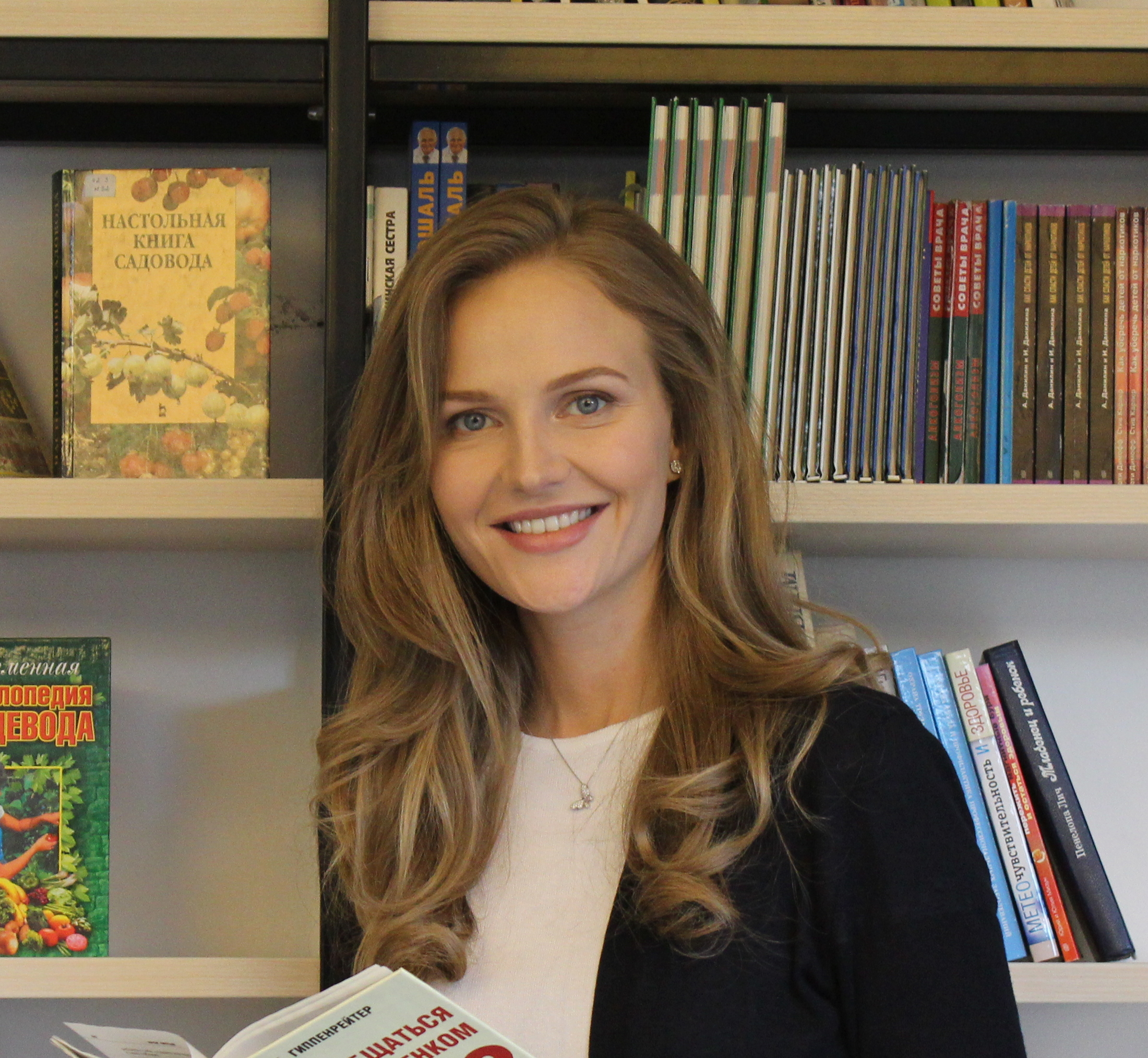
Miss Europe 2002, Svetlana Koroleva

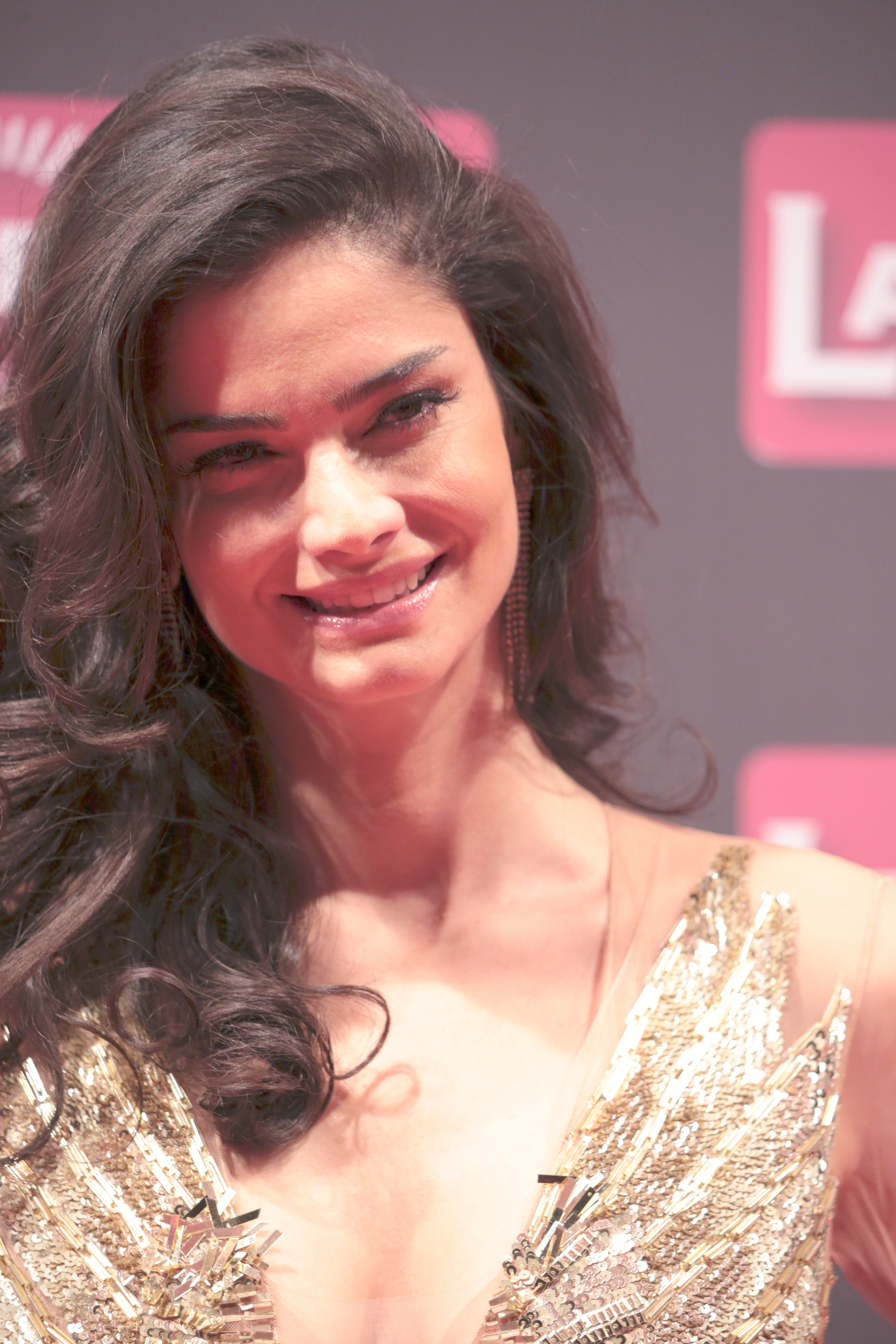
Miss Europe 2005, Shermine Shahrivar

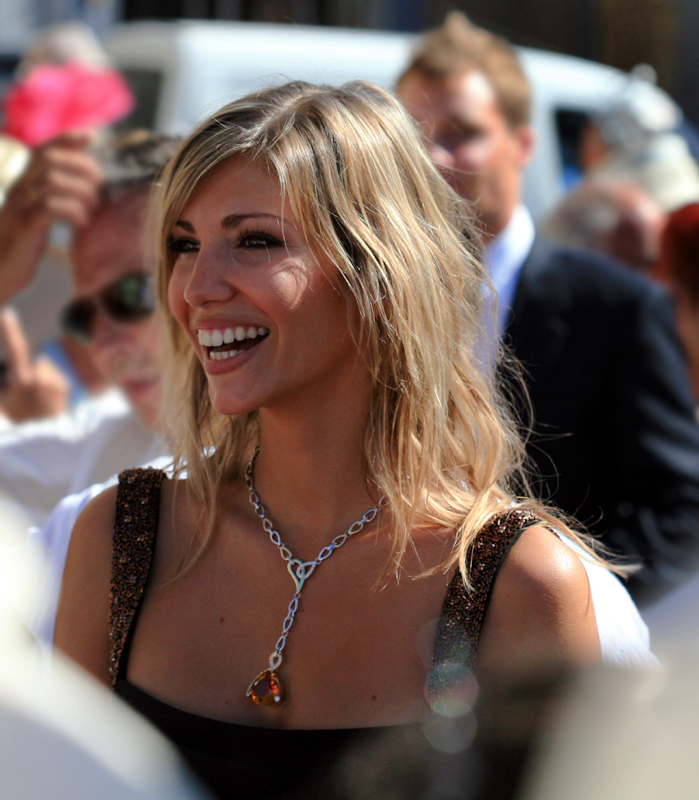
Miss Europe 2006, Alexandra Rosenfeld

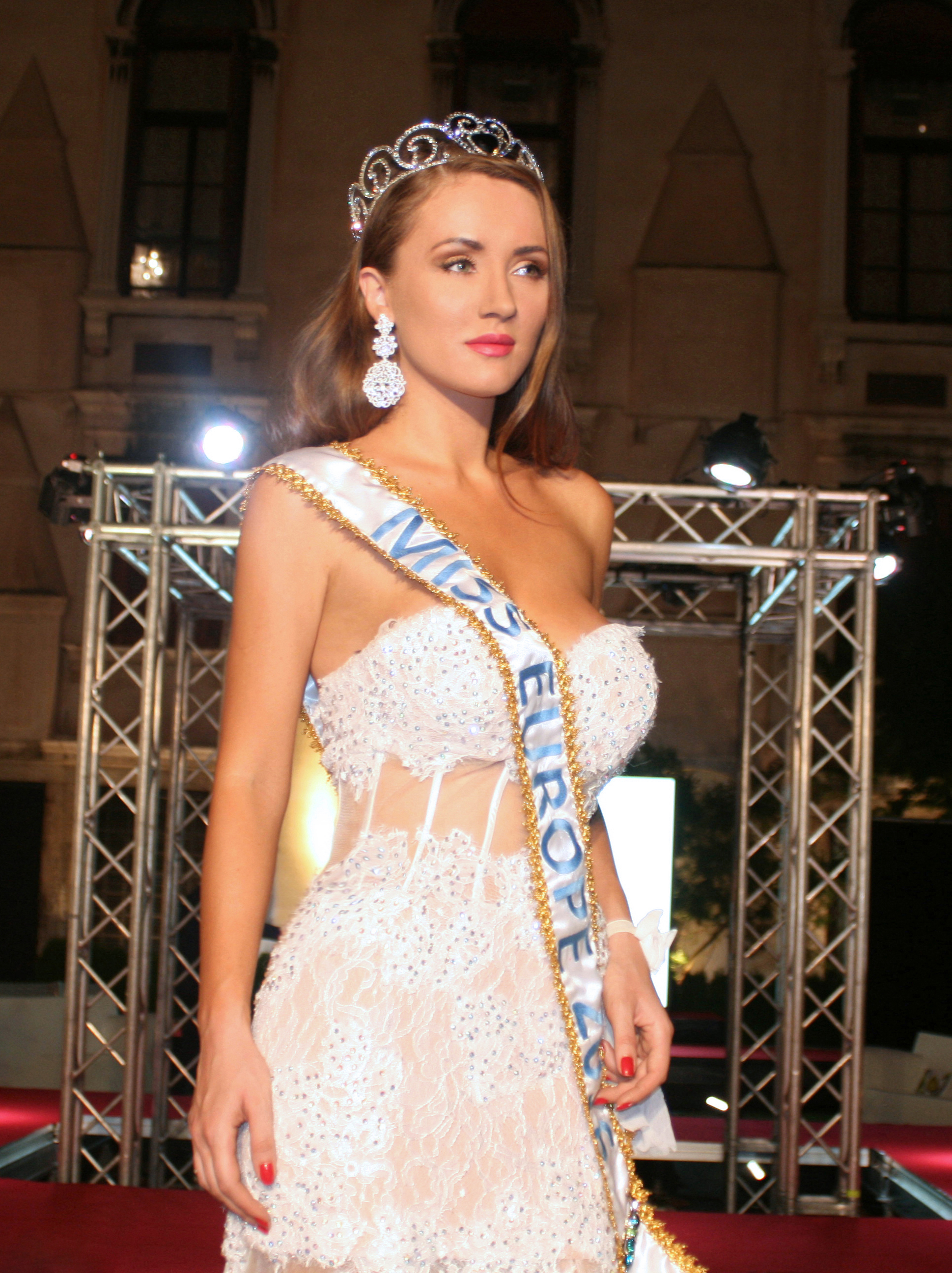
Miss Europe 2016, Diana Starkova

== "Comité Officiel et International Miss Europe" competition ==
From 1951 to 2002 there was a rival Miss Europe competition organized by the "Comité Officiel et International Miss Europe". This was founded in 1950 by Jean Raibaut in Paris, the headquarters later moved to Marseille. The winners wore different titles like Miss Europe, Miss Europa or Miss Europe International.

Year	Miss Europa	1st runner-up	2nd runner-up	3rd runner-up	4th runner-up	5th runner-up	Location	Entrants
1951	Jacqueline Grenton; Switzerland	Giovanna Mazzotti; Italy	Elizabeth Mayerhoffer (tied); Sweden Monique Vallier (tied); France	Not awarded	Not awarded	Not awarded	Palermo, Italy	7
1952	Judy Breen; Great Britain	Anita Ekberg; Sweden	Elisabeth van Proosdij; Holland	Ingeborg Freuis; Austria	Andrea Bouillon; Belgium	Vera Marks; Germany	Amsterdam, Netherlands	10
1953	Lore Felger; Austria	Anne Marie Thistler; Sweden	Patricia Butler (tied); England Chantal Mabileau (tied); France	Unknown	Unknown	Unknown	Amsterdam, Netherlands	9
1954–1956	No pageant was held							
1957	Ingrid Weiss; Germany	Not awarded	Not awarded	Not awarded	Not awarded	Not awarded	Paris, France	2
1958	Evelyne Ricket; France	Hajett Rekik; Albania	Not awarded	Not awarded	Not awarded	Not awarded	Amiens, France	8
1959	Sophie d'Estrade; France	Eve Dortant; Belgium	Karin Gabor; Germany	Not awarded	Not awarded	Not awarded	Meaux, France	12
1960–1966	No pageant was held							
1967	Berrit Kvorning; Denmark	Unknown	Unknown	Unknown	Unknown	Unknown	Unknown	Unknown
1968	Regina Koeppen; Germany	Unknown	Unknown	Unknown	Unknown	Unknown	Unknown	Unknown
1969	No pageant was held							
1970	Marie Korner; Germany	Unknown	Unknown	Unknown	Unknown	Unknown	Nice, France	1+
1971	Laurence Vallée; France	Unknown	Unknown	Unknown	Unknown	Unknown	Florence, Italy	1+
1972	No pageant was held							
1973	Diana Scapolan; Italy	Veronique Mercier; Monaco	Linda Hooks; Great Britain	Not awarded	Not awarded	Not awarded	Barcelona, Spain	16
1974	Wencke Stehen; Norway	Maria del Rocío Martín Madrigal; Spain	Dany Coutelier; Monaco	Not awarded	Not awarded	Not awarded	Gran Canaria, Spain	19
1975	Vivianne Van der Cauter; Belgium	Dany Voissin-Renucci; France	Carmen García; Spain	Not awarded	Not awarded	Not awarded	Monaco	19
1976	Maria Teresa Maldonado Valle; Spain	Nanny van der Kuyl; Holland	Nuria Berruezo; Andorra	Danielle Payan; Monaco	Torill Mariann Larsen; Iceland	Not awarded	Andorra la Vella, Andorra	23
1977	No pageant was held							
1978	Barbara-Ann Neefs; Holland	Helene Hornfeldt; Norway	Nazan Saatçi; Turkey	Not awarded	Not awarded	Not awarded	Reggio Emilia, Italy	22
1979–1981	No pageant was held							
1982	Unknown	Unknown	Unknown	Unknown	Unknown	Unknown	Athens, Greece	2+
1983	No pageant was held							
1984	Trine Elisabeth Mørk; Norway	Susana Alguacil; Spain	Rita Tóth (Tóth Rita); Hungary	Not awarded	Not awarded	Not awarded	Vienna, Austria	19
1985	No pageant was held							
1986	Rachel Margaretha Bruhn; Sweden	Cecile Lartique; France	Csilla Andrea Molnár; Hungary	Begona Marcos; Spain	Elfriede Haindl; Austria	Not awarded	Valletta, Malta	24
1987	Sandrina Rossi; France	Unknown	Unknown	Unknown	Unknown	Unknown	Frankfurt, Germany	16+
1988–1991	No pageant was held							
1992	Yolanda Marcos Gonzales; Spain	Anne Jandera; France	Elena Liafou (tied); Greece Tatiana Zaghet (tied); Italy	Not awarded	Not awarded	Not awarded	Catania, Italy	12+
1993–1995	No pageant was held							
1996	Mimmi Gunnarsson (Dethroned); Sweden	Jenni Rautawaara (Assumed); Finland	Kelly Hodson; Scotland	Not awarded	Not awarded	Not awarded	İzmir, Turkey	30
1997	No pageant was held							
1998	Nataša Spasojević; Yugoslavia	Unknown	Unknown	Unknown	Unknown	Unknown	Unknown	Unknown
1999	Anna Maria Tudorache; Romania	Eva Maria Blanco Games; Spain	Not awarded	Not awarded	Not awarded	Not awarded	Taormina, Italy	34
2000–2001	No pageant was held							
2002	Amandine Hatzithomas; Greece	Malgorzata Ksiazek; Poland	Anita Gaal; Hungary	Not awarded	Not awarded	Not awarded	Warsaw, Poland	48

=== Winners by countries and territories ===
Country/Territory	Titles	Year(s)
France	5	1953, 1958, 1959, 1971, 1987
Germany	3	1957, 1968, 1970
Sweden	2	1986, 1996 (dethroned)
Spain	2	1976, 1992
Norway	2	1974, 1984
Greece	1	2002
Romania	1	1999
Yugoslavia	1	1998
Finland	1	1996 (assumed)
Holland	1	1978
Belgium	1	1975
Italy	1	1973
Denmark	1	1967
Great Britain	1	1952
Switzerland	1	1951

== Miss European Global ==
Miss European Global is a beauty pageant in which each country has a team of six girls and one girl from each team competes for Miss European Global.

- Miss European Global. on Facebook

Year	Miss European	Location	Entrants
Miss European 2000–2017
2000	Emilie Lalyssie; France	England	Unknown
2001	Wendy Cornelius; Belgium	England	Unknown
2002	Bernice; Belgium	England	Unknown
2003	Cindy; France	England	Unknown
2004	Unknown; France	England	Unknown
2005	Laura Livesey; Wales	England	Unknown
2006	Sasha Buckingham; England	England	Unknown
2007	Amy Fuller; England	England	Unknown
2008	Kathy Gysels; Belgium	England	Unknown
2009	Melissa Vingerhoed; Belgium	England	Unknown
2010	Katrina Pavia; Malta	England	Unknown
2011	Rachael Tate; Wales	England	Unknown
2012	Deona Roberson; Scotland	England	Unknown
2013	Kerry-Anne Vinson; England	England	Unknown
2014	Darciana; Portugal	England	Unknown
2015	Erma Franklin; Wales	England	Unknown
2016	Sharron; Netherlands	England	Unknown
2017	Melissa Douglas; Scotland	England	Unknown
Year	Miss European Global	Location	Entrants
Miss European Global 2018–present
2018	Claudia Cousin; England	Bredene, Belgium	15
2019	Iris-Yasmine Hulleman; Netherlands	Bredene, Belgium	10
2020			
2025			

=== Winners by countries and territories ===
Country/Territory	Titles	Year(s)
England	4	2006, 2007, 2013, 2018
Belgium	4	2001, 2002, 2008, 2009
Wales	3	2005, 2011, 2015
France	3	2000, 2003, 2004
Netherlands	2	2016, 2019
Scotland	2	2012, 2017
Portugal	1	2014
Malta	1	2010

== Mrs. Europe ==
Mrs. Europe is a large beauty competition in which delegates must prepare a report, compete in different categories, and work together to overcome challenges they face during the competition.

Year	Mrs. Europe	Mrs. European Union	1st Runner up	2nd Runner up	3rd Runner up	4th Runner up	Location	Entrants
2009	Anna Ivanova; Monaco	Unknown					Sofia, Bulgaria	Unknown
2010	Elena Karakoleva; Bulgaria	Unknown					Sofia, Bulgaria	Unknown
2011	Olena Koch; Germany	Unknown					Sofia, Bulgaria	Unknown
2012	Elena Mozoleva; Ukraine	Dofiana Focari; Moldova	Katya Rose; Bulgaria	Valeriya Verdunova; Netherlands	Carmen Rosa; Italy	Kristine Yindenblate; Latvia	Sofia, Bulgaria	14
2013	Mariya Eroshenko; Russia	Diana Pothitou; Greece	Marina Kolosova; Austria	Elena Mohammad; Crimea	Natalia Trofimova; Belarus	Iliyana Karastoyanova; Bulgaria	Sofia, Bulgaria	16
2014	Natalia Zimora Salas; Canary Islands	Svetlana Markovskaya; Poland	Heidi Pölkki; Finland	Anita Skendzich; Serbia	Cece Georgiev; Republic of Macedonia	Antonia Anakievska; Bulgaria	Sofia, Bulgaria	15
2015	Kristina Tselloeva; Russia	Natasja Roelofs; Netherlands	Tansuluu Omurzakova; Kyrgyzstan	Madeleine Vickery; Sweden	Julia Smoli; Estonia	Elena Solodunova; CIS	Sofia, Bulgaria	18
2016	Elina Butenko; Siberia	Ekaterina Pronkina; France	Anna Demirkhanyan; Caucasus	Davinia Cano; Gibraltar	Sherene Dawber; United Kingdom	Silvia Rodriguez; Spain	Sofia, Bulgaria	18
2017	Davinia Baglietto; Gibraltar	Maria Garcia; Spain	Ekaterina Levina; Russia	Yovka Gurgurieva; Bulgaria	Veronika Kelle; Hungary	Mertens Lauranne; Belgium	Sofia, Bulgaria	14
2018	Ana Pilar Suarez; Canary Islands	Julia Bakalova; Netherlands	Giovanca Afzan; Gibraltar	Alla Korotkih; Russia	Anna Stefanova; Bulgaria	Malou Soetaerts; Benelux	Sofia, Bulgaria	12
2019	Ljudmilla Karpikova; Estonia	Yana Sredkova; Bulgaria	Unknown	Unknown	Unknown	Unknown	Sofia, Bulgaria	19
2020	Inna Bykova; Ukraine	Rosica Velcheva Genova; Iberian Peninsula	Emiliana Markova; Bulgaria	Irene Peñas Ferrando; Portugal	Belen Valeriano Ramos; South Georgia Islands	Miriam Gil Alvarez; Andorra	Sofia, Bulgaria	19

=== Winners by countries and territories ===
Country/Territory	Titles	Year(s)
Ukraine	2	2012, 2020
Canary Islands	2	2014, 2018
Russia	2	2013, 2015
Estonia	1	2019
Gibraltar	1	2017
Siberia	1	2016
Germany	1	2011
Bulgaria	1	2010
Monaco	1	2009

== Miss Europe (Lebanon-based) ==
Miss Europe
- Formation: 2015; 11 years ago
- Type: Beauty pageant
- Headquarters: Beirut
- Location: Lebanon
- Official language: English; French

Year	Miss Europe	1st Runner up	2nd Runner up	3rd Runner up	4th Runner up	5th Runner up	6th Runner up	7th Runner up	Location	Entrants
2015	Linda Satilova; Latvia	Maya Tomic; Serbia	Coralie Porrovecchio; Italy	Amina Sabbah; Germany	Julia Kislitskaya; Finland	Caroline Kaya; Slovakia	Not awarded	Not awarded	Jounieh, Lebanon	21
2016	Mikaela Fotiadis; Greece	Franscesca Pepe; Malta	Iuliia Vasileva; Moldova	Laura Peto; Hungary	Veronica Avanzolini; Italy	Alena Onoprienko; Austria	Not awarded	Not awarded	Beirut, Lebanon	33
2017	Maria Slusnyte; Lithuania	Nera Lesic; Croatia	Iana Obodan; Switzerland	Saidana; Kazakhstan	Tessy Ramos; Portugal	Polina Volodei; Estonia	Not awarded	Not awarded	Beirut, Lebanon	21
2018	Luissa Burton; United Kingdom	LilIya; Lithuania	Ksenia; Russia	Yulia; Czech Republic	Liliya; Belarus	Justyna; Poland	Not awarded	Not awarded	Beirut, Lebanon	24
2019	Irina Garasymiv; Ukraine	Diana Toma; Moldova	Zlata Kozlova; Russia	Adrianna Paciorek; Poland	Susanna Yegoryan; Armenia	Victoria Delmon; France	Deana Yordanova; Bulgaria	Not awarded	Jounieh-Beirut, Lebanon	28
2020	Gaby Guha; France	Angelina Ganevic; Lithuania	Yuliia Karpets; Ukraine	Lara Stesevic; Montenegro	Milica Nikolic (tied); Serbia	Alexandra Fotiadis; Greece	Alla Gribova; Russia	Not awarded	Jounieh, Lebanon	28
2022	Nikolina Baljak; Serbia	Maya De Los; Desamparados Litran Esteve; Spain	Mija Sterjovska; North Macedonia	Alevtina Bubnova; Switzerland	Paula Fernanda Assunçao; Portugal	Tamara Stasiulevych; Ukraine	Elena Esina; Russia	Ekaterina Kuzmina; Italy	Beirut, Lebanon	30
2023	Natalia Guglielmo; Italy	Margarita Golubeva; Russia	Anastasia Kubetz; Germany	Anna Bykova; Russia-2	Polina Volodei; Estonia	Olvia Shevchenko; Poland	Katerina Pasalari; Greece	Not awarded	Beirut, Lebanon	26
2024	Roza Gadieva; Russia	Elmas Yilmaz; Turkey	Irina Maksimovich; Belarus	Diana June; Germany	Milena Melnychuk; Ukraine	Virginia Furst; United Kingdom	Dima El Kilani; Sweden	Not awarded	Jounieh, Lebanon	22
2025	Yuliia Pavlikova; Russia	Myroslava Lisikhun; Ukraine	Simona Petrova; Bulgaria	Samanta Misovic; Greece	Rebeca Carabus; Romania	Juliana Gjorgjievska; Macedonia	Luisana Mendez; Spain	Romina Iavorschi; Moldova	Beirut, Lebanon	23
2026	Kseniia Gnedina; Russia	Maria Isaeva; Crimea	Alisa Miskovska; Latvia	Lia Berzan; Romania	Patricia Cernikova; Czech Republic	Monika Crnokrak; Macedonia	Diana Canalas; Italy	Not awarded	Beirut, Lebanon	24

- Official website

=== Winners by countries and territories ===
Countries	Year
RussiaTurkey	2024
Italy	2023
Serbia	2022 2021
France	2020
Ukraine	2019
United Kingdom	2018
Lithuania	2017
Greece	2016
Latvia	2015

== Miss, Mrs., Miss Teen Europe Global ==
The Miss Europe Global and Mrs. Europe Global is an annual pageant designed without any ethnicity requirements.

Year	Miss Europe Global	Mrs. Europe Global	Location	Entrants
2015-16	Lidia Ivanova; Spain	Unknown; Bulgaria	California	41
2017-18	Tatiana Pushkina; Russia	Zamira Craig; Kyrgyzstan-England	California	32
2019-20	Melissa Cecilia Cofield; Sweden	Zamira Craig; Kyrgyzstan-England	California	40
2021-22	Zaina Ali; Egypt	Charlie Lowe; Spain	California	37-50
2023	Michelle Beach; Armenia	Monica Spruch; Poland	California	37-50

=== Winners by countries and territories ===
Miss Europe Global

Country/Territory	Titles	Year(s)
Armenia	1	2023
Egypt	1	2021-22
Sweden	1	2019-20
Russia	1	2017-18
Spain	1	2015-16

Mrs. Europe Global

Country/Territory	Titles	Year(s)
Kyrgyzstan-England	2	2017-18, 2019–20
Poland	1	2023
Spain	1	2021-22
Bulgaria	1	2015-16

== Miss Europe (Austria-based) ==
This contest was licensed by the Miss Earth franchise.

Year	Miss Europe	1st Runner up	2nd Runner up	3rd Runner up	Location
2019	Nina Jovanović; Serbia	Unknown	Unknown	Unknown	Vienna, Austria
2020	Ljubica Rajkovic; Serbia	Ilona Vasko; Ukraine	Mikaella Nikolaou; Cyprus	Anja Bijelic; Croatia	Vienna, Austria
2021	Beatrice Körmer; Austria	Carla Jacob; France	Diana Mironenko; Ukraine	Sandra Guzek; Poland	Vösendorf, Austria

=== Winners by countries and territories ===
Country/Territory	Titles	Year(s)
Serbia	2	2019, 2020
Austria	1	2021

== Miss European Union ==
Year	Miss European Union	1st Runner up	2nd Runner up	Location	Entrants
2006	Miss European Union 2006				
2021	Maiko Lapachi; Georgia	Angela Vasilevska; North Macedonia	Unknown; Germany	Budapest, Hungary	21

=== Winners by countries and territories ===
Country/Territory	Titles	Year(s)
Georgia	1	2021
Unknown	1	2006

== Miss Europe Continental ==
Miss Europe Continental is an international beauty contest based on trends in fashion and cinema. The International Competition, with its network of agents, organizes selections every month throughout Europe.

Year	Miss European Union	1st Runner up	2nd Runner up	3rd Runner up	4th Runner up	Location	Entrants
2013	Serena Petralia; Italy	Unknown				Naples, Italy	Unknown
2014	Nicole Di Mario; Italy	Unknown				Naples, Italy	154
2015	Lindita Idrizi; Albania	Unknown				Naples, Italy	22
2016	Anna Semenkova; Russia	Unknown				Naples, Italy	30
2017	Natalia Varchenko; Ukraine	Unknown				Naples, Italy	37
2018	Araceli del Cont; Bosnia and Herzegovina	Unknown				Naples, Italy	48
2019	Sara Taheri; France	Unknown				Naples, Italy	46
2020-21	No pageant was held						
2022	Barbara Suter; Switzerland	Viktoria Karida; Greece	Monika Stronska; Poland	Cristini De Lima Coutto; Spain	Zuzana Licha; Slovakia	Naples, Italy	37
2024	Yulia Karpets; Ukraine	Yuliia Yuhrenson; Poland	Mariya Tsischanka; Belarus	Klarisa Cuka; Albania	Fausta Budreckyte; Lithuania	Naples, Italy	36

Year	Miss Europe Continental									
Year	World		International		Global		Planet		Multinational	
Year	Winners	1st Runner up	Winners	1st Runner up	Winners	1st Runner up	Winners	1st Runner up	Winners	1st Runner up
2022	Mina Jay; Iran	Palina Brailian; Bulgaria	Sofia Cajo; Peru	Adriana Rugeles; Colombia	Aigerim Abilkadirova; Kazakhstan	Joelle Berchini; Lebanon	Lisandra Franciskievicz; Brazil	Yuval Bochan; Israel	Betsy Buitrago; Colombia	Nora Arellano; Mexico

=== Winners by countries and territories ===
Country/Territory	Titles	Year(s)
Ukraine	2	2017, 2024
Italy	2	2013, 2014
Switzerland	1	2022
France	1	2019
Bosnia and Herzegovina	1	2018
Russia	1	2016
Albania	1	2015

== See also ==
- List of beauty contests
