= Miss Europe 1949 =

International beauty pageant

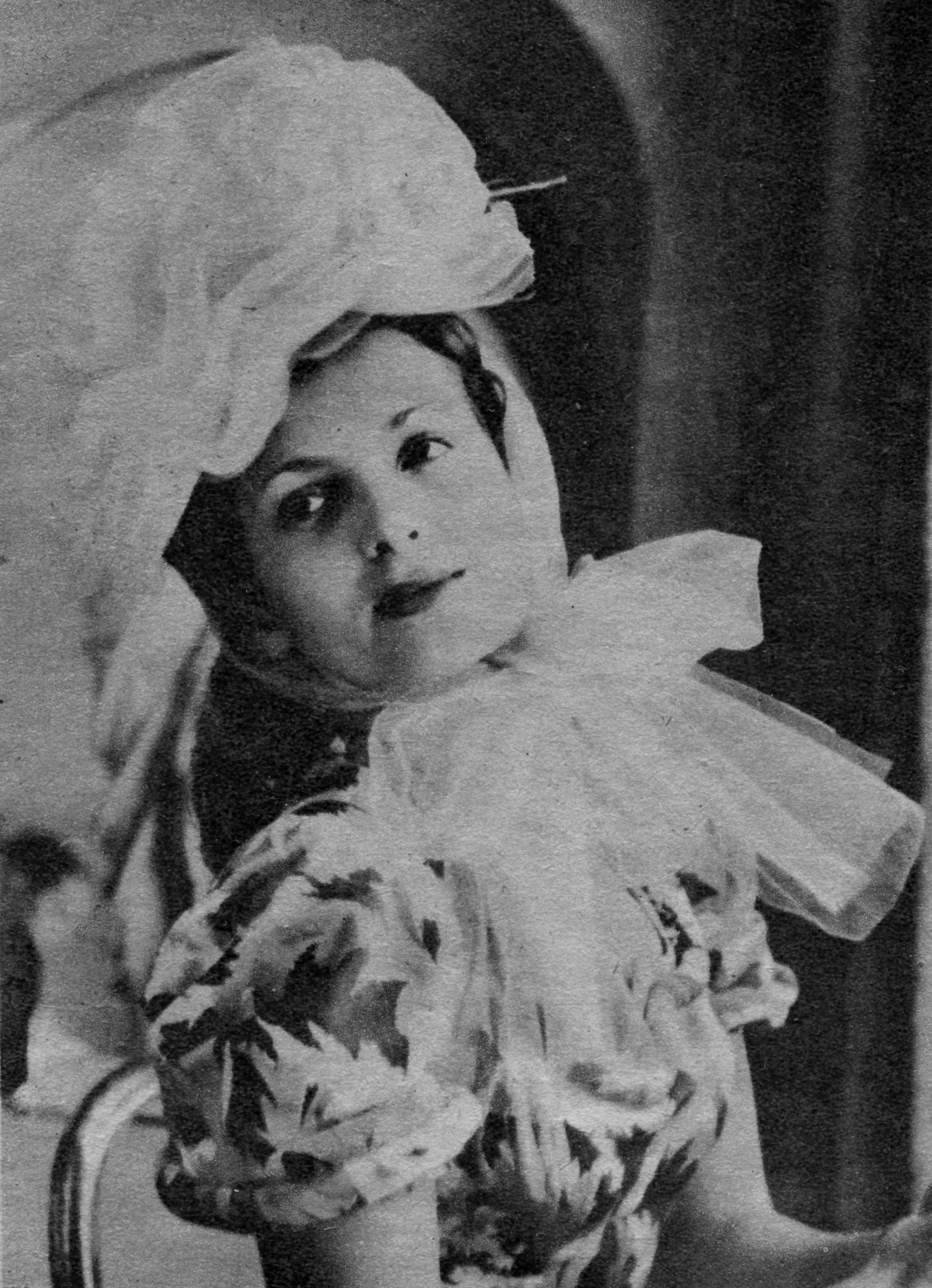
- Miss Europe 1949, Juliette Figueras of France
- Date: 17 September 1949
- Venue: Palermo, Sicily, Italy
- Entrants: 11
- Withdrawals: Czechoslovakia, Dominions (Great Britain), Germany, Yugoslavia
- Returns: Holland, Ireland & Sweden
- Winner: Juliette Figueras; France

Miss Europe 1949 was the 13th edition of the Miss Europe pageant and the second under the Mondial Events Organization. It was held in Palermo, Sicily, Italy on 17 September 1949. Juliette Figueras of France was crowned Miss Europe 1949 (sometimes called Miss Europe 1950).

== Results ==
=== Placements ===
Placement	Contestant
Miss Europe 1949	France – Juliette Figueras
1st Runner-Up	Switzerland – Noëlle Stern
2nd Runner-Up	Italy – Anna Maria Visconti
2nd Runner-Up	Denmark – Elinor Wedel Hansen

Score: 1. France: 40 points, 2. Switzerland: 17, 3. Italy and Denmark: 16, 4. Austria: 14, 5. England: 13.

== Contestants ==
- Austria – Maria Nadja Tiller
- Belgium – Andréa Bouillon
- Denmark – Elinor Wedel Hansen
- Finland – Terttu Nyman
- France – Juliette Figueras
- Great Britain – Elaine Pryce
- Holland – Mary Jochemsen
- Ireland – Margaret Lalor
- Italy – Anna Maria Visconti
- Sweden – Kerstin Ringberg
- Switzerland – Noëlle Stern

== Notes ==
=== Withdrawals ===
- Czechoslovakia
- (United Kingdom) Dominions (Great Britain) – June Mitchell (could not compete because Miss Great Britain was also in the pageant)
- Germany – Irmgard Stroessinger
- Yugoslavia
