= Miss Europe 1933 =

International beauty pageant

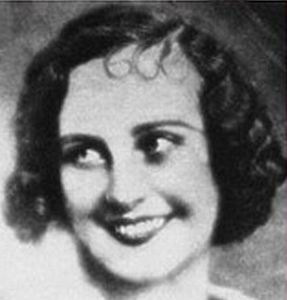
- Date: May 27, 1933
- Venue: Madrid, Spain
- Entrants: 14
- Debuts: Norway, Scotland
- Withdrawals: Argentina, Czechoslovakia, Paris' South American Colony
- Winner: Tat’yana Maslova; Soviet Union (In exile)

Miss Europe 1933 was the sixth annual Miss Europe and the fifth edition under French journalist Maurice de Waleffe. New Delegates from Norway and Scotland were competing in Miss Europe. Withdraws were Miss Argentina and Miss Paris' South American Colony.

Charlotte Hartmann, who had been crowned Miss Germany before the Nazi seizure of power, was not allowed to attend by the new government but competed after the Miss Europe pageant allowed her to compete in secret.

== Results ==
=== Placements ===
Placement	Contestant
Miss Europe 1933	Soviet Union – Tat’yana Maslova
1st Runner-Up	Hungary – Júlia Gál

== Delegates ==
- Belgium – Simone Eraerts
- Denmark – Karen Marie Lowert
- England – Angela Ward
- France – Jacqueline Bertin
- Germany – Charlotte Hartmann
- Hungary – Júlia Gál
- Italy – Ivana Fusco
- Norway – Gudrun Hilditch Rygh
- Romania – Dina Mihalcea
- Scotland – Avia Talbot
- Soviet Union (in exile) – Tat’yana Maslova
- Spain – Emilia Docet
- Turkey – Nazire Hanem
- Yugoslavia – Dragica Ugarkovitch
