= Nazlı Deniz Kuruoğlu =

Nazlı Deniz Kuruoğlu (born c. 1960) is a Turkish ballet dancer and a former beauty contestant and Miss Europe 1982.

She was educated in ballet dancing at the Conservatory of Mimar Sinan University in Istanbul, Turkey. She danced in the state opera until she had to quit active dancing career following a meniscus operation. Currently, she is lecturing movement science in the same university. Nazlı Deniz is also partner of a cosmetics company. She enjoys painting and outdoor sports like horseback riding and motocross.

After winning the title Miss Turkey 1981, Nazlı represented her country at the Miss Europe beauty contest held in İstanbul, and was crowned Miss Europe on June 12, 1982. She became so the third Turkish beauty queen following Günseli Başar and Filiz Vural.

Awards
Preceded by (Denmark) Anne Mette Larsen	Miss Europe; 1982	Succeeded by (Turkey) Neşe Erberk
