= Miss Europe 1963 =

International beauty pageant

- Date: 7 June 1963
- Venue: Casino du Liban, Beirut, Lebanon
- Entrants: 18
- Placements: 5
- Returns: Portugal
- Winner: Mette Stenstad; Norway

Miss Europe 1963 was the 26th edition of the Miss Europe pageant and the 15th edition under the Mondial Events Organization. It was held at the Casino du Liban in Beirut, Lebanon on 7 June 1963. Mette Stenstad of Norway was crowned Miss Europe 1963 by outgoing titleholder Maruja García Nicoláu of Spain.

== Results ==
=== Placements ===
| Final results | Contestant |
|---|---|
| Miss Europe 1963 | Norway – Mette Stenstad |
| 1st runner-up | Switzerland – Diane Tanner |
| 2nd runner-up | Denmark – Aino Korwa (Korva) |
| 3rd runner-up | Sweden – Grete Qviberg |
| 4th runner-up | Finland – Marja-Liisa Ståhlberg |

== Contestants ==
- Austria – Rosemarie Winkler
- Belgium – Irène Godin
- Denmark – Aino Korwa (Korva)
- England – Susan Pratt
- Finland – Marja-Liisa Ståhlberg
- France – Sabine Surget
- Germany – Gisela Karschuck
- Greece – Aleka Aktseli
- Holland – Juno Onink
- Iceland – Liney Friðfinnsdóttir
- Italy – Gianna Erbetta (real name: Gianna Serra)
- Luxembourg – Sylvie Welter
- Norway – Mette Stenstad
- Portugal – Maria José Santos Trindade Defolloy
- Spain – María del Carmen Abreu Martínez
- Sweden – Grete Qviberg
- Switzerland – Diane Tanner
- Turkey – Sevim Emre

== Notes ==
=== Returns ===
- Portugal
