= Miss Europe 1967 =

International beauty pageant

- Date: 3 June 1967
- Venue: Nice, France
- Entrants: 20
- Placements: 6
- Debuts: Malta
- Returns: Yugoslavia
- Winner: Paquita Torres Pérez; Spain

Miss Europe 1967 was the 30th edition of the Miss Europe pageant and the 19th edition under the Mondial Events Organization. It was held in Nice, France on 3 June 1967. Paquita Torres Pérez of Spain was crowned Miss Europe 1967 by outgoing titleholder Maria Dornier of France.

== Results ==
=== Placements ===
Placement	Contestant
Miss Europe 1967	Spain – Paquita Torres
1st Runner-Up	Netherlands – Irene van Campenhout
2nd Runner-Up	Italy – Daniela Giordano†
3rd Runner-Up	Sweden – Annika Hemminge
4th Runner-Up	Turkey – Yelda Gürani Saner
5th Runner-Up	Greece – Toula Galani
6th Runner-Up	Finland – Ritva Lehto†

== Contestants ==
- Austria – Brigitte Hejda
- Belgium – Mauricette Sironval
- Denmark – Margrethe "Gitte" Rhein-Knudsen
- England – Jennifer Lynn Lewis
- Finland – Ritva Helena Lehto†
- France – Anne Vernier
- Germany – Brigitte Boy
- Greece – Toula Galani
- Holland – Irene van Campenhout
- Iceland – Guðrún Pétursdóttir
- Ireland – Gemma McNabb
- Italy – Daniela Giordano†
- Luxembourg – Marie-Josée Mathgen
- Malta – Patricia Best
- Norway – Gro Goksør
- Spain – Paquita Torres Pérez
- Sweden – Annika Hemminge
- Switzerland – Anita Niderost
- Turkey – Yelda Gürani Saner
- Yugoslavia – Slavenka Veselinović

== Notes ==
=== Debuts ===
- Malta

=== Returns ===
- Yugoslavia
