= Miss Grand South Africa 2024 =

9th Miss Grand South Africa competition, beauty pageant edition

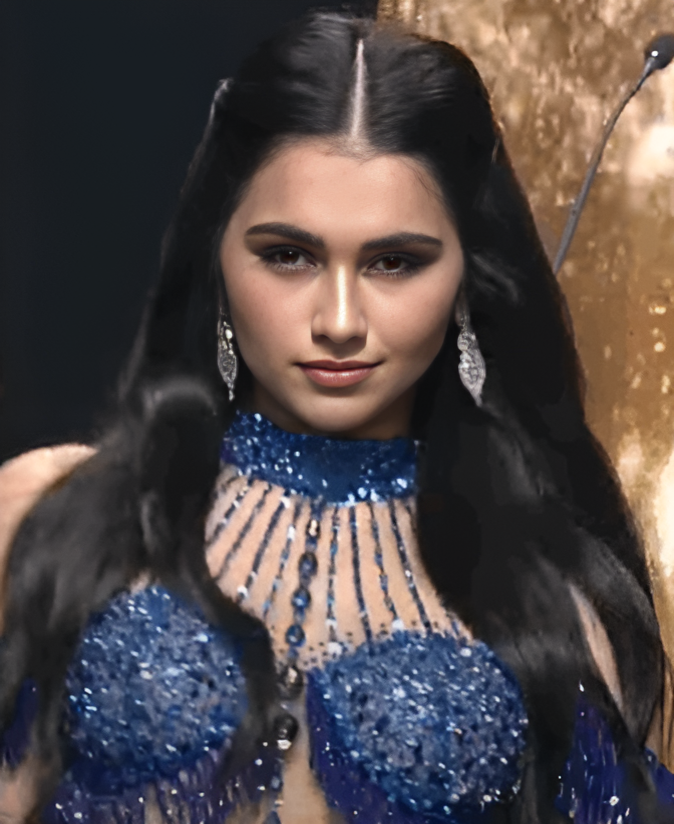
- Sharné Dheochand, the winner of the contest
- Date: June 1, 2024
- Presenters: Lenie Pieterse
- Venue: Theatre of Marcellus, Emperors Palace, Johannesburg
- Entrants: 28
- Placements: 11
- Winner: Sharné Dheochand (Newcastle)
- Photogenic: Chanel Rautenbach (Vanderbijlpark)

Miss Grand South Africa 2024 was the ninth edition of the Miss Grand South Africa pageant, held on June 1, 2024, at the Theatre of Marcellus, Emperors Palace, Johannesburg. Twenty-eight candidates from different districts of the country competed for the title. Of whom, a model from Newcastle, Sharné Dheochand, was announced the winner and will represent the country at the international parent stage, Miss Grand International 2024.

== Pageant ==
Before entering the final stage, all qualified finalists attended several pageant-related workshops starting on 16 March in Centurion. The pageant's grand final round was expected to happen in mid-2024. In this edition, the winner of the Public Choice Award, determined via bank transfer-paid voting, will receive an extra 3 points in the grand final round as well as automatically qualify for the top 11 finalists regardless of the accumulated scores.

== Result ==
Position	Delegate
Miss Grand South Africa 2024	Newcastle – Sharné Dheochand
1st runner-up	Lyttelton – Karabo Lawal
2nd runner-up	Vanderbijlpark – Suhané Bosch
3rd runner-up	Carlswald – Sinamile Dlamini
4th runner-up	Springs – Lesego Nyathela
Top 11	Mahikeng – Kgakollo Dithipe; Mountain View – Odwa Nyeke; Vanderbijlpark – Chanel Rautenbach; No data available; No data available; No data available
Special awards
Public Choice	Mountain View – Odwa Nyeke (Note: Automatically qualify for the top 11 finalists regardless of the accumulated scores.)
Miss Photogenic	Vanderbijlpark – Chanel Rautenbach

== Candidates ==
Twenty-eight candidates competed for the title, none from the provinces of the Free State and the Northern Cape.

Team Eastern Cape	Team KwaZulu-Natal	Team Gauteng
East London – Chumasande Somazembe; Gqeberha – Allison Vogelstruis	Ladysmith – Nokwanda Bila; Musgrave – Sivuyile Malinga; Newcastle – Sharné Dheochand; Umlazi – Alicia Mthembu (withdrew)	Alberton – Thenjiwe Khatle; Bedworthpark – Mandisa Khumalo; Boksburg – Melissa Moyani; Boksburg – Nandipha Nqati; Carlswald – Sinamile Dlamini; Hazelwood – Kefiloe Kolopang; Johannesburg – Juane Bekker; Linden – Naledi Mphahlele; Lyttelton – Karabo Lawal; Mountain View – Odwa Nyeke; Soweto – Fhulufhelo Bilankulu (withdrew); Soweto – Lethaukuthula Maseko (withdrew); Springs – Lesego Nyathela; Vanderbijlpark – Chanel Rautenbach; Vanderbijlpark – Suhané Bosch; Vereeniging – Dikeledi Mokwane; Vereeniging – Sherlain Holmes
Team Limpopo	Team Mpumalanga
Phalaborwa – Zinhle Mkhabela; Polokwane – Pertunia Mathole	Leandra – Portia Ndaba
Team North West	Team Western Cape
Brits – Relebogile Muruvi (withdrew); Ganyesa – Letlhogonolo Basime; Mahikeng – Kgakollo Dithipe; Rustenburg – Galaletsang Phuti	Cape Town – Candy-lee Duarttee; Stellenbosch – Colleen Stafford
