= Miss Grand South Africa 2023 =

8th Miss Grand South Africa competition, beauty pageant edition

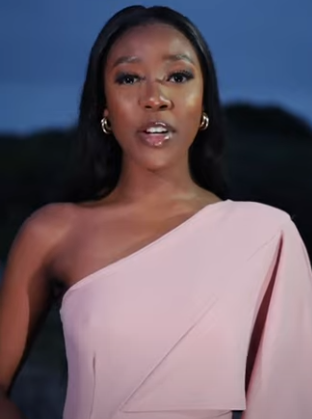
- Gugulethu Mayisela, the winner of the contest
- Date: 22 July 2023
- Presenters: Tumelo Matela; Ruan Scheepers
- Venue: Atterbury Theatre, Pretoria
- Entrants: 25
- Placements: 11
- Winner: Gugulethu Mayisela (Gauteng)
- Best in Swimsuit: Jaqueline Cronje (Gauteng)

Miss Grand South Africa 2023 was the eighth edition of the Miss Grand South Africa beauty pageant, held on July 22, 2023, at the Atterbury Theatre in South Africa's capital, Pretoria. Twenty-five candidates who qualified for the national pageant through the virtual casting competed for the title, and a 19-year-old former Miss Teen World from Johannesburg, Gugulethu Mayisela, was elected the winner. She was crowned by Miss Grand South Africa 2022, Lu Juan Mzyk, and obtain the right to represent the country at the Miss Grand International 2023 pageant, which is scheduled to be in Vietnam on October 25.

== Result ==
Position	Delegate
Miss Grand South Africa 2023	Gauteng – Gugulethu Mayisela
1st runner-up	Eastern Cape – Thulani Ndzotyana
2nd runner-up	Western Cape – Joey Roman
3rd runner-up	KwaZulu-Natal – Robyn Hill
4th runner-up	North West – Monique Best
Top 11	Eastern Cape – Philene van Niekerk; Gauteng – Annedernive Brown; Gauteng – Jané van Niekerk; Gauteng – Jaqueline Cronje; Gauteng – Rhulani Mathevula; Limpopo – Mologadi Monoge

== Candidates ==
Initially, thirty-four candidates were confirmed to participate, but nine of them withdrew, making the finalized total of twenty-five candidates.

Team Eastern Cape	Team KwaZulu-Natal	Team North West	Team Gauteng
Nandi Sonjica; Philene van Niekerk; Snenhlanhla Gumede; Thulani Ndzotyana	Luleka Ntanzi; Mvelenhle Dlungwane; Robyn Hill; Tara-Linn Govender	Monique Best; Palesa Masuku	Annedernive Brown; Gugulethu Mayisela; Jané van Niekerk; Jaqueline Cronje; Karabo Pororo; Malebogo Selaledi; Mikhaela Vythilingam; Nikiwe Msache; Rhulani Mathevula
Team Western Cape	Team Limpopo		Annedernive Brown; Gugulethu Mayisela; Jané van Niekerk; Jaqueline Cronje; Karabo Pororo; Malebogo Selaledi; Mikhaela Vythilingam; Nikiwe Msache; Rhulani Mathevula
Edwina Hess; Joey Roman; Siphosethu Vukemntwini	Diana Ndavani; Mologadi Monoge; Praise Nkovani		Annedernive Brown; Gugulethu Mayisela; Jané van Niekerk; Jaqueline Cronje; Karabo Pororo; Malebogo Selaledi; Mikhaela Vythilingam; Nikiwe Msache; Rhulani Mathevula
