= Star Hellas =

Beauty pageant

Star Hellas, Miss Hellas, Miss Young Σταρ Ελλάς, Μις Ελλάς, Μις Γιάνγκ
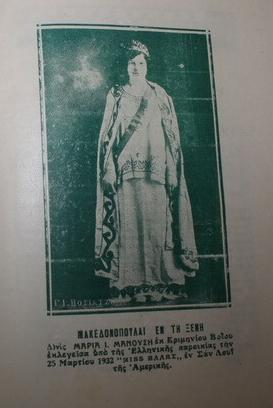
- Formation: 1929; 97 years ago
- Type: Beauty pageant
- Headquarters: Athens
- Location: Greece
- Members: Miss World; Miss International; Miss Supranational; Miss Cosmo; Miss Global
- Official language: Greek
- National Director: Vassilis Prevelakis

Star Hellas (Greek: Σταρ Ελλάς, Μις Ελλάς, Μις Γιάνγκ) is a national beauty pageant in Greece.

The Star Hellas, Miss Hellas, Miss Young title is a trademark for Vassilis Prevelakis and Associates E.E.

George Prevelakis, the founder of the company, was the driving force behind the Hellenic Beauty Pageant since the late 1960s. From then onwards, he was closely associated with the pageant till his death in 2006. In the early 1980s the then owner of the pageant, the Apogevmatini newspaper, decided to pull out of the pageant and transferred the rights to George Prevelakis. George Prevelakis later founded a company (Vassilis Prevelakis and Associates E.E.), together with his son, Vassilis, and transferred the rights to the pageant to the new company. Vassilis Prevelakis and Associates E.E. has been the legal owner of the pageant and is the national director of the well known international pageants such as Miss World, Miss Universe.

In 2018 the I AM ONE Agency Network as the organiser of the Star Hellas and Miss Hellas 2018 competition, provides titleholders with international access to Miss Universe and Miss World competitions.

== Airing ==
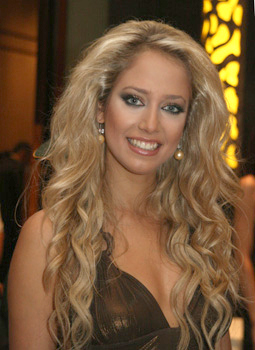
Katerina Evaggelinou, Miss Hellas 2007

In the 1970s and early 1980s the pageant was aired every year from the Ellinikí Radiofonía Tileórasi. From 1990 to 2010, it was funded and aired on Greece's private network ANT1.

Because of the Greek financial crisis, ΑΝΤ1 did not fund the 2011 pageant which had the form of a low-key private casting and was not aired. In 2012 the Star Hellas organizers staged a comeback by teaming with Internet site TLife which became responsible for the publicity of the event and for airing live over the Internet.

== International winners ==
- Miss Universe:
  - 1964 - Corinna Tsopei
- Miss World:
  - 1996 - Irene Skliva
- Miss International:
  - 1994 - Christina Lekka
- Miss Tourism Queen International:
  - 2005 - Nikoletta Ralli
- Miss Europe:
  - 1930 - Aliki Diplarakou
  - 1991 - Katerina Michalopoulou
  - 1992 - Marina Tsintikidou
  - 1997 - Isavella Dara
- Miss Teen World:
  - 2010 - Anastasia Sidiropoulou
- Miss Europe World:
  - 2016 - Mikaela Fotiadis
- Miss Tourism International:
  - 1995 - Maria Patelli

== Titleholders ==
Winning International Title
Miss Universe Greece
Miss World Greece
Miss International Greece
Miss Supranational Greece
Miss Earth Greece
Miss Grand Greece
Miss Cosmo Greece
Miss Intercontinental Greece
Miss Europe Greece
Miss Tourism Greece
Miss Young International Greece
Other pageants: International Beauty Queen, Miss Nations, Miss Mediterranean, Maja International, Miss European Economic Community, Reina del Turismo Mundial, etc.

Year	Star Hellas	Miss Hellas	Miss Young	B Star Hellas	B Miss Hellas	Miss Greek	Miss Greek Beauty
1929	Aspasia Karatza	Dina Sarri	Debuted 1971	Debuted 1953	Debuted 1953	Debuted 1956	Debuted 1960
1930	Aliki Diplarakou; Miss Europe 1930	Roxani Stergiou	Debuted 1971	Debuted 1953	Debuted 1953	Debuted 1956	Debuted 1960
1931	Chrissoula Rodi	x	Debuted 1971	Debuted 1953	Debuted 1953	Debuted 1956	Debuted 1960
1952	Daisy Mavraki	Virginia Petimezaki	Debuted 1971	Debuted 1953	Debuted 1953	Debuted 1956	Debuted 1960
1953	Doreta Xirou	Antoanetta Rodopoulou	Debuted 1971	Ermina Damascu	Alexandra Ladikou	Debuted 1956	Debuted 1960
1954	Rika Diallina	Efi Mela	Debuted 1971	Efi Androulakaki	Julia Stamiri	Debuted 1956	Debuted 1960
1955	Sonia Zoidou	Julia Koumoundourou	Debuted 1971	x	Rona Karakasi	Debuted 1956	Debuted 1960
1956	Rita Gouma	Maria Pasalogou	Debuted 1971	x	Marina Dimitropoulou; Disqualified	Debuted 1956	Debuted 1960
1957	Lygia Karavia	Nana Gasparatou	Debuted 1971	x	May Kavalik; Did not compete	Dora Kostidou	Debuted 1960
1958	Marily Kalimopoulou	Mary Panoutsopoulou	Debuted 1971	x	Eleonora Apergi	Ninetta Lekka	Debuted 1960
1959	Zoitsa Kouroukli	Yakinthi Karaditi	Debuted 1971	x	Tzeni Loukea	Pari Leventi; International Beauty Queen 1959	Debuted 1960
1960	Magda Pasaloglou	Calliope Garalex	Debuted 1971	x	Maria Tsavdari; Did not compete	Nafsika Papagiannidou	Vasiliki Kotsaridou
1961	Ria Deloutsi	Efi Karaiskaki	Debuted 1971	x	Katie Papadaki	Ioanna Takats	Ioanna Berouka
1962	Christina Apostolou	Jasmine Moraitou	Debuted 1971	x	Aleka Aksetli	Ioanna Kranidou	Ioanna Delakou
1963	Despina Orgeta	Soula Idromenou	Debuted 1971	x	Kia Lymberi	Mary Kapsalaki	Emi Zanou
1964	Corinna Tsopei; Miss Universe 1964	Mary Kougioumtzaki	Debuted 1971	x	Evgenia Xagorari	Voula Stefatou	Maria Schinaraki
1965	Aspa Theologitou	Maria Gkaka	Debuted 1971	x	Stevi Vikartzi	Annita Daleziou	Vivi Niavi
1966	Katia Balafouta	Efi Ploubi	Debuted 1971	x	Toula Galani	Despina Kourtzi	Nagia Galakouti
1967	Elya Kalogeraki	Harris Papanikita	Debuted 1971	x	Mimika Niave	Johana Hamaraki	Fani Sakantani
1968	Miranta Zafiropoulou	Lia Malta	Debuted 1971	x	Antzela Radisi	Irini Lorandou	x
1969	Elena Alexopoulou	Irene Diamantoglou	Debuted 1971	x	Evi Spanou	Kiki Bourlesi	x
1970	Vivi Alexopoulou	Yuli Vardi	Debuted 1971	x	Christina Chatzopoulou	Niki Kouliouka	x
1971	Gogo Atzoletaki	Gery Karagianni	Irini Raikou	x	Maria Maltezou	Georgia Gerogianni	x
1972	Nancy Kapetanaki	Eleni Lykissa	Nteniz Voulgari	x	Mary Drakopoulou	Neti Fasouli	x
1973	Vana Papadaki; Maja International 1974	Katerina Bakali	Lena Kleopa	x	Ninetta Sarri	Mariella Digiakomou	x
1975	Afroditi Katsouli	Bella Adamopoulou	Mary Alifieri	x	Maria Tzobanaki	x	x
1976	Christiana Kavroudaki; Did not compete	Melina Michailidi	Eri Vakalopoulou	x	Rania Theofilus	x	x
1977	Maria Spantidaki	Lina Ioannou	Tina Sountri	x	Lia Agha	x	x
1978	Marietta Kountouraki	Ariana Dimitropoulou	Kaiti Adamopoulou	x	Aspasia Krokidou	x	x
1979	Katia Koukidou	Mika Dimitropoulou	Athina Pomakidou; Did not compete	x	Despina Triantafyllou	x	x
1980	Roula Kanellopoulou	Vera Zacharopoulou	Maria Karafanti	x	Katerina Manaraki	x	x
1981	Maria Nikouli	Maria Argyrokastritou	Maria Armadorou	x	Filomeni Diamantopoulou	Natassa Xanthopoulou	x
1982	Tina Roussou	Anthi Privolou	Maria Marineli	x	Nantina Synnefia	Iro Hatziioannou	x
1983	Plousia Farfaraki	Anna Martinou	Eleana Pagoura	x	x	Dimitra Kouki	x
1984	Peggy Dogani	Vana Barba	Zoi Elmalioti; Miss Mediterranean Sea 1985	x	x	x	x
1985	Sabina Damianidou	Epil Galanou	Efthimia "Efi" Dereka	x	x	x	x
1986	Vasilia Mantaki	Anna Kehagia	Afrodite Panagiotou	x	x	x	x
1987	Xenia Pantazi	Elena Moschou	Georgia Alexandri	x	x	x	x
1988	Tereza Liakou; Did not compete	Ariadne Mylona	Taria Boura	x	x	x	x
1989	Christiana Latani	Katerina Petropoulou	Stella Tzekou	x	x	x	x
1990	Jenny Balatsinou	Sofia Lavikioti	Afroditi Kouli	x	x	x	x
1991	Marina Poupou	Myriam Panagou	Dimitra Papadogianni	x	x	Katerina Michalopoulou; Miss Europe 1991	x
1992	Marina Tsintikidou; Miss Europe 1992	Evgenia Paschalidi	Helena Liafou	x	x	Sofia Alexandropoulou	x
1993	Christina Manousi	Mania Delou	Melina Zaharaki	Afrodite Kouli	Helena Zabaka	Antzela Markaki	x
1994	Rea Toutounzi	Evi Adam	Johanna Papadimitriou	x	Giolanta Diamanti	Christina Lekka; Miss International 1994	x
1995	Eleni Papaioannou	Mary Boziki	Chrisa Kontogiorgou	Maria Pavli	Johanna Mavredaki	Viki Likotrafiti	x
1996	Nina Georgala	Irene Scliva; Miss World 1996	Aggelina Mavridou	Noni Dounia	Anna Repa	Rania Lykoudi	x
1997	Elina Zisi	Evgenia Limantzaki	Ioanna Kafkopoulou	Vanessa Stavrou	Katia Sgouropoulou	Isavella Dara; Miss Europe 1997	Romina Livadarou
1998	Dimitra Eginiti	Katia Margaritoglou	Viki Bartzioka	Antzela Evripidi	Heleni Pliatsika	x	x
1999	Sofia Rapti	Evi Vatidou	Dimitra Kitsaki	Fei Georgakopoulou	Penelope Lentzou	x	x
2000	Nancy Tzoulaki	Eleni Skafida	Stella Giaboura	Alexandra Ousta	Dimitra Kitsiou	x	x
2001	Evelina Papantoniou	Valentini Daskaloudi	Mary Vergeti	Fotini Kokari	Eleftheria Pantelidaki	x	x
2002	Lena Paparigopoulou	Katerina Georgiadou	Tzoulia Alexandratou	Stella Giaboura	Georgia Miha	x	x
2003	Marietta Chrousala	Vassiliki Tsekoura	Kim Mantzouratou	Apostolina "Lina" Zaproudi	Katerina Kariotou; Did not compete	x	x
2004	Valia Kakouti	Maria Spyridaki	Violeta Raseva	Olga Kipriotou	Axia Andreadaki; Did not compete	x	x
2005	Evagelia Aravani	Katerina Stikoudi	Katerina Evangelinou; Miss Young International 2005	Potoula Perimeni	Nikoleta Ralli; Miss Tourism Queen International 2005	x	x
2006	Olympia Chopsonidou	Irene Carra	Tzoulia Alexandratou; Did not compete	Nasia Anerousi	Helena Asimakopoulou; Did not compete	x	Helena Karpodini
2007	Doukissa Nomikou	Katerina Evangelinou	Ntaiana Igropoulou; Miss Young International 2007	Antonia Kallimoukou	Despina Vlepaki	x	x
2008	Dionysia Koukiou	Angeliki Kalaitzi	Evgenia Karahaliou; Did not compete	Ria Antoniou	Sofia Roditi	Niki Peristeri	x
2009	Viviana Kampanile	Alkistis Anyfanti	Katerina Skourli	Daiana Igropoulou	Margarita Papandreou	x	x
2010	Anna Prelevic	Mado Gasteatou	Melina Syrii	Maria Tsagaraki	Eleonora Mpretz	x	x
2011	Iliana Papageorgiou	Eleni Miariti	x	x	x	x	x
2012	Vasiliki Tsirogianni	Athina Pikraki	Eleni Kokkinou	Eftichia Lazarou	Christina Georgopoulou	x	Antigone Ambadas
2013	Anastasia Sidiropoulou	x	x	x	x	x	x
2014	Ismini Dafopoulou	Eleni Kokkinou	x	x	x	x	x
2015	Mikaela Fotiadis; Miss Europe World 2016	Katerina Galiatsatou; Did not compete	x	Rafaela Rodinou	Spyridoula Valasiadou	x	Kalliopi Galetsa
2017	Maria Psilou	Theodora Soukia	Emmanuela Bayraktari	Chrysa Androutsopoulou	Areti Yannia	x	x
2018	Ioanna Bella	Maria Lepida	Anastasia Kalogeri	Angeliki Mavrommati	Marina Grigoriou	x	x
2019	Rafaela Plastira	Erika Kolani; Did not compete	x	Ioanna Handzi	Natalia Papaefthymiou	Sara Chechou	x
2021	Anna Pavlidou	Pasalari Katerina; Did not compete	Zunja Angeliki	Rutoula Anna	Krepouri Matina	x	x
2022	Samantha Misovic	Zoe Asoumanaki	Ioanna Skoula	Anatoli Hexadactylo	Konstantina Sotiriou	x	x
2024	Stella Michaelidou	Daniela Palousi	Zygopoulou Konstantina	Ioanna Sarantopoulou	Maria Gerolimatou; Did not compete	x	x
2025	Mikaela Kasari	Maria Katerina Apostolaki	Konstantina-Ermina Soukou	Ziwei Dimitra Varaki	Anna Nikolara	x	x
