= Miss Europe 1991 =

International beauty pageant

- Date: 29 June 1991
- Venue: Dakar, Senegal
- Entrants: 27
- Placements: 12
- Debuts: Lithuania
- Withdrawals: Gibraltar; Israel; Malta; Yugoslavia
- Returns: Bulgaria; Czechoslovakia; Estonia; Hungary; Lithuania; Luxembourg; Romania; Switzerland
- Winner: Susanne Petry; Germany (Dethroned); Katerina Michalopoulou; Greece (Succeeded)

Miss Europe 1991 was the 46th edition of the Miss Europe pageant and the 35th edition under the Mondial Events Organization. It was held in Dakar, Senegal on 29 June 1991. Susanne Petry of Germany was originally crowned Miss Europe 1991, but was later "dismissed" and dethroned. The crown then went to Katerina Michalopoulou of Greece. They both succeeded outgoing titleholder Michela Rocco di Torrepadula of Italy.

== Results ==
=== Placements ===
Placement	Contestant
Miss Europe 1991	Germany – Susanne Petry (Dethroned)
1st Runner-Up	Greece – Katerina Michalopoulou (Assumed)
2nd Runner-Up	Spain – Silvia Jato
3rd Runner-Up	Turkey – Defne Samyeli
4th Runner-Up	Czechoslovakia – Unknown
Top 12	Estonia – Liis Tappo; Finland – Tanja Vienonen; Hungary – Antónia Bálint; Italy – Eleonora Benfatto; Poland – Ewa Maria Szymczak; Portugal – Carla Lopes da Costa Caldeira; Sweden – Marlene Quick

== Contestants ==
- Austria – Sandra Luttenberger
- Belgium – Katia Alens
- Bulgaria – UNKNOWN
- Czechoslovakia – UNKNOWN
- Denmark – UNKNOWN
- England – Racquel Jory
- Estonia – Liis Tappo
- Finland – Tanja Vienonen
- France – Gaëlle Voiry (Gaille Voiry)
- Germany – Susanne Petry
- Greece – Katerina Michalopoulou
- Holland – Monique Flinkevleugel
- Hungary – Antónia Bálint (Bálint Antónia)
- Iceland – Sigrún Eva Kristinsdóttir
- Italy – Eleonora Benfatto
- Lithuania – Greta Bardavelytė (Greta Bardavelite)
- Luxembourg – UNKNOWN
- Norway – Tina Loddengaard
- Poland – Ewa Maria Szymczak
- Portugal – Carla Lopes da Costa Caldeira
- Romania – UNKNOWN
- Scotland – Karina Ferguson
- Spain – Silvia Jato
- Sweden – Marlene Quick
- Switzerland – Catherine Mesot
- Turkey – Defne Samyeli
- Wales – Jane Lloyd

== Notes ==
=== Withdrawals ===
- Gibraltar
- Israel
- Malta
- Yugoslavia

=== Debuts/Returns ===
- Lithuania – Was represented in the pageant as the Baltic States back in 1927. This is the first time Lithuania is competing as its own country.

=== Returns ===
- Bulgaria
- Czechoslovakia
- Estonia
- Hungary
- Luxembourg
- Romania
- Switzerland
