= Miss Europe 1992 =

International beauty pageant

- Date: June 15, 1992
- Venue: Athens, Greece
- Entrants: 32
- Placements: 12
- Debuts: Albania; Russia
- Withdrawals: Denmark
- Returns: Cyprus; Ireland; Israel; Malta; Russia
- Winner: Marina Tsintikidou; Greece

Miss Europe 1992 was the 47th edition of the Miss Europe pageant and the 36th edition under the Mondial Events Organization. It was held in Athens, Greece on June 15, 1992. Marina Tsintikidou of Greece was crowned Miss Europe 1992 by outgoing titleholder Katerina Michalopoulou of Greece.

== Results ==
=== Placements ===
Placement	Contestant
Miss Europe 1992	Greece – Marina Tsintikidou
1st Runner-Up	Czechoslovakia – Pavlína Babůrková
2nd Runner-Up	Turkey – Banu Sağnak
3rd Runner-Up	Finland – Kirsi-Mari Ketola
4th Runner-Up	Israel – Ravit Kanfi
Top 12	Albania – Valbona Selimllari; France – Linda Hardy; Germany – Meike Schwarz (Maike Schwartz); Italy – Rosangela Bessi; Portugal – Maria Fernanda Silva; Russia – Anna Portnaya; Spain – Sofia Mazagatos

== Contestants ==
- Albania – Valbona Selimllari
- Austria – Karin Friedl
- Belgium – Sandra Joine
- Bulgaria – Glina Velitchkova
- Cyprus – Yiota Koufalidou (Giota Koufalidou)
- Czechoslovakia – Pavlína Babůrková
- England – Joanne Elizabeth Lewis
- Estonia – Ekha Urbsalu
- Finland – Kirsi-Mari Ketola (Kirsi-Maria Ketola)
- France – Linda Hardy
- Germany – Meike Schwarz (Maike Schwartz)
- Greece – Marina Tsintikidou
- Holland – Mariëlle Pontier
- Hungary – Orsolya Anna Michna (Michna Orsolya)
- Iceland – Heiðrún Anna Björnsdóttir
- Ireland – Tara McDonald
- Israel – Ravit Kanfi
- Italy – Rosangela Bessi
- Lithuania – Rasa Kukenytė
- Luxembourg – Carole Reding
- Malta – Karin Demicoli
- Norway – Rita Omvik
- Poland – Jana Fabian
- Portugal – Maria Fernanda Silva
- Romania – Liliana Les
- Russia – Anna Portnaya
- Scotland – Katrina Lyall
- Spain – Sofia Mazagatos
- Sweden – Jeannette Lindstroem (Jeannette Lindström)
- Switzerland – Sandra Aegerter
- Turkey – Banu Sağnak
- Wales – Sharon Isherwood

== Notes ==
=== Withdrawals ===
- Denmark

=== Debuts ===
- Albania

=== Debuts/Returns ===
- Russia – Was represented in the pageant as Russia/USSR back in 1929 and the 1930s. This is the first time Russia is competing as its own country.

=== Returns ===
- Cyprus
- Ireland
- Israel
- Malta

== "Comité Officiel et International Miss Europe" Competition ==
Miss Europa 1992
- Date: September 27, 1992
- Venue: Catania, Sicily, Italy
- Broadcaster: Bellini Broadcasting Service
- Entrants: 12+
- Placements: 3
- Withdrawals: Austria, Cyprus, Finland, Hungary, Iceland, Liechtenstein, Malta, Norway, Scotland, Sweden, Switzerland, Wales & Yugoslavia
- Returns: Luxembourg
- Winner: Yolanda Marcos Gonzales; Spain

From 1951 to 2002 there was a rival Miss Europe competition organized by the "Comité Officiel et International Miss Europe". This was founded in 1950 by Jean Raibaut in Paris, the headquarters later moved to Marseille. The winners wore different titles like Miss Europe, Miss Europa or Miss Europe International.

On September 27, 1992, an unofficial Miss Europe competition took place in Catania, Sicily, Italy. There were at least 12 entrants in the pageant. At the end, Yolanda Marcos Gonzales of Spain was crowned as Miss Europa 1992. succeeded predecessor Sandrina Rossi of France.

=== Placements ===
Final results	Contestant
Miss Europa 1992	Spain – Yolanda Marcos Gonzales
1st runner-up	France – Anne Jandera
2nd runner-up	Greece – Elena Liafou (tied)
2nd runner-up	Italy – Tatiana Zaghet (tied)

=== Contestants ===
- Belgium – Nathalie De Cuyper
- Denmark – Mette Friis-Mikkelsen
- England – Emma Ashby
- France – Anne Jandera
- Germany – Caren Buffor
- Greece – Elena Liafou
- Holland – Wendy Niesthoven
- Ireland – Camilla Conolly Carew
- Italy – Tatiana Zaghet
- Luxembourg – Nathalie Quiring
- Portugal – Susanna Silva
- Spain – Yolanda Marcos Gonzales
