= Miss Grand South Africa =

National beauty contest in South Africa

- Formation: September 17, 2015; 11 years ago
- Founder: Anel de Swardt
- Type: Beauty pageant
- Headquarters: Pretoria
- Location: South Africa
- Members: Miss Grand International; Miss Asia Pacific International
- Official language: English
- National Director: Lenie Pieterse
- Parent organization: Maggy-Dee Productions (2017 – Present)

Miss Grand South Africa
licensees timeline

Stand-alone pageant
Appointed titleholder
Under another pageant

Miss Grand South Africa is an annual female beauty pageant in South Africa founded in 2015 by Commonwealth Pageant South Africa, led by Anel de Swardt, aiming to select the country representative to compete in its parent contest Miss Grand International. The license was transferred to Zee World in 2016, and later to Maggy-Dee Productions, led by Miss Grand South Africa 2015 "Lenie Pieterse" who currently owns and runs the contest since 2017.

South Africa got placements at Miss Grand International twice including top 20 finalists by "Belinde Schreuder" in 2019 and the fourth runner-up by "Jeanè Van Dam" in 2021.

== History ==
South Africa made its debutant at Miss Grand International in 2015 by Magdalena Lenie Pieterse, who had been serving as the director of the Miss Grand South Africa beauty contest since 2017. After winning the 2015 title at the parallel contest of the Commonwealth Pageant South Africa, Miss & Mrs. Grand South Africa 2015–16, held in the Lyric Theatre at Gold Reef City amusement park of Johannesburg on 17 September 2015, Pieterse entered the Miss Grand International 2015 world final round in Bangkok, Thailand, then became the director of the national preliminary contest for such an international pageant two years later.

In 2016, An English-Bollywood TV channel in Johannesburg, Zee World, obtained one year license for the Miss Grand International 2016, the national contest was held on 6 August 2016 at Atterbury Theatre in Pretoria featuring 6 national finalists, in which Caitlin Harty, a professional model based in Johannesburg, was announced as the titleholder. However, Zee World lost the license to Magdalena Pieterse in the following year. Under the direction of Pieterse, her first affiliated titleholder, Yajna Debideen, was appointed to the position instead of conducting the national contest. Debideen was the first runner-up Miss Supranational South Africa 2017.

In the following year, the organizer company, Maggy-Dee Productions, was founded by Pieterse, and became responsible for managing the national contest. The first pageant under the direction of such an organ took place on 4 August 2018 at Atterbury Theatre in Pretoria, and the contest has been held annually since then. South Africa got placements twice at the Miss Grand International contest, including Top 20 finalists by Belinde Schreuder in 2019 and the fourth runner-up by Jeanè Van Dam in 2021.

Since acquiring the license, the Miss Grand South Africa pageant, under the direction of Lenie Pieterse, has been aiming to empower women with the knowledge to bring about changes to communities in need by becoming a charity and cultural ambassador within South Africa. Several national finalists are currently working with the local non-profit organizations (NGOs) or providing the necessities support for those organs. For instance, the 2021 finalist, Storm Hurlbatt, an established financial advisor, who created the MakeNoise360 campaign to change the culture of violence and injustice in society. as well as Genive Trimble, the other 2021 finalist, who is affiliated with the Humanitarian Empowerment Fund, the organization that was founded to holistically change and empower communities, families, and industries through helping with food supply, security, education, and rehabilitation.

== Editions ==
=== Date and venue ===
Year	Edition	Date	Venue	Host province	Entrants	Ref.
2015	1st	11 September	Lyric Theatre of Gold Reef City amusement park, Johannesburg	Gauteng	8	
2016	2nd	6 August	Atterbury Theatre, Pretoria	Gauteng	6	
2018	3rd	4 August	Atterbury Theatre, Pretoria	Gauteng	14	
2019	4th	25 May	Atterbury Theatre, Pretoria	Gauteng	10	
2020	5th	30 August	The event was held virtually due to the COVID-19 pandemic.		14	
2021	6th	14 August	Atterbury Theatre, Pretoria	Gauteng	26	
2022	7th	9 July	Lake Umuzi Waterfront Hotel, Secunda	Mpumalanga	38	
2023	8th	22 July	Atterbury Theatre, Pretoria	Gauteng	25	
2024	9th	1 June	Theatre of Marcellus, Emperors Palace, Johannesburg	Gauteng	28	
2025	10th	28 June	Theatre of Marcellus, Emperors Palace, Johannesburg	Gauteng	35	
2026	11th	20 June	Heartfelt Arena Theatre, Pretoria	Gauteng	20	

=== Competition result ===
Year	Miss Grand South Africa	Runners-up				Ref.
Year	Miss Grand South Africa	1st runner-up	2nd runner-up	3rd runner-up	4th runner-up	Ref.
2015	Magdalena Pieterse^{[α]}	Danielle Leach	Rina van Schalkwyk	Not awarded		
2016	Caitlin Harty	Precious Khoza	Thando Tsiane	Not awarded		
2018	Misha Christie	Natasché Daniels	Refentse Fensi Molehe	Nedien Andrews	Rhulani Mathevula	
2019	Belinde Schreuder^{[γ]}	Jeané Van Dam	Phomolo Bianca Tjie	Beauron Julies	Shaleen de Witt	
2020	Anronet Roelofsz	Nompumelelo Malindi	Sthabile Mnyandu	Not awarded		
2021	Jeanè Van Dam	Lu Juan Mzyk	Danielle Van Zyl	Genive Trimble	Jordan Van Rensburg	
2022	Lu Juan Mzyk	Bianca Ramalho	Sphilangomusa Khwezi Msweli	Anita Meyer	Sharné Dheochand	
2023	Gugulethu Mayisela	Thulani Ndzotyana	Joey Roman	Robyn Hill	Monique Best	
2024	Sharné Dheochand	Karabo Lawal	Suhané Bosch	Sinamile Dlamini	Lesego Nyathela	
2025	Boitshepo Lamolao	Genive Trimble	Levern Donnatella José	Chanél Herrmann	Kagiso Mashishi	
2026	Estèe-Mari Smit	Karabo Lawal	Abigail van Emmenis	Caitlin Lubisi	Anesipho Dyosi	
Notes: 1. ^α Currently, the national director of Miss Grand South Africa.; 2. ^γ Previously World Super Model 2017, Miss Supranational South Africa 2018, and Miss Intercontinental South Africa 2018.

=== Winner gallery ===
Miss Grand South Africa 2026
Estèe-Mari Smit

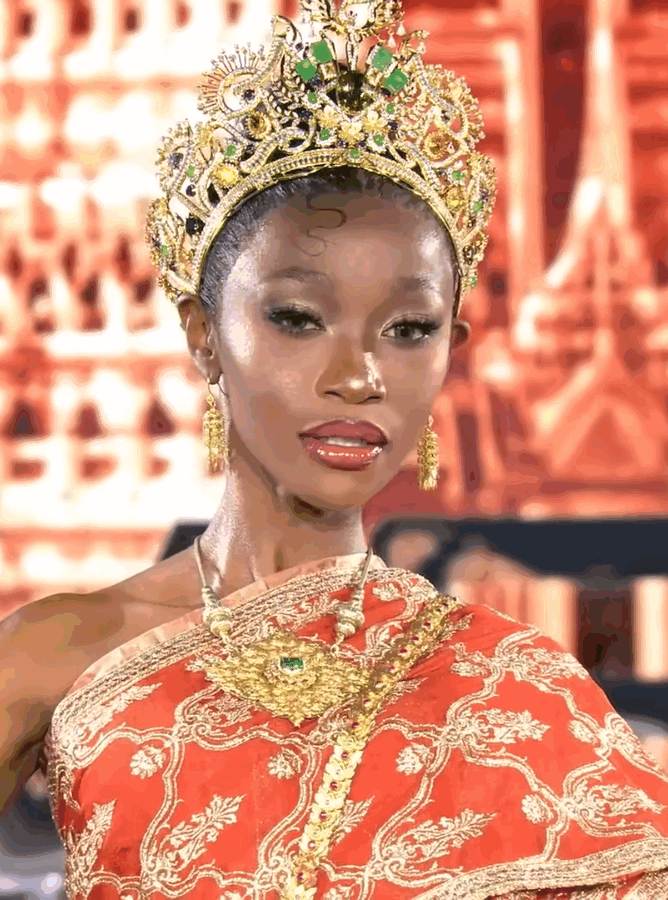
Miss Grand South Africa 2025
Boitshepo Lamola

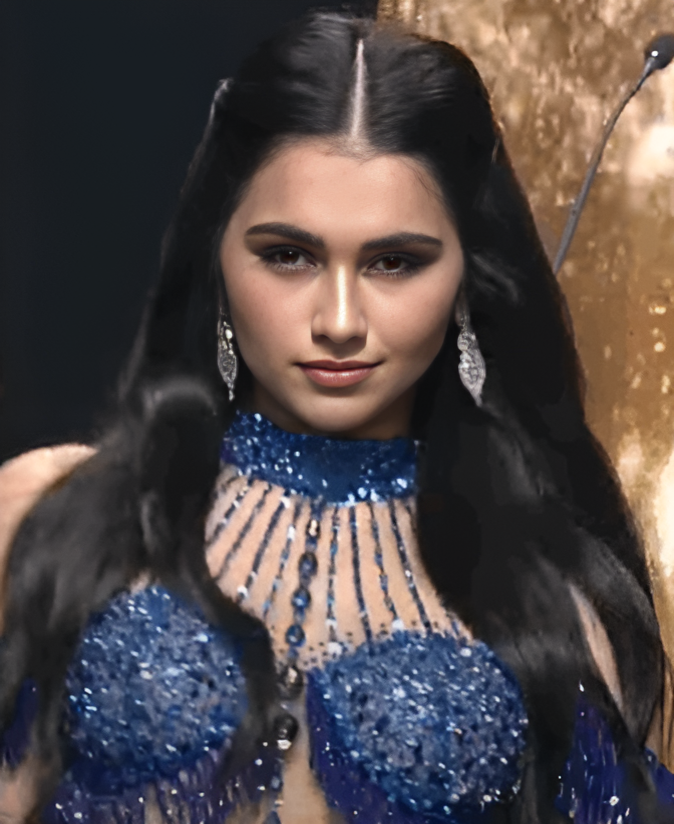
Miss Grand South Africa 2024
Sharné Dheochand

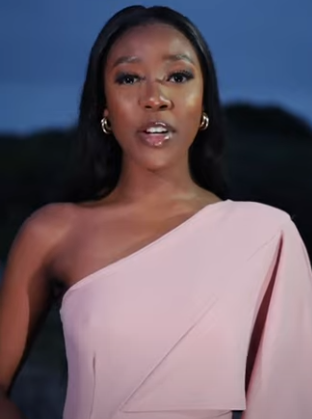
Miss Grand South Africa 2023
Gugulethu Mayisela

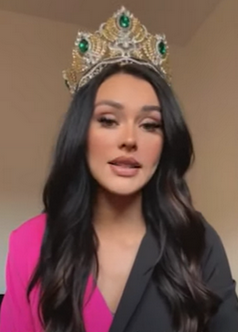
Miss Grand South Africa 2022
Lu Juan Mzyk

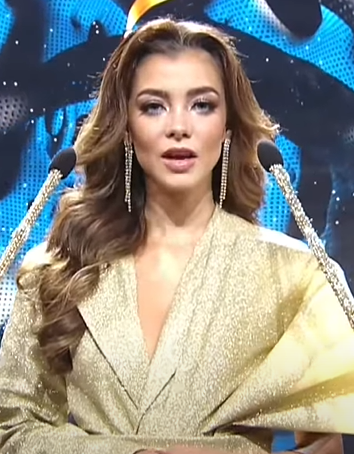
Miss Grand South Africa 2021
Jeanè Van Dam

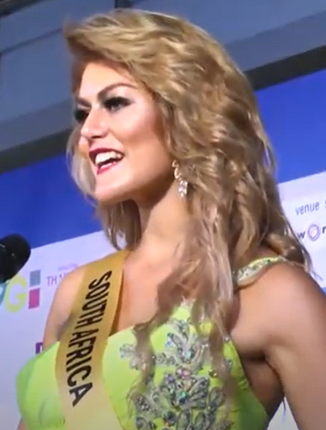
Miss Grand South Africa 2015
Lenie Pieterse

== International competition ==
The following list shows South Africa's representatives at the Miss Grand International pageant.

Year	Representative	Original national title	Competition performance		National director	Ref.
Year	Representative	Original national title	Placement	Special award(s)	National director	Ref.
2014	Ane Reynolds	Appointed	Did not compete		Invited	
2015	Magdalena Pieterse	Miss Grand South Africa 2015	Unplaced	—	Anel de Swardt	
2016	Caitlin Harty	Miss Grand South Africa 2016	Unplaced	—	Harish Goyal	
2017	Yajna Debideen	1st runner-up Miss Supranational South Africa 2017	Unplaced	—	Lenie Pieterse	
2018	Misha Christie	Miss Grand South Africa 2018	Unplaced	—	Lenie Pieterse	
2019	Belinde Schreuder	Miss Grand South Africa 2019	Top 20	—	Lenie Pieterse	
2020	Anronet Roelofsz	Miss Grand South Africa 2020	Unplaced	—	Lenie Pieterse	
2021	Jeanè Van Dam	Miss Grand South Africa 2021	4th runner-up	—	Lenie Pieterse	
2022	Lu Juan Mzyk	Miss Grand South Africa 2022	Unplaced	—	Lenie Pieterse	
2023	Gugulethu Mayisela	Miss Grand South Africa 2023	Unplaced	—	Lenie Pieterse	
2024	Sharné Dheochand	Miss Grand South Africa 2024	Unplaced	—	Lenie Pieterse	
2025	Boitshepo Lamolao	Miss Grand South Africa 2025	Unplaced	—	Lenie Pieterse	
2026	Estèe-Mari Smit	Miss Grand South Africa 2026	Unplaced		Lenie Pieterse	
