= Miss Grand South Africa 2015 =

1st Miss Grand South Africa competition, beauty pageant edition

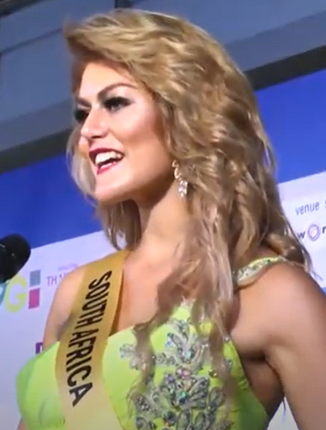
- Magdalena Lenie Pieterse, the winner of the contest
- Date: 11 September 2015
- Venue: Lyric Theatre, Gold Reef City amusement park, Johannesburg
- Broadcaster: YouTube
- Entrants: 8
- Placements: 3
- Winner: Magdalena Lenie Pieterse (Free State)

Miss Grand South Africa 2015 was the inaugural edition of the Miss Grand South Africa beauty pageant, held on September 11, 2015, at the Lyric Theatre in Gold Reef City amusement park, Johannesburg. Eight candidates, who qualified for the national pageant via an online screening performed earlier in April, competed for the title, and a 22-year-old business student from the province of Free State, Magdalena Lenie Pieterse, was elected the winner, while the Eastern Cape representative, Danielle Leach, was named the vice-miss. Lenie Pieterse then represented the country at the Miss Grand International 2015 pageant held in Thailand on October 25 but was unplaced.

The event was managed by a Johannesburg-based event organizer chaired by Anel de Swardt, Commonwealth Pageants South Africa (Pty) Ltd.

In the same event, the winner of the Mistress category, Rina van Schalkwyk, was also named. She then represented the country at the Mrs. Universe 2017 pageant held in Durban, South Africa, where she was named the third runner-up.
