= Miss Grand South Africa 2016 =

2nd Miss Grand South Africa competition, beauty pageant edition

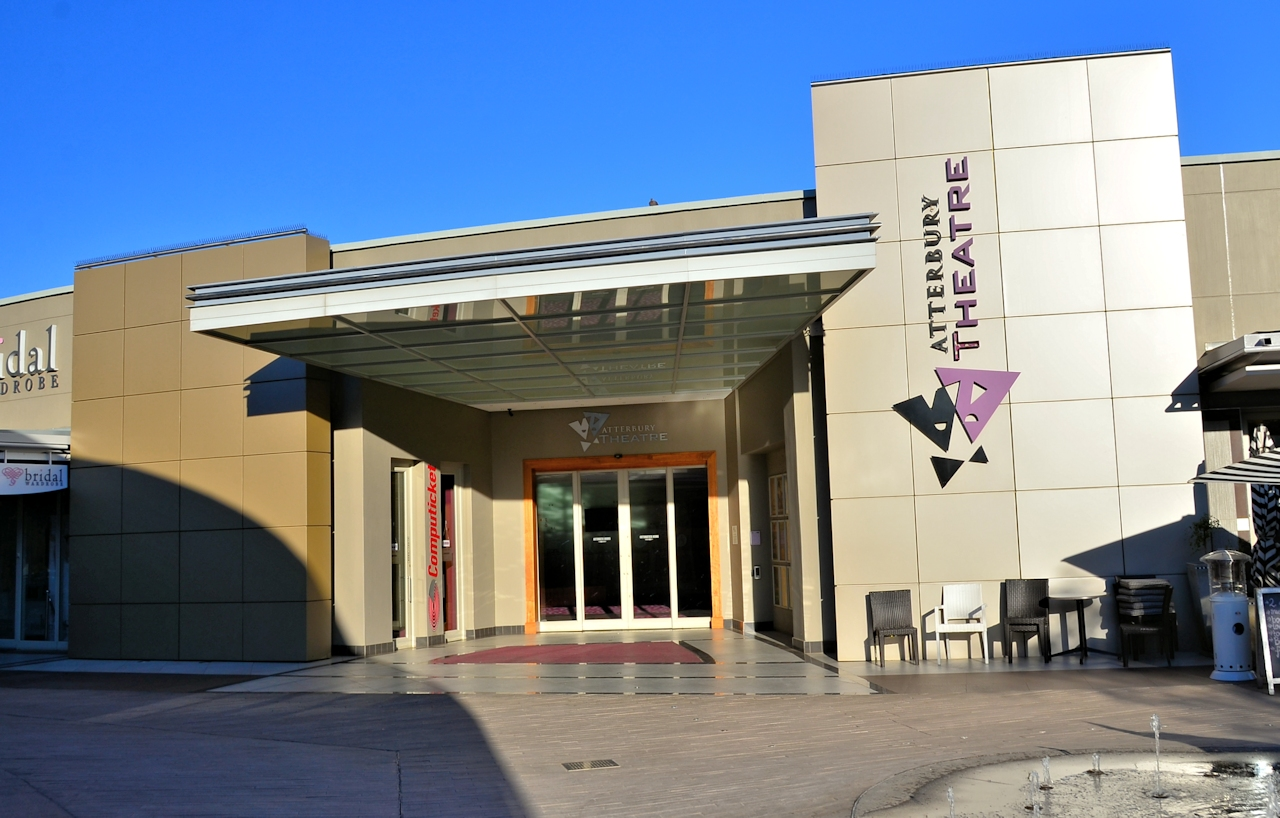
- Atterbury Theatre, the venue of the contest
- Date: 6 August 2016
- Presenters: Mpoentle Plaatjie
- Venue: Atterbury Theatre, Pretoria
- Broadcaster: Zee World
- Entrants: 7
- Placements: 3
- Winner: Caitlin Harty (Limpopo)

Miss Grand South Africa 2016 was the second edition of the Miss Grand South Africa beauty pageant, held on August 6, 2016, at the Atterbury Theatre, Pretoria. Seven candidates, who qualified for the national pageant via an online screening performed earlier in April, competed for the title, and a professional model from the province of Limpopo, Caitlin Harty, was elected the winner, while the Mpumalanga representative, Precious Khoza, and the Gauteng representative, Thando Tsiane, were named the first and second runners-up, respectively. Harty then represented the country at the Miss Grand International 2016 pageant held in Las Vegas, United States, on October 25, but was unplaced.

The grand final telecast of the pageant was hosted by Miss Teen Commonwealth South Africa 2016 1st-princess, Mpoentle Plaatjie, and was live-transmitted to the audience nationwide via Zee World.

Originally, the pageant was scheduled to be held at the Lyric Theatre of the Gold Reef City amusement park in Johannesburg, but after Zee World became the main sponsor of the pageant, the final venue was instead moved to Pretoria.

== Candidates ==
Seven candidates competed for the title of Miss Grand South Africa 2016.

- Eastern Cape – Andile Mncube
- Free State – Nothile Mkhize
- Gauteng – Thando Tsiane
- KwaZulu-Natal – Charmaine Mureyi (withdrew)
- Limpopo – Caitlin Harty
- Mpumalanga – Precious Khoza
- North West – Thobile Ntuli
- Western Cape – Imi Mpakathi
