= Anastasia Sidiropoulou =

Greek model (born 1992)

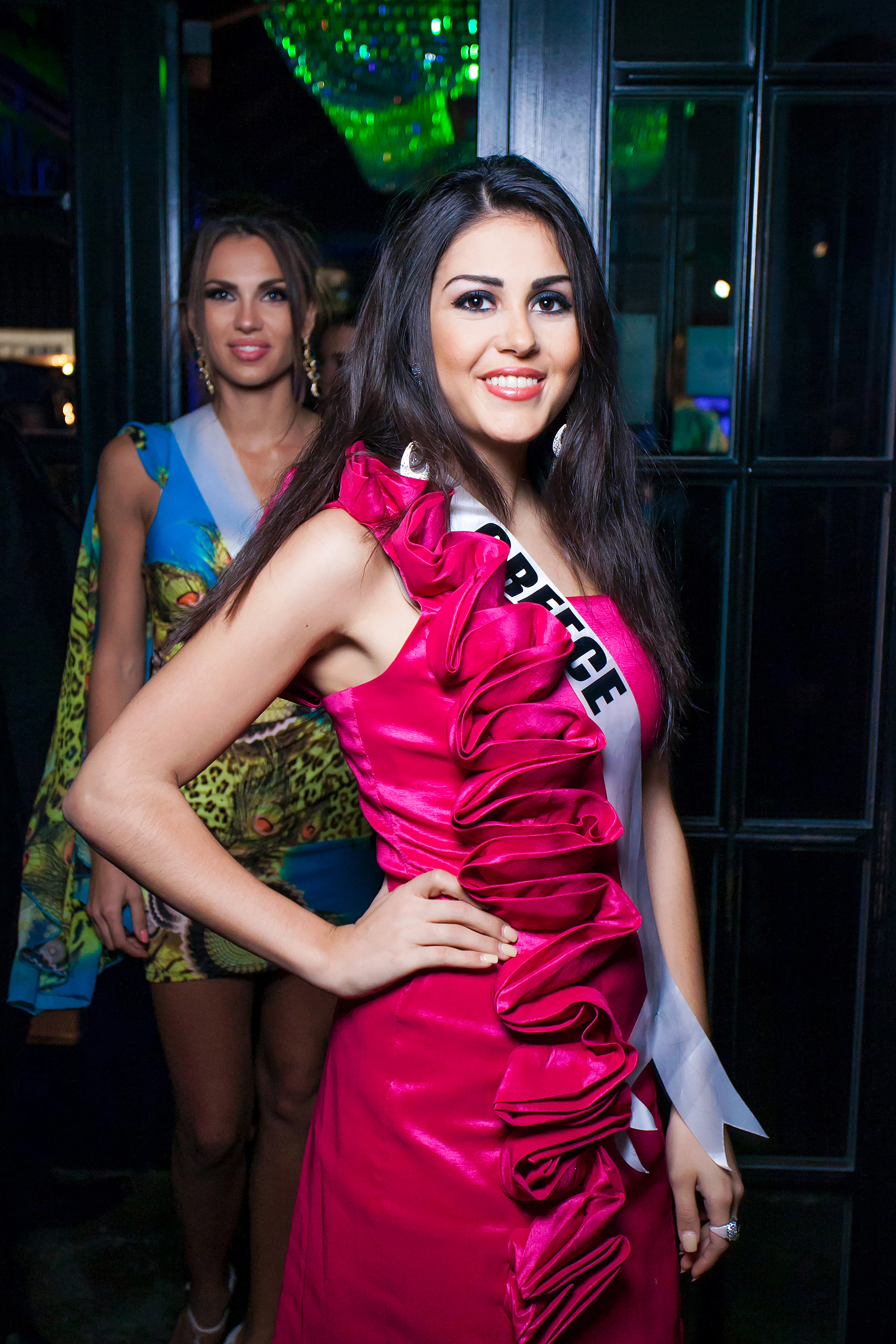
- Born: Anastasia Sidiropoulou; October 28, 1992 (age 33); Athens, Greece
- Height: 1.73 m (5 ft 8 in)
- Beauty pageant titleholder
- Title: Miss Young 2010; Star Hellas 2013
- Hair color: Black
- Eye color: Brown
- Major competitions: Miss Universe 2013 (Unplaced)

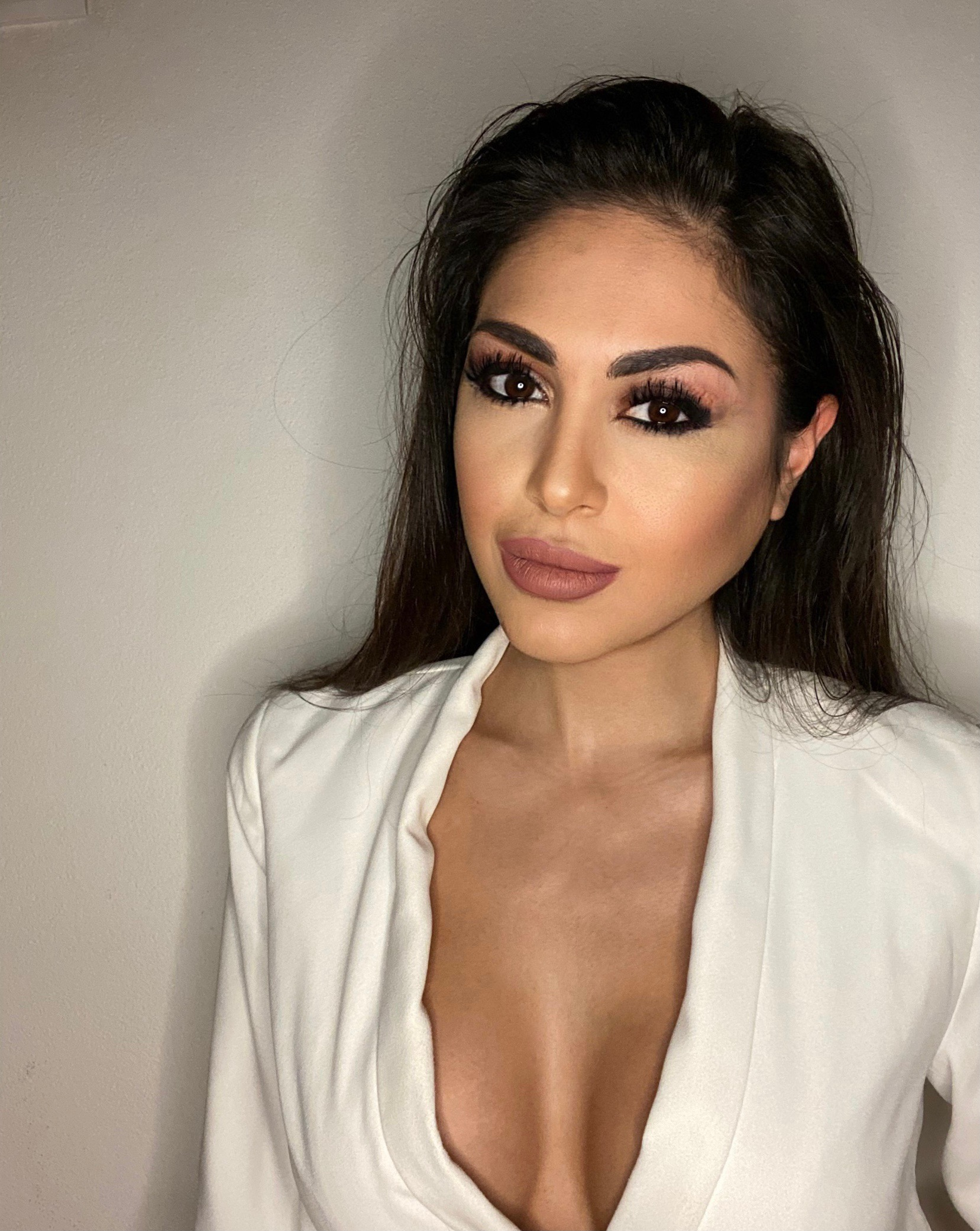
2021

Anastasia Sidiropoulou (Greek: Αναστασία Σιδηροπούλου; born October 28, 1992) is a Greek model and beauty pageant titleholder who was crowned Star Hellas 2013 and represented her country at the Miss Universe 2013 pageant.

She studied dentistry in Comenius University in Bratislava, Slovakia and specialized in orthodontics.

== Early life ==
Anastasia is the daughter of Dr. Nikos Sidiropoulos. Her parents are both dentists. She is studying dentistry in Bratislava.

== Miss Young 2010 ==
Anastasia was previously "Miss Young 2010" (Miss Teen Greece).

== Miss Teen World 2011 ==
Anastasia Sidiropoulou then became Miss Teen World 2011, which took place in Houston, on Friday, August 13, 2010. She beat 24 other teenagers from around the world to win the sash and title.

Awards and achievements
Preceded by Vasiliki Tsirogianni	Star Hellas; 2013	Succeeded by Ismini Dafopoulou
