= Miss Europe 1997 =

International beauty pageant

- Date: September 6, 1997
- Venue: Ukraina Palace of Culture, Kyiv, Ukraine
- Entrants: 29
- Placements: 12
- Debuts: Croatia; Macedonia FYRO; Slovenia
- Withdrawals: Albania; Denmark; England; Finland; Germany; Iceland; Ireland; Norway; Sweden; Switzerland; Wales
- Returns: Hungary
- Winner: Isabelle Darras; Greece
- Congeniality: Alexandra Schwartztokh; Israel

Miss Europe 1997 was the 52nd edition of the Miss Europe pageant and the 41st edition under the Mondial Events Organization. It was held at the Ukraina Palace of Culture in Kyiv, Ukraine on September 6, 1997. Isabelle Darras of Greece was crowned Miss Europe 1997 by outgoing titleholder Marie-Claire Harrison of England.

== Results ==
=== Placements ===
Placement	Contestant
Miss Europe 1997	Greece – Isabelle Darras
1st Runner-Up	Poland – Agnieszka Zielinska
2nd Runner-Up	Spain – Patricia Jañez Rodríguez
3rd Runner-Up	Italy – Flavia Mantovan
4th Runner-Up	Croatia – Natalija Bedekovic
Top 12	Czech Republic – Kristina Fridvalská; France – Delphine Brossard-Martinez; Portugal – Lara Antunes; Russia – Alexandra Valeryievna Petrova; Slovakia – Monika Sulikova; Slovenia – Natasa Smirnov; Ukraine – Nataliya Nadtochey

=== Special awards ===
Award	Contestant
Miss Friendship	Israel – Alexandra Schwartztokh

== Contestants ==
- Armenia – Angelina Babajanyan
- Belarus – Anna Dierekh
- Belgium – Annelor Van den Bossche
- Bulgaria – Madlena Kalinova
- Croatia – Natalija Bedekovic
- Cyprus – Paraskevi Efstathiou
- Czech Republic – Kristina Fridvalská
- Estonia – Natalya Barkova
- France – Delphine Brossard-Martinez
- Georgia – Nino Tskitishvili
- Greece – Isabelle Darras
- Holland – Leonie Maria Boon
- Hungary – Klaudia Angelika Toth
- Israel – Alexandra Schwartztokh
- Italy – Flavia Mantovan
- Latvia – Inga Kruma
- Lithuania – Eva Bzezinska
- Luxembourg – Sonja Closener
- Macedonia FYRO – Aleksandra Petko Petrovska
- Malta – Michelle Buttigieg
- Poland – Agnieszka Zielinska
- Portugal – Lara Antunes
- Romania – Daciana Honcvic
- Russia – Alexandra Valeryievna Petrova
- Slovak Republic – Monika Sulikova
- Slovenia – Natasa Smirnov
- Spain – Patricia Jañez Rodríguez
- Turkey – Nilay Ceylan
- Ukraine – Nataliya Nadtochey

== Notes ==
=== Withdrawals ===
The following countries withdrew after their designated delegate quit the competition due to threats of their safety, and poor food and accommodations. They later complained foreign diplomats about their concerns:

- Denmark – Mette Ravn Ibsen
- England – Emma Scott
- Finland – Taija Jurmu
- Germany – Agathe Neuner
- Iceland – Harpa Lind Hardardóttir
- Ireland – Michelle Murphy
- Norway – Anne Mette Tveiten
- Sweden – Jessica Johansson
- Switzerland – Yara Lederberger
- Wales – Kate Ann Peyton

Other withdrawals:

- Albania – no delegate sent

=== Debuts ===
- Croatia
- Macedonia FYRO
- Slovenia

=== Returns ===
- Hungary
