= Miss Grand South Africa 2019 =

4th Miss Grand South Africa competition, beauty pageant edition

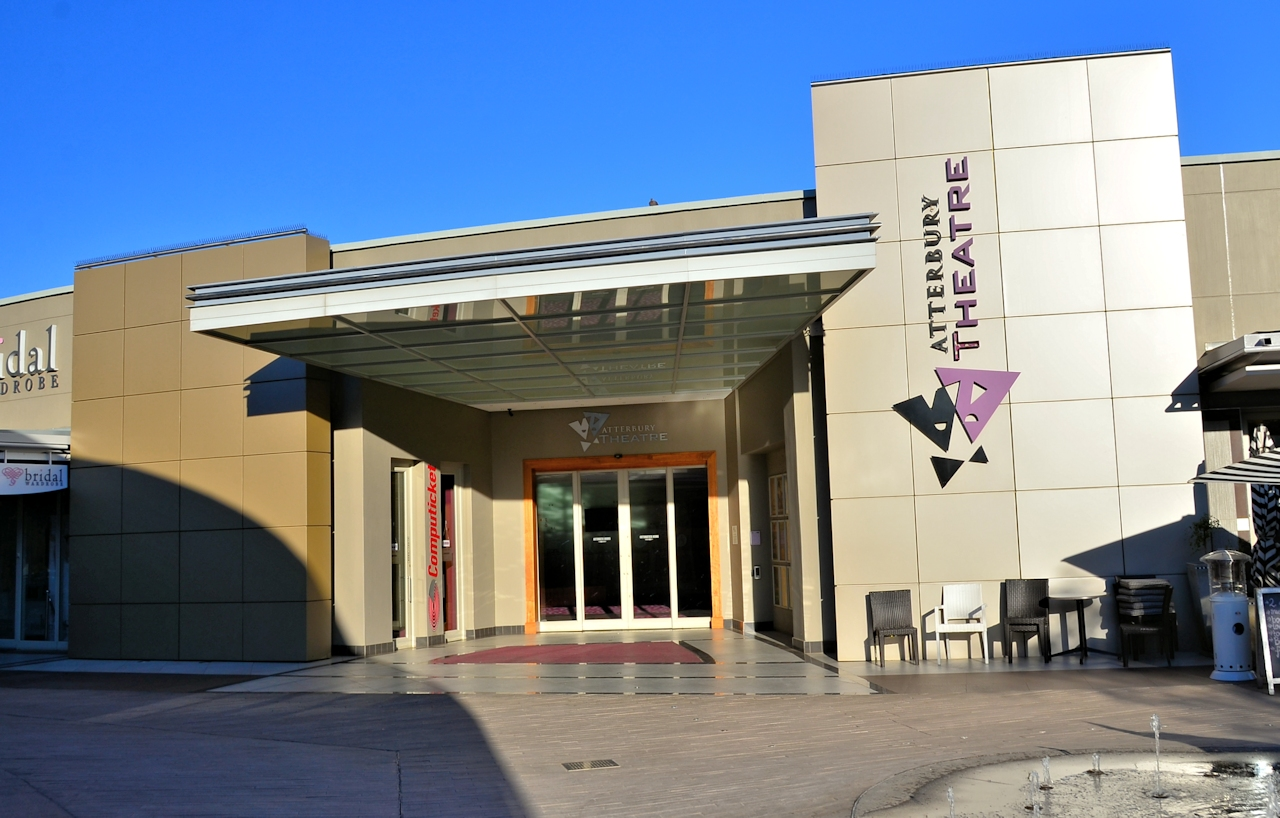
- Atterbury Theatre, the venue of the contest
- Date: May 25, 2019
- Venue: Atterbury Theatre, Pretoria
- Broadcaster: YouTube
- Entrants: 9
- Placements: 5
- Winner: Belinde Schreuder (Gauteng)
- Photogenic: Anzelle Krige (Tshwane)

Miss Grand South Africa 2019 result
| Winner | 3rd runners-up |
| 1st runner-up | 4th runner-up |
| 2nd runner-up | Unplaced |

Miss Grand South Africa 2019 was the fourth edition of the Miss Grand South Africa beauty pageant, held on May 25, 2019, at the Atterbury Theatre, Pretoria. Nine candidates competed for the title, of whom a 23-year-old diploma in Public Relations from the Boston City Campus and Business College representing Gauteng province, Belinde Schreuder, was elected the winner. Meanwhile, the representatives of Johannesburg, Jeané Van Dam, and Limpopo province, Phomolo Bianca Tjie, were named the runners-up.

Schreuder later represented South Africa at the international parent contest, Miss Grand International 2019, held in Caracas, Venezuela, on October 25 of that year, and was placed among the top 20 finalists, making her the first South African representative to obtain placement in Miss Grand International.

== Result ==
| Position | Candidate |
|---|---|
| Miss Grand South Africa 2019 | Gauteng – Belinde Schreuder |
| 1st runner-up | Johannesburg – Jeané Van Dam |
| 2nd runner-up | Limpopo – Phomolo Bianca Tjie |
| 3rd runner-up | Northern Cape – Beauron Julies |
| 4th runner-up | Ekurhuleni – Shaleen de Witt |

== Candidates ==
Nine candidates competed for the title of Miss Grand South Africa 2019.

- Ekurhuleni – Shaleen de Witt
- Gauteng – Belinde Schreuder
- Johannesburg – Jeané Van Dam
- Limpopo – Phomolo Bianca Tjie
- North West – Peggy Chauke
- Northern Cape – Beauron Julies
- Pretoria – Simoné van Wyk
- Sedibeng – Tharina Botes (withdrew)
- Tshwane – Anzelle Krige
- West Rand – Juan-Marie Nagel
