= Gugulethu Mayisela =

South African beauty pageant titleholder (2004)

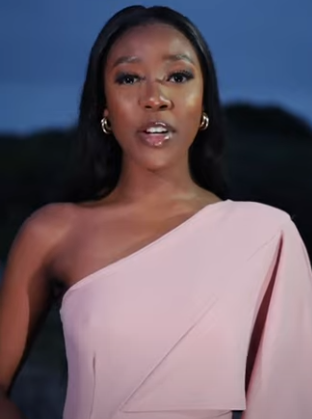
- Gugulethu Mayisela in 2023
- Born: Gugulethu Mayisela; April 19, 2004 (age 22); Johannesburg, South Africa
- Height: 1.70 m (5 ft 7 in)
- Beauty pageant titleholder
- Title: Miss Teen World 2022; Miss Grand South Africa 2023
- Hair color: Black
- Eye color: Brown
- Major competitions: Miss Teen World 2022 (Winner); Miss Grand South Africa 2023 (Winner); Miss Grand International 2023 (Unplaced)

Gugulethu Mayisela (born 19 April 2004) is a South African beauty pageant titleholder who was crowned the first black woman to win the Miss Teen World 2022 in Ecuador. She was also crowned Miss Grand South Africa 2023 and represented South Africa at Miss Grand International 2023 in Vietnam and was unplaced.

== Pageantry ==
=== Miss Teen World 2022 ===
Gugulethu became Miss Teen World 2022, which took place in Ecuador, on October 19, 2022. She beat other teenagers from around the world to win the title.

=== Miss Grand South Africa 2023 ===
On July 22, 2023, Mayisela represented Gauteng at the Miss Grand South Africa 2023 pageant held at the Atterbury Theatre in South Africa's capital, Pretoria. At the end of the event, she was crowned Miss Grand South Africa 2023, succeeding Lu Juan Mzyk of Pretoria.

Awards and achievements
Preceded by (Colombia) Luna Velandia	Miss Teen World; 2022	Succeeded by (South Africa) Nachalee Creser
Preceded by Lu Juan Mzyk	Miss Grand South Africa; 2023	Succeeded by Sharné Dheochand
