= Miss Grand South Africa 2025 =

9th Miss Grand South Africa competition, beauty pageant edition

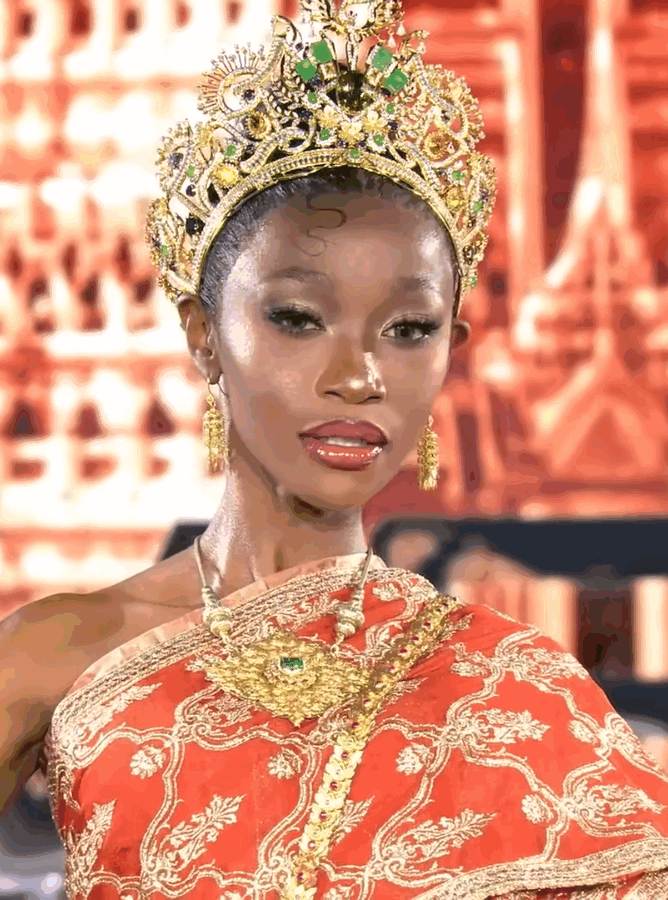
- Boitshepo Lamola, the winner of the contest
- Date: 28 June 2025
- Venue: Theatre of Marcellus, Emperors Palace, Johannesburg
- Entrants: 31
- Placements: 11
- Winner: Boitshepo Lamolao (Soshanguve)

Miss Grand South Africa 2025 was the 10th Miss Grand South Africa pageant, held on 28 June 2025 at the Theatre of Marcellus, Emperors Palace, Johannesburg. Thirty-one contestants from different districts of the country competed for the title.

The contest was won by a 20-year-old model representing Soshanguve, Boitshepo Lamolao, who was crowned by the predecessor, Sharné Dheochand of Newcastle. Lamolao will internationally represent South Africa at the parent stage, Miss Grand International 2025, to be held in Bangkok, Thailand, on 18 October 2025.

== Background ==
An application for this year's edition was opened from 15 November to 31 December 2024. The list of qualified finalists, which consisted of 35 candidates from different districts of the country, was then revealed on 13 January 2025. The central organizer directly elected all national aspirants, as done in all previous editions; no regional preliminary pageant was conducted to elect the local representative.

The Theatre of Marcellus, Emperors Palace, in Johannesburg, will host the final round of the pageant on June 28, 2025, as announced in late January 2025.

== Result ==
| Position | Delegate |
|---|---|
| Miss Grand South Africa 2025 | Soshanguve – Boitshepo Lamolao |
| Miss Asia Pacific South Africa 2025 | Boksburg – Bejandri Lourens |
| 1st runner-up | Wilro Park – Genive Trimble |
| 2nd runner-up | Hercules – Levern Donnatella José |
| 3rd runner-up | Alberton – Chanél Herrmann |
| 4th runner-up | Kempton Park – Kagiso Mashishi |
| Top 11 | No data available |

== Contestants ==
Thirty-one contestants have confirmed their participation, with the majority coming from the province of Gauteng. No contestant from the provinces of North West, Free State, and Northern Cape.

| Gauteng Province | KwaZulu-Natal Province | Number of contestants by district Color key: District with 8 contestants District with 5 contestants District with 4 contestants District with 2 contestants District with 1 contestant No representative |
| Alberton – Chanél Herrmann; Boksburg – Bejandri Lourens; Brackendowns – Shanice Singh; Dainfern – Luyanda Mthembu; Ekangala – Nomasonto Tshabalala; Hercules – Levern José; Kempton Park – Kagiso Mashishi; Krugersdorp – Betty Ngonhamo; Lonehill – Jo-Lene Van Der Walt; Lyndhurst – Machindo Belange Kahenga; Mabopane – Letta Tshwane; Morningside – Nandi Zureida Magwaza; Randfontein – Keaoleboga Badise; Rivonia – Amandla Malindi; Roodepoort – Tanzile Mngomezulu; Soshanguve – Boitshepo Lamolao; Troyeville – Prosperity Phahlane; Waterkloof Glen – Keneilwe Gaesite; Wilro Park – Genive Trimble | Amanzimtoti – Robyn Hill; Cowies Hill – Tara-Linn Mehl; Port Shepstone – Tamaryn Price | Number of contestants by district Color key: District with 8 contestants District with 5 contestants District with 4 contestants District with 2 contestants District with 1 contestant No representative |
| | Eastern Cape Province | Number of contestants by district Color key: District with 8 contestants District with 5 contestants District with 4 contestants District with 2 contestants District with 1 contestant No representative |
| | Despatch – Arielle De Villiers; East London – Chumasande Somazembe; Ntabankulu – Siphesihle Majala | Number of contestants by district Color key: District with 8 contestants District with 5 contestants District with 4 contestants District with 2 contestants District with 1 contestant No representative |
| | Limpopo Province | Number of contestants by district Color key: District with 8 contestants District with 5 contestants District with 4 contestants District with 2 contestants District with 1 contestant No representative |
| | Burgersfort – Letato Moahloli; Mamone – Happiness Mariri; Mokopane – Reneilwe Sekwakwa | Number of contestants by district Color key: District with 8 contestants District with 5 contestants District with 4 contestants District with 2 contestants District with 1 contestant No representative |
| | Mpumalanga Province | Number of contestants by district Color key: District with 8 contestants District with 5 contestants District with 4 contestants District with 2 contestants District with 1 contestant No representative |
| | Bushbuckridge – Phodiso Makhubedu | Number of contestants by district Color key: District with 8 contestants District with 5 contestants District with 4 contestants District with 2 contestants District with 1 contestant No representative |
| | Western Cape Province | Number of contestants by district Color key: District with 8 contestants District with 5 contestants District with 4 contestants District with 2 contestants District with 1 contestant No representative |
| | Durbanville – Charné Malan; Woodstock – Phenyo Maila | Number of contestants by district Color key: District with 8 contestants District with 5 contestants District with 4 contestants District with 2 contestants District with 1 contestant No representative |
| Withdrawn contestants | | Number of contestants by district Color key: District with 8 contestants District with 5 contestants District with 4 contestants District with 2 contestants District with 1 contestant No representative |
| Amrisha Baboolall; Masechaba Tsebe; Moloke Maps Ramaboea; Ofentse Selatole | | Number of contestants by district Color key: District with 8 contestants District with 5 contestants District with 4 contestants District with 2 contestants District with 1 contestant No representative |
