= Defne Samyeli =

Turkish TV presenter, columnist, singer and actress

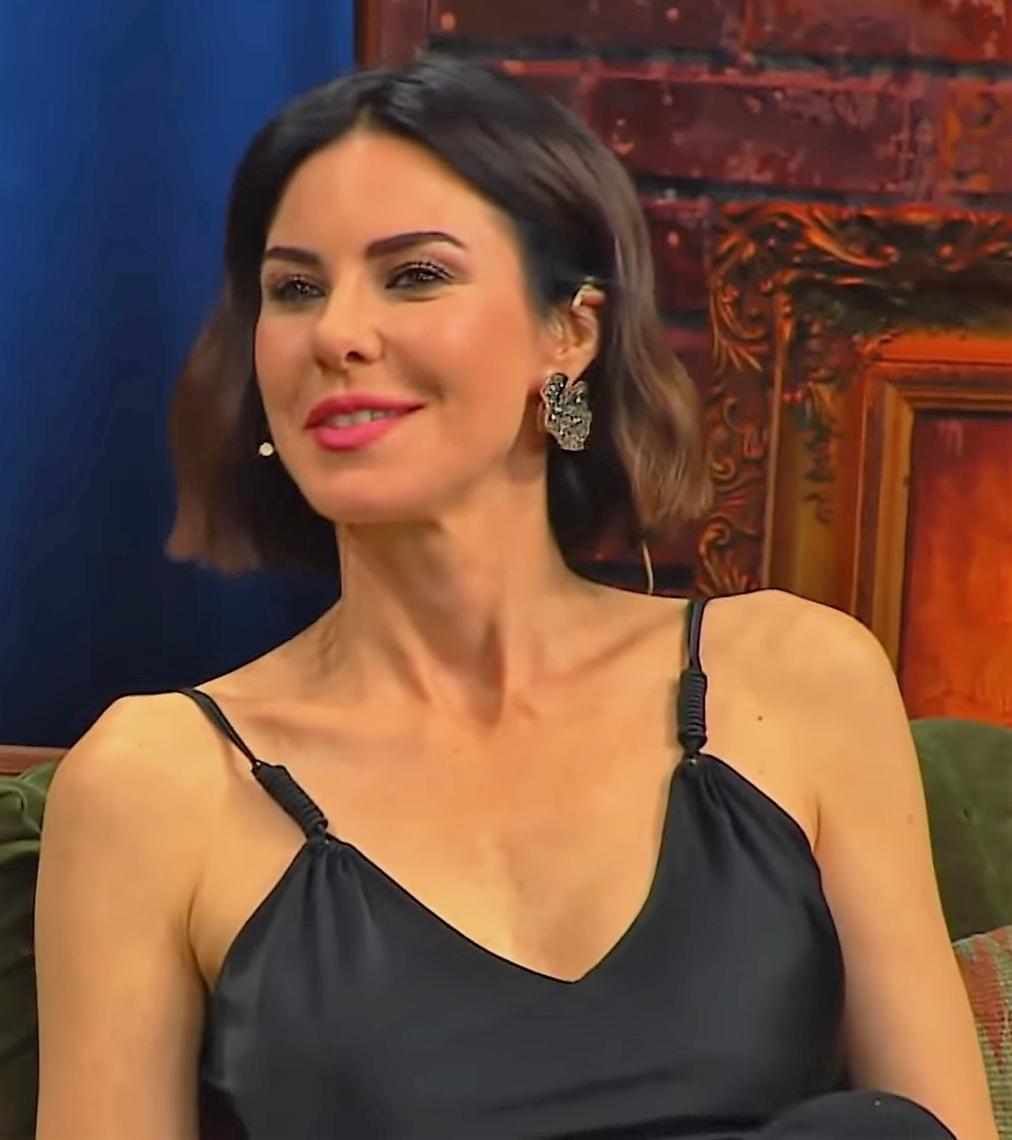
- Samyeli on Tolga Çevik's Tolgshow in 2018
- Born: 1 July 1972 (age 54); Istanbul, Turkey
- Education: Boğaziçi University
- Occupations: TV presenter, actress, columnist, singer
- Years active: 1991–present
- Spouse: Eren Talu (m. 1995; div. 2011)
- Children: 2

Defne Samyeli (born 1 July 1972) is a Turkish TV presenter, columnist, singer and actress.

== Life ==
Samyeli was born as the first child of an Istanbul admiral Haluk and hotel manager Sendegül who is from Adana's Ramazanoğullarli family. In 1991, she ranked third on Turkey's beauty pageant.

Samyeli, who started her career as a journalist and graduated from Boğaziçi University, was a news reporter in the main news bulletin of Kanal D under the direction of Tuncay Özkan. She received 2 international awards for her different news presentation in the main news bulletin of Kanal D. Samyeli has been a columnist for Milliyet newspaper, the editor and presenter of Show TV's main news bulletin, and a writer for Güneş newspaper. As of May 2010 for a while she presented the program Defne Her şey Bambaşka on ATV. Samyeli who worked as a columnist for Milliyet for so many years, parted ways with the newspaper on 3 January 2015.

== Filmography ==
=== Film ===
- 2023: Prestij Meselesi

=== TV programs ===
- 1991–1994: Salı Pazarı (Star TV)
- 1992–1993: İyi Günler Türkiye (Star TV)
- 1994: Pazar Show (Show TV)
- 1994–1995: Show'da Show (Show TV)
- 1996: Şakalamaca (Kanal D)
- 1996–1999: Defne Samyeli ile Gecenin İçinden (Kanal D)
- 1998: Defne Samyeli ile Flaş Haber (Kanal D)
- 1999–2002: Kanal D Ana Haber Bülteni (Kanal D)
- 2002: Seçim 2002 (Show TV)
- 2002–2007: Show TV Ana Haber Bülteni (Show TV)
- 2004: Seçim 2004 (Show TV)
- 2006: Vizyon (Show TV)
- 2007: Seçim 2007 (Show TV)
- 2010: Herşey Bambaşka (ATV)
- 2011: 45 Dakika (A Haber)
- 2011: Söz Teması (A Haber)

=== TV series ===
- 2013: Babam Sınıfta Kaldı (Çiğdem) (Fox TV)
- 2015–2016: Kurtlar Vadisi Pusu (Asya/Zeynep) (Kanal D)
- 2018: İstanbullu Gelin (Star TV)
- 2020: Hekimoğlu (Kanal D)
- 2020–2021: Sol Yanım (Asena) (Star TV)
- 2022–2023 : Aldatmak (Elmas Heves) (atv)

== Discography ==
- 1994 – Tek Başına
- 2015 – Son Arzum (single)
- 2019 – Ağla Ağla (single)
- 2022 – Abidin (single)

== Newspapers she has written for ==
- 2000: Milliyet
- 2002–2009: Güneş
- 2013–2015: Milliyet

== TV channels she has worked for ==
- 1991–1994: Star TV
- 1994: Teleon TV
- 1994–1995: Show TV
- 1996–2002: Kanal D
- 2002–2007: Show TV
- 2010: ATV
- 2011: A Haber
