= Marina Tsintikidou =

Greek fashion model and presenter

- Μαρίνα Τσιντικίδου
- Born: Marina Tsintikidou; November 28, 1971 (age 54); Thessaloniki, Greece
- Beauty pageant titleholder
- Title: • Star Hellas 1992 • Miss Europe 1992
- Hair color: Black
- Eye color: Brown

Marina Tsintikidou (Greek: Μαρίνα Τσιντικίδου; born November 28, 1971) is a Greek fashion model, tv host and beauty pageant titleholder. She has appeared on the covers of numerous Greek fashion magazines such as MAX. She won the title of "Star Hellas" (Σταρ Ελλάς) in the Miss Star Hellas pageant in 1992. She was the third Greek contestant to win the title of Miss Europe (1992). She also represented Greece at Miss Universe 1992.

Aside from a modeling career, Tsindikidou also tried her skills in acting, appearing in various TV shows and movies as well as in the Greek version of the theatrical play "Look Who's Here" by British playwright Ray Cooney. She has also been a TV host and presenter on numerous programs featured on Mega Channel, ANT1 and Macedonia TV.

Awards
Preceded by (Greece) Katerina Michalopoulou	Miss Europe; 1992	Succeeded by (Turkey) Arzum Onan
