= Isavella Dara =

Greek model

Isavella Dara (Greek: Ισαβέλλα Δάρα; Athens, 1978) is a Greek and French model (Isabelle Darras) and beauty contestant. She won the title of Miss Europe in 1997.

== Career ==
In 1997 the then 19-year-old was crowned 'B Miss Hellas' (Β Μις Ελλάς) in the Miss Star Hellas Pageant, sponsored by ANT1. A few months later, in Kyiv, Ukraine, she won the title of Miss Europe 1997, for the fourth time for Greece. After the competition, she was quoted as saying, "The competition was tough, but the support of the people at Antenna helped me a lot, even in Kyiv".

Isavella speaks 5 languages (Greek, French, English, Italian and some German) and aside from modeling, she also has moved into the fields of acting and music. She has obtained a piano diploma (June 2007) with the best possible grade and the compliments of the jury.

She composes music and aspires to be a classical composer and conductor. She has a degree from the Athens Conservatory as well as one from the Conservatory of Nakas. She has also performed in Greek productions such as Life of 1500 Drachmas and The Musical Library of Lilian Voudouri.

Her popularity is always important and is shown by audiences she attracts when on television (noted on the show "Proinos Cafes" an ANT1 Greek TV channel).

She is married and has a son named Achilles. Pictures of little Achilles and his mother were published in most Greek magazines during 2006, notably in "OK!" magazine published in the week of 13–19 December 2006. Achilles is the grandson of Theofillou Achilles, an important music manager.

A new career has begun for her, that of politics. On November the 7th she got elected as a Municipal adviser.

== News ==
During the 2004 Summer Olympics, the model visited the Water Plaza fun park, an Olympic venue, which housed the sculpture "The Olive: The Tree of Athens", on which she and many other celebrities signed their names. Isavella also visited the Pin Trading Center.

== Job appearances ==
- Triumph International - Triumph Bra
- Gala
- Madame magazine
- Maxim
- Playboy

Preceded by Marie-Claire Harrison	Miss Europe; 1997	Succeeded by Yelena Rogozhina
