= Miss Teen World =

Teen Beauty pageant based in Peru

- Type: International women's beauty pageant
- Headquarters: Guayaquil, Ecuador
- First edition: 2001
- Current titleholder: Sheccid López; Mexico
- Founder: César Montecé
- President: Rodrigo Moreira (2012-present)
- Language: English
- Website: missteenworld.com

Miss Teen World is a global beauty pageant for teenagers, based in Guayaquil, Ecuador. That was established in 2001 by Cesar Montece, its founder, and is currently operated by Rodrigo Moreira, who owns all intellectual property rights.

The current Miss Teen World is Sheccid López of Mexico who was crowned on November 30, 2025 in Chiclayo, Peru.

== History ==
Miss Teen World pageant was launched in the year 2001 in Ecuador and was continued in the coming year as well. Its founder César Montecé, a businessman of beauty with more than 40 years of experience in the field, died in 2010.

In October 2012, Cesar Montecé's sister, who was listed as a partner in her brother's company, sold all the rights of the contest in front of the notary public; however, the international competition was officially relaunched in Ecuador, in 2014.

== Charity Participation ==
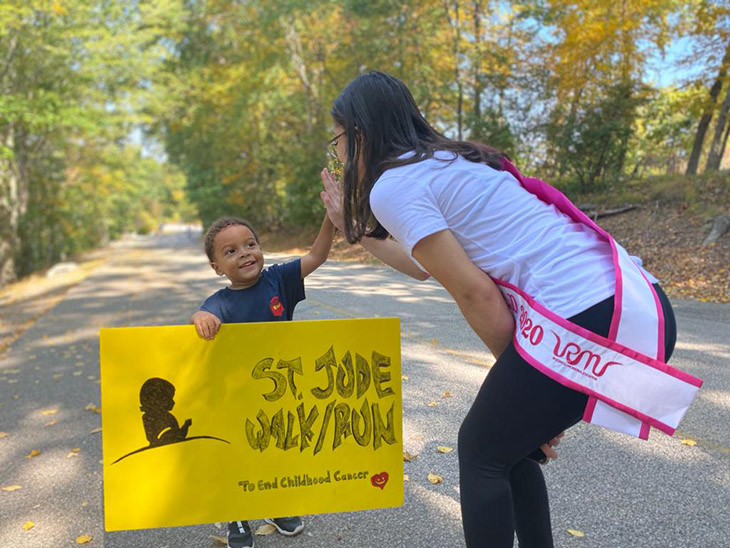
Reigning Miss Teen World 2020 Tyana Maldonado attending a charity event to raise money for St. Jude Children's Research Hospital

Miss Teen World is a competition for teens that is committed to social responsibility. It is for that reason that its founder has raised 50% of ticket sales of the competition to help the Center for Social Pediatrics and Rehabilitation called "Kinderzentrum" in conjunction with the Foundation "Herta Seebass" based in Ecuador Miss Teen World helps children between 0 and 12 years old who have Down syndrome, cerebral palsy, autism, hyperactivity, language and physical problems, congenital or acquired.

The organization is directed by Rodrigo Moreira its current president who, since he has taken office, has initiated a Pediasure collection campaign to help raise awareness about childhood cancer and donate it to children with treatment at the Hospital Sociedad de Lucha Contra el Cancer SOLCA, also each contestant brings with them gifts that are donated to children in the pediatric and intensive area. In this context, the reigning Miss Teen World 2020 Tyana Maldonado from the Dominican Republic attended the St. Jude Walk / Run 5k event held in the United States to raise money for childhood cancer research and the kids of St. Jude Children's Research Hospital, who have the opportunity to receive treatments regardless of their family's economic situation.

== Titleholders ==
| Edition | Titleholder | Country | Age (Note: Ages at the time of the pageant.) | Venue of Competition | Ref. |
|---|---|---|---|---|---|
| 2025 | Sheccid López | Mexico | 17 | Chiclayo, Peru (Note: Originally scheduled to be held in Lima, Peru, but was moved to Chiclayo due to state of emergency.) | |
| 2024 | Luana Pestana | Brazil | 17 | Lima, Peru | |
| 2023 | Nachalee Creser | South Africa | 17 | Guayaquil, Ecuador | |
| 2022 | Gugulethu Mayisela | South Africa | 18 | Guayaquil, Ecuador | |
| 2021 | Luna Velandia | Colombia | 16 | Guayaquil, Ecuador | |
| 2020 | Tyana Maldonado | Dominican Republic | 15 | Guayaquil, Ecuador | |
| 2019 | Zury Ruiz | Aruba | 18 | Guayaquil, Ecuador | |
| 2018 | No pageant held | | | | |
| 2017 | Dannelys Barrios | Panama | 19 | Panama City, Panama | |
| 2016 | Luana Passos | Brazil | 17 | Panama City, Panama | |
| 2015 | Angie Larrea Barzola | Ecuador | 19 | Guayaquil, Ecuador | |
| 2014 | Sheisa Blasini | Puerto Rico | 17 | Guayaquil, Ecuador | |
| 2013 | No pageant held | | | | |
| 2012 | María Angélica Jacotte | Venezuela | 15 | Puyo, Ecuador | |
Former Contest (under Gaspar Cruz)
| 2012 | Gabrielle Marinho | Brazil | 17 | Houston, Texas, United States | |
| 2011 | Anastasia Sidiropoulou | Greece | 17 | Houston, Texas, United States | |
| 2010 | Tayla Robinson | South Africa | 16 | Houston, Texas, United States | |
| 2009 | Amy Jackson | United Kingdom | 16 | Honolulu, Hawaii, United States | |
Original Pageant (under Cesar Montece)
| 2009 | Korina Rivadeneira Arcila | Venezuela | 17 | Guayaquil, Ecuador | |
| 2008 | Iliana Gallardo García | Ecuador | 17 | Guayaquil, Ecuador | |
| 2007 | María Julia Gonzáles Seminario | Peru | 17 | Babahoyo, Ecuador | |
| 2006 | Mariela Martínez | Puerto Rico | 17 | Guayaquil, Ecuador | |
| 2005 | Charlotte Smith | South Africa | 17 | Guayaquil, Ecuador | |
| 2004 | Noelé Joubert | South Africa | 17 | Guayaquil, Ecuador | |
| 2003 | Kaylan Hamel | South Africa | 15 | Guayaquil, Ecuador | |
| 2002 | Alia Sumar | Peru | 17 | Salinas, Ecuador | |
| 2001 | Morgana Montes | Brazil | 17 | Salinas, Ecuador | |

Country/Territory by number of wins

List of countries by number of Miss Teen World wins
| Number of win (s) | Country/Territory | Years |
|---|---|---|
| South Africa | 6 | 2003, 2004, 2005, 2010, 2022, 2023 |
| Brazil | 4 | 2001, 2012, 2016, 2024 |
| Ecuador | 2 | 2008, 2015 |
| Peru | 2 | 2002, 2007 |
| Puerto Rico | 2 | 2006, 2014 |
| Venezuela | 2 | 2009, 2012 |
| United Kingdom | 1 | 2009 |
| Greece | 1 | 2011 |
| Panama | 1 | 2017 |
| Aruba | 1 | 2019 |
| Dominican Republic | 1 | 2020 |
| Colombia | 1 | 2021 |
| Mexico | 1 | 2025 |

== List of runners-up ==
This table shows the runners-up of the competition, from its 2021 edition.

| Year | 1st runner-up | 2nd runner-up | 3rd runner-up | 4th runner-up | Ref. |
|---|---|---|---|---|---|
| 2021 | Rebeca Ruiz Moral; Paraguay | Megan Leigh van der Walt; South Africa | Niurka Piza Guerrero; Ecuador | Naomi Cano Lazcano; Mexico | |
| 2022 | Marina Wang; Canada | Estrella Cisneros; Mexico | No 3rd runner-up or 4th runner-up was selected in the competition. | | |
| 2023 | Mía Acosta; Spain | Aitana Lara; Ecuador | No 3rd runner-up or 4th runner-up was selected in the competition. | | |

=== Best International Typical Costume ===
The following contestants have won the competition.

| Year | Winner | 1st. runner up | 2nd. runner up | Venue | Host city | Ref. |
|---|---|---|---|---|---|---|
| 2021 | Kelly Medina Morquencho; Peru | Luna Velandia Cadena; Colombia | Naomi Cano Lazcano; Mexico | Universidad Estatal de Milagro - UNEMI | Milagro, Ecuador | |

== Titleholders crossover ==
Miss Teen World titleholders in the world's major beauty contests.

| Year | Miss Tourism Queen International |
|---|---|
| 2006 | Kaylan Hamel; Miss Tourism Queen SA and Miss Tourism Queen Africa 2006; South Africa |
| Year | Top Model of the World |
| 2007 | Charlotte Smith; Top Model of the World South Africa 2007; South Africa |
| Year | Miss Intercontinental |
| 2008 | Noelé Joubert; Miss Intercontinental South Africa 2008 and Top 15 at Miss Intercontinental 2008; South Africa |
| Year | Miss Universe |
| 2013 | Anastasia Sidiropoulou; Miss Universe Greece 2013; Greece |
| | Miss International |
| 2017 | Tayla Robinson; Miss International South Africa 2017; South Africa |
| | Miss Eco International |
| 2022 | Zury Ruiz; Miss Eco Aruba 2021-22 and Top 21 at Miss Eco International 2022; Aruba |
| | Miss Grand International |
| 2023 | Gugulethu Mayisela; Miss Grand South Africa 2023; South Africa |

== Mister Teen World ==
Mister Teen World is the male version that was based in Guayaquil, Ecuador, since its inception in 2003. The current Mister Teen World is SJ Pretorius of South Africa, who was crowned on 19 October 2022.

Titleholders

| Edition | Titleholder | Country | Venue of Competition | Ref. |
|---|---|---|---|---|
| 2024 | Shawn Diakanyo | South Africa | Lima, Peru | |
| 2023 | Danny Andrade | Ecuador | Guayaquil, Ecuador | |
| 2022 | SJ Pretorius | South Africa | Guayaquil, Ecuador | |
| 2021 | Mmoke Nape | South Africa | Guayaquil, Ecuador | |
| 2016 | Jadiel Párraga | Ecuador | Panama City, Panama | |
| 2007 | Almir Burneo | Peru | Babahoyo, Ecuador | |
| 2003 | Carlos Rivera | Puerto Rico | Guayaquil, Ecuador | |

== See also ==
- Miss Teenager World
