= Carlswald =

- Location within Gauteng Location within South Africa
- Coordinates: 25°58′58″S 28°06′13″E
- Country: South Africa
- Province: Gauteng
- Municipality: City of Johannesburg
- Main Place: Midrand

Area
  - Total: 4.08 km^{2} (1.58 sq mi)

Population (2011)
  - Total: 1,063
  - Density: 261/km^{2} (675/sq mi)

Racial makeup (2011)
  - Black African: 35.5%
  - Coloured: 0.8%
  - Indian/Asian: 9.8%
  - White: 51.6%
  - Other: 2.3%

First languages (2011)
  - English: 58.1%
  - Afrikaans: 10.2%
  - Zulu: 10.1%
  - Tswana: 3.4%
  - Other: 18.1%
- Time zone: UTC+2 (SAST)
- Postal code (street): 1684
- PO box: 1685

Carlswald is a suburb of Midrand, South Africa. It is located in Region A of the City of Johannesburg Metropolitan Municipality.

The area was originally part of a farm owned by Carl Eisenberger. The suburb is currently designated for small agricultural holdings with approximately 150 plots of land, each approximately 2.2 hectares in size. Little of this land is currently used in farming, apart from one farm which has a resident herd of cattle. Horses may be kept by residents, as well as small livestock such as sheep, chickens and geese.
