= Miss Grand South Africa 2022 =

7th Miss Grand South Africa competition, beauty pageant edition

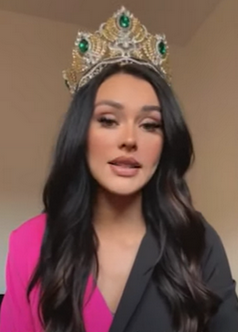
- LuJuan Mzyk, the winner of the contest
- Date: 9 July 2022
- Presenters: Lenie Pieterse
- Venue: The Boesies, Lake Umuzi Waterfront, Secunda
- Broadcaster: YouTube
- Entrants: 38
- Placements: 10
- Winner: Lu Juan Mzyk (Pretoria)

Miss Grand South Africa 2022 was the seventh edition of the Miss Grand South Africa beauty pageant, held on July 9, 2022, at the Boesies hall, Lake Umuzi Waterfront, Secunda. Thirty-eight candidates, who qualified for the national pageant via either an online screening performed or regional workshops performed earlier from February to April, competed for the title, and a 22-year-old fashion media student from Pretoria, Lu Juan Mzyk, was elected the winner, while the Johannesburg representative, Bianca Ramalho, and the Gauteng representative, Sphilangomusa Khwezi Msweli, were named the first and second runners-up, respectively. Lu Juan then represented the country at the Miss Grand International 2022 pageant held in Indonesia on October 25, but was unplaced.

== Result ==
Position	Candidate`
Miss Grand South Africa 2022	Lu Juan Mzyk
1st runner-up	Bianca Ramalho
2ndrunner-up	Sphilangomusa Khwezi Msweli
3rd runner-up	Anita Meyer
4th runner-up	Sharne Dheochand
