= Mountain View, Johannesburg =

Mountain View
- Location within Gauteng Location within South Africa
- Coordinates: 26.168°S 28.082°E
- Country: South Africa
- Province: Gauteng
- Municipality: City of Johannesburg
- Main Place: Johannesburg
- Established: 1902

Area
  - Total: 0.25 km^{2} (0.097 sq mi)

Population (2011)
  - Total: 358
  - Density: 1,400/km^{2} (3,700/sq mi)

Racial makeup (2011)
  - Black African: 48.5%
  - Coloured: 1.9%
  - Indian/Asian: 0.8%
  - White: 46.0%
  - Other: 2.8%

First languages (2011)
  - English: 59.8%
  - Zulu: 17.0%
  - Southern Ndebele: 5.0%
  - Afrikaans: 3.6%
  - Other: 14.5%
- Time zone: UTC+2 (SAST)
- PO box: 2470

Mountain View is a suburb of Johannesburg, South Africa. It is located in Region E of the City of Johannesburg Metropolitan Municipality.

== History ==
The suburb is situated on part of an old Witwatersrand farm called Klipfontein. It was established in 1902 and was named because of it view of the northern Magaliesberg mountains.
