= Gold Reef City =

Amusement park in Johannesburg South

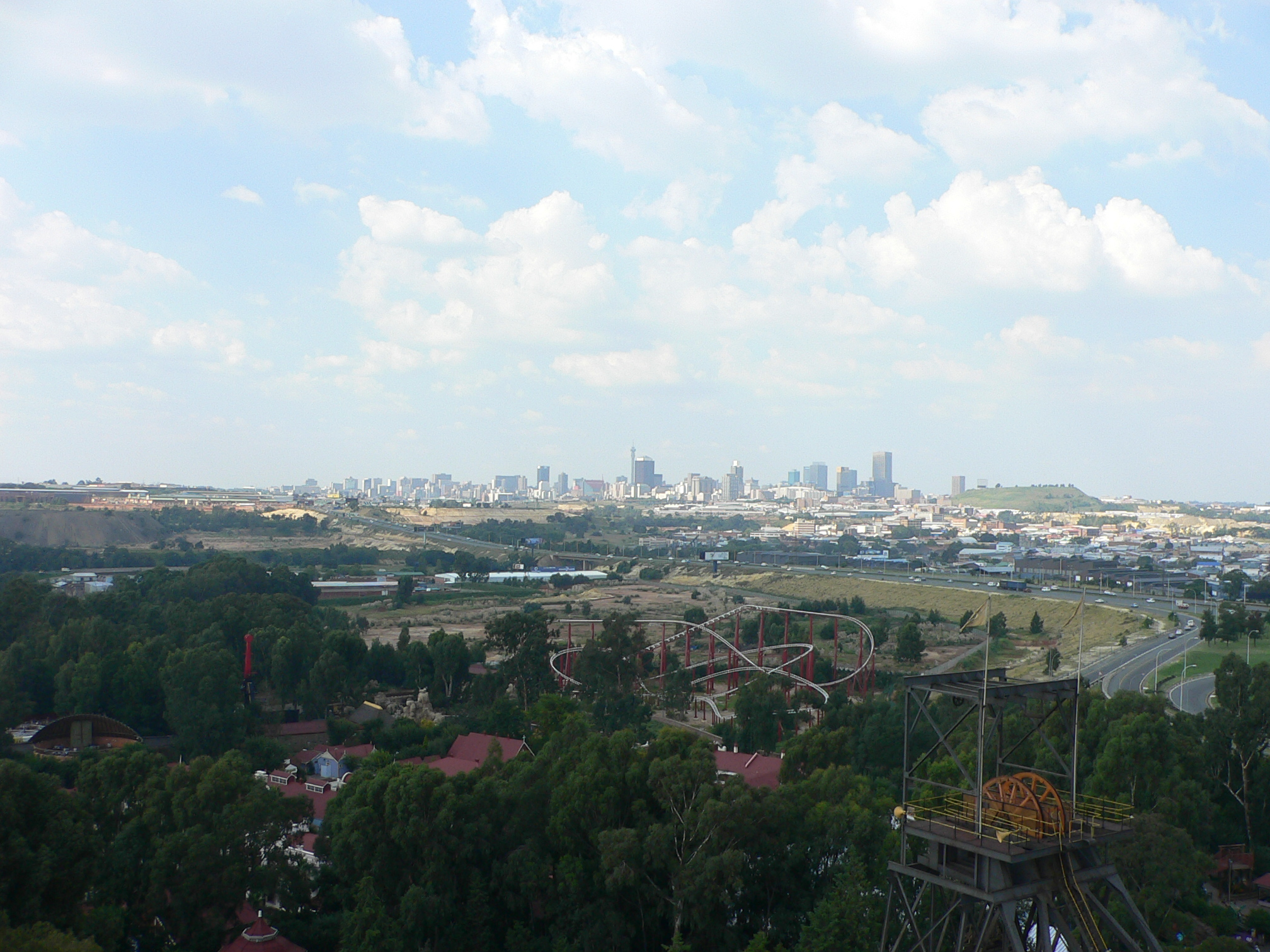
- View from the Giant Wheel to the Jozi Express, with the city in the background
- Interactive map of Gold Reef City
- Location: Johannesburg, South Africa
- Coordinates: 26°14′10″S 28°00′44″E
- Status: Operating
- Opened: 1987
- Owner: Tsogo Sun
- Slogan: Pure Jozi – Pure Gold
- Area: 45 acres (18 ha)

Attractions
- Roller coasters: 6
- Website: www.goldreefcity.co.za

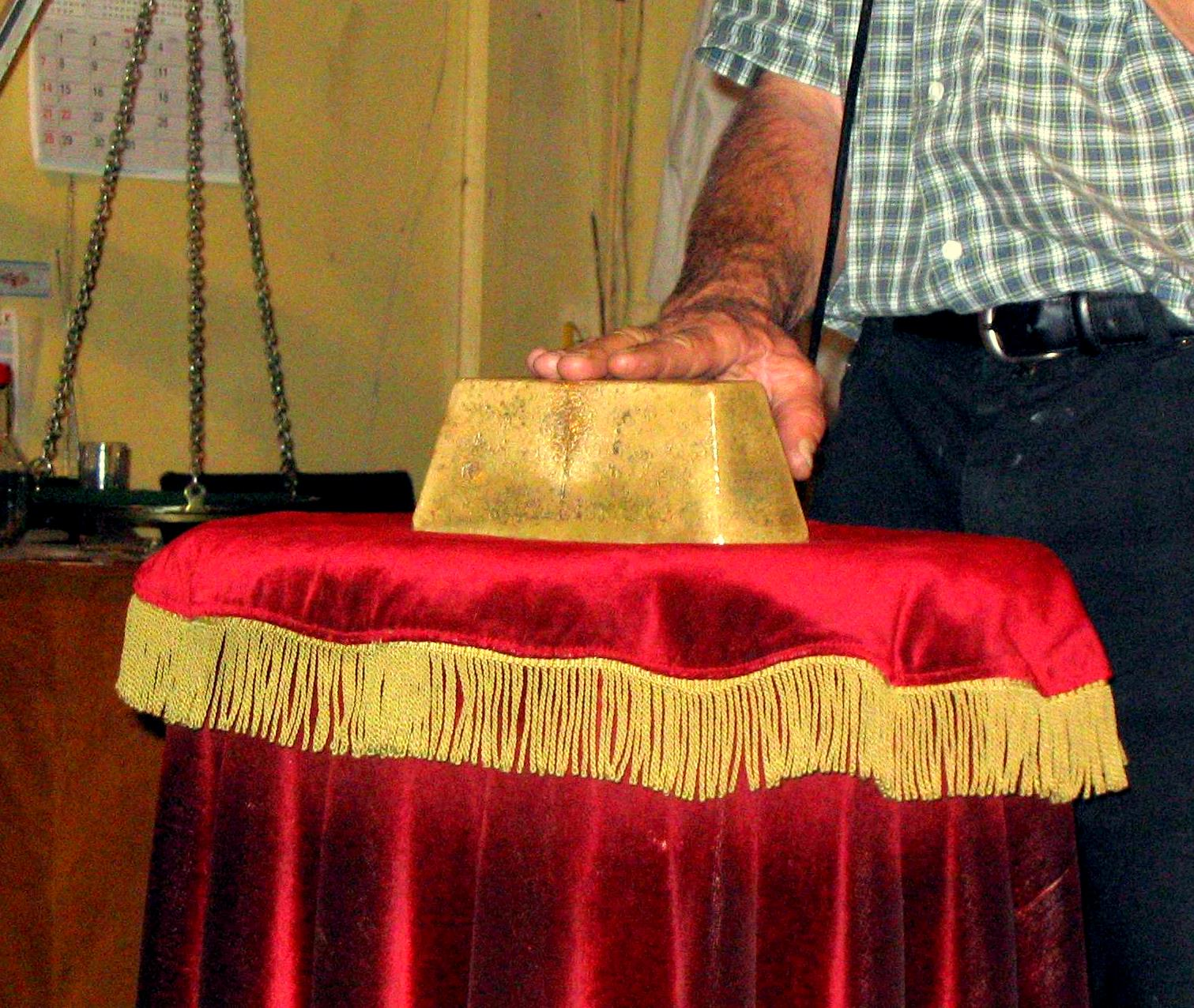
A bar of gold that has just been solidified in Gold Reef City

Gold Reef City is an amusement park in Johannesburg, South Africa. Located on an old gold mine which closed in 1971, the park is themed around the gold rush that started in 1886 on the Witwatersrand, and the buildings in the park are designed to mimic this period. There is a museum dedicated to gold mining on the grounds where it is possible to see a gold-containing ore vein and see how gold is poured into barrels.

There are many attractions at Gold Reef City, including water rides, roller coasters, and the famous Gold Reef City Casino. Gold Reef City is located to the south of Johannesburg's Central Business District off the M1. It is also the site of the Apartheid Museum.

== Rides and attractions ==
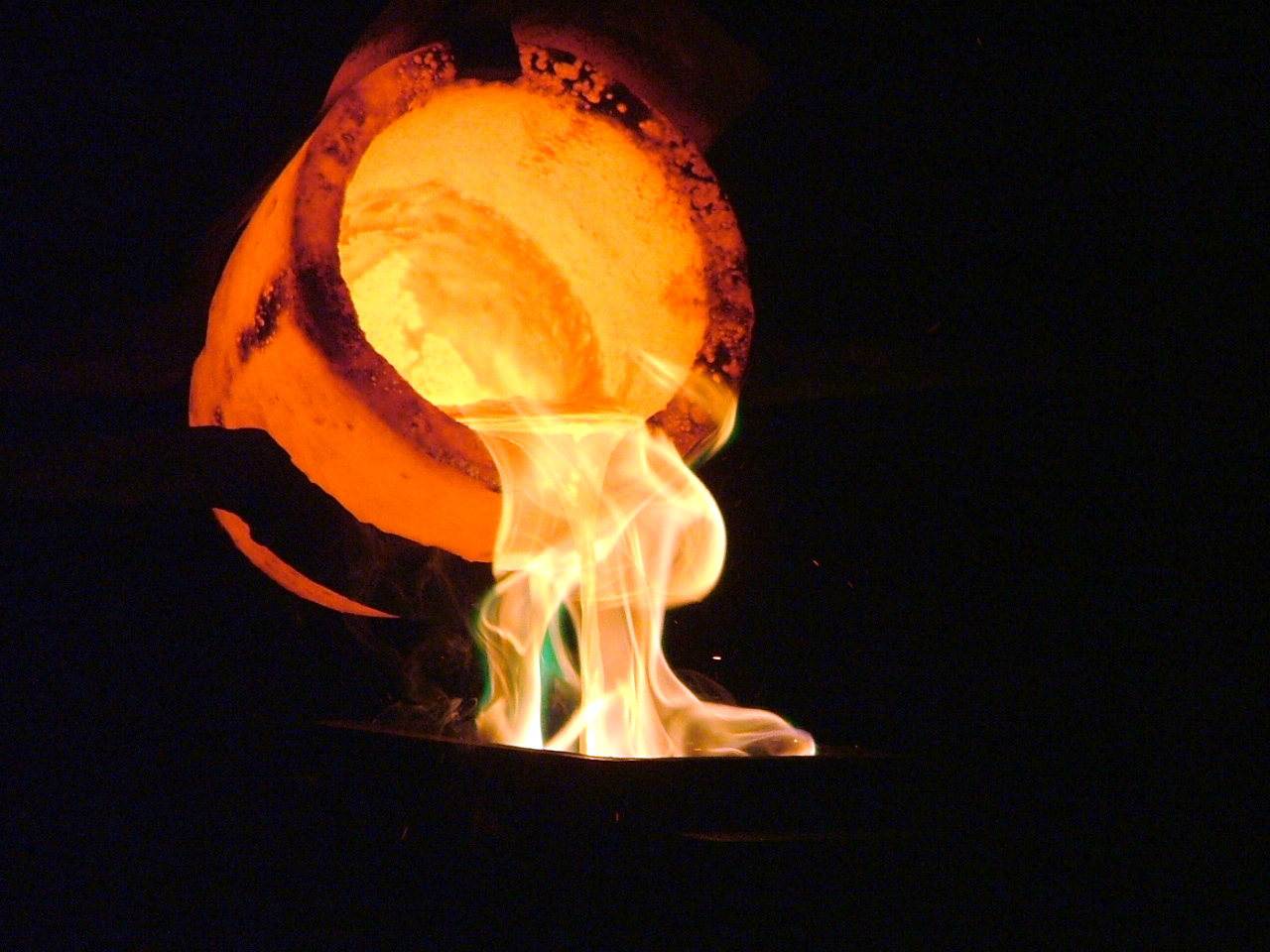
Liquid gold being poured into a cast to make a bullion bar at a Gold Reef City demonstration

Some of the popular rides at the theme park include:

- The Anaconda, the world's only Giovanola inverted coaster.
- Golden Loop, a Schwarzkopf Shuttle Loop coaster. Originally White Lightnin' at Carowinds.
- Jozi Express, a high-speed roller coaster built and manufactured by the German amusement park ride manufacturer Zierer.
- Miner's Revenge
- Raging River Rapids
- Runaway Train
- Storm Chaser
- The High Flying Maverick
- Tower of Terror, a high-speed roller coaster with a vertical drop into an old mineshaft and the highest g-force of any active roller coaster at 6.3 g.
- UFO, a giant wheel that spins at high speed while being lifted from a horizontal position to a near-60-degree position.
- Giant Wheel, a Ferris wheel

== Potential flooding ==
It was reported in 2013 that acidic mine water was slowly rising within the mine on which the park is built and that there was a possibility of the park being flooded if left unattended. Mine tours were temporarily halted, and the museum was moved from 215m underground to 80m aboveground.

== Photo gallery ==
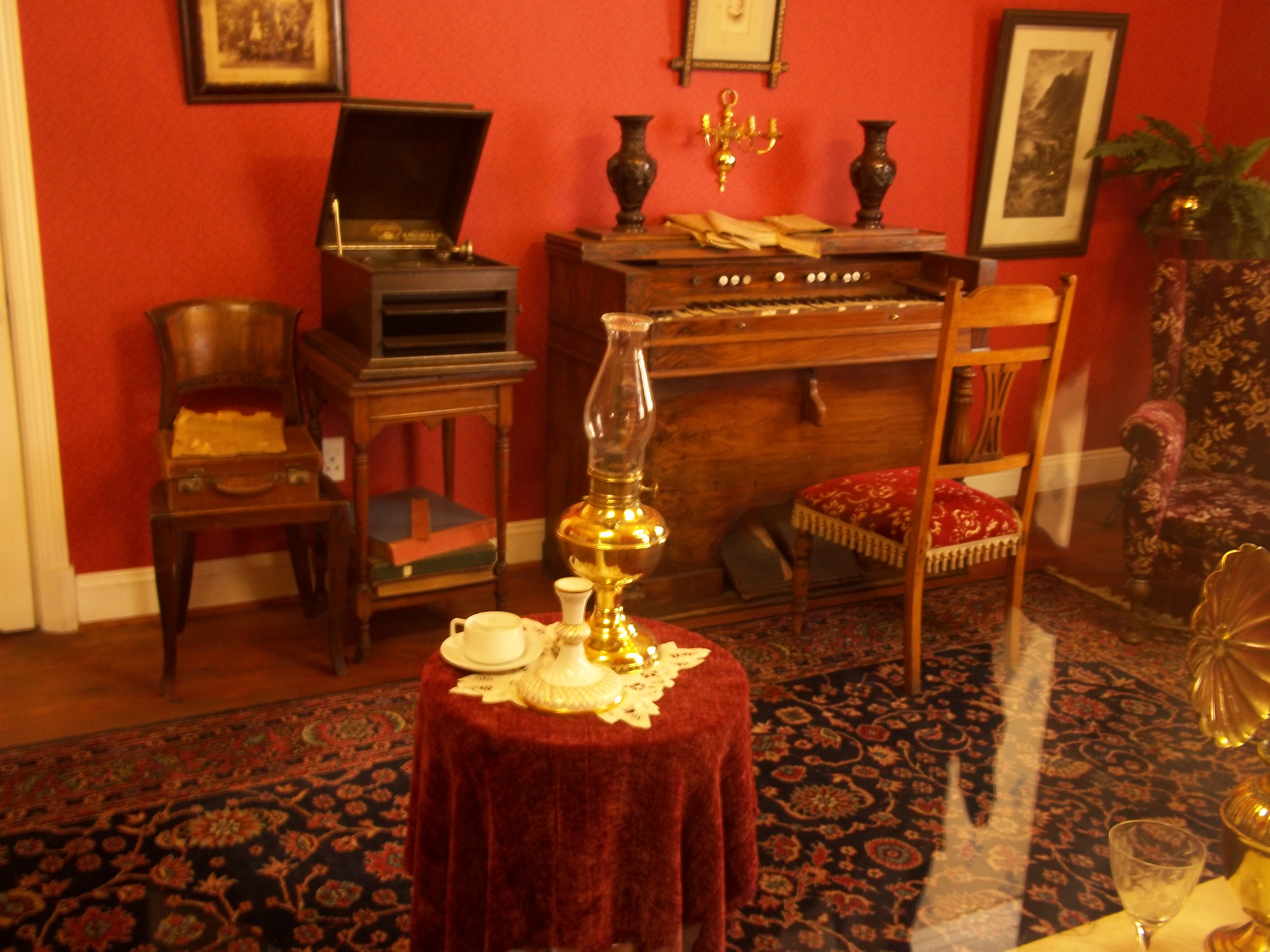
Original mining houses from the early 20th century on display in the park

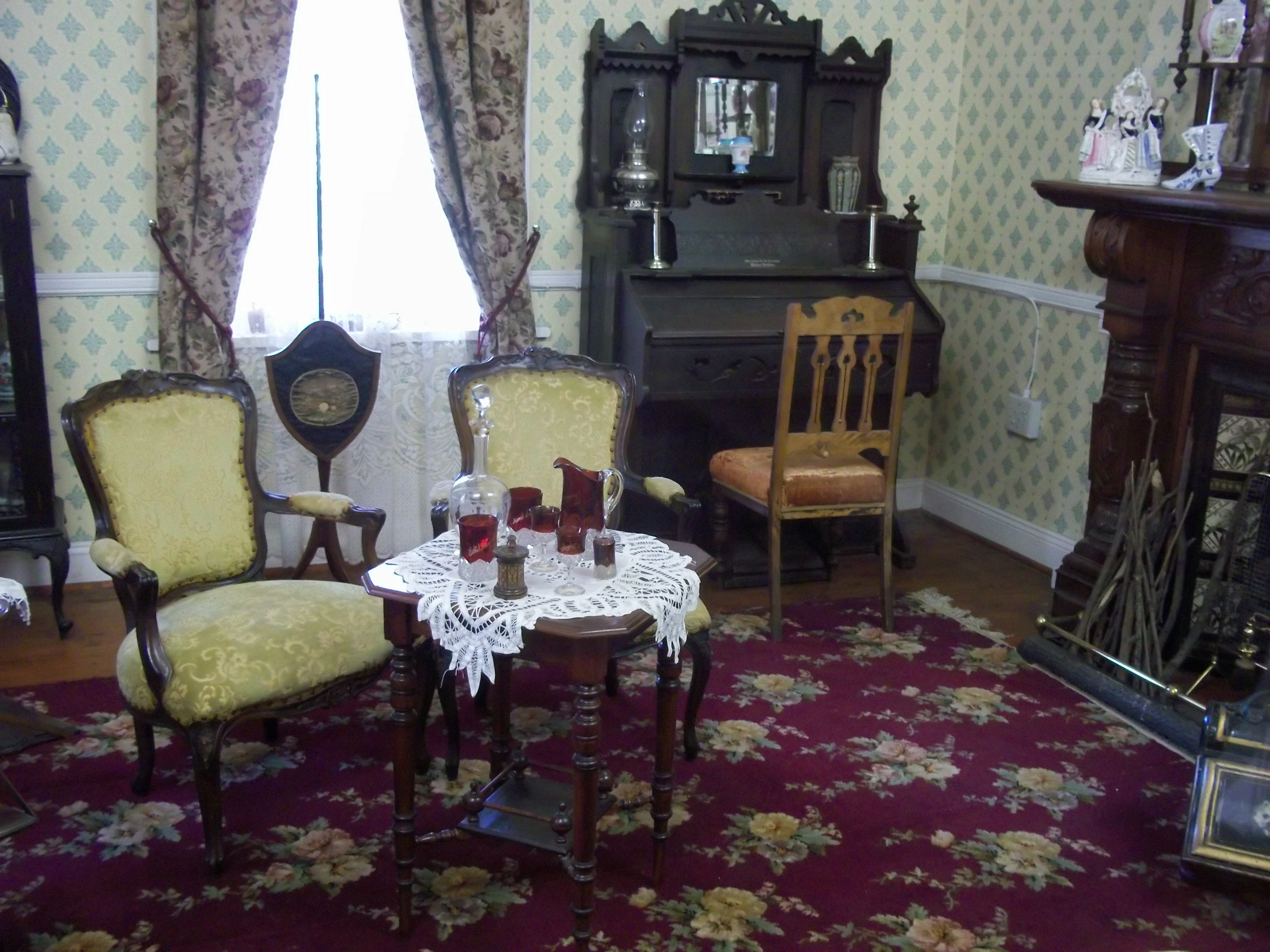
The living room in the mine manager's house

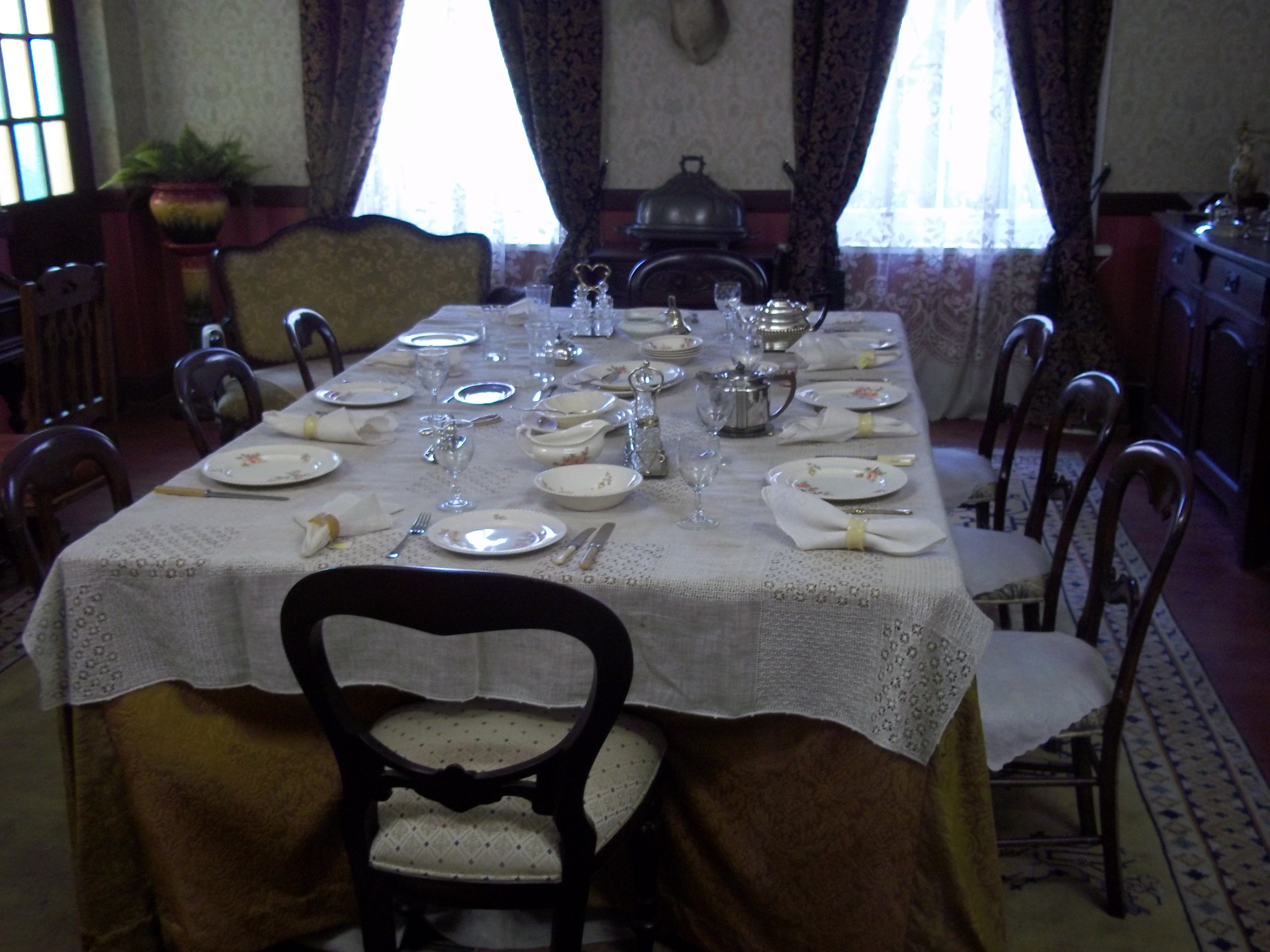
The dining room in the mine manager's house

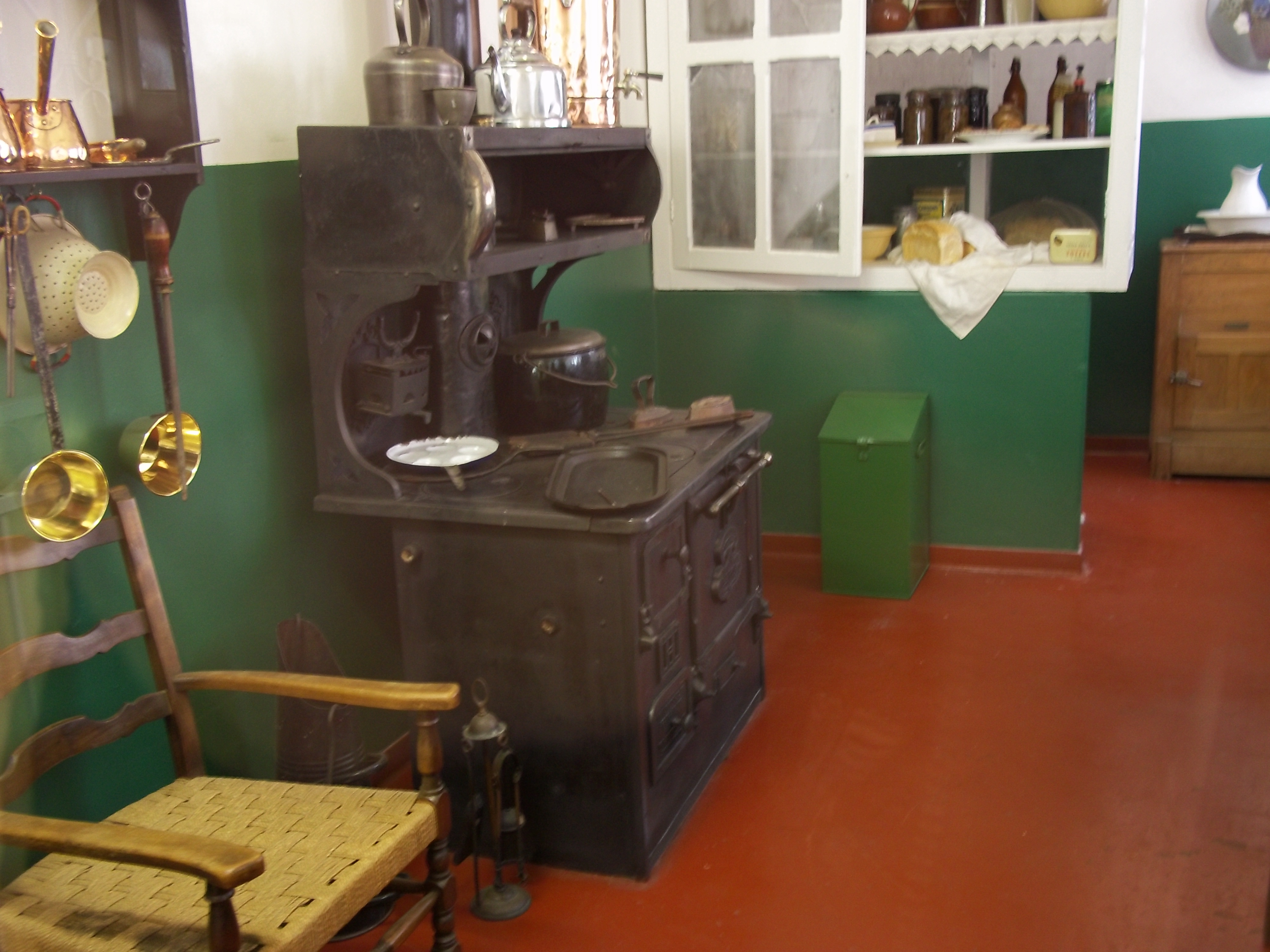
The kitchen in the mine manager's house

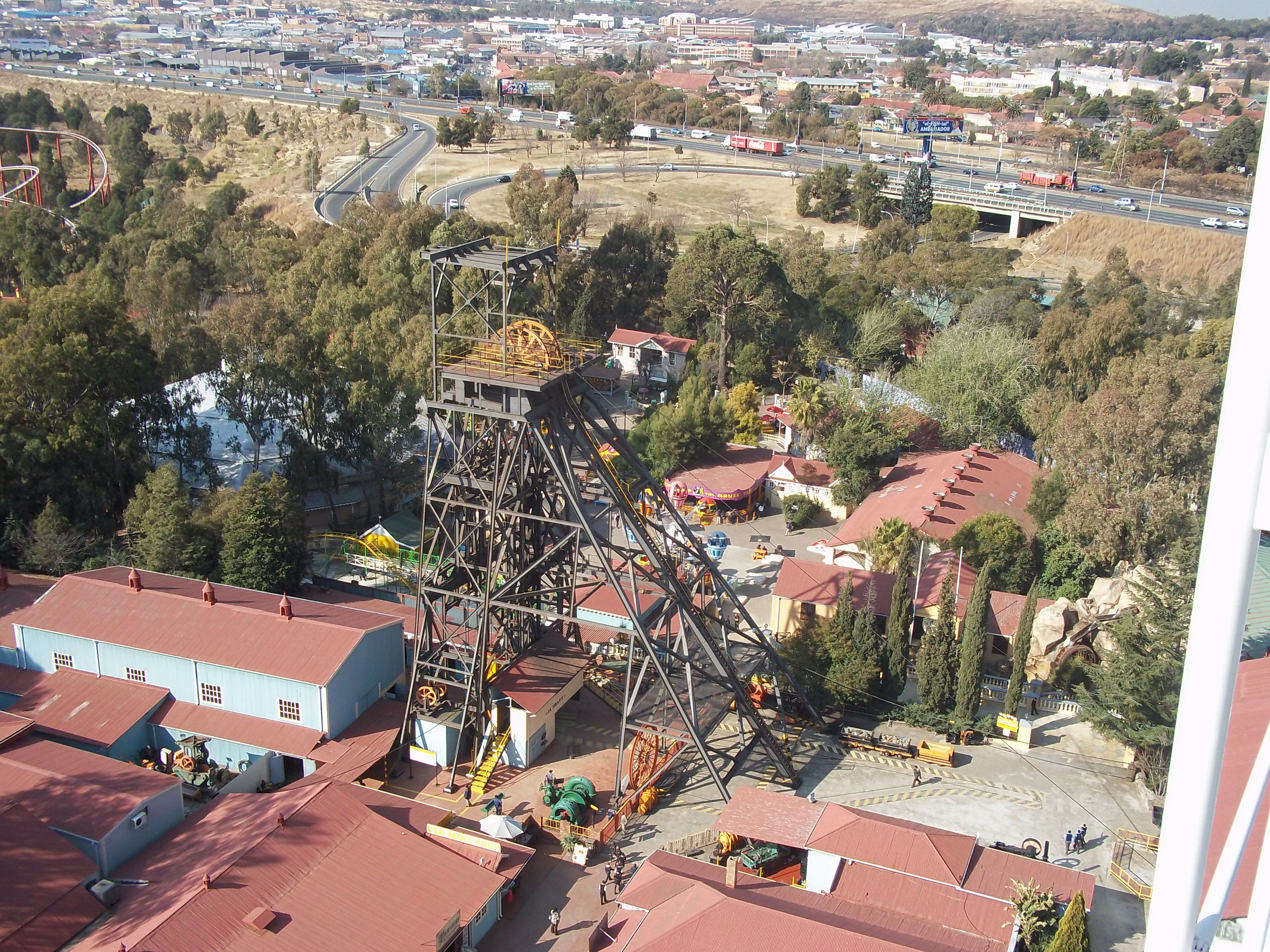
The mine headgear as seen from the Big Wheel

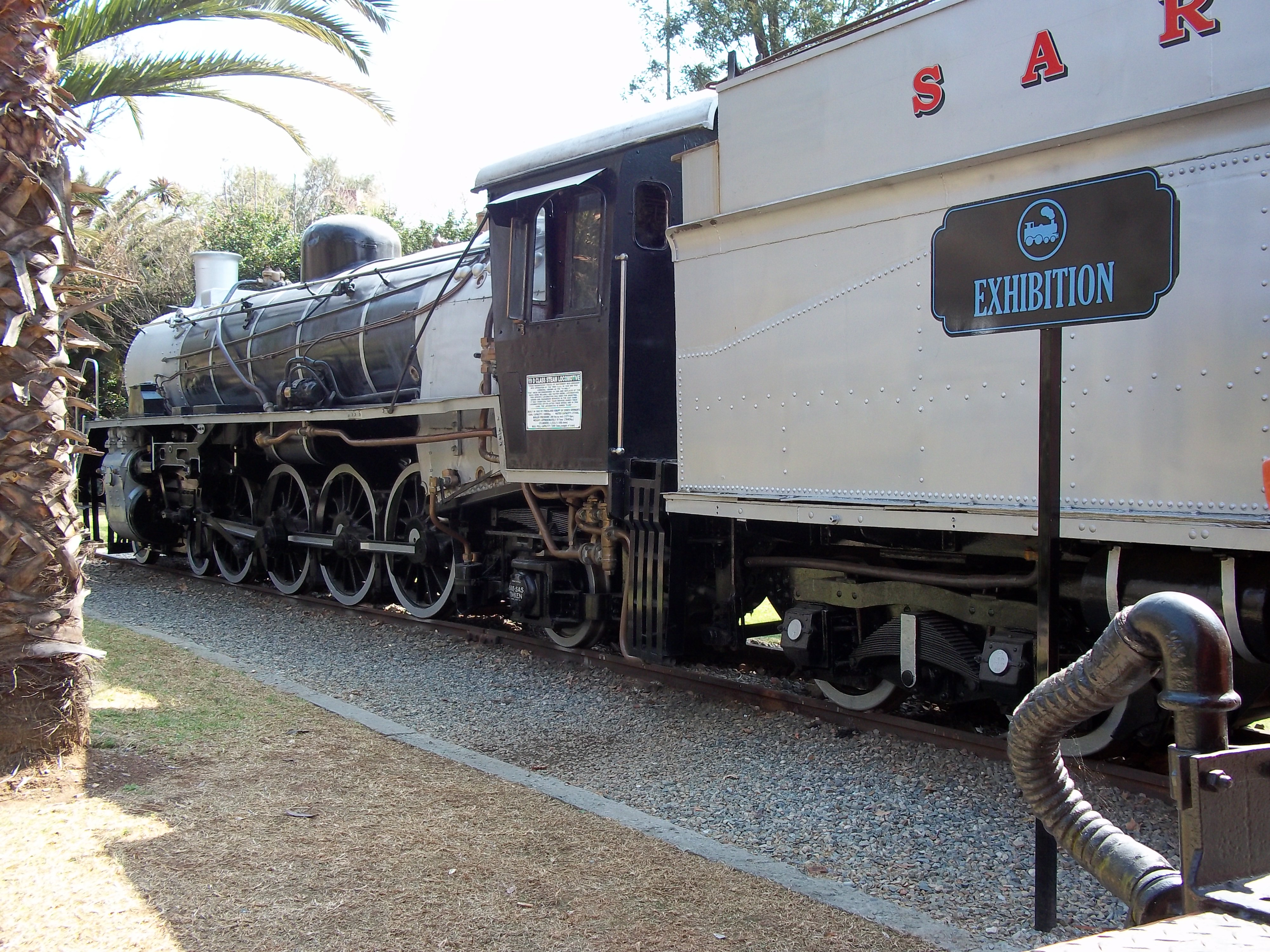
Class 19D steam locomotive on display

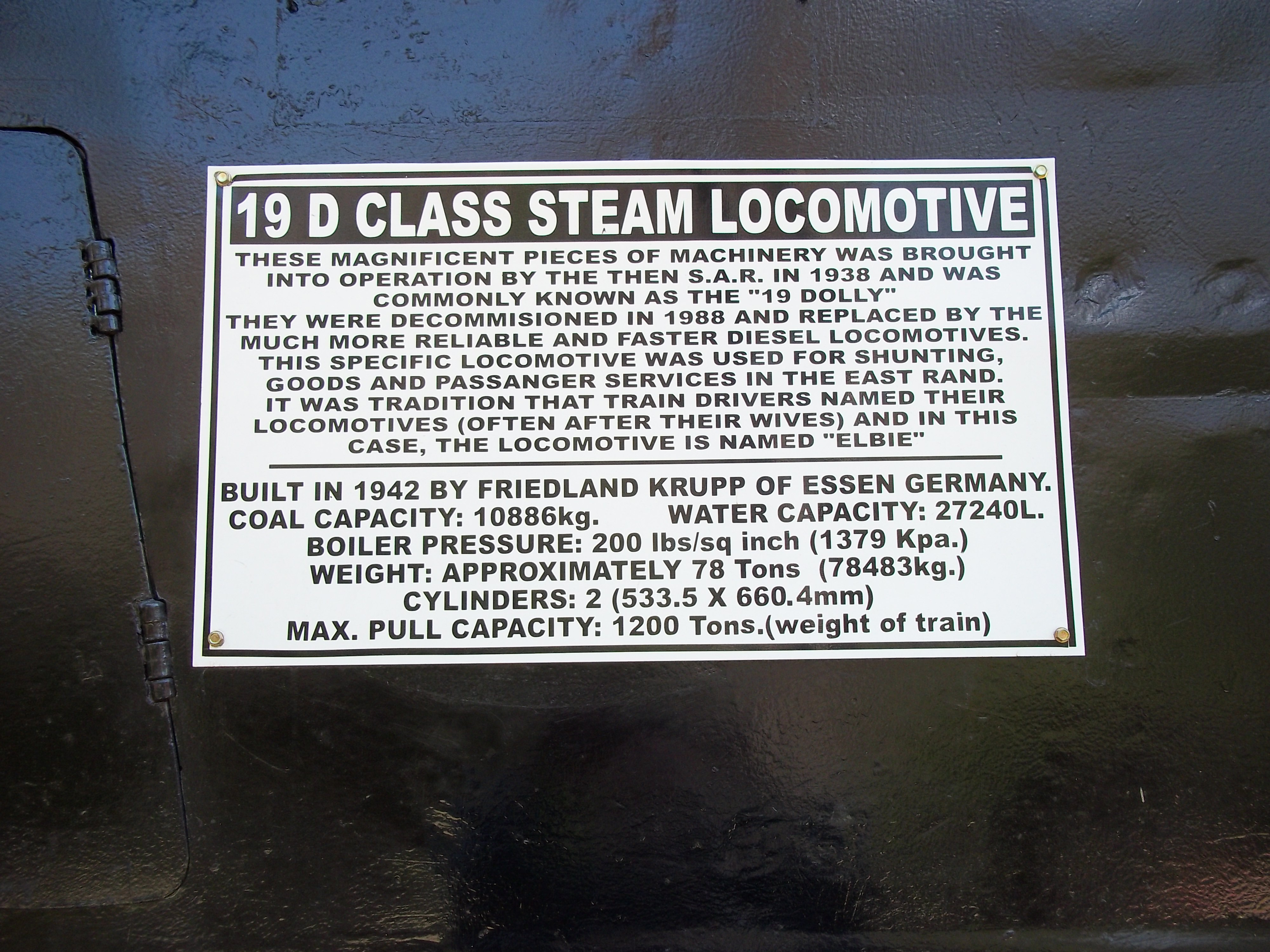
The information board for the Class 19D locomotive on display in the park
