= Miss Hungary =

National Beauty pageant in Hungary

Miss Hungary A Szépségkirálynő
- Formation: 1929
- Type: Beauty pageant
- Headquarters: Budapest
- Location: Hungary
- Official language: Hungarian
- Website: official homepage

Miss Hungary is a national Beauty pageant in Hungary first held in 1929.

== History ==
- 1929 - World War II The first pageant was held in 1929 and the winner of it won the Miss Europe title. In 1936 Zsa Zsa Gabor won the title, but she was underaged so she couldn't compete in Miss Europe. Later she became a Hollywood actress and celebrity and wife of Conrad Hilton.
- From World War II until 1985 the pageant was not held, for political reasons: Hungary was a communist country.
- 1985 The pageant was held again. More than 2,000 contestants vied for the crown, and it was won by a 16-year-old girl, Csilla Molnár. In 1985 she competed in the unofficial Miss Europe pageant when in the preliminaries she was to win, but at the end she came as 2nd runner-up. In the summer of 1986 she committed suicide.
- 1986-1988 Because of Ms Molnar's death the pageant wasn't held.
- 1989 This year was the first when Hungary competed in Miss World.
- 1989-1996 The winner of this pageant was sent to the Miss World (except in 1993, when there wasn't Hungarian contestant). Since 1996 the winner of the Miss World Hungary pageant has been sent to this event.
- 1997 the pageant wasn't held
- since 1998 the event has been held again.

== Titleholders ==
Color key

- Declared as Winner
- Ended as runner-up
- Ended as one of the finalists or semifinalists

Year	Miss Hungary	International	Placement
1929	Böske Simon	Miss Europe 1929	Winner
1930	Mária Papst	Miss Europe 1930	-
1931	Mária Tasnády-Fekete	Miss Europe 1931	-
1932	Ica Lampel	Miss Europe 1932	-
1933	Júlia Gál	Miss Europe 1933	1st Runner-up
1934	Renée Gosztony	Miss Europe 1934	-
1935	Mária Nagy	Miss Europe 1935 & Miss Europe 1936	-
1936	Gábor Sári (Zsa Zsa Gabor)	-	-
1937	Annalia Alejandria		
1938	Anna Zalain (Zalán?)	Miss Europe 1938	-
1985	Csilla Molnár	Unofficial Miss Europe 1986	2nd runner-up
1989	Magdolna Gerlóczy	Miss World 1989	-
1990	Kinga Czuczor	Miss World 1990 and Miss International 1991	-
1991	Orsolya Michna	Miss World 1991	-
1992	Bernadett Papp	Miss World 1992	-
1994	Tímea Farkas	Miss World 1994	-
1995	Ildikó Veinbergen	Miss World 1995	
1998	Leila Sas	-	-
1999	Dammak Jázmin	Queen of the World 2002	2nd runner-up
2000	Melinda Erdélyi	-	-
2001	Szabina Stedra	-	-
2002	Szilvia Tóth	Miss Earth 2002	-
2003	Edina Balogh	-	-
2004	Nóra Nagy	-	-
2005	Noémi Oláh	-	-
2006	Kitti Szabó	-	-
2007	Katalin Koller	-	-
2008	Ildikó Polgár	-	-
2009	Anett Maximovits	-	-
2010	Dóra Gregori	-	-
2011	Marianna Berok	-	-
2012	Henrietta Kelemen	-	-
2013	Brigitta Berecz	-	-
2014	Kinga Kovács	-	-
2015	Beata Kerekes	-	-
2016	Marta Molnar	-	-
2017	Vivien Hettinger	-	-
2018	Ramóna Rusenkó	-	-
2019	Vivien Márki	-	-
2020	Kitti Vascsák	Miss Summer World 2021 and Top Model of The World	Winner at Miss Summer World 2021
2021	Noémi Békési		
2022	Boglárka Horváth		

== See also ==
- Miss Universe Hungary
- Magyarország Szépe
- the Belle of the Anna-ball
