= Dobo =

Dobo may refer to:

- Dobo, a brand name of the drug aminophylline
- Dobo, Indonesia, the main city in the Aru Islands Regency
- Dobo Airport, in Dobo, Indonesia
- Dobo, The Gambia
- Dobo Forest Park, in The Gambia
- Yann Dobo (born 1978), French professional football player

== See also ==
- Dobó, a surname of Hungarian origin
- Dobos (surname)
- Dobos torte, a Hungarian sponge cake
