= Dobó =

Dobó is the name of a Hungarian noble family, and a surname. People with that name include:

- Ágnes Dobó (born 1988), Hungarian model and pageant titleholder
- István Dobó (c. 1502–1572), Hungarian soldier
- Kata Dobó (born 1974), Hungarian actress
- George Devereux (born György Dobó) (1908–1985), Hungarian-French anthropologist

== See also ==
- Dobó István Hungarian Elementary School, Slovakia
- Dobo (disambiguation)
- Dobos (surname)
