= Magyarország Szépe =

Beauty pageant

- Formation: 1989
- Type: Beauty pageant
- Headquarters: Budapest
- Location: Hungary
- Members: Miss World; Miss Earth; Miss Supranational
- Official language: Hungarian
- President: Kata Sarka
- Staff: Magyarorszag Szepe Kft
- Website: Official website

Magyarország Szépe (Miss World Hungary) is a national Beauty pageant for Miss World pageant. The pageant under the management of The Magyarország Szépe Kft. (Beauty of Hungary Ltd.) This pageant is not related to Miss Universe Hungary or Miss International Hungary contests.

== History ==
The first Hungary representative to Miss World under Miss Hungary pageant began in 1985 to 1995. Between 1996 and 2005 the Miss Hungary for Miss World was organized by Mr. Ádám Fásy. Since 2006 the national franchise holder of Miss World in Hungary was taken by Magyarország Szépe Kft. called Beauty of Hungary Ltd. During those years, the winners of A Szépségkirálynő will compete at the Miss World pageant. Since 2015 the pageant named Magyarország Szépe contest the titleholders crowned as Miss World Hungary, Miss Earth Hungary and Top Model of the world Hungary.

== Pageant system ==
The organizers of the pageant accept applications that fulfil the requirements of the Miss World, Miss Universe and Miss Earth pageants. In 2008 and 2009 castings were organized in the headquarters of the RTL Klub TV-channel. The channel was the co-organizer and promoter of the event. About 2000 women applied for the 3 titles, but only 24 were invited to the preparation camp where the contestants were prepared for the final. During preparation a jury decided that 3 of the 24 contestants would be eliminated, and only 21 girls got into the final show which was telecasted live in Hungary.

== Titleholders ==
Color key

- Declared as Winner
- Ended as runner-up
- Ended as one of the finalists or semifinalists

=== Miss World Hungary ===
Year	Magyarország Szépe	Placement	Special Awards
2026	Janka Végvári	Unplaced	
2025	Andrea Katzenbach	Unplaced	
2024	No competition held		
2023	Boglárka Hacsi	Unplaced	
2022	Due to the impact of COVID-19 pandemic, no pageant in 2022		
2021	Lili Tótpeti	Top 40	Miss World Sport (Top 32); Beauty with a Purpose (Top 28)
2020	Due to the impact of COVID-19 pandemic, no pageant in 2020		
2019	Krisztina Nagypál	Unplaced	Miss World Top Model (Top 40)
2018	Andrea Szarvas	Unplaced	Miss World Sport (Top 24)
2017	Virág Koroknyai	Unplaced	Miss World Talent (Top 20)
2016	Tímea Gelencsér	Top 20	Miss World Talent (Top 10); Beauty with a Purpose (Top 24); Miss World Sport (Top 24)
2015	Daniella Kiss	Unplaced	
2014	Edina Kulcsár	1st Runner Up	Miss World Europe
2013	Annamária Rákosi	Unplaced	
2012	Cserháti Tamara	Unplaced	
2011	Linda Szunai	Top 30	
2010	Ágnes Dobó	Unplaced	
2009	Orsolya Serdült	Unplaced	
2008	Szilvia Freire	Unplaced	
2007	Krisztina Bodri	Unplaced	
2006	Renáta Tóth	Unplaced	
2005	Tünde Semmi-Kis	Unplaced	
2004	Veronika Orbán	Unplaced	
2003	Eszter Tóth	Unplaced	
2002	Renáta Rozs	Unplaced	
2001	Zsóka Kapócs	Unplaced	
2000	Judit Kuchta	Unplaced	
1999	Erika Dankai	Unplaced	
1998	Éva Horváth	Unplaced	
1997	Beáta Petes	Unplaced	
1996	Andrea Deák	Unplaced	
1995	Ildikó Veinbergen	Unplaced	
1994	Tímea Farkas	Unplaced	
1992	Bernadett Papp	Unplaced	
1991	Orsolya Michna	Unplaced	
1990	Kinga Czuczor	Unplaced	
1989	Magdolna Gerlóczy	Unplaced	

=== Miss Earth Hungary ===
Magyarország Szépe also sends delegate to the Miss Earth pageant. The official license also manages in under Miss World Hungary Team in Budapest since 2008. Third title of Miss World Hungary may compete at the pageant. Begin in 2015 second place automatically crowns as Miss Earth Hungary.

Year	Magyarország Szépe (Miss Earth)	Placement	Special Awards
2020	Did not compete		
2019	Tünde Blága	Unplaced	
2018	Réka Lukács	Unplaced	
2017	Viktória Viczián	Unplaced	
2016	Eszter Oczella	Unplaced	
2015	Dorina Lepp	Top 16	(bronze); National Costume (Eastern Europe)
2014	Sydney van den Bosch	Unplaced	
2013	Dalma Huszárovics	Unplaced	
2012	Alexandra Kocsis	Did not compete	
2011	Dóra Szabó	Unplaced	
2010	Ágnes Dobó	Did not compete	
2009	Korinna Kocsis	Unplaced	
2008	Krisztina Polgár	Unplaced	

=== Miss Supranational ===
Magyarorszag Szepe also sends delegate to the Miss Supranational pageant. The official license also manages in under Miss World Hungary Team in Budapest since 2010. Runner-up or appoint candidate of Miss World Hungary may compete at the pageant.

Year	Magyarország Szépe (Miss Supranational)	Placement	Special Awards
2020	Due to the impact of COVID-19 pandemic, no pageant in 2020		
2019	Szimonetta Fekszi	Unplaced	
2018	Patricia Galambos	Unplaced	
2017	Did not compete		
2016	Korinna Kocsis	4th Runner-Up	
2015	Valentina Toth	Unplaced	
2014	Ivett Szigligeti	Unplaced	
2013	Anett Szigethy	Unplaced	
2012	Annamaria Rakosi	Unplaced	
2011	Ágnes Konkoly	Top 20	
2010	Zita Zeller	Unplaced	

== Statistics on Miss World ==
As of 2009

Number of pageants	20 (6 as Miss Hungary)
Miss World winner	0
1st runner-up	1
2nd runner-up	0
Finalist	0
Semi-finalist	1
Number of special awards	1

== Crossovers ==
Name	Miss Universe Hungary	Miss World Hungary	Miss Hungary	Miss Balaton	Belle of the Anna-ball
Jazmin Dammak	winner 2008		winner 1999	1st runner-up 2007	
Szilvia Magony				winner 2000	winner 2000
Noémi Oláh		1st runner-up 2006	winner 2005		
Adrienn Bende	winner 2006	1st runner-up 2005			
Anett Maximovits			winner 2009	2nd runner-up 2006	

== See also ==
Other Hungarian beauty pageants are:

- Miss Universe Hungary
- Miss Hungary
- the Belle of the Anna-ball
