= Böske Simon =

1929 Miss Europe winner

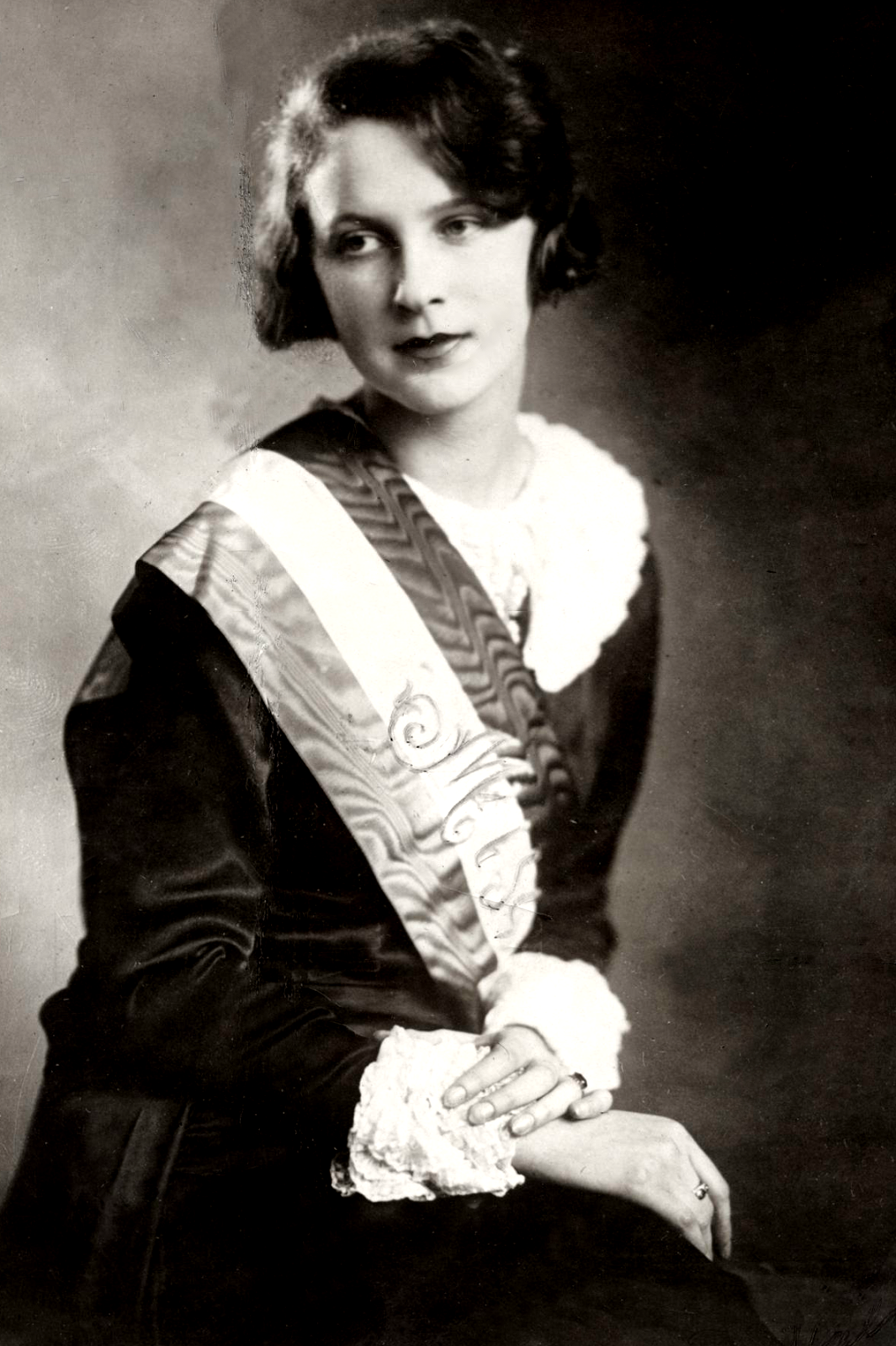
Simon in 1929

Böske Simon (1909–1970) was a Jewish Hungarian beauty queen, the first winner of the title Miss Hungary (1929) and the winner of the Miss Europe 1929 pageant, held in Paris. After her victory in Paris she was received in private audience by the French President, fêted in Vienna on her return journey to Hungary, and greeted at the railway station in Budapest by a crowd of thousands. She was soon, however, subjected to antisemitic attacks and political pressure. On 22 December 1929 she married the textile business heir Pál Brammer, but the couple divorced in 1935. She then married Dániel Jób, artistic director of the Comedy Theatre of Budapest. The couple survived the Second World War in hiding but lived in poverty for the remainder of their lives.
