= Miss Universe Hungary =

National beauty pageant competition in Hungary

Miss Universe Magyarország Organization
- Formation: 1992; 34 years ago
- Purpose: Beauty pageant
- Headquarters: Budapest
- Location: Hungary
- Official language: Hungarian
- Affiliations: Miss Universe
- Website: www.missuniversehungary.org

The Miss Universe Hungary is a national beauty pageant in Hungary for the Miss Universe pageant.

== History ==
The Miss Universe Hungary was held for the first time in 1992. Since that year the owner of the pageant was Mr. Adam Fasy until 2006. From 2007 to 2013 the national franchise holder of Miss Universe in Hungary was taken by Magyarorszag Szepe Kft. called Beauty of Hungary Ltd. During that years, the winner of A Szépségkirálynő will compete in the Miss Universe pageant. Between 2008 and 2013, the Miss Universe Hungary Organization started to choose three equal winners to represent Hungary at Miss Universe, Miss World, and Miss Earth pageants. Since 2014 a company under the management of Andrew G. & Tímea Vajna held the Miss Universe Hungary in the separate procession. Since 2023, the Royal Business Corporation has been the license holder

=== Crown design ===
In 2014, the pageant's national director Tímea Vajna created the official crown. The new crown marks the beginning of a decade-long relationship with the Miss Hungary Organization. Vajna also made the crown for the next Miss Universe Hungary.

=== National directors ===
- Adam Fasy (1992-2013)
- Tímea Vajna and Andrew G. (2014-2016)
- Veronika Kovacs (2018)
- Gábor Panyik (2021)
- Royal Business Corporation (2023―present)

== Titleholders ==
- : Declared as the Winner
- : Finished as a runner-up or top 5/6 qualification
- : Finished as one of the finalists or semifinalists
- : Finished as aspecial awards winner

Year	County	Hometown	Miss Universe Hungary	Placement at Miss Universe	Special Award(s)	Notes
Royal Business Corporation directorship — a franchise holder to Miss Universe from 2023
2026	Fejér	Dunaújváros	Kamilla Kiss	TBA		
2025	Budapest	Budapest	Kincső Dezsényi	Unplaced		
2024	Vas	Szombathely	Nóra Kenéz	Unplaced		
2023	Győr-Moson-Sopron	Hidegség	Tünde Blága	Unplaced		
Gábor Panyik directorship — a franchise holder to Miss Universe in 2021
Did not compete in 2022
2021	Budapest	Budapest	Jázmin Viktória	Unplaced		
Veronika Kovacs directorship — a franchise holder to Miss Universe in 2018
Did not compete between 2019―2020
2018	Budapest	Budapest	Enikő Kecskès	Top 20		
Andrew G. and Timea Vajna directorship — a franchise holder to Miss Universe between 2014―2016
Did not compete in 2017
2016	Budapest	Budapest	Veronika Bodizs	Unplaced		
2015	Borsod-Abaúj-Zemplén	Miskolc	Nikoletta Nagy	Unplaced		
2014	Pest	Albertirsa	Henrietta Kelemen	Unplaced		
Adam Fasy directorship "A Szépségkirályno" — a franchise holder to Miss Universe between 2009―2013
2013	Budapest	Budapest	Rebeka Kárpáti	Unplaced		
2012	Bács-Kiskun	Szeremle	Ágnes Konkoly	Top 10		
2011	Békés	Szarvas	Betta Lipcsei	Unplaced		
2010	Csongrád	Szeged	Tímea Babinyecz	Unplaced		
2009	Budapest	Budapest	Zsuzsa Budai	Unplaced		
Adam Fasy directorship "A Királynő" — a franchise holder to Miss Universe in 2008
2008	Budapest	Budapest	Jázmin Dammak	Top 15		
Adam Fasy directorship (Magyarorszag Szepe Kft.) — a franchise holder to Miss Universe between 1992―2007
2007	Somogy	Kaposvár	Ildikó Bóna	Unplaced		
2006	Budapest	Budapest	Adrienn Bende	Top 20		
2005	Somogy	Siófok	Szandra Proksa	Unplaced		
2004	Szabolcs-Szatmár-Bereg	Ibrány	Blanka Bakos	Unplaced		
2003	Somogy	—	Viktória Tomozi	Unplaced		
2002	Budapest	Budapest	Edit Friedl	Unplaced		
2001	—	—	Ágnes Helbert	Unplaced		
2000	Budapest	Budapest	Izabella Kiss	Unplaced		
2000	Budapest	Budapest	Ágnes Nagy	Did not compete		Withdrew — for personal reasons — Note: The name of Miss Universe Hungary in 1998 and 2000 had the same name but different persons. Izabella, a runner-up took over to compete at Miss Universe 2000.
1999	Bács-Kiskun	Soltvadkert	Anett Garami	Unplaced		
1998	Budapest	Budapest	Ágnes Nagy	Unplaced		
1997	Hajdú-Bihar	Debrecen	Ildikó Kekan	Unplaced		
1996	Budapest	Budapest	Andrea Deák	Unplaced		
1995	Győr-Moson-Sopron	Győr	Andrea Harsányi	Unplaced		
1994	Jász-Nagykun-Szolnok	Karcag	Szilvia Fórián	Unplaced		
1993	Veszprém	Balatonfüred	Zsanna Pardy	Unplaced		
1992	Heves	Eger	Dóra Patkó	Unplaced		

=== Statistics ===
Number of pageants	25
Miss Universe winner	0
1st runner-up	0
2nd runner-up	0
Finalist	0
Semi-finalist	4
Number of special awards	0

== See also ==
other Hungarian beauty pageants are

- Magyarország Szépe
- Miss International Hungary
- Miss Hungary
- Belle of the Anna-ball

== Notes ==
- Ildikó Bóna competed at the Miss Intercontinental 2008 and placed as Top 15.
- Jázmin Dammak previously crowned as Miss Hungary 1999 and placed as 2nd Princess of Queen of the World 2002 contest.
- Ágnes Konkoly previously represented Hungary at the Miss Supranational 2011 and placed as Top 20 Semi-finalist.
- Henrietta Kelemen previously crowned as Miss Hungary in 2012.
