= Janka Végvári =

Hungarian beauty pageant titleholder

- Born: 4 October 2007 (age 19); Mosonmagyaróvár, Hungary
- Education: Kossuth Lajos High School
- Occupations: Model; student
- Beauty pageant titleholder
- Title: Miss World Hungary 2025
- Major competitions: Miss World Hungary 2025; (Winner); Miss World 2026; (Unplaced)

Janka Végvári (born 4 October 2007) is a Hungarian beauty pageant titleholder and model who was crowned Miss World Hungary 2025. At 17 years old, she became the youngest contestant in history to earn the title, going on to represent Hungary at Miss World 2026 in Vietnam.

== Early life and education ==
Végvári was born on 4 October 2007 and was raised in Mosonmagyaróvár, Győr–Moson–Sopron County, northwestern Hungary. She attended the Kossuth Lajos High School in Mosonmagyaróvár, specializing in an advanced English language program.

Following her national pageant victory, she relocated to Budapest to pursue her career opportunities in modeling and charitable work. To balance her public duties and competition preparation with her studies, she transitioned to private schooling and completed her secondary school graduation exams (érettségi) in mid-2026.

== Pageantry ==
=== Miss World Hungary 2025 ===
On 22 June 2025, Végvári competed alongside 15 other finalists in the Magyarország Szépe (Miss World Hungary) national finale, broadcast live on public television station Duna. During the pre-pageant training camp, she won the Miss Charity fast-track category for her community advocacy project.

At the conclusion of the event, 17-year-old Végvári was awarded the highest score by the 21-member jury panel and was crowned Miss World Hungary 2025 by outgoing titleholder Andrea Katzenbach. She also served as an ambassador for the Miss Spinner Motivational Foundation.

=== Miss World 2026 ===
As the winner of Miss World Hungary 2025, Végvári earned the right to represent Hungary at the 73rd edition of Miss World 2026 in Vietnam.

== Philanthropy and public image ==
Végvári has been actively involved in charitable activities in her home city of Mosonmagyaróvár and nationally across Hungary. Following her crowning, she began collaborating on initiatives with UNICEF Hungary and participated in charitable sports and youth social impact projects.

Awards and achievements
Preceded by Andrea Katzenbach	Miss World Hungary; 2025	Incumbent
