= Miss International Hungary =

National beauty pageant

- Formation: 1991
- Type: Beauty pageant
- Headquarters: Budapest
- Location: Hungary
- Members: Miss International
- Official language: Hungarian
- Organizers: Tamas Czegledi; Dr. Szabolcs Gall; Gabor Szilagyi
- Website: Official website

Miss International Hungary is a national beauty contest for Miss International pageant.

== History ==
On August 12, 2011 Miss International Hungary pageant began, and crowned the first titleholder, Nóra Virágh. It was run under organizers Tamas Czegledi, Dr. Szabolcs Gall and Gabor Szilagyi. The winner of Miss International Hungary was expected to be the Ambassador of Peace and Beauty of Hungary. Between 1991 and 2004, Hungarian delegates were appointed by Mr. Adam Fasy Management. Blanka Bakos is the last representative from that organization.

On December 17, 2013 Brigitta Ötvös was the first titleholder who placed in Top 5 of the Miss International 2013 pageant. This is the highest placement result in beauty pageant history for Hungary.

In addition to the main title, from 2014 to 2017, the Hungarian representatives for the Miss Grand International pageant were also determined through the Miss International Hungary contest.

On May 16, 2015 Linda Szunai was appointed as Miss International Hungary by the Miss International Hungary Team.

This pageant is not related to Miss Universe Hungary or Miss World Hungary contests.

The 5th annual Miss International Hungary pageant was postponed for two months after Linda Szunai was appointed as Miss International Hungary 2015. The reigning title Miss International in fifth edition automatically competed in the 2016 Miss International beauty pageant.

== Titleholders ==
Color key

- Declared as winner
- Ended as runner-up
- Ended as one of the finalists or semifinalists

Year	Miss Hungary	Placement	Special Awards
2018	Frida Maczkó	Unplaced	
2017	Rebeka Hartó	Unplaced	
2016	Csillag Szabó	Unplaced	
2015	Linda Szunai	Unplaced	
2014	Dalma Karman	Unplaced	
2013	Brigitta Ötvös	3rd Runner-up	
2012	Claudia Kozma	Unplaced	
2011	Nóra Virágh	Unplaced	
2004	Blanka Bakos	Unplaced	
1991	Kinga Czuczor	Unplaced	
