= Juncal Rivero =

Spanish model actress and beauty pageant winner (born 1966)

Juncal Rivero (born 31 August 1966) is a Spanish model and actress. She was Miss Spain 1985 and Miss Europe for 1985–1988, and was also a contestant in the Miss World 1984 pageant.

Awards and achievements
Preceded by (Turkey) Neşe Erberk	Miss Europe; 1985	Succeeded by (Italy) Michela Rocco di Torrepadula
Preceded by Garbiñe Abásolo García	Miss Europe Spain; 1985	Succeeded by Ana Jesús Rebollos Fernández
Preceded by Garbiñe Abasolo	Miss Spain; 1984	Succeeded by (Valencian Community) Amparo Martínez Cerdán
Preceded by (Province of Las Palmas) Milagros Pérez Castro	Miss World Spain; 1984	Succeeded by (Valencian Community) Maria Amparo Martínez
