= Dobos (surname) =

Dobos is a Hungarian surname meaning drummer. Notable people with the surname include:

- Attila Dobos (born 1978), Hungarian footballer
- Gábor Dobos (born 1976), Hungarian sprinter
- Julius Dobos (born 1976), Hungarian composer and music producer
- Krisztina Dobos (1949–2013), Hungarian educator, economist and politician

== See also ==
- Dobo (disambiguation)
- Dobó, a Hungarian surname
