= Csilla Molnár =

Hungarian model and beauty queen

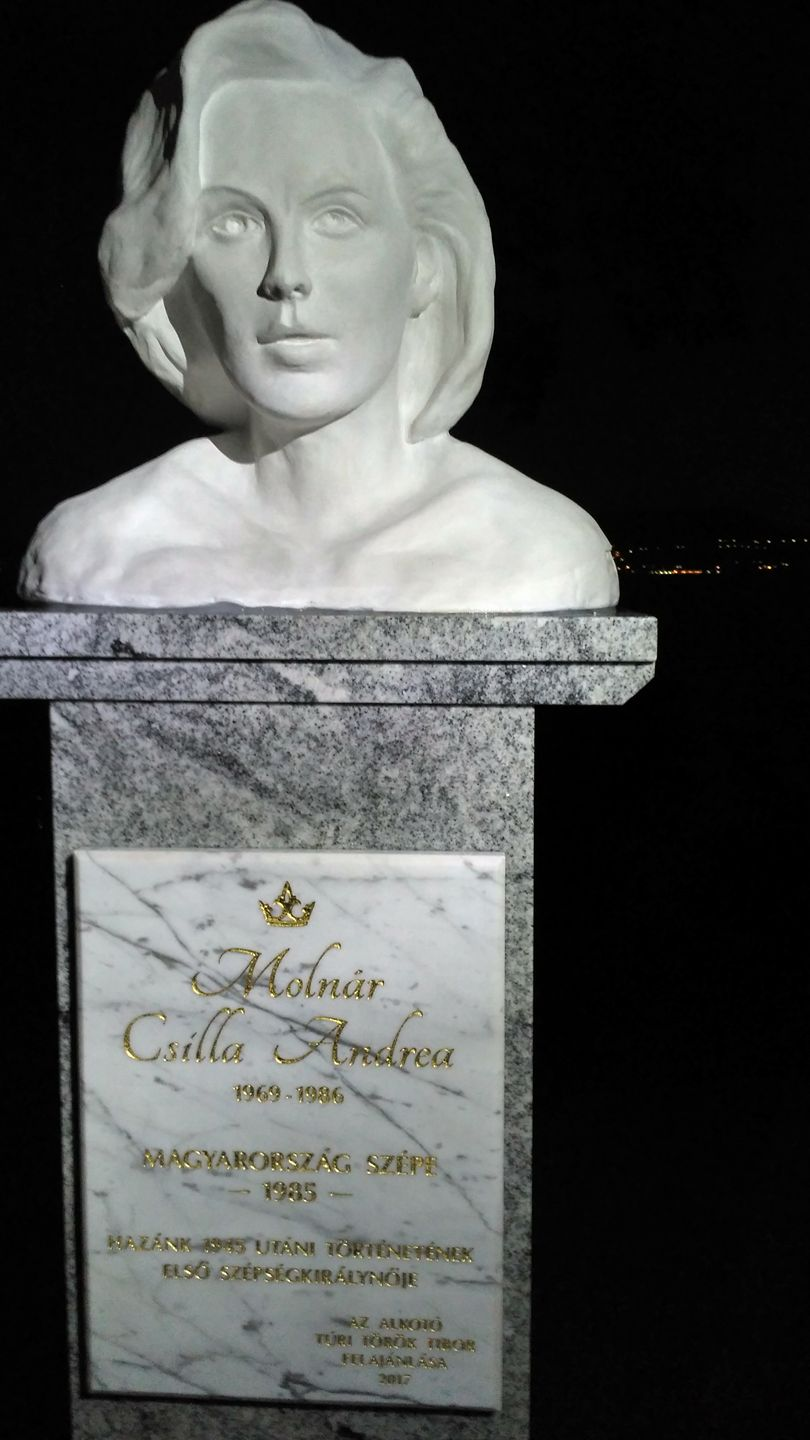
- Born: Csilla Andrea Molnár; 20 January 1969; Kaposvár, Hungary
- Died: 10 July 1986 (aged 17); Fonyód, Hungary
- Occupation: Fashion model
- Years active: 1983–1986
- Modeling information
- Height: 5 ft 10 in (178 cm)
- Hair color: Brown
- Eye color: Brown

Csilla Andrea Molnár (20 January 1969 – 10 July 1986) was a Hungarian beauty queen. She was crowned Miss Hungary on 5 October 1985, in Budapest, the first Hungarian beauty queen after a 50-year interval. She also entered for the Miss Europa 1986 beauty contest in Valletta, Malta, where she came in third place.

== Suicide ==
She committed suicide on 10 July 1986 by overdosing on lidocaine. In a radio interview, shortly before her death, she complained of being harassed by the public saying: "I don't know whether I can bear this, everybody is harassing me. They ask: Where and from whom did you get those beautiful clothes? Who helped you? Do you or your father have special connections with the jury? And so on".

She was the subject of a 1987 book Isten óvd a királynőt! – a felszabadulás utáni első – eddig egyetlen – magyar szépségkirálynő, Molnár Csilla Andrea életének és halálának hiteles dokumentumai ("God Save the Queen! – the first authentic documentary on the life and death of Csilla Andrea Molnár, the first – and so far only – Hungarian beauty queen after the liberation") by Sándor Friderikusz (HP Hungaroprop Kulturális Kiadó, ISBN 9789635006267).

The 1987 film Szépleányok (Pretty Girls), directed by András Dér and László Hartai, explored the story of the beauty contest and Molnar's death.

Her life and death continue to be a source of interest in modern Hungarian news media.

On 20 January 2019, several Hungarian newspapers reviewed her biography on what would have been her 50th birthday.

== Bibliography ==
- Sándor Friderikusz [in Hungarian] (1987). God, Protect the Queen!. HP Hungaroprop Kulturális Kiadó. ISBN 9789635006267.
