= Rebeka Kárpáti =

Hungarian model (born 1994)

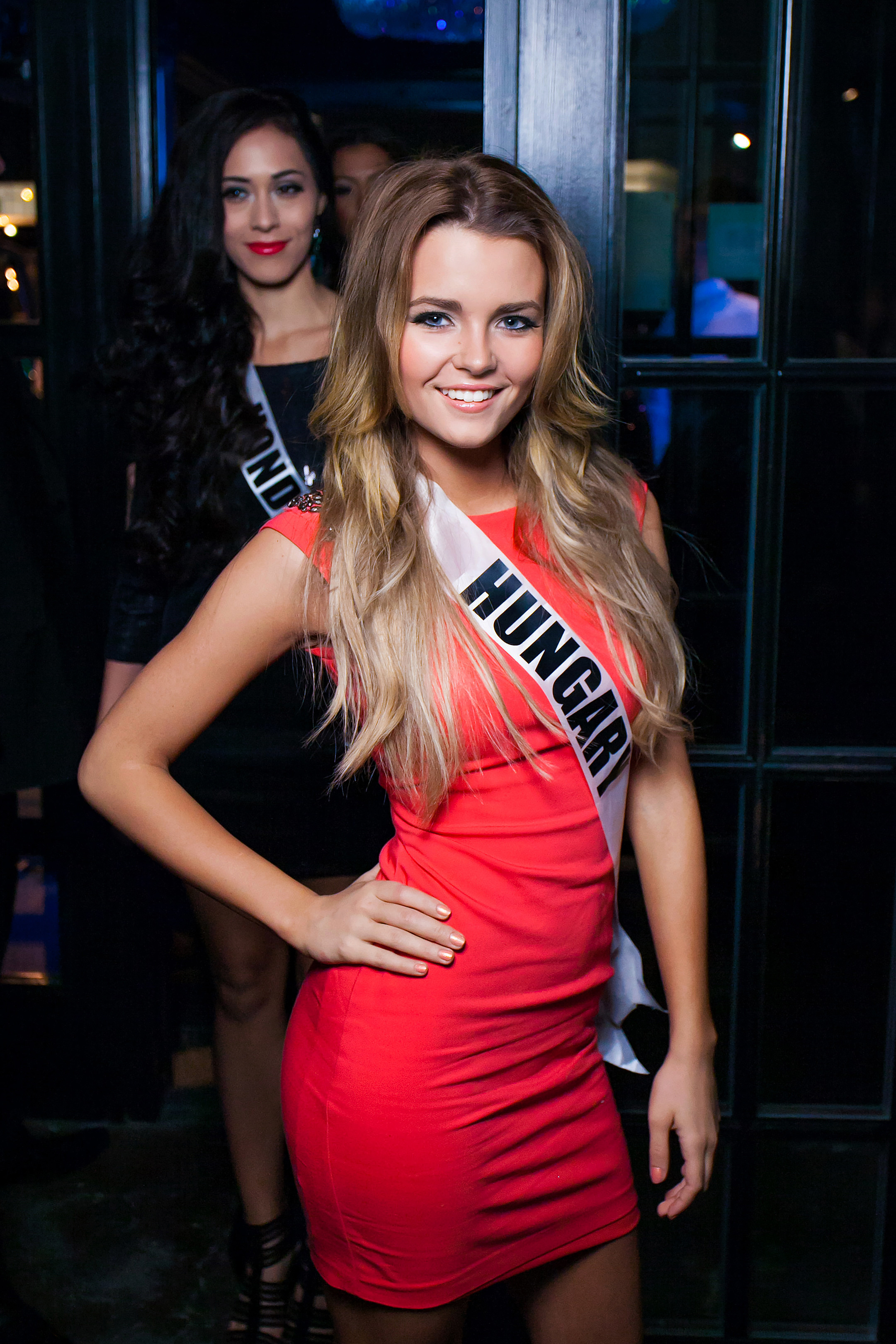
- Born: Rebeka Kárpáti; 9 October 1994 (age 32); Budapest, Hungary
- Height: 1.73 m (5 ft 8 in)
- Beauty pageant titleholder
- Title: Miss Universe Hungary 2013
- Hair color: Blonde
- Eye color: Brown
- Major competitions: Miss Universe Hungary 2013 (Winner); Miss Universe 2013 (Unplaced)

Rebeka Kárpáti (born 9 October 1994) is a Hungarian model and beauty pageant titleholder who was crowned Miss Universe Hungary 2013 and represented her country at the Miss Universe 2013 pageant.

== Early life ==
Kárpáti's parents are actors: her father, Péter R. Kárpáti, is well known from the Hungarian soap opera Barátok közt. She has a younger brother, András.

== A Szépségkirálynő 2013 ==
A Szépségkirálynő 2013 was held at the TV2 studios in Budapest on 21 June 2013. Rebeka Kárpáti was crowned Miss Hungary 2013 (Miss Universe Hungary 2013) and competed at the Miss Universe 2013, in Moscow, Russia.

Awards and achievements
Preceded by Ágnes Konkoly	Miss Universe Hungary; 2013	Succeeded by Henrietta Kalemen
