= Miss Grand Hungary =

Beauty pageant in Hungary

- Formation: 2013
- Type: Beauty pageant
- Headquarters: Budapest
- Location: Hungary
- Members: Miss Grand International
- Official language: Hungarian
- National director: Szonja Dudik (2025)
- Parent organization: Sonia Stuido (2025); Miss International Hungary (2014 – 2017)

Miss Grand Hungary is a national beauty pageant title awarded to Hungarian representatives competing at the Miss Grand International pageant. The title was first introduced in 2013, when the winner of Miss Év Arca 2011, Eszter Tüzes, was nominated to compete in the inaugural edition of Miss Grand International in Thailand. In 2014, the license was then taken over by a preliminary contest for Miss International in Hungary, Miss International Hungary, where Miss Grand Hungary was considered the supplementary title.

After the dissolution of the Miss International Hungary in 2017, there has been no Miss Grand International license holder in Hungary ever since.

== History ==
Hungaria debuted in the Miss Grand International in 2013, but its representative, Eszter Tüzes, a Romanian-Hungarian from Târgu Mureș who was the winner of the Face of the Year 2011 contest (Év Arca szépségversenyt), but she did not get any placements in the competition. The license was then transferred to Miss International Hungary, a 2011-established national pageant based in the capital, where the Hungary representatives for Miss Grand International were selected as the supplementary title at such a national contest.

The Miss International Hungary pageant ended its partnership with Miss Grand International in 2018, as its 2018 pageant only crowned the representative for the Miss International, and no appointed candidate for the Miss Grand International has been observed; there has been no Miss Grand International license holder in Hungary ever since. The Miss International Hungary contest was later dissolved the following year.

Gallery

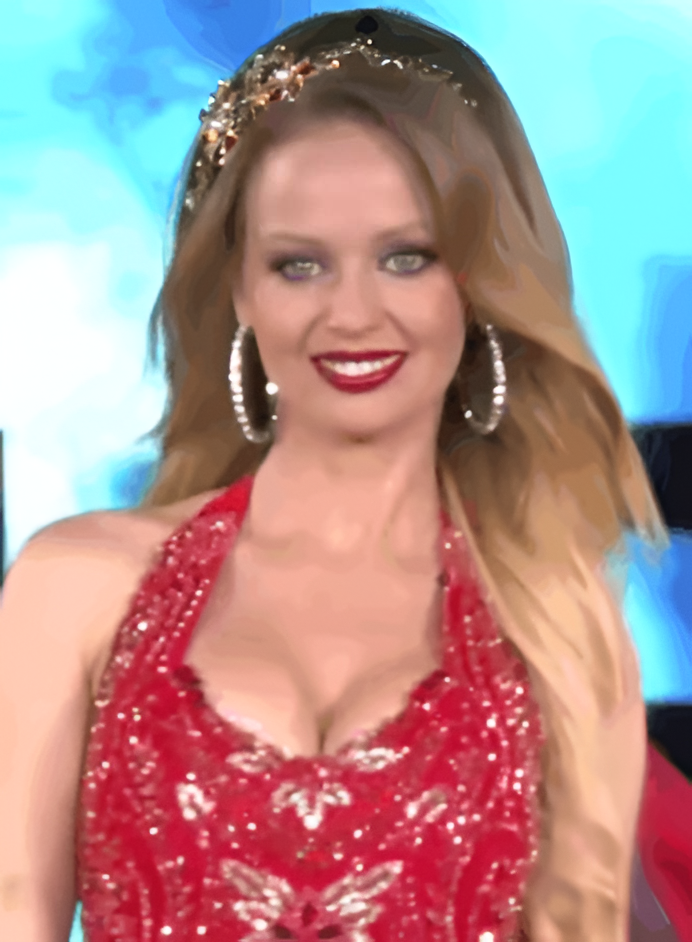
Szonja Dudik
Miss Grand Hungary 2025

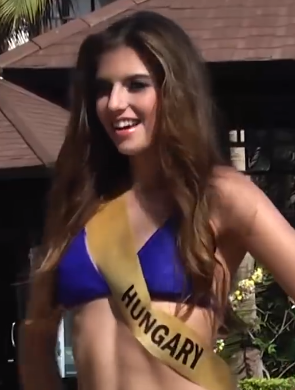
Szabó Csillag
Miss Grand Hungary 2015

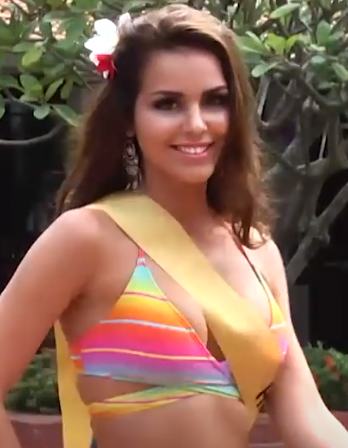
Lukács Réka
Miss Grand Hungary 2014

== International competition ==
The following is a list of Hungarian representatives at the Miss Grand International contest.

Year	Representative	Original national title	International result		National director(s)
Year	Representative	Original national title	Placement	Other awards	National director(s)
2013	Eszter Tüzes	Miss Év Arca 2011	Unplaced	—	Tamas Czegledi, Szabolcs Gall, and Gabor Szilagyi
2014	Lukács Réka	Miss Grand Hungary 2014	Unplaced	—	Tamas Czegledi, Szabolcs Gall, and Gabor Szilagyi
2015	Dalma Nyitrai	Miss Face of Beauty Hungary 2014	Resigned		Tamas Czegledi, Szabolcs Gall, and Gabor Szilagyi
2015	Szabó Csillag	Miss International Hungary 2016	Unplaced	—	Tamas Czegledi, Szabolcs Gall, and Gabor Szilagyi
2016	Váradi Anna	Miss Grand Hungary 2016	Unplaced	—	Tamas Czegledi, Szabolcs Gall, and Gabor Szilagyi
2017	Pásztor Noémi	Miss Grand Hungary 2017	Resigned		Tamas Czegledi, Szabolcs Gall, and Gabor Szilagyi
2017	Dálma Karman	Miss International Hungary 2014	Unplaced	—	Tamas Czegledi, Szabolcs Gall, and Gabor Szilagyi
Did not compete from 2018 to 2024
2025	Szonja Dudik	Appointed	Unplaced		Szonja Dudik
Did not compete in 2026
