= Miss Europe 1984 =

International beauty pageant

- Date: February 17, 1984
- Venue: Badgastein, Austria
- Entrants: 25
- Placements: 10
- Withdrawals: Luxembourg
- Returns: Cyprus; Poland; Yugoslavia
- Winner: Neşe Erberk; Turkey

Miss Europe 1984 was the 43rd edition of the Miss Europe pageant and the 32nd edition under the Mondial Events Organization. It was held in Badgastein, Austria on February 17, 1984. Neşe Erberk of Turkey was crowned Miss Europe 1984 by outgoing titleholder Nazlı Deniz Kuruoğlu of Turkey.

== Results ==
=== Placements ===
Placement	Contestant
Miss Europe 1984	Turkey – Neşe Erberk
1st Runner-Up	France – Frédérique Marcelle Leroy
2nd Runner-Up	Finland – Sanna Marita Pekkala
3rd Runner-Up	Belgium – Françoise Bostoen
4th Runner-Up	Germany – Loana Radecki
Top 10	Austria – Mercedes Stermitz; Denmark – Tina-Lissette Dahl Jørgensen; England – Karen Lesley Moore; Greece – Plousia Farfaraki; Switzerland – Corinne Martin

=== Special awards ===
Award	Contestant
Miss Photogenic	Spain – Garbiñe Abásolo

== Contestants ==
- Austria – Mercedes Stermitz
- Belgium – Françoise Bostoen
- Cyprus – Katia Chrysochou
- Denmark – Tina-Lissette Dahl Jørgensen
- England – Karen Lesley Moore
- Finland – Sanna Marita Pekkala
- France – Frédérique Leroy
- Germany – Loana Radecki
- Gibraltar – Giselle Ruiz
- Greece – Plousia "Sia" Farfaraki
- Holland – Nancy Lalleman-Heijnis
- Iceland – Kristín Ingvadóttir
- Ireland – Patricia "Trish" Nolan
- Italy – Ambra Pellino
- Malta – Jennifer Schembri
- Norway – Janne Knutsen
- Poland – Lidia Wasiak
- Portugal – Anabela Elisa Vissenjou Ananíades
- Scotland – Linda Renton
- Spain – Garbiñe Abásolo
- Sweden – Viveca Miriam Ljung
- Switzerland – Corinne Martin
- Turkey – Neşe Erberk
- Wales – Lianne Patricia Gray
- Yugoslavia – Jadranka Mitrovic

== Notes ==
=== Returns ===
- Cyprus
- Poland
- Yugoslavia

=== Withdrawals ===
- Luxembourg
