= Henrietta Kelemen =

Hungarian model

- Born: Henrietta Kelemen; 1994 (age 31–32); Budapest, Hungary
- Height: 1.71 m (5 ft 7 1/2 in)
- Beauty pageant titleholder
- Title: Miss Hungary 2012; Miss Universe Hungary 2014
- Hair color: Dark Brown
- Eye color: Brown
- Major competitions: Miss Hungary 2012 (Winner); Miss Universe Hungary 2014 (Winner); Miss Universe 2014 (Unplaced)

Henrietta Kelemen (born 1994) is a Hungarian model and beauty pageant titleholder who was crowned Miss Universe Hungary 2014 and represented Hungary in Miss Universe 2014 pageant.

== Pageantry ==
=== Miss Hungary 2012 ===
Kelemen was crowned as Miss Hungary 2012.

=== Miss Universe Hungary 2014 ===
Kelemen was crowned as Miss Universe Hungary 2014 on 16 September 2014, and represented Budapest.

=== Miss Universe 2014 ===
Kelemen competed at the Miss Universe 2014 pageant but did not place.

Awards and achievements
Preceded by Rebeka Kárpáti	Miss Universe Hungary; 2014	Succeeded by Nikoletta Nagy
