= Belle of the Anna-ball =

Hungarian beauty pageant

The Belle of the Anna-ball is a traditional Hungarian beauty pageant, in which the winner is chosen from among the paying guests of the ball.

It is the only pageant that was held under the communist era. The ball is always held on the Saturday in July nearest to 26 July, the name day of Anna.

== History ==
The first Anna-ball was held on July 26, 1825 in Balatonfüred, a city near the Lake Balaton by Fülöp János Szentgyörgyi-Horváth for his daughter Anna-Krisztina. It was here that Anna met her husband, Ernő Kiss (later one of the Thirteen Martyrs of Arad who were executed in 1849 as the leaders of the revolution and war of independence against the Habsburg Dynasty).

In the 1800s it was the most aristocratic ball, and was visited by many artists and politicians, too, including Mihály Vörösmarty, Mór Jókai and Lujza Blaha. After World War I the ball lost its importance, but it was still held until World War II. After the war Hungary became a communist country where aristocratic balls were discouraged, but despite this the Anna ball was held again. The first one after the war was held on July 31, 1954.

== Prizes ==
Since the 1950s the title Belle of the Anna ball has been given to the most beautiful girl visiting the ball. The winner gets a Victorian style vase and the Apple of Eris, the first runner-up gets a Rothschild style vase and the second runner-up gets an Apponyi-style vase from the world-famous porcelain Manufacture of Herend. The next day the winner and the runners-up make a tour in the host city of the ball in chaise.

== Winners ==
- 1968, Annette Lantos
- 1969, Jolán Rozmis
- 1970, Mária Nagy
- 1971, Ágnes Komjáthy
- 1972, Catherina Lantos

== See also ==
- Miss Universe Hungary
- Magyarország Szépe
- Miss Hungary
