= Krisztina Bodri =

Hungarian beauty pageant contestant

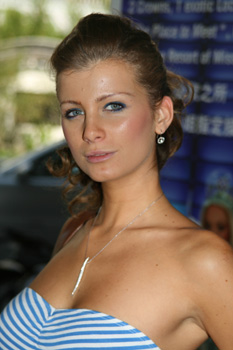
- Krisztina during Miss World 2007
- Born: Krisztina Bodri; November 30, 1986 (age 38); Budapest, Hungary
- Beauty pageant titleholder
- Title: Miss World Hungary 2007

Krisztina Bodri (born November 30, 1986) is a Hungarian beauty pageant titleholder who represented Hungary at Miss World 2007 in China.

== Education and career ==
After the pageant, she earned a doctoral degree from a law school and founded the INFUBAR Aesthetics and Healthcare center, located in Budapest, where she currently works. She later returned to pageant life briefly, serving as a judge for the Tündérszépek national beauty pageant in 2022.

== Personal life ==
Bodri is currently married to István Seffer, a plastic surgeon 32 years her senior who made headlines after being arrested for performing illegal stem cell treatments. The two met during her time at Miss World, and have at least two children.
