= Edina Balogh =

Hungarian actress

- Born: July 14, 1984 (age 42); Budapest, Hungary
- Occupations: Actress; model; beauty queen
- Years active: 2004–present

Edina Balogh (born July 14, 1984) Hungarian actress, model, and beauty queen.

== Career ==
She won Miss Hungary in 2003. She has been an actress since 2004. She was chosen as a character of the Hungarian soap opera Barátok közt (Among Friends). She has the role of Kinga Nádor. She was awarded with Zenthe Award in 2008 as the prettiest actress.
