= Garbiñe Abasolo =

Spanish model (born 1964)

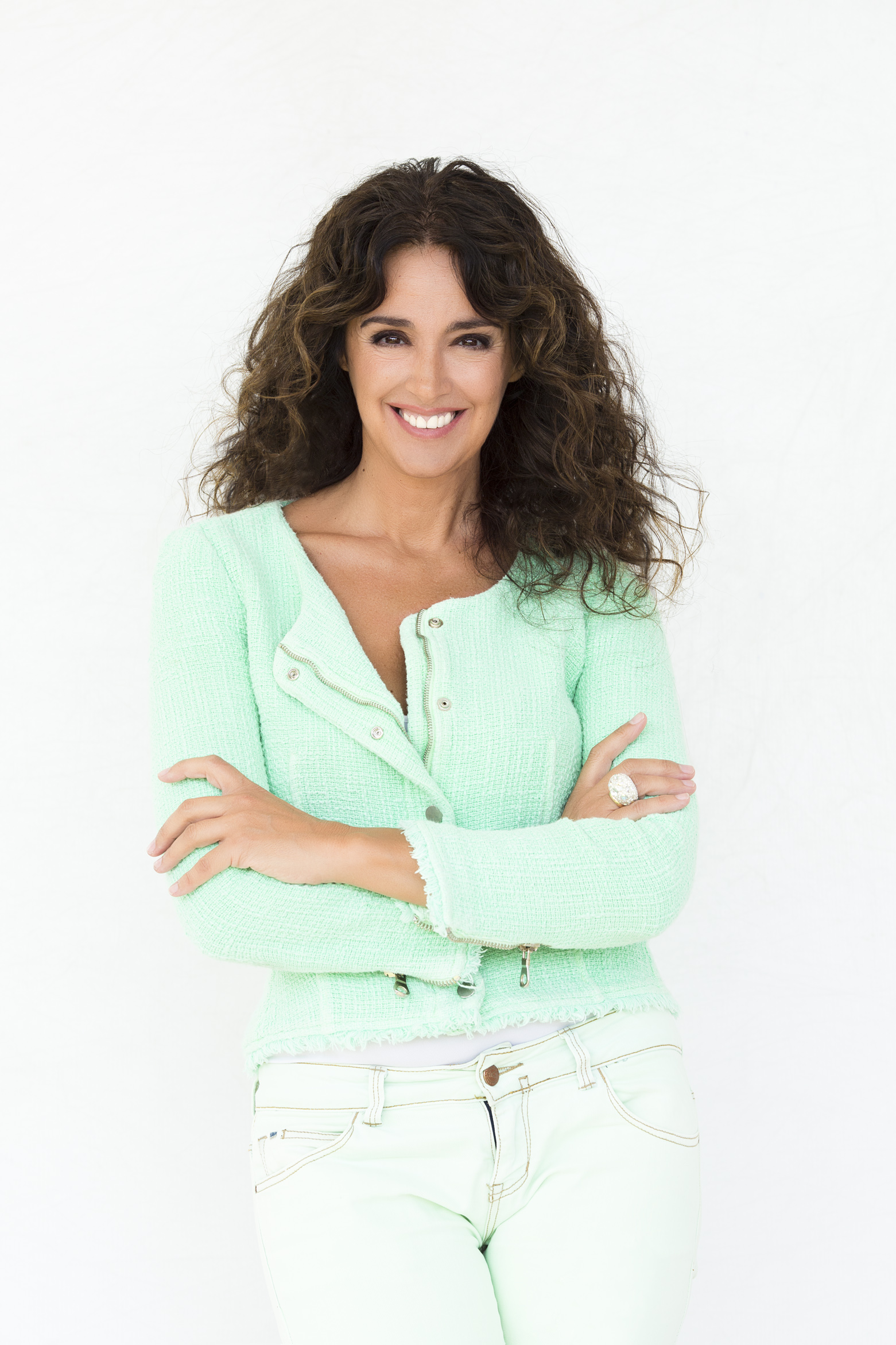
- Abasolo in 2012
- Born: Garbiñe Abasolo García; May 17, 1964 (age 62); Bilbao, Spain
- Beauty pageant titleholder
- Title: Miss Spain 1984
- Major competitions: Miss Spain 1984 (Winner); Miss Universe 1984; Miss Europe 1984

Garbiñe Abasolo García (born May 17, 1964) is a Spanish model and beauty pageant titleholder who was the first Miss Spain from the Basque region. She was crowned in 1983. She later went on to represent Spain in both Miss Universe 1984 and Miss Europe 1984 where she didn't win but was chosen as Miss Photogenic in both pageants. She has been the only contestant from Spain to be chosen for both pageants. She is married and mother of two children.

Awards and achievements
Preceded by (Switzerland) Lolita Morena	Miss Universe - Photogenic Award; 1984	Succeeded by (Netherlands) Brigitte Bergman
Preceded by (Finland) Tarja Hakakoski	Miss Europe - Photogenic Award; 1984	Unknown
Preceded by Ana Isabel Herrero García	Miss Spain; 1983	Succeeded by Juncal Rivero Fadrique Castilla
Preceded by Ana Isabel Herrero García	Miss Universe Spain; 1984	Succeeded by Maria Teresa Sánchez López
Preceded by Cristina Pérez Cottrell	Miss Europe Spain; 1984	Succeeded by Juncal Rivero Fadrique Castilla
