= Veľké Slemence =

Veľké Slemence Nagyszelmenc
- Municipality
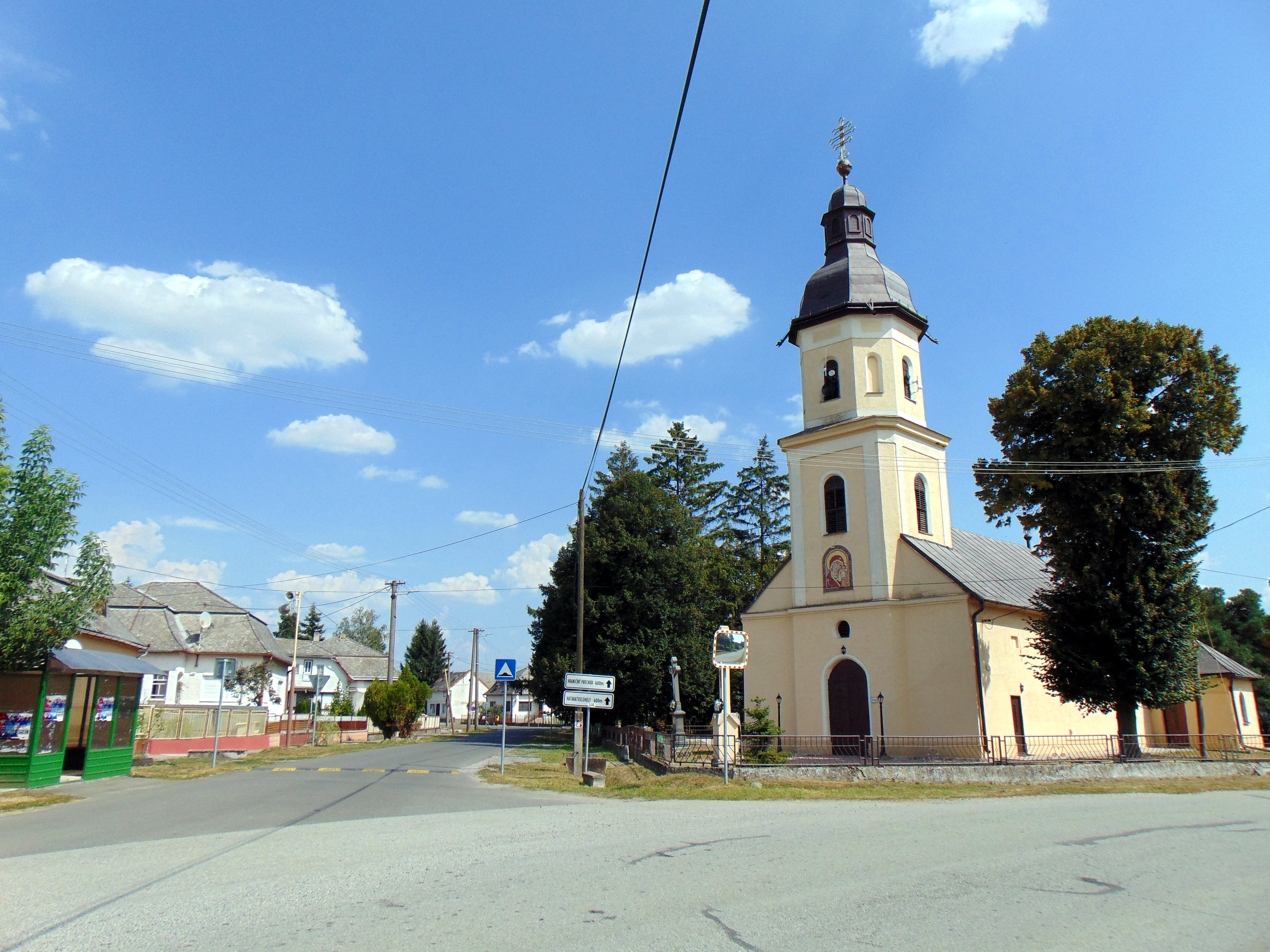

- Flag

- Location of Veľké Slemence in the Košice Region Location of Veľké Slemence in Slovakia
- Coordinates: 48.51°N 22.15°E
- Country: Slovakia
- Region: Košice Region
- District: Michalovce District
- First mentioned: 1332

Government
  - Mayor: Ľudovít Tóth (SMK-MKP)

Area
  - Total: 9.97 km^{2} (3.85 sq mi)
- Elevation: 103 m (338 ft)

Population (2025)
  - Total: 580
- Time zone: UTC+1 (CET)
  - Summer (DST): UTC+2 (CEST)
- Postal code: 767 7
- Area code: +421 56
- Vehicle registration plate (until 2022): MI
- Website: www.velkeslemence.sk

Veľké Slemence (Slovak pronunciation: [ˈʋeʎkeː ˈslementse]; Hungarian: Nagyszelmenc) is a village and municipality in Michalovce District in the Košice Region of southeastern Slovakia.

== History ==
In historical records the village was first mentioned in 1332. It was a single village named Szelmenc (between 1919 and 1938 it was called Slemence) before 1945. From 1919 until 1945, Szelmenc bore the same history as Subcarpathian Rus'. It was first ceded to Czechoslovakia in 1919, then after the First Vienna Award in 1938 it returned to the Kingdom of Hungary, then back, then, after the Soviet-Czechoslovak Treaty in 1945 was partially ceded to the Soviet Union along with Subcarpathian Rus'. The new border between the two states ran through Szelmenc. The town was divided between Slovakia (2/3) and Ukraine (1/3) by cutting it into two parts - Veľké Slemence became a part of Slovakia and Mali Selmentsi (Малі Селменці) a part of Ukraine.

In 1946, a house which lay exactly on the border was demolished with all the other objects in the way, and a 6 meter high palisade wall with watch towers and border patrolling were installed. For the next 60 years crossing between the two parts was prohibited. To meet with relatives on the other side, locals had to first travel 13 km to Uzhhorod for visas to Czechoslovakia. If their visa application, which took at least two weeks, was successful, they would travel 80 km south to the nearest border crossing, then 80 km back, and return the same way. Previously 3–500 meters and a half day, the trip became at least 160–200 km long for one way only and took at least a month to organize. Those, who tried to shout over from one side to the other were penalized on both parts. This resulted in discussing, sending messages, news in form of songs, sung loud near the border.

"Egy Szelmencből lett a kettő, egyesítse a Teremető
Áldjon Isten békességgel, tartson egybe reménységgel
Mi reményünk megmarad, összeforr mi szétszakadt
Két Szelmencnek kapuszárnya, falvainkat egybezárja"

—
(the poem on the Mali Selmeci side of the Szekely gate)

In 2003, a Székely gate (székelykapu) was installed on the border, one half of it being in the Slovak, while the other half being on the Ukrainian part of the border, with a short poem on the Mali Selmentsi part. The poem can be roughly translated as "From one Szelmenc became two, should be unified by the Creator, God bless with peace and keep us together, our hope remains, and will join together what torn apart, gate wings of the two Szelmec closes our villages together".

After the fall of communism, and more than a decade of fights with bureaucracy and negligence, a border checkpoint for pedestrians and cyclists was established in 2005 on the street which was divided. It was opened on 23 December 2005, ending 61 years of division. On 1 January 2008, Slovakia joined the Schengen Agreement, resulting in tightening of the crossing between the two Szelmences once again. The residents of Mali Selmentsi were again forced to travel to Uzhhorod to apply at the Slovak Consular Office for a visa to enter Slovakia and the Schengen Area. On the other hand, as Slovak citizens, the residents of Veľké Slemence could enter Mali Selmentsi and Ukraine without a visa. However, on 11 June 2017, the visa policy of the Schengen Area was amended. Ukrainian citizens holding biometric passports no longer require a visa to enter the Schengen Area for up to 90 days in a 180-day period. At present, the border between the two Szelmences can only be crossed by pedestrians and cyclists who are EU, EEA, Swiss and Ukrainian citizens.

The two parts have a total population of about 840 people, almost exclusively (+95%) ethnic Hungarians, with a few Romani in and around the village(s).

The elderly citizens of the two Szelmences were once citizens of Austria-Hungary, Czechoslovakia, the Kingdom of Hungary, and the Soviet Union, and now are the citizens of Slovakia (and thus the European Union) and Ukraine, while most of them have never left the village, where they were born.

The divided town, its inhabitants, and their relationships across the border, particularly in the context of the Russian invasion of Ukraine, became the subject of the 2023 book Hranica: príbehy zo slovensko-ukrajinského pohraničia by Slovak journalist Stanislava Harkotová.

== Geography ==
Veľké Slemence is situated in the southeastern part of Slovakia, within the Košice Region and Michalovce District. The municipality lies at an altitude of 103 metres (338 ft) and covers an area of 9.97 km^{2} (3.85 sq mi) (2025).

The settlement is located near the Latorica River, which originates in the Ukrainian Carpathians and flows westward through Slovakia.

== Population ==
Population statistic (10 years)
Year	1995	2005	2015	2025
Count	590	604	576	580
Difference		+2.37%	−4.63%	+0.69%

Population statistic
Year	2024	2025
Count	583	580
Difference		−0.51%

It has a population of 580 people (31 December 2025).

=== Ethnicity ===
Census 2021 (1+ %)
Ethnicity	Number	Fraction
Hungarian	486	82.65%
Slovak	73	12.41%
Not found out	49	8.33%
Romani	20	3.4%
Total	588	

In year 2021 was 588 people by ethnicity 486 as Hungarian, 73 as Slovak, 49 as Not found out, 20 as Romani and 2 as Czech.

Note on population: The difference values of population numbers in the table "Population statistic" and in the sections "Ethnicity" & "Religion" is caused by the use of various statistical methods.

=== Religion ===
Census 2021 (1+ %)
Religion	Number	Fraction
Greek Catholic Church	190	32.31%
Roman Catholic Church	183	31.12%
Calvinist Church	124	21.09%
None	41	6.97%
Not found out	37	6.29%
Evangelical Church	11	1.87%
Total	588	

In year 2021 was 588 people by religion 190 from Greek Catholic Church, 183 from Roman Catholic Church, 124 from Calvinist Church, 41 from None, 37 from Not found out, 11 from Evangelical Church, 1 from Eastern Orthodox Church and 1 from United Methodist Church.

== Culture ==
Living a life close to nature was commonplace in the area, due to its natural geographical features, until the mid-20th century. Large-scale shepherding was common in settlements near the Latorica River, including Čičarovce, Veľké Slemence, Ruská, Ptrukša, and Beša.

The village has a football pitch.

== Education ==
- Dobó István Hungarian Elementary School

== Tourism ==
Veľké Slemence became famous for tourists as a village divided by the Ukrainian border. The history of the Szekler gate, which symbolized the fragmentation of the locals, became a tourist attraction. Today, not only those interested in history arrive here, but shopping tourism has also flourished here due to the proximity of the Ukrainian border. An outstanding event of the border settlement is the Theater at the border, a summer theater festival.

For visitors traveling further, Mount Hoverla, the highest peak in the Ukrainian Carpathians at 2,061 metres, is located nearby.

== Bibliography ==
- Zelei, Miklós: A kettézárt falu. Ister Kiadó, Budapest, 2000.

== Gallery ==
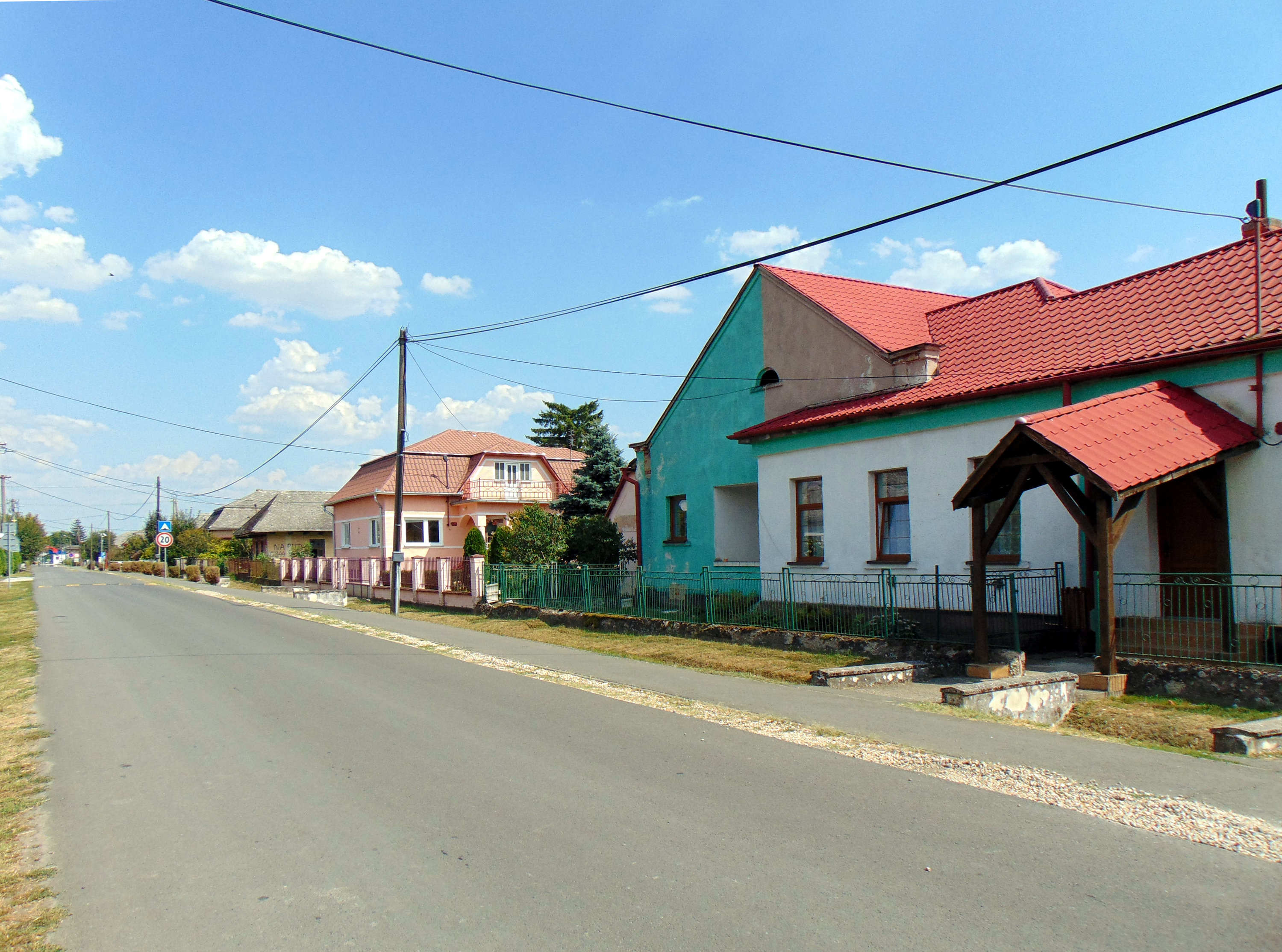
Main street in Veľké Slemence

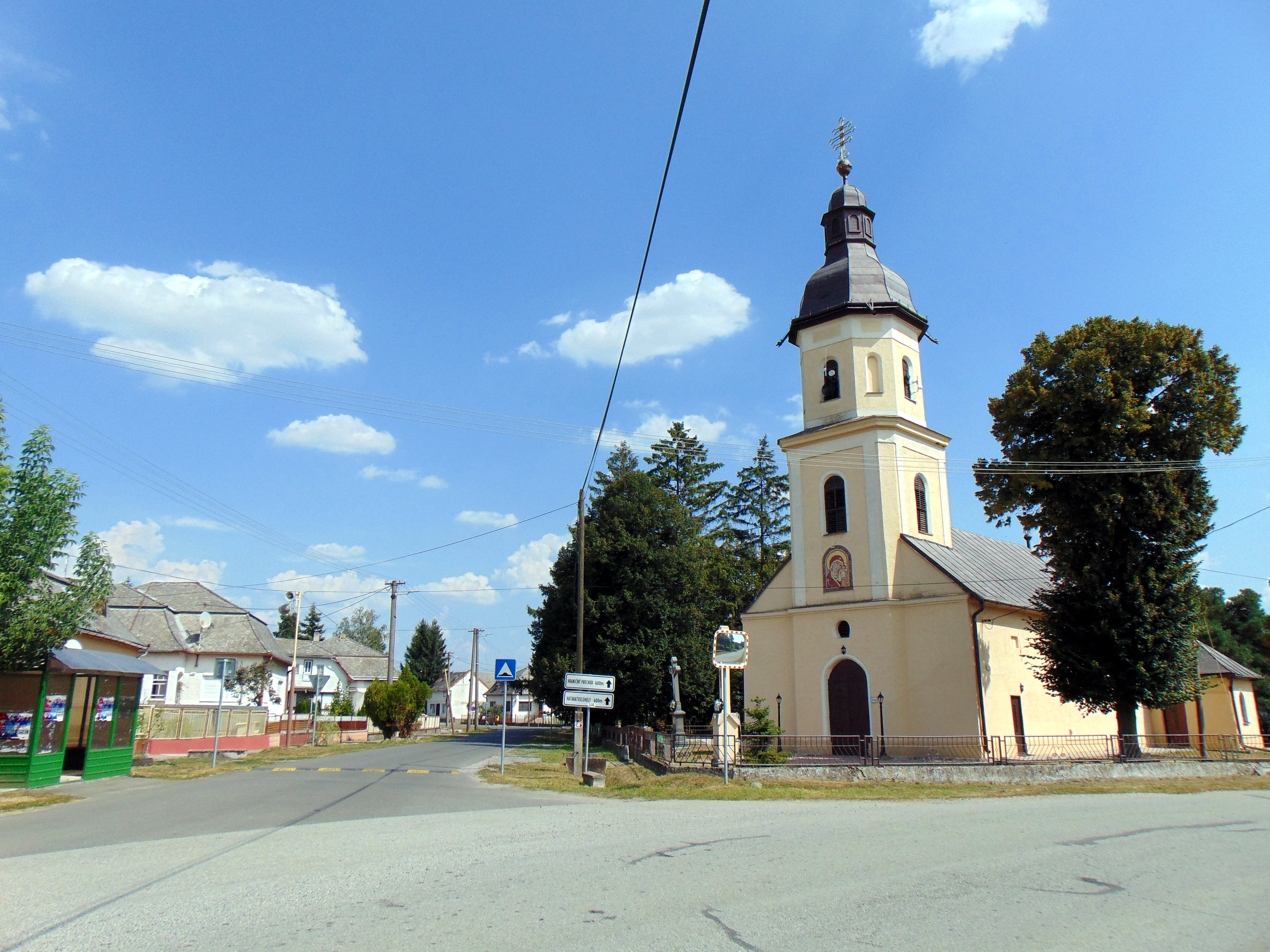
Greek Catholic church in Veľké Slemence (July 2014)

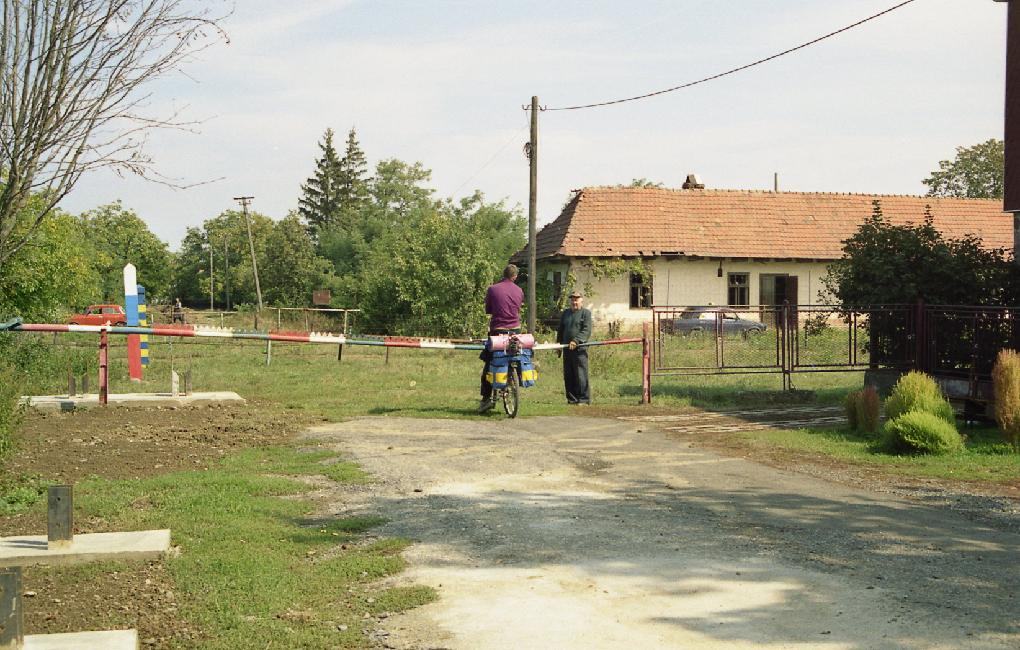
Guarded border between Slovakia and Ukraine in Veľké Slemence around 2003 (view from the Slovak side)

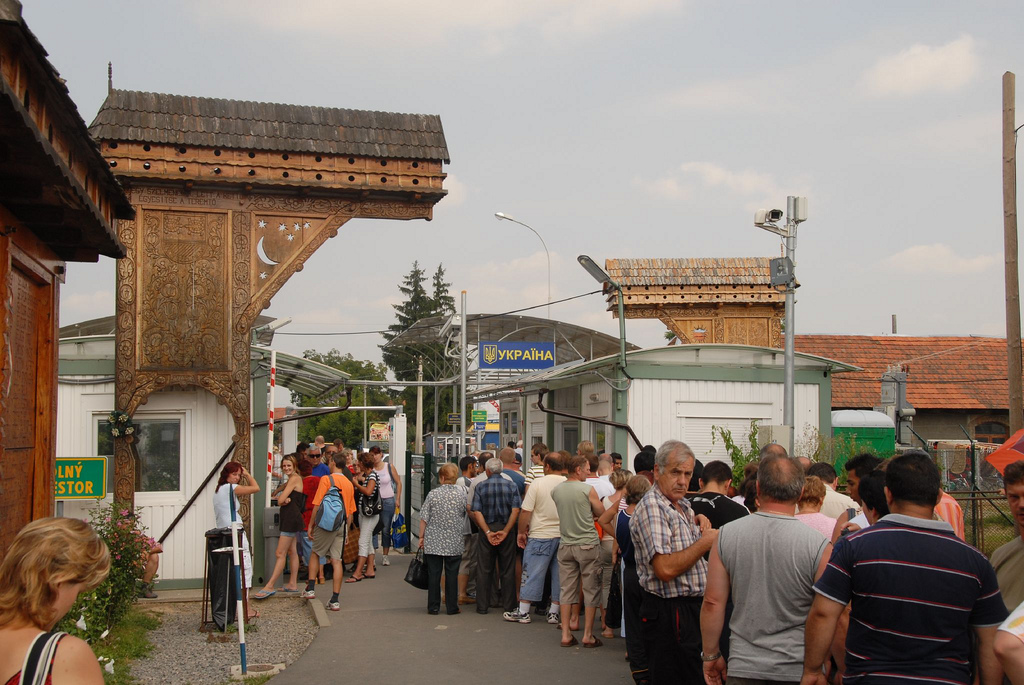
Pedestrian border crossing between Slovakia and Ukraine in Veľké Slemence, freshly opened in the late 2000s

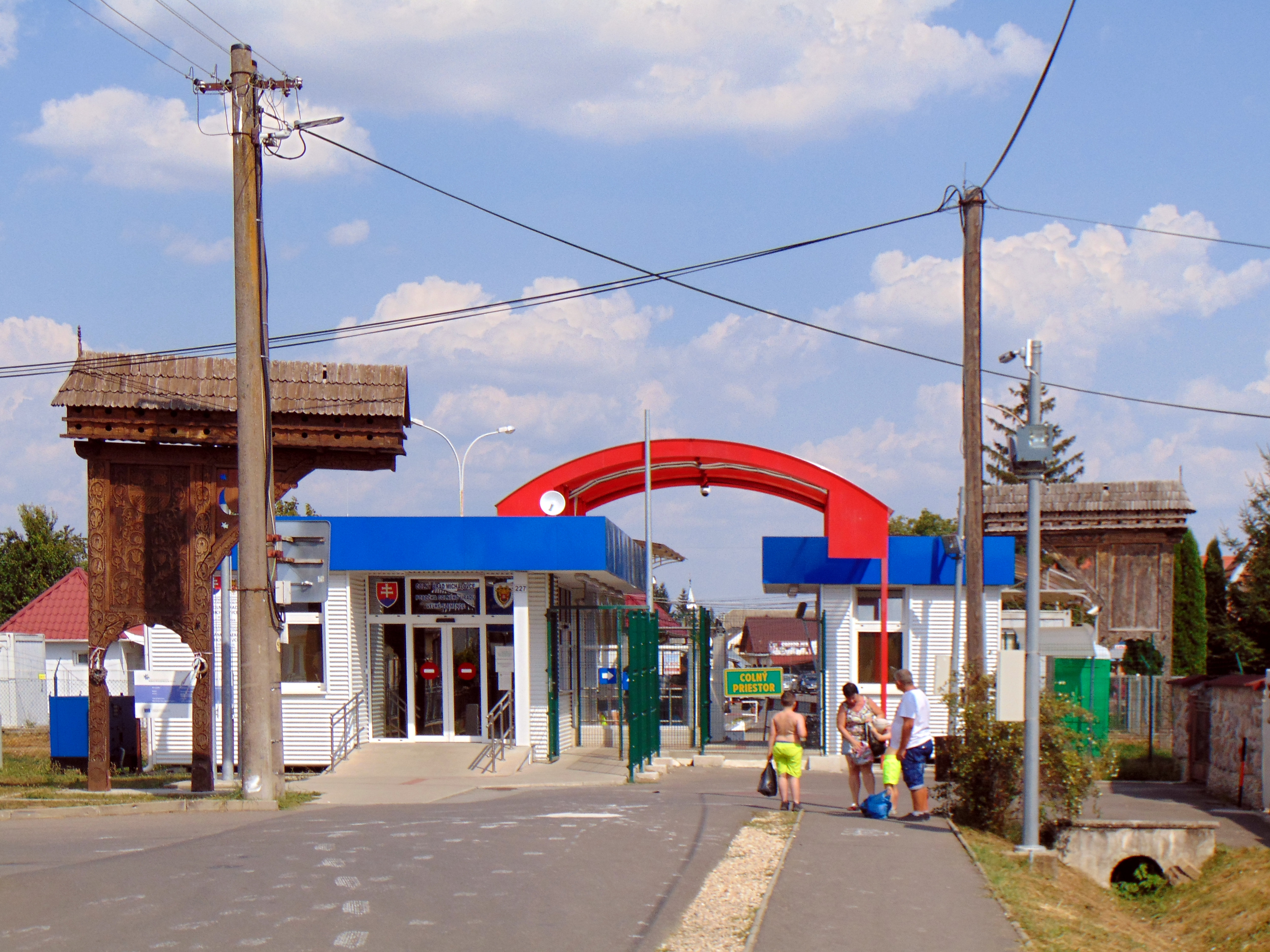
The pedestrian border crossing between Slovakia and Ukraine in Veľké Slemence (Slovak side of the border, August 2018)

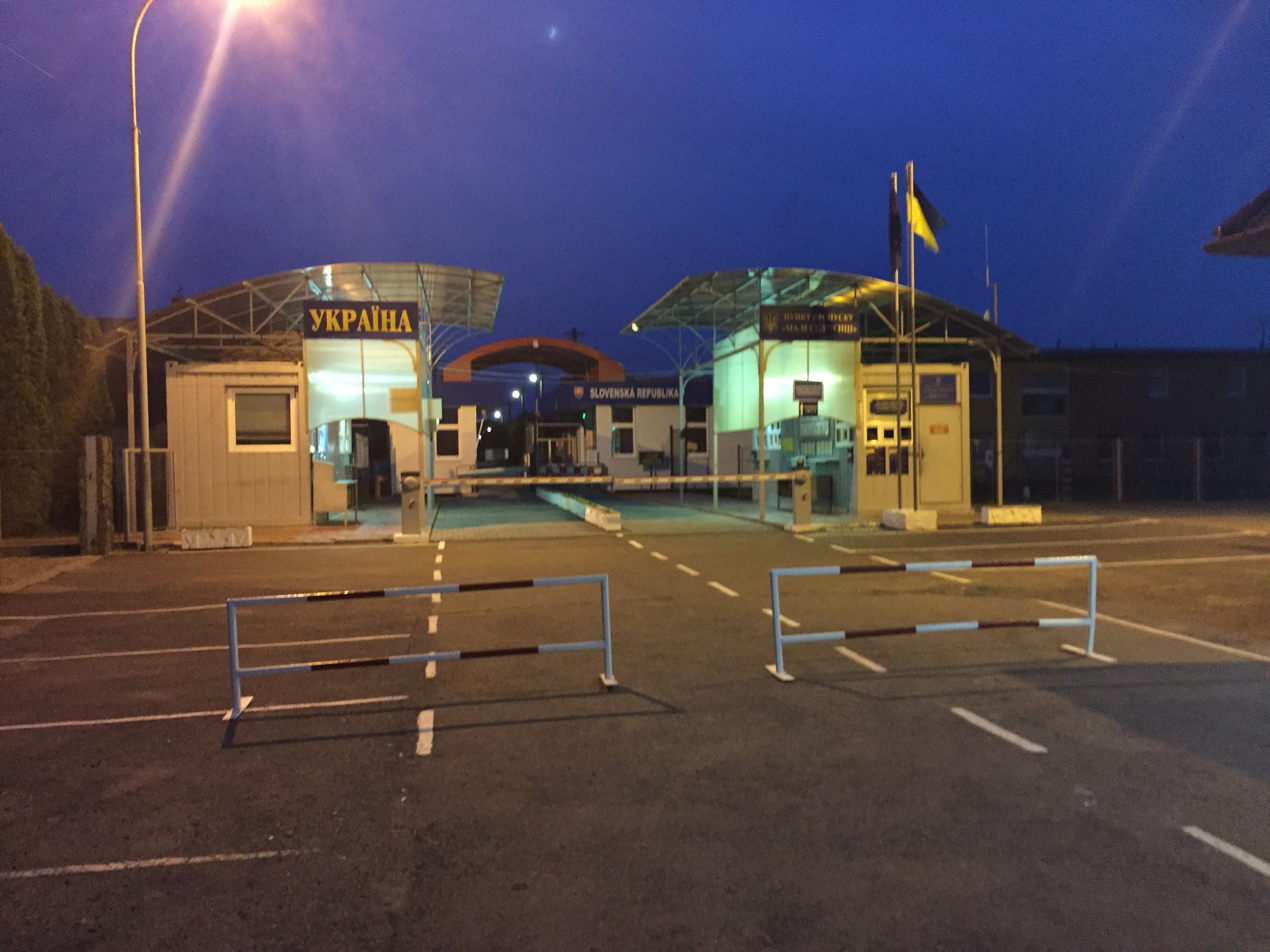
The pedestrian border crossing between Veľké Slemence, Slovakia and Mali Selmentsi, Ukraine as seen from Ukrainian side of the border, June 2017, night time.

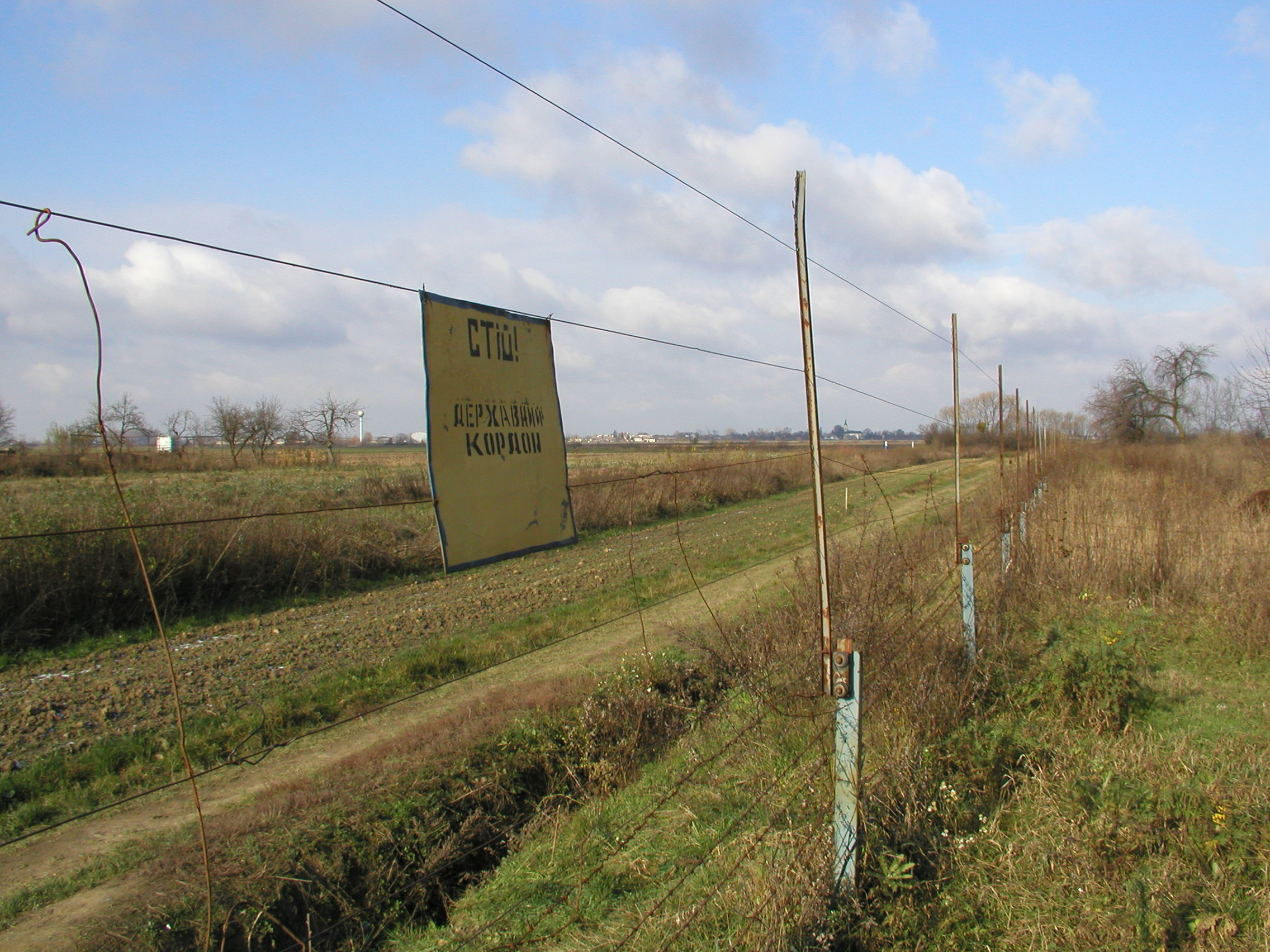
Barbed wire at guarded border between Slovakia and Ukraine in Veľké Slemence
