= Miss Europe 1985 =

International beauty pageant

- Date: May 25, 1985
- Venue: Rheingold-Halle, Mainz, Germany
- Entrants: 23
- Placements: 5
- Debuts: Israel
- Withdrawals: England, Ireland, Scotland & Wales
- Returns: Luxembourg
- Winner: Juncal Rivero; Spain

Miss Europe 1985 was the 44th edition of the Miss Europe pageant and the 33rd edition under the Mondial Events Organization. It was held at the Rheingold-Halle in Mainz, Germany on May 25, 1985. Juncal Rivero Fadrique Castilla of Spain was crowned Miss Europe 1985 by outgoing titleholder Neşe Erberk of Turkey.

== Results ==
=== Placements ===
| Placement | Contestant |
|---|---|
| Miss Europe 1985 | Spain – Juncal Rivero |
| 1st Runner-Up | Germany – Anke Symkowitz |
| 2nd Runner-Up | Holland – Brigitte Bergman |
| 3rd Runner-Up | Greece – Zoi Elmalioti |
| 4th Runner-Up | Switzerland – Lucienne Thiebaud |

== Contestants ==
- Austria – Petra Matsch
- Belgium – An Van Den Broeck
- Cyprus – Andri Andreou
- Denmark – Pia Melchioren
- Finland – Elisa Orvokki Yliniemi
- France – Suzanne Iskandar
- Germany – Anke Symkowitz
- Gibraltar – Karina Suzanne Hollands
- Greece – Zoi Elmalioti
- Holland – Brigitte Bergman
- Iceland – Guðlaug Stella Brynjolfsdóttir
- Israel – Sapir Koffmann
- Italy – Claudia Scataglini
- Luxembourg – Gaby Chiarini
- Malta – Doreen Degiorgio
- Norway – Mona Keilhau
- Poland – Magdalena Jaworska
- Portugal – Maria de Fátima Rodrigues Jardim
- Spain – Juncal Rivero
- Sweden – Cecilia Gullin
- Switzerland – Lucienne Thiebaud
- Turkey – Mülge Gördürür
- Yugoslavia – Nafazsia Masoric

== Notes ==
=== Debuts ===
- Israel

=== Withdrawals ===
- England
- Ireland
- Scotland
- Wales

=== Returns ===
- Luxembourg

== "Comité Officiel et International Miss Europe" 1986 Competition ==
Miss Europa 1986
- Date: February 28, 1986
- Venue: La Valletta, Malta
- Entrants: 24
- Placements: 5
- Winner: Raquel Bruhn (Rachel Bruhn); Sweden

In 1986, an unofficial Miss Europe competition took place in La Valletta, Malta. There were 24 delegates all from their own countries. At the end, Raquel Bruhn (Rachel Bruhn) of Sweden was crowned as Miss Europa 1986. Bruhn succeeded her predecessor Trine Elisabeth Mørk of Norway.

=== Placements ===
| Final results | Contestant |
|---|---|
| Miss Europa 1986 | Sweden – Raquel Bruhn (Rachel Bruhn) |
| 1st runner-up | France – Cecile Lartique (Cécile-Aurore Lartigue) |
| 2nd runner-up | Hungary – Csilla Andrea Molnár |
| 3rd runner-up | Spain – Begona Marcos (Begoña Marcos) |
| 4th runner-up | Austria – Elfriede Haindl |

=== Contestants ===
- Austria – Elfriede Haindl
- Belgium – Brigitte Hensch
- Cyprus – Naso Georgiuo
- Denmark – Dorte Wulff
- England – Samantha Louise Brooks
- Finland – Ulla Perasto
- France – Cecile Lartique (Cécile-Aurore Lartigue)
- Germany – Patricia Patek
- Greece – Evangelina Mantzana
- Holland – Mandy Elisabeth Jacobs
- Hungary – Csilla Andrea Molnár
- Iceland – Audur Palmadottir (Auður Pálmadóttir)
- Ireland – Tracy Dodds
- Italy – Alessandra Simona Bassi
- Liechtenstein – Annette Risch
- Malta – Fiona Micallef
- Norway – Line Veronica Jenssen
- Portugal – Isabel Correia De Oliveira
- Scotland – Morag Mathie
- Spain – Begona Marcos (Begoña Marcos)
- Sweden – Raquel Bruhn (Rachel Bruhn)
- Switzerland – Jasmine Vonlanthen
- Wales – Janet Taylor
- Yugoslavia – Eleonora Barudzija (Eleonora Barudžija)
