= Ágnes Dobó =

- Born: 5 September 1988 (age 38); Debrecen, Hungary
- Occupation: Model
- Height: 1.70 m (5 ft 7 in)
- Beauty pageant titleholder
- Title: Miss World Hungary 2010
- Hair color: Brown
- Eye color: Blue
- Major competition: A Királynő 2010 (winner)

Ágnes Dobó (born 5 September 1988) is a Hungarian model and beauty pageant titleholder who won the Hungarian national beauty contest A Királynő in 2010.

She was supposed to represent Hungary in the Miss World 2010 contest in China, but she broke her wrist and was not eligible to compete in the international pageant. Her second runner-up, Dzsenifer Kalo, who was supposed to represent Hungary in Miss Earth 2010, replaced her in Miss World.

Preceded by Orsolya Serdült	A Királynő; 2010	Succeeded by Linda Szunai
