= Miss Europe 1929 =

International beauty pageant

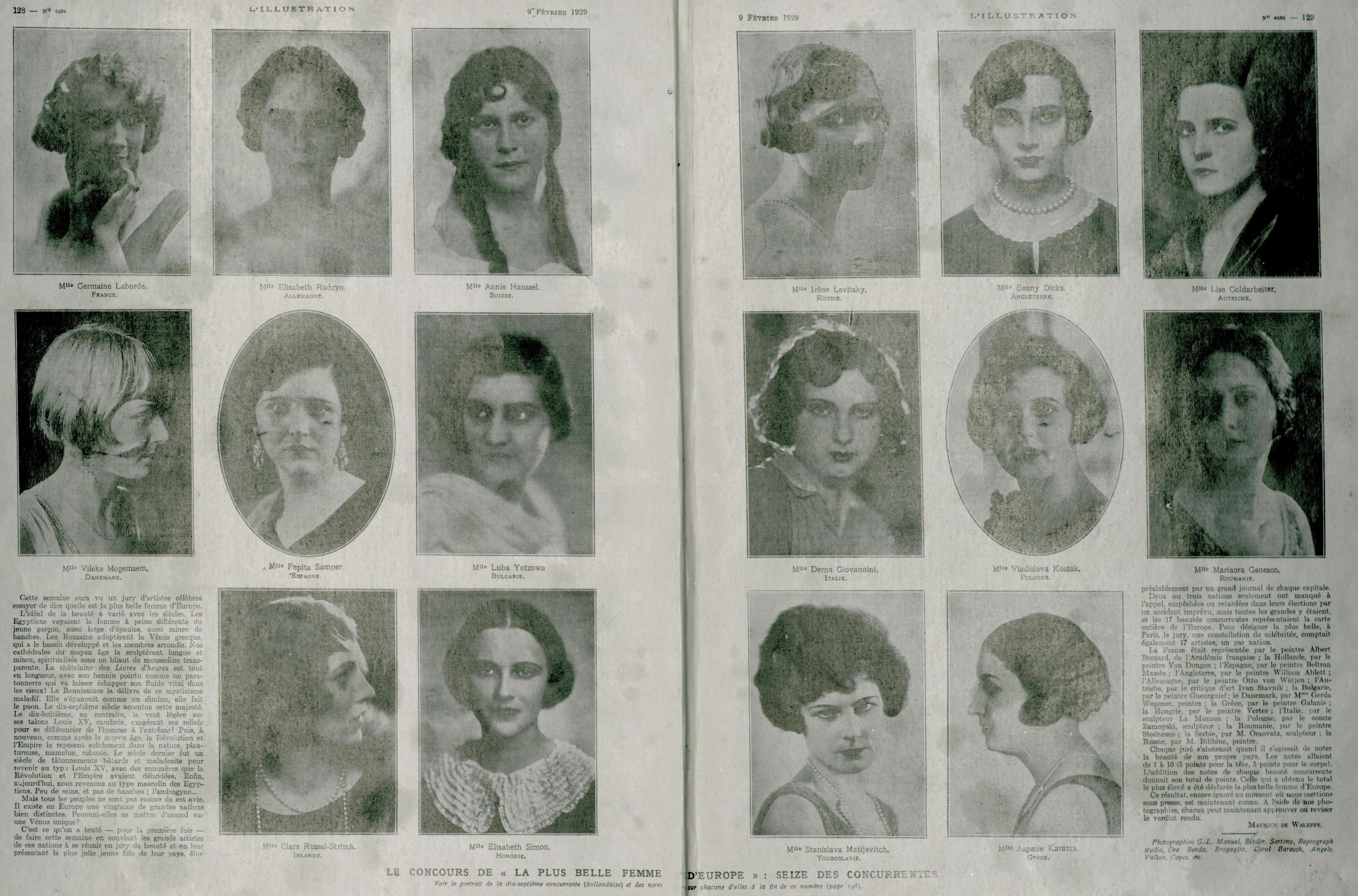
- February 9, 1929 L'Illustration journal
- Date: February 7, 1929
- Venue: Paris, France
- Entrants: 18
- Debuts: Denmark, England, France, Germany, Holland, Ireland, Italy, Luxembourg, Russia, Spain, Switzerland
- Withdrawals: Baltic States, Czechoslovakia, Turkey
- Winner: Elzbieta Simon; Hungary

Miss Europe 1929 was the second annual Miss Europe pageant and the first under French journalist Maurice de Waleffe. Maurice de Waleffe also created in 1920 what in 1927 had become the Miss France pageant. Miss Hungary, Böske Simon, won the pageant title and became the first Jewish woman to be crowned Miss Europe. Eighteen European girls competed.

== Results ==
=== Placements ===
Placement	Contestant
Miss Europe 1929	Hungary – Elzbieta Simon
1st Runner-Up	Poland – Władysława Kostakówna
2nd Runner-Up	France – Germaine Laborde

== Contestants ==
A total of 18 contestants competed for the crown of Miss Europe 1929:

- Austria – Lisl Goldarbeiter
- Bulgaria – Luba Yotzoff
- Denmark – Vibeke Mogensen
- England – Benny Dicks
- France – Germaine Laborde
- Germany – Elisabeth Yvette Rodzyn
- Greece – Aspasie Karatja
- Holland – Johanna Koopman
- Hungary – Elzbieta "Böske" Simon
- Ireland – Clara Russell-Stritch
- Italy – Derna Giovannini
- Luxembourg – Ketty Hipp
- Poland – Władysława Kostakówna
- Romania – Marioara Cranescu
- Russia (in exile) – Irina Levitskaya
- Spain – Pepita Samper Bono
- Switzerland – Annie Haussel
- Yugoslavia – Stanislava Matijević

== Notes ==
Miss Austria, Lisl Goldarbeiter, also competed at the International Pageant of Pulchritude 1929; where she won. Misses England, France, Holland, and Luxembourg also competed, but did not place.
