= Neşe Erberk =

Turkish businesswoman and former Miss Europe

Neşe Erberk (born October 14, 1964) is a Turkish businesswoman, a former fashion model, beauty contestant and Miss Europe 1984.

== Biography ==
She was born on October 14, 1964, in Istanbul, Turkey. She completed her education at Robert College and Boğaziçi University.

After winning the title of Miss Turkey 1983, Neşe represented her country the next year at the Miss Europe beauty contest held in Bad Gastein, Austria, and was crowned Miss Europe. She became the fourth Turkish beauty queen to do so, following Günseli Başar, Filiz Vural and Nazlı Deniz Kuruoğlu.

Neşe began her career as a model during her high school years and continued after her participation at beauty pageants. In 1987, she founded her own model and casting agency, which grew to one of the biggest today. In 2002 she founded her first preschool which grew into 49 schools including franchises all around Turkey. She is the mother of female triplets - Alin, Selin and Lara, born in 1999.

Awards
| Preceded by (Turkey) Nazlı Deniz Kuruoğlu | Miss Europe; 1984 | Succeeded by (Spain) Juncal Rivero Fadrique Castilla |
