= Ágnes Konkoly =

Miss Universe Hungary 2012

- Born: Ágnes Konkoly; 23 July 1987 (age 39); Budapest, Hungary
- Occupations: Model; wedding planner
- Height: 1.75 m (5 ft 9 in)
- Beauty pageant titleholder
- Title: Miss Universe Hungary 2012
- Hair color: Brown
- Eye color: Black
- Major competitions: Miss Universe Hungary 2011 (1st runner-up); Miss Supranational 2011 (Top 20); Miss Universe Hungary 2012 (Winner); Miss Universe 2012 (Top 10)

Ágnes Konkoly (born 23 July 1987) is a Hungarian model, wedding planner and beauty pageant titleholder who was crowned Miss Universe Hungary 2012 and represented her country in the Miss Universe 2012 pageants.

== Early life ==
Ágnes is a Wedding Planner in Hungary.

== Miss Supranational Hungary 2011 ==
Ágnes competed at Miss Supranational 2011 and she placed on top 20 semi-finalists.

== Miss Universe Hungary 2012 and Miss Universe 2012 ==
Ágnes Konkoly was crowned "Miss Universe Hungary 2012" at the grand coronation night of Beauty Queen 2012 at the TV2 studios in Budapest on Saturday night of 9 June 2012. In the Miss Universe 2012, Konkoly had reached the top 10, which is the highest placement, to date, for Hungary at the pageant.

Awards and achievements
Preceded by Betta Lipcsei	Miss Universe Hungary; 2012	Succeeded by Rebeka Kárpáti
