= Dobó István Hungarian Elementary School =

School in eastern Slovakia

Coordinates: 48.5104°N 22.1385°E

- Nagyszelmenc; Slovakia

Information
- Established: 1886; 139 years ago

Dobó István Hungarian Elementary School is situated in Nagyszelmenc, which is a small village of eastern Slovakia. However, it is a Hungarian School, since 97% of the population of the village is Hungarian.

== History ==
In 1886 the first parish school opened in Nagyszelmenc. It was very significant for the village since till that time the parents had to send their children to schools in Ruszka or Palágy which were faith-based schools. The first school was made of wood and it had only one classroom. In 1906, a school with two classrooms was built.

In 1945, the number of children decreased since the new state border cut down the village into 2 sides, and from that time one side, Kisszelmenc, became part of Ukraine and the education was in Slovak. But the parents did not want to take their children into the Slovak school which influenced the school standard badly.

In 1950, education became run in Hungarian again. As a result of this, the numbers of children began to increase; therefore it was necessary to build a new, bigger school. The new school was built in the school year of 1956/57.

From that time that building is the school building of Nagyszelmenc. After 1989, the life of the school changed, too. It became more democratic and teachers got more freedom, and they also got the opportunity to show their creativity and suitability in the field of teaching. The teaching of English language and the Bible was launched in this year, as well. In 2002, the local government became the supporter of the school and they began to renovate the institution.

The School was appraised into Dobó István Hungarian Elementary School in the school year of 2005/2006 after the proposal of the new director, PaedDr. Hack László. The school has three twin schools:

- Elementary School of Palágykomoróc, in Ukraine
- Elementary School of Mád, in Hungary
- Elementary School of Vámosújfalu, in Hungary

== Extracurricular activities ==
Student groups and activities include literary study group, conversationalist study group, ”skillful hands” study group, dance study group, computer studies, and tourism study group.

The attendance of the school traditions is one of the most important resort of the school's badinage. Therefore, the school deliberately cultivates, keeps and improves the different traditions. It is very important for the school to organize various public programs which can develop the community. The traditions held in the school: - Santa Claus - Christmas - Carnival - St. Valentine's Day - The Day of Children - Graduating - 'Mums and Dads you have to come'

'Mums and Dads you have to come' is a special tradition of the school. It is held after the graduation ceremony among the children with their parents and the teachers with their family. There are a lot of playful competitions, football matches, driving, archery and other sports for the children where they play with their parents. There is a goulash cooking race as well from which everybody can eat after the races.

== Former directors ==
- Urbán Lajos (1950–1953)
- Balogh István (1953–1956)
- Kovács László (1956–1961)
- Icsó Béla (1961–1990)
- Erdélyi Róbert (1990–1991)
- Mórik István (1991–2000)
- Kalitza Miklós (2000–2005)
