= Dobo Forest Park =

Forest Park in The Gambia

- IUCN category IV (habitat/species management area)
- Interactive map of Dobo Forest Park
- Location: North Bank Division Gambia
- Nearest city: Salikenne
- Coordinates: 13°33′16″N 15°57′21″W
- Area: 732 ha (1,810 acres)
- Established: January 1, 1954

Dobo Forest Park is a forest park in the Gambia. Established on January 1, 1954, it covers 732 hectares.

It is located at an estimated height of 9 meters above sea level. The park borders the village of Dobo.
