= Dobo, The Gambia =

Dobo
- Village
- Location of Dobo
- Coordinates: 13°28′24.2″N 14°38′24.3″W
- Country: The Gambia
- Division: Central River Division
- District: Sami District

Area
  - Total: 0.22 km^{2} (0.085 sq mi)
- Elevation: 39 m (128 ft)

Population
  - Total: 535
  - Density: 2,400/km^{2} (6,300/sq mi)
- Time zone: UTC+0 (Greenwich Mean Time)

Dobo is a small village located in Sami District, Central River Division in The Gambia, a country in West Africa. The village borders the Dobo Forest Park.

== Other Information ==
Dobo has a permanent population of around 535. It is situated 39 metres above sea level. The town has a mosque.
