= Miss Spain 2019 =

Miss Spain 2019 may refer to these events:

- Miss Universe Spain 2019, Miss Spain 2019 for Miss Universe 2019
- Miss World Spain 2019, Miss Spain 2019 for Miss World 2019
