= Miss Spain 2017 =

Miss Spain 2017 may refer to these events:

- Miss Universe Spain 2017, Miss Spain 2017 for Miss Universe 2017
- Miss World Spain 2017, Miss Spain 2017 for Miss World 2017
