= Miss World Spain 2019 =

7th edition of Miss World Spain pageant in 2019

- Date: August 18, 2019
- Venue: Carvajal Auditorium, Melilla, Spain
- Entrants: 53
- Placements: 20
- Returns: Burgos; Canary Islands
- Winner: María Del Mar Aguilera Zuheros; Córdoba

Miss World Spain 2019 was the 7th edition of the Miss World Spain pageant, held on August 18, 2019. María Del Mar Aguilera Zuheros of Córdoba won the title and went on to represent Spain at Miss World 2019.

== Results ==
=== Placements ===
Placement	Contestant
Miss World Spain 2019	Córdoba – María Del Mar Aguilera Zuheros
1st Runner-Up	Las Palmas – Tania Medina
2nd Runner-Up	Tenerife – Marta Lopez

Ganadora prueba Multimedia: Jaen Ganadora prueba Top Model: Pontevedra Ganadora prueba deportiva: Gipuzkoa Ganadora prueba traje regional: Segovia Ganadora prueba Talento: Sevilla

== Official Delegates ==
Province	Candidate	Age	Height
Albacete	Noelia Cotillas	20	175 cm (5 ft 9 in)
Alicante	Alba Rodríguez	18	174 cm (5 ft 8.5 in)
Almería	Oriana Correia	18	174 cm (5 ft 8.5 in)
Araba	Erika Villar	22	177 cm (5 ft 9.5 in)
Asturias	Sara Haroug	19	170 cm (5 ft 7 in)
Ávila	Evelyn Hernández	22	167 cm (5 ft 5.5 in)
Badajoz	Naiara Gómez	25	172 cm (5 ft 7.5 in)
Balearic Islands	Andrea Bejarano	18	175 cm (5 ft 9 in)
Barcelona	Helena Jiménez	18	173 cm (5 ft 8 in)
Burgos	Julia Carrascal	18	178 cm (5 ft 10 in)
Cáceres	Isabel Ventura	19	172 cm (5 ft 7.5 in)
Cádiz	Paula Ramirez	18	173 cm (5 ft 8 in)
Canary Islands	Ariadna Fregel	20	175 cm (5 ft 9 in)
Cantabria	Elisa García	17	174 cm (5 ft 8.5 in)
Castellón	Cristina Campillo	23	178 cm (5 ft 10 in)
Ceuta	Sara Martinez Abselam	20	175 cm (5 ft 9 in)
Ciudad Real	Celia Molero	19	168 cm (5 ft 6 in)
Córdoba	Maria del Mar Aguilera Zuheros	21	176 cm (5 ft 9.5 in)
Cuenca	Anabel Saavedra	17	175 cm (5 ft 9 in)
Gerona	Alva Covarrubias	22	170 cm (5 ft 7 in)
Granada	Rosa Ortega	19	167 cm (5 ft 5.5 in)
Guadalajara	Leticia Szulc	17	173 cm (5 ft 8 in)
Guipúzcoa	Yaiza Etxaniz	20	172 cm (5 ft 7.5 in)
Huelva	Lourdes Bernabé	23	178 cm (5 ft 10 in)
Huesca	Ainara Navarro	21	171 cm (5 ft 7.5 in)
Jaén	Marta Lopez	21	175 cm (5 ft 9 in)
La Coruña	Miriam Gaute	19	174 cm (5 ft 8.5 in)
La Rioja	Patricia Bilyak	18	170 cm (5 ft 7 in)
Las Palmas	Tania Medina	20	177 cm (5 ft 9.5 in)
León	Claudia Blanco	23	172 cm (5 ft 7.5 in)
Lérida	Aroa Vieiros	22	175 cm (5 ft 9 in)
Lugo	Susana Adkinson	18	180 cm (5 ft 11 in)
Madrid	Sheila Monjas	22	180 cm (5 ft 11 in)
Málaga	Noemí Delgado	25	178 cm (5 ft 10 in)
Melilla	Laura Gallardo	22	173 cm (5 ft 8 in)
Murcia	Sandra Grohs	25	174 cm (5 ft 8.5 in)
Navarre	Sara Ianitsa	22	177 cm (5 ft 9.5 in)
Orense	Nayara Pena	23	162 cm (5 ft 4 in)
Palencia	Cynthia Carvajal	24	168 cm (5 ft 6 in)
Pontevedra	Laura González	23	172 cm (5 ft 7.5 in)
Salamanca	Elisabeth Martín	19	177 cm (5 ft 9.5 in)
Segovia	Daniela Montañés	26	176 cm (5 ft 9.5 in)
Sevilla	Julianna Ro	25	176 cm (5 ft 9.5 in)
Soria	Adela Corujo	26	175 cm (5 ft 9 in)
Tarragona	Araceli Bazán	23	175 cm (5 ft 9 in)
Tenerife	Marta González	19	177 cm (5 ft 9.5 in)
Teruel	Nerea Moreno	22	175 cm (5 ft 9 in)
Toledo	María Jesús Ibañez	21	175 cm (5 ft 9 in)
Valencia	Andrea Galán	18	173 cm (5 ft 8 in)
Valladolid	Marina González	24	173 cm (5 ft 8 in)
Vizcaya	Jara Rodríguez	25	176 cm (5 ft 9.5 in)
Zamora	Maria Mediavilla	20	175 cm (5 ft 9 in)
Zaragoza	María José Páez	20	176 cm (5 ft 9.5 in)

== Notes ==
=== Returns ===
Last competed in 2017:

- Burgos
- Canary Islands

=== Did not compete ===
- Aragón
- Galicia
