= Miss World Spain 2017 =

- Date: September 16, 2017
- Presenters: Ares Teixidó; Daniel Montesdeoca
- Venue: Palace of Sports and Conferences, Gerona, Spain; Hotel Alegría Nautic Park, Gerona, Spain
- Entrants: 53
- Placements: 20
- Winner: Maria Elisabeth Tulián; Balearic Islands

Miss World Spain 2017 was the 5th edition of the Miss World Spain pageant, held on September 16, 2017. The winner was Maria Elisabeth Tulián Marín of Balearic Islands and she represented Spain in Miss World 2017. This was the first edition of Miss World Spain under the Nuestra Belleza España after the gained the franchise the previous year after the Be Miss Organization gave up the license to focus solely on Miss Universe Spain.

== Results ==
=== Results ===
Placement	Contestant
Miss World Spain 2017	Balearic Islands – Maria Elisabeth Tulián
1st Runner-Up	Cantabria – Katixa Elizegui
2nd Runner-Up	Valencia – Mercedes Riviera
Top 5	Cádiz – Asunción Martín Bullón; Tenerife – Gara Aguiar Wilhelmsson
Top 10	Barcelona – Carla Olivares; Canary Islands – Raquel Iboleón; Jaén – Marina Ruiz; Las Palmas – Nereida Ramírez; Málaga – Jennifer Medalle
Top 20	Albacete – María Sánchez López; Almería – María González Sánchez; Araba – Ane Nebreda; Guadalajara – Nidia Cerrillo Peláez; Huelva – Sara Huelva; Madrid – Paula Delgado; Melilla – Sheyla Gutiérrez; Palencia – Paula Riba; Sevilla – María Barcia; Vizcaya – Alba Díez

=== Challenge Events ===
==== Beauty with a Purpose ====
Final results	Contestant
Winner	Araba – Ane Nebreda
Top 5	Balearic Islands – Maria Elisabeth Tulián Marín; Canary Islands – Raquel Iboleón; Lugo – Carlota González; Vizcaya – Alba Díez

==== Multimedia ====
Final results	Contestant
Winner	Melilla – Sheyla Gutiérrez
Top 5	Lugo – Carlota González; Pontevedra – Tamara Balsa; Teruel – Cara Garbanzo; Zamora – Erica Sánchez

==== Top Model ====
Final results	Contestant
Winner	Tenerife – Gara Aguiar Wilhelmsson
Top 5	Araba – Ane Nebreda; Canary Islands – Raquel Iboleón; Castellón – Jessica Herman Ruiz; Valencia – Mercedes Riviera

==== Sports ====
Final results	Contestant
Winner	Balearic Islands – Maria Elisabeth Tulián Marín
Top 5	Alicante – Barbara Imfeld Elvira; Canary Islands – Raquel Iboleón; Granada – Rocío Barea Calero; León – Irma Álvarez

==== Talent ====
Final results	Contestant
Winner	Madrid – Paula Delgado
Top 5	Balearic Islands – Maria Elisabeth Tulián Marín; Cádiz – Asunción Martín Bullón; Málaga – Jennifer Medalle; Segovia – Xinia Escribano

==== Swimsuit ====
Final results	Contestant
Winner	Las Palmas – Nereida Ramírez
Top 5	Balearic Islands – Maria Elisabeth Tulián Marín; Barcelona – Carla Olivares; Málaga – Jennifer Medalle; Valencia – Mercedes Riviera

==== Regional Costume ====
Final results	Contestant
Winner	Huelva – Sara Huelva
Top 5	Cantabria – Katixa Elizegui; Salamanca – Cristina Escudero; Segovia – Xinia Escribano; Sevilla – María Barcia

== Judges ==
- Fran Fajardo, journalist from the Canary Islands 7
- Mireia Lalaguna Royo, Miss World Spain 2015 and Miss World 2015
- Susana de la Llave Varón, Miss Spain World 1988 and 4th Runner-Up of Miss World 1988

== Official Delegates ==
Province	Candidate	Age
Albacete	María Sánchez López	25
Alicante	Barbara Imfeld Elvira	21
Almería	María González Sánchez	19
Araba	Ane Nebreda	20
Asturias	Malú Sánchez	21
Ávila	Clara Sáez	23
Badajoz	María Gamero Rodríguez	20
Balearic Islands	Maria Elisabeth Tulián Marín	21
Barcelona	Carla Olivares	24
Burgos	Claudia Izquierdo	17
Cáceres	Coribel Pérez	22
Cádiz	Asunción Martín Bullón	26
Canary Islands	Raquel Iboleón	20
Cantabria	Katixa Elizegui	18
Castellón	Jessica Herman Ruiz	23
Ciudad Real	Clara María Sánchez Martínez	23
Córdoba	Alba Ruiz	20
Cuenca	Yohanna León Collado	25
Gerona	Judit Pérez	
Granada	Rocío Barea Calero	23
Guadalajara	Nidia Cerrillo Peláez	24
Guipúzcoa	Naiara Monroy	19
Huelva	Sara Huelva	18
Huesca	Cristina Calvo	25
Jaén	Marina Ruiz	23
La Coruña	Fátima Pérez	22
La Rioja	Begoña Fernández	24
Las Palmas	Nereida Ramírez	20
León	Irma Álvarez	23
Lérida	Erika Dopico	21
Lugo	Carlota González	21
Madrid	Paula Delgado	18
Málaga	Jennifer Medalle	26
Melilla	Sheyla Gutiérrez	19
Murcia	Cristina Tortosa	18
Navarre	Nerea Egozkue	20
Orense	Ana Valencia	22
Palencia	Paula Riba	18
Pontevedra	Tamara Balsa	20
Salamanca	Cristina Escudero	21
Segovia	Xinia Escribano	23
Sevilla	María Barcia	18
Soria	Alicia Rubio	18
Tarragona	Verónica Martínez	
Tenerife	Gara Aguiar Wilhelmsson	19
Teruel	Cara Garbanzo	21
Toledo	Nahjara Ándujar	17
Valencia	Mercedes Riviera	23
Valladolid	Ana Guijarro	24
Vizcaya	Alba Díez	24
Zamora	Erica Sánchez	24
Zaragoza	Elena Andrés	24

== Notes ==
=== Did not compete ===
- Aragón
- Ceuta
- Galicia
