= Miss Polonia 2022 =

44th Miss Polonia

- Date: 27 May 2022
- Presenters: Karolina Bielawska; Izabella Krzan; Aleksander Sikora; Mateusz Szymkowiak
- Entertainment: Ewelina Lisowska; Krystian Ochman; Filip Lato; Gromee
- Venue: Hala widowiskowo - sportowa OSiR, Włocławek, Poland
- Broadcaster: TVP2
- Entrants: 20
- Placements: 10
- Withdrawals: Germany
- Returns: Lower Silesia; Podlaskie; Subcarpathia
- Winner: Krystyna Sokołowska; Podlaskie

Miss Polonia 2022 was the 44th Miss Polonia pageant, held at the Hala widowiskowo - sportowa OSiR in Włocławek, Poland, on 27 May 2022.

The winner was Krystyna Sokołowska of Podlaskie. Sokołowska represented Poland at Miss World 2023. Second runner-up, Julia Baryga, represented Poland at Miss Earth 2022. Top five finalist, Sylwia Bober, represented the country at Miss Charm 2023 and placed in the Top 20. Top 5 finalist, Klaudia Andrzejewska, represented Poland at Miss Intercontinental 2022.

== Results ==
=== Placements ===
Placement	Contestant	International Placement
Miss Polonia 2022	Podlaskie – Krystyna Sokołowska	Unplaced – Miss World 2023
1st Runner-Up	West Pomerania – Karolina Malina	Top 21 – Miss United Nations 2023
2nd Runner-Up	Łódź – Julia Baryga	Unplaced – Miss Earth 2022
Top 5	Kuyavia-Pomerania – Klaudia Andrzejewska	Unplaced – Miss Intercontinental 2022
Top 5	Lublin – Sylwia Bober	Top 20 – Miss Charm 2023
Top 10	Greater Poland – Agnieszka Brewka; Greater Poland – Sandra Staszewska; Pomerania – Klaudia Ligenza; Silesia – Daniela Szewczyk; Subcarpathia – Klaudia Mendyka	

=== Special awards ===
Award	Contestant
Miss Beauty with a Purpose	Łódź – Julia Baryga
Miss Natura Drugstore	Greater Poland – Agnieszka Brewka
Miss Public Vote	Greater Poland – Sandra Staszewska

== Jury ==
The jury (judging panel) consisted of:

- Ida Nowakowska
- Natalia Gryglewska – Miss Polonia 2020
- Aleksandra Stajszczak – Miss Polonia 1993
- Milena Sadowska – Miss Polonia 2018
- Jagoda Piątek-Włodarczyk
- Małgorzata Tomaszewska
- Aneta Wachnik
- Rafał Brzozowski
- Jakub Kucner
- Andrzej Pabich

== Official Delegates ==
Represents	Candidate	Age	Height
Greater Poland	Agnieszka Brewka	23	180 cm (5 ft 11 in)
Greater Poland	Sandra Staszewska	23	174 cm (5 ft 8.5 in)
Kuyavia-Pomerania	Klaudia Andrzejewska	20	179 cm (5 ft 10.5 in)
Lesser Poland	Angelika Kopcińska	25	166 cm (5 ft 5.5 in)
Łódź	Julia Baryga	19	173 cm (5 ft 8 in)
Łódź	Natalia Kiszko	23	176 cm (5 ft 9 in)
Łódź	Weronika Rosiak	20	179 cm (5 ft 10.5 in)
Lower Silesia	Aleksandra Lenart	23	177 cm (5 ft 9.5 in)
Lower Silesia	Wiktoria Ignaczak	22	181 cm (5 ft 11 in)
Lublin	Katarzyna Stolarczyk	21	177 cm (5 ft 9.5 in)
Lublin	Sylwia Bober	24	171 cm (5 ft 7 in)
Masovia	Maria Wójcik	21	180 cm (5 ft 11 in)
Podlaskie	Krystyna Sokołowska	25	180 cm (5 ft 11 in)
Pomerania	Klaudia Ligenza	22	175 cm (5 ft 9 in)
Pomerania	Magdalena Drapella	25	174 cm (5 ft 8.5 in)
Silesia	Daniela Szewczyk	23	173 cm (5 ft 8 in)
Silesia	Paulina Basek	21	168 cm (5 ft 6 in)
Subcarpathia	Klaudia Mendyka	24	176 cm (5 ft 9 in)
Subcarpathia	Sandra Guzek	24	175 cm (5 ft 9 in)
West Pomerania	Karolina Malina	25	179 cm (5 ft 10.5 in)

== Notes ==
=== Returns ===
- Last competed in 2018:
  - Subcarpathia
- Last competed in 2019:
  - Lower Silesia
  - Podlaskie

=== Withdrawals ===
Polish Community in Germany

=== Did not compete ===
- Holy Cross
- Lubusz
- Opole
- Warmia-Masuria
- Polish Community in Argentina
- Polish Community in Australia
- Polish Community in Belarus
- Polish Community in Brazil
- Polish Community in Canada
- Polish Community in Czechia
- Polish Community in France
- Polish Community in Ireland
- Polish Community in Israel
- Polish Community in Kazakhstan
- Polish Community in Lithuania
- Polish Community in Russia
- Polish Community in Slovakia
- Polish Community in South Africa
- Polish Community in Sweden
- Polish Community in Ukraine
- Polish Community in the U.K.
- Polish Community in the U.S.
- Polish Community in Venezuela
