= Miss Polonia 2011 =

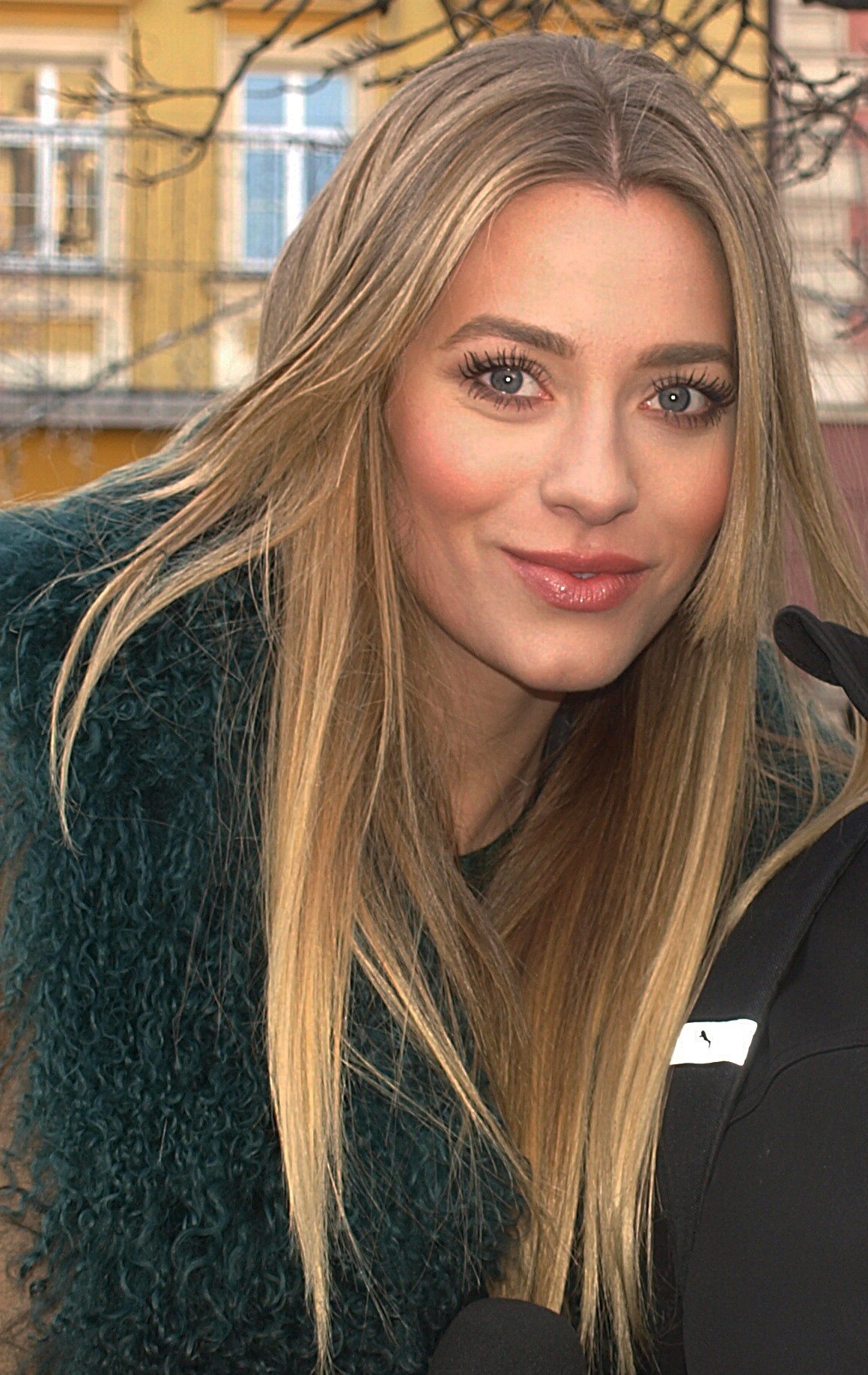
- Marcelina Zawadzka in 2015
- Date: December 9, 2011
- Presenters: Tomasz Kammel
- Entertainment: Maciej Maleńczuk; Ray Wilson; Chemia
- Venue: "Matecznik - Mazowsze" Folklore Center, Karolin
- Broadcaster: TVP
- Entrants: 18
- Placements: 12
- Returns: Lubusz; Warmia-Masuria
- Winner: Marcelina Zawadzka; Pomerania

Miss Polonia 2011 was the 37th Miss Polonia pageant, held at the "Matecznik - Mazowsze" Folklore Center in Karolin, Poland, on December 9, 2011.

The winner was Marcelina Zawadzka of Pomerania and she represented Poland in Miss Universe 2012. Top 8 finalist, Justyna Rajczyk represented Poland in Miss Earth 2012.

== Results ==
=== Placements ===
Placement	Contestant
Miss Polonia 2011	Pomerania – Marcelina Zawadzka
1st Runner-Up	Kuyavia-Pomerania – Anna Krupa
2nd Runner-Up	Lesser Poland – Marcela Chmielowska
Top 8	Holy Cross – Dominika Kubacka; Lubusz – Justyna Rajczyk (later named Miss Earth Poland 2012); Opole – Magdalena Myczewska; Podlasie – Benita Poniatowska; Silesia – Agnieszka Śleziak
Top 12	Łódź – Beata Stelmaszczyk; Lublin – Sylwia Toczyńska; Subcarpathia – Marcelina Firszt; West Pomerania – Katarzyna Grynfelder

=== Special awards ===
Award	Contestant
Miss Internet	Łódź – Beata Stelmaszczyk

== Judges ==
- Rozalia Mancewicz - Miss Polonia 2010
- Elżbieta Wierzbicka - President of the Miss Polonia Office
- Kacper Kuszewski - Actor
- Adam Woronowicz - Actor
- Radosław Pazura - Actor

== Official Delegates ==
Represents	Candidate	Age	Height
Greater Poland	Anna Wojtkiewicz	24	178 cm (5 ft 10 in)
Holy Cross	Dominika Kubacka	19	174 cm (5 ft 8.5 in)
Kuyavia-Pomerania	Anna Krupa	23	181 cm (5 ft 11 in)
Lesser Poland	Marcela Chmielowska	20	175 cm (5 ft 9 in)
Łódź	Beata Stelmaszczyk	24	176 cm (5 ft 9 in)
Lower Silesia	Justyna Grochala	20	175 cm (5 ft 9 in)
Lublin	Sylwia Toczyńska	20	174 cm (5 ft 8.5 in)
Lubusz	Justyna Rajczyk	19	173 cm (5 ft 8 in)
Masovia	Aleksandra Cielemęcka	20	174 cm (5 ft 8.5 in)
Masovia	Anna Szczygielska	22	174 cm (5 ft 8.5 in)
Opole	Magdalena Myczewska	19	176 cm (5 ft 9 in)
Podlasie	Benita Poniatowska	19	172 cm (5 ft 7.5 in)
Pomerania	Marcelina Zawadzka	22	180 cm (5 ft 11 in)
Silesia	Agnieszka Śleziak	18	183 cm (6 ft 0 in)
Subcarpathia	Marcelina Firszt	22	170 cm (5 ft 7 in)
Warmia-Masuria	Mariola Rysik	20	175 cm (5 ft 9 in)
West Pomerania	Katarzyna Grynfelder	21	174 cm (5 ft 8.5 in)
Polish Community in Lithuania	Agata Jachimowicz	19	174 cm (5 ft 8.5 in)

== Notes ==
=== Returns ===
Last competed in 2009:

- Lubusz
- Warmia-Masuria

=== Did not compete ===
- Polish Community in Argentina
- Polish Community in Australia
- Polish Community in Belarus
- Polish Community in Brazil
- Polish Community in Canada
- Polish Community in France
- Polish Community in Germany
- Polish Community in Ireland
- Polish Community in Israel
- Polish Community in Russia
- Polish Community in South Africa
- Polish Community in Sweden
- Polish Community in the U.K.
- Polish Community in the U.S.
- Polish Community in Venezuela
