= Miss Polonia 2020 =

43rd Miss Polonia pageant

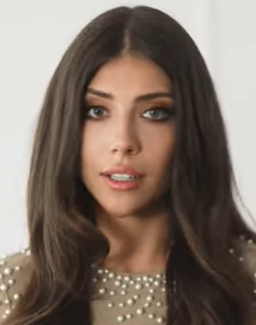
- Gryglewska in 2022
- Date: March 8, 2021
- Presenters: Karolina Bielawska; Conrado Moreno
- Entertainment: Marcin Sójka; Krystian Ochman; Alicja Szemplińska
- Venue: Arche Hotel Krakowska, Warsaw, Masovia, Poland
- Broadcaster: viviCAM.tv live
- Entrants: 20
- Placements: 10
- Withdrawals: Lower Silesia; Podlasie; Warmia-Masuria; Polish Community in Lithuania
- Returns: Pomerania; Polish Community in Germany
- Winner: Natalia Gryglewska; Silesia

Miss Polonia 2020 was the 43rd Miss Polonia pageant, held on March 8, 2021. The winner was Natalia Gryglewska of Silesia. Gryglewska represented Poland in Miss Grand International 2022 but unplaced. This years pageants was originally slated for November 2020 but was postponed to March 2021 due to the COVID-19 pandemic.

== Results ==
=== Placements ===
Placement	Contestant	International Placement
Miss Polonia 2020	Silesia – Natalia Gryglewska	Unplaced – Miss Grand International 2022
1st Runner-Up	Kuyavia-Pomerania – Klaudia Wonatowska	Top 21 – Miss United Nations 2022
2nd Runner-Up	Kuyavia-Pomerania – Faustyna Wespińska	Unplaced – Miss Intercontinental 2021
Top 5	Łódź – Roksana Karolak; Masovia – Jessica Guzek	
Top 10	Łódź – Klaudia Plesiak; Masovia – Dominika Oleszko; Masovia – Natalia Tarasiuk; Masovia – Weronika Domagalska; West Pomeranian - Amelia Trochimczuk	

=== Special awards ===
Award	Contestant
Beauty with a Purpose	Masovia – Weronika Domagalska
Miss Collibre	Greater Poland – Aleksandra Mróz
Miss Delia Cosmetics	Kuyavia-Pomerania – Klaudia Wonatowska
Miss Gorsenia	Masovia – Weronika Domagalska
Miss Public Vote	Masovia – Jessica Guzek

== Jury ==
The jury (judging panel) consisted of:

- Jagoda Piątek-Włodarczyk - Chairwoman
- Magda Pieczonka
- Agnieszka Kaczorowska-Pela
- Katarzyna Cichopek
- Marcin Hakiel
- Sylwia Romaniuk
- Aleksandra Stajszczak
- Tomasz Ciachorowski
- Mariusz Kałamaga
- Agata Biernat - Miss Polonia 2017

== Finalists ==
Represents	Candidate	Age	Height
Greater Poland	Aleksandra Mróz	21	177 cm (5 ft 9.5 in)
Greater Poland	Paulina Sokowicz	21	177 cm (5 ft 9.5 in)
Kuyavia-Pomerania	Faustyna Wespińska	24	175 cm (5 ft 9 in)
Kuyavia-Pomerania	Klaudia Wonatowska	23	172 cm (5 ft 7.5 in)
Kuyavia-Pomerania	Monika Przybył	21	179 cm (5 ft 10.5 in)
Łódź	Justyna Jarczewska	19	180 cm (5 ft 11 in)
Łódź	Klaudia Plesiak	22	173 cm (5 ft 8 in)
Łódź	Roksana Karolak	22	173 cm (5 ft 8 in)
Lublin	Agata Jarosz	23	172 cm (5 ft 7.5 in)
Masovia	Dominika Oleszko	26	174 cm (5 ft 8.5 in)
Masovia	Jessica Guzek	22	171 cm (5 ft 7 in)
Masovia	Katarzyna Gwiazda	25	175 cm (5 ft 9 in)
Masovia	Maja Biskupska	25	171 cm (5 ft 7 in)
Masovia	Natalia Tarasiuk	22	173 cm (5 ft 8 in)
Masovia	Weronika Domagalska	25	172 cm (5 ft 7.5 in)
Pomerania	Daria Szwaba	20	172 cm (5 ft 7.5 in)
Silesia	Natalia Gryglewska	22	173 cm (5 ft 8 in)
Silesia	Wiktoria Solecka	20	172 cm (5 ft 7.5 in)
West Pomerania	Amelia Trochimczuk	19	165 cm (5 ft 5 in)
Polish Community in Germany	Cindy Baranowska	20	184 cm (6 ft 0 in)

== Notes ==
=== Withdrawals ===
- Lower Silesia
- Podlasie
- Warmia-Masuria
- Polish Community in Lithuania

=== Returns ===
Last competed in 2006:

- Polish Community in Germany

Last competed in 2018:

- Pomerania

=== Did not compete ===
- Holy Cross
- Lesser Poland
- Lubusz
- Opole
- Subcarpathia
- Polish Community in Argentina
- Polish Community in Australia
- Polish Community in Belarus
- Polish Community in Brazil
- Polish Community in Canada
- Polish Community in Czechia
- Polish Community in France
- Polish Community in Ireland
- Polish Community in Israel
- Polish Community in Kazakhstan
- Polish Community in Russia
- Polish Community in Slovakia
- Polish Community in South Africa
- Polish Community in Sweden
- Polish Community in Ukraine
- Polish Community in the U.K.
- Polish Community in the U.S.
- Polish Community in Venezuela
