= Miss Polonia 2019 =

2019 edition of the Miss Polonia pageant

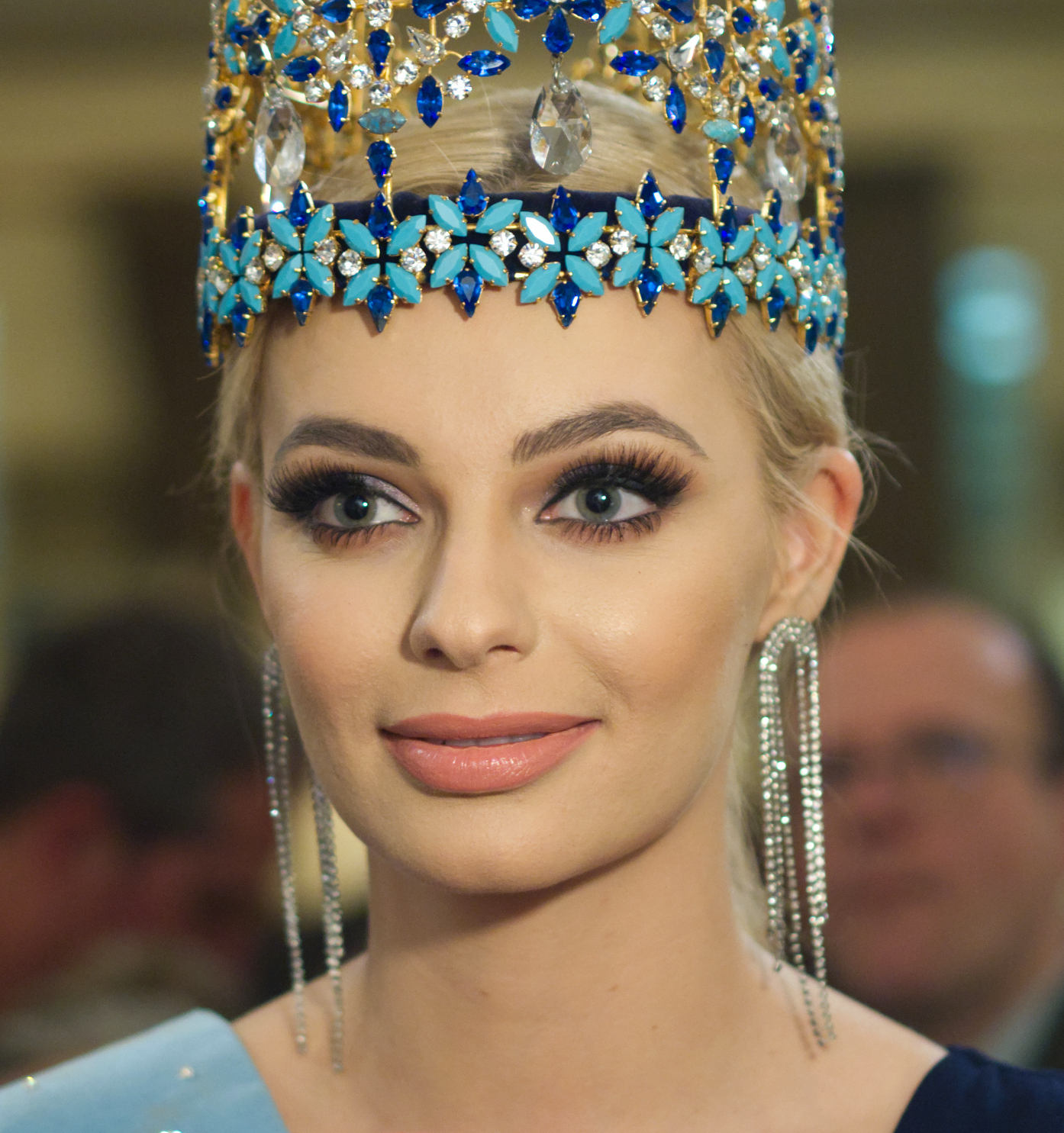
- Bielawska as Miss World 2021
- Date: November 24, 2019
- Presenters: Marcelina Zawadzka; Mateusz Hładki
- Entertainment: Tre Voci
- Venue: Hotel Narvil Conference & Spa, Serock
- Entrants: 20
- Placements: 5
- Withdrawals: Lesser Poland; Pomerania; Subcarpathia
- Returns: Lower Silesia; Podlasie; West Pomerania
- Winner: Karolina Bielawska; Łódź

Miss Polonia 2019 was the 42nd Miss Polonia pageant, held on November 24, 2019. The winner of Miss Polonia was Karolina Bielawska of Łódź and she represented Poland at Miss World 2021 and became the second woman from Poland to be crowned Miss World. The 1st Runner-up, Aleksandra Kielan, will represent the country at Miss Charm 2020. 2nd Runner-Up, Karina Nowak, was supposed to represent the country in Miss Grand International 2020 but did not compete for unknown reasons.

== Results ==
=== Placements ===
Placement	Contestant	International Placement
Miss Polonia 2019	Łódź – Karolina Bielawska	Winner – Miss World 2021
1st Runner-Up	Silesia – Aleksandra Kielan	Withdrew – Miss Charm 2023
2nd Runner-Up	Silesia – Karina Nowak	Withdrew – Miss Grand International 2020
Top 5	Łódź – Justyna Marczewska; Masovia – Aleksandra Gronowska	

=== Special awards ===
Award	Contestant
Miss Public Vote	Łódź – Karolina Bielawska
Miss Sports	Silesia – Aleksandra Kielan

== Official Delegates ==
Represents	Candidate	Age	Height
Greater Poland	Jesika Kubiak	21	170 cm (5 ft 7 in)
Kuyavia-Pomerania	Karina Tryba	21	171 cm (5 ft 7 in)
Łódź	Karolina Bielawska	20	179 cm (5 ft 10 in)
Łódź	Izabela Depta	25	173 cm (5 ft 8 in)
Łódź	Kinga Sęk	23	174 cm (5 ft 9 in)
Łódź	Justyna Marczewska	23	175 cm (5 ft 9 in)
Łódź	Iwetta Baran	25	183 cm (6 ft 0 in)
Lower Silesia	Marcelina Urbańska	19	178 cm (5 ft 10 in)
Lublin	Beata Sierpińska	25	179 cm (5 ft 10 in)
Masovia	Klaudia Kroczek	22	165 cm (5 ft 5 in)
Masovia	Patrycja Gołda	21	178 cm (5 ft 10 in)
Masovia	Aleksandra Gronowska	24	180 cm (5 ft 11 in)
Podlasie	Kinga Zabielska	21	176 cm (5 ft 9 in)
Silesia	Milena Bilska	20	171 cm (5 ft 7 in)
Silesia	Patrycja Brudkiewicz	24	173 cm (5 ft 8 in)
Silesia	Aleksandra Kielan	21	176 cm (5 ft 9 in)
Silesia	Karina Nowak	22	182 cm (6 ft 0 in)
Warmia-Masuria	Milena Jaworska	22	180 cm (5 ft 11 in)
West Pomerania	Kamila Wasilewska	24	178 cm (5 ft 10 in)
Polish Community in Lithuania	Dominika Lamauskaité	19	175 cm (5 ft 9 in)

== Notes ==
=== Returns ===
Last competed in 2016:

- Podlasie

Last competed in 2017:

- Lower Silesia
- West Pomerania

=== Withdrawals ===
- Lesser Poland
- Pomerania
- Subcarpathia

=== Did not compete ===
- Holy Cross
- Lubusz
- Opole
- Polish Community in Argentina
- Polish Community in Australia
- Polish Community in Belarus
- Polish Community in Brazil
- Polish Community in Canada
- Polish Community in Czechia
- Polish Community in France
- Polish Community in Germany
- Polish Community in Ireland
- Polish Community in Israel
- Polish Community in Kazakhstan
- Polish Community in Russia
- Polish Community in Slovakia
- Polish Community in South Africa
- Polish Community in Sweden
- Polish Community in Ukraine
- Polish Community in the U.K.
- Polish Community in the U.S.
- Polish Community in Venezuela
