= Miss World Poland =

- Formation: 2015
- Type: Beauty pageant
- Headquarters: Warsaw
- Location: Poland
- Members: Miss World
- Official language: Polish
- President: Miss Polonia
- Website: Official website

Miss World Poland is a national Beauty pageant in Poland to select the official ambassador of Poland at the Miss World pageant.

== Titleholders ==
| Year | Miss World Poland | 1st Runner-Up | 2nd Runner-Up |
|---|---|---|---|
| 2016 | Kaja Klimkiewicz | Paulina Mękal | Klaudia Rekosz |
| 2015 | Marta Pałucka | Natalia Tomczyk | Katarzyna Włodarek |

== Big Four pageants representatives ==
=== Miss World Poland ===
Color key

- Declared as Winner
- Ended as runner-up
- Ended as one of the finalists or semifinalists

| Year | Miss Polonia | Hometown | Placement | Special Awards |
|---|---|---|---|---|
| 2025 | Maja Klajda | Łęczna | 2nd Runner-Up | Miss World Europe |
| 2024 | No competition held | | | |
| 2023 | Krystyna Sokołowska | Białystok | Unplaced | |
| 2021 | Karolina Bielawska | Łódź | Miss World 2021 | Miss World Top Model (Top 13) |
| ~~2020~~ | Due to the impact of COVID-19 pandemic, no pageant in 2020 | | | |
| 2019 | Milena Sadowska | Oświęcim | Top 40 | Miss World Top Model (Top 40) |
| 2018 | Agata Biernat | Zduńska Wola | Unplaced | Miss World Talent (3rd runner-up), Miss World Top Model (Top 32), Miss World Sport (Top 24) |
Miss Polski
| 2017 | Magdalena Bieńkowska | Mikołajki | Top 40 | Miss World Top Model (Top 30) |
Miss World Poland
| 2016 | Kaja Klimkiewicz | Glinojeck | Unplaced | Miss World Talent (Top 21) |
| 2015 | Marta Kaja Pałucka | Sopot | Top 20 | Miss World Top Model (Top 30), Best in Interview (Top 12) |
Miss Polski
| 2014 | Ada Sztajerowska | Piotrków Trybunalski | Unplaced | |
| 2013 | Katarzyna Krzeszowska | Krynica-Zdrój | Unplaced | |
| 2012 | Weronika Szmajdzińska | Szczecin | Unplaced | Miss World Top Model (1st Runner-up) |
| 2011 | Angelika Natalia Ogryzek | Szczecin | Unplaced | |
| 2010 | Agata Szewiola | Żary | Unplaced | |
| 2009 | Anna Jamróz | Rumia | Top 16 | |
| 2008 | Klaudia Maria Ungerman | Wysieradz | Unplaced | |
| 2007 | Karolina Zakrzewska | Zielona Góra | Unplaced | |
Miss Polonia
| 2006 | Marzena Cieslik | Wolin | Unplaced | Miss World Beach Beauty (Top 10) |
| 2005 | Malwina Ratajczak | Warsaw | Unplaced | |
| 2004 | Katarzyna Weronika Borowicz | Ostrów Wielkopolski | Top 5 (3rd Runner-Up) | Miss World Top Model (Top 20) |
| 2003 | Karolina Gorazda | Warsaw | Unplaced | Miss World Beach Beauty (Top 10) |
| 2002 | Marta Matyjasik | Warsaw | Unplaced | |
| 2001 | Joanna Drozdowska | Warsaw | Unplaced | |
| 2000 | Justyna Bergmann | Warsaw | Unplaced | |
| 1999 | Marta Kwiecien | Warsaw | Unplaced | |
| 1998 | Izabela Opechowska | Warsaw | Unplaced | |
| 1997 | Roksana Jonek | Warsaw | Unplaced | |
| 1996 | Agnieszka Zielinska | Warsaw | Unplaced | |
| 1995 | Ewa Jzabella Tylecka | Warsaw | Unplaced | |
| 1994 | Jadwiga Flank | Bielsko-Biała | Unplaced | |
| 1993 | Alexandra Spieczynska | Wrocław | Unplaced | |
| 1992 | Ewa Wachowicz | Kraków | Top 5 (3rd Runner-Up) | |
| 1991 | Karina Wojciechowska | Katowice | Unplaced | |
Miss Polski
| 1990 | Ewa Maria Szymczak | Warsaw | Top 10 | |
Miss Polonia
| 1989 | Aneta Kręglicka | Gdańsk | Miss World 1989 | |
| 1988 | Joanna Gapinska | Szczecin | Unplaced | |
| 1987 | Monika Ewa Nowosadko | Kołobrzeg | Top 6 (3rd Runner-Up) | |
| 1986 | Renata Fatla | Bielsko-Biała | Unplaced | |
| 1985 | Katarzyna Dorota Zawidzka | Gorzów Wielkopolski | Top 15 | |
| 1984 | Magdalena Jaworska | Warsaw | Unplaced | |
| 1983 | Lidia Wasiak | Szczecin | Unplaced | |

== See also ==
- Miss Polski
- Miss Polonia
- Miss Earth Poland
