= Miss Polonia 2000 =

- Date: 14 October 2000
- Presenters: Jacek Borkowski
- Entertainment: Andrzej Piaseczny; Renata Dąbkowska; Tytus Wojnowicz
- Venue: Provincial Culture Center, Kielce
- Entrants: 20
- Placements: 3
- Winner: Justyna Bergmann; Kuyavia-Pomerania

Miss Polonia 2000 was the 26th Miss Polonia pageant, held at the Provincial Culture Center in Kielce, Poland, on October 14, 2000.

The winner was Justyna Bergmann of Kuyavia-Pomerania and she represented Poland in Miss World 2000. 1st Runner-Up Malgorzata Rozniecka represented Poland at Miss International 2001. 2nd Runner-Up Monika Gruda represented the country at Miss Universe 2001.

== Results ==
=== Placements ===
Placement	Contestant
Miss Polonia 2000	Kuyavia-Pomerania – Justyna Bergmann
1st Runner-Up	West Pomerania – Małgorzata Rożniecka
2nd Runner-Up	Masovia – Monika Gruda

=== Special awards ===
Award	Contestant
Miss Elegance	Warmia-Masuria – Justyna Kordek
Miss Internet	West Pomerania – Malgorzata Rozniecka
Miss Photogenic	Kuyavia-Pomerania – Justyna Bergmann
Miss Public Vote	Silesia – Agnieszka Radomska

== Contestants ==
Represents	Candidate	Age	Height
Kuyavia-Pomerania	Izabella Sochańska	22	172 cm (5 ft 7.5 in)
Kuyavia-Pomerania	Justyna Bergmann	18	173 cm (5 ft 8 in)
Łódź	Agnieszka Kuśmirek	22	174 cm (5 ft 8.5 in)
Łódź	Małgorzata Dąbkowska	20	176 cm (5 ft 9 in)
Lublin	Agata Oniszczuk	19	178 cm (5 ft 10 in)
Lublin	Agnieszka Brykowska	21	172 cm (5 ft 7.5 in)
Lublin	Justyna Rudzka	19	172 cm (5 ft 7.5 in)
Masovia	Agnieszka Major	18	180 cm (5 ft 11 in)
Masovia	Dorota Pitoń	22	177 cm (5 ft 9.5 in)
Masovia	Katarzyna Zych	22	176 cm (5 ft 9 in)
Masovia	Monika Gruda	19	179 cm (5 ft 10.5 in)
Podlaskie	Kamila Rasteńska	18	176 cm (5 ft 9 in)
Pomerania	Barbara Tomala	19	173 cm (5 ft 8 in)
Silesia	Agnieszka Radomska	19	174 cm (5 ft 8.5 in)
Subcarpathia	Katarzyna Skibowska	19	174 cm (5 ft 8.5 in)
Warmia-Masuria	Joanna Bekisz	19	175 cm (5 ft 9 in)
Warmia-Masuria	Justyna Kordek	22	175 cm (5 ft 9 in)
Warmia-Masuria	Kinga Kuczyńska	19	177 cm (5 ft 9.5 in)
Warmia-Masuria	Paulina Wodzikowska	19	181 cm (5 ft 11 in)
West Pomerania	Malgorzata Rozniecka	22	178 cm (5 ft 10 in)

== Notes ==
=== Did not compete ===
- Greater Poland
- Holy Cross
- Lesser Poland
- Lower Silesia
- Lubusz
- Opole
- Polish Community in Argentina
- Polish Community in Australia
- Polish Community in Belarus
- Polish Community in Brazil
- Polish Community in Canada
- Polish Community in France
- Polish Community in Germany
- Polish Community in Ireland
- Polish Community in Israel
- Polish Community in Lithuania
- Polish Community in Russia
- Polish Community in South Africa
- Polish Community in Sweden
- Polish Community in the U.K.
- Polish Community in the U.S.
- Polish Community in Venezuela
