= Miss Polonia =

Beauty pageant

Miss Polonia Organization
- Formation: 1927
- Type: Beauty pageant
- Headquarters: Warsaw
- Location: Poland
- Members: Miss Universe; Miss World; Miss International; Miss Earth; Miss Grand International; Miss Intercontinental; Miss Charm
- Official language: Polish
- Website: www.misspolonia.com.pl

Miss Polonia is a national beauty pageant in Poland to select the official ambassador of Poland at the Miss Universe, Miss World, Miss International, Miss Earth, Miss Grand International, Miss Intercontinental, and Miss Charm pageants. This pageant is the oldest beauty pageant in Poland.

== History ==
Starting in 1927, winners entering Miss Europe. Traditionally, the winner of Miss Polonia represented Poland in Miss World and Miss Universe.

The 1984 Miss Polonia competition ran into multiple problems with rigging accusations. Such accusations were made before the event, which led to a boycott. More controversy followed when Joanna Karska was initially chosen as the winner of the competition. The final vote was done a second time and Magdalena Jaworska ended up being declared the winner.

In the 1987 edition of the competition, there was more controversy. The winner of the competition, Monika Nowosadko, came in first place with the 10 male judges and came in last place with the 5 female judges

In 2007, Miss World took away the franchise from Miss Polonia and returned it to the non-related national contest Miss Polski. Since then, the winners of Miss Polonia represent Poland in Miss Universe and the runner-ups represent Poland in Miss Europe, Miss International, Miss Earth and Miss Baltic Sea. The Miss Europe and the Miss Baltic Sea pageants get discontinued in 2007 and 2008 respectively and as a result the winners and runners-up represent the country in Miss Universe, Miss International and Miss Earth.

Since 2015, Miss Polonia lost franchises of Miss Earth and Miss International. Up to now it has only sent its winner to the Miss Universe pageant.

In 2016 after 3 years break, Miss Polonia pageant is back and new titleholder will be selected in October. Winner will represent Poland in Miss Universe 2016.

In 2018 the Miss Polonia is officially owning the franchise of Miss Universe, Miss World and Miss Grand International.

In 2019 Miss Polonia franchised the Miss Intercontinental pageant and relinquished its franchise for Miss Universe, after that, the Miss Universe franchise went to Miss Polski.

In 2020, Miss Polonia franchised the Miss Charm license.

After 7 years, Miss Polonia holds the Miss Earth franchise in 2022.

After 6 years, Miss Polonia holds the Miss Universe franchise in 2025.

== Titleholders ==
Note: contest not held in 1931, 1933–1956, 1959–1982, 2014-2015.
1932, 1934 and 1937 winners selected in France to represent Poland in Miss Europe.

Year	Miss Polonia	Voivodeships	Notes
1927	Aniela Bogucka †	Warsaw, Masovia	
1929	Władysława Kostakówna †	Warsaw, Masovia	
1930	Zofia Batycka †	Lwów, Lwów***	
1932	Zofia Dobrowolska †	Poznań, Greater Poland	
1934	Maria Żabkiewiczówna †	Wilno, Wilno****	
1937	Józefina Kaczmarkiewicz †	Warsaw, Masovia	
1957	Alicja Bobrowska †	Kraków, Lesser Poland	
1958	Zuzanna Cembrowska †	Warsaw, Masovia	
1983	Lidia Wasiak	Szczecin, West Pomerania	
1984	Magdalena Jaworska †	Warsaw, Masovia	
1985	Katarzyna Zawidzka	Gorzów Wielkopolski, Lubusz	
1986	Renata Fatla	Bielsko-Biała, Silesia	
1987	Monika Nowosadko	Kołobrzeg, West Pomerania	
1988	Joanna Gapińska	Szczecin, West Pomerania	
1989	Aneta Kręglicka	Gdańsk, Pomerania	Miss World 1989
1990	Joanna Michalska	Warsaw, Masovia	
1991	Karina Wojciechowska	Mysłowice, Silesia	
1992	Ewa Wachowicz	Klęczany, Lesser Poland	World Miss University 1993
1993	Aleksandra Spieczyńska	Wrocław, Lower Silesia	
1994	Jadwiga Flank	Bielsko-Biała, Silesia	
1995	Ewa Tylecka	Dzierżoniów, Lower Silesia	
1996	Agnieszka Zielińska	Poznań, Greater Poland	
1997	Roksana Jonek	Mikołów, Silesia	Miss Tourism International 1998
1998	Izabela Opęchowska	Biskupiec, Warmia-Masuria	
1999	Marta Kwiecień	Lublin, Lublin	
2000	Justyna Bergmann	Grudziądz, Kuyavia-Pomerania	
2001	Joanna Drozdowska	Szczecin, West Pomerania	
2002	Marta Matyjasik	Zgorzelec, Lower Silesia	
2003	Karolina Gorazda	Kraków, Lesser Poland	
2004	Katarzyna Borowicz	Ostrów Wielkopolski, Greater Poland	
2005	Malwina Ratajczak	Krapkowice, Opole	Miss Baltic Sea 2006
2006	Marzena Cieślik	Wolin, West Pomerania	Poland hosted Miss World 2006
2007	Barbara Tatara	Łódź, Łódź	
2008	Angelika Jakubowska	Lubań, Lower Silesia	
2009	Maria Nowakowska	Legnica, Lower Silesia	
2010	Rozalia Mancewicz	Białystok, Podlasie	
2011	Marcelina Zawadzka	Malbork, Pomerania	
2012	Paulina Krupińska	Warsaw, Masovia	
2016	Izabella Krzan	Olsztyn, Warmia-Masuria	
2017	Agata Biernat	Zduńska Wola, Łódź	
2018	Milena Sadowska	Babice, Oświęcim, Lesser Poland	
2019	Karolina Bielawska	Łódź, Łódź	Miss World 2021
2020	Natalia Gryglewska	Częstochowa, Silesia	
2022	Krystyna Sokołowska	Białystok, Podlasie	
2023	Ewa Jakubiec	Wrocław, Lower Silesia	
2024	Maja Klajda	Łęczna, Lublin	
2025	Maja Todd	Katowice, Silesia	
2026	TBA	TBA	

=== Winners by Voivodeships ===
Voivodeships	Titles	Year(s)
Masovia	7	1927, 1929, 1937, 1958, 1984, 1990, 2012
Silesia	6	1986, 1991, 1994, 1997, 2020, 2025
Lower Silesia	6	1993, 1995, 2002, 2008, 2009, 2023
Lesser Poland	5	1956, 1957, 1992, 2003, 2018
West Pomerania	5	1983, 1987, 1988, 2001, 2006
Łódź	3	2007, 2017, 2019
Greater Poland	3	1932, 1996, 2004
Lublin	2	1999, 2024
Podlasie	2	2010, 2022
Warmia-Masuria	2	1998, 2016
Pomerania	2	1989, 2011
Opole	1	2005
Kuyavia-Pomerania	1	2000
Lubusz	1	1985
Wilno****	1	1934
Lwów***	1	1930

- (***) As of 1991 Lwów or Lviv becomes part of the independent Ukraine.
- (****) The city of Wilno or Vilnius becomes part of Lithuania.

Voivodeships yet to win:

- Holy Cross
- Subcarpathia

== International competition ==
=== Miss Universe Poland ===
- : Declared as Winner
- : Ended as runner-up or top 5/6 qualification
- : Ended as one of the finalists or semifinalists
- : Ended as special awards winner

The main of Miss Polonia represents her country at Miss Universe. Since Miss Polonia is the only one who franchised the Miss Universe Organization, sometimes the organization designated the runner-up or contestant to be "Miss Universe Poland". From 2019 to 2024 the winner of Miss Polski competes at Miss Universe competition. Began 2025 Miss Polonia get back the franchise. On occasion, when the winner does not qualify (due to age) for either contest, a runner-up is sent.

Year	Voivodeship	Miss Polonia	Placement at Miss Universe	Special Awards
2026	–	Vivica Lewandowski	TBA	
2025	Opole	Emily Reng	Unplaced	
Miss Polski
2024	Greater Poland	Kasandra Zawal	Unplaced	
2023	Opole	Angelika Jurkowianiec	Unplaced	
2022	Łódź	Aleksandra Klepaczka	Unplaced	
2021	Łódź	Agata Wdowiak	Unplaced	
2020	Łódź	Natalia Piguła	Unplaced	
2019	West Pomerania	Olga Buława	Unplaced	Miss Congeniality
Miss Polonia
2018	Holy Cross	Magdalena Swat	Top 20	
2017	Łódź	Katarzyna Włodarek	Unplaced	
2016	Warmia-Masuria	Izabella Krzan	Unplaced	
2015	West Pomerania	Weronika Szmajdzińska	Unplaced	
2014	Lesser Poland	Marcela Chmielowska	Unplaced	
2013	Masovia	Paulina Krupińska	Unplaced	Miss Photogenic
2012	Pomerania	Marcelina Zawadzka	Top 16	
2011	Podlasie	Rozalia Mancewicz	Unplaced	
2010	Lower Silesia	Maria Nowakowska	Unplaced	
2009	Lower Silesia	Angelika Jakubowska	Unplaced	
2008	Łódź	Barbara Tatara	Unplaced	
2007	Masovia	Dorota Gawron	Unplaced	
2006	Masovia; Polish Community in Venezuela	Francys Mayela Barraza Sudnicka	Unplaced	
2005	Kuyavia-Pomerania	Marta Kossakowska	Unplaced	
2004	Subcarpathia	Paulina Panek	Unplaced	
2003	Holy Cross	Iwona Makuch	Unplaced	
2002	West Pomerania	Joanna Drozdowska	Unplaced	
2001	Masovia	Monika Gruda	Unplaced	
2000	Warmia-Masuria	Emilia Ewelina Raszynska	Unplaced	
1999	Lublin	Katarzyna Pakula	Unplaced	
1998	Pomerania	Sylwia Małgorzata Kupiec	Unplaced	
1997	Greater Poland	Agnieszka Zielińska	Unplaced	
1996	Pomerania	Monika Chróścicka-Wnętrzak	Unplaced	
1995	Silesia	Magdalena Pęcikiewicz	Unplaced	
1994	West Pomerania	Joanna Brykczyńska	Unplaced	
1993	Warmia-Masuria	Marzenna Wolska	Unplaced	
1992	Lublin	Izabela Filipowska	Unplaced	
1991	Masovia	Joanna Michalska	Unplaced	
1990	Łódź	Małgorzata Obieżalska	Unplaced	
1989	West Pomerania	Joanna Gapińska	3rd Runner-up	
Did not compete between 1987—1988
1986	Masovia	Brygida Elżbieta Bziukiewicz	3rd Runner-up	
1985	Lubusz	Katarzyna Zawidzka	Unplaced	
1984	Masovia	Joanna Karska	Unplaced	
Did not compete between 1960—1983
1959	Masovia	Zuzanna Cembrowska †	Top 16	
1958	Masovia	Alicja Bobrowska †	4th Runner-up	

=== Miss World Poland ===
- : Declared as Winner
- : Ended as runner-up or top 5/6 qualification
- : Ended as one of the finalists or semifinalists
- : Ended as special awards winner

Miss Polonia started to be franchise holder in 1983, from 1983 to 2007 the Miss Polonia was selecting the winner or runner-up to Miss World competition. From 2007 to 2014 the license of Miss World bought to Miss Polski and continued between 2015 and 2017 the Miss World Poland contest independently selected the winner to Miss World. Started in 2018 the Miss Polonia returned to be national franchise holder of Miss World.

Year	Voivodeship	Miss Polonia	Placement at Miss World	Special Awards
2027	TBA	TBA	TBA	
2026	Silesia	Maja Todd	Top 40	Miss World Talent (Top 21); Miss World Top Model (Top 60)
2025	Lubelskie	Maja Klajda	2nd Runner-Up	Miss World Talent (Top 48); Miss World Multimedia (Top 20)
2024	Lower Silesia	Ewa Jakubiec	No competition held, she allocated to Miss Earth 2023 and Miss International 2024	
2023	Podlasie	Krystyna Sokołowska	Unplaced	Miss World Talent (Top 23)
2022	Silesia	Natalia Gryglewska	Due to the impact of COVID-19 pandemic, no pageant in 2022, she allocated to Miss Grand International 2022	
2021	Łódź	Karolina Bielawska	Miss World 2021	Miss World Top Model (Top 13)
2020	Due to the impact of COVID-19 pandemic, no pageant in 2020			
2019	Lesser Poland	Milena Sadowska	Top 40	Miss World Top Model (Top 40)
2018	Łódź	Agata Biernat	Unplaced	Miss World Talent (3rd runner-up); Miss World Top Model (Top 32); Miss World Sport (Top 24)
Miss Polski
2017	Warmia-Masuria	Magdalena Bieńkowska	Top 40	Miss World Top Model (Top 30)
Miss World Poland
2016	Masovia	Kaja Klimkiewicz	Unplaced	Miss World Talent (Top 21)
2015	Pomerania	Marta Kaja Pałucka	Top 20	Miss World Top Model (Top 30)
Miss Polski
2014	Łódź	Ada Sztajerowska	Unplaced	
2013	Lesser Poland	Katarzyna Krzeszowska	Unplaced	
2012	West Pomerania	Weronika Szmajdzińska	Unplaced	Miss World Top Model (1st Runner-up)
2011	West Pomerania	Angelika Natalia Ogryzek	Unplaced	
2010	Lubusz	Agata Szewiola	Unplaced	
2009	Pomerania	Anna Jamróz	Top 16	
2008	West Pomerania	Klaudia Maria Ungerman	Unplaced	
2007	Lubusz	Karolina Zakrzewska	Unplaced	
Miss Polonia
2006	West Pomerania	Marzena Cieslik	Unplaced	Miss World Beach Beauty (Top 10)
2005	Opole	Malwina Ratajczak	Unplaced	
2004	Greater Poland	Katarzyna Weronika Borowicz	Top 5	Miss World Top Model (Top 20)
2003	Lesser Poland	Karolina Gorazda	Unplaced	Miss World Beach Beauty (Top 10)
2002	Lower Silesia	Marta Matyjasik	Unplaced	
2001	West Pomerania	Joanna Drozdowska	Unplaced	
2000	Kuyavian-Pomerania	Justyna Bergmann	Unplaced	
1999	Lublin	Marta Kwiecień	Unplaced	
1998	Warmia-Masuria	Izabela Opęchowska	Unplaced	
1997	Silesia	Roksana Jonek	Unplaced	
1996	Greater Poland	Agnieszka Zielinska	Unplaced	
1995	Lower Silesia	Ewa Jzabella Tylecka	Unplaced	
1994	Silesia	Jadwiga Flank	Unplaced	
1993	Lower Silesia	Alexandra Spieczynska	Unplaced	
1992	Lesser Poland	Ewa Wachowicz	Top 5	
1991	Silesia	Karina Wojciechowska	Unplaced	
Miss Polski
1990	Masovia	Ewa Maria Szymczak	Top 10	
Miss Polonia
1989	Pomerania	Aneta Kręglicka	Miss World 1989	
1988	West Pomerania	Joanna Gapinska	Unplaced	
1987	West Pomerania	Monika Ewa Nowosadko	Top 6	
1986	Silesia	Renata Fatla	Unplaced	
1985	Lubusz	Katarzyna Dorota Zawidzka	Top 15	
1984	Masovia	Magdalena Jaworska	Unplaced	
1983	West Pomerania	Lidia Wasiak	Unplaced	

=== Miss International Poland ===
- : Declared as Winner
- : Ended as runner-up or top 5/6 qualification
- : Ended as one of the finalists or semifinalists
- : Ended as special awards winner

In the beginning the winner of Miss Juwenaliów 1959 participated at Miss International. Since 1985 the Miss International Poland will be selected by Miss Polonia, Miss Polski or one of runners-up from Miss Polonia or Miss Polski pageant. As of 2015 Miss International franchise handled by Miss Polski Organization. Since 2024, Miss Polonia took back the Miss International franchise

Year	Voivodeship	Miss Polonia	Placement at Miss International	Special Awards
2026	Pomeranian	Savannah Gajda	TBA	
2025	Silesia	Maja Todd	Unplaced	
2024	Silesia	Ewa Jakubiec	Top 8	
Miss Polski
2023	Greater Poland	Julia Marcinkowska	Unplaced	
2022	Lublin	Sylwia Stasińska	Unplaced	
Due to the impact of COVID-19 pandemic, no competition held between 2020―2021
2019	Podlasie	Karina Szczepanek	Unplaced	
2018	Pomerania	Marta Kaja Pałucka	Unplaced	
2017	Masovia	Paulina Maziarz	Unplaced	
2016	Warmia-Masuria	Magdalena Bieńkowska	Top 15	
2015	Masovia	Ewa Mielnicka	Unplaced	
Miss Polonia
2014	Masovia	Zaneta Pludowska	Unplaced	
2013	Masovia	Katarzyna Oracka	Unplaced	
2012	Podlasie	Rozalia Mancewicz	Unplaced	
Polish Representative from Miss Polonia of Łódź Voivodeship
2011	Masovia	Adrianna Olga Wojciechowska	Unplaced	
Polish Representatives from Miss Polonia
2010	West Pomerania	Zaneta Sitko	Unplaced	
2009	Lower Silesia	Angelika Jakubowska	Unplaced	
2008	West Pomerania	Anna Maria Tarnowska	2nd Runner-up	
2007	Masovia	Dorota Gawron	Unplaced	
2006	Masovia	Marta Jakoniuk	Unplaced	
2005	Podlasie	Monika Szeroka	Unplaced	
2004	Masovia	Marta Matyjasik	Unplaced	
2003	Did not compete			
Miss Lata z Radiem
2002	Opole	Monika Angermann	Top 12	
Polish Representatives from Miss Polonia
2001	Warmia-Masuria	Malgorzata Rozniecka	Miss International 2001	
2000	Warmia-Masuria	Ewelina Raszynska	Unplaced	
Miss Lata z Radiem
1999	Kuyavia-Pomerania	Adrianna Gerczew	Top 12	
Polish Representatives from Miss Polonia
1998	Lublin	Agnieszka Osińska	Top 12	
1997	Pomerania	Agnieszka Beata Myko	Top 12	
1996	Silesia	Monika Marta Adamek	Unplaced	
1995	Did not compete			
1994	Kuyavia-Pomerania	Ilona Felicjanska	Unplaced	
Miss Polski
1993	Kuyavia-Pomerania	Agnieszka Pachalko	Miss International 1993	
1992	Silesia	Elzbieta Jadwiga Dziech	Unplaced	
1991	Lower Silesia	Agnieszka Kotlarska	Miss International 1991	
1990	Pomerania	Ewa Maria Szymczak	Top 10	
Miss Polonia
1989	West Pomerania	Aneta Kreglicka	1st Runner-up	
1988	Did not compete			
1987	West Pomerania	Monika Nowosadko	Unplaced	
1986	Silesia	Renata Fatla	Unplaced	
1985	Lubusz	Katarzyna Zawidzka	Top 15	
Miss Juwenaliów
Did not compete between 1961—1984, in 1966 No contest
1960	Lesser Poland	Marzena Malinowska	Top 15	

=== Miss Earth Poland ===
This list includes all Polish representatives from 2002 up to the present who have gone to compete at Miss Earth.

Color key

- Declared as Winner
- Ended as runner-up
- Ended as one of the finalists or semifinalists

Year	Voivodeship	Miss Earth Poland	National Title	Placement	Special Awards	Ref.
2025	Masovian	Justyna Roguska	Miss Polonia 2025 (2nd Runner-Up)	Top 12		
2024	Podlaskie	Julia Zawistowska	Miss Polonia 2024 (Top 5)	Top 20	Fans Vote Winner	
2023	Lower Silesia	Ewa Jakubiec	Miss Polonia 2023	Unplaced		
2022	Łódź	Julia Baryga	Miss Polonia 2022 (2nd Runner-Up)	Unplaced	(silver) Beach Wear (Air)	
Miss Earth Poland
Did not compete in 2021
2020	West Pomerania	Sabina Półtawska	Miss Earth Air Poland 2019	Top 8	(gold) Long Gown (Europe); (bronze) Resort Wear (Europe); JEWEL Beauty Strong Earth Ambassador (Top 15)	
2019	Podlasie	Krystyna Sokołowska	Miss Earth Poland 2019	Top 10	(gold) Swimsuit (Fire)	
2018	Warmia–Masuria	Aleksandra Grysz	Miss Earth Poland 2018	Unplaced	Beauty of Figure and Form Preliminary Round (Top 10)	
Miss Egzotica
2017	Greater Poland	Dominika Szymańska	Miss Egzotica 2017	Unplaced	(silver) Resorts Wear (Group 1); Figure and Form (Top 16)	
2016	Lublin	Magdalena Kucharska	Miss Egzotica 2016	Unplaced	Eco-Tourism & Environmental Conference (Team Europe)	
2015	Silesia	Magdalena Ho	Miss Egzotica 2014	Unplaced		
Miss Polonia
2014	Masovia	Patrycja Dorywalska	Miss Polonia 2012 (Top 5)	Unplaced	(bronze) Best Swimsuit	
2013	Masovia	Aleksandra Szczęsna	Miss Polonia 2012 (2nd Runner-Up)	Top 8	Miss Photogenic; Miss Broadway; Resorts Wear (Top 15)	
2012	Greater Poland	Justyna Rajczyk	Miss Polonia 2011 (Top 8)	Top 16		
2011	No Delegation					
2010	Masovia	Beata Polakowska	Miss Polonia 2009 (Top 5)	Unplaced		
2009	Łódź	Izabela Wilczek	Miss Polonia 2007 (Top 10)	Top 8		
2008	Łódź	Karolina Filipkowska	Miss Polonia 2008 (Top 5)	Top 16		
2007	Łódź	Barbara Tatara	Miss Polonia 2007	Unplaced		
2006	Masovia; Polish Community in Venezuela	Francys Sudnicka	Miss Polonia 2005 (Top 5)	Top 8		
2005	Greater Poland	Katarzyna Borowicz	Miss Polonia 2004	Miss Water (2nd Runner-Up)	Miss Pond's	
2004	Lesser Poland	Karolina Gorazda	Miss Polonia 2003	Top 16		
2003	Lower Silesia	Marta Matyjasik	Miss Polonia 2002	Miss Fire (3rd Runner-Up)		
Miss Polski
2002	West Pomerania	Agnieszka Portka	Miss Polski 1999 (Top 10)	Unplaced		

=== Miss Grand Poland ===
- : Declared as Winner
- : Ended as runner-up or top 5/6 qualification
- : Ended as one of the finalists or semifinalists
- : Ended as special awards winner

Miss Polonia acquired the franchise of Miss Grand International for Poland in 2018. Previously, from 2013 to 2016, the license belonged to another national pageant, Miss Polski.

Year	Voivodeship	Miss Grand Poland	Original national title	Placement
2025	Did not compete			
2024	Masovian	Aleksandra Wielogórska	Top 5 - Miss Polonia 2024	Unplaced
2023	Pomerania	Kornelia Gołębiewska	2nd runner-up Miss Polonia 2023	Unplaced
2022	Silesia	Natalia Gryglewska	Miss Polonia 2020	Unplaced
2021	Did not compete			
2020	Lesser Poland	Milena Sadowska	Miss Polonia 2018	Unplaced
2020	Silesia	Karina Nowak	2nd runner-up Miss Polonia 2019	Did not compete
2019	Łódź	Patrycja Woźniak	2nd runner-up Miss Polonia 2018	Unplaced
2018	West Pomerania	Malwina Ratajczyk	2nd runner-up Miss Polonia 2017	Unplaced
2017	Did not compete			
Polish representatives from Miss Polski
2016	Podlasie	Marta Redo	1st runner-up Miss Polski 2015	Unplaced
2015	Lesser Poland	Katarzyna Krzeszowska	Miss Polski 2012	Top 20
2014	West Pomerania	Angelika Ogryzek	Miss Polski 2011	Top 10
2013	Podlasie	Anna Moniuszko	Top 10 – Miss Polski 2012	Unplaced

=== Miss Charm Poland ===
- : Declared as Winner
- : Ended as runner-up or top 5/6 qualification
- : Ended as one of the finalists or semifinalists
- : Ended as special awards winner

Year	Voivodeship	Miss Polonia	Placement at Miss Charm International	Special Awards
2025	Greater Poland	Julia Łuczak	Unplaced	Best Face
2024	Greater Poland	Adrianna Maria Koperska	Unplaced	
2023	Lublin	Sylwia Bober	Top 20	

=== Miss Intercontinental Poland ===
- : Declared as Winner
- : Ended as runner-up or top 5/6 qualification
- : Ended as one of the finalists or semifinalists
- : Ended as special awards winner

Year	Voivodeship	Miss Polonia	Placement at Miss Intercontinental	Special Awards
2025	Masovian	Dominika Zak	Unplaced	
2024	Warmian-Masurian	Laura Brzezińska	Unplaced	
2023	Pomerania	Kornelia Gołębiewska	Top 22	Miss Popularity
2022	Kuyavia-Pomerania	Klaudia Andrzejewska	Unplaced	
2021	Kuyavia-Pomerania	Faustyna Wespińska	Unplaced	
2020	Due to the impact of COVID-19 pandemic, no pageant in 2020			
2019	Masovia	Martyna Górak	Unplaced	

== Past Franchises ==
=== Miss Europe Poland ===
- : Declared as Winner
- : Ended as runner-up or top 5/6 qualification
- : Ended as one of the finalists or semifinalists
- : Ended as special awards winner

The winner of Miss Polonia also competed in the Miss Europe pageant.

Year	Voivodeship	Miss Polonia	Placement at Miss Europe	Special Awards
2006	Greater Poland	Katarzyna Weronika Borowicz	3rd Runner-Up	
2005	Lesser Poland	Karolina Gorazda	Top 12	
2004	No contest in 2004			
2003	Lower Silesia	Marta Matyjasik	4th Runner-Up	Miss Photogenic
Miss Lata z Radiem
2002	Opole	Monika Angermann	Top 10	
2001	Kuyavia-Pomerania	Adriana Gerczew	1st Runner-Up	
Polish Representatives from Miss Polonia
2000	No contest in 2000			
1999	Greater Poland	Agnieszka Stolarczyk	Unplaced	
1998	No contest in 1998			
1997	Greater Poland	Agnieszka Zielinska	2nd Runner-up	
1996	Silesia	Agata Dworniczek	Unplaced	
1995	Silesia	Magdalena Pęcikiewicz	Unplaced	
1994	Greater Poland	Serafina Makowska	Unplaced	
Polish representatives from Miss Polski
1993	West Pomerania	Dorota Wrobel	Unplaced	
1992	Greater Poland	Jana Fabian	Unplaced	
1991	Masovia	Ewa Maria Szymczak	Top 13	
Polish representatives from Miss Polonia
1990	No contest in 1989 & 1990			
1989	No contest in 1989 & 1990			
1988	West Pomerania	Ewa Monika Nowosadko	1st Runner-Up	
1987	No contest in 1986 & 1987			
1986	No contest in 1986 & 1987			
1985	Masovia	Magdalena Jaworska	Unplaced	
1984	West Pomerania	Lidia Wasiak	Unplaced	
Did not compete between 1955 and 1982, no contest in 1975, 1977, 1979 & 1983
Polish representatives from Miss Polonia France
1954	Polish Community in France	Kazimiera Klimczak	Unplaced	
Polish representatives from Miss Polonia
Did not compete between 1938 and 1953, no contest between 1939 and 1947 due to World War II
1937	Masovia	Józefa Kaczmarkiewiczówna	Unplaced	
1936	Did not compete between 1935 & 1936			
1935	Did not compete between 1935 & 1936			
1934	Wilno***	Maria Zabkiewicz	Unplaced	
1933	Did not compete in 1933			
1932	Greater Poland	Zofia Dobrowolska	Unplaced	
1931	Did not compete in 1931			
1930	Lwów****	Zofia Batycka	Unplaced	
1929	Masovia	Władysława Kostakówna	1st Runner-Up	
1928	No contest in 1928			
1927	Masovia	Aniela Bogucka	1st Runner-Up	

- (***) The city of Wilno or Vilnius becomes part of the independent Lithuania.
- (****) As of 1991 Lwów or Lviv becomes part of the independent Ukraine.

== See also ==
- Miss Polski
- Miss World Poland
- Miss Earth Poland
