= Miss Earth Poland =

Polish beauty pageant

- Formation: 2002
- Type: Beauty Pageant
- Headquarters: Warsaw
- Location: Poland
- Members: Miss Earth
- Official language: Polish
- National Director: Francys Sudnicka (2018-2021)
- Website: missearthpoland.pl

Miss Earth Poland is a title given to a Polish woman who represents Poland at Miss Earth, which is an annual international beauty pageant promoting environmental awareness. The current franchise holder for Miss Earth in Poland is Miss Polonia, who was also the franchise holder for 13 years since 2002.

Poland has been one of the top performing countries in Miss Earth. As of its fourteenth year, Poland was able to produce eight placements including a Miss Fire (3rd Runner-up) in (2003) and a Miss Water (2nd Runner-up) in (2005).

== History ==
=== 2002-2014: Miss Polonia ===
Miss Polonia is a pageant responsible for sending delegates to Miss Universe and Miss International pageants. The Miss Earth Poland title was given to a runner up or an appointed contestant. However, from 2003 to 2007, Miss Polonia sent its main winner from the previous year with the exception in 2006 where they appointed the third runner up.

The last delegate for Miss Earth from Miss Polonia is Patrycja Dorywalska who was one of the top five finalists at Miss Polonia 2012.

=== 2015-2017: Showbiz and Miss Egzotica ===
Miss Egzotica is an annual pageant for Polish women who have multiracial roots. The pageant supports diversity to raise awareness in Poland. The pageant was awarded a European Medal by the BCC, European Economic and Social Committee in Brussels and the Ministry of Foreign Affairs.

=== 2018-2021: Miss Earth Poland ===
In 2018, the Miss Earth Organization authorized Francys Barraza-Sudnicka (Miss Universe Poland 2006 and Miss Earth Poland 2006) as the new national director and organizer of the newly established Miss Earth Poland pageant. However, in 2021, Miss Earth Poland was not able to send a representative for Miss Earth 2021 pageant.

=== 2022-present: Return to Miss Polonia ===
Carousel Productions gave the rights once again to Miss Polonia in sending a Polish delegate to Miss Earth beginning 2022. Miss Polonia appointed Julia Baryga from Łódź to compete for the 22nd edition of Miss Earth. Julia Baryga is the Miss Polonia 2022 2nd Runner-up.

== Titleholders ==
Year	Miss Earth Poland Elemental Court Titlists			
Year	Earth	Air	Water	Fire
2019	Krystyna Sokołowska	Sabina Połtawska	Milena Rokicka	Vanessa Wietrzyk
2018	Aleksandra Grysz	Karina Pochwala	Kaja Kimkiewicz	Sandra Staszewska
2017	Dominika Szymańska	Milena Rokicka	Ludwika Cichecka	Paulina Zaręba

== Representatives to Miss Earth ==
This list includes all Polish representatives from 2002 up to the present who have gone to compete at Miss Earth.

Color key

- Declared as Winner
- Ended as runner-up
- Ended as one of the finalists or semifinalists

Year	Miss Earth Poland	Hometown	National Title	Placement	Special Awards	Ref.
2024	Julia Zawistowska	Białystok	Miss Polonia 2024 (Top 5)	Top 20	Miss Popular Vote	
2023	Ewa Jakubiec	Wrocław	Miss Polonia 2023	Unplaced		
Miss Polonia
2022	Julia Baryga	Łódź	Miss Polonia 2022 (2nd Runner-Up)	Unplaced	(silver) Beach Wear (Air)	
Miss Earth Poland
Did not compete in 2021
2020	Sabina Półtawska	Szczecin	Miss Earth Air Poland 2019	Top 8	(gold) Long Gown (Europe); (bronze) Resort Wear (Europe); JEWEL Beauty Strong Earth Ambassador (Top 15)	
2019	Krystyna Sokołowska	Białystok	Miss Earth Poland 2019	Top 10	(gold) Swimsuit (Fire)	
2018	Aleksandra Grysz	Iława	Miss Earth Poland 2018	Unplaced	Beauty of Figure and Form Preliminary Round (Top 10)	
Miss Egzotica
2017	Dominika Szymańska	Poznań	Miss Egzotica 2017	Unplaced	(silver) Resorts Wear (Group 1); Figure and Form (Top 16)	
2016	Magdalena Kucharska	Brzozowa	Miss Egzotica 2016	Unplaced	Eco-Tourism & Environmental Conference (Team Europe)	
2015	Magdalena Ho	Sosnowiec	Miss Egzotica 2014	Unplaced		
Miss Polonia
2014	Patrycja Dorywalska	Warsaw	Miss Polonia 2012 (Top 5)	Unplaced	(bronze) Best Swimsuit	
2013	Aleksandra Szczęsna	Warsaw	Miss Polonia 2012 (2nd Runner-Up)	Top 8	Miss Photogenic; Miss Broadway; Resorts Wear (Top 15)	
2012	Justyna Rajczyk	Poznań	Miss Polonia 2011 (Top 8)	Top 16		
2011	No Delegation					
2010	Beata Polakowska	Ostrów Mazowiecka	Miss Polonia 2009 (Top 5)	Unplaced		
2009	Izabela Wilczek	Pabianice	Miss Polonia 2007 (Top 10)	Top 8		
2008	Karolina Filipkowska	Łódź	Miss Polonia 2008 (Top 5)	Top 16		
2007	Barbara Tatara	Łódź	Miss Polonia 2007	Unplaced		
2006	Francys Sudnicka	Valencia	Miss Polonia 2005 (Top 5)	Top 8		
2005	Katarzyna Borowicz	Ostrów Wielkopolski	Miss Polonia 2004	Miss Water (2nd Runner-Up)	Miss Pond's	
2004	Karolina Gorazda	Kraków	Miss Polonia 2003	Top 16		
2003	Marta Matyjasik	Zgorzelec	Miss Polonia 2002	Miss Fire (3rd Runner-Up)		
Miss Polski
2002	Agnieszka Portka	Szczecin	Miss Polski 1999 (Top 10)	Unplaced		

== See also ==
- Miss Polonia
- Miss Polski
- Miss World Poland
