= Miss Polonia 2018 =

- Date: 10 November 2018
- Presenters: Patricia Kazadi; Olivier Janiak
- Venue: Hotel Narvil Conference & Spa, Serock
- Entrants: 21
- Placements: 5
- Withdrawals: Holy Cross; Lower Silesia; Lubusz; West Pomerania
- Returns: Greater Poland; Kuyavia-Pomerania; Lesser Poland; Subcarpathia; Polish Community in Lithuania
- Winner: Milena Sadowska; Lower Poland

Miss Polonia 2018 was the 41st Miss Polonia pageant, held on 10 November 2018. The winner was Milena Sadowska of Lower Poland and she represented Poland in Miss World 2019 and Miss Grand International 2020. 1st Runner-Up Martyna Górak represented Poland at Miss Intercontinental 2019. 2nd Runner-Up Patrycja Woźniak presented the country at Miss Grand International 2019.

== Results ==
=== Placements ===
Placement	Contestant	International Placement
Miss Polonia 2018	Lesser Poland – Milena Sadowska	Top 40 – Miss World 2019
Miss Polonia 2018	Lesser Poland – Milena Sadowska	Unplaced – Miss Grand International 2020
1st Runner-Up	Masovia – Martyna Górak	Unplaced – Miss Intercontinental 2019
2nd Runner-Up	Łódź – Patrycja Woźniak	Unplaced – Miss Grand International 2019
Top 5	Masovia – Zuzanna Smaga; Pomerania – Sylwia Stasińska	

=== Special awards ===
Award	Contestant
Miss Public Vote	Pomerania – Sylwia Stasińska
Miss Personality	Subcarpathia – Karolina Grodzka
Miss Delia Cosmetics	Lesser Poland – Milena Sadowska
Miss Party	Pomerania – Sylwia Stasińska

== Contestants ==
Represents	Candidate	Age	Height
Greater Poland	Paulina Olszyna	24	176 cm (5 ft 9 in)
Kuyavia-Pomerania	Jesica Walecka	19	171 cm (5 ft 7 in)
Lesser Poland	Milena Sadowska	19	175 cm (5 ft 9 in)
Łódź	Magdalena Czech	23	178 cm (5 ft 10 in)
Łódź	Natalia Zawiślak	19	177 cm (5 ft 9.5 in)
Łódź	Patrycja Woźniak	19	173 cm (5 ft 8 in)
Lublin	Oliwia Fijałkowska	21	177 cm (5 ft 9.5 in)
Masovia	Aleksandra Pechal	18	181 cm (5 ft 11 in)
Masovia	Eliza Jakubowska	26	180 cm (5 ft 11 in)
Masovia	Magdalena Kaczmarzyk	22	173 cm (5 ft 8 in)
Masovia	Magdalena Karwacka	21	176 cm (5 ft 9 in)
Masovia	Martyna Górak	23	176 cm (5 ft 9 in)
Masovia	Weronika Karczewska	20	184 cm (6 ft 0 in)
Masovia	Zuzanna Smaga	21	176 cm (5 ft 9 in)
Pomerania	Agata Wąsacz	21	181 cm (5 ft 11 in)
Pomerania	Sylwia Stasińska	20	175 cm (5 ft 9 in)
Pomerania	Teresa Miglewicz	25	179 cm (5 ft 10.5 in)
Silesia	Natalia Uliasz	26	179 cm (5 ft 10.5 in)
Subcarpathia	Karolina Grodzka	21	184 cm (6 ft 0 in)
Warmia-Masuria	Karolina Urbańska	19	176 cm (5 ft 9 in)
Polish Community in Lithuania	Agata Dorodko	18	175 cm (5 ft 9 in)

== Notes ==
=== Returns ===
Last competed in 2011:

- Polish Community in Lithuania

Last competed in 2012:

- Greater Poland
- Subcarpathia

Last competed in 2016:

- Kuyavia-Pomerania
- Lesser Poland

=== Withdrawals ===
- Holy Cross
- Lower Silesia
- Lubusz
- West Pomerania

=== Did not compete ===
- Opole
- Podlasie
- Polish Community in Argentina
- Polish Community in Australia
- Polish Community in Belarus
- Polish Community in Brazil
- Polish Community in Canada
- Polish Community in France
- Polish Community in Germany
- Polish Community in Ireland
- Polish Community in Israel
- Polish Community in Russia
- Polish Community in South Africa
- Polish Community in Sweden
- Polish Community in the U.K.
- Polish Community in the U.S.
- Polish Community in Venezuela
