= Magdalena Swat =

Polish beauty pageant titleholder

- Born: Magdalena Powanskca Swat; 27 May 1991 (age 35); Warsaw, Poland
- Height: 1.73 m (5 ft 8 in)
- Beauty pageant titleholder
- Title: Miss Universe Poland 2018
- Hair color: Blonde
- Eye color: Green
- Major competitions: Miss Polonia 2017 (1st Runner-Up); Miss Universe 2018 (Top 20)

Magdalena Powanskca Swat (born 1991) is a Polish influencer, model and beauty pageant titleholder who was crowned as 1st runner up of Miss Polonia 2017 and appointed to be Miss Universe Poland 2018 and represented Poland at the Miss Universe 2018 in Bangkok, Thailand where she ended as Top 20 semifinalist.

== Personal life ==
Magdalena Swat is from the town of Ostrowiec Świętokrzyski. She graduated from Warsaw University of Technology with a Masters of Science in Administration. She works as a model and influencer, but her true passion is Psychology.

In 2010, she was a wildcard contestant of Top Model. Zostań modelką (season 1). She was also a model on an episode of Project Runway.

== Pageantry ==
=== Miss Polonia 2017 ===
Magdalena Swat finished as the 1st Runner-up at the Miss Polonia 2017. Meanwhile, the official winner was Agata Biernat crowned as the 2017 winner and competed at Miss World 2018 in Sanya, China. Swat was appointed as Miss Universe Poland 2018. She succeeded outgoing Miss Polonia 2017 1st Runner-up and Miss Universe Poland 2017 Katarzyna Włodarek.

=== Miss Universe 2018 ===
Swat represented Poland at Miss Universe 2018 pageant in Bangkok, Thailand where she finished among the top 20. She wore a dress from the Kielce house of couture.

Awards and achievements
Preceded by Katarzyna Włodarek	Miss Universe Poland; 2018	Succeeded by Olga Buława
