= Miss Polonia 2010 =

- Date: December 11, 2010
- Presenters: Agnieszka Szulim; Maciej Miecznikowski
- Entertainment: Norbi; Video; Iwona Węgrowska; Blue Café
- Venue: EXPO Hall, Łódź
- Broadcaster: TVP
- Entrants: 18
- Placements: 12
- Withdrawals: Lubusz; Warmia-Masuria; Australia; Sweden
- Winner: Rozalia Mancewicz; Podlaskie

Miss Polonia 2010 was the 36th Miss Polonia pageant, held at the EXPO Hall in Łódź, Poland, on December 11, 2010.

The winner was Rozalia Mancewicz of Podlaskie and she represented Poland in Miss Universe 2011 and Miss International 2012.

== Results ==
=== Placements ===
Placement	Contestant
Miss Polonia 2010	Podlaskie – Rozalia Mancewicz
1st Runner-Up	Lesser Poland – Agnieszka Kościelniak
2nd Runner-Up	Greater Poland – Natalia Tomczyk
Top 6	Greater Poland – Natalia Michalszczak; Kuyavia-Pomerania – Katarzyna Burczyńska; Łódź – Zuzanna Brzezińska
Top 12	Lower Silesia – Marta Haruk; Masovia – Monika Płochocka; Opole – Martyna Zapadka; Silesia – Arleta Respondek; Subcarpathia – Olga Lackosz; West Pomerania – Kinga Frąckiewicz

=== Special awards ===
Award	Contestant
Miss Internet	Podlaskie – Rozalia Mancewicz
Miss Personality	Greater Poland – Natalia Michalszczak

== Contestants ==
Represents	Candidate	Age	Height
Greater Poland	Natalia Michalszczak	20	180 cm (5 ft 11 in)
Greater Poland	Natalia Tomczyk	20	180 cm (5 ft 11 in)
Holy Cross	Magdalena Brojewska	23	174 cm (5 ft 8.5 in)
Kuyavia-Pomerania	Katarzyna Burczyńska	21	169 cm (5 ft 6.5 in)
Lesser Poland	Agnieszka Kościelniak	20	171 cm (5 ft 7 in)
Łódź	Zuzanna Brzezińska	19	176 cm (5 ft 9 in)
Lower Silesia	Marta Haruk	19	180 cm (5 ft 11 in)
Lublin	Agnieszka Stępień	18	172 cm (5 ft 7.5 in)
Masovia	Klaudia Natorska	19	170 cm (5 ft 7 in)
Masovia	Monika Płochocka	19	176 cm (5 ft 9 in)
Opole	Martyna Zapadka	18	173 cm (5 ft 8 in)
Podlaskie	Rozalia Mancewicz	23	175 cm (5 ft 9 in)
Pomerania	Anna Stankiewicz	23	175 cm (5 ft 9 in)
Silesia	Arletta Respondek	20	176 cm (5 ft 9 in)
Subcarpathia	Olga Lackosz	19	173 cm (5 ft 8 in)
West Pomerania	Aleksandra Ofianewska	20	176 cm (5 ft 9 in)
West Pomerania	Kinga Frąckiewicz	21	170 cm (5 ft 7 in)
Polish Community in Lithuania	Justyna Hajdukiewicz	21	168 cm (5 ft 6 in)

== Notes ==
=== Withdrawals ===
- Lubusz
- Warmia-Masuria
- Polish Community in Australia
- Polish Community in Sweden

=== Did not compete ===
- Polish Community in Argentina
- Polish Community in Belarus
- Polish Community in Brazil
- Polish Community in Canada
- Polish Community in France
- Polish Community in Germany
- Polish Community in Ireland
- Polish Community in Israel
- Polish Community in Russia
- Polish Community in South Africa
- Polish Community in the U.K.
- Polish Community in the U.S.
- Polish Community in Venezuela
