= Angelika Jakubowska =

Polish model

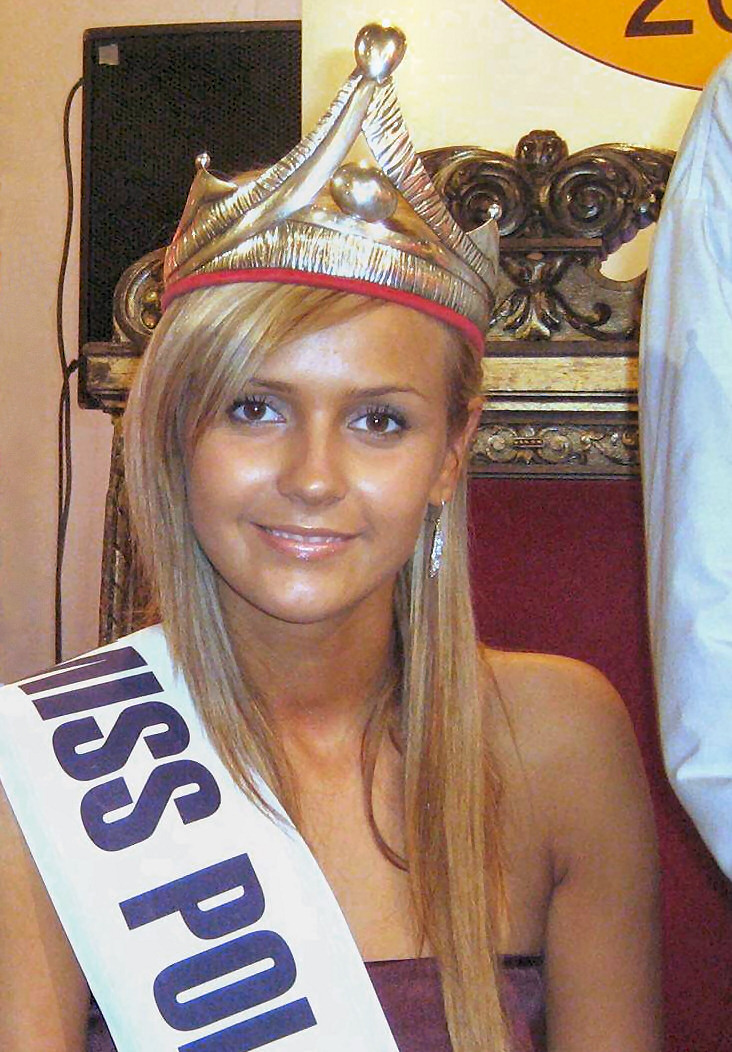
- Jakubowska at a public appearance, 2008
- Born: Angelika Jakubowska; 30 April 1989 (age 37); Lubań, Poland
- Beauty pageant titleholder
- Title: Miss Polonia 2008
- Hair color: Blonde
- Eye color: Brown

Angelika Jakubowska (born 30 April 1989) is a Polish model and beauty pageant titleholder who was crowned Miss Polonia 2008. She was Poland's representative at Miss Universe 2009 and Miss International 2009. Were during 2008 in a short relationship with Swedish semi-professional football player Magnus ”Mankan” Andersson. Jakubowska posed for Playboy Poland in September 2010.

== External ==
- Angelika Jakubowska profile on the Miss Universe website
- Angelika Jakubowska at Playboy

Preceded by Barbara Tatara	Miss Polonia; 2008	Succeeded by Maria Nowakowska
