= Władysława Kostakówna =

Polish spy, Miss Poland (1908–2001)

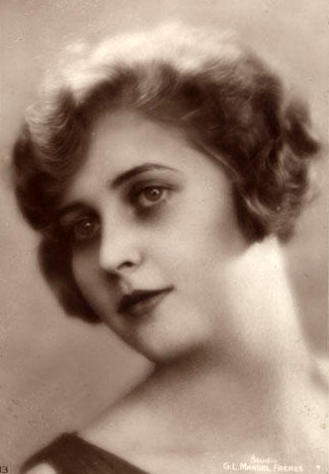
- Miss Poland, 1929
- Born: 20 December 1908; Warsaw, Poland
- Died: 1 March 2001 (aged 92); Aix-en-Provence, France
- Burial place: Montmorency cemetery
- Other name: Władysława Śliwińska
- Occupations: Spy, Miss Polond
- Known for: Spying for Allied Forces; Miss Poland

Władysława Kostakówna (also known as Władysława Śliwińska) (20 December 1908 – 1 March 2001) was a Polish spy for Allied forces in World War II. She was also a beauty pageant winner who gained fame as Miss Poland in 1929.

== Biography ==
Władysława Kostakówna was born 20 December 1908 in Warsaw, to a sculptor father Stanisław Kostak. In 1914 (at the start of World War I), she and her family locked their apartment in Poland and settled in Crimea. In 1920, the family returned to Warsaw only to discover that their apartment and all their possessions had been handed over to strangers, which forced them to build a new life in Warsaw. For three years, she lived in a monastery in St. Georges d'Aurac near Paris, France and commuted to Paris.

In January 1929, the 21-year-old Kostakówna was working as a correspondent for the Municipal Savings Bank in Warsaw and submitted her photo to a beauty competition. To her great surprise, she was awarded the title of Miss Polonia against the competition that included countesses and aristocrats. Thanks to her victory in Warsaw, she advanced to the next competition, representing Poland in the Miss Europe competition organized in Paris and came in second. This made her the first runner-up for the title. The title caused her to receive attention from suitors and movie studios, but she turned them all down, returning instead to her job at the Bank.

== Espionage agent ==
On 5 January 1930, in St. John's Cathedral in Warsaw, she married attorney Leon Śliwiński, a widower raising his only child alone. In 1939, with the start of World War II, the couple and Leon's son (also named Leon) drove the dangerous route through Yugoslavia and Italy to France. There her stepson Leon was recruited by Allied Forces to become an espionage agent and he recruited Władysława to help him. She became a cipher clerk and agent of the maritime network working for the "France" Branch under the pseudonym "Maria." She was designated a second lieutenant, not just sergeant, and her work included smuggling clothing and money to Allied agents.

One day, she took a novel path to protect her stepson.

"When Leon was arrested on 26 December 1942 by members of the Abwehr and the OVRA Association for anti-fascist activities, a notebook was left on the table in the lieutenant colonel's room. Władysława decided to take it with her when German agents took her for questioning. Sitting in the waiting room and taking advantage of the agents' inattention, Śliwińska ate her stepson's notebook in its entirety, fearing that it might contain compromising information about him."

When World War II ended, her family was unable to return to Poland, which had come under Soviet control, so she left with her husband and stepson for Casablanca, Morocco, where she worked for the Polish Government in Exile.

After her husband's death in 1971, she returned to France and settled in Aix-en-Provence, where she died at 93 on 1 March 2001. She was buried in the Montmorency cemetery.

== Selected honors ==
On 19 February 1951, aboard the British ship HMS Liverpool, in the port of Casablanca, she received the King's Medal for Courage in the Cause of Freedom (established by the President of the Republic of Poland in exile for soldiers of the Polish Army and members of the resistance movement). Newspaper coverage of the event resulted in the headline: Władysława Śliwińska – heroine of the Resistance Movement.

In Paris on 10 June 1986, she received the Legion of Honour and the pension allocated to those with this distinction. Other decorations included the Gold Cross of Merit with Swords, the French Croix de Guerre and the Médaille en Vermeil.
