= Miss Polonia 2005 =

- Date: September 2, 2005
- Presenters: Edward Lubaszenko; Olaf Lubaszenko; Krzysztof Krawczyk
- Entertainment: Wilki; Kombi; Justyna Steczkowska; Szymon Wydra; Carpe Diem; Tatiana Okupnik; Blue Café
- Venue: National Theater, Warsaw
- Broadcaster: TVP
- Entrants: 31
- Placements: 20
- Winner: Malwina Ratajczak; Opole

Miss Polonia 2005 was the 31st Miss Polonia pageant, held at the National Theatre in Warsaw, Poland, on September 2, 2005.

The winner was Malwina Ratajczak of Opole and she represented Poland in Miss World 2005 and Miss Baltic Sea 2006. Top 5 finalist Marta Jakoniuk represented Poland Miss International 2006. Top 5 finalist Francys Mayela Barraza Sudnicka represented the country at both Miss Universe 2006 and Miss Earth 2006.

== Results ==
=== Placements ===
Placement	Contestant
Miss Polonia 2005	Opole – Malwina Ratajczak
1st Runner-Up	Warmia-Masuria – Magdalena Zalewska
2nd Runner-Up	Lower Silesia – Agata Paskudzka
Top 5	Masovia – Marta Jakoniuk; Polish Community in Venezuela – Francys Sudnicka
Top 10	Greater Poland – Paulina Nowicka; Holy Cross – Magdalena Pobocha; Masovia – Marta Kozłowska; Silesia – Agata Janus; Silesia – Sandra Wilczok
Top 20	Greater Poland – Ewelina Wdówka; Greater Poland – Magdalena Grocholewska; Lublin – Emilia Ziemnicka; Masovia – Anna Jedlikowska; Opole – Agnieszka Pachucka; Silesia – Justyna Ciepielowska; Silesia – Magdalena Słopiecka; Silesia – Marta Legierska; Polish Community in Kazakhstan – Elena Ozinkowska; Polish Community in Sweden – Michaela Sorle

=== Special awards ===
Award	Contestant
Miss Photogenic	Opole – Agnieszka Pachucka
Miss Television Viewers	Opole – Malwina Ratajczak

== Official Delegates ==
Represents	Candidate	Age
Greater Poland	Beata Kozar	18
Greater Poland	Ewelina Wdówka	19
Greater Poland	Magdalena Grocholewska	20
Greater Poland	Paulina Nowicka	21
Holy Cross	Ewelina Kołomańska	22
Holy Cross	Justyna Sylwar	20
Holy Cross	Magdalena Pobocha	21
Lower Silesia	Agata Paskudzka	18
Lublin	Emilia Ziemnicka	20
Lublin	Karolina Stajkowska	19
Masovia	Anna Jedlikowska	19
Masovia	Diana Wółkiewicz	21
Masovia	Marta Jakoniuk	19
Masovia	Marta Kozłowska	22
Opole	Agnieszka Pachucka	18
Opole	Malwina Ratajczak	18
Podlaskie	Edyta Daniluk	19
Podlaskie	Emilia Tarasewicz	18
Podlaskie	Marta Michalczuk	21
Silesia	Agata Janus	18
Silesia	Justyna Ciepielowska	23
Silesia	Magdalena Słopiecka	18
Silesia	Marta Legierska	19
Silesia	Sandra Wilczok	18
Warmia-Masuria	Magdalena Zalewska	19
West Pomerania	Anna Chojnowska	18
Polish Community in Germany	Maria Mazurkiewicz	21
Polish Community in Kazakhstan	Elena Ozinkowska	21
Polish Community in Lithuania	Kamila Moro	18
Polish Community in Sweden	Michaela Sorle	19
Polish Community in Venezuela	Francys Mayela Barraza Sudnicka	25

== Notes ==
=== Did not compete ===
- Kuyavia-Pomerania
- Lesser Poland
- Łódź
- Lubusz
- Pomerania
- Subcarpathia
- Polish Community in Argentina
- Polish Community in Australia
- Polish Community in Belarus
- Polish Community in Brazil
- Polish Community in Canada
- Polish Community in France
- Polish Community in Ireland
- Polish Community in Israel
- Polish Community in Russia
- Polish Community in South Africa
- Polish Community in Ukraine
- Polish Community in the U.K.
- Polish Community in the U.S. — Anna Roszkowska, Miss Polonia USA; participated as a special guest and member of the Judges.
