= Zofia Batycka =

Polish model and actress

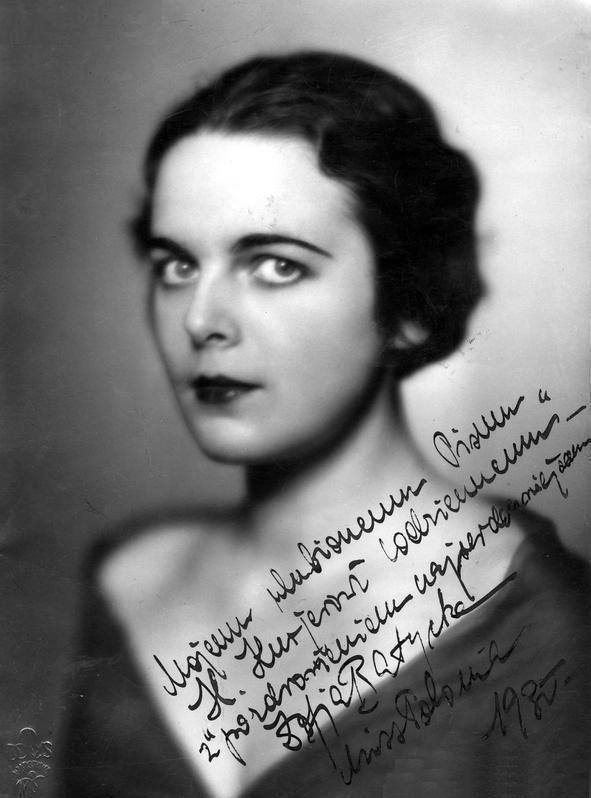
Batycka in 1930.

Zofia Maria Batycka (August 22, 1907 – April 6, 1989) was a Polish model and actress who was born in Lesko and died in Los Angeles. She won the title of Miss Polonia 1930 and Miss Paramount 1931.

== Filmography ==
- 1929 – Szlakiem hańby
- 1929 – Grzeszna miłość
- 1930 – Dusze w niewoli
- 1930 – Moralność Pani Dulskiej
- 1931 – Kobieta, która się śmieje
- 1931 – The Ten from Pawiak Prison
