= Miss Polonia 2017 =

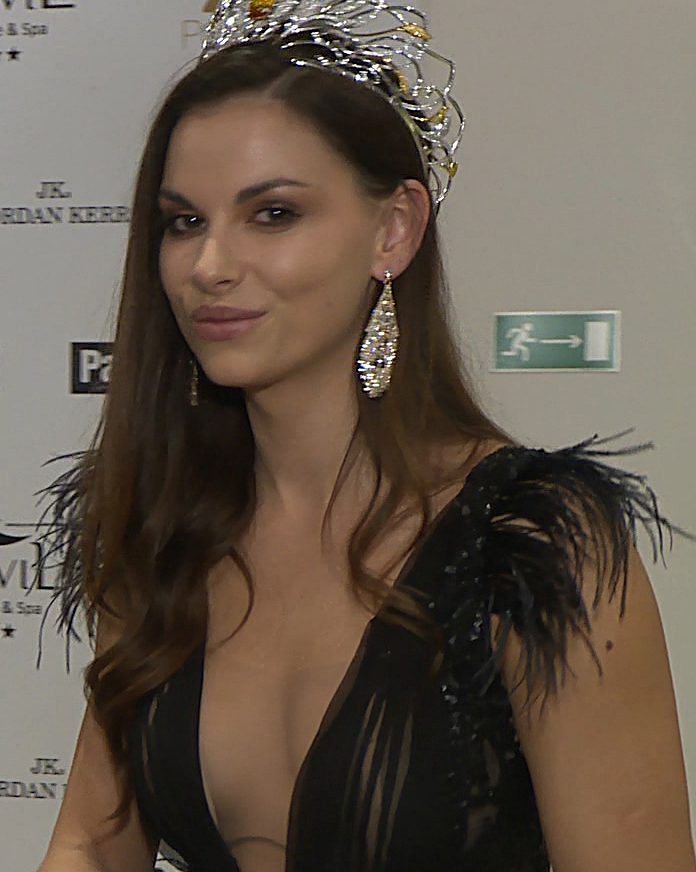
- Agata Biernat in 2018
- Date: 26 November 2017
- Presenters: Olivier Janiak
- Venue: Hotel Narvil Conference & Spa, Serock
- Broadcaster: Polsat
- Entrants: 20
- Placements: 10
- Withdrawals: Kuyavia-Pomerania; Lesser Poland; Podlasie
- Returns: Holy Cross; Lower Silesia; Lubusz; West Pomerania
- Winner: Agata Biernat; Łódź

Miss Polonia 2017 was the 40th Miss Polonia pageant, held on 26 November 2017. The winner was Agata Biernat of Łódź and she represented Poland in Miss World 2018 at Sanya. 1st Runner-Up Magdalena Swat represented Poland at Miss Universe 2018. 2nd Runner-Up Malwina Ratajczyk presented the country at Miss Grand International 2018.

== Results ==
=== Placements ===
Placement	Contestant
Miss Polonia 2017	Łódź – Agata Biernat
1st Runner-Up	Holy Cross – Magdalena Swat
2nd Runner-Up	West Pomerania – Lygia Böeva
Top 5	Łódź – Roksana Karolak; Warmia-Masuria – Monika Czajkowska
Top 10	Lower Silesia – Magdalena Borkowska; Lubusz – Agata Borowiak; Pomerania – Oliwia Ziobrowska; Silesia – Magdalena Fron; Warmia-Masuria – Aleksandra Kołodziejczyk

=== Special awards ===
Award	Contestant
Miss Public Vote	Warmia-Masuria – Monika Czajkowska

== Contestants ==
Represents	Candidate	Age	Height
Holy Cross	Ewa Ostrowska	20	172 cm (5 ft 7.5 in)
Holy Cross	Magdalena Swat	26	173 cm (5 ft 8 in)
Łódź	Agata Biernat	27	181 cm (5 ft 11 in)
Łódź	Karolina Połetek	19	179 cm (5 ft 10.5 in)
Łódź	Nela Serwacińska	19	172 cm (5 ft 7.5 in)
Łódź	Roksana Karolak	19	174 cm (5 ft 8.5 in)
Lower Silesia	Magdalena Borkowska	21	174 cm (5 ft 8.5 in)
Lublin	Weronika Marzęda	23	169 cm (5 ft 6.5 in)
Lubusz	Agata Borowiak	20	171 cm (5 ft 7 in)
Masovia	Aleksandra Górak	21	175 cm (5 ft 9 in)
Masovia	Hanna Gumowska	21	175 cm (5 ft 9 in)
Pomerania	Lygia Böeva	20	180 cm (5 ft 9 in)
Silesia	Hanna Dyląg	20	177 cm (5 ft 9.5 in)
Silesia	Magdalena Fron	26	178 cm (5 ft 10 in)
Silesia	Małgorzata Mitura	19	181 cm (5 ft 11 in)
Warmia-Masuria	Aleksandra Kołodziejczyk	19	182 cm (5 ft 11.5 in)
Warmia-Masuria	Anna Orlińska	21	170 cm (5 ft 7 in)
Warmia-Masuria	Lygia Böeva	20	182 cm (5 ft 11 in)
West Pomerania	Malwina Ratajczak	18	179 cm (5 ft 10.5 in)
West Pomerania	Nikola Korniluk	21	176 cm (5 ft 9 in)

== Notes ==
=== Returns ===
Last competed in 2011:

- Holy Cross
- Lower Silesia
- Lubusz

Last competed in 2012:

- West Pomerania

=== Withdrawals ===
- Kuyavia-Pomerania
- Lesser Poland
- Podlasie

=== Did not compete ===
- Greater Poland
- Opole
- Subcarpathia
- Polish Community in Argentina
- Polish Community in Australia
- Polish Community in Belarus
- Polish Community in Brazil
- Polish Community in Canada
- Polish Community in France
- Polish Community in Germany
- Polish Community in Ireland
- Polish Community in Israel
- Polish Community in Lithuania
- Polish Community in Russia
- Polish Community in South Africa
- Polish Community in Sweden
- Polish Community in the U.K.
- Polish Community in the U.S.
- Polish Community in Venezuela
