= Miss Polonia 2009 =

- Date: October 24, 2009
- Presenters: Beata Sadowska; Tomasz Karolak
- Entertainment: Ewa Farna; Pectus; Maciej Maleńczuk
- Venue: White Factory, Łódź
- Broadcaster: TVP
- Entrants: 20
- Placements: 15
- Withdrawals: Polish Community in Canada; Polish Community in the U.S.
- Winner: Maria Nowakowska; Lower Silesia

Miss Polonia 2009 was the 35th Miss Polonia pageant, held at the White Factory in Łódź, Poland, on October 24, 2009.

The winner was Maria Nowakowska of Lower Silesia and she represented Poland in Miss Universe 2010. Top 5 finalist Beata Polakowska represented Poland at Miss Earth 2010. Top 10 finalist Żaneta Sitko represented the country at Miss International 2010.

== Results ==
=== Placements ===
Placement	Contestant
Miss Polonia 2009	Lower Silesia – Maria Nowakowska
1st Runner-Up	Łódź – Agata Biernat
2nd Runner-Up	Lubusz – Katarzyna Suberska
Top 5	Lesser Poland – Agnieszka Steczkiewicz; Podlaskie – Beata Polakowska (later named Miss Earth Poland 2010)
Top 10	Lublin – Elżbieta Tokarska; Opole – Dominika Kucharczyk; Podlaskie – Natalia Nowicka; West Pomerania – Żaneta Sitko (later named Miss International Poland 2010); Polish Community in Lithuania – Agnieszka Mozyro
Top 15	Greater Poland – Emilia Piszel; Holy Cross – Ewelina Sahloul; Silesia – Brygida Zielińska; Subcarpathia – Sabina Haptaś; Warmia-Masuria – Kamila Kęsicka

=== Special awards ===
Award	Contestant
Miss Internet	Podlaskie – Beata Polakowska

== Contestants ==
Represents	Candidate	Age	Height
Greater Poland	Emilia Piszel		179 cm (5 ft 10.5 in)
Holy Cross	Ewelina Sahloul		175 cm (5 ft 9 in)
Kuyavia-Pomerania	Paulina Ferlinska		181 cm (5 ft 11 in)
Lesser Poland	Agnieszka Steczkiewicz	22	176 cm (5 ft 9 in)
Łódź	Agata Biernat	19	181 cm (5 ft 11 in)
Lower Silesia	Maria Nowakowska	22	181 cm (5 ft 11 in)
Lublin	Elżbieta Tokarska	22	180 cm (5 ft 11 in)
Lubusz	Katarzyna Suberska	18	171 cm (5 ft 7 in)
Masovia	Marta Jaskulska		176 cm (5 ft 9 in)
Opole	Dominika Kucharczyk	23	180 cm (5 ft 11 in)
Podlaskie	Beata Polakowska	23	172 cm (5 ft 7.5 in)
Podlaskie	Natalia Nowicka	18	175 cm (5 ft 9 in)
Pomerania	Alicja Kondracka	23	170 cm (5 ft 7 in)
Silesia	Brygida Zielińska		172 cm (5 ft 7.5 in)
Subcarpathia	Sabina Haptaś		176 cm (5 ft 9 in)
Warmia-Masuria	Kamila Kęsicka		175 cm (5 ft 9 in)
West Pomerania	Ewelina Siemaszko	23	177 cm (5 ft 9.5 in)
Polish Community in Australia	Natalia Strzelczyk		178 cm (5 ft 10 in)
Polish Community in Lithuania	Agnieszka Mozyro	23	179 cm (5 ft 10.5 in)
Polish Community in Sweden	Ewelina Siemaszko		177 cm (5 ft 9.5 in)

== Notes ==
=== Withdrawals ===
- Polish Community in Canada
- Polish Community in the U.S.

=== Did not compete ===
- Polish Community in Argentina
- Polish Community in Belarus
- Polish Community in Brazil
- Polish Community in France
- Polish Community in Germany
- Polish Community in Ireland
- Polish Community in Israel
- Polish Community in Russia
- Polish Community in South Africa
- Polish Community in the U.K.
- Polish Community in Venezuela
