= Paulina Krupińska =

Polish beauty pageant titleholder

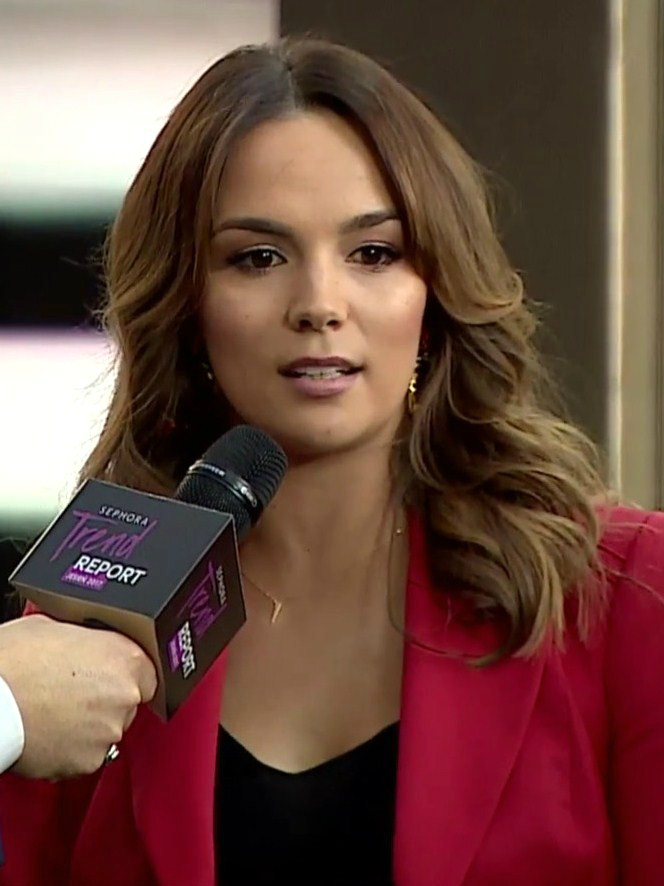
- Born: Paulina Krupińska-Karpiel; 22 June 1987 (age 39); Warsaw, Poland
- Height: 1.78 m (5 ft 10 in)
- Beauty pageant titleholder
- Title: Miss Polonia 2012
- Hair color: Dark Brown
- Eye color: Brown
- Major competitions: Miss Polonia 2012 (Winner); Miss Universe 2013 (Miss Photogenic)

Paulina Krupińska (born 22 June 1987) is the Polish model and beauty pageant titleholder who was crowned Miss Poland 2012 and represented Poland at the Miss Universe 2013 pageant in Moscow, Russia. She won the Miss Photogenic award.

== Early life ==
In 1987, Krupinska was born in Warsaw, Mazowieckie in Poland.

== Miss Polonia ==
Krupinska was crowned Miss Polonia 2012 by Marcelina Zawadzka (Miss Polonia 2011) at the grand coronation night on 2 February 2013, hosted by Edyta Herbuś and Maciej Kurzajewski and broadcast on TVP2 from the ATM studio in Warsaw.

== Miss Universe 2013 ==
Krupinska represented Poland at the 62nd annual Miss Universe pageant on 9 November 2013 in Moscow, Russia.

Awards and achievements
Preceded by (Kosovo) Diana Avdiu	Miss Photogenic Universe; 2013	Succeeded by (Puerto Rico) Gabriela Berrios
Preceded by Marcelina Zawadzka	Miss Polonia; 2012	Succeeded by Marcela Chmielowska
