= Miss Polonia 2012 =

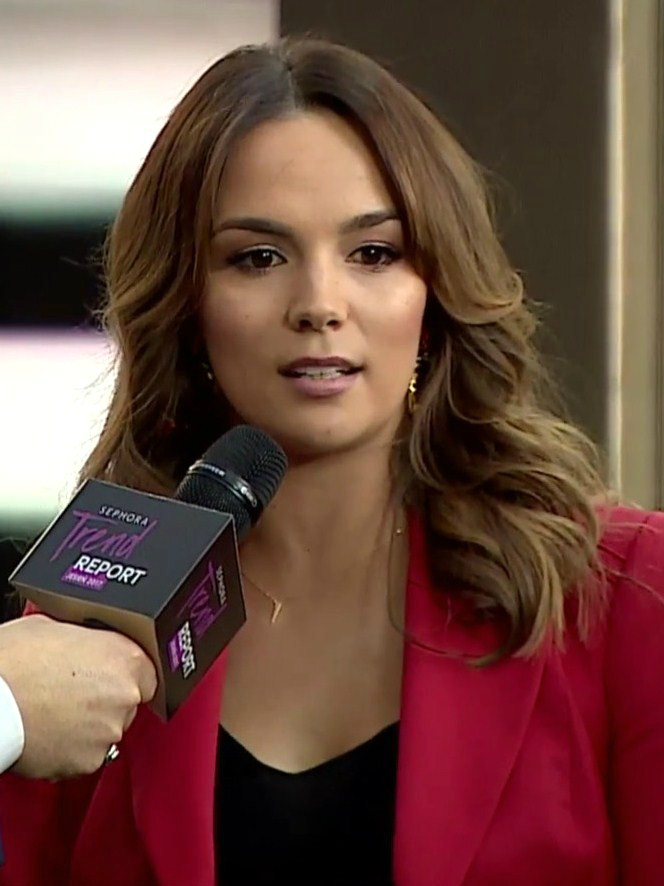
- Paulina Krupińska in 2017
- Date: February 2, 2013
- Presenters: Edyta Herbuś; Maciej Kurzajewski
- Entertainment: Edyta Górniak
- Venue: ATM Studio, Warsaw
- Broadcaster: TVP
- Entrants: 19
- Placements: 10
- Withdrawals: Holy Cross; Kuyavia-Pomerania; Lower Silesia; Lublin; Lubusz; Silesia; Polish Community in Lithuania
- Winner: Paulina Krupińska; Masovia

Miss Polonia 2012 was the 38th Miss Polonia pageant, held on February 2, 2013. The winner was Paulina Krupińska of Masovia and she represented Poland in Miss Universe 2013. 2nd Runner-Up, Aleksandra Szczęsna represented the country in Miss Earth 2013.

== Results ==
=== Placements ===
Placement	Contestant
Miss Polonia 2012	Masovia – Paulina Krupińska
1st Runner-Up	Masovia – Żaneta Płudowska
2nd Runner-Up	Masovia – Aleksandra Szczęsna
Top 5	Greater Poland – Patrycja Dorywalska; Masovia – Katarzyna Oracka (later named Miss International Poland 2013)
Top 12	Łódź – Natalia Piguła; Lower Poland – Paulina Mróz; Pomerania – Monika Domaszewska; Subcarpathia – Renata Kłodowska; Warmia-Masuria – Dominika Rynkiewicz; West Pomerania – Paulina Stelmasińska; Polish Community in Ireland – Kamila Moraczewska

== Judges ==
- Maciej Zień - Polish Fashion Creator
- Bogna Sworowska - 2nd Runner-Up at Miss Polonia 1987
- Witold Szmańda - Fitness Trainer
- Maciej Wróblewski - Hair Creator
- Izabela Grzybowska - Photographer
- Tomasz Kocewiak - Make-up Artist
- Jacek Rozenek - Actor
- Zbigniew Bartman - Polish representative in Volleyball
- Kamila Szczawińska - Model
- Małgorzata Herde - General Director of BMP

== Official Delegates ==
Represents	Candidate	Age	Height
Greater Poland	Oliwia Bartkowiak	18	176 cm (5 ft 9 in)
Greater Poland	Patrycja Dorywalska	22	175 cm (5 ft 9 in)
Lesser Poland	Anna Markowska	21	176 cm (5 ft 9 in)
Lesser Poland	Paulina Mróz	20	172 cm (5 ft 7.5 in)
Łódź	Natalia Piguła	18	176 cm (5 ft 9 in)
Masovia	Aleksandra Szczęsna	19	175 cm (5 ft 9 in)
Masovia	Katarzyna Oracka	24	175 cm (5 ft 9 in)
Masovia	Paulina Krupińska	25	174 cm (5 ft 8.5 in)
Masovia	Żaneta Płudowska	19	172 cm (5 ft 7.5 in)
Podlasie	Paula Zajkowska	23	175 cm (5 ft 9 in)
Pomerania	Joanna Wiśniewska	22	174 cm (5 ft 8.5 in)
Pomerania	Marta Dymek	20	175 cm (5 ft 9 in)
Pomerania	Monika Domaszewska	19	171 cm (5 ft 7 in)
Subcarpathia	Renata Kłodowska	22	171 cm (5 ft 7 in)
Warmia-Masuria	Dominika Rynkiewicz	19	176 cm (5 ft 9 in)
West Pomerania	Gnarowska Żaklina	20	173 cm (5 ft 8 in)
West Pomerania	Paulina Stelmasińska	20	171 cm (5 ft 7 in)
Polish Community in Ireland	Kamila Moraczewska	26	178 cm (5 ft 10 in)
Polish Community in Sweden	Nelly Kvist	20	175 cm (5 ft 9 in)

== Notes ==
=== Withdrawals ===
- Holy Cross
- Kuyavia-Pomerania
- Lower Silesia
- Lublin - Ira Watwat originally was a finalist but she was later forced to withdraw after breaking the rules of the grouping of the competition. No other finalists were from Lublin.
- Lubusz
- Silesia
- Polish Community in Lithuania

=== Did not compete ===
- Opole
- Polish Community in Argentina
- Polish Community in Australia
- Polish Community in Belarus
- Polish Community in Brazil
- Polish Community in Canada
- Polish Community in France
- Polish Community in Germany
- Polish Community in Israel
- Polish Community in Russia
- Polish Community in South Africa
- Polish Community in the U.K.
- Polish Community in the U.S.
- Polish Community in Venezuela
