= Roksana Jonek =

Polish model and businesswoman (born 1978)

Roksana Jonek-Kosowska is a former Polish beauty pageant participant and businesswoman.

== Biography ==
Roksana Jonek was born in Mikołów and started taking part in beauty contests while being lyceum student. In 1996 she won the local title "Miss Śląsk and Zagłębie", which allowed her to take part in Miss Polonia 1997, and which she won, earning the crown, a Fiat Brava car, and a fox fur coat. She coild not take part in the Miss Polski pageant that year, being underage, barely under 19. In 1998 she became Miss Tourism International.

She did not enter a career in show business. She married a footballer Kamil Kosowski and she started managing a family-owned doughnut business "Nasza Pączkarnia" in Bielsko-Biała. As of 2022, Kamil and Roksana have two sons (born in 2007 and 2012). In 2011 they registered a business, "Kosowski & Jonek", which, in addition to doughnuts, deals with construction and real estate services.
