= Agata Biernat =

Polish beauty pageant titleholder

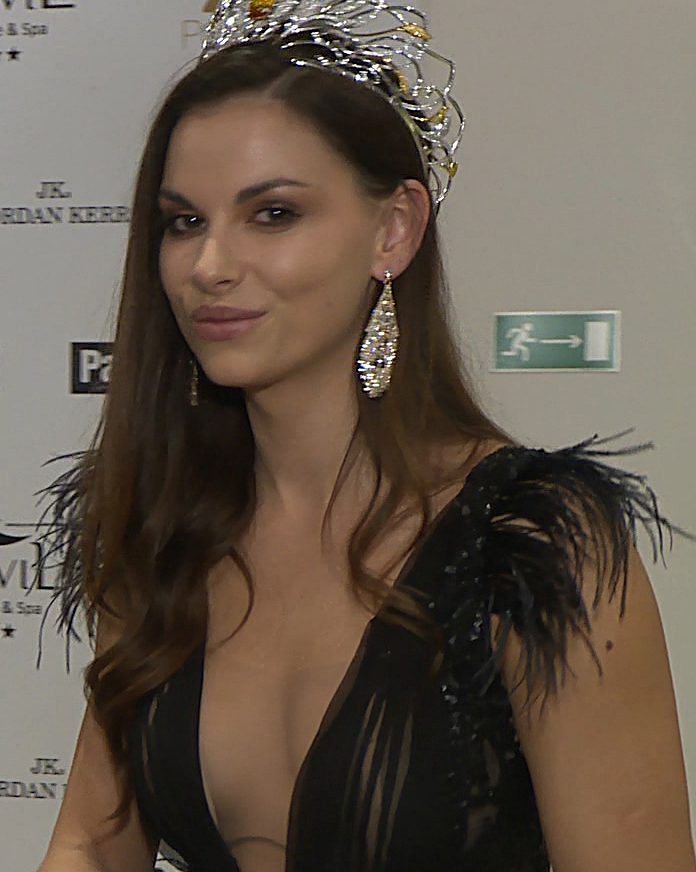
- Born: Agata Biernat; 1989 (age 36–37); Zduńska Wola, Poland
- Height: 1.83 m (6 ft 0 in)
- Beauty pageant titleholder
- Title: Miss Polonia 2017
- Hair color: Brown
- Eye color: Hazel
- Major competitions: Miss Polonia 2009 (1st Runner-Up); Miss Polonia 2017 (Winner); Miss World 2018 (Unplaced)

Agata Biernat (born 1989) is a Polish beauty pageant titleholder who won the Miss Polonia 2017. She represented Poland at the Miss World 2018 pageant in China, in December.

== Personal life ==
Biernat lives in Zduńska Wola, Poland. She has been involved in dance and sport since childhood, since she was a child she trained dance and athletics. She is a dance instructor in many dance styles, including pole dance, as well as fitness instructor and personal trainer. Biernat started to compete at Miss Polonia in 2009. She was First Runner-up while Maria Nowakowska won the title and competed at Miss Universe 2010 in Las Vegas. In 2017 she finally won the national title.

The Miss Polonia Organization was recently granted the rights to send the Polish contestant to Miss World (their last year was 2006). Agata was chosen to represent Poland and was officially crowned Miss World Poland 2018 in a small ceremony. Since the Miss World and Miss Universe pageants conflict in terms of dates, the new Miss Polonia 2018 competed at Miss World.

=== Achievements ===
- Miss Polonia 2017.

Awards and achievements
Preceded by Izabella Krzan	Miss Polonia; 2017	Succeeded by Milena Sadowska
