= Katarzyna Borowicz =

Polish model

Katarzyna Weronika Borowicz
- Born: 28 June 1985 (age 41); Ostrów Wielkopolski, Greater Poland, Poland
- Height: 173 cm (5 ft 8 in)
- Beauty pageant titleholder
- Title: Miss Polonia 2004; Miss Earth Water 2005
- Hair color: Dark brown
- Major competitions: Miss World 2004; (Top 5); Miss Earth 2005; (Miss Earth – Water); Miss Europe 2006; (3rd Runner-Up)

Katarzyna Weronika Borowicz (born 28 June 1985 in Ostrów Wielkopolski, Poland) is a Polish actress, model and beauty pageant titleholder who has competed at the Miss World, Miss Earth and Miss Europe pageants.

In 2004, she won the Miss Poland (Miss Polonia) title, and went on to place Top 5 at Miss World 2004, 2nd Runner-up at Miss Earth 2005 and 3rd Runner-up at Miss Europe 2006.

Since May 2007, she has worked for a Polish television station Lech Poznań, where she is a host of her own program called Babskim okiem (In woman's view). After living in Milan, Italy for 12 years, where she worked as a model and tv reporter for World Fashiom Channel, she moved to the United Arab Emirates where she started a small business. She is also working as a real estate agent.
