= Magdalena Jaworska =

Polish journalist, fashion designer and beauty pageant titleholder

- Born: Magdalena Jaworska; 3 June 1961; Warsaw, Poland
- Died: 26 July 1994 (aged 33); Warsaw, Poland
- Resting place: Powązki Cemetery, Warsaw
- Education: University of Warsaw
- Occupations: journalist, author and fashion designer
- Known for: Winning Miss Polonia 1984
- Spouse: Dariusz Przychoda (m. 1985)
- Children: 1

Magdalena Jaworska-Przychoda (3 June 1961 – 26 July 1994), more commonly known as Magdalena Jaworska, was a Polish journalist, author, fashion designer and beauty pageant titleholder who the winner of Miss Polonia 1984 and represented her country at Miss World 1984.

== Information ==
Jaworska was born on 3 June 1961, in Warsaw, Poland. Even in elementary school, she was predicted to become a model. While studying at the University of Warsaw, she decided to try out for the 1984 Miss Polonia qualifiers. She nearly missed the final qualifier after sleeping too late. Prior to the start of Miss Polonia 1984, rumours had circulated that the winner of the competition was already pre-determined which led to a boycott. The situation was initially resolved, but rigging accusations came up again after Joanna Karska was initially chosen as the winner. The voting process was repeated and this time, Jaworska was declared the winner. Jaworska later claimed that she had no idea how she won. Jaworska was also awarded the "Miss Publiczności" (Miss Audience) and the "Najmilsza Miss" (Nicest Miss) awards, which Jaworska said she valued more than winning Miss Polonia. Jaworska later showed her displeasure with the situation by becoming the only Miss Polonia winner to never wear the crown on her head, opting to wear it on her finger instead. Jaworska was scheduled to compete in Miss Universe 1984, but asked to go to Miss World 1984 instead. This was due to Miss World being held in Britain, where she had relatives. She made various appearances as Miss Polonia and claimed that she had to ride on the public bus in her full pageant attire. She also competed in Miss Europe 1985, but finished outside of the Top 5.

After Miss Europe, she got married and had a child named Michael. She defended her master's thesis in 1988, which was about Jean-Paul Sartre's concept of freedom. She became a presenter on the Polish news program Teleexpress, and later claimed that representatives from the Miss Polonia organization got her banned from television.

In 1990, she wrote an autobiography entitled, "Być albo nie być Miss" (lit. "To be or not to be Miss"), describing the behind-the-scenes happenings of various beauty contests, which caused controversy. The Miss Polonia organization also pushed for the book to be banned from being exported. She later created a clothing company called, "Miss Top".

== Death ==
Jaworska was found unconscious inside her home on 8 July 1994. Her hair dryer had fallen into the water while in use and caused her to be electrocuted. She was hospitalized and placed in intensive care, but died on 26 July 1994 without ever regaining consciousness. The situation went public with concerns that she was murdered, but it was eventually declared to be a death due to an accident. She was laid to rest at Powązki Cemetery three days later.

In 2009, her death was covered on the Polish television series, Miejsca przeklęte (Cursed Places)

In 2016, Jaworska and the circumstances on her death were namedropped in Episode 9047 of Coronation Street.
