= Karolina Bielawska =

Polish beauty pageant titleholder, Miss World 2021

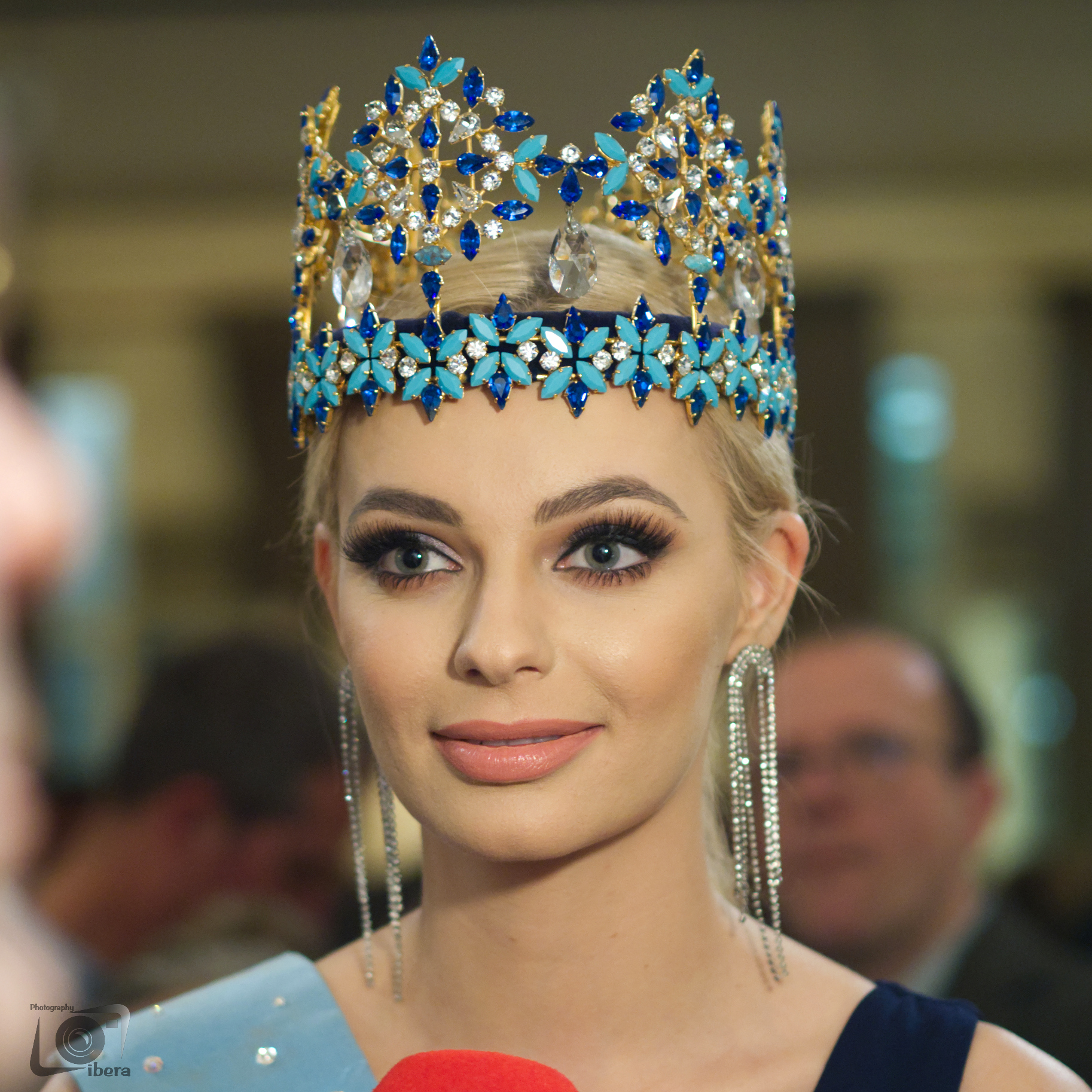
- Bielawska in 2022
- Born: 11 April 1999 (age 27); Łódź, Poland
- Education: Łódź University of Technology
- Height: 5 ft 10 1/2 in (1.79 m)
- Beauty pageant titleholder
- Title: Miss Polonia 2019; Miss World 2021
- Hair color: Blonde
- Eye color: Blue
- Major competitions: Miss Polonia 2019; (Winner); Miss World 2021; (Winner)

Karolina Bielawska (born 11 April 1999) is a Polish model and beauty queen who was crowned Miss World 2021.

== Personal life ==
Bielawska was born in Łódź. She is a business student with a bachelor's degree in management and she is studying for her master's degree.

She is the daughter of Agnieszka Zakrzewska-Bielawska, dean of the Faculty of Organization and Management of the Łódź University of Technology, and Łukasz Bielawski, former president of ŁKS Łódź.

== Pageantry ==
=== Miss Polonia 2019 ===
On 24 November 2019, Bielawska represented Łódź at Miss Polonia 2019 and won the title, making her Poland's Miss World 2020 candidate. Miss World 2020 was cancelled due to the COVID-19 pandemic. She retained the Miss World Poland 2021 title.

After being selected, she engaged in charity activities, such as volunteering for "Soup na Pietrynie", initiator of the Polish National Charity Action "Korona z Głowy" supporting those in need during the pandemic, ambassador of the social campaign "Dotykam = Wygrywam" acting to fight breast cancer and a participant in the "FASS OFF" campaign for the Dom Foundation in Łódź. She supports the Great Orchestra of Christmas Charity and the DKMS Foundation, is an ambassador of the charity action fighting COVID-19 in Peru, the action included in the Ministry of Foreign Affairs "Polonia4Neighbors", and as part of the charity project "Beauty with a purpose" together with the Foundation "Zupa na Pietrynie" created the first bathhouse in Łódź for people who are homeless.

=== Miss World 2021 ===
Bielawska won Miss World 2021 at the Coca-Cola Music Hall in San Juan, Puerto Rico on 16 March 2022. She became the second Pole to win Miss World after Aneta Kręglicka in 1989.

During her reign as Miss World, she visited Puerto Rico, the United Kingdom, Romania, United States, Ecuador, Ivory Coast, Lebanon, Vietnam, Malaysia, Singapore, Indonesia, Botswana, Finland, United Arab Emirates, India, Philippines, and Ukraine, in addition to her native Poland.

Awards and achievements
| Preceded by (Jamaica) Toni-Ann Singh | Miss World; 2021 | Succeeded by (Czech Republic) Krystyna Pyszková |
| Preceded by Milena Sadowska | Miss Polonia; 2019 | Succeeded by Natalia Gryglewska |
| Preceded by Milena Sadowska | Miss World Poland; 2021 | Succeeded by Krystyna Sokolowska |
