= Maria Nowakowska =

Polish beauty pageant titleholder

- Born: 14 March 1987 (age 39); Legnica, Poland
- Beauty pageant titleholder
- Title: Miss Polonia 2009
- Hair color: Brown
- Eye color: Brown
- Major competitions: Miss Polonia 2009 (Winner); Miss Universe 2010 (Unplaced)

Maria Nowakowska (born 14 March 1987) is a Polish model and beauty pageant titleholder who was crowned Miss Polonia 2009. She was Poland's representative at Miss Universe 2010.

Awards and achievements
Preceded by Angelika Jakubowska	Miss Polonia; 2009	Succeeded by Rozalia Mancewicz
