= Rozalia Mancewicz =

Polish beauty pageant titleholder (born 1987)

- Born: Rozalia Mancewicz; 27 June 1987 (age 39); Melbourne, Australia
- Height: 1.75 m (5 ft 9 in)
- Beauty pageant titleholder
- Title: Miss Polonia 2010
- Hair color: Blonde
- Eye color: Green
- Major competitions: Miss Tourism Queen Int'l 2005 (3rd Runner-Up); Miss Polonia 2010 (Winner) (Miss Internet); Miss Universe 2011 (Unplaced); Miss International 2012 (Unplaced)

Rozalia Mancewicz (born 27 June 1987) is a Polish model and beauty pageant titleholder who was crowned Miss Polonia 2010 and represented her country in Miss Universe 2011 and in Miss International 2012.

== Early life ==
A native of Pomigacze, Mancewicz studied English at the University of Białystok, aiming to become an interpreter.

== Miss Tourism Queen International 2005 ==
Prior to her participation in Miss Polonia, Mancewicz was the official representative of her country to the 2005 Miss Tourism Queen International pageant held in Hangzhou, where she placed third runner-up to eventual winner, Nikoletta Ralli of Greece.

== Miss Polonia 2010 ==
Mancewicz, who stands 1.75 m (5 ft 9 in) tall, competed as one of 18 finalists in her country's national beauty pageant, Miss Polonia, held in Łódź on 11 December 2010, where she obtained the Miss Internet award and became the eventual winner of the title, gaining the right to represent Poland in Miss Universe 2011.

Awards and achievements
Preceded by Maria Nowakowska	Miss Polonia; 2010	Succeeded by Marcelina Zawadzka
