= Marcelina Zawadzka =

Polish model (born 1989)

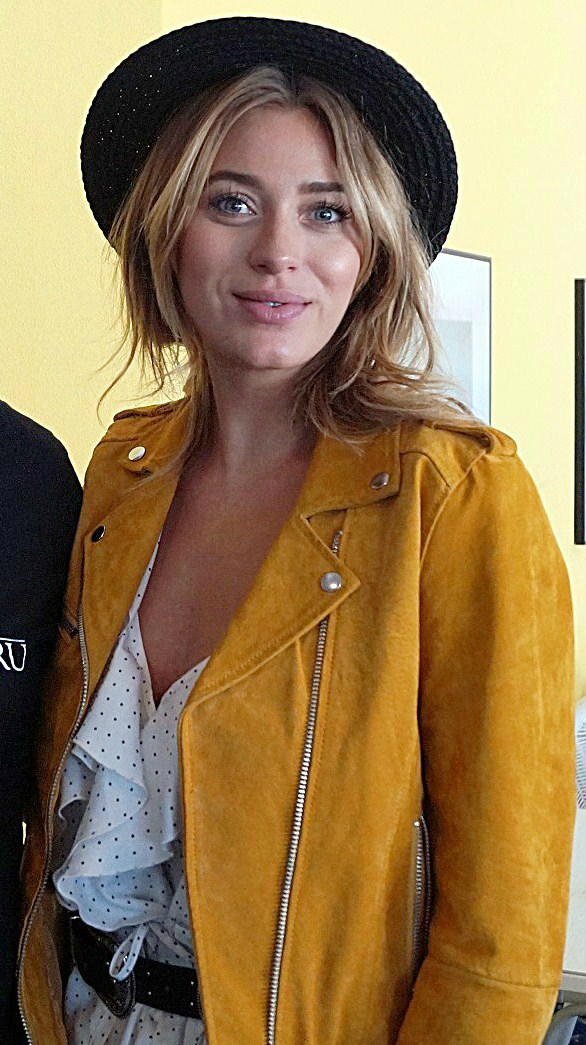
- Born: Marcelina Zawadzka; 25 January 1989 (age 37); Malbork, Poland
- Height: 180 cm (5 ft 11 in)
- Beauty pageant titleholder
- Title: Miss Polonia 2011
- Hair color: Blonde
- Eye color: Blue
- Major competitions: Miss Polonia 2011 (Winner); Miss Universe 2012 (Top 16)

Marcelina Zawadzka (born 25 January 1989) is a Polish model and beauty pageant titleholder who was crowned Miss Polonia 2011 and represented her country in Miss Universe 2012.

== Miss Polonia 2011 and Miss Universe 2012 ==
Marcelina Zawadzka has been crowned Miss Polonia 2011 by Rozalia Mancewicz (Miss Polonia 2010) on Friday night 9 December 2011 at the Center for Folklore "Matecznik - Mazowsze" in Otrebusy near Warsaw. Marcelina Zawadzka represented Poland in Miss Universe 2012 and was among the top 16, It was the highest placement for Poland since 1989.

== Dancing with the Stars: Taniec z Gwiazdami ==
Marcelina Zawadzka participated in the 15th season of Polish Dancing with the Stars - Taniec z Gwiazdami.

| Week # | Dance/Song | Judges' score | | | | Result |
| Week # | Dance/Song | Grabowski | Pavlović | Tyszkiewicz | Malitowski | Result |
| 1 | Waltz/ "If You Don't Know Me by Now" | 9 | 7 | 9 | 7 | Safe |
| 2 | Cha-cha-cha/ "Waiting for Tonight" | 9 | 8 | 9 | 7 | Safe |
| 3 | Rumba/ "Maria Maria" | 10 | 10 | 10 | 9 | Safe |
| 4 | Viennese Waltz/ "Iris" | 10 | 9 | 10 | 7 | Safe |
| 5 | Contemporary/ "Let Her Go"; Latin Freestyle (Team Loca)/ "Loca | 10; 8 | 9; 10 | 10; 8 | 9; 9 | Safe |
| 6 | Tango/ "Somebody That I Used to Know" | 9 | 7 | 10 | 6 | Safe |
| 7 | Jive/ "I'll Be There for You"; R&R Marathon / "Rock Around the Clock" | 9 Awarded | 10; 6 | 10 extra | 8 points | Safe |
| 8 | Waltz/ "Nothing Compares 2 U"; Hip-hop/ "Sweet Dreams | 10; 9 | 9; 8 | 10; 8 | 9; 8 | Safe |
| 9 | Quickstep/ "Day-O (The Banana Boat Song)"; Rumba/ "Falling | 10; 10 | 10; 10 | 10; 10 | 10; 10 | Safe |
| 10; Semi-finals | Cha-cha-cha/ "I Will Survive"; Pop/ "Crazy in Love"; Viennese Waltz/ "Iris (song)" | 10; 9; 10 | 8; 9; 10 | 10; 9; 10 | 8; 8; 10 | Third place |

== Motorsport ==
In late 2019, Zawadzka announced that she would be making her motorsport debut in the 2020 Africa Eco Race driving in the truck category. She and co-drivers Baran Grzegorz and Sebastian Greszta finished the rally 11th in the truck class out of 13 finishers and 41st overall.

Awards and achievements
| Preceded by Rozalia Mancewicz | Miss Polonia; 2011 | Succeeded by Paulina Krupińska |
