= Miss Polonia 2016 =

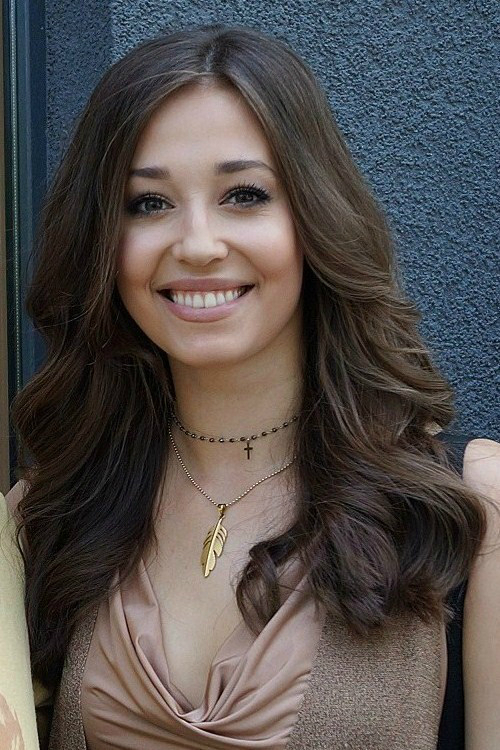
- Izabella Krzan in 2018
- Date: November 12, 2016
- Presenters: Olivier Janiak
- Entertainment: Halina Mlynkova; Kasia Cerekwicka; Łukasz Zagrobelny
- Venue: Hotel Narvil Conference & Spa, Serock
- Entrants: 20
- Placements: 10
- Withdrawals: Subcarpathia; Greater Poland; West Pomerania; Polish Community in Ireland; Polish Community in Sweden
- Winner: Izabella Krzan; Warmia-Masuria

Miss Polonia 2016 was the 39th Miss Polonia pageant, held on November 12, 2016. The winner was Izabella Krzan of Warmia-Masuria and she represented Poland in Miss Universe 2016. 2nd Runner-Up, Katarzyna Włodarek later represented Poland in Miss Universe 2017 due to the pageant taking place prior to Miss Polonia 2017. 1st Runner-Up, Dominika Szymańska represented the country in Miss Earth 2017.

== Results ==
=== Placements ===
Placement	Contestant
Miss Polonia 2016	Warmia-Masuria – Izabella Krzan
1st Runner-Up	Kuyavia-Pomerania – Dominika Szymańska
2nd Runner-Up	Łódź – Katarzyna Włodarek
Top 5	Lesser Poland – Katarzyna Szklarczyk; Silesia – Ludwika Cichecka
Top 10	Łódź – Agata Drywa; Łódź – Angelika Stepien; Łódź – Paulina Rułka; Lublin – Angelika Lipa; Masovia – Karolina Mikołajczyk

=== Special awards ===
Award	Contestant
Miss VitaDiet Poland	Łódź – Katarzyna Włodarek
Miss Public Vote	Silesia – Ludwika Cichecka

== Contestants ==
Represents	Candidate	Age	Height
Kuyavia-Pomerania	Dominika Szymańska	21	177 cm (5 ft 9.5 in)
Kuyavia-Pomerania	Ewa Woch	22	180 cm (5 ft 11 in)
Lesser Poland	Katarzyna Szklarczyk	20	179 cm (5 ft 10.5 in)
Łódź	Agata Drywa	25	174 cm (5 ft 8.5 in)
Łódź	Aleksandra Śmiałkowska	22	170 cm (5 ft 7 in)
Łódź	Angelika Stepien	19	177 cm (5 ft 9.5 in)
Łódź	Katarzyna Włodarek	25	175 cm (5 ft 9 in)
Łódź	Paulina Rułka	21	177 cm (5 ft 9.5 in)
Lublin	Angelika Lipa	20	177 cm (5 ft 9.5 in)
Lublin	Anna Pupiel	26	180 cm (5 ft 11 in)
Masovia	Aleksandra Woźnica	19	176 cm (5 ft 9 in)
Masovia	Angelika Staros	24	178 cm (5 ft 10 in)
Masovia	Karolina Mikołajczyk	22	178 cm (5 ft 10 in)
Masovia	Karolina Suchenek	23	173 cm (5 ft 8 in)
Masovia	Patrycja Pochmara	25	175 cm (5 ft 9 in)
Podlasie	Kinga Zabielska	18	173 cm (5 ft 8 in)
Pomerania	Natalia Koresendowicz	25	177 cm (5 ft 9.5 in)
Silesia	Ludwika Cichecka	24	180 cm (5 ft 11 in)
Silesia	Natalia Popis	22	175 cm (5 ft 9 in)
Warmia-Masuria	Izabella Krzan	21	180 cm (5 ft 11 in)

== Notes ==
=== Withdrawals ===
- Greater Poland
- Subcarpathia
- West Pomerania
- Polish Community in Ireland
- Polish Community in Sweden

=== Did not compete ===
- Holy Cross
- Lower Silesia
- Lubusz
- Opole
- Polish Community in Argentina
- Polish Community in Australia
- Polish Community in Belarus
- Polish Community in Brazil
- Polish Community in Canada
- Polish Community in France
- Polish Community in Germany
- Polish Community in Israel
- Polish Community in Lithuania
- Polish Community in Russia
- Polish Community in South Africa
- Polish Community in the U.K.
- Polish Community in the U.S.
- Polish Community in Venezuela
