= Małgorzata Rożniecka =

Polish model and beauty queen (born 1978)

Małgorzata Rożniecka (born 1978, in Szczecin) is a Polish model and beauty queen who won Miss International 2001.

Her 2001 victory broke the four-year monopoly of Latin American countries of the crown. She is 1.78 m tall.

Awards and achievements
Preceded by (Venezuela) Vivian Urdaneta	Miss International; 2001	Succeeded by (Lebanon) Christina Sawaya
