= Miss International 2001 =

Beauty pageant held in Japan

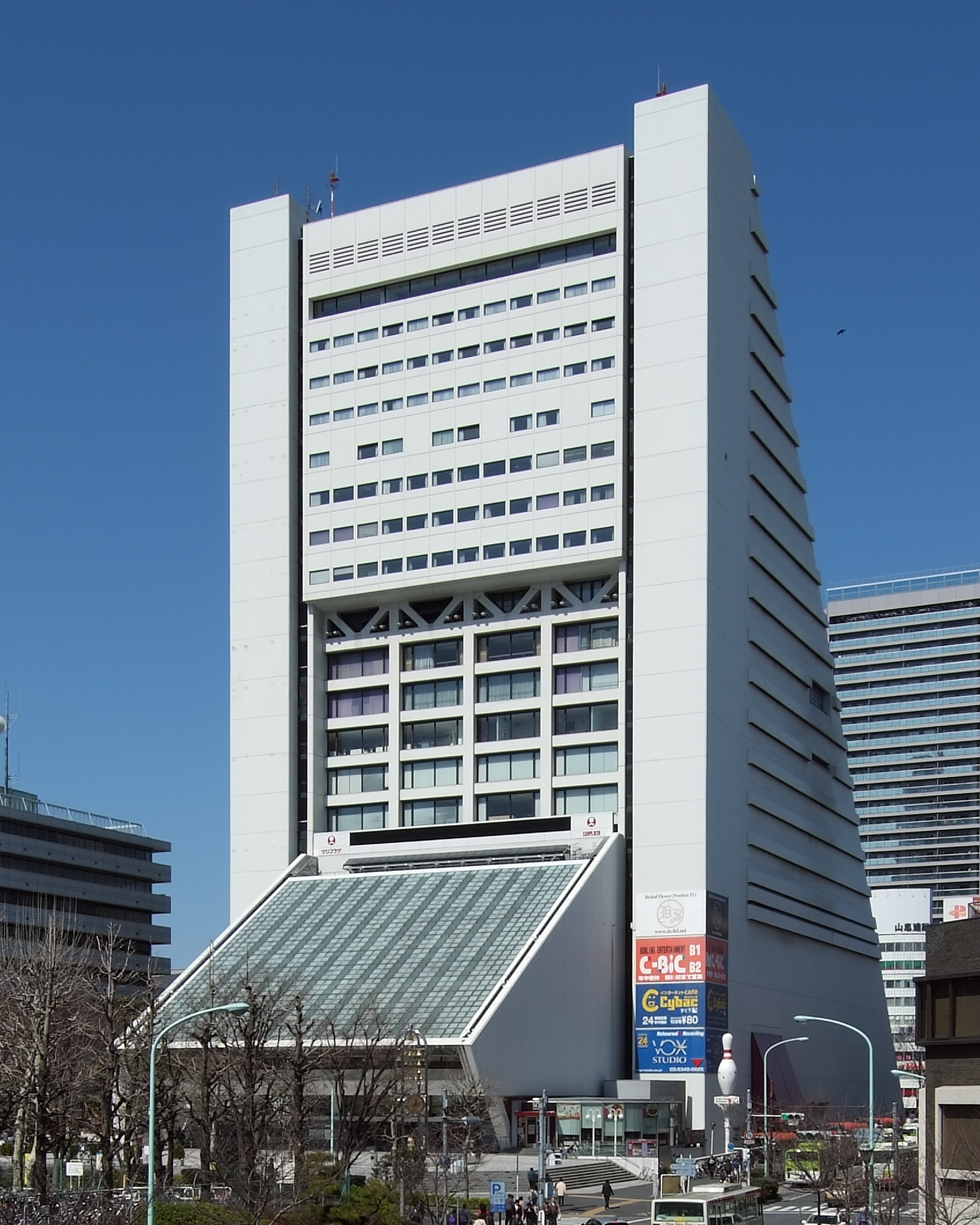
- Date: October 4, 2001
- Presenters: Masumi Okada; Yukie Sakai
- Venue: Nakano Sun Plaza, Nakano, Tokyo, Japan
- Broadcaster: TV Tokyo
- Entrants: 52
- Placements: 15
- Debuts: Mongolia
- Withdrawals: Egypt; Guam; Honduras; Lebanon; Moldova; Nepal; Panama; Portugal; South Africa; Tahiti; Taiwan; Togo
- Returns: Chile; Dominican Republic; Great Britain; Holland; Latvia; Northern Mariana Islands; Yugoslavia
- Winner: Małgorzata Rożniecka; Poland

Miss International 2001, the 41st Miss International pageant, was held on October 4, 2001 at the Nakano Sun Plaza in Tokyo, Japan. At the end of the event, Vivian Urdaneta of Venezuela crowned her successor Małgorzata Rożniecka of Poland.

== Results ==
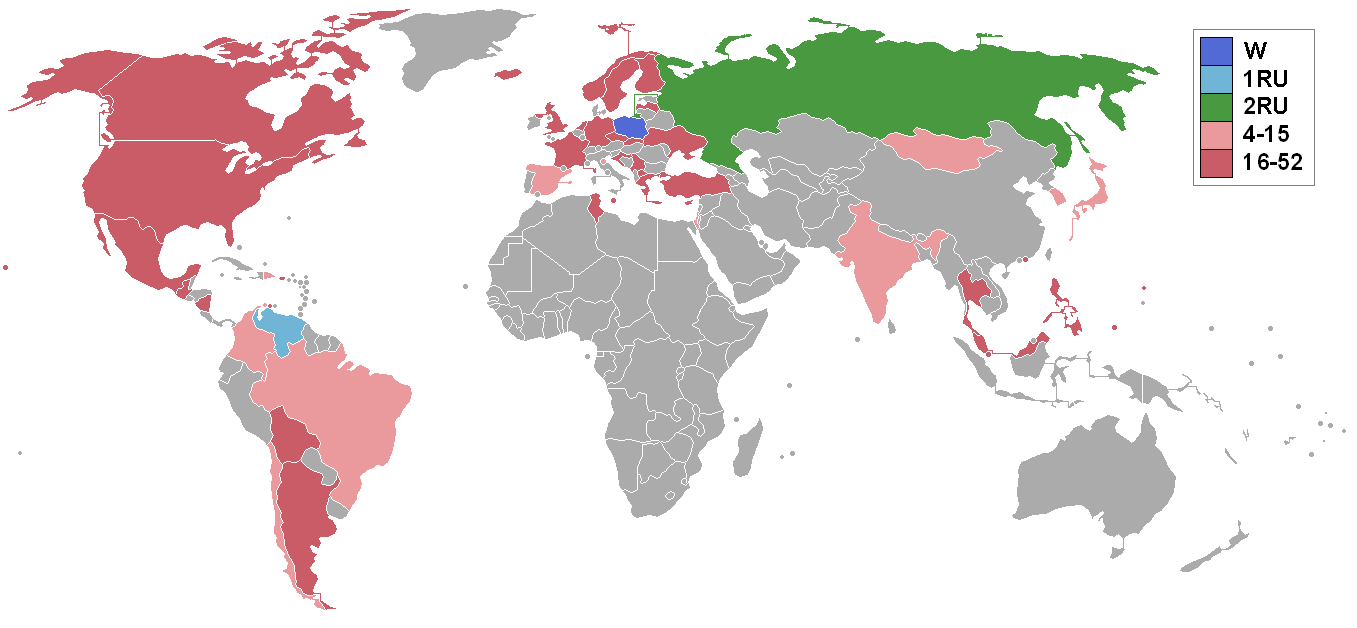
Countries and territories which sent delegates and results

=== Placements ===
Placement	Contestant
Miss International 2001	Poland – Małgorzata Rożniecka
1st runner-up	Venezuela – Aura Zambrano
2nd runner-up	Russia – Tatiana Pavlova
Top 15	Aruba – Daphne Croes; Brazil – Fernanda Tinti; Chile – Paula Orchard; Colombia – Rocío Stevenson; Dominican Republic – Bélgica Cury; India – Kanwal Toor; Israel – Dikla Elkabetz; Japan – Hanako Suzuki; Mongolia – Sansarmaa Luvsandoo; San Marino – Marzia Bellesso; South Korea – Baek Myoung-hee; Spain – Ayola Molina

== Contestants ==
Fifty-two contestants competed for the title.

Country/Territory	Contestant	Age (Note: Ages during the competition)	Hometown
Argentina	María Victoria Branda	19	Buenos Aires
Aruba	Daphne Croes	23	Oranjestad
Bolivia	Priscilla Quiroga	21	La Paz
Brazil	Fernanda Tinti	19	Esmeraldas
Canada	Shauna Olechow	23	–
Chile	Paula Orchard	22	Santiago
Colombia	Rocio Stevenson	22	Cartagena
Croatia	Martina Poljak	21	Zagreb
Curaçao	Vanessa van Arendonk	20	Willemstad
Cyprus	Maria Alecou Hadzivassiliou	19	Nicosia
Czech Republic	Andrea Vranová	20	Ústecký
Dominican Republic	Judith Cury	19	Santo Domingo Este
Finland	Hanna Pajulammi	21	Helsinki
France	Nawal Benhlal	21	Lyon
Germany	Anna Ziemski	20	Berlin
Great Britain	Michelle Watson	20	Motherwell
Greece	Fotini Kokari	19	Athens
Guatemala	Rosa Maria Castañeda	20	Chiquimula
Hawaii	Yoon Hee Jenny Lee	23	Honolulu
Holland	Caroline Heijboer	25	Amsterdam
Hong Kong	Heidi Chu	24	Hong Kong
Iceland	Iris Dögg Oddsdóttir	18	Reykjavík
India	Kanwal Toor	23	Delhi
Israel	Dikla Elkabetz	19	–
Japan	Hanako Suzuki	23	Saitama
Latvia	Laura Vīksna	22	Riga
Macedonia	Dragana Klopcevska	21	Skopje
Malaysia	Cheah Teck Yoong	20	Penang
Malta	Ruth Spiteri	19	Valletta
Mexico	Irma Ríos	23	Mexico City
Mongolia	Sansarmaa Luvsandoo	25	Ulaanbaatar
Nicaragua	Renneé Dávila	24	Managua
Northern Mariana Islands	Rowina Ogo	22	Saipan
Norway	Siv Hegerland	22	Oslo
Palau	Indira Isikl Kazuma	20	Koror
Philippines	Maricarl Tolosa	22	Marikina
Poland	Małgorzata Rożniecka	23	Szczecin
Puerto Rico	Lorna Otero	22	San Juan
Russia	Tatiana Pavlova	–	Tatarstan
San Marino	Marzia Bellesso	24	San Marino
Singapore	Juley Binte Abdullah	23	Singapore
Slovakia	Barbara Pappová	19	Šaľa
South Korea	Baek Myoung-hee	19	Seoul
Spain	Ayola Molina	20	Castellón
Sweden	Sara Nicole Cameron	21	Stockholm
Thailand	Kanithakan Saengprachaksakula	24	Bangkok
Tunisia	Leila Oualha	23	Tunis
Turkey	Ece F. Incedursun	18	Istanbul
Ukraine	Natalia Bakulina	18	Kyiv
United States	Eleana Thompson	19	Lake Elsinore
Venezuela	Aura Zambrano	20	San Cristóbal
Yugoslavia	Iva Milivojević	20	Belgrade
