= Jordi Canals =

Economist, professor, author

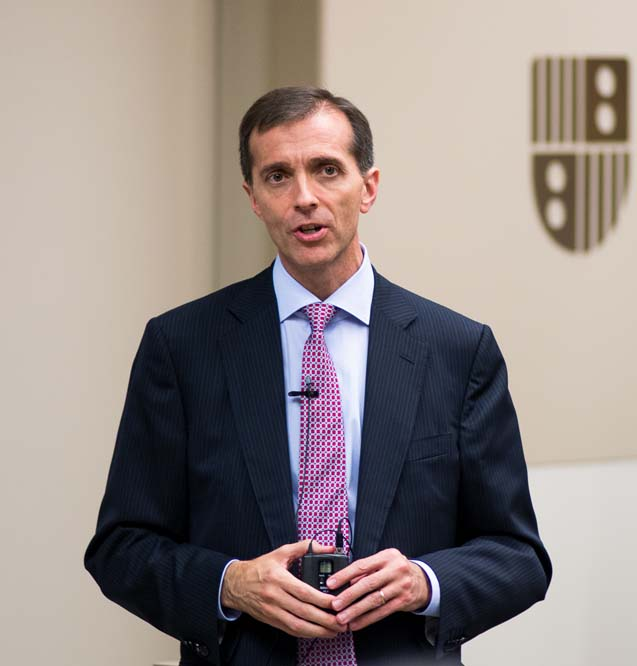
- Jordi Canals, IESE
- Born: 1960 (age 64–65); Barcelona
- Occupation(s): Economist, professor, author

Jordi Canals (born 1960 in Barcelona) is a former Dean of IESE Business School – University of Navarra, where he is also Professor of Economics and General Management.

== Biography ==
He holds a PhD in Economics from the University of Barcelona, awarded as Best PhD Thesis. He is a scholar in the areas of strategic management, corporate governance and globalization.

He is the author of numerous books and academic articles, including Leadership Development in a Global World: The Role of Companies and Business Schools (2013), The Future of Leadership Development (2011), Building Respected Companies (2010), Managing Corporate Growth (2001).

Prof. Canals served as Guest Scholar at the International Monetary Fund, Visiting Scholar at the World Bank, Post-Doctoral Fellow at the Harvard Business School and Guest Scholar at the Brookings Institution.

He is a board member of the European Foundation for Management Development, the Global Foundation for Management Development, the Academy for Business and Society, and a founding member of the European Shadow Financial Regulatory Committee. Formerly, he served on the board of Graduate Management Admission Council and the European Institute for Advanced Studies in Management. Prof. Canals was also a member of the Corporate Governance Commission set up by the Spanish Government in July 2002.

== IESE Business School's Dean 2001–2016 ==
As IESE Business School's Dean, Prof. Jordi Canals worked with his colleagues to help develop IESE in four areas: internationalization, ideas, innovation and impact.

In 2015 the school offers MBA, Executive MBA and Executive Programs in Barcelona, Munich, New York and São Paulo, and works with partners in China, Kenia and Mexico.

In the field of academic research the school has established new Academic Chairs and Research Centers, to achieve by 2015 the 21 chairs and 14 centers.

During this period it has been extended development co-operation, especially through The Africa initiative. IESE contributes to the development of local businessmen, entrepreneurs and leaders, and gives support to several recent schools of management: Lagos Business School (Pan-Atlantic University, Nigeria), Strathmore Business School (Strathmore University, Kenya) and MDE Business School (Ivory Coast).

In 2008 IESE Business School celebrated its 50th anniversary and in 2014, the half century of the Harvard-IESE Academic Committee.

In March 2016 Jordi Canals announced he would step down as IESE Dean in August and return to his position as professor. Franz Heukamp is Canals successor from 1 September 2016.

== Publications ==
- Building Respected Companies; Rethinking Business Leadership and the Purpose of the Firm – Cambridge University Press, 2010, Hardback, ISBN 9780521192101
