= Taniec z gwiazdami season 15 =

Taniec z gwiazdami
- Season 15
- Hosted by: Krzysztof Ibisz; Anna Głogowska
- Judges: Andrzej Grabowski; Iwona Pavlović; Beata Tyszkiewicz; Michał Malitowski
- Celebrity winner: Agnieszka Sienkiewicz
- Professional winner: Stefano Terrazzino
- No. of episodes: 11

Release
- Original network: Polsat
- Original release: 5 September – 14 November 2014

Season chronology
- ← Previous; 14 Next → 16

The 15th season of Taniec z Gwiazdami, the Polish edition of Dancing With the Stars format, started on 5 September 2014. This is the second season aired on Polsat. Krzysztof Ibisz and Anna Głogowska returned as hosts and Beata Tyszkiewicz, Iwona Pavlović, Michał Malitowski and Andrzej Grabowski returned as judges.

On 14 November, Agnieszka Sienkiewicz and her partner Stefano Terrazzino were crowned the champions. With four wins, Terrazzino is currently the most successful professional dancer in history of the show. It was also his second consecutive win of the show.

== Couples ==
Celebrity	Occupation	Professional partner	Status
Marta Wierzbicka	Na Wspólnej actress	Łukasz Czarnecki	Eliminated 1st on 5 September 2014
Honorata Skarbek	Singer and fashion blogger	Kamil Kuroczko	Eliminated 2nd on 12 September 2014
Artur Dziurman	Actor and director	Valeriya Zhuravlyova	Eliminated 3rd on 19 September 2014
Joanna Orleańska	Film and television actress	Przemysław Modrzyński	Eliminated 4th on 26 September 2014
Michał Koterski	Pierwsza miłość actor and comedian	Janja Lesar	Eliminated 5th on 3 October 2014
Marcin Miller	Boys singer	Nina Tyrka; Magdalena Soszyńska-Michno (Week 6)	Eliminated 6th on 17 October 2014
Rafał Maślak	Mister Poland 2014 and model	Agnieszka Kaczorowska; Hanna Żudziewicz (Week 6)	Eliminated 7th on 17 October 2014
Jan Mela	Polar explorer and activist	Magdalena Soszyńska-Michno; Nina Tyrka (Week 6)	Eliminated 8th on 24 October 2014
Mateusz Banasiuk	Pierwsza miłość actor	Hanna Żudziewicz; Agnieszka Kaczorowska (Week 6)	Eliminated 9th on 31 October 2014
Marcelina Zawadzka	Miss Polonia 2011, model and television presenter	Rafał Maserak; Stefano Terrazzino (Week 6)	Third place on 7 November 2014
Anna Wyszkoni	Former Łzy singer	Jan Kliment; Rafał Maserak (Week 6)	Runners-up on 14 November 2014
Agnieszka Sienkiewicz	M jak miłość and Przyjaciółki actress	Stefano Terrazzino; Jan Kliment (Week 6)	Winners on 14 November 2014

== Scores ==
Couple	Place	1	2	3	4	5	6	7	6+7	8	9	10		11
Agnieszka & Stefano	1	39†	29	35	37	39+36=75†	35	31+5=36	71	27+36=63	31+35=66‡	33+32=65‡	+40=105‡	40+37+40=117‡
Anna & Jan	2	39†	38†	38	39†	39+35=74	40†	37+4=41	81†	37+32=69	40+38=78	37+37=74†	—	40+40+40=120†
Marcelina & Rafał	3	32	33	39†	36	38+35=73	32	37+6=43†	75	38+33=71†	40+40=80†	36+35=71	+40=111†	
Mateusz & Hanna	4	32	30	33	38	34+36=70	33	33+7=40	73	33+32=65	34+36=70			
Jan & Magdalena	5	27	29	34	28	32+35=67	24‡	24+2=26‡	50‡	28+27=55‡				
Rafał & Agnieszka	6	28	23	25	30	29+36=65	26	28+1=29	55					
Marcin & Nina	7	30	23	26	27	27+35=62	37	29+3=32	69					
Michał & Janja	8	24‡	20‡	24‡	21‡	23+36=59‡								
Joanna & Przemysław	9	27	33	26	25									
Artur & Valeriya	10	25	23	26										
Honorata & Kamil	11	27	30											
Marta & Łukasz	12	25												

Red numbers indicate the lowest score for each week.
Green numbers indicate the highest score for each week.
indicates the couple eliminated that week.
indicates the returning couple that finished in the bottom two.
indicates the returning couple that was the last to be called safe.
indicates the couple saved from elimination by immunity
indicates the winning couple.
indicates the runner-up.
indicates the couple in third place.

Notes:

Week 1: Anna Wyszkoni scored 39 out of 40 on her first dance (Salsa). Agnieszka Sienkiewicz also scored 39 out of 40 on her first dance (Contemporary). It was the highest score ever in Week 1. Michał Koterski got 24 points for his Viennese Waltz, making it the lowest score of the week. Marta & Łukasz were eliminated despite being 1 points from the bottom.

Week 2: Anna Wyszkoni got 38 points for her Tango, making it the highest score of the week. Michał Koterski got 20 points for his Cha-cha-cha, making it the lowest score of the week. Honorata & Kamil were eliminated despite being 10 points from the bottom.

Week 3: All couples danced to Latin songs. Marcelina Zawadzka got 39 points for her Rumba, making it the highest score of the week. Michał Koterski got 24 points for his Salsa, making it the lowest score of the week. Artur & Valeriya were eliminated despite being 2 points from the bottom.

Week 4: Anna Wyszkoni got 39 points for her Rumba, making it the highest score of the week. Michał Koterski got 21 points for his Swing, making it the lowest score of the week. Joanna & Przemysław were eliminated despite being 4 points from the bottom.

Week 5: Anna Wyszkoni got 39 points for her American Smooth, making it the highest score of the week. Agnieszka Sienkiewicz also got 39 points for her Paso Doble. Michał Koterski got 23 points for his Tango, making it the lowest score of the week. There were two Latin Freestyle team dances. The teams were chosen by the winner and runner-up couples in 4th episode – Anna & Jan and Agnieszka & Stefano. Anna Wyszkoni and her team scored 35 points. Agnieszka Sienkiewicz and her team scored 36 points. Michał & Janja were eliminetaed.

Week 6: The couples were required to switch professional partners this week and learn a new style of dance. Anna Wyszkoni got the season's first perfect score for the Cha-cha-cha. Jan Mela got 24 points for his Viennese Waltz, making it the lowest score of the week and his lowest score ever. There was no elimination this week.

Week 7: Marcelina Zawadzka got 37 points for her Jive, making it the highest score of the week. Anna Wyszkoni also got 37 points for her Contemporary. Jan Mela got 24 points for his Argentine Tango, making it the lowest score of the week and his lowest score ever. There was also Rock and Roll marathon. Mateusz Banasiuk got 7 out of 7 points for the marathon. Marcin & Nina were eliminated despite being 19 points from the bottom. Rafał & Agnieszka were also eliminated despite being 5 points from the bottom.

Week 8: Marcelina Zawadzka got 38 points for her Waltz, making it the highest score of the week. Jan Mela got 27 points for his Disco, making it the lowest score of the week. Agnieszka Sienkiewicz also got 27 points for her Viennese Waltz making it her lowest score ever. Jan & Magdalena were eliminated.

Week 9: Marcelina Zawadzka received her first perfect score for her Quickstep and second for her Rumba. Anna Wyszkoni received her second perfect score for the Cha-cha-cha. Agnieszka Sienkiewicz got 31 points for her Cha-cha-cha making it the lowest score of the week. Mateusz & Hanna were eliminated despite being 4 points from the bottom.

Week 10: Agnieszka Sienkiewicz got 33 points for her Samba and 32 points for her Pop making it the lowest scores of the week. Anna Wyszkoni got 37 points for her Rumba and Pop making it the highest scores of the week. In the dance-off, Marcelina Zawadzka received her third perfect score for Viennese Waltz. Agnieszka Sienkiewicz received her first perfect score for the Rumba.

Week 11: Both couples had to perform three dances: their favorite dance, judges' choice dance and a Freestyle. Anna Wyszkoni got 120 out of 120 points. Anna Wyszkoni received her 3rd, 4th and 5th perfect score for the American Smooth, Salsa and Freestyle. Agnieszka Sienkiewicz received her 2nd and 3rd perfect score for Contemporary and Freestyle. Agnieszka & Stefano won the competition. It was the 9th time the winner was not on the first place according to the judges' scoreboard. Stefano Terrazzino won the competition for the 4th time. This was also Stefano Terrazzino's second win in a row after he won the previous season with Aneta Zając.

== Average score chart ==
This table only counts for dances scored on a traditional 40-points scale.

Rank by average	Place	Couple	Total points	Number of dances	Average
1	2	Anna & Jan	646	17	38.0
2	3	Marcelina & Rafał	544	15	36.3
3	1	Agnieszka & Stefano	632	18	35.1
4	4	Mateusz & Hanna	404	12	33.7
5	7	Marcin & Nina	234	8	29.3
6	5	Jan & Magdalena	288	10	28.8
7	11	Honorata & Kamil	57	2	28.5
8	6	Rafał & Agnieszka	225	8	28.1
9	9	Joanna & Przemysław	111	4	27.8
10	12	Marta & Łukasz	25	1	25.0
11	10	Artur & Valeriya	74	3	24.7
11	8	Michał & Janja	148	6	24.7

== Highest and lowest scoring performances ==
The best and worst performances in each dance according to the judges' 40-point scale are as follows:

Dance	Best dancer(s)	Highest score	Worst dancer(s)	Lowest score
Jive	Marcelina Zawadzka	37	Marcin Miller; Rafał Maślak	30
Contemporary	Agnieszka Sienkiewicz	40	Jan Mela	32
Charleston	Marcin Miller	37	Rafał Maślak	28
Waltz	Marcelina Zawadzka	38	Marcin Miller	27
Salsa	Anna Wyszkoni	40	Michał Koterski	24
Foxtrot	Agnieszka Sienkiewicz	35	Jan Mela; Agnieszka Sienkiewicz	29
Paso Doble	Agnieszka Sienkiewicz	39	Marta Wierzbicka	25
Viennese Waltz	Marcelina Zawadzka	40	Michał Koterski; Jan Mela	24
Rumba	Marcelina Zawadzka; Agnieszka Sienkiewicz	40	Rafał Maślak; Artur Dziurman	23
Quickstep	Marcelina Zawadzka	40	Honorata Skarbek	27
Tango	Anna Wyszkoni	38	Marcin Miller; Michał Koterski	23
Cha-cha-cha	Anna Wyszkoni	40	Michał Koterski	20
Samba	Anna Wyszkoni	38	Rafał Maślak	25
American Smooth	Anna Wyszkoni	40	Joanna Orleańska	25
Swing	Michał Koterski	21		
Argentine Tango	Marcelina Zawadzka	32	Jan Mela	24
Team dance	Agnieszka Sienkiewicz; Michał Koterski; Mateusz Banasiuk; Rafał Maślak	36	Anna Wyszkoni; Marcelina Zawadzka; Jan Mela; Marcin Miller	35
Rock and Roll Marathon	Mateusz Banasiuk	7	Rafał Maślak	1
Uncommon styles	Agnieszka Sienkiewicz (Bollywood)	36	Jan Mela (Disco)	27
Pop	Anna Wyszkoni	37	Agnieszka Sienkiewicz	32
Freestyle	Anna Wyszkoni; Agnieszka Sienkiewicz	40		

== Couples' highest and lowest scoring dances ==
According to the traditional 40-point scale:

Couples	Highest scoring dance(s)	Lowest scoring dance(s)
Agnieszka & Stefano	Rumba, Contemporary, Freestyle (40)	Viennese Waltz (27)
Anna & Jan	Cha-cha-cha (twice), American Smooth, Salsa, Freestyle (40)	Dancehall (32)
Marcelina & Rafał	Rumba, Quickstep, Viennese Waltz (40)	Waltz, Argentine Tango (32)
Mateusz & Hanna	Contemporary (38)	Rumba (30)
Jan & Magdalena	Team Dance (35)	Viennese Waltz, Argentine Tango (24)
Rafał & Agnieszka	Team Dance (36)	Rumba (23)
Marcin & Nina	Charleston (37)	Tango (23)
Michał & Janja	Team Dance (36)	Cha-cha-cha (20)
Joanna & Przemysław	Tango (33)	American Smooth (25)
Artur & Valeriya	Cha-cha-cha (26)	Rumba (23)
Honorata & Kamil	Cha-cha-cha (30)	Quickstep (27)
Marta & Łukasz	Paso Doble (25)	Paso Doble (25)

== Weekly scores ==
Unless indicated otherwise, individual judges scores in the charts below (given in parentheses) are listed in this order from left to right: Andrzej Grabowski, Iwona Pavlović, Beata Tyszkiewicz and Michał Malitowski.

=== Week 1: Season Premiere ===
Running order

Couple	Score	Dance	Music	Result
Marcin & Nina	30 (8,7,9,6)	Jive	"Mambo No. 5"—Lou Bega	Safe
Agnieszka & Stefano	39 (10,10,10,9)	Contemporary	"Napraw"—LemON	Safe
Rafał & Agnieszka	28 (9,5,8,6)	Charleston	"We No Speak Americano"—Yolanda Be Cool & DCUP	Safe
Marcelina & Rafał	32 (9,7,9,7)	Waltz	"If You Don't Know Me by Now"—Harold Melvin & the Blue Notes	Safe
Anna & Jan	39 (10,9,10,10)	Salsa	"Hips Don't Lie"—Shakira featuring Wyclef Jean	Safe
Mateusz & Hanna	32 (9,6,8,9)	Foxtrot	"Fly Me to the Moon"—Frank Sinatra	Safe
Marta & Łukasz	25 (8,4,8,5)	Paso Doble	"Wrecking Ball"—Miley Cyrus	Eliminated
Michał & Janja	24 (7,3,10,4)	Viennese Waltz	"Crazy"—Aerosmith	Safe
Joanna & Przemysław	27 (8,6,8,5)	Rumba	"Stay"—Rihanna	Last to be called safe
Honorata & Kamil	27 (8,5,8,6)	Quickstep	"Nic do stracenia"—Mrozu & Sound'n'Grace	Safe
Artur & Valeriya	25 (8,4,8,5)	Tango	"El Tango de Roxanne"—from Moulin Rouge!	Safe
Jan & Magdalena	27 (8,6,8,5)	Cha-cha-cha	"Sunny"—Boney M.	Safe

=== Week 2: Love Night ===
Running order

Couple	Score	Dance	Music	Result
Honorata & Kamil	30 (9,7,8,6)	Cha-cha-cha	"Love Me Again"—John Newman	Eliminated
Jan & Magdalena	29 (8,6,9,6)	Foxtrot	"Cherish"—Madonna	Safe
Anna & Jan	38 (10,10,10,8)	Tango	"Tabakiera"—Kayah & Goran Bregović	Safe
Michał & Janja	20 (7,2,7,4)	Cha-cha-cha	"Move in the Right Direction"—Gossip	Safe
Joanna & Przemysław	33 (9,8,9,7)	Tango	"To tylko tango"—Maanam	Last to be called safe
Rafał & Agnieszka	23 (7,4,7,5)	Rumba	"Purple Rain"—Prince and The Revolution	Safe
Mateusz & Hanna	30 (8,7,9,6)	Rumba	"Impossible"—Shontelle	Safe
Marcelina & Rafał	33 (9,8,9,7)	Cha-cha-cha	"Waiting for Tonight"—Jennifer Lopez	Safe
Artur & Valeriya	23 (7,3,7,6)	Rumba	"Trudno tak"—Krzysztof Krawczyk & Edyta Bartosiewicz	Safe
Agnieszka & Stefano	29 (9,6,8,6)	Foxtrot	"I've Got You Under My Skin"—Frank Sinatra	Safe
Marcin & Nina	23 (7,4,7,5)	Tango	"In-tango"—In-Grid	Safe

=== Week 3: Latin Night ===
Running order

Couple	Score	Dance	Music	Result
Agnieszka & Stefano	35 (10,8,10,7)	Rumba	"Bésame Mucho"—Lucho Gatica	Safe
Rafał & Agnieszka	25 (8,5,7,5)	Samba	"Livin' la Vida Loca"—Ricky Martin	Safe
Artur & Valeriya	26 (8,4,7,7)	Cha-cha-cha	"Smooth"—Carlos Santana featuring Rob Thomas	Eliminated
Marcelina & Rafał	39 (10,10,10,9)	Rumba	"Maria Maria"—Carlos Santana featuring The Product G&B	Safe
Michał & Janja	24 (8,4,7,5)	Salsa	"Copacabana"—Barry Manilow	Safe
Marcin & Nina	26 (7,6,7,6)	Cha-cha-cha	"Guantanamera"—Joseíto Fernández	Last to be called safe
Jan & Magdalena	34 (8,10,10,6)	Rumba	"Hero"—Enrique Iglesias	Safe
Anna & Jan	38 (10,9,10,9)	Samba	"Mas que Nada"—Jorge Ben	Safe
Mateusz & Hanna	33 (9,8,8,8)	Paso Doble	"Don't Let Me Be Misunderstood"—The Animals	Safe
Joanna & Przemysław	26 (9,4,7,6)	Cha-cha-cha	"Let's Get Loud"—Jennifer Lopez	Safe

=== Week 4: Most Memorable Year ===
Running order

Couple	Score	Dance	Music	Result
Marcin & Nina	27 (8,6,7,6)	Waltz	"Unchained Melody"—The Righteous Brothers	Last to be called safe
Jan & Magdalena	28 (10,4,8,6)	Paso Doble	"Bring Me to Life"—Evanescence	Safe
Joanna & Przemysław	25 (8,5,7,5)	American Smooth	"Feeling Good"—Nina Simone	Eliminated
Michał & Janja	21 (5,2,10,4)	Swing	"Back to Black"—Amy Winehouse	Safe
Marcelina & Rafał	36 (10,9,10,7)	Viennese Waltz	"Iris"—Goo Goo Dolls	Safe
Rafał & Agnieszka	30 (9,6,8,7)	Jive	"Happy"—Pharrell Williams	Safe
Anna & Jan	39 (9,10,10,10)	Rumba	"Długość dźwięku samotności"—Myslovitz	Winner
Mateusz & Hanna	38 (9,9,10,10)	Contemporary	"People Help the People"—Birdy	Safe
Agnieszka & Stefano	37 (10,9,9,9)	Viennese Waltz	"Everybody Hurts"—R.E.M.	Runner-up

=== Week 5: Team Night ===
The teams were chosen by the winner and runner-up couples in 4th episode – Anna & Jan and Agnieszka & Stefano.

Running order

Couple	Score	Dance	Music	Result
Michał & Janja	23 (5,10,3,5)	Tango	"I Follow Rivers"—Lykke Li	Eliminated
Mateusz & Hanna	34 (10,8,8,8)	Quickstep	"You Can't Hurry Love"—The Supremes	Safe
Agnieszka & Stefano	39 (10,10,10,9)	Paso Doble	"Dirty Diana"—Michael Jackson	Safe
Marcin & Nina	27 (7,7,8,5)	Rumba	"Księżniczka"—Sylwia Grzeszczak	Safe
Marcelina & Rafał	38 (10,9,10,9)	Contemporary	"Let Her Go"—Passenger	Safe
Rafał & Agnieszka	29 (8,7,8,6)	Viennese Waltz	"Bed of Roses"—Bon Jovi	Safe
Anna & Jan	39 (10,9,10,10)	American Smooth	"Empire State of Mind"—Alicia Keys	Safe
Jan & Magdalena	32 (9,8,8,7)	Contemporary	"Beautiful"—Christina Aguilera	Safe
Anna & Jan; Marcelina & Rafał; Jan & Magdalena; Marcin & Nina	35 (8,10,8,9)	Latin Freestyle (Team Loca)	"Loca"—Shakira featuring Dizzee Rascal	
Agnieszka & Stefano; Michał & Janja; Mateusz & Hanna; Rafał & Agnieszka	36 (8,9,10,9)	Latin Freestyle (Team Tępe Dzidy)	"Waka Waka (This Time for Africa)"—Shakira	

=== Week 6: The Switch – Up ===
The couples were required to switch professional partners this week and learn a new style of dance. Due to the nature of the week, no elimination took place at the end of the show. At the end of the show it was revealed that Anna & Jan had the highest combined total of judges' scores and viewer votes, while Mateusz & Hanna had the lowest total.

Running order

Couple	Score	Dance	Music
Mateusz & Agnieszka	33 (10,8,8,7)	Cha-cha-cha	"Poker Face"—Lady Gaga
Jan & Nina	24 (7,3,10,4)	Viennese Waltz	"When a Man Loves a Woman"—Percy Sledge
Agnieszka & Jan	35 (9,8,10,8)	Samba	"Ai Se Eu Te Pego"—Michel Teló
Rafał & Hanna	26 (8,5,8,5)	Tango	"To ostatnia niedziela"—Mieczysław Fogg
Anna & Rafał	40 (10,10,10,10)	Cha-cha-cha	"Counting Stars"—OneRepublic
Marcin & Magdalena	37 (10,9,10,8)	Charleston	"Hot Honey Rag"—John Kander
Marcelina & Stefano	32 (9,7,10,6)	Argentine Tango	"Somebody That I Used to Know"—Gotye featuring Kimbra

=== Week 7: Marathon Night ===
Running order

Couple	Score	Dance	Music	Result
Jan & Magdalena	24 (6,5,8,5)	Argentine Tango	"All of Me"—John Legend	Safe
Agnieszka & Stefano	31 (9,8,8,6)	Quickstep	"I Want You Back"—The Jackson 5	Safe
Rafał & Agnieszka	28 (8,6,8,6)	Cha-cha-cha	"Call Me Maybe"—Carly Rae Jepsen	Eliminated
Marcelina & Rafał	37 (9,10,10,8)	Jive	"I'll Be There for You"—The Rembrandts	Safe
Mateusz & Hanna	33 (8,9,9,7)	Viennese Waltz	"Chodź, przytul, przebacz"—Andrzej Piaseczny	Safe
Marcin & Nina	29 (8,7,8,6)	Paso Doble	"Eye of the Tiger"—Survivor	Eliminated
Anna & Jan	37 (9,10,10,8)	Contemporary	"Nad przepaścią"—Bracia	Safe
Mateusz & Hanna; Marcelina & Rafał; Agnieszka & Stefano; Anna & Jan; Marcin & Nina; Jan & Magdalena; Rafał & Agnieszka	7; 6; 5; 4; 3; 2; 1	Rock and Roll Marathon	"Rock Around the Clock"—Bill Haley & His Comets	

=== Week 8: New Dance Styles ===
Running order

Couple	Score	Dance	Music	Result
Agnieszka & Stefano	27 (8,6,8,5)	Viennese Waltz	"Never Tear Us Apart"—INXS	Safe
Agnieszka & Stefano	36 (10,9,9,8)	Bollywood	"Jai Ho"—A. R. Rahman	Safe
Anna & Jan	37 (9,10,10,8)	Samba	"María"—Ricky Martin	Safe
Anna & Jan	32 (9,8,8,7)	Dancehall	"Run the Show"—Kat DeLuna featuring Busta Rhymes	Safe
Marcelina & Rafał	38 (10,9,10,9)	Waltz	"Nothing Compares 2 U"—Sinéad O'Connor	Safe
Marcelina & Rafał	33 (9,8,8,8)	Hip-hop	"Sweet Dreams"—Beyoncé	Safe
Jan & Magdalena	28 (8,6,8,6)	Paso Doble	"Story of My Life"—One Direction	Eliminated
Jan & Magdalena	27 (8,6,8,5)	Disco	"Disco Inferno"—The Trammps	Eliminated
Mateusz & Hanna	33 (9,8,8,8)	Foxtrot	"This Will Be (An Everlasting Love)"—Natalie Cole	Last to be called safe
Mateusz & Hanna	32 (9,7,9,7)	Boogie-woogie	"Candyman"—Christina Aguilera	Last to be called safe

=== Week 9: Halloween Week ===
Running order

Couple	Score	Dance	Music	Result
Agnieszka & Stefano	31 (9,6,10,6)	Cha-cha-cha	"Thriller"—Michael Jackson	Last to be called safe
Agnieszka & Stefano	35 (10,8,10,7)	Foxtrot	"The Addams Family Theme"—Vic Mizzy	Last to be called safe
Mateusz & Hanna	34 (10,7,9,8)	Contemporary	"Total Eclipse of the Heart"—Bonnie Tyler	Eliminated
Mateusz & Hanna	36 (10,8,9,9)	Salsa	"Cuban Pete"—Jim Carrey	Eliminated
Marcelina & Rafał	40 (10,10,10,10)	Quickstep	"Day-O"—Harry Belafonte	Safe
Marcelina & Rafał	40 (10,10,10,10)	Rumba	"Falling"—Julee Cruise	Safe
Anna & Jan	40 (10,10,10,10)	Cha-cha-cha	"Ghostbusters"—Ray Parker Jr.	Safe
Anna & Jan	38 (10,9,10,9)	Paso Doble	"Running Up That Hill"—Kate Bush	Safe

=== Week 10: Pop Week (Semi-final) ===
Running order

Couple	Score	Dance	Music	Result
Marcelina & Rafał	36 (10,8,10,8)	Cha-cha-cha	"I Will Survive"—Gloria Gaynor	Bottom two
Marcelina & Rafał	35 (9,9,9,8)	Pop	"Crazy in Love"—Beyoncé featuring Jay-Z	Bottom two
Anna & Jan	37 (9,9,10,9)	Rumba	"Love Is All Around"—The Troggs	Safe
Anna & Jan	37 (10,8,10,9)	Pop	"Billie Jean"—Michael Jackson	Safe
Agnieszka & Stefano	33 (9,7,10,7)	Samba	"Bamboleo"—Gipsy Kings	Bottom two
Agnieszka & Stefano	32 (8,8,9,7)	Pop	"Don't Stop the Music"—Rihanna	Bottom two

Dance-off

Running order

Couple	Score	Dance	Music	Result
Marcelina & Rafał	40 (10,10,10,10)	Viennese Waltz	"Iris"—Goo Goo Dolls	Eliminated
Agnieszka & Stefano	40 (10,10,10,10)	Rumba	"Bésame Mucho"—Lucho Gatica	Safe

=== Week 11: Season Finale ===
Running order

Couple	Score	Dance	Music	Result
Anna & Jan	40 (10,10,10,10)	American Smooth	"Empire State of Mind"—Alicia Keys	Runners-up
Anna & Jan	40 (10,10,10,10)	Salsa	"Hips Don't Lie"—Shakira featuring Wyclef Jean	Runners-up
Anna & Jan	40 (10,10,10,10)	Freestyle	"I Will Always Love You"—Whitney Houston "I'm Every Woman"—Whitney Houston "Queen of the Night"—Whitney Houston "I Have Nothing"—Whitney Houston	Runners-up
Agnieszka & Stefano	40 (10,10,10,10)	Contemporary	"Napraw"—LemON	Winners
Agnieszka & Stefano	37 (9,9,10,9)	Paso Doble	"Dirty Diana"—Michael Jackson	Winners
Agnieszka & Stefano	40 (10,10,10,10)	Freestyle	"Pirates of the Caribbean Theme"—from Pirates of the Caribbean	Winners

== Dance chart ==
The celebrities and professional partners danced one of these routines for each corresponding week:

- Week 1 (Season Premiere): Cha-cha-cha, Waltz, Quickstep, Rumba, Jive, Tango, Foxtrot, Paso Doble, Viennese Waltz, Salsa, Contemporary, Charleston
- Week 2 (Love Night): One unlearned dance
- Week 3 (Latin Night): One unlearned dance (introducing Samba)
- Week 4 (Most Memorable Year): One unlearned dance (introducing Swing, American Smooth)
- Week 5 (Team Night): One unlearned dance and Team Freestyle
- Week 6 (Partners Switch – Up): One unlearned dance (introducing Argentine Tango)
- Week 7 (Marathon Night): One unlearned dance and Rock and Roll marathon
- Week 8 (New Dance Styles): One repeated dance and one unlearned uncommon dance (Boogie-woogie, Dancehall, Bollywood, Hip-hop, Disco)
- Week 9 (Halloween Night): One unlearned dance and one repeated dance
- Week 10 (Semi-final: Pop Night): One repeated dance, Pop dance and dance-off
- Week 11 (Season Finale): Couple's favorite dance of the season, judges' choice and Freestyle

Couple	1	2	3	4	5		6	7		8		9		10			11		
Agnieszka & Stefano	Contemporary	Foxtrot	Rumba	Viennese Waltz	Paso Doble	Latin Freestyle (Team Tępe Dzidy)	Samba (Agnieszka & Jan)	Quickstep	Rock and Roll; Marathon	Viennese Waltz	Bollywood	Cha-cha-cha	Foxtrot	Samba	Pop	Rumba	Contemporary	Paso Doble	Freestyle
Anna & Jan	Salsa	Tango	Samba	Rumba	American Smooth	Latin Freestyle (Team Loca)	Cha-cha-cha (Anna & Rafał)	Contemporary	Rock and Roll; Marathon	Samba	Dancehall	Cha-cha-cha	Paso Doble	Rumba	Pop	- (Immunity)	American Smooth	Salsa	Freestyle
Marcelina & Rafał	Waltz	Cha-cha-cha	Rumba	Viennese Waltz	Contemporary	Latin Freestyle (Team Loca)	Argentine Tango (Marcelina & Stefano)	Jive	Rock and Roll; Marathon	Waltz	Hip-hop	Quickstep	Rumba	Cha-cha-cha	Pop	Viennese Waltz			Cha-cha-cha
Mateusz & Hanna	Foxtrot	Rumba	Paso Doble	Contemporary	Quickstep	Latin Freestyle (Team Tępe Dzidy)	Cha-cha-cha (Mateusz & Agnieszka)	Viennese Waltz	Rock and Roll; Marathon	Foxtrot	Boogie-woogie	Contemporary	Salsa						Viennese Waltz
Jan & Magdalena	Cha-cha-cha	Foxtrot	Rumba	Paso Doble	Contemporary	Latin Freestyle (Team Loca)	Viennese Waltz (Jan & Nina)	Argentine Tango	Rock and Roll; Marathon	Paso Doble	Disco								Viennese Waltz
Rafał & Agnieszka	Charleston	Rumba	Samba	Jive	Viennese Waltz	Latin Freestyle (Team Tępe Dzidy)	Tango (Rafał & Hanna)	Cha-cha-cha	Rock and Roll; Marathon										Viennese Waltz
Marcin & Nina	Jive	Tango	Cha-cha-cha	Waltz	Rumba	Latin Freestyle (Team Loca)	Charleston (Marcin & Magdalena)	Paso Doble	Rock and Roll; Marathon										Viennese Waltz
Michał & Janja	Viennese Waltz	Cha-cha-cha	Salsa	Swing	Tango	Latin Freestyle (Team Tępe Dzidy)													Viennese Waltz
Joanna & Przemysław	Rumba	Tango	Cha-cha-cha	American Smooth															Cha-cha-cha
Artur & Valeriya	Tango	Rumba	Cha-cha-cha																Viennese Waltz
Honorata & Kamil	Quickstep	Cha-cha-cha																	Cha-cha-cha
Marta & Łukasz	Paso Doble																		Cha-cha-cha

Highest scoring dance
Lowest scoring dance
Performed, but not scored

== Call-out order ==
Order	Week 1	Week 2	Week 3	Week 4	Week 5	Week 6+7	Week 8	Week 9	Week 10	Week 11
1	Honorata & Kamil	Jan & Magdalena	Anna & Jan	Anna & Jan	Agnieszka & Stefano	Mateusz & Hanna	Agnieszka & Stefano	Marcelina & Rafał	Anna & Jan	Agnieszka & Stefano
2	Anna & Jan	Anna & Jan	Marcelina & Rafał	Agnieszka & Stefano	Anna & Jan	Marcin & Nina	Marcelina & Rafał	Anna & Jan	Agnieszka & Stefano	Anna & Jan
3	Agnieszka & Stefano	Agnieszka & Stefano	Agnieszka & Stefano	Jan & Magdalena	Marcin & Nina	Anna & Jan	Anna & Jan	Agnieszka & Stefano	Marcelina & Rafał	
4	Jan & Magdalena	Marcelina & Rafał	Joanna & Przemysław	Mateusz & Hanna	Rafał & Agnieszka	Marcelina & Rafał	Mateusz & Hanna	Mateusz & Hanna		
5	Marcin & Nina	Rafał & Agnieszka	Jan & Magdalena	Marcelina & Rafał	Jan & Magdalena	Agnieszka & Stefano	Jan & Magdalena			
6	Rafał & Agnieszka	Mateusz & Hanna	Michał & Janja	Rafał & Agnieszka	Michał & Janja	Rafał & Agnieszka				
7	Mateusz & Hanna	Michał & Janja	Rafał & Agnieszka	Michał & Janja	Mateusz & Hanna	Jan & Magdalena				
8	Michał & Janja	Artur & Valeriya	Mateusz & Hanna	Marcin & Nina	Marcelina & Rafał					
9	Artur & Valeriya	Marcin & Nina	Marcin & Nina	Joanna & Przemysław						
10	Marcelina & Rafał	Joanna & Przemysław	Artur & Valeriya							
11	Joanna & Przemysław	Honorata & Kamil								
12	Marta & Łukasz									

This couple came in first place with the judges.
This couple came in last place with the judges.
This couple came in last place with the judges and was eliminated.
This couple was eliminated.
This couple won the competition.
This couple came in second in the competition.
This couple came in third in the competition.

== Guest performances ==
Date	Artist(s)	Song(s)	Dancers
5 September 2014	Tomasz Szymuś's Orchestra	"Dance Again"	All professional dancers and VOLT dance group
19 September 2014	Tomasz Szymuś's Orchestra	"(I Wanna Give You) Devotion"	Michał Malitowski and Joanna Leunis
10 October 2014	Tomasz Szymuś's Orchestra	"A Little Party Never Killed Nobody (All We Got)"	All professional dancers and celebrities
10 October 2014	Tomasz Szymuś's Orchestra	"Stay with Me"	Anna Głogowska and Tomasz Barański
10 October 2014	Anna Wyszkoni	"Biegnij przed siebie"	—
17 October 2014	Piotr Cugowski	"Nad przepaścią"	Anna Wyszkoni and Jan Kliment
17 October 2014	Ewa Farna	"Tajna misja"	Valeriya Zhuravlyova and Przemysław Modrzyński
24 October 2014	Ewelina Lisowska	"Na obcy ląd"	VOLT dance group
31 October 2014	Oceana	"Unexpected"	VOLT dance group
7 November 2014	Tomasz Szymuś's Orchestra	"Nigdy więcej" "¿Dónde estabas tú?" "L'Italiano" "Jožin z bažin"	Anna Głogowska and Rafał Maserak, Stefano Terrazzino, Jan Kliment
7 November 2014	Honorata Skarbek	"Naga" "Nie powiem jak"	VOLT dance group
7 November 2014	Tomasz Szymuś's Orchestra	"Mah Nà Mah Nà"	Agnieszka Popielewicz and Bilguun Ariunbaatar
14 November 2014	Tomasz Szymuś's Orchestra	"The Imperial March" "Only Girl (In the World)" "Born This Way" "Dance Again"	All celebrities and all professional dancers
14 November 2014	Tomasz Szymuś's Orchestra	"Time to Say Goodbye"	All male celebrities with their partners
14 November 2014	Tomasz Szymuś's Orchestra	"U Can't Touch This" "Super Freak"	All female celebrities with their partners excluding finalists
14 November 2014	Tomasz Szymuś's Orchestra	"Independent Women" "The Best" "Rumour Has It" "What You Get Is What You See"	Formacja EFEKT
14 November 2014	Sylwia Grzeszczak & Sound'n'Grace	"My Heart Will Go On"	—

== Rating figures ==
Date	Episode	Official rating 4+	Share 4+	Official rating 16–49	Share 16–49
5 September 2014	1	3 319 486	23.36%	1 071 386	19.20%
12 September 2014	2	3 184 963	21.81%	1 031 835	18.09%
19 September 2014	3	3 238 614	21.88%	—N/a	—N/a
26 September 2014	4	3 531 712	23.50%	1 046 240	17.81%
3 October 2014	5	3 836 941	25.19%	1 236 122	20.28%
10 October 2014	6	3 638 255	24.34%	—N/a	—N/a
17 October 2014	7	3 756 147	24.03%	1 149 256	18.51%
24 October 2014	8	3 580 026	22.83%	—N/a	—N/a
31 October 2014	9	3 687 710	24.30%	—N/a	—N/a
7 November 2014	10	3 980 107	25.12%	1 134 004	18.32%
14 November 2014	11	4 533 381	27.80%	1 341 031	20.55%
Average	Fall 2014	3 662 488	24.07%	1 107 276	18.39%
