= Call Me Ace =

American rapper (born 1989)

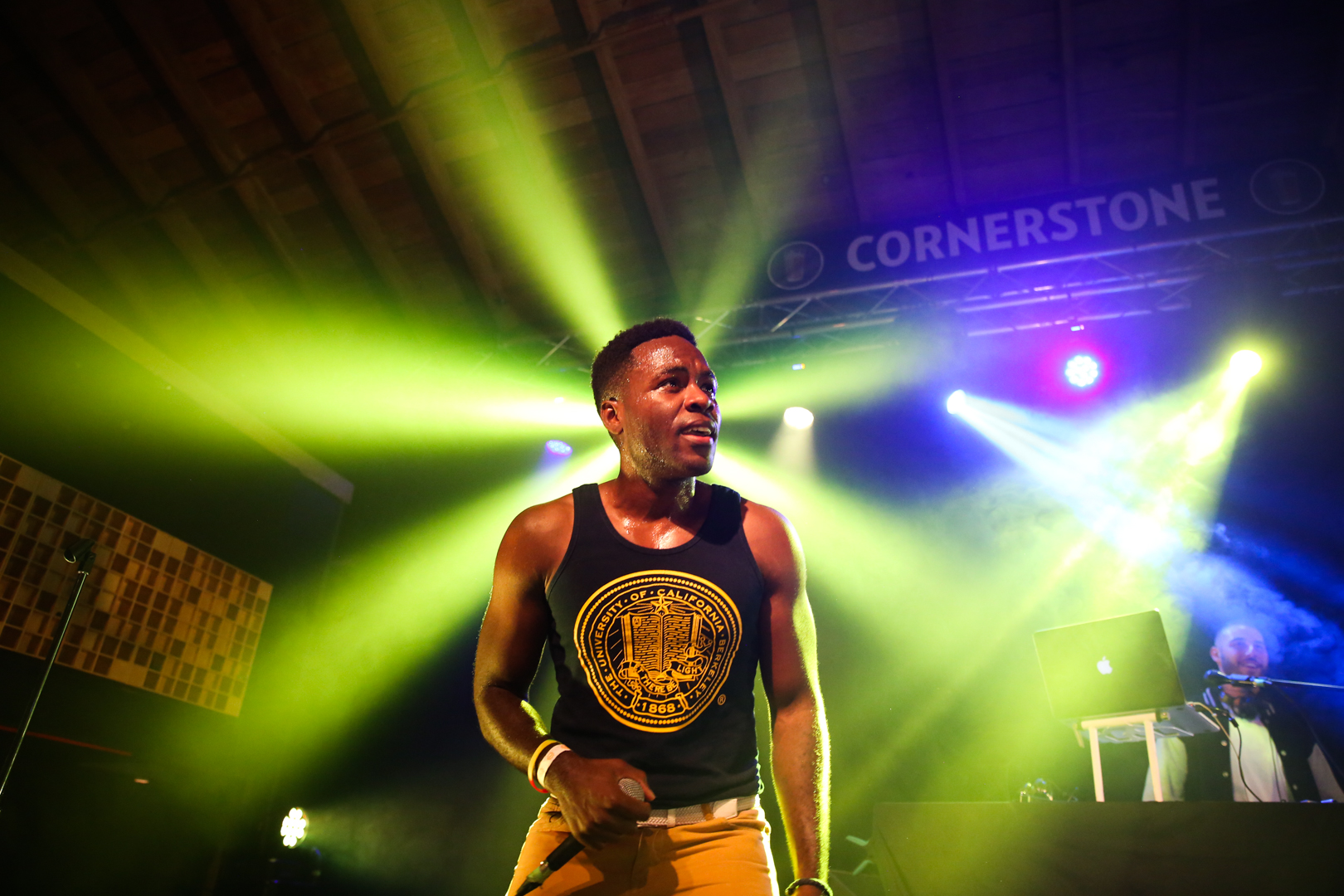
- Call Me Ace at Cornerstone Berkeley, 2018

Background information
- Also known as: Ace, High Grade
- Born: Anthony Patterson; August 15, 1989 (age 37); Bridgeport, Connecticut, U.S.
- Genres: Hip hop
- Occupation: Rapper
- Instrument: Vocals
- Years active: 2016–present
- Label: Light Armor Music
- Website: callmeace.com
- Education: Columbia University; University of California, Berkeley, Haas School of Business; IESE Business School

Anthony "Ace" Patterson (August 15, 1989), also known by his stage name Call Me Ace, is an American rapper from Bridgeport, Connecticut.

== Life ==
Ace Patterson was born in Bridgeport, Connecticut. His parents emigrated from Jamaica before they had him. He went to Greens Farms Academy for high school and middle school.

In 2007, Ace enrolled at Columbia University in New York City. In 2009, he co-founded the student group, Columbia University Society of Hip-Hop (CUSH). In 2011, Ace received a Bachelor of Arts in Anthropology. In 2016, Ace received a Master of Business Administration and joined Deloitte Consulting.

In 2016, Call Me Ace released his first EP, Misinterpretations. In August 2017, Call Me Ace released the 2interpretations mixtape In March 2019 he released his first studio album, Airplane Mode. In February 2020, Call Me Ace released his 2nd EP, Working From Home. In June 2020, he quickly followed up with the EP, Working From Home: Extended.

In February 2021, Call Me Ace released his second studio album, Out Of Office.

== Discography ==
=== Studio albums ===
List of albums, with selected chart positions
Title	Album details	Peak chart positions		
Title	Album details	US	US R&B/HH Sales	US Rap
Airplane Mode	Released: March 22, 2019; Labels: Light Armor Music; Format: Digital download	—	50	—
Out Of Office	Released: February 5, 2021; Labels: Light Armor Music; Format: Digital download	—	—	—
"—" denotes a title that did not chart, or was not released in that territory.

=== Extended plays ===
List of EPs, with selected chart positions
Title	Album details	Peak chart positions		
Title	Album details	US	US R&B/HH Sales	US Rap
Misinterpretations	Released: December 9, 2016; Labels: Light Armor Music; Format: CD, Digital download	—	—	—
Working From Home	Released: February 29, 2020; Labels: Light Armor Music; Format: CD, Digital download	—	—	—
Working From Home: Extended	Released: June 26, 2020; Labels: Light Armor Music; Format: CD, Digital download	—	—	—
"—" denotes a title that did not chart, or was not released in that territory.

=== Mixtapes ===
List of mixtapes
Title	Album details
2interpretations	Released: August 15, 2017; Label: Light Armor Music; Formats: CD, Digital download
Day Job Flow	Released: October 12, 2018; Label: Light Armor Music; Formats: Digital download
