= Pablo Tovar =

Spanish psychologist

- Pablo Tovar Martínez
- Born: 1968 (age 57–58); Murcia
- Education: Universidad Autónoma de Barcelona (UAB)
- Occupations: Pscychologist, Executive Coach

Pablo Tovar (Murcia, 1968) is a Spanish psychologist - senior executive coach, lecturer and author. Specialised in leadership and organisational transformation, he is the author of several books on the subject and consultant on the documentary film Leap! (2020). He was awarded the Estudios Financieros Prize in 1995 and 1996, among other honours.

== Career ==
Graduate in Psychology (Universidad Autónoma de Barcelona - UAB) and Master in Human Resources Management (Centro de Estudios Financieros), he has taken several postgraduate courses in business management at ESADE (PDD 01), IESE (PDD 04), University of San Jose in California with Professor Federico Varona (1997); and at Harvard University (2010) with Professors Robert Kegan and Lisa Lahey.

His career as a lecturer began at the UAB, where he taught Research Methods and Statistics (1994–1996). He has been academic collaborator at several universities and business schools (ESADE, EADA, Universidad Francisco de Vitoria, Universidad de Santiago de Compostela), and at the Master's in Coaching and NLP (Institut Gestalt).

His career in human resources began in 1991 and led him to some management and executive responsibilities in organisations and companies such as CEINSA, Boehringer Ingelheim España, Seminis (now Bayer) and Layetana Inmobiliaria.

In 2008 he began to work as an independent professional advising on leadership development and major transformations for multinational companies in banking, laboratories, telecommunications, consulting, distribution and infrastructure. He is co–founder and CEO of AddVenture and senior fellow of Oxford Leadership. As a speaker he has been invited to participate in national and international conferences.

As a human resources expert he is the author of several books and academic articles and co-author of several research papers on the subject. As an Action Inquiry Fellow he is a recognised expert in the theory of Adult Development applied to leadership, being a disciple of Professor William R. Torbert. He has participated as an expert coach in the documentary film Leap! (2020) which aims to discover whether coaching can help ordinary people achieve extraordinary things. The film has been nominated in 11 film festivals and has won 6 awards.

== Awards ==
- Expocoaching 2017 Award for the best blog on coaching and leadership.
- First Prize "Estudios Financieros" (1996) Category: Human Resources.
- Second Prize "Estudios Financieros" (1995) Category: Human Resources.

== Publications ==
=== Books and book chapters ===
- Tovar, P.: Coaching para líderes cotidianos (2017), Pub. Letras de autor. ISBN 978-84-16958-03-0
- Tovar, P. ¿Cuánto quieres cobrar? (2016). Pub. Letras de autor. ISBN 978-84-16958-01-6
- Osorio, M. et Tovar, P. (1999) Manual de práctica retributiva (2 vols). Pub. CISS. ISBN 978-84-8235-246-6
- Tovar, P. Prólogo en Simó, E. et Simó, G. (2017) 8 Estrategias de Mindfulness para Potenciar tu Auto-liderazgo: Un viaje hacia la Maestría Personal. Pub. Autografía. ISBN 978-84-17169-30-5
- Tovar, P. “Coaching Co-activo” en Olivé, V. (2010) Pnl & Coaching: una visión integradora. Pub. Rigden. ISBN 978-84-937808-6-9

=== Papers ===
- Tovar, P. ”La alquimia de la transformación del liderazgo” Observatorio de recursos humanos y relaciones laborales, ISSN 1886-4244, Nº. 124, 2017, pages 56-59
- Prat, R. et Tovar, P. “Modelo de compensación total. La motivación más allá de la retribución” Capital humano: revista para la integración y desarrollo de los recursos humanos, ISSN 1130-8117, nº 12, Nº 118, 1999, pages 24-40
- Plans, P.N., Prat, R. et Tovar, P. “Retribución de directivos. Más allá del atraer, motivar y retener”. Capital humano: revista para la integración y desarrollo de los recursos humanos, ISSN 1130-8117, nº 13, Nº 129, 2000, pages 22-27
- Osorio, M. et Tovar, P. “Gain sharing: Cómo reforzar el compromiso y estimular el rendimiento de sus empleados” Estudios financieros. Revista de trabajo y seguridad social: Comentarios, casos prácticos : recursos humanos, ISSN 1138-9532, Nº. 200, 1999, pages 101-142
- Osorio, M. et Tovar, P. “Gain Sharing: cómo generar y estimular la participación y el compromiso de los empleados mediante la política retributiva” Capital humano: revista para la integración y desarrollo de los recursos humanos, ISSN 1130-8117, nº 10, Nº 98, 1997, pages 45-50
- Osorio, M. et Tovar, P.“¿Cuántas Employee Value Proposition tiene en su compañía? Equipos & Talentos: gestión, selección y formación en RR HH, Nº. 55, 2009, page. 12
- Xart, J.C. et Tovar, P. “Gestión de la comunicación interna: Una experiencia hospitalaria”, Capital humano: revista para la integración y desarrollo de los recursos humanos, ISSN 1130-8117, nº 9, Nº 95, 1996, pages 42-48
