= Carla Herrero =

Spanish writer, lecturer and activist

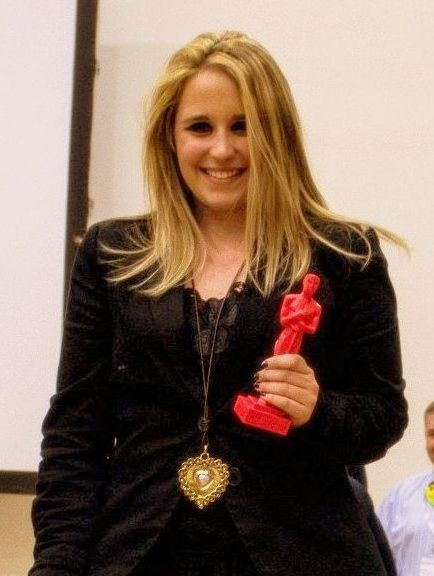
- Herrero in 2014
- Born: December 1994 (age 31); Girona, Catalonia, Spain
- Other names: Silay Alkma
- Known for: Anti-bullying activism
- Notable work: "El dolor silencioso"

Carla Herrero Torellas (born December 1994), also known by the pseudonym Silay Alkma, is a Spanish writer, lecturer, and activist against school bullying. As of 2019, she works for the leadership consultancy WALK, an Oxford Leadership member.

For eight years in her youth, Herrero was bullied on account of her weight and felt depressed, useless, and without identity. She has said that she realized she had been bullied when she entered a new, positive school environment. There, she did a research project about youth identity and bullying that was awarded by the University of Girona, where she studied psychology for a year. An accompanying video titled "El dolor silencioso" (The Silent Pain) featured bullied youth including herself encouraging others to speak up. Her organization Rompe el Silencio (Break the Silence), formed in 2013, supported bullied youth in online and face-to-face settings.

== Early life and education ==
Herrero's classmates started bullying her when she was eight years old. A third-grade student at a primary school in Tordera, Barcelona, Herrero was a little bit heavier than her peers and somewhat introverted. Classmates would use nicknames and insults to isolate and make fun of her on account of her weight. Amid the bullying, which she did not explicitly perceive while it was happening, she turned further inward, becoming silent and averse to eye contact. She recalled feeling alone as she saw other children playing during recess. Eating was a temporary relief, though as she gained weight she was subjected to more insults. Her home and supportive family were a refuge from harassment.

At the age of 11, Herrero joined a social group in which one student led the others in continuing to judge and bully her. The girls in the group, she later reflected, made her feel inferior and thus easier to manipulate. They were also physically hurtful: One time, they pushed her down stairs, and another time, they pulled a chair out from under her. Herrero had suicidal thoughts and began to self-harm; she said she felt anguished, depressed, confused, victimized, and useless. She said she did not know who she was—during a developmental stage at which a child is supposed to form her identity. Looking in a mirror, feeling her skin, and hearing her voice all made her feel bad, she said. Breaking her own silence, she later said—letting someone know—would have been the best thing to do. She said she slowly came to realize that she liked talking to people outside her punishing social group.

The bullying lasted eight years, ending when she started bachillerato and, she said, adopted a healthier mindset. Herrero said she liked this new environment, where she got good grades and realized that her social group had not been a true friendship. Online, under the pseudonym Silay Alkma, she blogged about her bullying experience and met other young bullying victims from around the world. Her diary was put together in a book, titled Alma de Cristal (Soul of Glass). Her bullying also inspired a bachillerato research project about youth identity amid bullying that she undertook at IES Lluís Companys in Tordera. The work argues that the identity of bullied people is suppressed, that they stay this way for fear of being totally outcast, and that an environment supportive of resilience and self-expression is needed for them to overcome bullying. To accompany the research project, Herrero made a video titled "El dolor silencioso" (The Silent Pain) featuring some of the people she met online and herself, describing their bullying and encouraging other young suffering people to speak up. The video received wide attention on the internet. Herrero's family learned about her bullying only when the research and video came out.

In 2012, her work won a Consell Social prize for research in youth issues from the University of Girona. The award covered one year of studying psychology at the University of Girona starting in September 2012. Later that year, at the university, she gave a TEDxYouth talk about her experience being bullied and finding others online.

== Career ==
In 2013, with backing from the Fundación Telefónica program Think Big Jóvenes, Herrero formed an organization called Rompe el Silencio (Break the Silence) to support youth who have suffered bullying, abuse, and psychological disorders. Its purpose was to help those people get access to treatment and regain their identity. With the organization, Herrero gave lectures and workshops at schools to raise awareness about youth harassment. The organization's website provided a platform for youth to communicate. The Think Big program helped develop her organization and expand its reach, and it ran programs in countries such as Peru, Ecuador, Argentina, and Mexico. In 2015, Rompe el Silencio was among ten winners in Spain's Making More Health contest sponsored by the nonprofit network Ashoka and the pharmaceutical firm Boehringer Ingelheim, receiving €400 along with professional training in Barcelona. The next year, Herrero was one of two finalists from Spain to attend an international Making More Health conference at Boehringer Ingelheim's headquarters in Germany.

According to the leadership consultancy WALK (a member of Oxford Leadership), where Herrero works as an office and program manager, she received a psychology degree from the National University of Distance Education, previously volunteered for the United Nations as a research data analyst, and worked with Youth Europa and the European Youth Parliament.

== Published works ==
- "A la recerca de la pròpia identitat" (2012; Catalan, In search of one's own identity)
- Alma de Cristal (2012; Spanish, Soul of Glass)
