= Mary Ngechu =

Kenyan social entrepreneur and industrialist

- Born: Mary Wanjugu; Kenya
- Education: Jomo Kenyatta University of Agriculture and Technology
- Occupations: Entrepreneur; Industrialist
- Known for: Environmental activism
- Title: Founder at: TakaTaka Ni Mali Foundation
- Spouse: Paul Ngechu
- Children: 3

Mary Wanjugu Ngechu is a Kenyan social entrepreneur, environmental enthusiast, and industrialist. She is the managing director of Line Plast Group, a manufacturing company based in Nairobi, and the founder and patron of the TakaTaka Ni Mali Foundation, a non-profit organization focused on leveraging technology, innovation, and community-driven solutions to advance waste management and circular economy initiatives. In 2024, she was awarded the Moran of the Order of the Burning Spear (MBS) by President of Kenya William Ruto.

== Education ==
Mary studied telecommunications engineering at the Kenya College of Communication Technology from 1994 to 1996. She later obtained a qualification in information technology from Jomo Kenyatta University of Agriculture and Technology between 2004 and 2006. She undertook executive training at Strathmore Business School between 2015 and 2016. In 2019, she completed an online course in entrepreneurship offered by Harvard University through edX and an executive Bachelor of Business Administration from European Business University of Luxembourg in 2024.

== Career ==
Mary is the Group Managing Director at Line Plast Group Ltd, overseeing three subsidiaries: Line Art Solutions Limited, a labels printing company she co-founded in 2006; Plast Packaging, a manufacturer of recyclable and environmentally friendly PET, PP, and PE containers and closures; and Aromakare Ltd, a manufacturer which focuses in turnkey services for beauty brands, professional, and retail products. In 2017, Mary was featured in an International Labour Organization article about her approaches to skills development and workforce inclusion.

Mary was involved in launching the Africa Waste is Wealth Series, a regional waste management conference organized through the TakaTaka Ni Mali Foundation and partners. It brings together policymakers, industry stakeholders, and environmental actors to discuss on waste management in East Africa.

Mary is a Director at Kenya Private Sector Alliance (KEPSA) in charge of SME and startups since 2022 and she is a Goodwill Ambassador of the East African Business Council Championing SMES and Climate since 2019. She is also a member of the board of directors of the Kenya Packaging Producer Responsibility Organisation. In 2024, she was appointed to the advisory board of the International Solid Waste Association. She chaired the Women in Manufacturing initiative under the Kenya Association of Manufacturers until September 2024.

== TTNM Foundation ==
Mary founded the TakaTaka Ni Mali Foundation in 2017 after being recognized as runner-up for the UN in Kenya person of the year, to build a transformative ecosystem that empowers communities and advances sustainability through advocacy, education, innovation, and partnerships, connecting all aspects of waste management to drive a circular economy in Kenya. TakaTaka Ni Mali means Waste is Wealth.

In 2022, the organization launched Ecomali, a digital platform to track waste movement, its conversion and environmental impact. In 2023, TTNM launched Ecoloop, an ESG Data Management and Reporting platform that allows companies to Unlock Brand value across the value chain.

== Recognition ==
- 2017: United Nations in Kenya Person of the Year, runner-up.
- 2018: EY East Africa Entrepreneur of the Year, Winning Woman finalist.
- 2019: Zuri Awards, Woman in Manufacturing.
- 2024: Moran of the Order of the Burning Spear (MBS).
