= Sheila Mwarangu =

Kenya Consultant civil and structural engineer

- Born: 1979 (age 46–47); Kenya
- Citizenship: Kenyan
- Occupation: Consultant Civil Engineer
- Title: Managing Partner at Gathara & Partners Consulting Civil and Structural Engineers
- Website: Homepage

Sheila Wairimu Mwarangu (née Sheila Wairimu), is a consultant civil and structural engineer, who is a partner and managing director at Gathara & Partners Consulting Civil and Structural Engineers, a Kenyan consulting engineering company in Nairobi, Kenya's capital and largest city.

== Education ==
She obtained her Bachelor of Engineering (BEng) in Civil Engineering in 2002, from the University of Manchester. She continued her studies at Imperial College London, where she was awarded a Master of Science (MSc) degree in Structural Engineering, in 2003. She also has an Executive MBA (EMBA) degree from IESE Business School, awarded in 2015. Later, in 2016, she obtained a Master of Business Administration (MBA) degree from Strathmore Business School.

== Career ==
Immediately after her master's degree at Imperial College, she was hired by the Halcrow Group, working there as a graduate engineer, at their offices in Manchester, in the United Kingdom, for two years from 2003 until 2005. In 2006, she switched employers and relocated to TRP Consulting, also in Manchester, working there as a structural engineer for two years until 2008. She then moved to her native Kenya and worked as an engineer at Gathara and Partners Consulting Engineers for one year until 2010.

She then returned to Manchester, United Kingdom, and worked as a structural engineer at Clancy Consulting, for two years until 2012. In October 2012 she was elected partner at Gathara & Partners Consulting Engineers, in Nairobi Kenya. In August 2017, she was appointed as managing director and chief executive officer at the engineering consultancy.

She sits in a number of boards of directors, including at ASHA Freight Limited, a freight forwarding business based in Manchester, United Kingdom and at CONTERRA Limited, a Nairobi-based real estate development company.

== Personal life ==
She is a mother of two children.

== Awards and honours ==
In 2017, Sheila Mwarangu was named among the "Top 40 Under 40 Women 2017" by Business Daily Africa, a daily English language business newspaper, published by the Nation Media Group

== See also ==
- Esther Koimett
- Catherine Igathe
- Carole Kariuki
- Naadiya Moosajee
