= Strathmore Business School =

Business school in Nairobi, Kenya

Strathmore University Business School (SBS)
- Type: Private
- Established: 2005
- Affiliations: Strathmore University
- Dean: George Njenga
- Academic staff: Full time: 75
- Administrative staff: 160
- Students: 4500
- Location: Nairobi, Kenya; 1°18′36″S 36°48′48″E
- Campus: Urban
- Website: SBS.edu

Strathmore University Business School (SBS) is the business school of Strathmore University. Based in Nairobi, Kenya, it offers Doctoral, Masters and Undergraduate programmes, as well as executive education programmes. It was started in 2005 through a partnership between Strathmore University and IESE Business School. As part of Strathmore University, it is a private non-profit institution and a corporate work of Opus Dei, a Personal Prelature of the Catholic Church. It was the first green business school in Africa.

== History ==
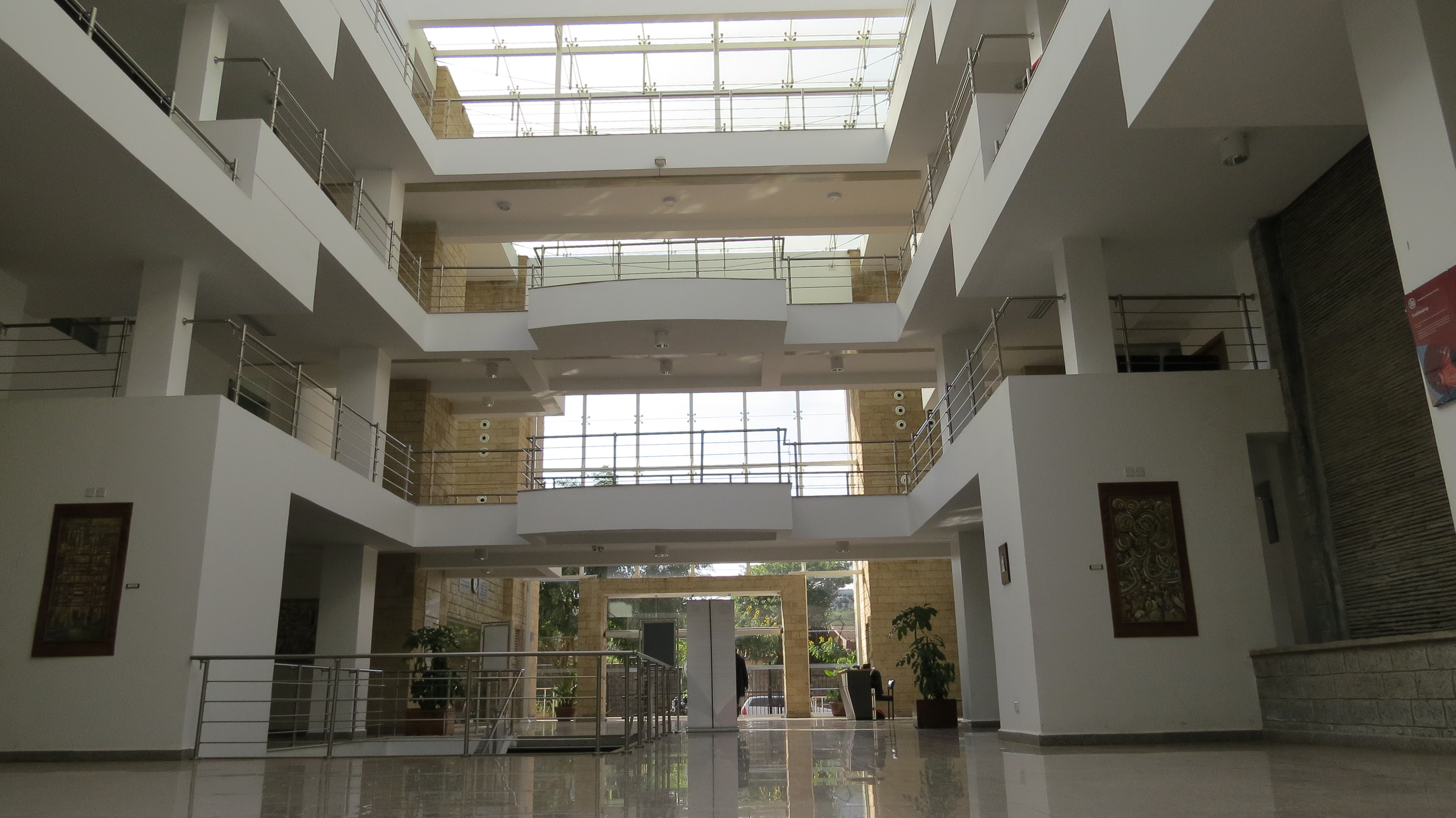
Strathmore Business School Campus, Madaraka

In 2005, Strathmore University entered into a partnership with IESE Business School, creating Strathmore University Business School.

The new business school started its first program on 11 January 2006 with Dr George Njenga as the dean, offering the Advanced Management Program. Its MBA for Executives program was launched in 2007.

It operated from office space in the university's library, conducting classes in the conference facilities of hotels in Nairobi.

In 2009, construction began at the site of a new campus, at which it started operating in 2012. The building was designed to have a very low carbon footprint, receiving an award, in 2012, for being the Best Green Building Development in Africa.

== Rankings ==
- 2014
  - 1st in Kenya – Eduniversal
  - 1st in Kenya – Webometrics
  - 8th in Africa – Webometrics
- 2013
  - 2nd in Kenya – Eduniversal
- 2011
  - 3rd in Africa – African Business Review

== Memberships and Accreditation ==
Strathmore Business School is a member of:

- Association of African Business Schools (AABS)
- Association to Advance Collegiate Schools of Business (AACSB)
- European Foundation for Management Development (EFMD)
- Global Business School Network (GBSN)
- African Academic Association on Entrepreneurship (AAAE)

== Notable alumni ==
- Iddah Asin, lawyer and Johnson & Johnson executive
- Sheila Mwarangu, civil and structural engineer
- Mary Ngechu, Industrialist
