= Francisco García Paramés =

Spanish fund manager (born 1963)

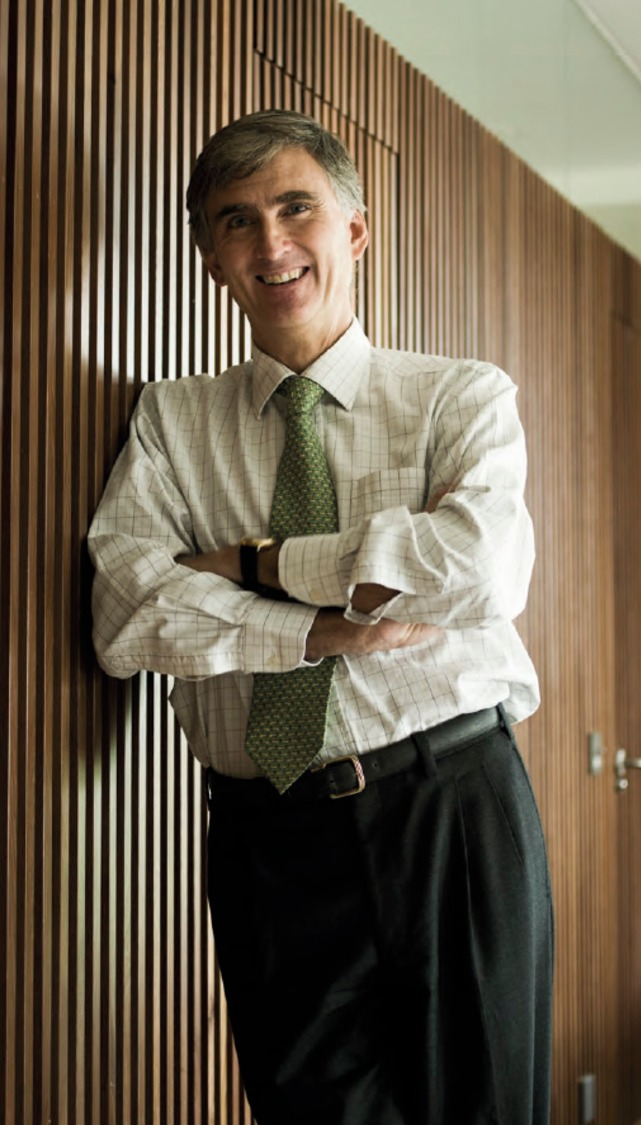
- Born: 22 December 1963 (age 62); Galicia, Spain

Francisco García Paramés (born in Galicia (Spain), 22 December 1963) is a Spanish fund manager. In 1989, he established Bestinver Asset Management. Bestinver is a subsidiary of Acciona.

His management style is based on the strict application of the principles of the school of Value Investing (Benjamin Graham, Warren Buffett, Peter Lynch), under the Austrian Business Cycle Theory.

He graduated in economics from the Complutense University of Madrid and holds an MBA from IESE Business School (University of Navarra).

On 7 March 2006, he survived a severe plane accident with two other executives from the same company. The pilot and the chief financial officer of Bestinver perished in the same accident.

On 23 September 2014, he resigned from Bestinver due to differences with Acciona, owner of the Asset Management firm.

On 7 May 2016, he was awarded an honorary doctorate in business by Francisco Marroquín University of Guatemala.

On 11 May 2016, his return to the investment funds management was publicly announced in September of the same year. On 26 September 2016, it was revealed that he would start his own Asset Management firm. At the end of that same year, he started his own fund management firm, Cobas Asset Management SGIIC.

== Biography ==
In 1989, after finishing his MBA at the IESE, he joined Bestinver Asset Management where, after 2 years as a Spanish assets analyst, he started managing portfolios and funds.

His career path as an investment manager could be summarized in the light of the profit obtained by his Spanish equity funds, that during the period 1993–2007 tripled the one obtained by the reference index (IGBM). In 1997, he also began managing international equities, situating himself in leading positions in the foreign fund market traded in Spain, with an accumulated profitability from 1998 to 2007 that multiplied by seven the one obtained by the reference index (MSCI World Index). Thanks to his profitability, Paramés has managed to make Bestinver the value investing European benchmark, together with Jean-Marie Eveillard from First Eagle.

Paramés is known in the financial world for his faith in his investment philosophy, thanks to which he avoided investing in technological values in 2000 or in companies of the banking sector and real estate in 2007. Although he is not keen on appearing in the press, he brings together his investors every year in a conference (similarly to the one offered by Warren Buffett in Omaha) in which together with the other two managers of Bestinver funds, Álvaro Guzmán de Lázaro and Fernando Bernad Marrase, explains his investment management vision.

In September 2014 Francisco García Paramés announced his departure from Bestinver due to differences with the Entrecanales family, reference stockholders of Acciona and owners of Bestinver. After his decision of leaving the company, Fernando Bernad and Beltrán Parages started in October 2015 the asset management firm AzValor, to which soon after Álvaro Guzmán joined. Francisco García Paramés could not join due to a two-year non-competition agreement on his contract with Bestinver.

However, once the period of non-competition passed in September 2016, Paramés announced by surprise that he would not join AzValor, his old Bestinver colleagues’ firm. Instead, Francisco García Paramés decided to start a new investment management firm, Cobas Asset Management.
