= Franz Heukamp =

Dean of Iese Business School

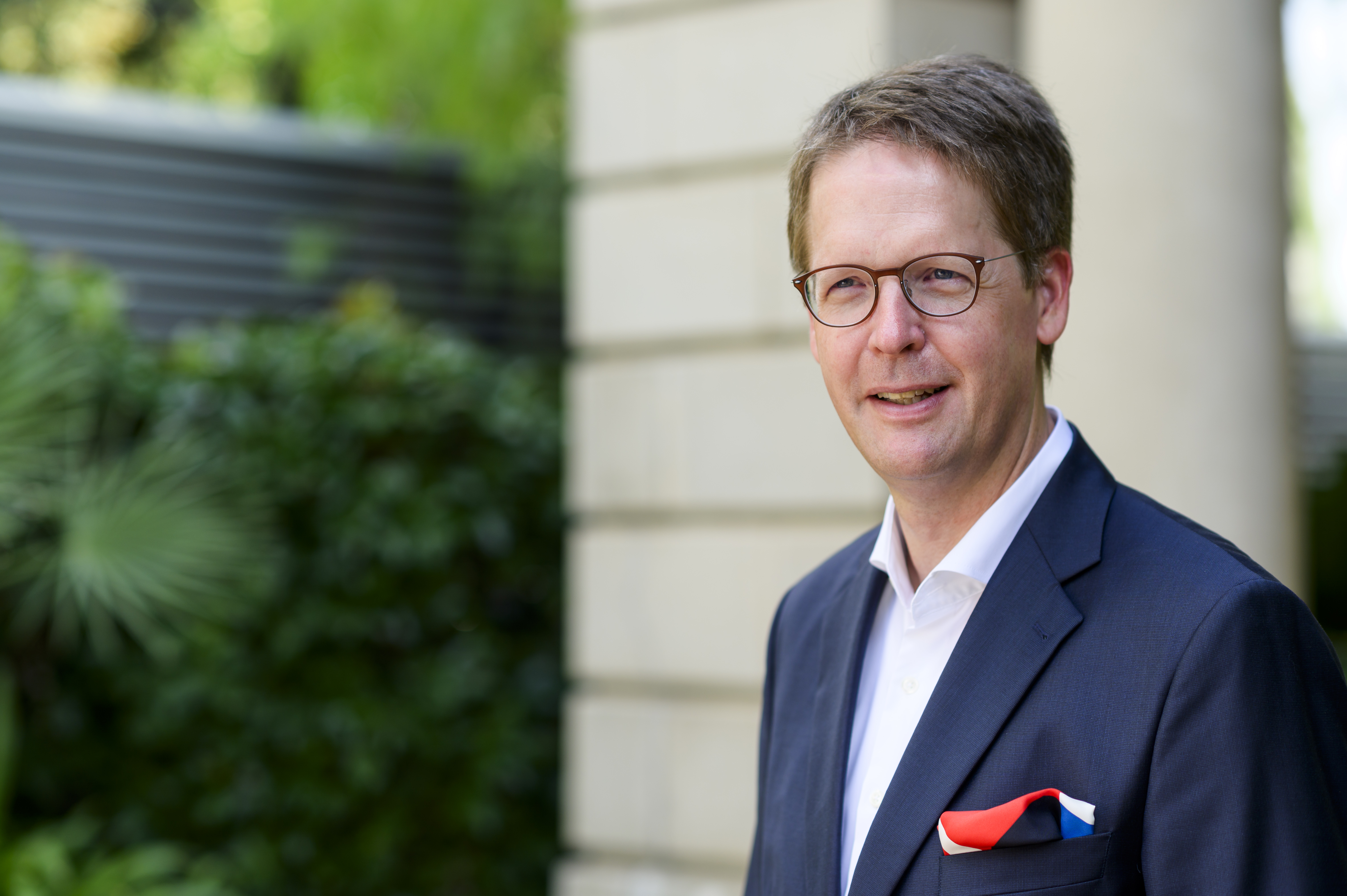
- Born: September 6, 1973 (age 52); Germany
- Occupations: Engineer, professor, author

Franz Heukamp (born September 6, 1973, Germany) is the dean of IESE Business School and has held this post since 2016. He is also business management scholar and Professor of Managerial Decision Sciences at IESE Business School, University of Navarra.

== Biography ==
Heukamp has been a member of IESE faculty since 2002. In 2016, he was appointed dean by the president of the University. He holds a PhD from the Massachusetts Institute of Technology (1999–2002), a degree in Civil Engineering from the École Nationale des Ponts et Chaussées – ParisTech and a degree in engineering from the Technical University of Munich.

Heukamp is a scholar of behavioral decision-making with a special interest in the area of neuroeconomics. He conducts research into neuroeconomics in conjunction with neuroscientists from the University of Navarra's School of Medicine and Hospital.

He is a member of The Institute for Operations Research and the Management Sciences (INFORMS) and the Society For Neuroeconomics. Heukamp is also member of the IESE International Advisory Board and the IESE Supervisory Board. He is on the Advisory Board of the Technical University of Munich (TUM).

Heukamp's teaching specialties are decision analysis and forecasting methods. He teaches in the MBA, Global Executive MBA and other executive education programs at IESE, including the Advanced Management Program which is aimed at international business leaders.

== Publications ==
His articles have appeared in journals including Management Science, Social Indicators Research, Theory and Decision, Organizational Behavior and Human Decision Processes, and The Journal of Private Equity.

Professor Heukamp has also authored business cases for university teaching and technical notes, among these "Erbitux: A Miracle Drug?" with Miguel A. Ariño, "NILOP Productions" also with Miguel A. Ariño, "Rattunde & Co GmbH" with Cedric Guinaud and others. Technical notes include "Introduction to Monte Carlo Simulation" and "The Value of the Information," both with A. Lewis; "Neuroeconomics," "Option Properties" and "Derivative Markets (2005); and with M. Baucells and Cristina Rata, "Decision Making Under Uncertainty: Risk Preferences and the Role of Intuition".

== Academic management ==
Heukamp was Secretary General of IESE Business School between 2009 and 2012. Between 2012 and 2016 he was the Associate Dean for the school's MBA Programs.

During his tenure, the IESE full-time MBA has seen a growth in international intake with 85% of its students now coming from outside of Spain and from 60 countries. He has been highly active in expanding the program's academic alliances and exchanges and has spearheaded the addition of overseas modules at IESE campuses and centers in New York, São Paulo, Shanghai and Nairobi. Within its network of alliances, the IESE MBA delivers more than 30 exchange programs with top worldwide MBA programs.

In 2018, IESE launched a 52 million Euro expansion project of its Madrid facilities, to be completed in late 2020. During his time as dean, IESE has launched different multidisciplinary projects: the Artificial Intelligence and the Future of Management Initiative (2020), the School of Founders (2022), and the Institute for Sustainability Leadership (2023). Several academic programmes and new training formats were also introduced: the Master in Management (Madrid Campus, 2019); Executive MBA (Munich Campus, 2019); the Master in Finance (Madrid Campus); new Executive Education programs (the General Management Program and the Flexible PDD with online and on-campus modules). In 2023, the IESE Supervisory Board was also created.
