= Agnieszka Sienkiewicz =

Polish actress (born 1984)

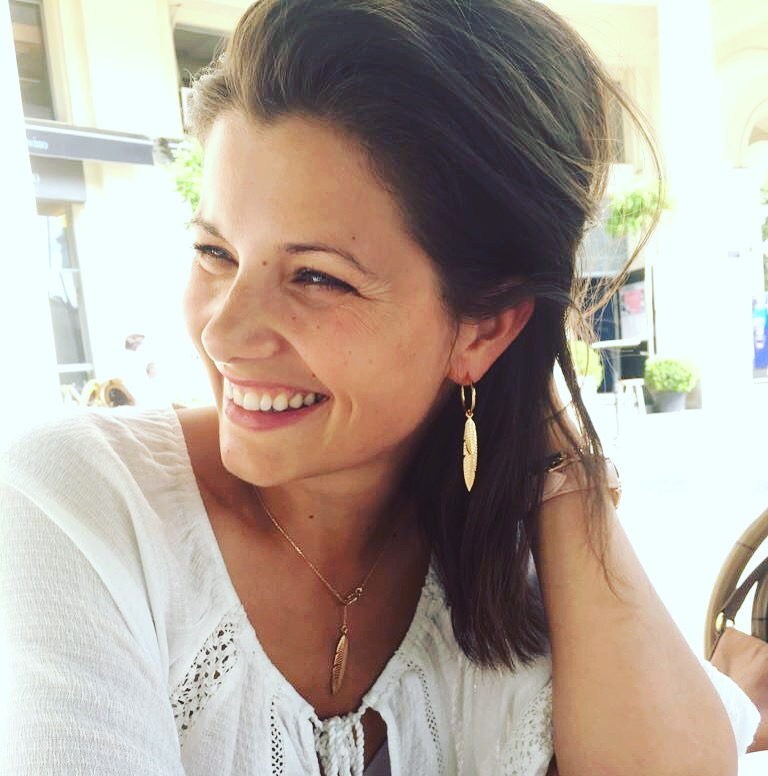
- Born: 19 July 1984 (age 41); Mrągowo, Poland
- Occupation: Actress
- Spouse: Mikołaj Gauer (m. 2017)
- Children: 2
- Relatives: Maciej Marczewski (actor, cousin)

Agnieszka Sienkiewicz-Gauer (born 19 July 1984) is a Polish actress.

== Early life ==
Sienkiewicz was born in Mrągowo on 19 July 1984. She graduated from the Post-Secondary Theatre School at the Stefan Jaracz Theatre in Olsztyn in 2005. She is associated with the Kwadrat Theatre in Warsaw. She also collaborates with the Theatre in Kalisz.

== Career ==
Sienkiewicz made her debut on the small screen in 2007, playing minor roles in the series Klan, Plebania and Twarzą w twarz. She portrayed Magda Jaroszek, one of the lead characters in the series Agentki (2008), and portrayed the role of Wiki in the series Prosto w serce (2010–2011) and Katarzyna Mularczyk in M jak miłość (2011-2015). From 2012 to 2021, she portrayed Dorota Grabowska in Przyjaciółki. In 2014, together with Stefano Terrazzino, she won the fifteenth season of the light entertainment reality television series Dancing with the Stars: Taniec z gwiazdami.

== Personal life ==
Sienkiewicz a cousin of actor Maciej Marczewski. On 27 May 2017, she married Mikołaj Gauer. They have two daughters, Zofia (born 2016) and Maria (born 2019). She runs a store with children's and family goods at Piotrkowska Street in Łódź.
