= Marek Kamiński =

Polish explorer and businessman

Marek Zdzisław Kamiński
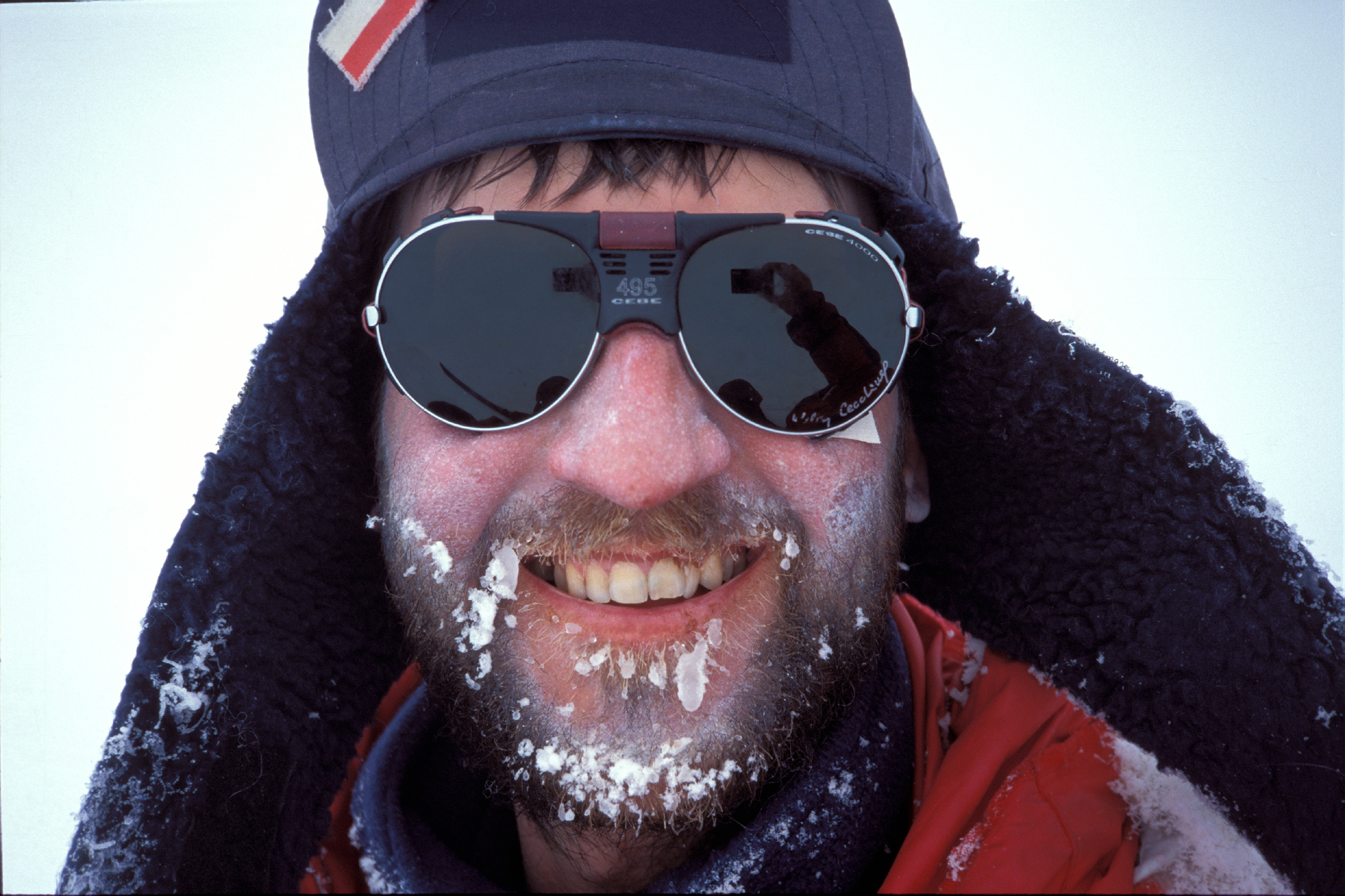
- Born: 24 March 1964 (age 62); Gdańsk, Poland
- Education: University of Warsaw (Master of Philosophy, Master of Physics University of Navarra, IESE Business School, Barcelona (Advanced Management graduate program)
- Occupations: Extreme & polar explorer, author, philosopher, innovator
- Known for: First person to walk both the North Pole (with Wojciech Moskal) and the South Pole (solo) in one year
- Notable work: "The Journey" ("Wyprawa"); "My Poles" ("Moje bieguny"); "Walk Your Own Path" ("Idź własną drogą")
- Spouse: Katarzyna
- Children: 2 (Pola and Kay)
- Awards: Digital Shapers – Visionary
- Honours: The Order of Polonia Restituta, The Ecco Homo Order, The Order of 100 years of Independence
- Website: marekkaminski.com

Marek Kamiński (born 24 March 1964 in Gdańsk) is a Polish innovator, philosopher and an explorer. He is the first person to have reached both the North and the South Pole in one year without outside assistance (the North Pole on 23 May 1995; the South Pole on 27 December 1995).

== Biography ==
Kaminski obtained his Philosophy and Physics degrees at the University of Warsaw and completed the advanced management graduate program at the IESE Business School in Barcelona. He also studied Philosophy in Hamburg.

He led the first-ever expedition to the North Pole and the South Pole with a person with a disability (Jan Mela, who was 15 at the time). He has also crossed the Gibson Desert in Australia – a journey of 800 km (500 mi) in 46 days.

During his "Third Pole" expedition along St. James’ trail, he travelled 4,000 km (2,500 mi) in 140 days from the tomb of Immanuel Kant in Kaliningrad, Russia, to the grave of Saint James in Santiago de Compostela, Spain.

He has travelled 30,000 km (19,000 mi) by electric car from Poland to Japan through Siberia and the Gobi Desert. He was the first person to drive on the Trans-Siberian Highway in an emission-free vehicle. Kamiński is the founder of the ‘Power 4Change’ motivational method and the founder of the Marek Kamiński Foundation. The Marek Kamiński Institute and Invena.

=== Lectures ===
Kamiński has applied his experience in motivation to achieve seemingly impossible goals, as well as work-related to robots and artificial intelligence to give lectures at prestigious universities and conferences around the world.

=== Publications ===
Kamiński has authored 13 books covering his global treks and inward journeys. Some of these books have been translated in as much as 10 languages, winning numerous awards and becoming bestsellers.

=== The Power4Change method ===
An original motivational. It consists of 10 components, such as visualization, the path being more important than the end goal and getting to know oneself.

The method was created based on Kamiński's experience in achieving difficult goals. The Power4Change method is delivered through workshops, training sessions and conferences for companies and individuals and through the "Power4Change" application, available in Poland and worldwide.

== Personal life ==
He was brought up in Połczyn-Zdrój (Pomerania). In 1982 he graduated from Władysław Broniewski high school in Koszalin. He studied Philosophy and Physics at Warsaw University and an Advanced Management Program at IESE Business School. He is the founder and co-owner of a company called Invena S.A. and founder of the Marek Kamiński Foundation.

He lives in Gdynia with his wife, daughter, and son.

== See also ==
- List of Poles
