= Núria Mas =

Spanish economist and professor (born 1973)

- Núria Mas Canal
- Citizenship: Spanish
- Education: Harvard University, PhD
- Alma mater: Pompeu Fabra University
- Employer: IESE Business School

Núria Mas (Berga, Barcelona, 3 August 1973) is a Spanish economist, professor and consultant specialising in the healthcare sector. She holds the Jaime Grego Chair in Global Healthcare Management, and is a member of the Board of Governors of IESE Business School. She has been a counselor of Banco de España, and an advisor to the Generalitat de Catalunya on the sustainability and progress of the health system. Her teaching activities focus on macroeconomics, health economics and public management.

== Training and careers ==
Mas studied economics and business administration at Pompeu Fabra University. She holds a PhD in Economics from Harvard University and Masters degrees in Economics from Pompeu Fabra University and Harvard University.

From 2001 to 2003 she worked at Lehman Brothers in London as an associate in the Fixed Income Department. She has been a lecturer in the Economics Department at IESE Business School since 2003 and was appointed director in 2016. She also holds the Jaime Grego Chair in Global Healthcare Management and is the academic director of the IESE Healthcare Sector Meeting.

Prior to joining IESE and during her doctoral studies, Mas was a researcher at the National Bureau of Economic Research in Boston. Between 2014 and 2015 she was a member of the Advisory Council for the Sustainability and Progress of the Health System of the Generalitat de Catalunya. Núria Mas is an Honorary Member of the Asociación Española de Economía.

=== Councillor of the Banco de España ===
On 24 March 2017, she was appointed councillor of the Banco de España, replacing Guillem López Casasnovas. With her appointment, four of the ten members of the Banco de España's board were women. The other three women were Carmen Alonso, the Secretary General of the Treasury, Emma Navarro, and the Vice-President of the CNMV, Ana María Martínez-Pina. In March 2023, Mas completed her six-year term as a director.

=== Other positions ===
Mas has been a member of the Board of Trustees of the Guttmann Foundation since 2021. The Guttmann Foundation is an international benchmark hospital in the field of neurorehabilitation. She is also a member of the Board of Directors of the Cercle d'Economia, a civic association that contributes to public debate on major economic, social and political challenges. She has held the Jaime Grego Chair in Global Healthcare Management since 2014, and is a member of the Board of Governors of IESE Business School since 2021.

== Research ==
Núria Mas has devoted her academic career to health economics research, focusing on the organisation of health systems. She has studied the impact of different health systems on the population and how hospitals and doctors respond to different incentive mechanisms.

=== Scientific publications ===
She has conducted research on public policy evaluation which has been published in several international journals including The Journal of Real Estate Finance and Economics, Journal of Health Economics, The Review of Industrial Organisation, Food Policy, and the International Journal of Healthcare Finance and Economics.

=== Awards and scholarships ===
Núria Mas has received several research awards in Spain, including the ClosingGap Award in 2023 for her contribution to social change towards equal opportunities, innovating and generating economic knowledge on gender equality.

Her research projects have received several grants. In 2009 and 2018, she received a grant from the Spanish Ministry of Education and Science to study the impact of organisational structure and incentives in primary care, and the impact of globalisation on obesity and calorie intake.

In 2017, she received a grant from the Agencia de Gestió d'Ajuts Universitaris to explore the converging narratives of integrated and chronic management and the relationship between health and wealth, exploring how these factors interrelate and influence policies and practices in health and economics. In 2017, she received funding from the Robert Wood Johnson Foundation to study models of accountable health in Spain, chronic care management, and promoting a culture of health. In 2021, she will explore the dual practice of physicians and its impact on labour supply, quality of care and health care costs, with a grant from the Social Trends Institute.

Se has been a member of the jury for the Banco Sabadell Foundation Awards for Economic Research.

=== Featured work ===
- Nuria Mas i Canal; Giovanni Valentini (2015). "Technology complexity and target selection: : the case of US hospital mergers". Industrial and Corporate Change 24 (2): 511-537. ISSN 1464-3650.
- Nuria Mas i Canal; Wendy Wisbaum (2014). "The "Triple Aim" for the future of healthcare". Papeles de economía española (142): 2-6. ISSN 0210-9107.
