= Manel Guillen =

Spanish businessman and lawyer (born 1967)

Manel Guillen I Sola (born 19 May 1967) is a Spanish businessman, lawyer and activist investor.

Manel Guillen received a J.D in Law from the Law School of the University of Barcelona in 1991 and an MBA from the IESE Business School, University of Navarra in 1995. He is an active member of the Illustre Collegi d'Advocats de Barcelona, the Loan Syndication and Trading Association, the Turnaround Management Association and the Cercle d'Economia de Barcelona.

Guillen is the founder of the investment company Mediterranean Capital Management, acting as chief executive officer (CEO) since its creation in 2005. Currently based in Barcelona and Madrid, Spain, he has developed his professional career in various senior management positions as CEO in several companies in Spain, the United States, Brazil, Mexico, Argentina, Iran, Germany, Austria and the United Kingdom.

== Professional career ==
He developed his professional career in the German media corporation Bertelsmann Group, as sales and marketing deputy director in the book company Círculo de Lectores, a reference in the Spanish cultural world. In 1997, he became the managing director of Bertelsmann Online in Spain and Latin America, a joint venture created by Planeta Corporación and Bertelsmann Group, based in New York City, United States, and investment activities in all major Latin American countries. In 1999, he was appointed chief operating officer (COO) of Telefónica B2B Construction for Spain and Latin America in Telefónica, the main Spanish telecommunications provider and one of the largest telecoms companies in the world. He was also the CEO of BravoSolution España, part of the Italian multinational Italcementi Group.

In 2005, he founded the investment company Mediterranean Capital Management as its CEO. Based in Barcelona, the company is an active investor in the distressed debt market in Spain and Latin America, focusing its target investments in the distressed mortgage market and high yield corporate debt. As of April 2022, the firm had €300 million of assets under management.

== Non-business activities ==
Guillen's career is also linked to Spanish basketball. He is a former player and professional basketball referee of Basketball Clubs Association (ACB), the men's professional basketball league in Spain. He has been a referee and executive member of the ACB, as chairman of the referees' committee and the referees' director of the ACB from 2001 to 2004.
