= Iddah Asin =

Kenyan lawyer and corporate executive

- Born: 1983 (age 42–43); Kenya
- Citizenship: Kenya
- Education: Makerere University (Bachelor of Laws); Kenya School of Law (Diploma in Law); Strathmore Business School (Master of Arts in Public Policy and Management); Robert F. Wagner Graduate School of Public Service (Certificate in Global Leadership)
- Occupations: Lawyer and corporate executive
- Years active: 2000–present

Iddah Asin is a Kenyan lawyer and corporate executive. She is the executive director of the newly-created International Council of Beverages Associations Africa (ICBA Africa). ICBA is reported to be the "global voice for the non-alcoholic beverage industry". ICBA Africa collaborates with and complements the work of ICBA Latin America and ICBA Asia Pacific.

Before then, she was the director of Government Affairs and Policy for the pharmaceutical company Johnson & Johnson in the countries of the African Great Lakes. In 2017, she was named among the "Top 40 Women Under 40 in Kenya" by the Nation Media Group.

== Background and education ==
Asin was born in Kenya circa 1983. She attended Kenya schools for her elementary and high school studies. In 2003 she was admitted to Makerere University, in Kampala, Uganda, the largest and oldest public university in the country. In 2007, she graduated with a Bachelor of Laws. She returned to Kenya and obtained a Diploma in Law from the Kenya School of Law, and was admitted to the Kenya Bar in 2008. Later in 2016, she graduated with a Master of Arts in Public Policy and Management, from Strathmore Business School, in Nairobi. She also holds a Certificate in Global Leadership, awarded by the New York University, Robert F. Wagner Graduate School of Public Service.

== Career ==
For a period of nearly two years, from January 2008 until September 2009, Asin worked as a legal assistant in the law firm of Rautta & Company Advocates. In October 2009, she joined JetLink Express Limited (IATA: J0, ICAO: JLX), as the airline's legal counsel, based in Nairobi. She worked there for nearly four and a half years until December 2013. In January 2014, she was hired by Kenya Airways (IATA: KQ, ICAO: KQA), the county's national airline, as the Manager, Government and Industry Affairs. In this role she negotiated bilateral service agreements that enabled KQ to open new routes to South Africa, Zimbabwe and Vietnam.

After three years at KQ, in February 2017, she was hired by the American pharmaceutical conglomerate Johnson & Johnson, as the director of Government Affairs and Policy in the countries of the East African Community and Ethiopia, a total of seven countries. She was based in Nairobi, Kenya. In August 2025, she was appointed as the founding executive director of ICBA Africa. In her new role, she is still based in Nairobi.
