= The Journal of Private Equity =

- Discipline: Finance, investment
- Language: English
- Edited by: F. John Mathis

Publication details
- History: 1997–present
- Publisher: Euromoney Institutional Investor
- Frequency: Quarterly

Standard abbreviations
- ISO 4: J. Priv. Equity

Indexing
- ISSN: 1096-5572
- LCCN: 97659779
- JSTOR: jprivateequity
- OCLC no.: 60627025

Links
- Journal homepage

The Journal of Private Equity is a quarterly peer-reviewed academic journal covering strategies and techniques in private equity and venture capital investing, from seed capital and early state investing to mezzanine investing and later-stage financing. The editor-in-chief is F. John Mathis (Thunderbird School of Global Management).
