= Honorata Skarbek =

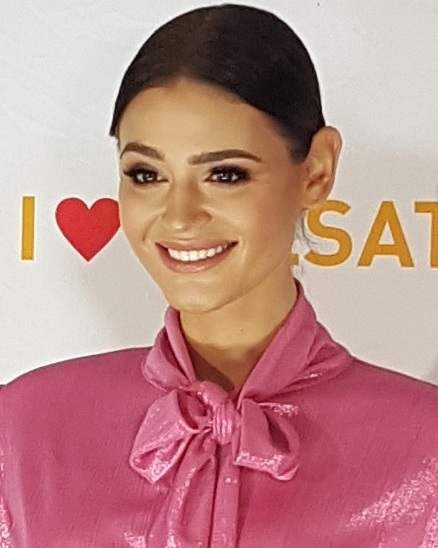

Background information
- Also known as: Honey
- Born: Honorata Skarbek; 23 December 1992 (age 33); Zgorzelec (Poland)
- Genres: Pop
- Instrument: Piano
- Years active: since 2009
- Label: Magic Records
- Website: honorata-skarbek.com

Honorata Skarbek, also known as Honey, (born 23 December 1992) is a Polish professional singer, songwriter and fashion blogger.

Award winner at the festival TOPtrendy 2011 in Sopot and VIVA Comet Awards 2012 in the category debut of the year. Her debut album, "Honey", released on 28 March 2011 was promoted by such hits as "No One", "Runaway", and "Sabotage". In 2013 the singer was nominated for Kids' Choice Award 2013. She was a support act during the first Justin Bieber concert in Poland, which took place on 25 March 2013 at the Atlas Arena in Łódź.

Her second album, "Million", was released on 16 April 2013. First promo single was "Lalalove" (English version is called "Don't Love Me"). The second single from this album is called "Nie powiem jak" (Aeroplane) and is taking premiere on 25 March 2013.

== Discography ==
=== Studio albums ===
Title	Album details	Peak chart positions	Sales	Certifications
Title	Album details	POL	Sales	Certifications
Honey	Released: 21 March 2011; Label: Universal Music Polska, Magic Records; Formats: CD, digital download	—	POL: 15,000+	POL: Gold
Million	Released: 16 April 2013; Label: Universal Music Polska, Magic Records; Formats: CD, digital download	39	POL: 15,000+	POL: Gold
Puzzle	Released: 31 July 2015; Label: Universal Music Polska, Magic Records; Formats: CD, digital download	28		
Sunset	Released: 11 May 2018; Label: Universal Music Polska, Magic Records; Formats: CD, digital download	27		
"—" denotes a recording that did not chart or was not released in that territory.

=== Singles ===
Title	Year	Peak chart positions		Album
Title	Year	POL (JUMPS)	POL (NEW)	Album
"No One"	2011	—	—	Honey
"Runaway"	2011	—	2	Honey
"Sabotaż"	2011	—	1	Honey
"Lalalove (Don't Love Me)"	2013	—	—	Million
"Lalalove (Don't Love Me) (Michael Bear RMX)"	2013	—	—	non-album single
"Insomnia"	2013	—	—	Million
"Nie powiem jak"	2013	1	1	Million
"Fenyloetyloamina"	2013	—	—	Million
"Fenyloetyloamina (FIVER Remix)"	2014	—	—	non-album single
"GPS"	2014	—	—	Puzzle
"Naga"	2014	—	—	Puzzle
"Damy radę"	2015	—	—	Puzzle
"Morze słów"	2015	—	—	Puzzle
"Święta cały rok"	2015	—	—	non-album single
"Na koniec świata"	2017	—	—	Sunset
"Zasady"	2018	—	—	Sunset
"Tylko mój" (ft. Marta Gałuszewska and Ewelina Lisowska)	2018	—	—	(soundtrack)
"Świat jest nasz"	2018	—	—	Sunset
"Chora" (ft. Wdowa)	2018	—	—	Sunset
"Friendzone"	2019	—	—	non-album single
"—" denotes a recording that did not chart or was not released in that territory.

== Tours ==
=== Headlining ===
- The Sabotage Tour (2011–2013)
- My Name Is Million Tour (2013–2014)
- Puzzle Tour (2015–2016)

=== Supporting ===
- Justin Bieber – Believe Tour (2013; Poland)
