= Jan Mela =

Polish explorer (born 1988)

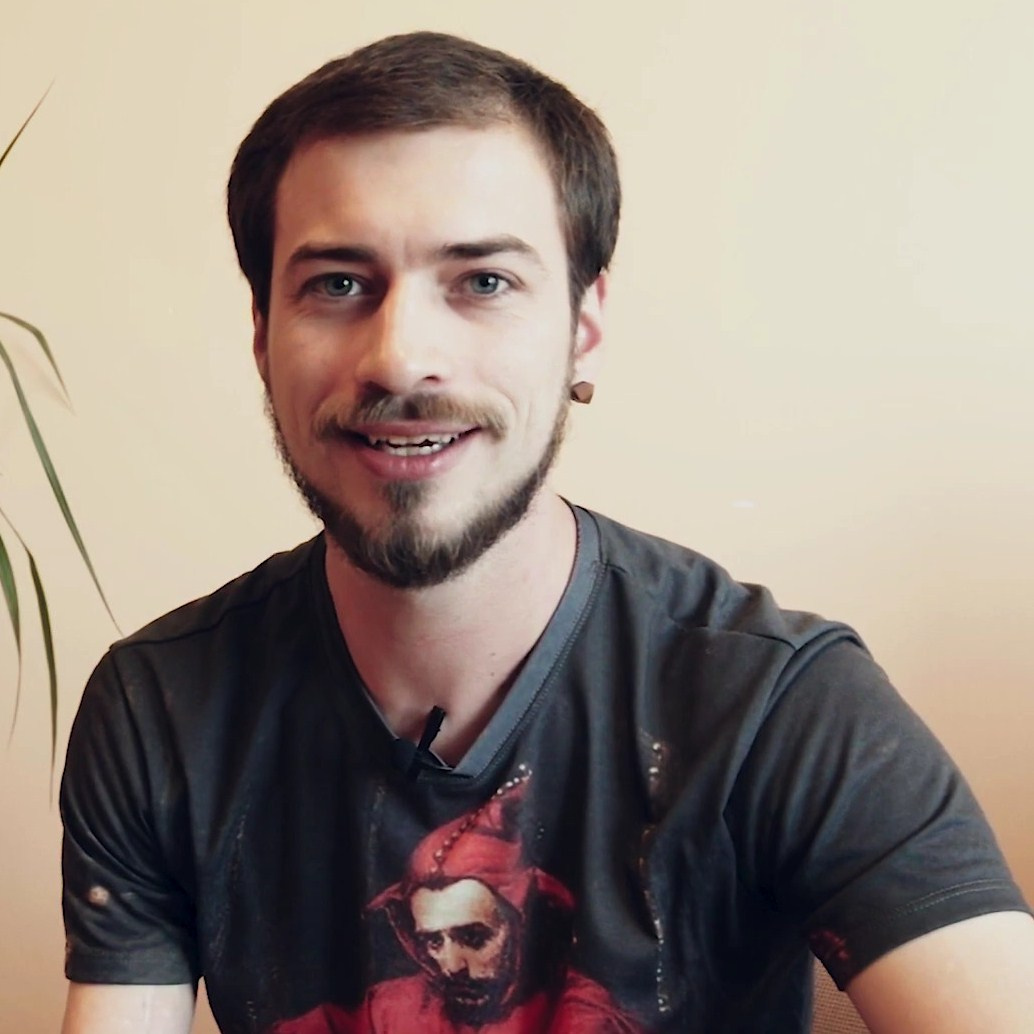
Jan Mela

Jan "Jasiek" Mela (born December 30, 1988, in Gdańsk) is a Polish explorer who, as a teenage double amputee, was the youngest person to reach the North Pole in 2004, and eight months later the South Pole. He created the foundation "Poza Horyzonty" ("Beyond the horizons").

== Loss of limbs ==
In 2002, Jan was 13 years old and was playing table tennis with some school friends in his hometown of Malbork, Poland, when it suddenly started raining heavily. He sheltered from the rain in a nearby electrical transformer building, where he received a 15,000 volt electric shock. The burns and tissue damage sustained meant surgeons had to amputate his left crus and right forearm.

== Polar expeditions ==
As a member of a four-man expedition led by veteran Polish polar explorer Marek Kamiński called "Together to the Pole", Mela reached the North Pole on April 24, 2004, at the age of 15. After nine days of polar acclimatisation in Spitsbergen, Norway, the team began their 70 km trek on April 4, and received no outside assistance, relying solely on the supplies and gear they could pull on sleds.

Eight months later, Mela and Kamiński reached the South Pole in Antarctica on December 31, 2004 – a day after Mela's 16th birthday. On Christmas they ate typical Polish dishes, such as beetroot soup, and they made a Christmas tree from snow.
