= IESE Business School =

Graduate business school in Spain

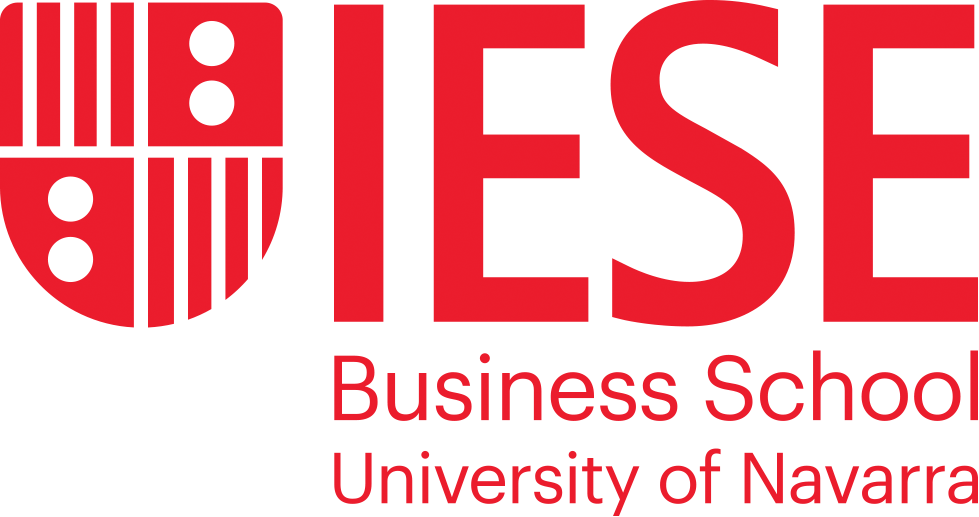
- Type: Business school
- Established: 1958
- Accreditation: AACSB; EQUIS; ANECA
- Affiliations: University of Navarra
- Dean: Franz Heukamp
- Academic staff: 125 (2024–2025)
- Students: 1,672 (2024-25)
- Location: Barcelona; Madrid; Munich; New York; São Paulo
- Language: English
- Website: iese.edu

IESE Business School is the graduate business school of the University of Navarra. It was established in Barcelona in 1958 by Opus Dei. From 1963, in collaboration with Harvard Business School it offers a two-year Master of Business Administration degree. It also offers two Executive MBAs, and master´s degrees (Master in Management and Master in Finance) and executive education courses. It has other campuses in Madrid, Munich, New York City, and São Paulo.

As of 2026, IESE Business School has more than 60,000 alumni worldwide from different countries. It has been recognised by EQUIS, AACSB, and ANECA.

== History ==
In 1957 Antonio Valero Vicente was commissioned by the founder of Opus Dei, Jose María Escriva de Balaguer,to create a school for business leaders based on Christian values. IESE launched its first training project for executives during the 1958-59 academic year, followed by several programs for business leaders. In 1963, the Harvard-IESE Committee was set up, and IESE launched the Master in Business Administration and Economics (MED) in 1964. Collaboration was later extended to other North American universities such as the University of Michigan Ross Business School, the MIT Sloan School of Management and NYU Stern School of Business. IESE began offering programs in Madrid in 1974, opening a campus there in 1991 and expading the campus in 2021. In the following years, the campuses in New York City (2010), Munich (2015), and São Paulo (in collaboration with ISE Business School), were consolidated and opened.

In 2009, the Africa Initiative was created to provide research and teaching support to associated schools on the Continent. This has included faculty training, joint program development, exchange opportunities, conferences and the Africa-focused research and teaching materials.

Since its founding, IESE has created an ecosystem to support entrepreneurs, such as providing seed capital to graduates with promising start-up ideas. It was one of the first schools outside the United States to offer a course on search funds.

== Organization ==
The institution is governed by the Executive Committee and the Supervisory Board, established in 2023 to oversee the Executive Committee and the dean in strategic planning, execution and key decision-making. The Executive Committee is responsible for the strategic development, faculty recruitment, program portfolio and operations of the school.

The International Advisory Board (IAB) and the Executive Committee of the IESE Alumni Association provide strategic guidance to the school's management on its initiatives, governance, education programs, institutional development and corporate sponsorship. The International Advisory Board (IAB) analyses the global socio-economic context from the perspective of business, emerging trends, entrepreneurial and executive education needs and innovation in the field of management and leadership. IAB members are managers and academics from Europe, the Americas, Africa and Asia.

Since 1963, the IESE-Harvard Business School Committee has met annually in the United States or Europe, mainly to advise on the development of international programs.

== Programs ==
Given the importance of entrepreneurship, with 30% of students starting a business within five years of graduation, the entrepreneurial mindset is embedded across all programs through mentoring, networking, funding and research. The institution also promotes entrepreneurship through: Business Angels Network for investors and entrepreneurs and IESE 40under40 Awards.

=== Learning methodologies and innovations ===
IESE’s teaching approach is centered on the case method, pioneered at Harvard, which is used across all programs.

It also employs other methodologies like experiential learning, coaching, mentoring, and business simulations. Since 2025 IESE has had a special focus on artificial intelligence, immersive and lifelong learning. The institution has developed business simulations focused on change management, sustainability, and entrepreneurship.

In 2026, IESE announced a redesign of the full-time MBA program for the 2026–27 academic year, with the transversal integration of artificial intelligence content into first-year courses. The change retains the case method as the foundation of the program and introduces the use of AI tools in case analysis, along with skills related to using these tools, process redesign, and decision-making in contexts of technological change.

=== Degree programs ===
IESE offers specialized master’s, MBAs and doctoral degree programs. During the 2024–25 academic year, these programs included approximately 1,700 participants.

Master in Management

The full-time Master in Management (MiM) offered on the Madrid campus is for recent university graduates. It includes general management foundation with courses marketing, finance, strategy, economics and ethics courses, with the option to specialize in strategy, finance or data.

Master in Finance

The Master in Finance (MiF) is a full-time program for recent university graduates and is offered on the Madrid campus. It covers finance, data analytics, valuation, sustainable finance, AI and leadership, and corporate responsibility. Students choose between three tracks: Corporate Finance; Capital Markets; and Banking and Financial Innovation.

Full-Time MBA

The Full-Time MBA is offered in two formats of 15 or 18 months on IESE´s Barcelona campus. Students choose from concentrations including areas such as finance, data analytics, entrepreneurship, international business, and sustainability. The program includes modules abroad and exchange opportunities with 29 partner institutions around the world.

Executive MBA

The Executive MBA (EMBA) is for experienced professionals and takes place over 18 months. The program has a modular format across several locations, including Madrid, Barcelona, São Paulo, and Munich. It includes elective content and options to study on several campuses.

Global Executive MBA

The Global Executive MBA (GEMBA) is a part-time program for senior executives that includes online instruction and on-campus modules in multiple international business hubs such as the United States, Germany, Singapore and Spain.

PhD in Management

The PhD in Management is based at IESE’s Barcelona campus, and includes the Master of Research in Management. PhD students can participate in academic seminars, conferences, and interdisciplinary research opportunities.

=== Executive education programs ===
The business school offers executive management programs in Munich, New York and São Paulo and in the Spanish cities of Barcelona, Madrid, Santiago de Compostela, Valencia and Zaragoza.

These programs include: the Programa de Desarrollo Directivo (PDD); the Program for Management Development; the Programa de Dirección General (PDG); the General Management Program; the C-Suite Pathway Program, offered jointly with New York University Stern School of Business; the Leadership Coaching Program; the Programa de Alta Dirección de Empresas (PADE); the Advanced Management Program; the Global CEO Program, offered jointly with the MIT Sloan School of Management; Value Creation for Effective Boards, offered jointly with Harvard Business School; and the High-Performance Board Member, offered jointly with the WHU - Otto Beisheim School of Management.

The institution also offers specialised programs in artificial intelligence, sustainability and strategic management; leadership for professionals in the public and healthcare sectors; coaching and specialised training for entrepreneurs through its School of Founders.

=== Online and hybrid programs ===
The school openly offers several massive open online courses on Coursera in corporate finance, marketing, scalability, operations, organisational behaviour, strategy and sustainability, as well as specialisations in communication, management, finance and design thinking.

Over time, the institution has expanded blended teaching and learning in several of its executive training programs, combining online and face-to-face modules. Since the Covid-19 pandemic, the programs offered in this format have grown and now include: the Program for Management Development (PMD), the Flexible Management Development Program (PDD Flex), the C-Suite Pathway Program, the Leadership Coaching Program and several specific programs.

== International alliances and partnerships ==
Since the late 1950s, the institution has sent faculty members to doctoral programs in the United States and Europe. It has established long-term academic partnerships with Stanford, MIT and CEIBS.

IESE collabotes with universities around the world for its executive education programs, including the University of Michigan Ross Business School, the MIT Sloan School of Management, NYU Stern School of Business, and the WHU – Otto Beisheim School of Management.

== Campuses ==
=== Barcelona ===
The Barcelona campus, where the School was founded, features more than a dozen buildings.The Barcelona campus is home to MBA programs and a wide range of Executive Education programs.

=== Madrid ===
The Madrid campus was founded in 1974 and offers the Master in Management, Master in Finance, Executive MBA, several executive education programs and a special program for public sector managers. The campus is located in Aravaca, a northwestern suburb of Madrid.

=== New York City ===
IESE opened its mid-town Manhattan campus in 2007.The campus delivers custom programs for companies and general management programs for executives, including the C-Suite Pathway program.

=== Munich ===
The centrally located Munich campus, founded in 2015, focuses on Executive Education programs for companies and professionals in Germany and Central Europe. It offers the Executive MBA program and courses included in the MBA and Global Executive MBA programs, as well as the General Management Program (GMP).

=== São Paulo ===
Since 2000 IESE´s activity in Brazil has been carried out at ISE Business School in São Paulo. In addition to the general management programs for executives, it offers the Executive MBA.

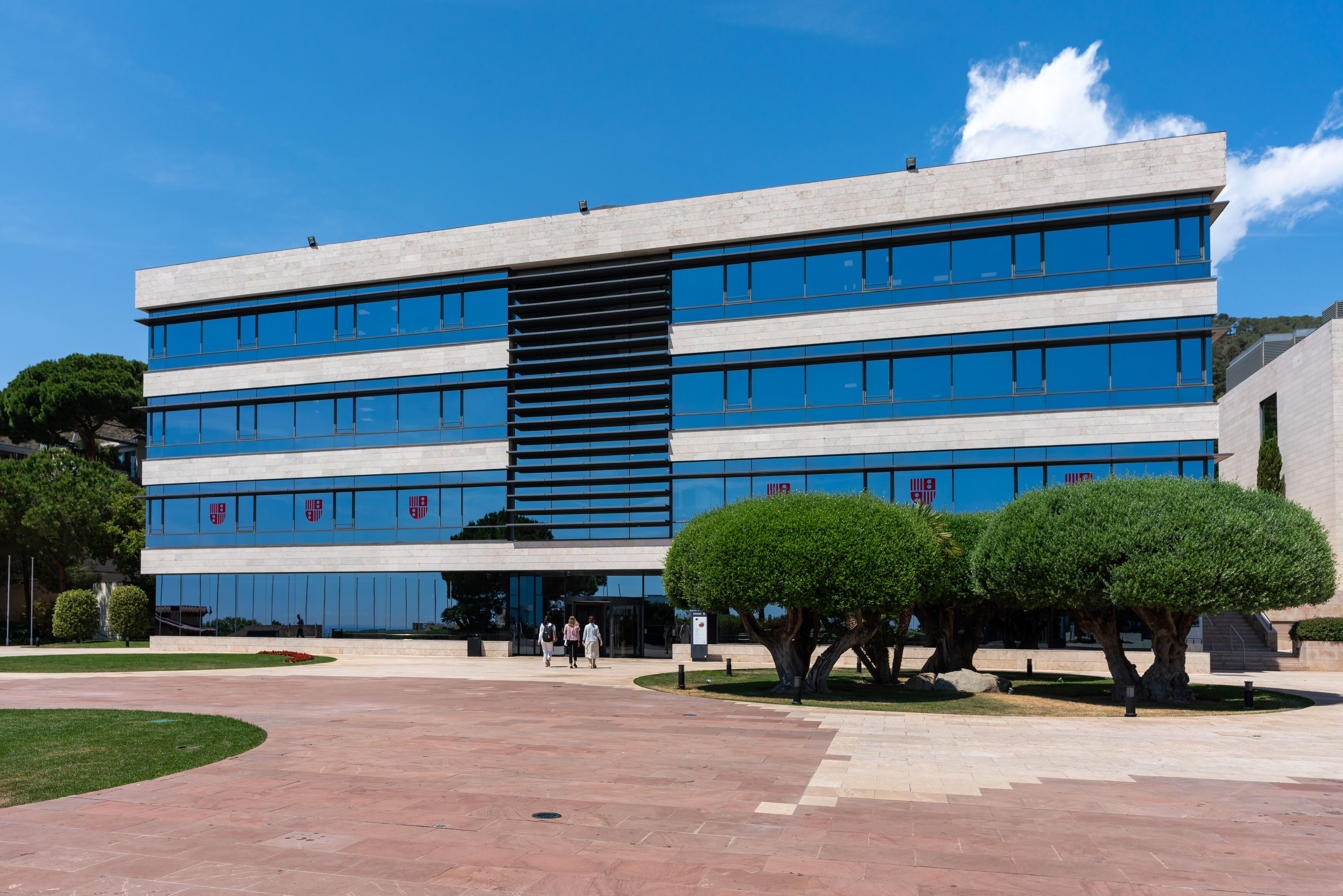
Barcelona

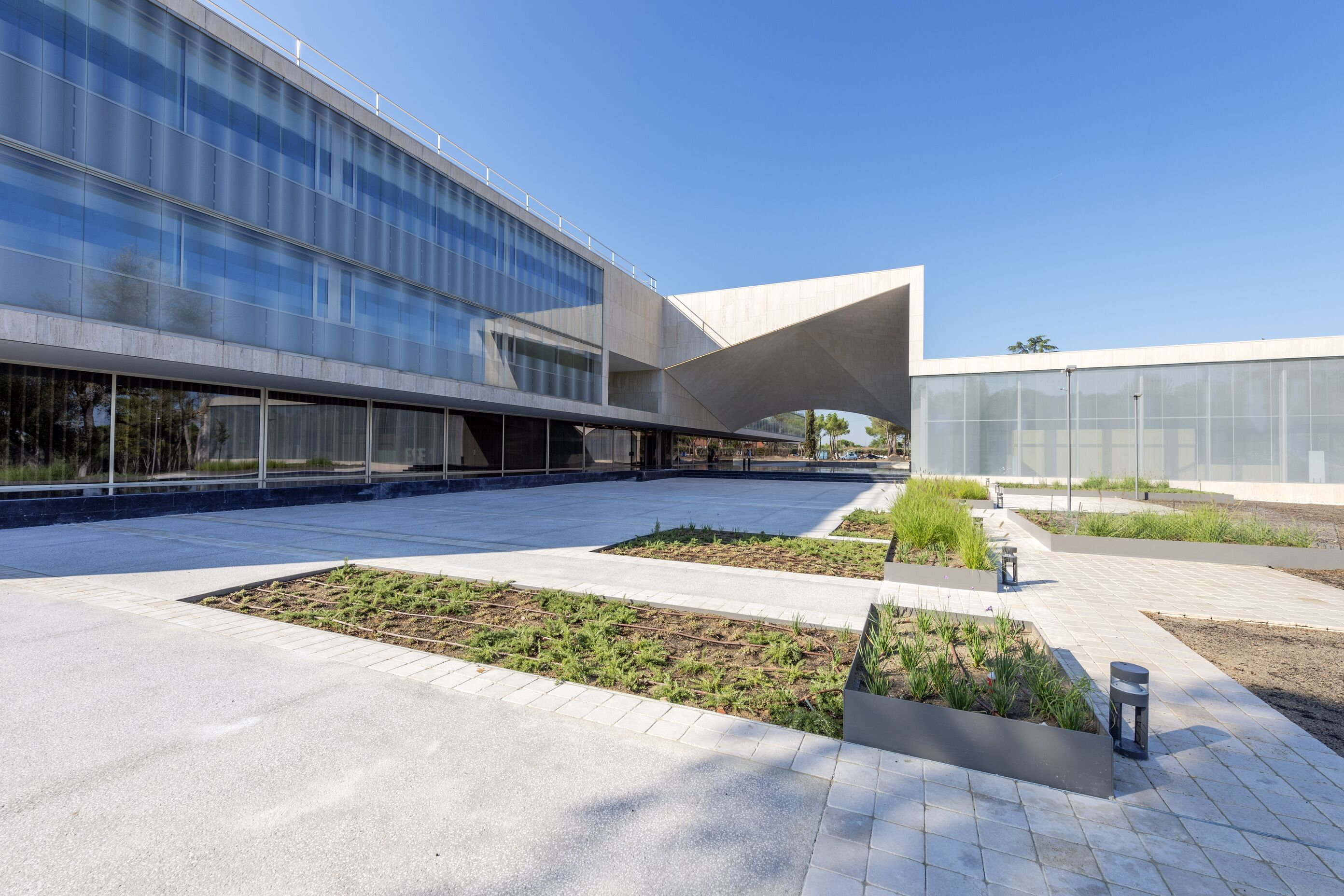
Madrid

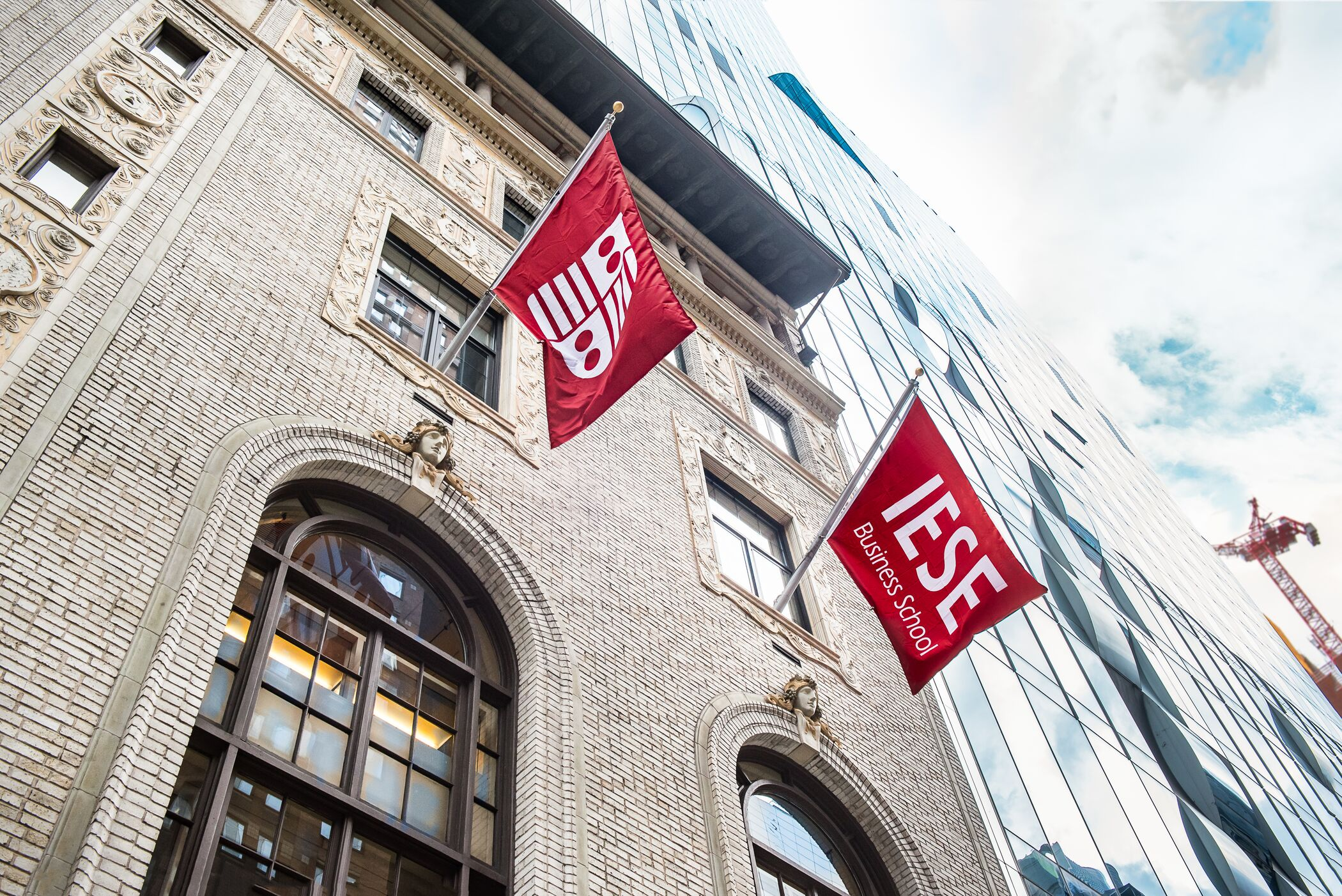
New York

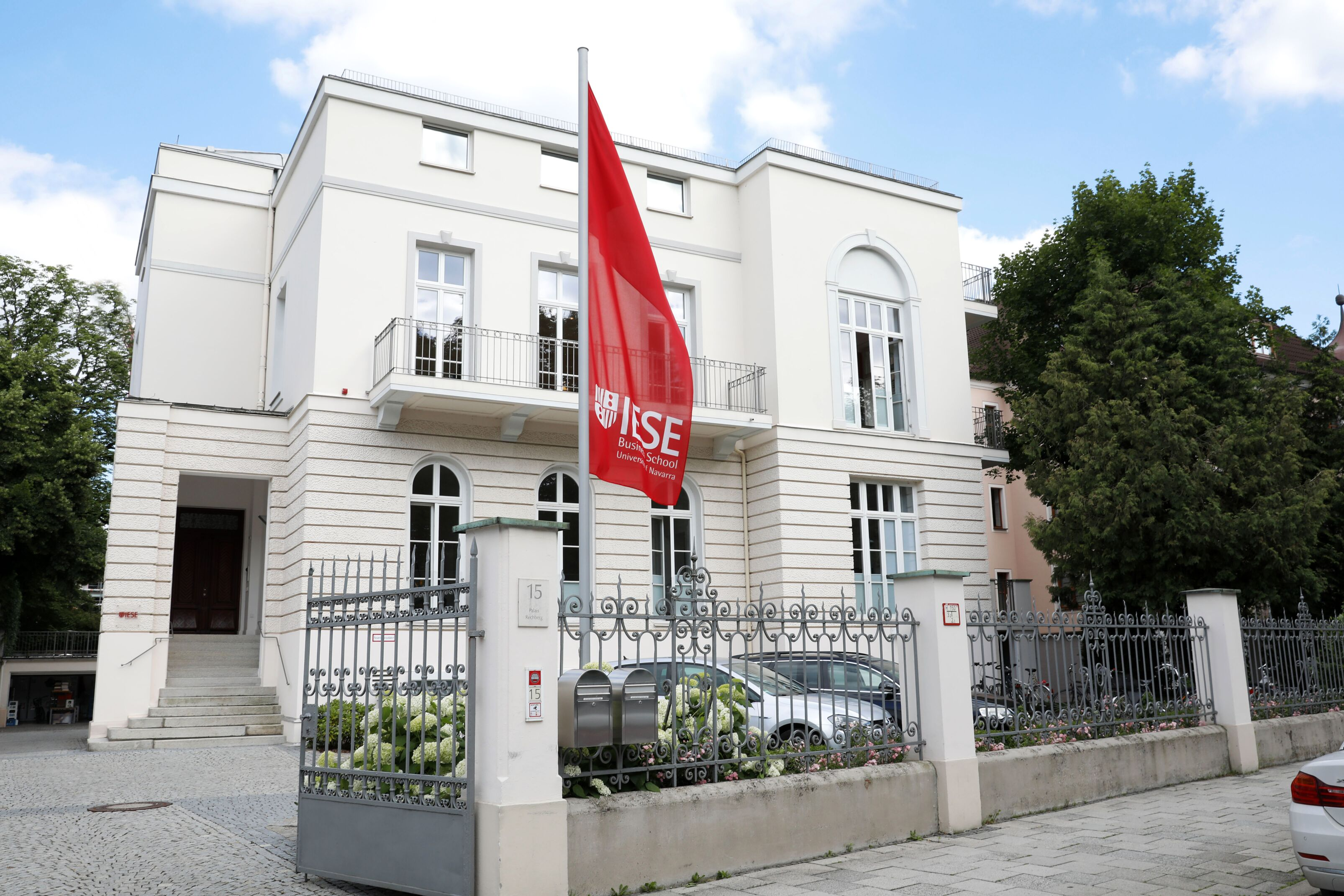
Munich

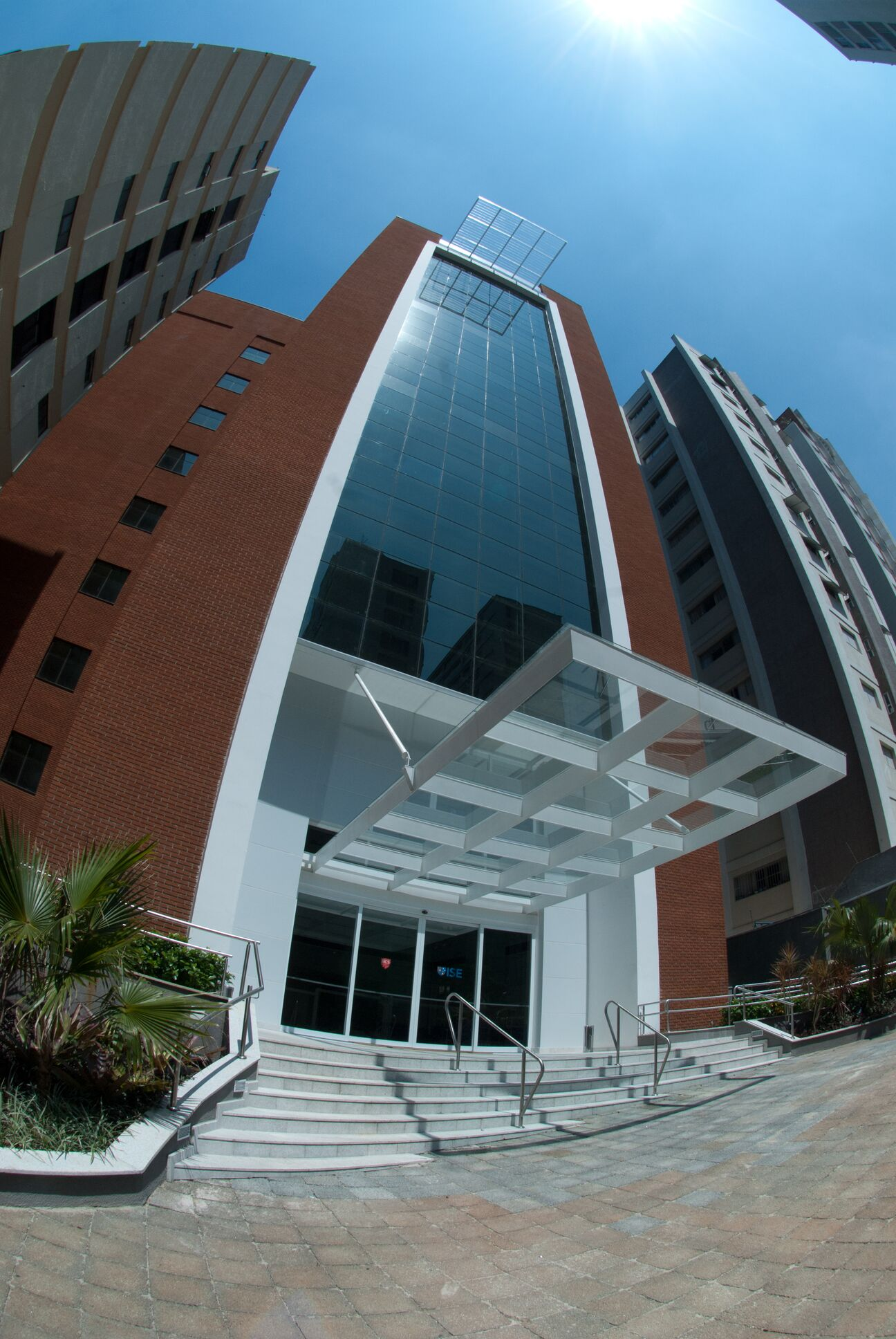
São Paulo

== Research ==
The research in particular business areas is conducted through chairs with leading companies and foundations, including Abertis, Alcatel-Lucent, Banco Sabadell, CaixaBank, Banco Santander, Indra, Nissan, SEAT, Puig, Schneider Electric, and Intent HQ.

Research is also carried out in different centres, led by professors and with a team of researchers. Companies and specialised organisations collaborate with them: Center for Business in Society, Center for Corporate Governance, Center for Globalization and Strategy, Center for Innovation Marketing and Strategy (CIMS), Center for International Finance (CIF), Center for Public Leadership and Government, Center for Research in Healthcare Innovation Management, Entrepreneurship Innovation Center, Institute for Media and Entertainment, International Center for Logistics Research, International Center for Work and Family, and Public-Private Sector Research Center. Since 2025, IESE also began collaborating with the Eurofirms Foundation Research Fund in Leadership for Embracing Inclusion, specialized in recognition and connectedness in organizations.

In 2021, the institution launched the Institute for Sustainability Leadership (ISL) to promote the exchange of knowledge and experience between the academic and business worlds. The ISL, led by Professor Fabrizio Ferraro, is generating knowledge on the monitoring and measurement of green targets, governance systems for sustainable cities and financial instruments for impact investment.

In 2023, the Artificial Intelligence and the Future of Management Initiative was launched. It analyzes how artificial intelligence affects management and the ethical use of AI in companies. In 2025, IESE created the Business Leadership and the Future of Work Chair position sponsored by the Joaquim Molins Figueras Foundation.

The same year, IESE became a founding member of Business Schools for Climate Leadership (BS4CL), together with other leading business schools in Europe. The alliance produces research and insights that prepare business leaders to face the climate transition and integrate environmentally-friendly practices into business.

In March 2025, the institution inaugurated the IESE Sports Management Centre, which aims to promote global leadership and professionalisation in the sports industry. RCD Espanyol de Barcelona is a strategic partner in the project.

== Reputation and rankings ==
IESE is certified by the Association to Advance Collegiate Schools of Business (AACSB), Florida, the EFMD Quality Improvement System (EQUIS), Brussels, and the Spanish ANECA.

It consistently ranks in the top five of international rankings for executive education, MBA, and Executive MBA programs. Its Global MBA was ranked third in the world by the Financial Times in 2025 and first among European business schools. The Executive MBA was ranked fourth globally in the FT Executive MBA Ranking 2024 and second worldwide in the QS Executive MBA Rankings 2025. In 2026, the Financial Times ranked the MiM programme amongst the top 10 worldwide, placing it in eighth position.

Business school rankings

Europe
- QS MBA: 5
- Financial Times MBA: 2

Global
- QS MBA: 10
- Financial Times MBA: 3

	2022	2023	2024	2025
FT - Global MBA	10	3	5	3
QS - Executive EMBA	1	2	2	3
FT - Executive Education - Open	3	1	2	3
FT - Executive Education - Customized	3	4	2	7

== Faculty ==
At 2026 IESE’s full-time faculty is made up of 125 professors from 24 nationalities, who specialize in diverse topics including artificial intelligence, business ethics, corporate governance, economics, entrepreneurship and sustainability. The research of IESE faculty appears in journals, books, book chapters and case studies.

- Núria Mas, Professor of Economics and Jaime Grego Chair of Global Healthcare Management
- Xavier Vives, Professor Emeritus of Economics and Financial Management, former Abertis Chair of Regulation, Competition and Public Policy and former academic director of the Public-Private Research Center
- Jordi Canals, Professor of Strategic Management and Fundación IESE Chair in Corporate Governance
- Pankaj Ghemawat, Professor Emeritus of Strategic Management
- Pablo Hernández de Cos, former Professor of Economics
- Alfredo Pastor, Professor Emeritus of Economics

== Alumni ==
The first alumni chapter was that of Catalonia, created in 1961. Regional groups for Valencia (Levante), Mallorca (Balearic Islands) and Madrid were established soon after, followed by Aragon (1973), Andalucia (1975), and Galicia, La Rioja, the Basque Country and Navarre (1986). The Argentine-Uruguayan chapter became the first foreign chapter in 1986; the U.S. alumni chapter was set up in 1987. In Warsaw (Poland) the alumni chapter is very significant, with 643 members in 2024.

In 2021, an alumni meeting held at the expanded Madrid campus was attended by more than 5000 executives and business people. In 2025, the Global Alumni Meeting, which was held at the Madrid campus, was focused on artificial intelligence and business and was attended by more than 1,800 executives.

=== Notable alumni ===
- Ibukun Awosika, chairman, First Bank of Nigeria
- Antonio Brufau Niubó, CEO and chairman of the multinational oil and gas company Repsol
- Lucía Casanueva, founder and CEO of Proa Comunicación
- Joan Clos, former mayor of Barcelona
- Francisco García Paramés, former CEO of Bestinver
- Cristina Garmendia, former Minister of Science and Innovation for the Spanish Government
- Manel Guillen, businessman, lawyer and activist investor
- Marek Kamiński, explorer, author and entrepreneur
- Ana Maiques, CEO, Neuroelectrics
- Janne Haaland Matláry, Norwegian political scientist, writer, and politician
- Vicente Lopez Ibor Mayor, former commissioner of the Spanish National Energy Commission
- Diana Mondino, Argentinian Foreign Minister in the elected government of Javier Milei
- Jorge Moreira da Silva, ex-Minister of Environment, Territorial Planning and Energy in Portugal
- Sheila Mwarangu, civil and structural engineer
- Hans van der Noordaa, chairman and CEO of the Retail Division, ING Netherlands and ING Group N.V
- Luis Enrique Yarur Rey, president, Banco de Crédito e Inversiones (BCI)
- Miguel Sanz, General Management Program GMP - 1997, Navarre former president of the Government, Spain
- Rafael Tamames, entrepreneur and author, founder of the customer and brand experience consultancy Findasense
- Pablo Tovar, senior management coach, a fellow of Oxford Leadership
- Cristina García-Orcoyen Tormo, politician
- Camille Villar, politician, member of the Philippine House of Representatives
- Louis Alphonse de Bourbon, CEO de Borvar
- Juan Antonio Samaranch, former president of the International Olympic Committee
- Juvencio Maeztu, CEO of IKEA
- Toni Ruiz, CEO of Mango

== Bibliography ==
- Canals, J. (2016). IESE's global development: the purpose and impact of the Harvard Business School-IESE committee. IESE's global development, 1-108. Universidad de Navarra.
