= Oxford Leadership Academy =

Management training company

The Oxford Leadership Academy (OLA) is an international leadership training consultancy with its headquarters in Oxford, United Kingdom. The firm specialises in leadership development, strategy execution and culture change in complex global organisations. It has 900,000 alumni and 215 consultants and associates in 28 countries.

OLA, is one of the branches of The Oxford Leadership Group (OLG). Another branch of OLG is the Oxford Leadership Limited which license the consultants.

== Brian Bacon and IPC (1983 - 2005) ==
The founder of Oxford Leadership Academy (OLA) Brian Bacon first started working with leadership in 1983 when he formed the management consulting branch of the global advertising agency DDB Needham. Through a buy-out in 1990, the branch separated from DDB Needham and became International Pacific Consulting (IPC) which would later be renamed to Oxford Leadership Academy.

IPC worked with several big actors such as McDonald’s during the following years. Charlie Bell, who was the CEO of McDonald’s in 2003 contacted Bacon and his company due to a massive decline in stock market value, from 42 cents to 11 cents. Brian Bacon and his team worked with renewing the public image of McDonald’s and this led to a more focus on the environmental work of McDonald’s, as well as changes to the products and the supply chain. The McDonald’s stock started to recover and doubled in value over 6 months, although this success cannot be solely accredited to IPC.

== Oxford Leadership Academy (2005 - present) ==
IPC tied up with Oxford Research in 1996 which was the first step in the rebranding of the company. But it was first in 2005 when the company moved its headquarters to Oxford, England, that the company changed its name to Oxford Leadership Academy.

The company have served a wide array of large-scale corporations. In 2007 their client list included corporations such as Ford, Ericsson, Coca-Cola, BP, Horwath International, Barclays, Unilever, McDonald's, Sandvik, GE, Fortis, Pharmacia, SAAB, British Aerospace and Volvo.

In 2020 Brian Bacon stated on Linkedin that through their digital courses that Oxford Leadership Academy has been engaging with new clients such as Virgin Media, Sky, Adobe, HSBC, Imperial College, Maersk, Everest, Computacenter and JCET. He also stated that Oxford leadership had been forming partnerships with corporations such as ExoWorld, OpenExo, Dakia Digital, Mindset Practice, Aeyons, Harthill for LDF assessment and Cross Knowledge to grow the corporation digitally in 2021.

== Administration ==
Dr. Kim Moller is co-founder and President of Oxford Leadership in Nordic Region and Chairman of the Oxford Research, a sister company of Oxford Leadership. He is a strategist and researcher, formerly with Copenhagen Business School.

Brian Bacon is Chairman and Founder of Oxford Leadership Academy. He was previously a Founding Trustee and President of World Business Academy. He was a mentor and strategy advisor to McDonald's CEO Charlie Bell from 2002 to 2005; a special advisor to Mexican president Vicente Fox and the Office of Government Innovation from 2002 to 2006. He was a special advisor to the Swedish Government in the modernization of the Foreign Ministry from 2004 to 2006. He is a former visiting scholar at the International Institute of Labour Studies in Geneva and has been an advisor to the governments of Australia, Brazil, Chile, Mexico, Thailand and Sweden.

The Supervisory Board of Oxford Leadership Academy comprises Brian Bacon (Chairman) Jonathan Yukawa (Managing Director) Kyle Hermans ( Senior Partner)

== Awards ==
In 1997, Brian Bacon was awarded the Willis Harman Award by the World Business Academy.

In 2006, Brian Bacon received the INNOVA Award from the Mexican president Vicente Fox, one of only 10 commendations given during his term.
