= Miss World Venezuela 2002 =

3rd Miss World Venezuela pageant

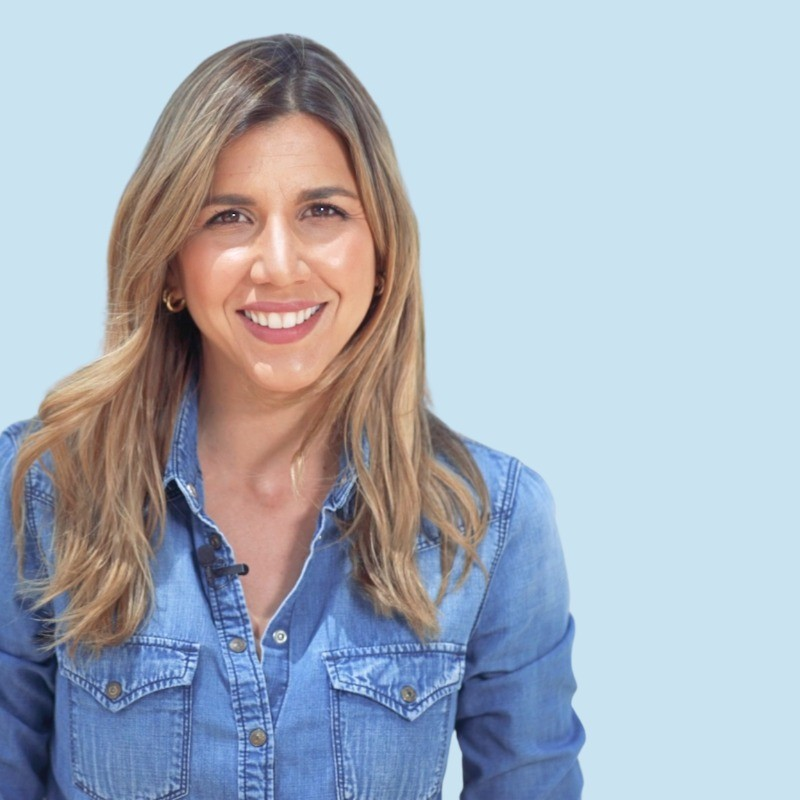
- Goizeder Azúa, Miss World Venezuela 2002
- Date: August 31, 2002
- Presenters: Viviana Gibelli
- Entertainment: Propuesta Indecente; Tisuby & Georgina; La Factoría; Luis Fonsi
- Venue: Venevisión Studios, Caracas, Venezuela
- Broadcaster: International: Univisión; Venevisión Continental; DirecTV; Official broadcaster: Venevisión
- Entrants: 27
- Placements: 1
- Winner: Goizeder Azúa; Carabobo
- Congeniality: Goizeder Azúa (Carabobo)
- Photogenic: Vanessa Fanessi (Yaracuy)
- Smile: Vanessa Fanessi (Yaracuy)

Miss World Venezuela 2002 was the 3rd Miss World Venezuela pageant. It was held at the Venevisión Studios in Caracas, Venezuela on August 31, 2002.

At the end of the event, Andreína Prieto of Zulia crowned Goizeder Azúa of Carabobo as Miss World Venezuela 2002. She represented Venezuela at the Miss World 2002 pageant placing in the Top 10. Then she was appointed and won the Miss International 2003 pageant.

== Background ==
In the first two editions of Miss World Venezuela, the candidates did not represent Venezuelan states, but were instead listed, as they were preselected delegates who would later become Miss Venezuela candidates. In this edition, the candidates represented states for the first time.

== Pageant ==
=== Selection committee ===
The judges for Miss World Venezuela include:

- Paolo Latorre – Businessman
- Paula Jaramillo – L'Bel marketing manager
- Irene Royo – Agatha Paris president
- Joseph Daubert – Medical Meausrement Company Tanita's president
- Nohely Arteaga – Actress
- Roger Martínez – Tuna Margarita business coordinator
- Alessandro Nocerino – Defile by Osmel president
- Luisa Lucchi – President of Lucchi Footwear
- Ramiro Finol – Businessman
- Gira de Nogueira – Ruy Nogueira's wife, Brazilian ambasador in Venezuela
- Moisés Kaswan – Miss Venezuela Organization dentist
- Evangelina Villambrosa – Roberto Óscar Villambrosa's wife, Argentinean ambasador in Venezuela
- Eduardo Krulig – Plastic surgeon
- Tatania Irizar – 'Estrellas de la Música' host, Miss Táchira 1996 and 2nd runner-up in Miss Venezuela 1996
- Julio Andrew – General Manager of Promotion and Business Development of Telcel
- Sara Halcblat – Lawyer
- Giovanni Calandriello – Nail Paint Sally Hansen general manager

== Results ==
=== Miss World Venezuela ===
- Declared as winner
- Ended as runner-up or top 5/8 qualification
- Ended as one of the finalists or semifinalists

Placement	Contestant	International Placement
Miss World Venezuela 2002	Carabobo – Goizeder Azúa	Top 10 — Miss World 2002

=== Miss International Venezuela ===
Placement	Contestant	International Placement
Miss International Venezuela 2003	Carabobo – Goizeder Azúa	Miss International 2003

=== Special awards ===
Award	Contestant
Miss Photogenic (voted by press reporters)	Yaracuy – Vanessa Fanessi
Miss Internet (voted by www.missvenezuela.com viewers)	Portuguesa – Maria Fernanda León
Miss Congeniality (Miss Congeniality Lucchi) (voted by Miss Venezuela contestants)	Carabobo – Goizeder Azúa
Miss Figure (Figura Pepsi Light)	Distrito Capital – Amara Barroeta
Miss Personality (Miss Personaliad Lady Speed Stick)	Carabobo – Goizeder Azúa
Best Hair (El Cabello Más Bello Palmolive Optimus)	Vargas – Maria Andreina Abrahamz
Best Smile (La Sonrisa Más Linda Colgate Sensation)	Yaracuy – Vanessa Fanessi
Best Face (Miss Rostro L'Bel)	Portuguesa – Maria Fernanda León
Best Runway (Miss Defilé Fashion Team)	Carabobo – Goizeder Azúa
Best Skin (Miss Piel Palmolive Botanical's)	Amazonas – Aída Yéspica

== Contestants ==
27 contestants competed for the title.

State	Contestant	Age (Note: Ages at the time of the pageant)	Height	Hometown
Amazonas	Aída María Yéspica Jaime	20	173 cm (5 ft 8 in)	Barquisimeto
Anzoátegui	Jessika Gabriela Marcano Román	18	172 cm (5 ft 7 1/2 in)	Valera
Apure	Johanna Alejandra Madureri Perea	21	174 cm (5 ft 8 1/2 in)	Caracas
Aragua	Mariángel Ruíz Torrealba	22	178 cm (5 ft 10 in)	San Juan de los Morros
Barinas	Erika Aulimar Lozada Ferretti	21	174 cm (5 ft 8 1/2 in)	El Tocuyo
Bolívar	Mercedes Carolina González Navarro	17	174 cm (5 ft 8 1/2 in)	Ciudad Guayana
Carabobo	Goizeder Victoria Azúa Barrios	18	178 cm (5 ft 10 in)	San Felipe
Cojedes	Kim Gabriela Loewenthal	22	174 cm (5 ft 8 1/2 in)	Caracas
Costa Oriental	Yasmely Coromoto Pérez Martínez	23	175 cm (5 ft 9 in)	Maracaibo
Delta Amacuro	Gilger Dayana Márquez Gudiño	19	182 cm (5 ft 11 1/2 in)	Caracas
Dependencias Federales	Sabrina Salemi Nicoloso	19	173 cm (5 ft 8 in)	Caracas
Distrito Capital	Amara Elyn Barroeta Seijas	18	179 cm (5 ft 10 1/2 in)	Caracas
Falcón	Diana del Valle Cocho Bracho	18	172 cm (5 ft 7 1/2 in)	Punto Fijo
Guárico	Alejandra Pulido Aranzo	25	171 cm (5 ft 7 1/2 in)	Caracas
Lara	Karelit Coromoto Yépez Morillo	21	178 cm (5 ft 10 in)	Barquisimeto
Mérida	Maiti de Sousa do Nascimento	18	171 cm (5 ft 7 1/2 in)	Maracaibo
Miranda	Melissa Alexandra Wolf Ehrenzeller	21	182 cm (5 ft 11 1/2 in)	Caracas
Monagas	Enid Solsiret Herrera Ramírez	20	177 cm (5 ft 9 1/2 in)	Maturín
Nueva Esparta	Driva Ysabella Cedeño Salazar	22	181 cm (5 ft 11 1/2 in)	Porlamar
Península Goajira	María Virginia Bastidas Ilukewitch	23	172 cm (5 ft 7 1/2 in)	Maracaibo
Portuguesa	María Fernanda León Pinto	20	176 cm (5 ft 9 1/2 in)	Valencia
Sucre	Maria Carolina Casado Chópite	18	172 cm (5 ft 7 1/2 in)	Cumaná
Táchira	Ix-Balanke Tibisay Montilva Mora	17	178 cm (5 ft 10 in)	San Cristóbal
Trujillo	Anaís Verónica Gómez Carrascal	19	177 cm (5 ft 9 1/2 in)	Caracas
Vargas	María Andreína Abrahamz	20	179 cm (5 ft 10 1/2 in)	Caracas
Yaracuy	Vanessa Carolina Fanessi Auteri	23	172 cm (5 ft 7 1/2 in)	Valencia
Zulia	Ana Graciela Quintero Nava	20	182 cm (5 ft 11 1/2 in)	Maracaibo
