= List of Miss Venezuela contestants =

This is a list of contestants in the Miss Venezuela pageant:

- 1975- María Conchita Alonso (actress & singer)
- 1980- Hilda Abrahamz (actress)
- 1981- Irene Saez (politician)
- 1981- Pilín León (writer)
- 1982- Michelle Shoda (actress & businesswoman)
- 1984- Astrid Carolina Herrera (actress)
- 1986- Maite Delgado (television host)
- 1986- Catherine Fulop (actress)
- 1987- Viviana Gibelli (television host, actress & singer)
- 1987- Inés María Calero (actress)
- 1987- Viviana Gibelli (television host, actress & singer)
- 1989- Fabiola Candosin (author & actress)
- 1989- Carolina Omaña (actress)
- 1992- Gabriela Spanic (actress)
- 1995- Alicia Machado (actress)
- 1999- Marjorie de Sousa (actress)
- 2002- Mariángel Ruiz (actress & television host)
- 2007- Dayana Mendoza (actress)
- 2008- Stefanía Fernández (television host)
- 2011- Irene Esser (actress)
- 2012- Gabriela Isler (television host)
