= Cynthia Lander =

Venezuelan actress, TV host and beauty-pageant titleholder

- Born: Cynthia Cristina Lander Zamora; June 10, 1982 (age 44); Caracas, Venezuela
- Height: 5 ft 11 in (1.80 m)
- Spouse: Carlos Martel (m. 2011)
- Beauty pageant titleholder
- Title: Miss Venezuela 2001
- Hair color: Brown
- Eye color: Blue
- Major competitions: Miss Venezuela 2001 (Winner) (Miss Figure); Miss Universe 2002 (4th Runner-Up); Miss International 2002 (Unplaced)

Cynthia Cristina Lander Zamora (Spanish pronunciation: [ˈsintja lanˈdeɾ]; born June 10, 1982, in Caracas) is a Venezuelan actress, TV host and beauty pageant titleholder who represented her country at Miss Universe 2002 and Miss International 2002.

== Personal life ==
Born in Caracas, Lander moved to the United States at age 11 and returned to Venezuela when she was 16.

On September 24, 2011, Lander married her boyfriend of two years, businessman Carlos Martel Izaguirre.

== Pageant participation ==
=== Miss Venezuela 2001 ===
Lander participated in Miss Venezuela 2001 representing Distrito Capital where she beat out 25 other women for the title of Miss Venezuela 2001, gaining the right to represent her country at Miss Universe 2002.

=== Miss Universe 2002 ===
Lander represented Venezuela at Miss Universe 2002, held on May 29, 2002, in San Juan, Puerto Rico, finishing as 4th Runner-Up.

=== Miss International 2002 ===
Lander was also appointed to compete in Miss International 2002, held on September 30, 2002, in Tokyo, Japan, failing to place in the semifinals.

== Facts ==
- She received firefighter training prior to the Miss Universe 2002 contest. She was motivated to work with the firefighters due to the Vargas tragedy that occurred in Vargas State, Venezuela in December 1999.
- She is related to Miss Venezuela 1981 and Miss Universe 1981 Irene Sáez.

== See also ==
- Miss Venezuela

Awards and achievements
Preceded by Aura Zambrano	Miss Venezuela International; 2002	Succeeded by Goizeder Azua
Preceded by Celina Jaitley	Miss Universe 4th Runner-Up; 2002	Succeeded by (Japan) Miyako Miyazaki
Preceded by Eva Ekvall	Miss Venezuela; 2001	Succeeded by Mariángel Ruiz
Preceded by Dahilmar del Valle Toledo	Miss Distrito Capital; 2001	Succeeded by Amara Barroeta
