= Miss Venezuela 2002 =

49th edition of the Miss Venezuela competition

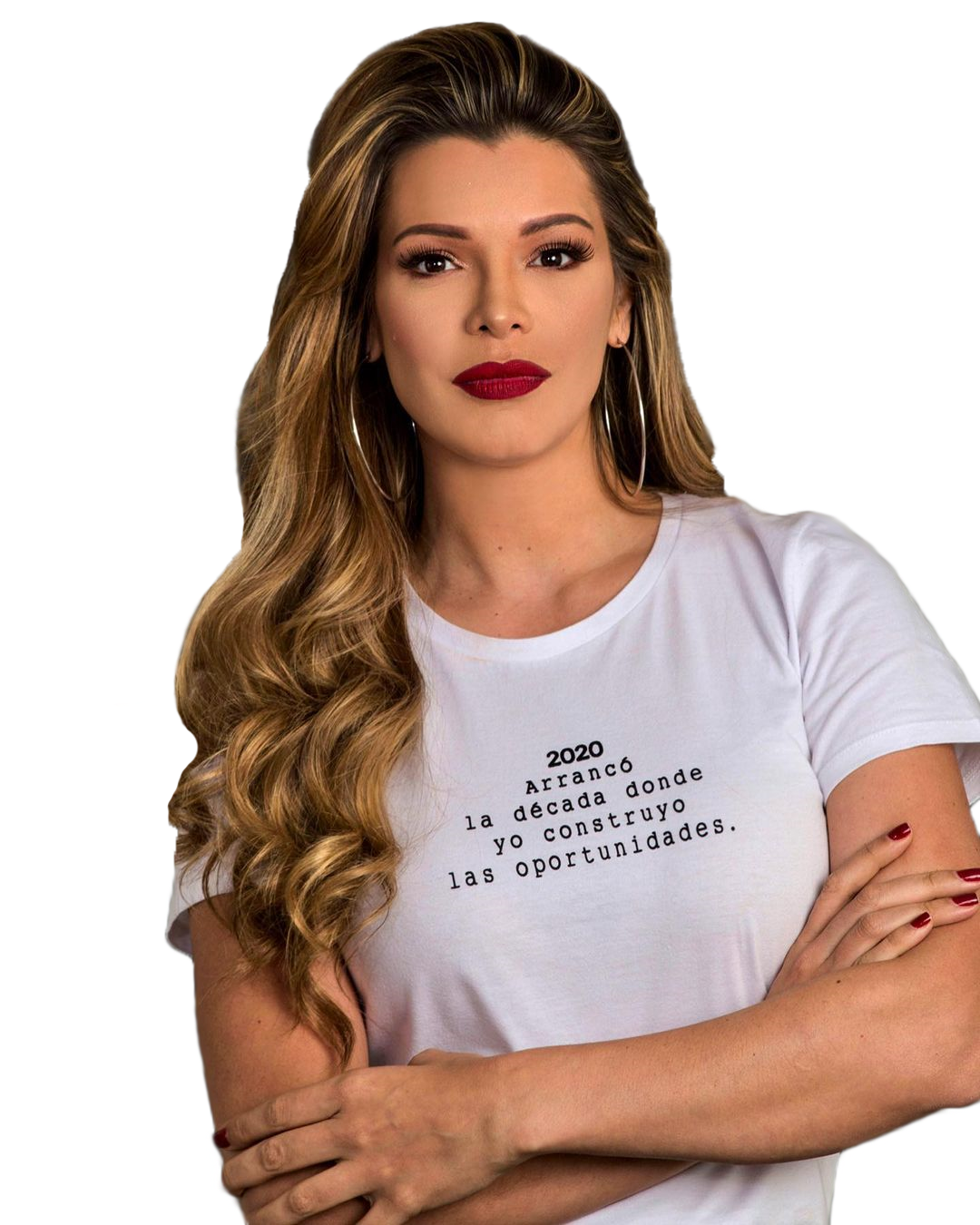
- Mariangel Ruiz
- Date: September 20, 2002
- Presenters: Gilberto Correa; Maite Delgado
- Entertainment: Patricia Manterola; Karina; Guillermo Dávila
- Venue: Poliedro de Caracas, Caracas, Venezuela
- Broadcaster: Venevision
- Entrants: 27
- Placements: 10
- Winner: Mariangel Ruiz; Aragua
- Congeniality: Goizeder Azua (Carabobo)
- Personality: Goizeder Azua (Carabobo)
- Photogenic: Vanessa Fanessi (Yaracuy)

Miss Venezuela 2002 was the forty-ninth Miss Venezuela pageant, held at the Poliedro de Caracas in Caracas, Venezuela, on September 20, 2002.

Cynthia Lander crowned Mariangel Ruiz of Aragua as her successor at the end of the event.

The 2002 edition also served as the golden jubilee celebration of the pageant, celebrating a half century of achievements and glories that have defined the competition and all those who have competed.

== Results ==
=== Placements ===
Placement	Contestant
Miss Venezuela 2002	Aragua – Mariángel Ruiz
Miss Venezuela World 2002	Carabobo – Goizeder Azúa (*)
1st Runner-Up	Distrito Capital – Amara Barroeta
2nd Runner-Up	Nueva Esparta – Driva Cedeño
3rd Runner-Up	Miranda – Melissa Wolf
4th Runner-Up	Zulia – Ana Quintero
Top 10	Anzoátegui – Jéssika Marcano; Monagas – Solsiret Herrera; Portuguesa – María Fernanda León; Táchira – Tibisay Montilva; Yaracuy – Vanessa Fanessi

(*) Goizeder Azua (Carabobo) was crowned Miss World Venezuela 2002 during the Gala de Belleza (Preliminary) show, on August 31, 2002. The title of Miss Carabobo was then vacated for the final Miss Venezuela 2002 competition.

=== Special awards ===
- Miss Photogenic (voted by press reporters) - Vanessa Fanessi (Yaracuy)
- Miss Internet (voted by www.missvenezuela.com viewers) - Maria Fernanda León (Portuguesa)
- Miss Congeniality (voted by Miss Venezuela contestants) - Goizeder Azua (Carabobo)
- Miss Figure - Amara Barroeta (Distrito Capital)
- Miss Personality - Goizeder Azua (Carabobo)
- Best Hair - Maria Andreina Abrahamz (Vargas)
- Best Smile - Vanessa Fanessi (Yaracuy)
- Best Face - Maria Fernanda León (Portuguesa)
- Best Runway - Goizeder Azua (Carabobo)
- Best Skin - Aida Yespica (Amazonas)

== Contestants ==
The Miss Venezuela 2002 delegates are:

State	Contestant	Age	Height	Hometown
Amazonas	Aida María Yespica Jaime	20	175 cm (5 ft 9 in)	Barquisimeto
Anzoátegui	Jessika Gabriela Marcano Román	18	172 cm (5 ft 7 1/2 in)	Valera
Apure	Johanna Alejandra Madureri Perea	21	174 cm (5 ft 8 1/2 in)	Caracas
Aragua	Mariangel Ruiz Torrealba	22	176 cm (5 ft 9 1/2 in)	Maracay
Barinas	Erika Aulimar Lozada Ferretti	21	174 cm (5 ft 8 1/2 in)	El Tocuyo
Bolívar	Mercedes Carolina González Navarro	17	174 cm (5 ft 8 1/2 in)	Ciudad Guayana
Carabobo	Goizeder Victoria Azua Barrios	18	175 cm (5 ft 9 in)	Valencia
Cojedes	Kim Gabriela Loewenthal	22	174 cm (5 ft 8 1/2 in)	Caracas
Costa Oriental	Yasmely Coromoto Pérez Martínez	23	175 cm (5 ft 9 in)	Maracaibo
Delta Amacuro	Gilger Dayana Márquez Gudiño	19	182 cm (5 ft 11 1/2 in)	Caracas
Dependencias Federales	Sabrina Salemi Nicoloso	19	173 cm (5 ft 8 in)	Caracas
Distrito Capital	Amara Elyn Barroeta Seijas	18	178 cm (5 ft 10 in)	Caracas
Falcón	Diana del Valle Cocho Bracho	18	172 cm (5 ft 7 1/2 in)	Punto Fijo
Guárico	Alejandra Pulido Aranzo	25	171 cm (5 ft 7 1/2 in)	Caracas
Lara	Karelit Coromoto Yépez Morillo	21	178 cm (5 ft 10 in)	Barquisimeto
Mérida	Maiti de Sousa do Nascimento	18	170 cm (5 ft 7 in)	Caracas
Miranda	Melissa Alexandra Wolf Ehrenzeller	21	182 cm (5 ft 11 1/2 in)	Caracas
Monagas	Enid Solsiret Herrera Ramírez	22	176 cm (5 ft 9 1/2 in)	Maturín
Nueva Esparta	Driva Ysabella Cedeño Salazar	22	180 cm (5 ft 11 in)	Porlamar
Península Goajira	Maria Virginia Bastidas Ilukewitch	23	171 cm (5 ft 7 1/2 in)	Maracaibo
Portuguesa	Maria Fernanda León Pinto	20	175 cm (5 ft 9 in)	Valencia
Sucre	Maria Carolina Casado Chópite	18	172 cm (5 ft 7 1/2 in)	Cumaná
Táchira	Ix-Balanke Tibisay Montilva Mora	17	178 cm (5 ft 10 in)	San Cristóbal
Trujillo	Anaís Verónica Gómez Carrascal	20	176 cm (5 ft 9 1/2 in)	Caracas
Vargas	Maria Andreina Abrahamz Carvallo	23	179 cm (5 ft 10 1/2 in)	Caracas
Yaracuy	Vanessa Carolina Fanessi Auteri	23	172 cm (5 ft 7 1/2 in)	Valencia
Zulia	Ana Graciela Quintero Nava	20	181 cm (5 ft 11 1/2 in)	Cabimas

Notes

- Mariangel Ruiz placed as 1st runner up in Miss Universe 2003 in Panama City, Panama.
- Goizeder Azua placed as semifinalist in Miss World 2002 in London, England. She won Miss International 2003 in Tokyo, Japan, and won Miss Mesoamérica 2003 in Houston, Texas, United States.
- Ana Quintero placed as 1st runner up in Miss Intercontinental 2003 in Berlin, Germany.
- Vanessa Fanesi placed as 1st runner up in Miss Italia Nel Mondo 2003 in Salsomaggiore, Italy. She previously won Miss Millennium 2000 in Helsinki, Finland, and placed 1st runner up in Miss Tourism World 2001 in Medellín, Colombia.
- María Carolina Casado won Miss América Latina 2003 in Playa Tambor, Puntarenas, Costa Rica.
- Karelit Yépez placed as 4th runner up in Miss Model of the World 2002 in Istanbul, Turkey.
- Maria Fernanda León (Portuguesa) had previously competed in 1999 as Miss Guarico, no placement. She later placed as finalist in Miss Teen International 2001 in Willemstad, Curaçao.
