= Miss Venezuela 2003 =

50th edition of the Miss Venezuela competition

- Date: October 16, 2003
- Presenters: Gilberto Correa; Maite Delgado; Carmen Victoria Pérez; Mariangel Ruiz
- Entertainment: Alexander Pires; Oscar D'León; Mirla Castellanos
- Venue: Venevisión Studio 1, Caracas, Venezuela
- Broadcaster: Venevision
- Entrants: 32
- Placements: 20
- Winner: Ana Karina Añez; Lara
- Congeniality: Ana Indira Sánchez; Bolívar
- Photogenic: Hilda Fleitas; Vargas

Miss Venezuela 2003 was the fiftieth Miss Venezuela pageant, held at the Venevisión Studio 1 in Caracas, Venezuela, on October 16, 2003.

Mariangel Ruiz of Aragua crowned Ana Karina Añez of Lara as her successor at the end of the event.

== Results ==
=== Placements ===
Placement	Contestant
Miss Venezuela 2003	Lara – Ana Karina Añez
Miss Venezuela World 2003	Miranda – Valentina Patruno
Miss Venezuela International 2003	Costa Oriental – Eleidy Aparicio
1st Runner-Up	Paraguaná Peninsula – Silvana Santaella
2nd Runner-Up	Distrito Capital – Mercedes Pulido
Top 10	Anzoátegui – María Fernanda Tóndolo; Aragua – Aura Avila; Dependencias Federales – Paola Cipriani; Trujillo – Francys Sudnicka; Vargas – Hilda Fleitas
Top 20	Amazonas – Rossy Rincón; Araya Peninsula – María Eugenia Hernández; Canaima – Ivana Lo Mónaco; Carabobo – Karla de Abreu; Falcón – Leonella Bracho; Monagas – Carolina Chópite; Nueva Esparta – Ingrid Mora; Sucre – Pámela Djalil; Táchira – Victoria Troconis

=== Special awards ===
- Miss Photogenic (voted by press reporters) - Hilda Fleitas (Miss Vargas)
- Miss Internet (voted by www.missvenezuela.com viewers) - Valentina Patruno (Miss Miranda)
- Miss Popularity (voted by SMS Messages) - Valentina Patruno (Miss Miranda)
- Miss Congeniality (voted by Miss Venezuela contestants) - Ana Indira Sánchez (Miss Bolívar)
- Miss Personality - Eleidy Aparicio (Miss Costa Oriental)
- Best Smile - Hilda Fleitas (Miss Vargas)
- Miss Figure - Paola Cipriani (Miss Dependencias Federales)
- Miss Elegance - Ana Karina Añez (Miss Lara)
- Best Face - Valentina Patruno (Miss Miranda)
- Best Skin - Mercedes Pulido (Miss Distrito Capital)
- Best Hair - Pamela Djalil (Miss Sucre)

== Contestants ==
The Miss Venezuela 2003 delegates are:

State	Contestant	Age	Height	Hometown
Amazonas	Rossy Raquel Rincón Rodríguez	21	175 cm (5 ft 9 in)	Barquisimeto
Anzoátegui	Maria Fernanda Tóndolo Paz	18	182 cm (5 ft 11 1/2 in)	Valencia
Apure	Marinely Auxiliadora Rivas Torres	21	181 cm (5 ft 11 1/2 in)	Mérida
Aragua	Aura Rebeca Avila Serrano	18	178 cm (5 ft 10 in)	Maracay
Barinas	Venudesa María Lionza Pacé Salazar	20	173 cm (5 ft 8 in)	Valencia
Bolívar	Ana Indira Sánchez Báez	21	173 cm (5 ft 8 in)	Ciudad Guayana
Canaima	Ivana Erika Lo Mónaco D´Anna	21	177 cm (5 ft 9 1/2 in)	Caracas
Carabobo	Karla Jennifer De Abreu De Abreu	24	176 cm (5 ft 9 1/2 in)	El Hatillo
Cojedes	Alba María Arias Acevedo	24	174 cm (5 ft 8 1/2 in)	Caracas
Costa Oriental	Eleidy María Aparicio Serrano	20	176 cm (5 ft 9 1/2 in)	Cabimas
Delta Amacuro	Eglee Cañizalez Perdomo	22	177 cm (5 ft 9 1/2 in)	Trujillo
Dependencias Federales	Paola Sofía Cipriani Huszczo	23	179 cm (5 ft 10 1/2 in)	Caracas
Distrito Capital	Mercedes Alejandra Pulido Silva	20	174 cm (5 ft 8 1/2 in)	El Hatillo
Falcón	Leonella Mercedes Bracho Coll	18	179 cm (5 ft 10 1/2 in)	Barquisimeto
Guárico	Marjorie Andrea Olivares Martínez	22	175 cm (5 ft 9 in)	Caracas
Guayana Esequiba	Diana Carolina Díaz Pérez	19	176 cm (5 ft 9 1/2 in)	Caracas
Lara	Ana Karina Añez Delgado	18	180 cm (5 ft 11 in)	Barquisimeto
Mérida	Ana Karina Ramírez Vallenilla	22	181 cm (5 ft 11 1/2 in)	Mérida
Miranda	Valentina Patruno Macero	21	172 cm (5 ft 7 1/2 in)	Caracas
Monagas	Joan Carolina Chópite Sute	23	178 cm (5 ft 10 in)	Maturín
Nueva Esparta	Ingrid Alejandra Mora Wandelt	19	174 cm (5 ft 8 1/2 in)	Porlamar
Península de Araya	María Eugenia Hernández Ereu	22	172 cm (5 ft 7 1/2 in)	Maracay
Península Goajira	Julimar Coromoto Queipo Silva	20	175 cm (5 ft 9 in)	Maracaibo
Península de Paraguaná	Silvana Santaella Arellano	19	174 cm (5 ft 8 1/2 in)	Caracas
Portuguesa	Maria Valentina González González	19	179 cm (5 ft 10 1/2 in)	Barquisimeto
Roraima	Yanneris Pilar Carrizo Soto	21	173 cm (5 ft 8 in)	Cabimas
Sucre	Pamela Fátima Djalil Salazar	19	177 cm (5 ft 9 1/2 in)	Cumaná
Táchira	Victoria Isabella Troconis Alcalde	18	178 cm (5 ft 10 in)	San Cristóbal
Trujillo	Francys Mayela Barraza Sudnicka	23	174 cm (5 ft 8 1/2 in)	Valencia
Vargas	Hilda Socorro Fleitas Espinoza	22	172 cm (5 ft 7 1/2 in)	Valencia
Yaracuy	Tania Jazmín Destongue Quiroz	24	175 cm (5 ft 9 in)	Barquisimeto
Zulia	Joana Carolina Cufiño Estrada	19	175 cm (5 ft 9 in)	Maracaibo

Notes

- Valentina Patruno placed as semifinalist in Miss World 2003 in Sanya, China. She previously won Miss Italia Nel Mondo 2001 in Salsomaggiore, Italy.
- Eleidy Aparicio placed as finalist in World Coffee Queen 2004 in Houston, Texas, United States.
- Silvana Santaella won Miss Italia Nel Mondo 2004 in Salsomaggiore, Italy. She also placed as 2nd runner up in Reinado Internacional del Café 2004 in Manizales, Colombia, and 2nd runner up in Miss Earth 2007 in Quezon City, Philippines.
- María Fernanda Tóndolo placed as 1st runner up in Reina Sudamericana 2003 in Santa Cruz, Bolivia.
- Paola Cipriani placed as 3rd runner up in Reina Internacional de la Caña de Azúcar 2003 in Cali, Colombia.
- Ana Indira Sánchez won Miss Mash Queen International 2004 in Georgetown, Guyana. She also placed as 1st runner up in Miss Mundo Latino Internacional 2004 in Toronto, Ontario, Canada.
- Marinely Rivas placed as semifinalist in Miss Bikini International 2006 in Humen, China.
- Tania Destongue placed as semifinalist in Miss Tourism International 2003 in Kuala Lumpur, Malaysia.
- Carolina Chópite previously won Miss Globe International 2000 in Kyrenia, Northern Cyprus.
- Ingrid Mora previously placed as semifinalist in Miss Teen International 2002 in San José, Costa Rica.
- Francys Barraza Sudnicka won Miss Tourism World 2000 in St. Paul's Bay, Malta. She also won Miss Poland 2005, represented the country in Miss Universe 2006 in Los Angeles, California, United States and placed Top 8 in Miss Earth 2006 in Manila, Philippines.
