= Miss Venezuela 1981 =

28th edition of the Miss Venezuela competition

- Date: May 7, 1981
- Presenters: Gilberto Correa; Carmen Victoria Pérez; María Antonieta Cámpoli
- Venue: Macuto Sheraton Hotel, Caraballeda, Vargas state
- Broadcaster: Venevision
- Entrants: 19
- Placements: 7
- Winner: Irene Sáez; Miranda

Miss Venezuela 1981 was the 28th Miss Venezuela pageant, was held in Caraballeda, Vargas state, Venezuela, on May 7, 1981, after weeks of events. The winner of the pageant was Irene Sáez, Miss Miranda.

The pageant was broadcast live on Venevision from the Macuto Sheraton Hotel in Caraballeda, Vargas state. At the conclusion of the final night of competition, outgoing titleholder Maye Brandt, crowned Irene Sáez of Miranda as the new Miss Venezuela.

Sáez, and Pilin León, that year's first runner-up, would later go on to become Miss Universe 1981 and Miss World 1981, respectively, marking the first time ever for Venezuela to win both major international beauty pageants in the same year.

== Results ==
=== Placements ===
Final Results	Delegate	International Placement
Miss Venezuela 1981	Miranda — Irene Sáez	Winner — Miss Universe 1981
1st Runner-Up	Aragua — Pilín León	Winner — Miss World 1981
2nd Runner-Up	(Caracas) Distrito Federal — Miriam Quintana	
3rd Runner-Up	Apure — Norys Silva	
4th Runner-Up	Zulia — Ana Verónica Muñoz	
5th Runner-Up	Vargas — Irama Muñoz	
6th Runner-Up	Bolívar — Miúrica Yánez	

=== Special awards ===
- Miss Photogenic (voted by press reporters) - Irene Sáez (Miss Miranda)
- Miss Congeniality - Maricel Aizpúrua (Miss Amazonas)
- Miss Elegance - Miúrica Yánez (Miss Bolívar)
- Miss Amity - Miúrica Yánez (Miss Bolívar)

== Contestants ==
The Miss Venezuela 1981 delegates are:

- Miss Amazonas - Maricel Aizpúrua Laguna
- Miss Apure - Norys Cristina Silva Correa
- Miss Aragua - Carmen Josefina (Pilin) León Crespo
- Miss Barinas - Mariela Pérez Rodríguez
- Miss Bolívar - Miúrica Yánez Callender
- Miss Carabobo - Diana Mercedes Iturriza Rondón
- Miss Departamento Vargas - Irama Muñoz Silva
- Miss Distrito Federal - Miriam Sagrario Quintana Quintana
- Miss Falcón - Leonor Fernández Páez
- Miss Guárico - Rosana Mangieri Carmeniu †
- Miss Lara - Ursula Elena Remien Schuchard
- Miss Mérida - Marle Yajaira Broccolo Castro
- Miss Miranda - Irene Lailín Sáez Conde
- Miss Monagas - Yesenia Maurera
- Miss Portuguesa - Olga Martínez
- Miss Sucre - Zulay Lorenzo
- Miss Táchira - Dulce Leonor Porras
- Miss Trujillo - Hodalys Pavía †
- Miss Zulia - Ana Verónica Muñoz Blum
