= Miss World 1981 =

International beauty pageant

- Miss World 1981 Titlecard
- Date: 12 November 1981
- Presenters: Peter Marshall; Judith Chalmers
- Entertainment: Helen Reddy
- Venue: Royal Albert Hall, London, United Kingdom
- Broadcaster: Thames Television
- Entrants: 67
- Placements: 15
- Withdrawals: Mauritius; Panama; Paraguay; Swaziland; United States Virgin Islands
- Returns: Chile; El Salvador; French Polynesia; Iceland; Suriname
- Winner: Pilín León; Venezuela

Miss World 1981, the 31st edition of the Miss World pageant, was held on 12 November 1981 at the Royal Albert Hall in London, United Kingdom.

The winner was Pilín León from Venezuela, the first titleholder from her country since 1955. She was crowned by Miss World 1980, Kimberley Santos from Guam. Another Venezuelan, Irene Sáez, had been crowned Miss Universe 1981 in July, making Venezuela one of the few countries to hold both major international titles (Miss Universe and Miss World) in the same year. The Continental Queens of Beauty were awarded for the first time.

This edition marked the return of Suriname, which last competed in 1966 and Chile, El Salvador, French Polynesia (as Tahiti), Iceland last competed in 1979. Mauritius, Panama, Paraguay, Swaziland, the United States Virgin Islands withdrew from the competition for unknown reasons.

== Results ==
=== Placements ===
Placement	Contestant
Miss World 1981	Venezuela – Pilin León
1st Runner-Up	Colombia – Nini Soto
2nd Runner-Up	Jamaica – Sandra Cunningham
Top 7	Australia – Melissa Hannan; Brazil – Maristela Grazzia; United Kingdom – Michele Donnelly; United States – Lisa Moss
Top 15	Argentina – Helen Natali; Belgium – Dominique van Eeckhoudt; Canada – Earla Stewart; Ireland – Geraldine McGrory; Japan – Naomi Kishi; Mexico – Dora Pontvianne; Trinidad and Tobago – Rachael Ann Thomas; Zimbabwe – Juliet Nyathi

=== Special awards ===
Award	Winner
Miss Photogenic	Australia – Melissa Hannan
Miss Personality	Mexico – Dora Pontvianne

== Contestants ==
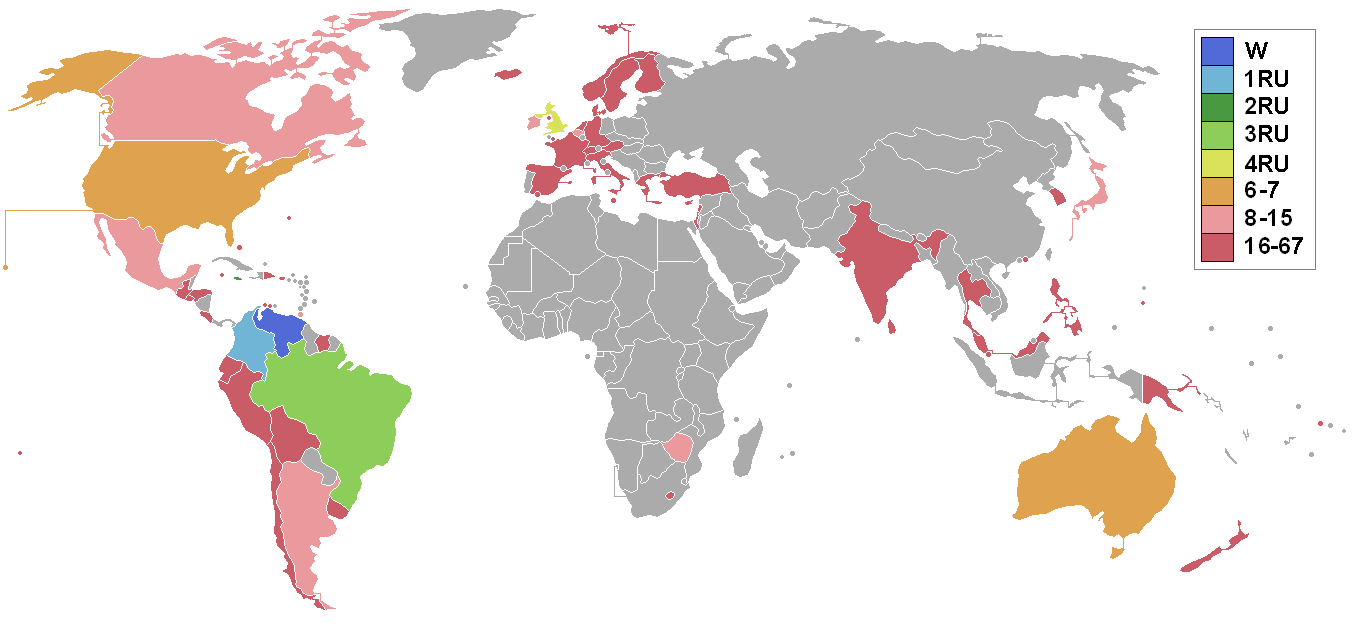
Countries and territories which sent delegates and results for Miss World 1981

67 contestants competed for the title.

Country/Territory	Contestant	Age (Note: Ages at the time of the pageant)	Hometown
Argentina	Helen Natali	21	Villa María
Aruba	Gerarda Roepel	24	Oranjestad
Australia	Melissa Hannan	19	Mosman
Austria	Beatrix Kopf	21	Lustenau
(The Bahamas) Bahamas	Monique Ferguson	18	Nassau
Belgium	Dominique van Eeckhoudt	19	Waterloo
Bermuda	Cymone Tucker	21	Smith's Parish
Bolivia	Carolina Díaz	17	Pando
Brazil	Maristela Grazzia	17	São Paulo
Canada	Earla Stewart	22	Pembroke
Cayman Islands	Donna Marie Myrie	20	George Town
Chile	Susanna Bravo	19	Santiago
Colombia	Nini Johanna Soto	18	Bucaramanga
Costa Rica	Sucetty Salas	18	San José
Curaçao	Mylene Gerard	21	Willemstad
Cyprus	Elena Andreou	19	Nicosia
Denmark	Tina Brandstrup	21	Copenhagen
Dominican Republic	Josefina Cuello	24	Santo Domingo
Ecuador	Lucía Vinueza	19	Guayaquil
El Salvador	Martha Alicia Ortíz	19	San Salvador
Finland	Pia Nieminen	20	Tampere
France	Isabelle Benard	19	Vernon
French Polynesia (Note: Competed as Tahiti in the pageant)	Maimiti Kinnander	20	Huahine
Gibraltar	Yvette Maria Bellido	18	Gibraltar
Greece	Maria Argyrokastritou	22	Athens
Guam	Rebecca Arroyo	21	Mangilao
Guatemala	Beatriz Bojorquez	23	Guatemala City
(Netherlands) Holland	Saskia Lemmers	23	Amsterdam
Honduras	Xiomara Sikaffy	20	San Pedro Sula
(British Hong Kong) Hong Kong	Winnie Chin	18	Hong Kong Island
Iceland	Ásdís Hannesdóttir	23	Reykjavík
India	Deepti Divakar	22	Bengaluru
(Republic of Ireland) Ireland	Geraldine McGrory	22	Derry
Isle of Man	Nicola-Jane Grainger	18	Dalby
Israel	Ninnette Assor	22	Tel Aviv
Italy	Marisa Tutone	17	Turin
Jamaica	Sandra Cunningham	24	Kingston
Japan	Naomi Kishi	18	Kawasaki
Jersey	Elizabeth Walmsley	18	Saint Helier
Lebanon	Zeina Challita	19	Beirut
Lesotho	Palesa Joyce Kalele	18	Maseru
Malaysia	Cynthia de Castro	20	Malacca
Malta	Elizabeth-Mary Fenech	19	Żebbuġ
Mexico	Doris Pontvianne	18	Tampico
New Zealand	Raewyn Marcroft	18	Hamilton
Norway	Anita Nesbø	20	Akershus
Papua New Guinea	Jennifer Abaijah	19	Port Moresby
Peru	Olga Zumarán	22	Lima
Philippines	Suzette Nicolas	24	Manila
Puerto Rico	Andrenira Ruíz	19	San Juan
Singapore	Sushil Kaur Sandhu	20	Singapore
South Korea (Note: Competed as Korea in the pageant)	Lee Han-na	19	Seoul
Spain	Cristina Pérez Cottrell	18	Málaga
Sri Lanka	Sonya Elizabeth Tucker	20	Colombo
Suriname	Joan Boldewijn	18	Paramaribo
Sweden	Carita Gustafsson	20	Gothenburg
Switzerland	Margrit Kilchoer	22	Geneva
Thailand	Massupha Karbprapun	21	Bangkok
Trinidad and Tobago	Rachael Thomas	21	Diego Martin
Turkey	Aydan Şener	18	Kilis
United Kingdom	Michele Donnelly	20	Cardiff
United States	Lisa Moss	23	Shreveport
Uruguay	Marianela Bas	23	Montevideo
Venezuela	Pilin León	18	Maracay
West Germany	Barbara Reimund	18	Stuttgart
Western Samoa	Julianna Curry	17	Apia
Zimbabwe	Juliet Nyathi	24	Bulawayo
