= Tabiano Castle =

Castle in Salsomaggiore Terme

- Castello di Tabiano
- Italy
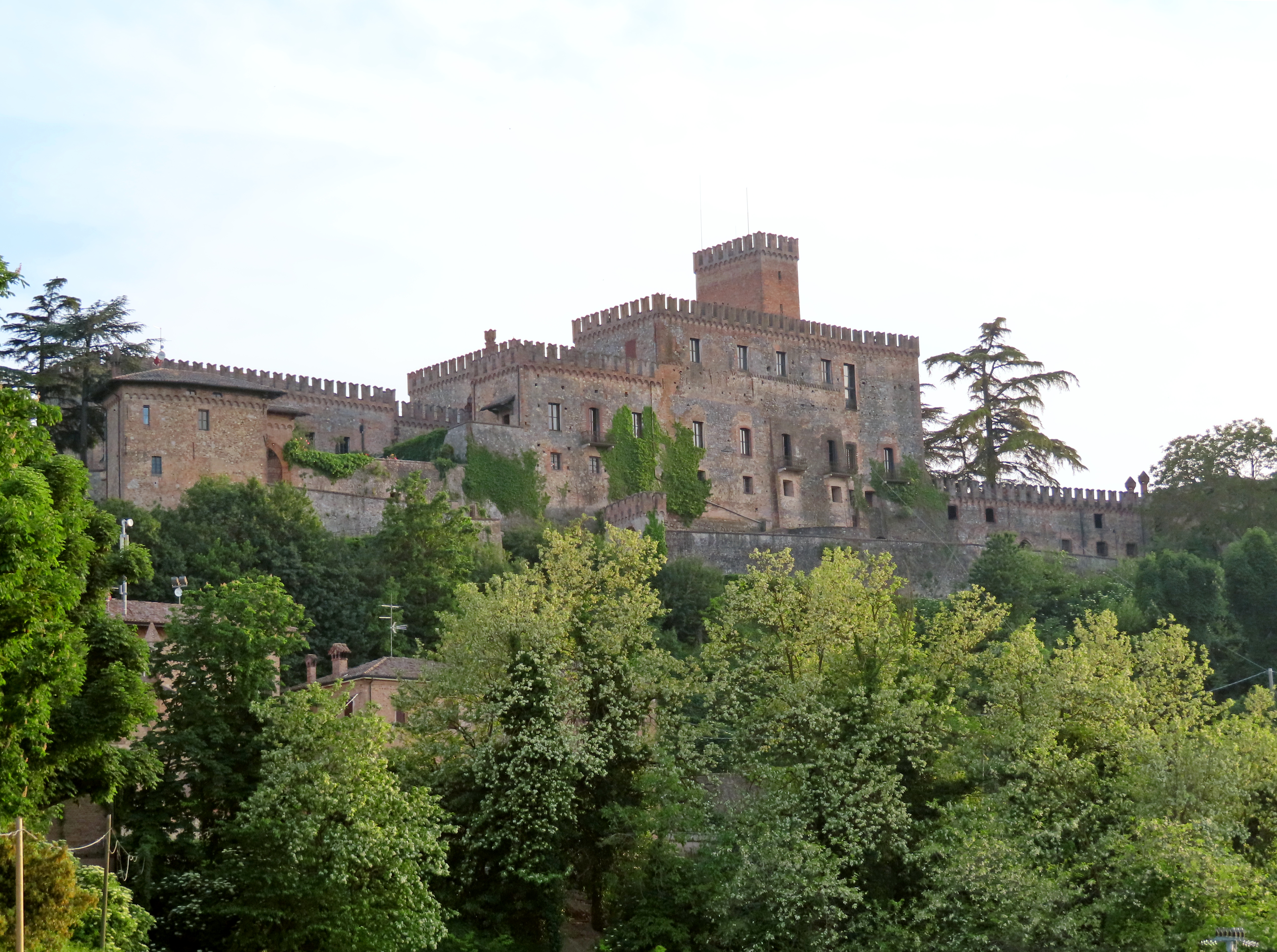
- North facade

Site information
- Type: Castle
- Open to the public: Yes
- Condition: Restored
- Website: https://www.tabianocastello.com/

Location
- Tabiano Castle
- Coordinates: 44°47′33.9″N 10°01′22.98″E

Site history
- Built for: Defense of the Rovacchia valley
- Built by: Pallavicino family
- Materials: Stone

Tabiano Castle (Italian: Castello di Tabiano) is a medieval manor house in the small district of Tabiano Castello, belonging to the municipality of Salsomaggiore Terme, in the province of Parma.

== History ==
The original castle was probably built by the Pallavicino family between the 10th and 11th centuries, on the remains of a Roman-era settlement; however, there is no certain information on the birth of the fortress, which some historians say dates instead to the early 12th century.

In 1143, Marquis Oberto I Pallavicino divided his numerous properties among his sons, triggering a long dispute that also involved the manor of Tabiano, which fell to his son Delfino. In 1149, the fortification was attacked by his brother Guglielmo and the people of Piacenza, who were initially defeated thanks to the help of the people of Parma and Cremona. However, in the following year, the Piacenza people managed to conquer, sack and destroy the castle. In 1153, it was rebuilt and Delfino was officially endowed with the title of marquis; peace between the two brothers was sanctioned in 1158 by Frederick Barbarossa at the Diet of Roncaglia.

In 1180, Delfino Pallavicino died without heirs, leaving the fortress to the canons of the Parma Cathedral Chapter, which a few years later ceded three-quarters of it to Bernardo da Cornazzano. In 1249 the castle reentered the Pallavicino possessions when the Holy Roman Emperor Frederick II of Swabia officially awarded it to Marquis Oberto II Pallavicino, who in 1267 was again forced to surrender it due to an assault by the Guelphs of Parma.

In the early 14th century, Manfredino Pallavicino, son of Oberto II, managed to regain possession of the manor with the help of the Visconti family of Milan, but he left it to his cousins from the Scipione branch, who in turn passed it on to the Busseto lineage. In 1374, however, Bernabò Visconti, taking advantage of the conspiracy that Niccolò Pallavicino hatched behind the back of his uncle Giacomo, marquis of Bargone, attacked the fortress and took possession of it, giving it in 1380 to his consort Regina della Scala. In 1390, Gian Galeazzo Visconti handed the castle back to Niccolò, who, however, died by poisoning in 1401, leaving all his wealth to his son Rolando the Magnificent. According to a local legend, Niccolò's death was due to the apparition of his uncle Giacomo's ghost, while in reality his poisoning was organized by another branch of the family to prevent the inheritance from passing to Rolando.

In 1441, Niccolò Piccinino attacked the Pallavicino State on several fronts, forcing the Pallavicino to flee. All his lands were forfeited by Filippo Maria Visconti, who in 1442 invested the condottiero with the fiefdom of Tabiano and several others in the Parma area.

However, in 1457, Uberto Pallavicino, Rolando's son, was officially given the estate by Francesco Sforza; the branch of which he was progenitor maintained possession of the castle for about three centuries, which suffered its last assault in 1636, during the Thirty Years' War, by the Spanish, who were, however, repelled.

In 1756, the direct lineage of the Pallavicino family of Tabiano died out with Odoardo, and the feud was confiscated by the ducal chamber of Parma, which assigned it to the Sermattei family of Assisi. However, the lands remained in the hands of the heirs of the collateral branches and in particular of the marchioness Ottavia Pallavicino, who married Francesco Maria Landi. The couple also repurchased the castle, which they passed on to their son Gian Battista and their nephew Ferdinando; the latter was succeeded by his sister Sofia, wife of Count Ferdinando Douglas Scotti of San Giorgio.

In 1882, Sofia alienated the over 200 hectares of land, the dilapidated fortress, and the ancient surrounding village to give them to Giacomo and Rosa Corazza, who ran an industry in London; the couple in the following years initiated major decoration and restoration work on the manor house.

Their son Carlo, already a co-owner of Terme Berzieri, acquired new land and renovated the farmhouses in the early 20th century, founding a thriving rural enterprise, equipped with stables, barns, cottages, two dairies, and cheese warehouses.

His descendants in the early 21st century recovered the entire structure of the castle and the small medieval village, which they transformed into an inn, while also keeping the adjacent farm in business.

== Description ==
The large and complex castle, the result of successive modifications and extensions over the centuries, is built on an almost rectangular plan, on the steep ridge of the hills near Salsomaggiore Terme; its imposing bulk rises up on the rock, emerging from the surrounding valleys at the edge of the forest. In the center rises the main body of the manor, inside which stands the tall square-shaped watchtower.

The facades of the various buildings that make up the castle are almost entirely made out of stone and crowned with Ghibelline merlons, which also characterize the ancient entrance tower. The same tower is characterized by two tall slits that once housed the crossbows of the drawbridge, later replaced by a small wooden bridge; at the edges is the oldest part of the village, within the thirteenth-century walls at whose corners rise two angular towers with a circular plan. The complex structure of the manor is softened by the numerous terraces and the 12th-century ramparts, which have been transformed into gardens.

In the interiors, numerous rooms are enriched by fresco and stucco decorations, made mainly in the second half of the 19th century when the castle was restored.

=== Tour route ===
The castle has been open to the public since 2016 and is part of the circuit of castles of the Association of Castles of the Duchy of Parma, Piacenza and Pontremoli.

The ancient vaulted cellars, the halls decorated with stucco and frescoes, the ballroom, the hall of coats of arms, the library, the private chapel, the grand staircase, the terraces, the gardens, and the Red Door can be visited.

== See also ==
- Pallavicini family
- Niccolò Piccinino
- Landi family
- Castle of Calendasco.
- Castles of the Duchy

== Bibliography ==
- Pezzana, Angelo (1842). Storia della città di Parma continuata [Continued History of the city of Parma] (in Italian). Parma: Ducale Tipografia.
- Mancuso, Roberto (2020). Fantasmi, tesori e leggende emiliane [Ghosts, treasures and legends from Emilia-Romagna] (in Italian). Youcanprint. ISBN 9791220309127.
