= Dina Barberini =

Italian operatic soprano

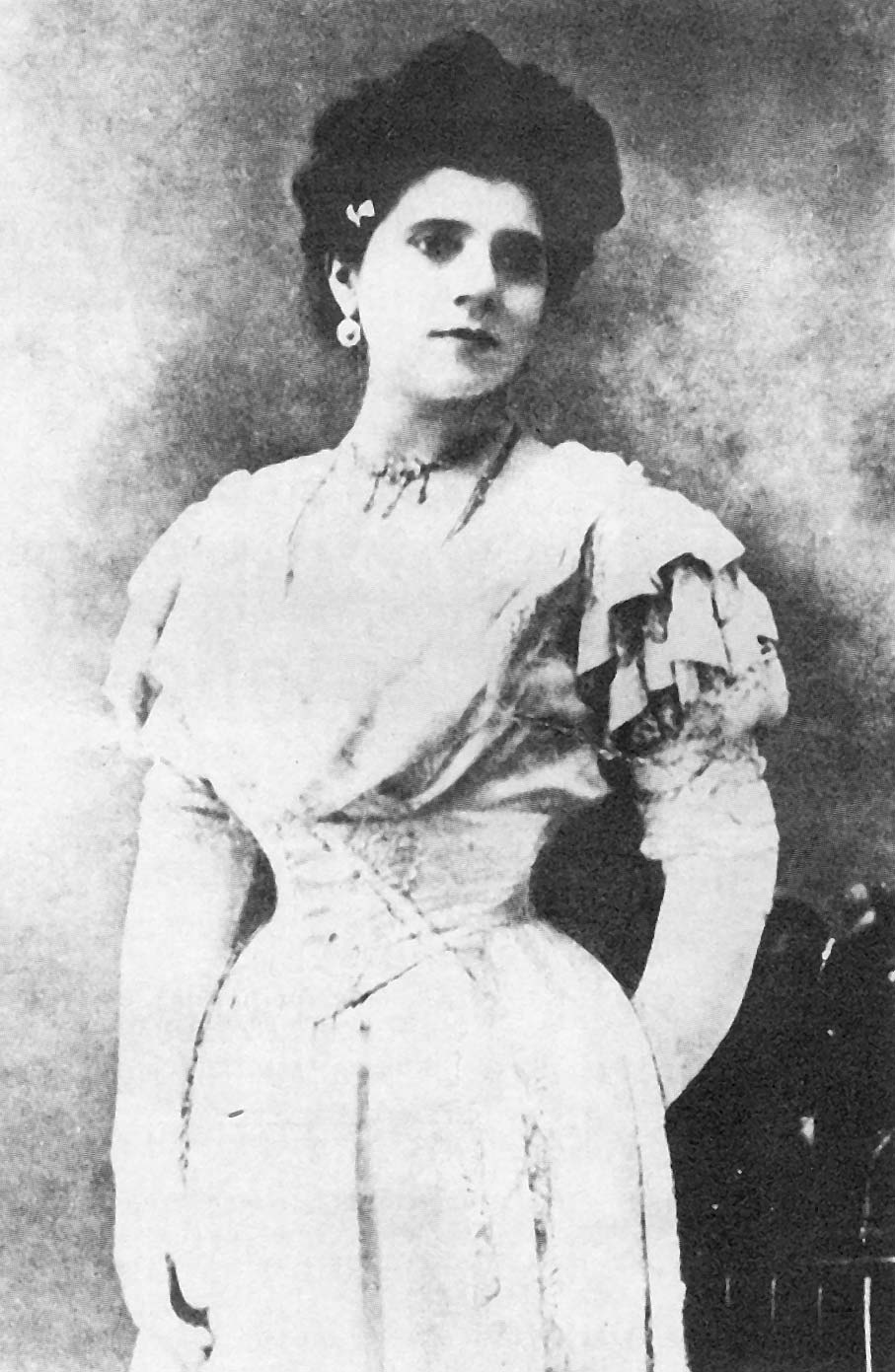
- Born: Dina Barberini; March 17, 1862; Tabiano Terme, Kingdom of Italy
- Died: December 26, 1932 (aged 70)
- Occupation: Opera singer

Dina Barberini (17 March 1862 – 26 December 1932) was an Italian operatic soprano who had an active international career from the 1880s into the early part of the 20th century. She later embarked on a second career as a voice teacher.

== Career ==
Barberini was advised by Giuseppe Verdi to pursue an opera career after he heard her sing while visiting her home town of Tabiano Terme. She then entered the Milan Conservatory where she studied singing with Teresa Brambilla. She made her debut as Marguerite in Charles Gounod's Faust. Among the theatres she appeared at were La Scala, the Bolshoi Theatre, the Liceu, the Mariinsky Theatre, the Prague National Theatre, the Royal Opera House, Valletta, the São João National Theatre, the Teatro Carlo Felice, the Teatro Costanzi, the Teatro Nacional de São Carlos, the Teatro Real, the Teatro Regio di Torino, and the Theater an der Wien. At the behest of Gustav Mahler she performed at the Odessa Opera. One of the highlights of her career was singing Margherita in Arrigo Boito's Mefistofele under the baton of Arturo Toscanini. She sang opposite tenor Francesco Tamagno in several productions. After giving her farewell opera performance at the Opéra de Monte-Carlo, she taught singing out of her home in Milan. She died there in 1932 at the age of 70.
