= Judith Grace =

Mexican television personality

Judith Grace González Hincks (born September 7, 1962 in Monterrey Nuevo León, México) is a Mexican actress and beauty pageant titleholder who was crowned Señorita México 1981 and then She competed in the Miss Universe 1981 pageant.

== Biography ==
Born on September 7, 1962 in Monterrey, Mexico. she was the first contestant from the state of Nuevo León to win the Miss Mexico pageant, which then opened the doors for her in local television. She first started off being the host of a TV show on Televisa in Monterrey, México, "Estilo". The show lasted for about 14 years. After that, in Mexico City she was the host of "Al ritmo de la noche" along with Jorge Ortiz de Pinedo and some other acting gigs on Mexican telenovelas, like Marisol for Televisa. She then became the director of the state television network "Canal 28" and changed the name of the network to "TV NL", she was recognized by the governor for being able to get federal aid to improve the network's condition.

In 1997, she ran for mayor of the city of Monterrey on the Labor Party (Partido Trabajo) ticket, and in 2000 she was the Alliance for Mexico candidate for senator from the state of Nuevo León, she broke a record for the numbers of votes that she got on her favor, even more so than the candidate of the same party running for president.

She was the host of Casos de Familia for ten years (which translates literally as "Family Cases"), a talk show produced in the United States by Venevisión, and broadcast in the U.S. on the Univision Network since 2004. As of July 2012, Judith Grace finished her contract and moved to different projects, among them, being the latinamerican face for the Obama Care campaign from the healthcare department during president Obama's presidency. The show "Casos de Familia" continued with a different hostess.

Judith recently participated in Top Chef Estrellas, earning her the second place in the competition. She is now offering conferences around Latin American countries.
