= San Nicomede, Salsomaggiore =

Rural Roman Catholic parish church

San Nicomede is a Romanesque and Gothic-style, Roman Catholic rural parish church located in the frazione of the same name, in Salsomaggiore, province of Parma, region of Emilia Romagna, Italy.

== History ==
By 870, a church was located at a rural site. The site held a well, still in the crypt, that supposedly was granted healing powers by the saint. The church was previously known as the church of the Fontana Broccola due to this fountain. In 876, the local bishop Vibodo transferred the supposed relics of San Nicomede, martyr of Domitian's persecutions.

The structure we see today was constructed over a number of centuries. The crypt dates to its origins, while the apse and nave date to the 14th century. The church was rebuilt in a Lombard-Gothic revival architecture style in 1909. The belltower and façade with rose window and roofline spires was added then. Some of the elements of the crypt are ancient Roman spolia. Its status as a parish church diminished when another church was inaugurated in 1933 in the frazione of Ponteghiara; a formal transfer was completed in 1965.
