= Valentina Patruno =

Venezuelan model (born 1982)

- Born: September 6, 1982 (age 44)
- Height: 1.72 m (5 ft 7 1/2 in)
- Beauty pageant titleholder
- Title: Miss Italia nel Mondo 2001; Miss Miranda 2003; Miss Venezuela World 2003
- Hair color: Brown
- Eye color: Brown
- Major competitions: Miss Venezuela 2003 (Miss Venezuela World 2003); Miss World 2003 (Top 20)

Valentina Patruno (born September 6, 1982) is a Venezuelan model and beauty pageant titleholder. She was the official representative of Venezuela to the Miss World 2003 pageant held in Sanya, China on December 6, 2003, where she placed in the top 20.

Awards and achievements
Preceded by (Carabobo) Goizeder Azúa	Miss World Venezuela; 2003	Succeeded by (Trujillo (state)) Andrea Milroy
