= Eleidy Aparicio =

Venezuelan model and actress

- Born: Eleidy María Aparicio Serrano; September 9, 1983; Cabimas, Zulia, Venezuela
- Height: 1.76 m (5 ft 9 in)
- Beauty pageant titleholder
- Title: Miss Venezuela International 2003
- Hair color: Brown
- Eye color: Brown
- Major competitions: Miss Venezuela 2003 (Miss Venezuela International 2003); Miss International 2004 (Unplaced)

Eleidy María Aparicio Serrano is a Venezuelan actress, model, and former beauty pageant titleholder. She is best known for her role playing coroner África Porras in the television series La viuda joven. She was crowned Miss Venezuela International 2003 and was the official representative of Venezuela at the Miss International 2004 pageant held in Beijing, China, on October 16, 2004.

Aparicio also represented her country in the World Coffee Queen 2004 beauty pageant, held in Houston, Texas, United States, on July 31, 2004, when she classified in the Top 6 finalists.

Aparicio competed in the national beauty pageant Miss Venezuela 2003 and obtained the title of Miss Venezuela International. She represented Costa Oriental.

Awards and achievements
Preceded by Goizeder Azua (Carabobo)	Miss Venezuela International; 2004	Succeeded by Andrea Gómez (Caracas)
