= Francys Sudnicka =

Polish-Venezuelan model (born 1979)

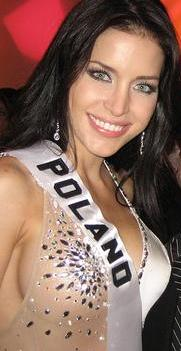
- Francys Sudnicka
- Born: Francys Sudnicka; 9 December 1979 (age 46); Valencia, Venezuela
- Height: 5 ft 8.5 in (1.74 m)
- Beauty pageant titleholder
- Title: Miss Universe Poland 2006; Miss Earth Poland 2006
- Hair color: Brown
- Eye color: Green
- Major competitions: Miss Venezuela 2003 (Top 10); Miss Polonia 2005 (1st Runner-Up); Miss Universe 2006 (Unplaced); Miss Earth 2006 (Top 8)

Francys Sudnicka (born 9 December 1979 in Valencia, Venezuela) is a Polish-Venezuelan model and beauty pageant titleholder.

She was born in the city of Valencia, Venezuela and lived in Poland until her adolescence. She then moved back to Venezuela to pursue pageantry, before returning for good to Poland.

She is noted for being the second former contestant of the Miss Venezuela pageant (after Natascha Börger) to win the right to represent another country at the Miss Universe pageant.

== Early life ==
Francys Mayela Sudnicka was born on 9 December 1979 in Valencia, Venezuela. Through her family's Polish ancestry, Sudnicka's parents were able to move to Poland with her when she was 2 years old. Sudnicka went to school in Poland and lived there until adolescence. Despite this, she never lost Venezuelan citizenship and was therefore able to represent Venezuela at beauty pageants. For this purpose, Sudnicka temporarily returned to Venezuela in 2002.

== Miss Venezuela 2003 ==
In 2003, Sudnicka was named a semifinalist in the Miss Centroccidental preliminary, one of the largest selections of candidates for Venezuela's powerful national pageant. The judges gave away the titles of six states but did not select Sudnicka. However, the president of the Miss Venezuela pageant, overruled them and ordered that Sudnicka be sent to Caracas to prepare for the Miss Venezuela 2003 pageant. Sudnicka was appointed as the representative of the state of Trujillo, placing in the top ten.

== Miss Polonia 2005 ==
Sudnicka represented the Polish community in Venezuela in the 2005 Miss Polonia contest. The winner of the contest was appointed to Miss World while Sudnicka, a Runner-up, was appointed as Poland's Miss Universe representative.

== Miss Universe 2006 ==
In December 2005, Sudnicka was preparing for the Miss Universe 2006 title, following Natascha Börger as the second alumna of the Miss Venezuela pageant to seize a foreign crown after an unsuccessful participation in the Miss Venezuela preliminary. Since Börger was highly successful representing Germany in international pageants, Sudnicka was a clear favourite to become at least a runner-up at Miss Universe, but she unplaced.

== Miss Earth 2006 ==
After moving back to Poland, Sudnicka also competed in the Miss Earth 2006 pageant in Manila, Philippines against 81 other women as Miss Earth Poland. She placed in the Top 8.

== Dancing with the Stars ==
In 2009, she took part in the 9th edition of the Polish version of "Dancing with the Stars". She was partnered with professional dancer and choreographer Łukasz Czarnecki. Sudnicka was voted off in the 5th week, finishing in 8th place.

== Personal life ==
Sudnicka holds both, Polish and Venezuelan citizenship. She is fluent in Polish, Spanish and English.

After meeting Polish professional dancer and choreographer Łukasz Czarnecki at Dancing with the Stars, she began a relationship with him.

In 2011, the couple's daughter, Francine, was born. They live in Gdańsk.
