= Palazzo delle Terme Berzieri =

1921 thermal baths in Salsomaggiore, Italy

Coordinates: 44.81593°N 9.97928°E

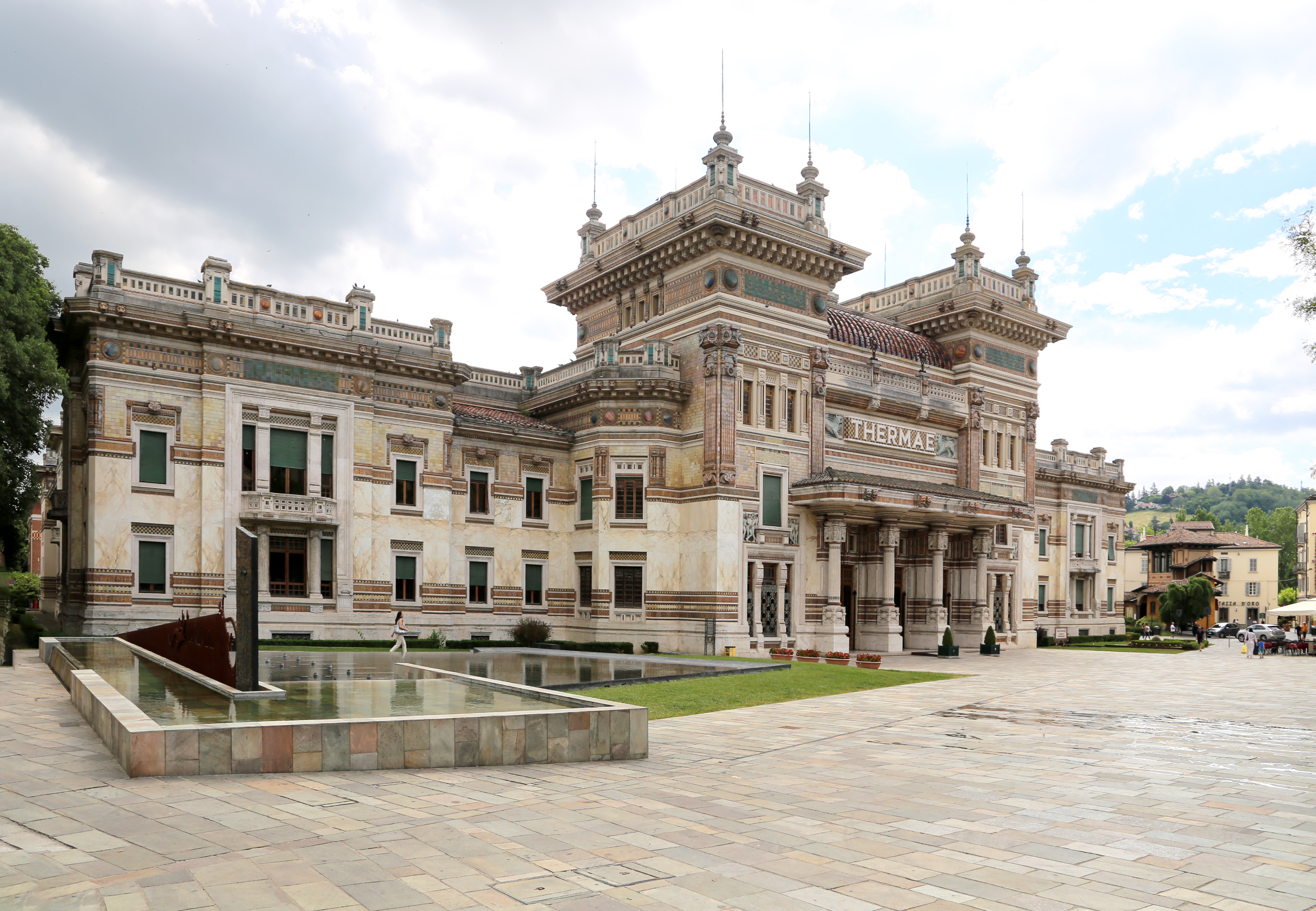
Facade of the Terme Berzieri

The Palazzo delle Terme Berzieri, also called Terme Berzieri, is a prominent building in central Salsomaggiore, located in the Province of Parma, Italy. The eclectic building, completed in 1921, and combining Liberty style and oriental elements, houses thermal baths.

== History ==
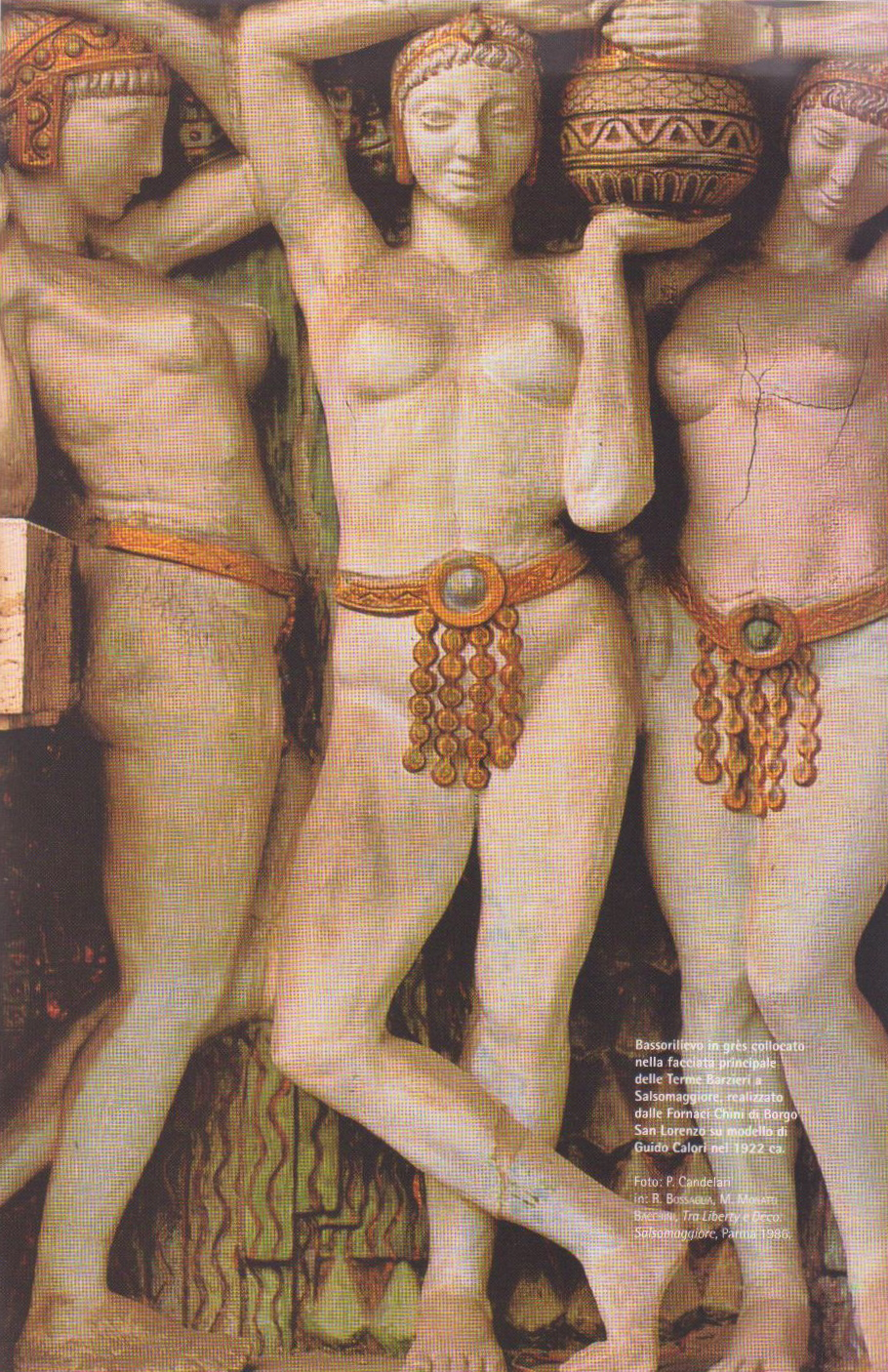
External frieze of water-carriers

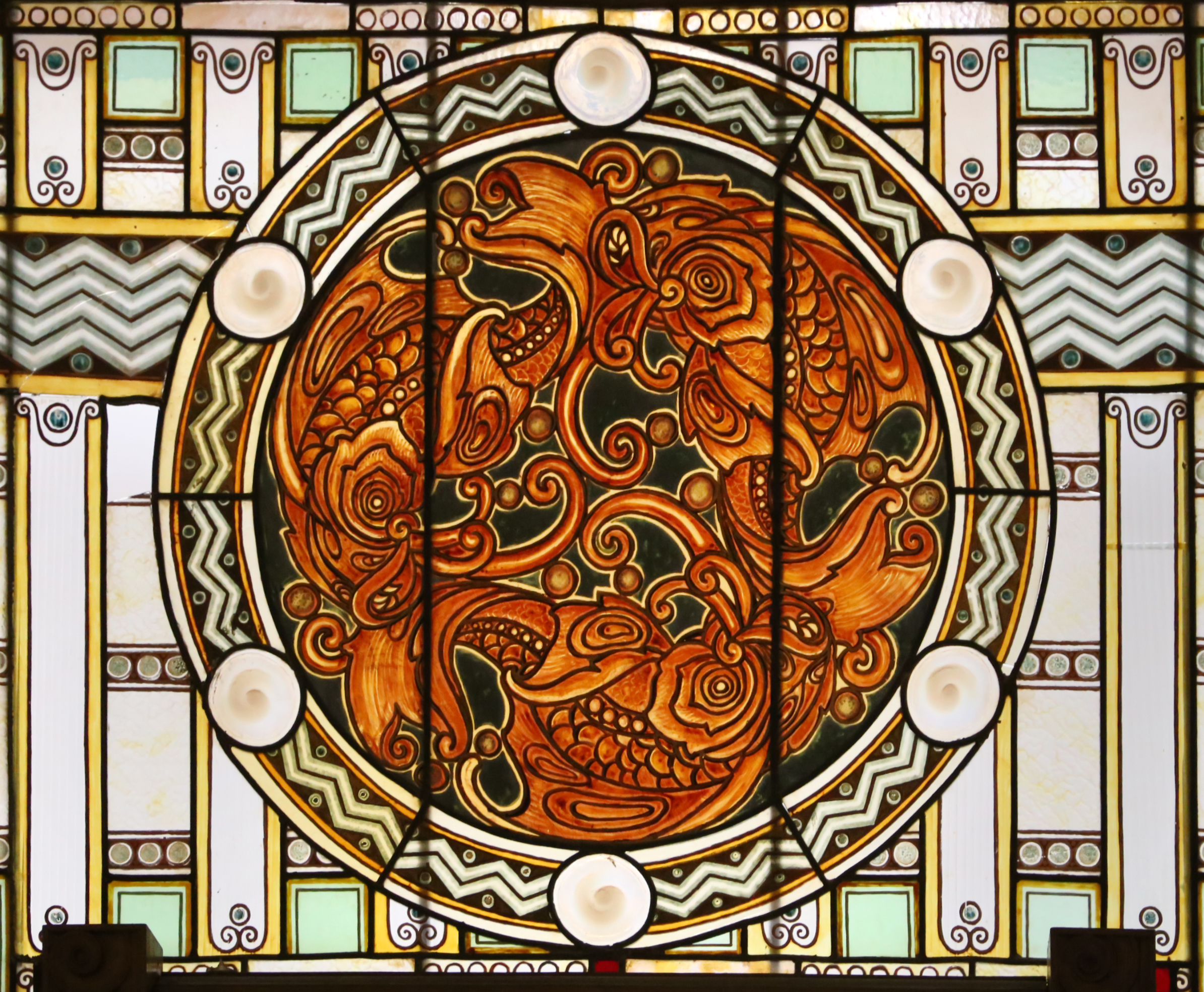
Round stain-glass windows with stylized design of goldfish

In the 19th century, the thermal waters of Salsomaggiore became touted as restorative or curative of various ailments. The Parmesan physician Lorenzo Berzieri promoted his studies of therapeutic properties on the salsobromoiodic waters of this area; publishing in the 1840s case reports about the curative effects of the waters on scrofula, often a tuberculosis-associated lymphadenopathy. Over the following decades, paralleling the popularity of health holidays, the buildings that once housed salt pans and warehouses to obtain the dehydrated salt were converted to fancy hotels and spas. Planning for the building we see today began in 1900, and was modified in 1912 by the architect Ugo Giusti. Work was interrupted during the First World War, but restarted in 1919 under Galileo Chini and his collaborators and resulted in a formal inauguration on May 27, 1923.

The architecture is eclectic and extravagant, with influences that have been attributed to Thai and Hindu architecture. The decoration includes odalisques, and motifs of peacock tails, and bas-reliefs of.

The entrance is framed by two turret-like towers. These are surmounted at the corners with exotic banner-poles with onion bases. The awkwardly placed pilasters, patched with colorful ceramics, have what appear to be bejeweled capitals. The title Thermae is flanked by griffin-like figures that recall Assyrian artwork. The windows flanking the portal-veranda have sculpted friezes of sensual water carriers. The veranda columns recall the architecture of Hindu temples.

The entrance atrium was decorated by Giuseppe Moroni and presents marble decorations, elaborate stuccos often with weaving designs, and frescoes. The portal leads to an atrium with a grand double staircase, which is flanked by two panels, painted by Chini and portraying Autumn and Spring. The figures float or stand in a dream-like ether exuberantly blooming with forests or rivers of floral and fruit motifs. Chini and his firm designed most of the ceramic wall decorations, windows, and even furniture. The counter-facade was painted with the Triptych of Hygieia by Moroni, alluding to the building's therapeutic functions.

== Gallery ==
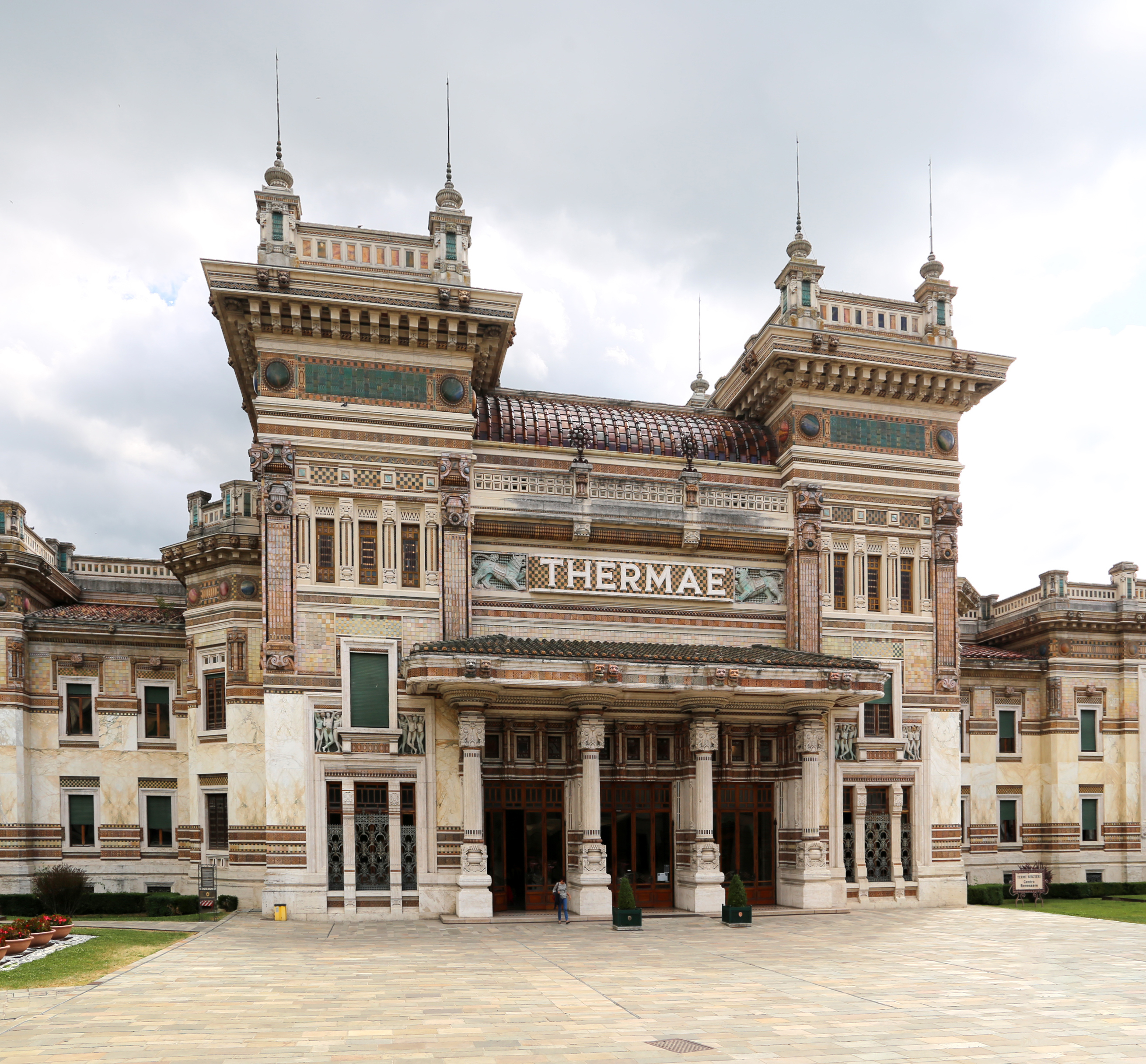
Main entrance

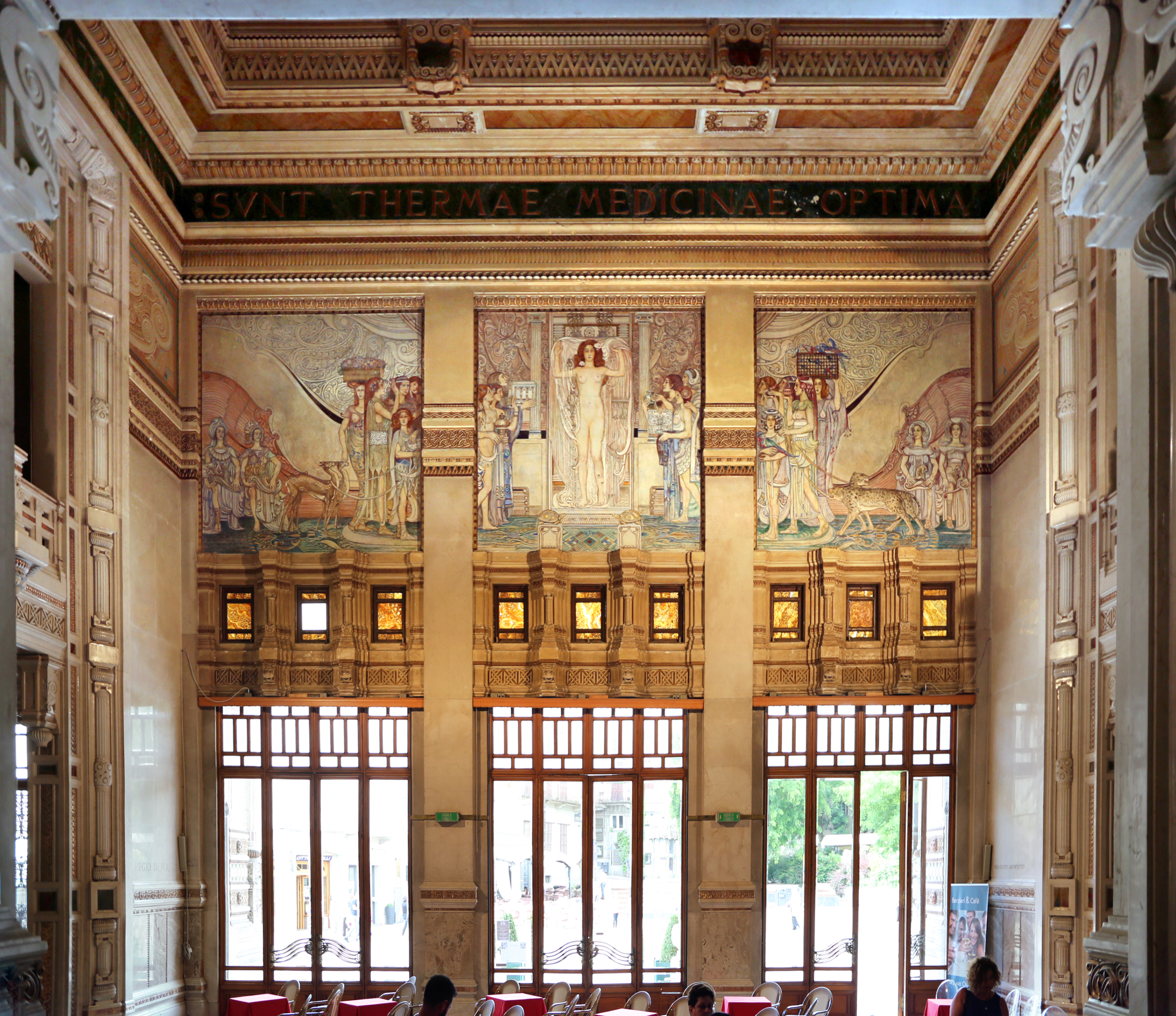
Triumph of Hygea by Moroni

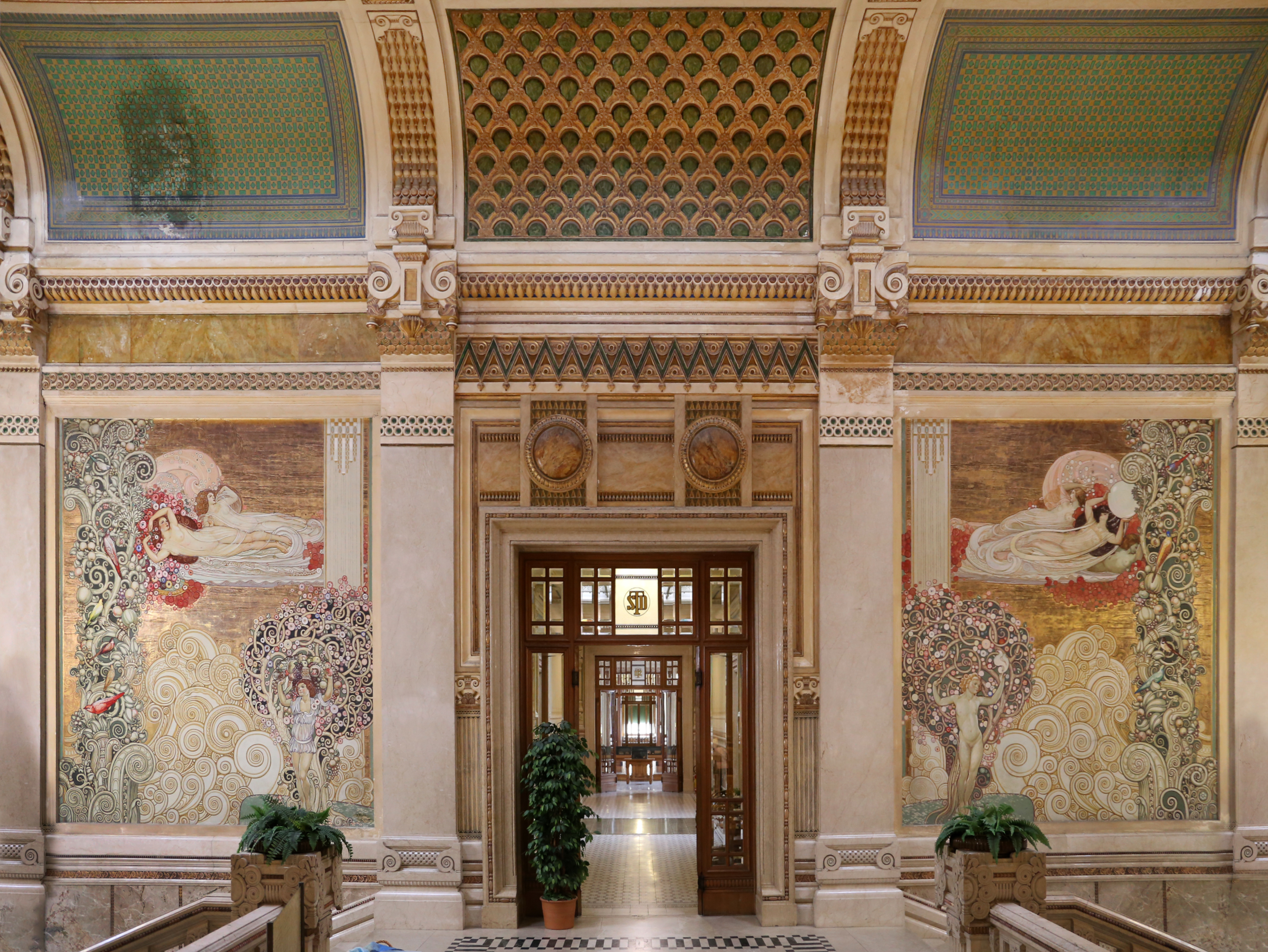
Autumn and Spring by Chini

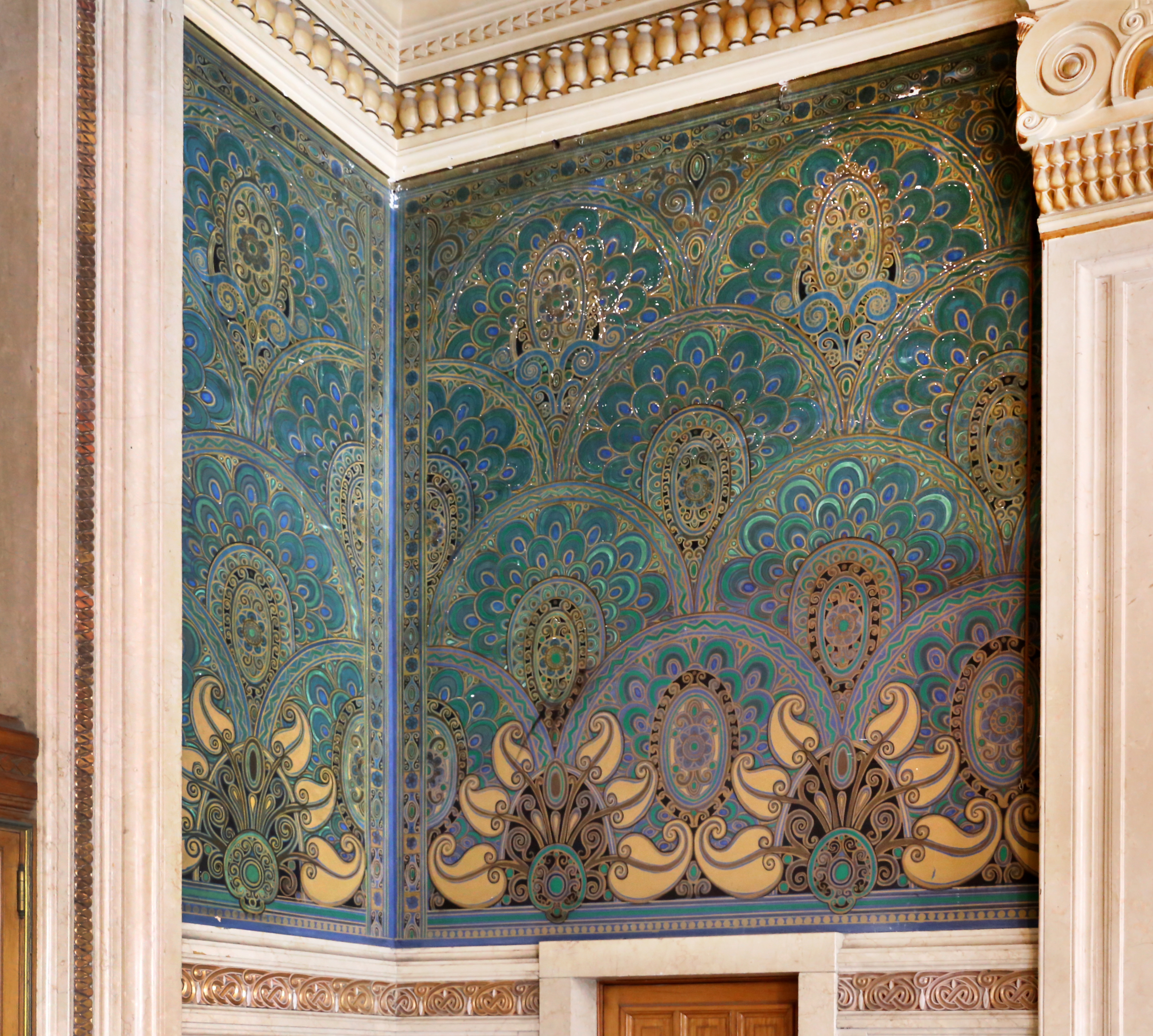
Interior wall details

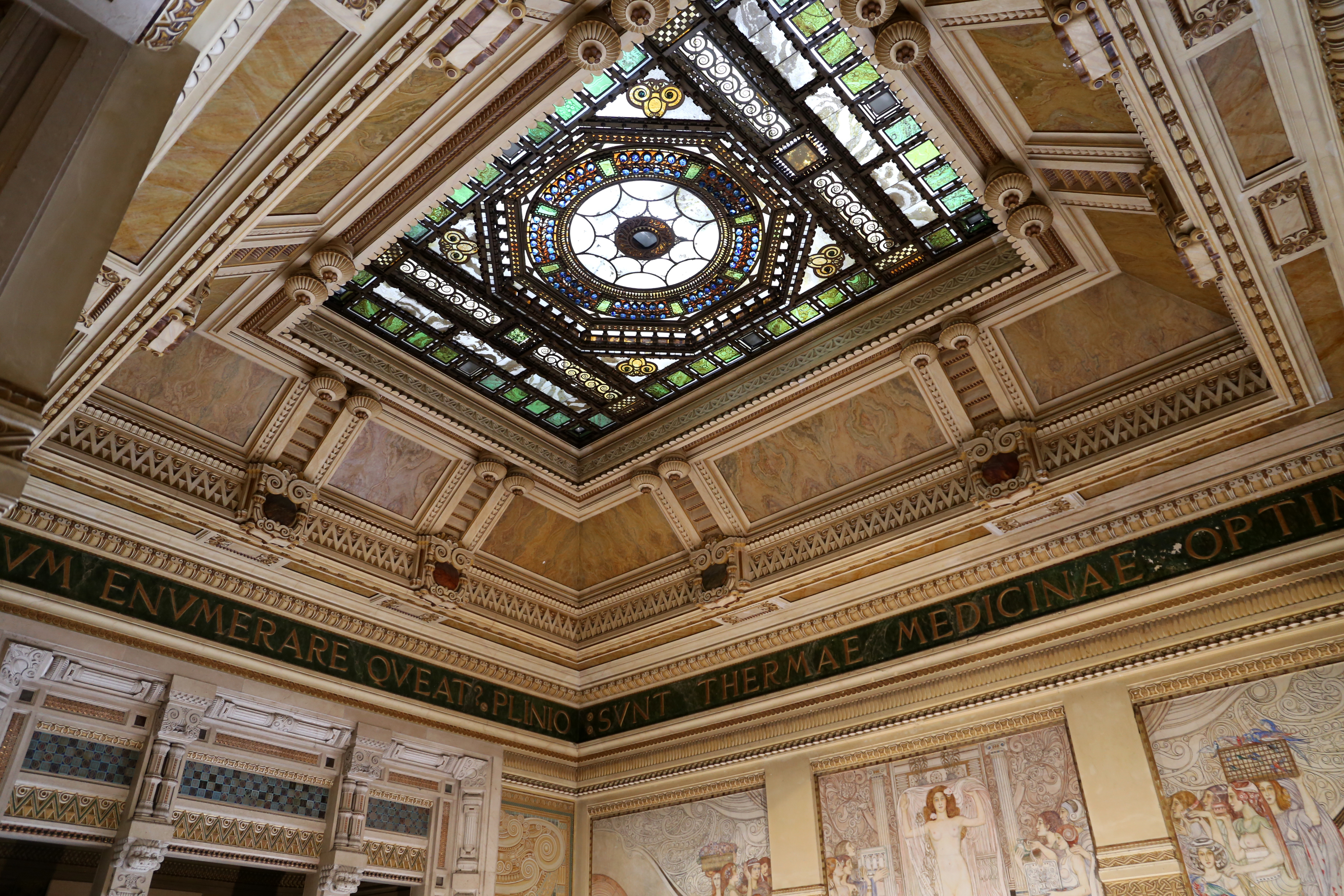
Atrium ceiling
