= Pilín León =

Venezuelan writer for newspapers (born 1963)

- Born: Carmen Josefina León Crespo; May 19, 1963 (age 63); Maracay, Aragua, Venezuela
- Height: 1.78 m (5 ft 10 in)
- Beauty pageant titleholder
- Title: Miss World Venezuela 1981; Miss World 1981
- Hair color: Blonde
- Eye color: Brown
- Major competitions: Miss Venezuela 1981 (1st runner-up) (Miss World Venezuela); Miss World 1981 (Winner) (Miss World Americas)

Pilín León (born Carmen Josefina León Crespo, May 19, 1963) is a Venezuelan writer and beauty queen who won Miss World 1981 in London, she previously won Miss World Venezuela 1981.

She is also the second Venezuelan to win the Miss World title, some 26 years after Susana Duijm won it in 1955, and ending a year of drought for Venezuela's crown, and paving the way for the four Venezuelan winners later in 1984, 1991, 1955 and their recent win in 2011.

== Career ==
León was born in Maracay, Aragua. She became the second Venezuelan (Susana Duijm was the first in 1955) to win the title. As Miss World in 1981, she was the first celebrity to switch on the Christmas lights in Oxford Street in 1981. She hosted the OTI Festival 1984, along Raúl Velasco and Claudia Córdoba, from Mexico City.

In 2014, she was a guest judge in the final Mister World 2014 beauty pageant in Torbay, England.

Awards and achievements
Preceded by (Guam) Kimberley Santos	Miss World; 1981	Succeeded by (Dominican Republic) Mariasela Álvarez
First	Miss World Americas; 1981	Succeeded by (Dominican Republic) Mariasela Álvarez
Preceded by Hilda Abrahamz	Miss World Venezuela; 1981	Succeeded by Michelle Shoda
Preceded by Julie Fernández	Miss Aragua; 1981	Succeeded by Conchy Grande
