= Tabiano Terme =

- Frazione
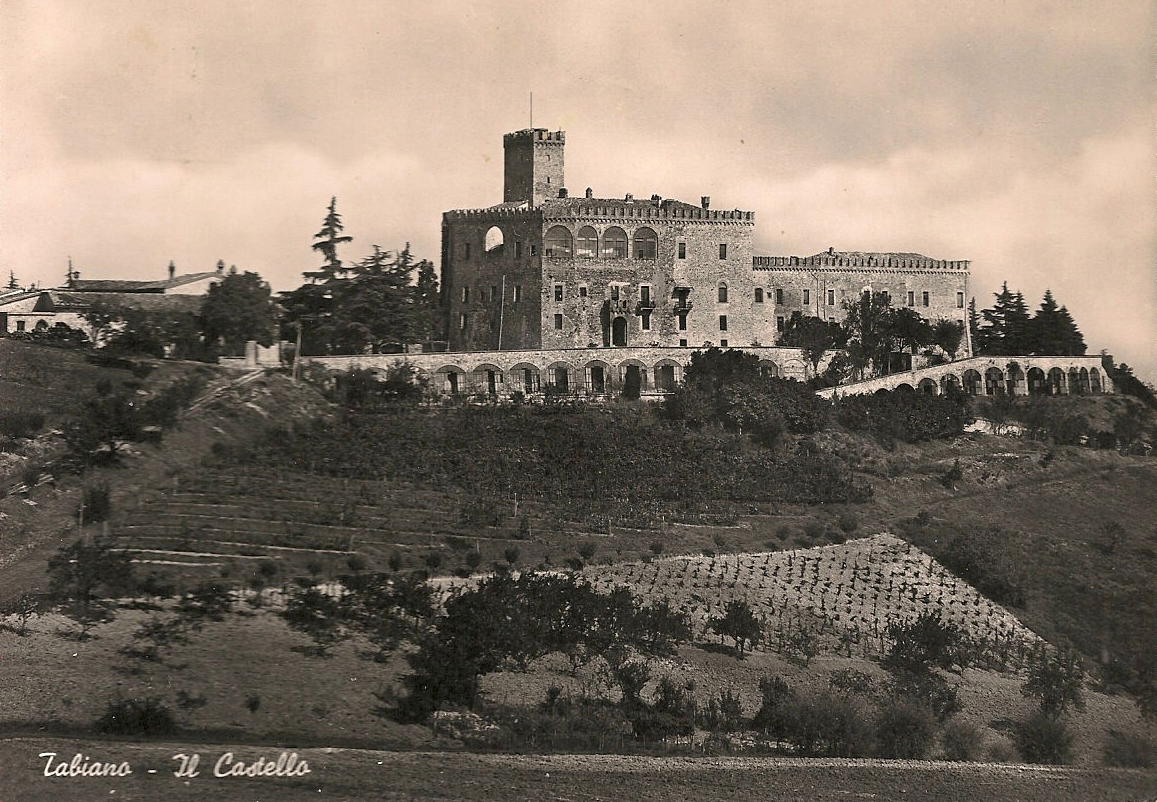

- Location of Tabiano Terme in Italy
- Coordinates: 44°48′15″N 10°01′02″E
- Country: Italy
- Region: Emilia-Romagna
- Province: Parma (PR)
- Comune: Salsomaggiore Terme
- Elevation: 166 m (545 ft)
- Demonym: tabianesi
- Time zone: UTC+1 (CET)
  - Summer (DST): UTC+2 (CEST)
- Postal code: 43039
- Dialing code: 0524
- Website: http://www.comune.salsomaggiore-terme.pr.it/

Tabiano Terme is a frazione of the comune of Salsomaggiore Terme, from which is 4 kilometers distant, located at south of the pre-Apennines of Parma at 166 meters above the sea level.
