= Salsomaggiore Terme =

- Comune
- Città di Salsomaggiore Terme
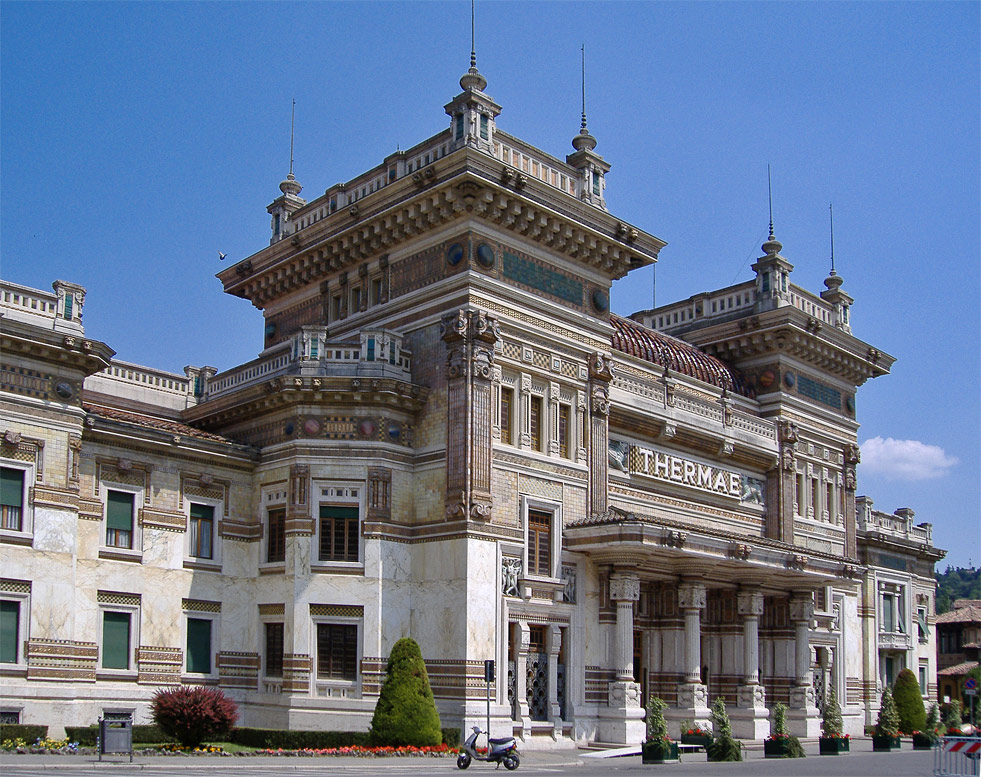
- Palazzo delle Terme Berzieri

- Flag Coat of arms

- Location within Italy Location within Emilia-Romagna
- Coordinates: 44°49′N 09°59′E
- Country: Italy
- Region: Emilia-Romagna
- Province: Parma (PR)
- Frazioni: See list

Government
  - Mayor: Luca Musile Tanzi (Centre-right)

Area
  - Total: 81.68 km^{2} (31.54 sq mi)
- Elevation: 157 m (515 ft)

Population (31 December 2010)
  - Total: 20,051
  - Density: 245.5/km^{2} (635.8/sq mi)
- Demonym: Salsese
- Time zone: UTC+1 (CET)
  - Summer (DST): UTC+2 (CEST)
- Postal code: 43039
- Dialing code: 0524
- Patron saint: St. Vitalis
- Saint day: April 28
- Website: Official website

Salsomaggiore Terme (Salsese: Sèls; Parmigiano: Sälsmagiór) is a town and comune located in the Italian province of Parma, in the region of Emilia-Romagna. Located at the foot of the Apennines, its warm saline waters made this a popular Spa town.

== History ==
In the first half of the 19th century, during the reign of Marie Louise, Duchess of Parma, the thermal waters of Salsomaggiore became attractive to visitors for having therapeutic purposes. The mineral waters of Salsomaggiore belong to the bromo-iodine group salty waters. A hypertonic and cold water extracted from artesian wells, 800 to 1,200 metres (2,600 to 3,900 ft) deep, at a temperature of 16 °C (61 °F) and at a density of 16° on the Baumé scale (1 degree Baumé is equivalent to approximately 11 grams (0.39 oz) salt per litre). The main focus of the town became its baths, notably the "terme" located in the center. These and the hotels affiliated with the town include:

- Palazzo dei Congressi
- Palazzo delle Terme Berzieri

The town remains attractive to visitors. Since 2007 Salsomaggiore is home of the European Festival called Incontrarsi a Salsomaggiore, a celebration of art, music and theater dedicated to women and their health. Around the central piazza are clothing shops and a gelateria. The town has a large number of villas and hotels some of whom (like the Grand Hotel Regina), have events such Miss Italia competition, held here until 2010. Two nearby villages, Salsominore and Tabiano, also have thermal springs. Salsomaggiore Terme is a World Trade Center (WTC).

== Climate ==
Climate data for Salsomaggiore Terme
Month	Jan	Feb	Mar	Apr	May	Jun	Jul	Aug	Sep	Oct	Nov	Dec	Year
Mean daily maximum °C (°F)	4.4 (39.9)	7.6 (45.7)	12.3 (54.1)	17.3 (63.1)	21.6 (70.9)	26 (79)	28.9 (84.0)	27.7 (81.9)	23.8 (74.8)	17 (63)	10.9 (51.6)	5.3 (41.5)	16.9 (62.5)
Daily mean °C (°F)	1.3 (34.3)	3.6 (38.5)	7.7 (45.9)	12.2 (54.0)	16.4 (61.5)	20.3 (68.5)	23.1 (73.6)	22.2 (72.0)	18.8 (65.8)	13 (55)	7.6 (45.7)	2.7 (36.9)	12.4 (54.3)
Mean daily minimum °C (°F)	−1.7 (28.9)	−0.3 (31.5)	3.2 (37.8)	7.1 (44.8)	11.2 (52.2)	14.7 (58.5)	17.3 (63.1)	16.7 (62.1)	13.8 (56.8)	9.1 (48.4)	4.3 (39.7)	0.1 (32.2)	8.0 (46.3)
Source: CLIMATE-DATA.ORG

== Sports ==
From March 27 to April 9, 2022, the 45th World Bridge Championship was held here.

== People ==
- Dina Barberini (1862–1932), soprano

== Frazioni ==
The Frazioni of Salsomaggiore Terme include:

Bargone, Cangelasio, Ceriati, Contiginaco-Cella, Costa, Costamarenga, Fornacchia, Gorzano, I Passeri, Longone-Colombaia, Montauro, Pie' di Via, Pieve di Cusignano, Rossi, Salsominore, San Nicomede, San Vittore, Scipione Castello, Scipione Ponte, Tabiano Terme, Tosini, Vascelli.

== Twin cities ==
- Luxeuil-les-Bains, France
- Hammam-Lif, Tunisia
- Yalta, Ukraine

== See also ==
- Tabiano Castle
