= Goizeder Azúa =

Venezuelan model, presenter, journalist, and beauty queen

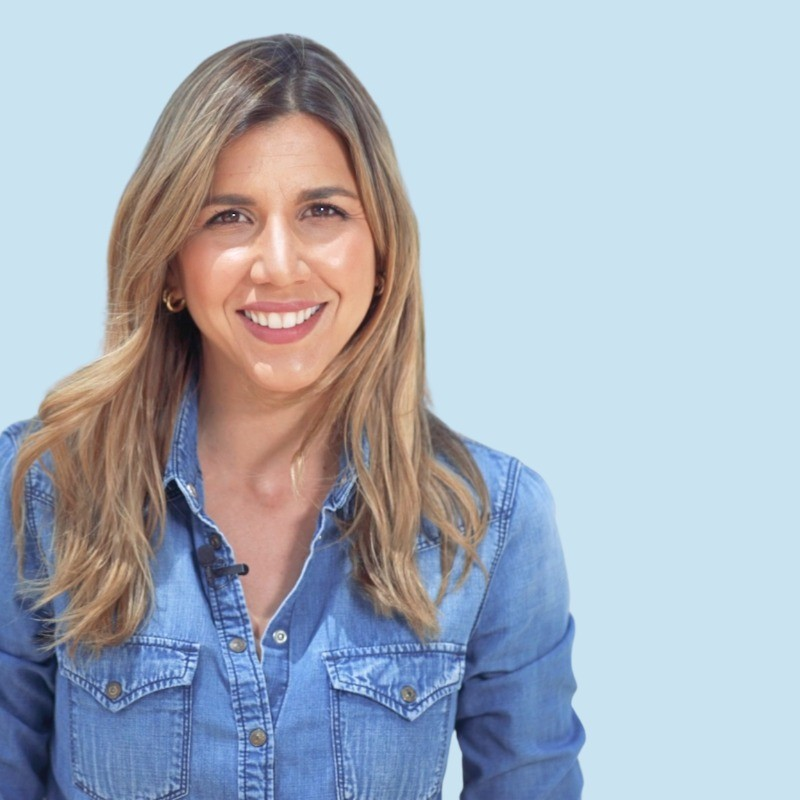
- Born: Goizeder Victoria Azúa Barríos; February 23, 1984 (age 42); San Felipe, Venezuela
- Height: 1.77 m (5 ft 10 in)
- Beauty pageant titleholder
- Title: Miss Carabobo 2002; Miss Venezuela World 2002; Miss Venezuela International 2003; Miss International 2003
- Hair color: Brown
- Eye color: Brown
- Major competitions: Miss Venezuela 2002 (Miss Venezuela World 2002); Miss World 2002 (Top 10); Miss Mesoamerica; 2003 (Winner); Miss International 2003 (Winner) (Miss Photogenic)

Goizeder Victoria Azúa Barríos (born February 23, 1984) is a Venezuelan television host, anchorwoman, model, journalist and beauty queen who won Miss International 2003.

== Career ==
=== Miss Venezuela 2002 ===
She began her beauty pageant career by winning the Miss Carabobo 2002 title, and then by winning the Miss Venezuela World 2002 crown in the Gala de la Belleza preliminary competition of Miss Venezuela 2002.

=== Miss World 2002 ===
Azúa represented Venezuela in the Miss World 2002 pageant, where she placed in the top 10.

=== Miss Mesoamerica 2003 ===
Azúa prior her participation at Miss International 2003 pageant, went to Miss Mesoamerica 2003 in Las Vegas, where she won the crown.

=== Miss International 2003 ===
Azúa was appointed to represent Venezuela in the Miss International 2003 pageant, where she won the crown. Her win marked the fourth of nine victories of Venezuela in Miss International, the most of any nation.

=== Life after Miss International 2003 ===
Once considered Venezuela's top fashion model, Azúa worked on Globovision as a journalist. She had her own TV program called Fun Race. She worked on Televen as anchorwoman and now she is based in Spain. She is married and has 2 sons.

Awards and achievements
Preceded by (Lebanon) Christina Sawaya	Miss International; 2003	Succeeded by (Colombia) Jeymmy Vargas
Preceded by (Caracas) Cynthia Lander	Miss Venezuela International; 2003	Succeeded by (Zulia) Eleidy Aparicio
Preceded by (Zulia) Andreína Prieto	Miss World Venezuela; 2002	Succeeded by (Miranda (state)) Valentina Patruno
Preceded by Jerika Hoffmann	Miss Carabobo; 2002	Succeeded by Karla de Abreu
