= Irene Sáez =

Venezuelan politician and former Miss Universe

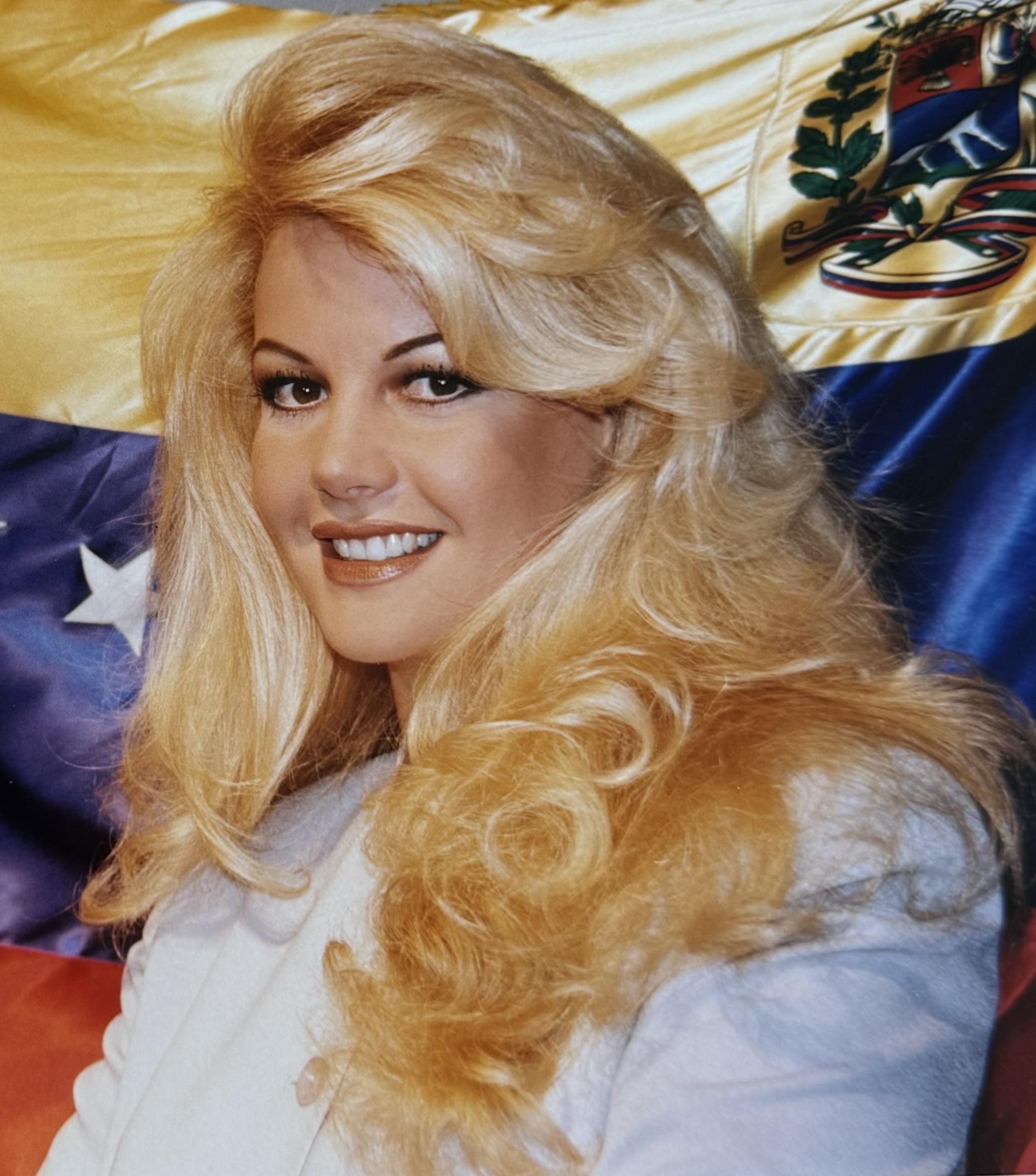
- Irene Sáez circa 1997

Governor of Nueva Esparta
- In office 1999–2000

Mayor of Chacao
- In office 1993–1998

Personal details
- Born: Irene Lailin Sáez Conde; December 13, 1961 (age 64) Chacao, Miranda, Venezuela
- Children: 1
- Beauty pageant titleholder
- Title: Miss Confraternidad Sudamericana 1981; Miss Venezuela 1981; Miss Universe 1981
- Hair color: Blonde
- Eye color: Light Brown
- Major competitions: Miss Venezuela 1981; (Winner); Miss Universe 1981; (Winner)

Irene Lailin Sáez Conde (born 13 December 1961) is a Venezuelan politician and beauty queen who was crowned Miss Universe 1981. She has been a model, was the mayor of Chacao (a municipality of Caracas), governor of the state of Nueva Esparta and a presidential candidate in 1998.

== Early life and education ==
Irene Sáez was born to father Carlos Sáez and mother, Ligia Conde. She spent her childhood in Chacao, Miranda, Venezuela. Her mother died of cancer when Sáez was three and her father died when she was ten. She was brought up by her eldest sister. She has two sisters and three brothers. She started a masters in political science at the Central University of Venezuela, but did not complete it as a result of the February 1992 Venezuelan coup attempt.

== Career ==
=== 1981–1989: Pageant wins and early political roles ===
Early in her career, Sáez was named the Queen of Club Campestre Los Cortijos for three years in a row. Sáez was crowned Miss Venezuela 1981 and later, crowned Miss Universe 1981 at the 30th annual pageant in New York City at the age of 19.

After spending a year traveling the world as Miss Universe, Sáez studied for a masters in political science then served a year as Venezuela's cultural attache to the United States.

Early jobs included modelling for Sasson Jeans and working as a PR consultant to a bank. She also ran the banks non-profit foundation.

=== 1990–1997: Mayor of Chacao ===
In the early 1990s, Sáez turned to electoral politics and a week after the November 1992 coup attempt, led by Hugo Chávez, she was elected mayor of Chacao Municipality, in Caracas. In office as mayor of Chacao Municipality, Sáez tackled its high crime rate by professionalising the municipal police force, with university graduates as officers, higher pay, new police vehicles, and a variety of mobility devices (including roller skates and mountain bikes) allowing the police to move around more quickly. Crime fell dramatically as a result of her innovative ideas. Without political experience or an established party machine, Sáez was content to delegate to experts, and "hired top-notch administrators and listened to their advice about everything from setting the budget to running public services".

In 1995 a Barbie-style doll was modelled on Sáez, about which she says "This shows that dreams can come true."

In December 1995, Sáez was reelected as mayor of Chacao with 96% of the vote, the highest share of the vote in Venezuela's democratic history. The Times of London ranked her 83rd in its list of the 100 most powerful women in the world.

In 1997, she was awarded the Distinguished Achievement Award at the Miss Universe Pageant, a recently created prize of the Miss Universe Organization. She made her acceptance speech in both English and Spanish. Sáez was received at Simón Bolívar International Airport by former president of Venezuela Luis Herrera Campins, who gave her a gold chain for her victory in Miss Universe.

=== 1998: Presidential campaign ===
In 1997 Sáez formed the Integration, Representation and New Hope (IRENE) party as a launch pad for her run in the December 1998 presidential elections. In the final poll of the year in December 1997, one year prior to the presidential elections, she reached almost 70% support.

Sáez won the internal COPEI (Social Christian Party) primary election with 62.7% of the vote, against Eduardo Fernández's 35.7%, at a convention with 1,555 COPEI delegates, an endorsement earned after COPEI realized their Fernández was unable to win. COPEI's leaders ascertained their best bet to remain competitive nationally was to replace Fernández with Sáez, transforming her into the first independent and female candidate supported by a major political party for the presidency of Venezuela.

Despite spending millions of dollars on publicity, Sáez fell below 15% within six months, as the public became increasingly skeptical of her readiness for the presidency and, after accepting the endorsement of COPEI, she lost credibility as an anti-establishment candidate.

Ultimately she finished a distant third behind Chávez and Römer, with 2.82% of the vote.

=== 1999 onwards: Governor of Nueva Esparta and boards ===
Soon after the 1998 presidential election, Sáez was elected governor of the state of Margarita Island, Nueva Esparta, in an election made necessary by the January 1999 death in office of Rafael Tovar. She won with more than 70% of the votes, defeating the Democratic Action candidate. She served as governor of the state until 2000, stepping down when she became pregnant.

Since 2003, Sáez has lived in Miami, where she was named to the board of directors of the Colonial BancGroup, south Florida region.

== See also ==
- List of Venezuela governors
- List of Miss Universe titleholders
- List of Miss Universe runners-up and finalists
- List of Miss Venezuela contestants
- List of Miss Venezuela titleholders
- List of Venezuelans
- List of Venezuelan Americans
- Leni Robredo

Awards and achievements
Preceded by (United States) Shawn Weatherly	Miss Universe; 1981	Succeeded by (Canada) Karen Baldwin
First	Miss Confraternidad Sudamericana; 1981	Vacant Title next held by (Venezuela) Paola Ruggeri (1983) as Miss Sudamérica
Preceded by Maye Brandt	Miss Venezuela; 1981	Succeeded by Ana Teresa Oropeza
Preceded by Alida Bello	Miss Miranda; 1981	Succeeded by Lily Protovin
