= Miss Universe 1981 =

30th Miss Universe pageant

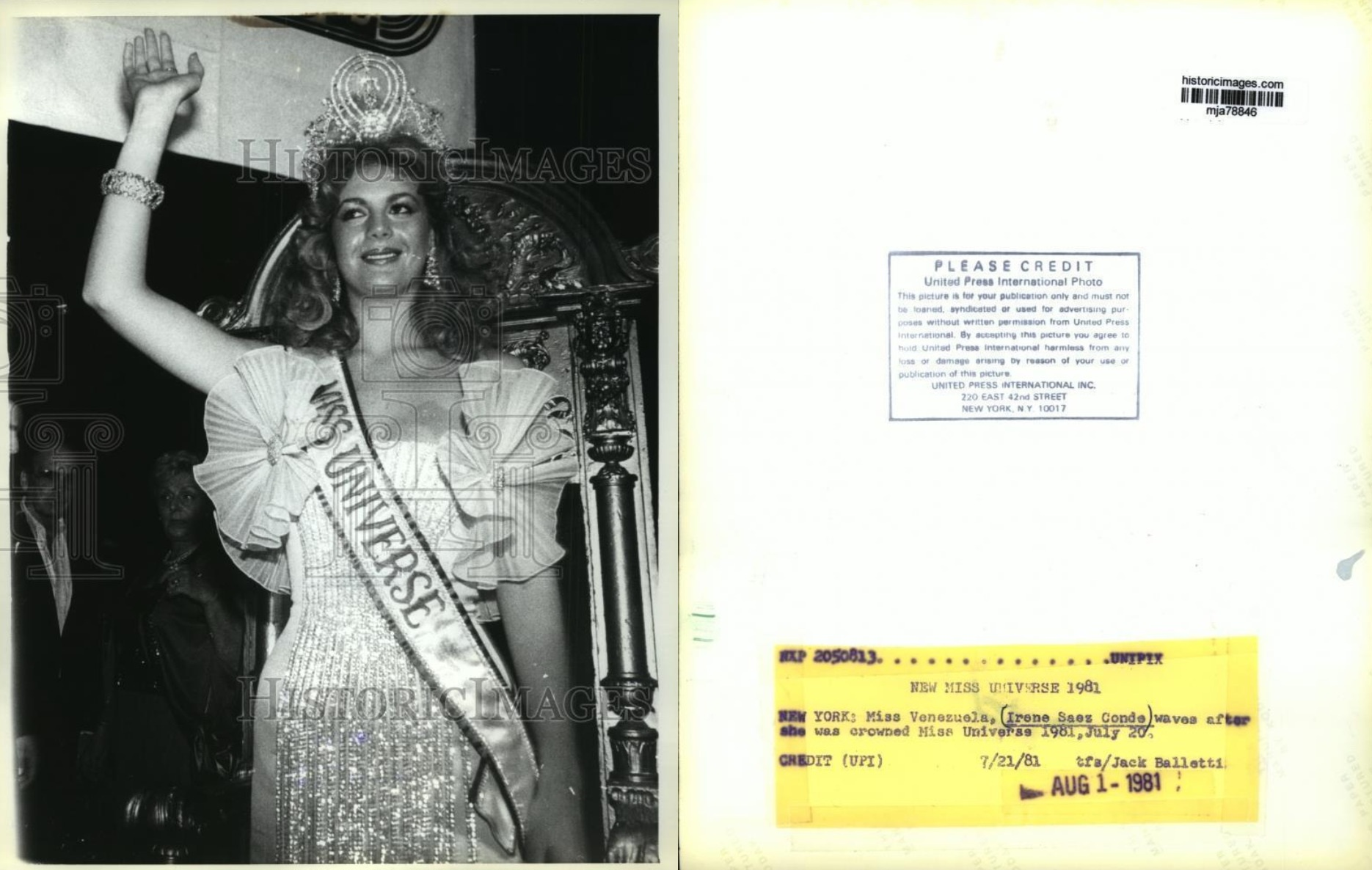
- Irene Sáez
- Date: 20 July 1981
- Presenters: Bob Barker, Elke Sommer
- Entertainment: Peter Allen; Cast of 42nd Street; US Naval Choir
- Venue: Minskoff Theatre, New York City, New York, United States
- Broadcaster: CBS (WCBS-TV)
- Entrants: 76
- Placements: 12
- Debuts: Gibraltar; Namibia; Western Samoa
- Withdrawals: Indonesia; Mauritius; Papua New Guinea; Sint Maarten
- Returns: Cyprus; Fiji; Martinique; Portugal; South Africa; Saint Kitts; Transkei
- Winner: Irene Sáez; Venezuela
- Congeniality: Linda Smith (Bahamas)
- Best National Costume: Adriana Alves de Oliveira (Brazil)
- Photogenic: Tina Brandstrup (Denmark)

Miss Universe 1981 was the 30th anniversary of the Miss Universe pageant, held at the Minskoff Theatre in New York City, New York, United States, on 20 July 1981. At the conclusion of the event, Irene Sáez of Venezuela was crowned by Shawn Weatherly of the United States. There were 77 contestants competing for the crown, but Miss Mauritius got homesick and withdrew. The pageant originally was scheduled to be held in Guatemala City, Guatemala. However, for financial and political reasons, Miss Universe was moved to New York City.

== Results ==
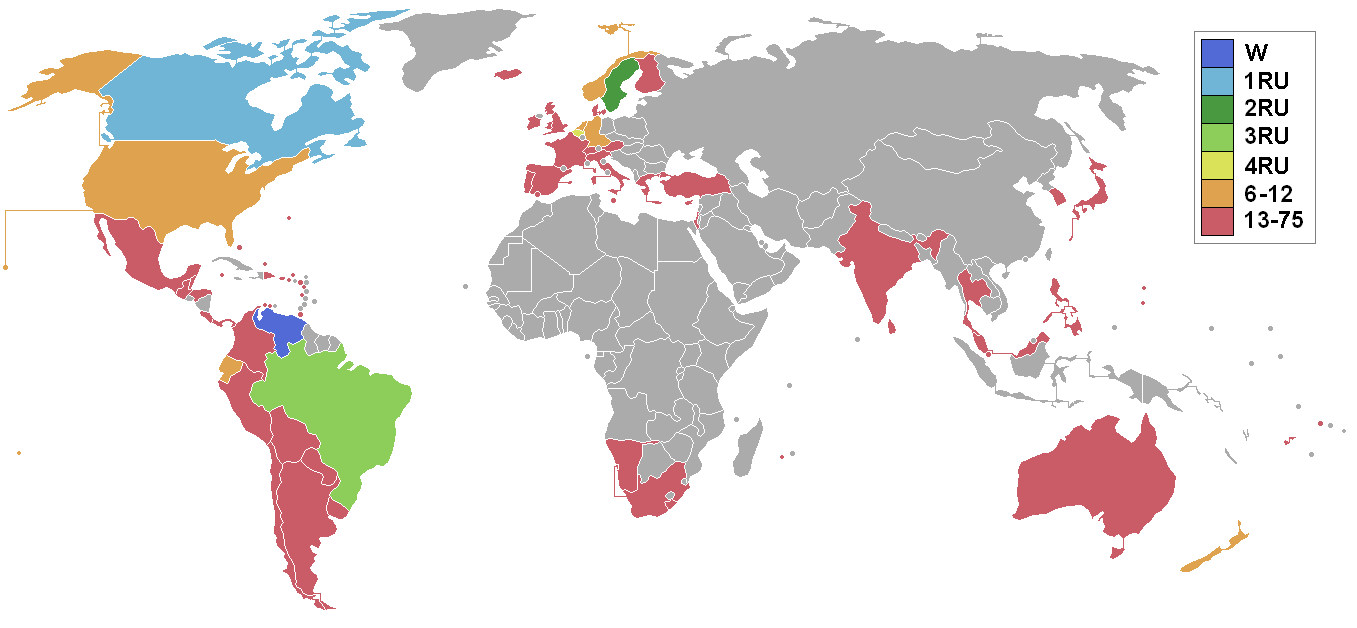
Miss Universe 1981 participating nations and results

=== Placements ===
Placement	Contestant
Miss Universe 1981	Venezuela – Irene Sáez
1st Runner-Up	Canada – Dominique Dufour
2nd Runner-Up	Sweden – Eva-Lena Lundgren
3rd Runner-Up	Brazil – Adriana Alves de Oliveira
4th Runner-Up	Belgium – Dominique van Eeckhoudt
Top 12	Ecuador – Lucía Vinueza; Holland – Ingrid Schouten; New Zealand – Donella Thomsen; Norway – Mona Olsen; (French Polynesia) Tahiti – Tatiana Teraiamano; United States – Kim Seelbrede; West Germany – Marion Kurz

Key
	Winner
	First runner-up
	Second runner-up
	Third runner-up
	Fourth runner-up
(#)	Rank in each round of competition

==== Final Scores ====
Country/Territory	Preliminary Average	Interview	Swimsuit	Evening Gown	Semifinal Average
Venezuela	8.575 (1)	8.966 (1)	9.024 (1)	8.887 (1)	8.959 (1)
Canada	7.913 (12)	8.167 (6)	8.133 (5)	8.508 (2)	8.269 (4)
Sweden	7.967 (9)	8.658 (2)	8.050 (6)	8.179 (4)	8.296 (3)
Brazil	8.330 (4)	8.191 (5)	8.416 (3)	7.824 (7)	8.144 (5)
Belgium	8.223 (6)	8.529 (3)	8.881 (2)	8.268 (3)	8.559 (2)
(France) Tahiti	7.940 (11)	8.149 (7)	8.137 (4)	7.962 (5)	8.082 (6)
Norway	8.259 (5)	8.435 (4)	7.717 (8)	7.838 (6)	7.997 (7)
Germany	8.400 (3)	7.875 (8)	8.041 (7)	7.442 (10)	7.786 (8)
Holland	8.133 (7)	7.590 (9)	7.633 (9)	7.625 (9)	7.616 (9)
United States	8.527 (2)	7.427 (11)	7.617 (10)	7.653 (8)	7.565 (10)
Ecuador	7.967 (9)	7.442 (10)	7.300 (12)	7.317 (12)	7.353 (11)
New Zealand	8.063 (8)	6.950 (12)	7.492 (11)	7.350 (11)	7.264 (12)

=== Awards ===
Special Awards	Winners
Miss Amity	Bahamas – Linda Smith
Miss Photogenic	Denmark – Tina Brandstrup
Best National Costume	Brazil – Adriana Alves de Oliveira

== Contestants ==
Seventy-six contestants competed for the title.

Country/Territory	Contestant	Age (Note: Ages at the time of the pageant)	Hometown
Argentina	Susana Reynoso	20	Buenos Aires
Aruba	Synia Reyes	18	Brasília
Australia	Karen Sang	21	Sydney
Austria	Gudrun Gollop	22	Vienna
(The Bahamas) Bahamas	Linda Smith	21	Nassau
Belgium	Dominique van Eeckhoudt	20	Brussels
Belize	Ivette Zabaneh	18	Belmopan
Bermuda	Cymone Tucker	21	Smith's Parish
Bolivia	Maricruz Aponte	18	Santa Cruz de la Sierra
Brazil	Adriana Alves	18	Rio de Janeiro
British Virgin Islands	Carmen Nibbs	18	Tortola
Canada	Dominique Dufour	22	Laval
Cayman Islands	Donna Myrie	20	George Town
Chile	Soledad Hurtado	19	Valparaíso
Colombia	Ana Edilma Cano	18	Medellín
Costa Rica	Rosa Inés Solís	19	San José
(Netherlands Antilles) Curaçao	Maria Maxima Croes	22	Willemstad
Cyprus	Katia Angelidou	18	Larnaca
Denmark	Tina Brandstrup	20	Copenhagen
Dominican Republic	Lucía Peña	17	Puerto Plata
Ecuador	Lucía Vinueza	18	Guayaquil
England	Joanna Longley	25	Windsor
Fiji	Lynn McDonald	22	Suva
Finland	Merja Varvikko	20	Forssa
France	Isabelle Benard	23	Normandy
(France) French Polynesia	Tatiana Teraiamano	18	Papeete
Gibraltar	Yvette Dominguez	19	Gibraltar
Greece	Maria Nikouli	18	Athens
Guadeloupe	Rosette Bivuoac	17	Basse-Terre
Guam	Bertha Harmon	17	Hagåtña
Guatemala	Yuma Lobos	19	Guatemala City
(Netherlands) Holland	Ingrid Schouten	20	The Hague
Honduras	Leslie Sabillón	19	Francisco Morazán
(British Hong Kong) Hong Kong	Irene Lo	21	Hong Kong
Iceland	Elisabet Trausdóttir	17	Reykjavík
India	Rachita Kumar	19	Mumbai
(Republic of Ireland) Ireland	Valerie Roe	21	Dublin
Israel	Dana Wexler	17	Giv'atayim
Italy	Anna Kanakis	20	Messina
Japan	Mineko Orisaku	20	Kyoto
Malaysia	Audrey Loh	21	Kuala Lumpur
Malta	Susanne Galea	19	St Julians
Martinique	Ghislaine Jean-Louis	–	Fort-de-France
Mexico	Judith Grace	18	Monterrey
(South West Africa) Namibia	Antoinette Knoetze	22	Windhoek
New Zealand	Donella Thomsen	21	Birkenhead
Northern Mariana Islands	Juanita Mendiola	17	Tinian
Norway	Mona Olsen	20	Oslo
Panama	Ana María Henríquez	21	Panama City
Paraguay	María Isabel Urízar	18	Asunción
Peru	Gladys Silva	20	Lima
Philippines	Maria Caroline Mendoza	18	Manila
Portugal	Ana Paula Machado	24	Lisbon
Puerto Rico	Carmen Lotti Rodríguez	20	Guaynabo
Réunion	Patricia Abadie	19	Saint-Paul
Saint Christopher-Nevis-Anguilla	Marva Warner	24	Sandy Point Town
Scotland	Anne McFarlane	18	Glasgow
Singapore	Florence Tan	21	Singapore
South Africa	Daniela di Paolo	19	Durban
South Korea	Lee Eun-jung	18	Seoul
Spain	Frances Ondiviela	24	Las Palmas
Sri Lanka	Renuka Jesudhason	18	Matale
Sweden	Eva-Lena Lundgren	19	Piteå
Switzerland	Bridget Voss	21	Bern
Thailand	Massupha Karbprapun	21	Bangkok
Transkei	Kedibone Letlaka	19	Tsolo
Trinidad and Tobago	Romini Samaroo	19	San Fernando
Turkey	Şenay Unlu	21	Ankara
Turks and Caicos Islands	Frances Gloria Rigby	23	Grand Turk
United States	Kim Seelbrede	20	Germantown
United States Virgin Islands	Marise Cecile James	23	Saint Croix
Uruguay	Griselda Anchorena	20	Montevideo
(Venezuela) Venezuela	Irene Sáez	19	Caracas
Wales	Karen Stannard	22	Newport
West Germany	Marion Kurz	20	Bavaria
Western Samoa	Lenita Schwalger	18	Apia

== Withdrawals ==
- Mauritius – Carole Fitzgerald was homesick and then withdrew.
