= Mariángel Ruiz =

Venezuelan TV host, actress and model (born 1980)

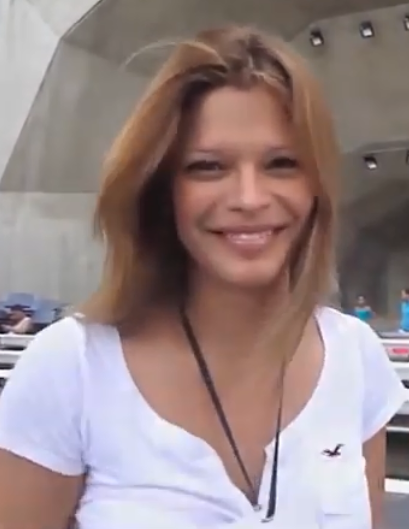
- Ruiz in 2020
- Born: Mariángel Ruiz Torrealba; 7 January 1980 (age 46); San Juan de los Morros, Guárico, Venezuela
- Spouse: Tony Álvarez (m. 2006; div. 2008)
- Children: 1
- Beauty pageant titleholder
- Title: Miss Venezuela 2002
- Years active: 2002–present
- Major competitions: Miss Venezuela 2002 (Winner); Miss Universe 2003 (1st Runner-Up)
- Website: www.mariangelruiz.com.ve

Mariángel Ruiz Torrealba (born 7 January 1980) is a Venezuelan actress, model and beauty pageant titleholder. Winning Miss Venezuela 2002 as Miss Aragua, she then placed 1st runner-up at Miss Universe 2003.

== Pageant career ==
=== Miss Venezuela 2002 ===
Ruiz tried twice for the Miss Venezuela title, the first time in 1998 when she did not place in the top 120 candidates. In 2002, she won the preliminary casting in Maracay, becoming Miss Aragua 2002. Ruiz won the pageant, which for the first time was judged entirely by former Miss Venezuela titleholders.

=== Miss Universe 2003 ===
One 9 May 2003, the Miss Venezuela Organization announced that Ruiz would not compete at Miss Universe. This was due to strict foreign exchange controls imposed by then-Venezuelan President Hugo Chavez to prevent capital flight, which made the organization unable to send Ruiz to Panama. However, Venezuelan businessman Gustavo Cisneros provided funding for Ruiz to compete in Panama. Mireya Moscoso, then-President of Panama, had urged Cisneros to ensure that a Venezuelan candidate would compete at Miss Universe.

== Personal life ==
She was born in San Juan de los Morros, Guárico. In December 2005, she announced her marriage and pregnancy to Major League Baseball center fielder Tony Álvarez. Their civil wedding was the same month, and their religious wedding was held on 28 January 2006. Ruiz gave birth to a girl named Mariángel Victoria, in August of the same year. The two divorced in 2008.

Awards and achievements
Preceded by (Panama) Justine Pasek	Miss Universe 1st runner-up 2003	Succeeded by (United States) Shandi Finnessey
Preceded by Cynthia Lander	Miss Venezuela; 2002	Succeeded by Ana Karina Áñez
Preceded by Keidy Moreno	Miss Aragua; 2002	Succeeded by Aura Avila
