= Miss Polski 2020 =

- Date: January 17, 2021
- Presenters: Paulina Sykut-Jeżyna; Krzysztof Ibisz; Agnieszka Hyży
- Entertainment: Anna Wyszkoni; Monika Lewczuk; Kortez; Paweł Domagała
- Venue: Warsaw, Masovia, Poland
- Broadcaster: Polsat
- Entrants: 23
- Placements: 10
- Withdrawals: Opole; Pomerania; Subcarpathia; Polish Community in the U.K.
- Returns: Kuyavia-Pomerania; Lublin; Lubusz; Upper Poland
- Winner: Anna Maria Jaromin; Silesia

Miss Polski 2020 was the 31st Miss Polski pageant, held on January 17, 2021. The winner was Anna Maria Jaromin of Silesia. Jaromin was originally supposed to represent Poland in Miss Supranational 2021 but withdrew due to the Miss Polski Organization having other plans for Jaromin at other international contests, mainly Miss International 2022. The 1st Runner-up, Natalia Balicka of Upper Poland, replaced her and represented the country at Miss Supranational. This years pageant was originally slated for December 2020 but was post-poned to January 2021 due to the COVID-19 pandemic.

== Final results ==
Final results	Contestant
Miss Polski 2020	Silesia – Anna Maria Jaromin
1st Runner-Up; Miss Supranational Poland 2021	Upper Poland – Natalia Balicka
2nd Runner-Up	Podlasie – Wiktoria Ciochanowska
3rd Runner-Up	Łódź – Dominika Wójcik
4th Runner-Up	Silesia – Sandra Naum
Top 10	Lower Silesia – Agata Śron; Lower Silesia – Ewa Jakubiec; Lublin – Wiktoria Kozik; Lubusz – Laura Wycichowska; West Pomerania – Małgorzata Molik

=== Special awards ===
Award	Contestant
Miss Polsat Viewers	Podlasie – Wiktoria Ciochanowska
Miss Virtual Poland	Lubusz – Laura Wycichowska

== Jury ==
The jury (judging panel) consisted of:

- Ewa Wachowicz - Miss Polonia 1992 & World Miss University 1993
- Viola Piekut
- Ania Wyszkoni
- Joanna Liszkowska
- Elżbieta Sawerska - Miss Polski 2004
- Katarzyna Krzeszowska - Miss Polski 2012
- Olga Buława - Miss Polski 2018
- Magdalena Kasiborska - Miss Polski 2019

== Finalists ==
Represents	Candidate	Age	Height	Title/Qualification Method
Kuyavia-Pomerania	Klaudia Andrzejewska	19		
Łódź	Dominika Wójcik	19		
Lower Poland	Justyna Haberka	20		
Lower Poland	Żaneta Kotarba	22		
Lower Silesia	Agata Śron	19		
Lower Silesia	Ewa Jakubiec	23		
Lublin	Olga Król	19		
Lublin	Wiktoria Kozik	18		
Lubusz	Julia Gryczan	23		
Lubusz	Laura Wycichowska	21		
Masovia	Angelika Duszczyk	27		
Masovia	Marta Byczuk	27		
Masovia	Nina Ampulska	18		
Podlasie	Wiktoria Ciochanowska	20		
Silesia	Anna Maria Jaromin	22		
Silesia	Natalia Ciekańska	20		
Silesia	Roksana Jagła	22		
Silesia	Sandra Naum	22		
Upper Poland	Martyna Zimmer	20		
Upper Poland	Natalia Balicka	21		
Warmia-Masuria	Anita Sawicka	21		
West Pomerania	Klaudia Matczak	21		
West Pomerania	Małgorzata Molik	25		

== Notes ==
=== Withdrawals ===
- Lubusz - Sandra Krenc
- Opole
- Pomerania
- Subcarpathia
- Polish Community in the U.K. - Sabrinę Olkowicz

=== Returns ===
Last competed in 2016:

- Lubusz

Last competed in 2017:

- Upper Poland

Last competed in 2018:

- Kuyavia-Pomerania
- Lublin

=== Did not compete ===
- Holy Cross
- Polish Community in Argentina
- Polish Community in Australia
- Polish Community in Belarus
- Polish Community in Brazil
- Polish Community in Canada
- Polish Community in Czechia
- Polish Community in France
- Polish Community in Germany
- Polish Community in Ireland
- Polish Community in Israel
- Polish Community in Kazakhstan
- Polish Community in Lithuania
- Polish Community in Russia
- Polish Community in Slovakia
- Polish Community in South Africa
- Polish Community in Sweden
- Polish Community in Ukraine
- Polish Community in the U.S.
- Polish Community in Venezuela
