= Miss Polski 2021 =

- Date: August 20, 2021
- Presenters: Krzysztof Ibisz; Izabela Janachowska; Ilona Krawczyńska
- Entertainment: Kayah; Viki Gabor; Anna Karwan; Nicka Sincklera
- Venue: Strzelecki Park Amphitheater, Nowy Sącz, Lower Poland, Poland
- Broadcaster: Polsat
- Entrants: 24
- Placements: 10
- Withdrawals: Kuyavia-Pomerania; Lublin; Masovia; Warmia-Masuria
- Returns: Polish Community in the U.K.
- Winner: Agata Wdowiak; Łódź
- Congeniality: Weronika Przestrzelska (Podlasie)
- Photogenic: Aleksandra Wasik (Podlasie)

Miss Polski 2021 was the 32nd Miss Polski pageant, held on August 20, 2021. The winner was Agata Wdowiak of Łódź. Wdowiak represented Poland in Miss Universe 2021.

== Results ==
=== Placements ===
| Placements | Contestant |
|---|---|
| Miss Polski 2021 | Łódź – Agata Wdowiak |
| 1st Runner-Up | Podlasie – Natalia Brzozowska |
| 2nd Runner-Up | Lower Poland – Magdalena Majda |
| 3rd Runner-Up | Lower Silesia – Dominika Dąda |
| 4th Runner-Up | Lower Silesia – Stella Czyszewicz |
| Top 10 | Lower Poland – Justyna Kokoszka; Lubusz – Paulina Węglarz; Podlasie – Aleksandra Wasik; Silesia – Sara Marut; Polish Community in the U.K. - Sabrinę Olkowicz |

=== Special awards ===
| Award | Contestant |
|---|---|
| Miss Congeniality | Podlasie - Weronika Przestrzelska |
| Miss Grace and Elegance | Lubusz – Paulina Węglarz |
| Miss Internet | Polish Community in the U.K. - Sabrinę Olkowicz |
| Miss Photogenic | Podlasie – Aleksandra Wasik |
| Miss Polsat Viewers | Lower Poland – Justyna Kokoszka |
| Miss Schubert Jeweler | Łódź - Emilia Królikowska |
| Miss Social Media | Łódź - Emilia Królikowska |

== Judges ==
The judges consisted of:

- Ewa Wachowicz - Miss Polonia 1992 & World Miss University 1993
- Viola Piekut
- Edyta Herbuś
- Viki Gabor
- Elżbieta Sawerska - Miss Polski 2004
- Katarzyna Krzeszowska - Miss Polski 2012
- Magdalena Kasiborska - Miss Polski 2019
- Anna-Maria Jaromin - Miss Polski 2020

== Candidates ==
| Voivodeship/Overseas Community | Candidates | Age |
|---|---|---|
| Łódź | Agata Wdowiak | 24 |
| Łódź | Emilia Królikowska | 22 |
| Łódź | Kamila Grzegorczyk | 20 |
| Lower Poland | Gabriela Ziembańska | 23 |
| Lower Poland | Justyna Kokoszka | 18 |
| Lower Poland | Kathrin Januszewska | 18 |
| Lower Poland | Magdalena Majda | 20 |
| Lower Poland | Zofia Krupa | 20 |
| Lower Silesia | Dominika Dąda | 23 |
| Lower Silesia | Jowita Orłowska | 26 |
| Lower Silesia | Pamela Bielawska | 21 |
| Lower Silesia | Stella Czyszewicz | 21 |
| Lubusz | Paulina Węglarz | 24 |
| Podlasie | Aleksandra Wasik | 20 |
| Podlasie | Klaudia Modzelewska | 19 |
| Podlasie | Natalia Brzozowska | 22 |
| Podlasie | Weronika Przestrzelska | 21 |
| Silesia | Angelika Krzymień | 24 |
| Silesia | Sara Marut | 18 |
| Upper Poland | Magdalena Majda | 20 |
| West Pomerania | Agnieszka Szuszkiewicz | 19 |
| West Pomerania | Iwona Górska | 23 |
| Polish Community in the U.K. | Sabrinę Olkowicz | 26 |
| Polish Community in the U.K. | Sandra Salamon | 22 |
