= List of Polsat primetime schedules =

This is a list of Polsat primetime schedules from 2007 to 2012 and schedule from the Fall season of 2023 and onwards.

== Fall 2025 ==
=== Fall 2025 primetime schedule ===
PM	6:45	7:00	7:15	7:30	7:45	8:00	8:15	8:30	8:45	9:00	9:15	9:30	9:45	10:00	10:15	10:30	10:45
Monday	Wydarzenia		TBA	TBA	TBA	Milionerzy		MEGAHIT (movies)									
Tuesday	Wydarzenia		TBA	TBA	TBA	Milionerzy		Ninja vs Ninja								movies / other	
Wednesday	Wydarzenia		TBA	TBA	TBA	Milionerzy		Kabaret K2. Jedziemy po bandzie					Przyjaciółki				TBA
Thursday	Wydarzenia		TBA	TBA	TBA	Milionerzy		Nasz nowy dom						TBA	TBA	TBA	TBA
Friday	Wydarzenia		TBA	TBA	TBA	Twoja twarz brzmi znajomo								Krew			
Saturday	Wydarzenia		TBA	TBA	TBA	Kabaret na żywo. Młodzi i Moralni. Nad mętną rzeką								movies / other			
Sunday	Wydarzenia		TBA	TBA	TBA	Dancing with the Stars. Taniec z gwiazdami										Teściowie	

=== Fall 2025 early fringe schedule ===
PM	2:30	2:45	3:00	3:15	3:30	3:45	4:00	4:15	4:30	4:45	5:00	5:15	5:30	5:45	6:00	6:15	6:30
Monday	Dlaczego ja?					Wydarzenia and weather forecast		Interwencja			Gliniarze				Pierwsza miłość		
Tuesday	Dlaczego ja?					Wydarzenia and weather forecast		Interwencja			Gliniarze				Pierwsza miłość		
Wednesday	Dlaczego ja?					Wydarzenia and weather forecast		Interwencja			Gliniarze				Pierwsza miłość		
Thursday	Dlaczego ja?					Wydarzenia and weather forecast		Interwencja			Gliniarze				Pierwsza miłość		
Friday	Dlaczego ja?					Wydarzenia and weather forecast		Interwencja			Gliniarze				Pierwsza miłość		
Saturday	reruns / other								Randka w ciemno (since Oct.)				Awantura o kasę				
Sunday	reruns / other								TBA	TBA	TBA	TBA	Awantura o kasę				

== Spring 2025 ==
=== Spring 2025 primetime schedule – weekdays ===
PM	6:45	7:00	7:15	7:30	7:45	8:00	8:15	8:30	8:45	9:00	9:15	9:30	9:45	10:00	10:15	10:30	10:45	11:00	11:15
Monday	Wydarzenia		Gość Wydarzeń + sports news and weather forecast		Uroczysko		MEGAHIT (movies)												
Tuesday	Wydarzenia		Gość Wydarzeń + sports news and weather forecast		Uroczysko		Ninja vs Ninja								movies / other				
Wednesday	Wydarzenia		Gość Wydarzeń + sports news and weather forecast		Uroczysko		Kabaret K2. Jedziemy po bandzie						movies / other						
Thursday	Wydarzenia		Gość Wydarzeń + sports news and weather forecast		Uroczysko		Nasz nowy dom				Przyjaciółki					Komisarz Mama			
Friday	Wydarzenia + Lepsza Polska + sports news and weather forecast					Must Be the Music								Krew					movies / other

=== Spring 2025 primetime schedule – weekends ===
PM	5:30	5:45	6:00	6:15	6:30	6:45	7:00	7:15	7:30	7:45	8:00	8:15	8:30	8:45	9:00	9:15	9:30	9:45	10:00	10:15	10:30	10:45
Saturday	Awantura o kasę					Wydarzenia		Prezydenci i premierzy	sports news and weather forecast		Kabaret na żywo. Chyba Czesuaf								movies / other			
Sunday	Awantura o kasę					Wydarzenia		sports news and weather forecast	Państwo w państwie		Dancing with the Stars. Taniec z gwiazdami										Teściowie	

=== Spring 2025 early fringe schedule ===
PM	2:30	2:45	3:00	3:15	3:30	3:45	4:00	4:15	4:30	4:45	5:00	5:15	5:30	5:45	6:00	6:15	6:30
Monday	Dlaczego ja?					Wydarzenia and weather forecast		Interwencja	Na ratunek 112 (reruns after a broadcast on TV4 a day earlier)		Gliniarze				Pierwsza miłość		
Tuesday	Dlaczego ja?					Wydarzenia and weather forecast		Interwencja	Na ratunek 112 (reruns after a broadcast on TV4 a day earlier)		Gliniarze				Pierwsza miłość		
Wednesday	Dlaczego ja?					Wydarzenia and weather forecast		Interwencja	Na ratunek 112 (reruns after a broadcast on TV4 a day earlier)		Gliniarze				Pierwsza miłość		
Thursday	Dlaczego ja?					Wydarzenia and weather forecast		Interwencja	Na ratunek 112 (reruns after a broadcast on TV4 a day earlier)		Gliniarze				Pierwsza miłość		
Friday	Dlaczego ja?					Wydarzenia and weather forecast		Interwencja	Na ratunek 112 (reruns after a broadcast on TV4 a day earlier)		Gliniarze				Pierwsza miłość		

== Fall 2024 ==
=== Fall 2024 primetime schedule – weekdays ===
PM	6:45	7:00	7:15	7:30	7:45	8:00	8:15	8:30	8:45	9:00	9:15	9:30	9:45	10:00	10:15	10:30	10:45
Monday	Wydarzenia		Gość Wydarzeń + sports news and weather forecast	Malanowski. Nowe rozdanie			MEGAHIT (movies)										
Tuesday	Wydarzenia		Gość Wydarzeń + sports news and weather forecast	Malanowski. Nowe rozdanie			Siły specjalne Polska				movies / other						
Wednesday	Wydarzenia		Gość Wydarzeń + sports news and weather forecast	Malanowski. Nowe rozdanie			Moja mama i twój tata				movies / other						
Thursday	Wydarzenia		Gość Wydarzeń + sports news and weather forecast	Malanowski. Nowe rozdanie			Nasz nowy dom				Przyjaciółki				movies / other		
Friday	Wydarzenia + Gość Wydarzeń + sports news and weather forecast					Twoja twarz brzmi znajomo								Grzechy sąsiadów			

=== Fall 2024 primetime schedule – weekends ===
PM	5:30	5:45	6:00	6:15	6:30	6:45	7:00	7:15	7:30	7:45	8:00	8:15	8:30	8:45	9:00	9:15	9:30	9:45	10:00	10:15	10:30	10:45
Saturday	Awantura o kasę (Oct.–Nov.)					Wydarzenia + sports news and weather forecast			Prezydenci i premierzy		Kabaret na żywo								movies / other			
Sunday	Awantura o kasę (Oct.–Nov.)					Wydarzenia + sports news and weather forecast			Państwo w państwie		Dancing with the Stars. Taniec z gwiazdami								Teściowie			

=== Fall 2024 early fringe schedule ===
PM	2:30	2:45	3:00	3:15	3:30	3:45	4:00	4:15	4:30	4:45	5:00	5:15	5:30	5:45	6:00	6:15	6:30
Monday	Dlaczego ja?					Wydarzenia and weather forecast		Interwencja	Na ratunek 112 (reruns after a broadcast on TV4 a day earlier)		Gliniarze				Pierwsza miłość		
Tuesday	Dlaczego ja?					Wydarzenia and weather forecast		Interwencja	Na ratunek 112 (reruns after a broadcast on TV4 a day earlier)		Gliniarze				Pierwsza miłość		
Wednesday	Dlaczego ja?					Wydarzenia and weather forecast		Interwencja	Na ratunek 112 (reruns after a broadcast on TV4 a day earlier)		Gliniarze				Pierwsza miłość		
Thursday	Dlaczego ja?					Wydarzenia and weather forecast		Interwencja	Na ratunek 112 (reruns after a broadcast on TV4 a day earlier)		Gliniarze				Pierwsza miłość		
Friday	Dlaczego ja?					Wydarzenia and weather forecast		Interwencja	Na ratunek 112 (reruns after a broadcast on TV4 a day earlier)		Gliniarze				Pierwsza miłość		

== Spring 2024 ==
=== Spring 2024 primetime schedule ===
PM	6:45	7:00	7:15	7:30	7:45	8:00	8:15	8:30	8:45	9:00	9:15	9:30	9:45	10:00	10:15	10:30	10:45	11:00
Monday	Wydarzenia			Gość Wydarzeń	sports news and weather forecast	MEGAHIT (movies)									movies / other			
Tuesday	Wydarzenia			Gość Wydarzeń	sports news and weather forecast	Ninja Warrior Polska									movies / other			
Wednesday	Wydarzenia			Gość Wydarzeń	sports news and weather forecast	Nasz nowy dom				movies / other								
Thursday	Wydarzenia			Gość Wydarzeń	sports news and weather forecast	Nasz nowy dom				Przyjaciółki					movies / other			
Friday	Wydarzenia			Gość Wydarzeń	sports news and weather forecast	Twoja twarz brzmi znajomo. Najlepsi!									Bracia			
Saturday	Wydarzenia		Prezydenci i premierzy		sports news and weather forecast	movies / other												
Sunday	Wydarzenia		sports news and weather forecast	Państwo w państwie		Dancing with the Stars. Taniec z gwiazdami									Planeta singli. Osiem historii			

=== Spring 2024 early fringe schedule ===
PM	1:45	2:00	2:15	2:30	2:45	3:00	3:15	3:30	3:45	4:00	4:15	4:30	4:45	5:00	5:15	5:30	5:45	6:00	6:15	6:30
Monday	Trudne sprawy				Dlaczego ja?				Wydarzenia and weather forecast		Interwencja	Na ratunek 112		Gliniarze				Pierwsza miłość		
Tuesday	Trudne sprawy				Dlaczego ja?				Wydarzenia and weather forecast		Interwencja	Na ratunek 112		Gliniarze				Pierwsza miłość		
Wednesday	Trudne sprawy				Dlaczego ja?				Wydarzenia and weather forecast		Interwencja	Na ratunek 112		Gliniarze				Pierwsza miłość		
Thursday	Trudne sprawy				Dlaczego ja?				Wydarzenia and weather forecast		Interwencja	Na ratunek 112		Gliniarze				Pierwsza miłość		
Friday	Trudne sprawy				Dlaczego ja?				Wydarzenia and weather forecast		Interwencja	Na ratunek 112		Gliniarze				Pierwsza miłość		

== Fall 2023 ==
=== Fall 2023 primetime (initial) schedule ===
PM	6:45	7:00	7:15	7:30	7:45	8:00	8:15	8:30	8:45	9:00	9:15	9:30	9:45	10:00	10:15	10:30	10:45	11:00
Monday	Wydarzenia			Gość Wydarzeń	sports news and weather forecast	Doda. Dream Show				MEGAHIT (movies)								
Tuesday	Wydarzenia			Gość Wydarzeń	sports news and weather forecast	Ninja Warrior Polska								movies / other				
Wednesday	Wydarzenia			Gość Wydarzeń	sports news and weather forecast	The Real Housewives. Żony Warszawy				Temptation Island Polska				movies / other				
Thursday	Wydarzenia			Gość Wydarzeń	sports news and weather forecast	Nasz nowy dom				Przyjaciółki				movies / other				
Friday	Wydarzenia			Gość Wydarzeń	sports news and weather forecast	Twoja twarz brzmi znajomo								movies / other				
Saturday	Wydarzenia		Prezydenci i premierzy		sports news and weather forecast	movies / other								movies / other				
Sunday	Wydarzenia		sports news and weather forecast	Państwo w państwie		Kabaret na żywo. Młodzi i Moralni 3									Teściowie		Teściowie	

At the end of September, due to very low audience figures, The Real Housewives. Żony Warszawy and Temptation Island Polska were moved to later time slots (10:15 PM and 11:15 PM respectively).

In mid-October, Polsat suspended the broadcast of Kabaret na żywo. Młodzi i Moralni. Also at that time some of the series have come to an end.

=== Fall 2023 early fringe schedule ===
PM	1:45	2:00	2:15	2:30	2:45	3:00	3:15	3:30	3:45	4:00	4:15	4:30	4:45	5:00	5:15	5:30	5:45	6:00	6:15	6:30
Monday	Trudne sprawy				Dlaczego ja?				Wydarzenia and weather forecast		Interwencja	Na ratunek 112		Gliniarze				Pierwsza miłość		
Tuesday	Trudne sprawy				Dlaczego ja?				Wydarzenia and weather forecast		Interwencja	Na ratunek 112		Gliniarze				Pierwsza miłość		
Wednesday	Trudne sprawy				Dlaczego ja?				Wydarzenia and weather forecast		Interwencja	Na ratunek 112		Gliniarze				Pierwsza miłość		
Thursday	Trudne sprawy				Dlaczego ja?				Wydarzenia and weather forecast		Interwencja	Na ratunek 112		Gliniarze				Pierwsza miłość		
Friday	Trudne sprawy				Dlaczego ja?				Wydarzenia and weather forecast		Interwencja	Na ratunek 112		Gliniarze				Pierwsza miłość		

== Fall 2012 ==
PM	6:00	6:50	7:30	8:00	8:30	9:00	9:30	10:00	10:30	11:00	11:30
Monday	Pierwsza miłość	Wydarzenia sport weather forecast	Świat według Kiepskich (R)	movie of a series "MEGA HIT"				movie			
Tuesday	Pierwsza miłość	Wydarzenia sport weather forecast	Świat według Kiepskich (R)	movie				CSI: Miami (R)		CSI: Miami (R)	
Wednesday	Pierwsza miłość	Wydarzenia sport weather forecast	Świat według Kiepskich (R)	Świat według Kiepskich	comedy				comedy		
Thursday	Pierwsza miłość	Wydarzenia sport weather forecast	Świat według Kiepskich (R)	CSI: Miami		Hotel 52		Przyjaciółki		Pamiętniki z wakacji (R)	
Friday	Pierwsza miłość	Wydarzenia sport weather forecast	Świat według Kiepskich (R)	Got to Dance. Tylko taniec				movie			
Saturday	Nieprawdopodobne, a jednak... (airing from 6:15)	Wydarzenia sport weather forecast	Świat według Kiepskich (R)	movie				movie			
Sunday	Przyjaciółki (R) (airing from 5:45)	Wydarzenia sport weather forecast	Państwo w państwie	Must Be the Music. Tylko muzyka				Bones		The Listener	

== 2011–12 ==
New programs in primetime:

Fall:

- Pamiętniki z wakacji
- Państwo w państwie

Winter:

- The Listener

Spring:

- Got to Dance. Tylko taniec
- Breaking Bad

Summer:

- Greatest American Dog

PM		6:00	6:50	7:30	8:00	8:30	9:00	9:30	10:00	10:30	11:00	11:30
Monday	Fall	Pierwsza miłość	Wydarzenia sport weather forecast	Linia życia	movie of a series "MEGA HIT"				movie			
Monday	Winter	Pierwsza miłość	Wydarzenia sport weather forecast	Świat według Kiepskich (R)	movie of a series "MEGA HIT"				movie			
Monday	Spring	Pierwsza miłość	Wydarzenia sport weather forecast	Świat według Kiepskich (R)	movie of a series "MEGA HIT"				movie			
Monday	Summer	Trudne sprawy (R)	Wydarzenia sport weather forecast	Świat według Kiepskich (R)	movie of a series "MEGA HIT"				movie			
Tuesday	Fall	Pierwsza miłość	Wydarzenia sport weather forecast	Linia życia	movie				CSI: NY		movie	
Tuesday	Winter	Pierwsza miłość	Wydarzenia sport weather forecast	Świat według Kiepskich (R)	movie				CSI: NY		movie	
Tuesday	Spring	Pierwsza miłość	Wydarzenia sport weather forecast	Świat według Kiepskich (R)	movie				CSI: NY		movie	
Tuesday	Summer	Trudne sprawy (R)	Wydarzenia sport weather forecast	Świat według Kiepskich (R)	movie				CSI: NY		CSI: NY	
Wednesday	Fall	Pierwsza miłość	Wydarzenia sport weather forecast	Linia życia	Świat według Kiepskich	comedy or UEFA Champions League				comedy		
Wednesday	Winter	Pierwsza miłość	Wydarzenia sport weather forecast	Świat według Kiepskich (R)	Świat według Kiepskich (R)	comedy or UEFA Champions League				comedy		
Wednesday	Spring	Pierwsza miłość	Wydarzenia sport weather forecast	Świat według Kiepskich (R)	Świat według Kiepskich	comedy or UEFA Champions League				comedy		
Wednesday	Summer	Trudne sprawy (R)	Wydarzenia sport weather forecast	Świat według Kiepskich (R)	Świat według Kiepskich (R)	comedy				comedy		
Thursday	Fall	Pierwsza miłość	Wydarzenia sport weather forecast	Linia życia	Ludzie Chudego		Hotel 52		Szpilki na Giewoncie		Bones (R)	
Thursday	Winter	Pierwsza miłość	Wydarzenia sport weather forecast	Świat według Kiepskich (R)	CSI: NY		movie				movie	
Thursday	Spring	Pierwsza miłość	Wydarzenia sport weather forecast	Świat według Kiepskich (R)	CSI: NY		Hotel 52		Szpilki na Giewoncie		Bones (R)	
Thursday	Summer	Trudne sprawy (R)	Wydarzenia sport weather forecast	Świat według Kiepskich (R)	movie				Pamiętniki z wakacji (R)		Pamiętniki z wakacji (R)	
Friday	Fall	Pierwsza miłość	Wydarzenia sport weather forecast	Linia życia	movie				movie			
Friday	Winter	Pierwsza miłość	Wydarzenia sport weather forecast	Świat według Kiepskich (R)	movie				movie			
Friday	Spring	Pierwsza miłość	Wydarzenia sport weather forecast	Świat według Kiepskich (R)	Got to Dance. Tylko taniec				movie			
Friday	Summer	Trudne sprawy (R)	Wydarzenia sport weather forecast	Świat według Kiepskich (R)	movie				movie			
Saturday	Fall	Pamiętniki z wakacji	Wydarzenia sport weather forecast	Daleko od noszy	movie				movie			
Saturday	Winter	Pamiętniki z wakacji (R)	Wydarzenia sport weather forecast	Świat według Kiepskich (R)	movie				movie			
Saturday	Spring	Pamiętniki z wakacji	Wydarzenia sport weather forecast	Świat według Kiepskich (R)	movie				movie			
Saturday	Summer	Greatest American Dog	Wydarzenia sport weather forecast	Świat według Kiepskich (R)	movie				movie			
Sunday	Fall	Pamiętniki z wakacji	Wydarzenia sport weather forecast	Państwo w państwie	Must Be the Music. Tylko muzyka				Bones		movie	
Sunday	Winter	Pamiętniki z wakacji (R)	Wydarzenia sport weather forecast	Państwo w państwie	CSI: Miami		CSI: Miami		Bones		The Listener	
Sunday	Spring	Pamiętniki z wakacji	Wydarzenia sport weather forecast	Państwo w państwie	Must Be the Music. Tylko muzyka				Bones / Breaking Bad		movie	
Sunday	Summer	Greatest American Dog	Wydarzenia sport weather forecast	Świat według Kiepskich (R)	CSI: Miami		CSI: NY		Bones		The Listener	

== 2010–11 ==
New programs in primetime:

Fall:

- Szpilki na Giewoncie
- Stand up. Zabij mnie śmiechem
- Ludzie Chudego

Winter:

- 7420. Milion od zaraz
- Killer Instinct

Spring:

- Linia życia
- Women's Murder Club
- Must Be the Music. Tylko muzyka

Summer:

- New Amsterdam

PM		6:00	6:50	7:30	8:00	8:30	9:00	9:30	10:00	10:30	11:00	11:30
Monday	Fall	Pierwsza miłość	Wydarzenia sport weather forecast	Samo życie	movie of a series "MEGA HIT"				movie			
Monday	Winter	Pierwsza miłość	Wydarzenia sport weather forecast	Świat według Kiepskich (R)	movie of a series "MEGA HIT"				movie			
Monday	Spring	Pierwsza miłość	Wydarzenia sport weather forecast	Linia życia	movie of a series "MEGA HIT"				movie			
Monday	Summer	Trudne sprawy (R)	Wydarzenia sport weather forecast	Świat według Kiepskich (R)	movie of a series "MEGA HIT"				movie			
Tuesday	Fall	Pierwsza miłość	Wydarzenia sport weather forecast	Samo życie	movie				CSI: Miami		CSI: Miami	
Tuesday	Winter	Pierwsza miłość	Wydarzenia sport weather forecast	Świat według Kiepskich (R)	movie				CSI: NY (R)		Hotel 52 (R)	
Tuesday	Spring	Pierwsza miłość	Wydarzenia sport weather forecast	Linia życia	movie				CSI: NY (R)		movie	
Tuesday	Summer	Trudne sprawy (R)	Wydarzenia sport weather forecast	Świat według Kiepskich (R)	movie				CSI: NY (R)		movie	
Wednesday	Fall	Pierwsza miłość	Wydarzenia sport weather forecast	Samo życie	Świat według Kiepskich	comedy or UEFA Champions League				comedy		
Wednesday	Winter	Pierwsza miłość	Wydarzenia sport weather forecast	Świat według Kiepskich (R)	Świat według Kiepskich (R)	comedy or UEFA Champions League				Kabareton na TOPie		comedy
Wednesday	Spring	Pierwsza miłość	Wydarzenia sport weather forecast	Linia życia	Świat według Kiepskich	comedy or UEFA Champions League				comedy		
Wednesday	Summer	Trudne sprawy (R)	Wydarzenia sport weather forecast	Świat według Kiepskich (R)	Świat według Kiepskich (R)	comedy or UEFA Champions League				comedy		
Thursday	Fall	Pierwsza miłość	Wydarzenia sport weather forecast	Samo życie	CSI: NY		Hotel 52		Szpilki na Giewoncie		movie	
Thursday	Winter	Pierwsza miłość	Wydarzenia sport weather forecast	Świat według Kiepskich (R)	CSI: NY		movie				Szpilki na Giewoncie (R)	
Thursday	Spring	Pierwsza miłość	Wydarzenia sport weather forecast	Linia życia	CSI: NY		Hotel 52		Szpilki na Giewoncie		Women's Murder Club	
Thursday	Summer	Trudne sprawy (R)	Wydarzenia sport weather forecast	Świat według Kiepskich (R)	movie				movie			
Friday	Fall	Pierwsza miłość	Wydarzenia sport weather forecast	Samo życie	movie				movie			
Friday	Winter	Pierwsza miłość	Wydarzenia sport weather forecast	Świat według Kiepskich (R)	movie				movie			
Friday	Spring	Pierwsza miłość	Wydarzenia sport weather forecast	Linia życia	movie				movie			
Friday	Summer	Trudne sprawy (R)	Wydarzenia sport weather forecast	Świat według Kiepskich (R)	movie				movie			
Saturday	Fall	Światowe rekordy Guinesssa	Wydarzenia sport weather forecast	Daleko od noszy	Stand up. Zabij mnie śmiechem				movie			
Saturday	Winter	Światowe rekordy Guinesssa (R)	Wydarzenia sport weather forecast	Świat według Kiepskich (R)	Ludzie Chudego (R)		Ludzie Chudego (R)		movie			
Saturday	Spring	Merlin	Wydarzenia sport weather forecast	Daleko od noszy	Must Be the Music. Tylko muzyka				movie			
Saturday	Summer	Mamuśki (R)	Wydarzenia sport weather forecast	Świat według Kiepskich (R)	movie				movie			
Sunday	Fall	Hotel 52 (R)	Wydarzenia sport weather forecast	Świat według Kiepskich (R)	Ludzie Chudego		CSI: Miami		Bones		movie	
Sunday	Winter	7420. Milion od zaraz	Wydarzenia sport weather forecast	Świat według Kiepskich (R)	CSI: Miami (R)		CSI: Miami (R)		Bones (R)		Killer Instinct	
Sunday	Spring	Hotel 52 (R)	Wydarzenia sport weather forecast	Świat według Kiepskich (R)	CSI: Miami		Bones		Bones		movie	
Sunday	Summer	Must Be the Music. Tylko muzyka (R) (airing from 5:15)	Wydarzenia sport weather forecast	Świat według Kiepskich (R)	Ludzie Chudego (R)		CSI: Miami (R)		Bones (R)		New Amsterdam	

== 2009–10 ==
New programs in primetime:

Fall:

- UEFA Champions League
- Synowie, czyli po moim trupie
- Skorumpowani
- Światowe rekordy Guinessa

Winter:

- Kidnapped
- Journeyman
- War and Peace
- The Beast
- Damages

Spring:

- Hotel 52
- Przeznaczenie
- Tylko nas dwoje. Just the Two of Us
- Zabić z miłości

Summer:

- Boston Legal

PM		6:00	6:50	7:30	8:00	8:30	9:00	9:30	10:00	10:30	11:00	11:30
Monday	Fall	Pierwsza miłość	Wydarzenia sport weather forecast	Samo życie	movie of a series "MEGA HIT"				movie			
Monday	Winter	Pierwsza miłość	Wydarzenia sport weather forecast	Samo życie	movie of a series "MEGA HIT"				movie			
Monday	Spring	Pierwsza miłość	Wydarzenia sport weather forecast	Samo życie	movie of a series "MEGA HIT"				movie			
Monday	Summer	Miodowe lata (R)	Wydarzenia sport weather forecast	Świat według Kiepskich (R)	movie of a series "MEGA HIT"				movie			
Tuesday	Fall	Pierwsza miłość	Wydarzenia sport weather forecast	Samo życie	movie				CSI: Miami (R)		CSI: Miami (R)	
Tuesday	Winter	Pierwsza miłość	Wydarzenia sport weather forecast	Samo życie	movie				CSI: Miami (R)		CSI: Miami (R)	
Tuesday	Spring	Pierwsza miłość	Wydarzenia sport weather forecast	Samo życie	movie				CSI: Miami (R)		CSI: Miami (R)	
Tuesday	Summer	Miodowe lata (R)	Wydarzenia sport weather forecast	Świat według Kiepskich (R)	movie				CSI: NY (R)		movie	
Wednesday	Fall	Pierwsza miłość	Wydarzenia sport weather forecast	Samo życie	Świat według Kiepskich	comedy or UEFA Champions League				comedy		
Wednesday	Winter	Pierwsza miłość	Wydarzenia sport weather forecast	Samo życie	Świat według Kiepskich (R)	comedy or UEFA Champions League				comedy		
Wednesday	Spring	Pierwsza miłość	Wydarzenia sport weather forecast	Samo życie	Świat według Kiepskich	comedy or UEFA Champions League				comedy		
Wednesday	Summer	Miodowe lata (R)	Wydarzenia sport weather forecast	Świat według Kiepskich (R)	comedy				comedy			
Thursday	Fall	Pierwsza miłość	Wydarzenia sport weather forecast	Samo życie	CSI: NY		movie				Desperate Housewives (R)	
Thursday	Winter	Pierwsza miłość	Wydarzenia sport weather forecast	Samo życie	CSI: NY		Kidnapped		Kidnapped		movie	
Thursday	Spring	Pierwsza miłość	Wydarzenia sport weather forecast	Samo życie	CSI: NY		Hotel 52		Moment prawdy		Przeznaczenie	
Thursday	Summer	Miodowe lata (R)	Wydarzenia sport weather forecast	Świat według Kiepskich (R)	movie				movie			
Friday	Fall	Pierwsza miłość	Wydarzenia sport weather forecast	Synowie, czyli po moim trupie!	movie				Skorumpowani		Skorumpowani	
Friday	Winter	Pierwsza miłość	Wydarzenia sport weather forecast	Samo życie	movie				movie			
Friday	Spring	Pierwsza miłość	Wydarzenia sport weather forecast	Samo życie	movie				movie			
Friday	Summer	Miodowe lata (R)	Wydarzenia sport weather forecast	Świat według Kiepskich (R)	movie				movie			
Saturday	Fall	Światowe rekordy Guinesssa	Wydarzenia sport weather forecast	13 Posterunek (R)	Jak oni śpiewają					Desperate Housewives		Desperate Housewives
Saturday	Winter	Journeyman	Wydarzenia sport weather forecast	13 Posterunek (R)	movie				movie			
Saturday	Spring	Numbers	Wydarzenia sport weather forecast	Daleko od noszy	Tylko nas dwoje. Just the Two of Us				movie			
Saturday	Summer	Boston Legal	Wydarzenia sport weather forecast	Świat według Kiepskich (R)	Kabareton na TOPie		Kabareton na TOPie		Hotel 52 (R)		movie	
Sunday	Fall	Rodzina zastępcza	Wydarzenia sport weather forecast	13 Posterunek (R)	Prison Break		CSI: Miami		Bones		movie	
Sunday	Winter	War and Peace	Wydarzenia sport weather forecast	13 Posterunek (R)	The Beast		Bones		Damages		movie	
Sunday	Spring	Hotel 52 (R)	Wydarzenia sport weather forecast	Zabić z miłości	Prison Break		CSI: Miami		Bones		movie	
Sunday	Summer	Kabareton na TOPie	Wydarzenia sport weather forecast	Świat według Kiepskich (R)	CSI: Miami (R)		Numb3rs		Bones		Desperate Housewives	

== 2008–09 ==
New programs in primetime:

Fall:

- Agentki
- Na kocią łapę
- Piotr Bałtroczyk na żywo
- Fabryka Gwiazd
- Ranking gwiazd

Spring:

- Moment prawdy
- Synowie

PM		6:00	6:50	7:30	8:00	8:30	9:00	9:30	10:00	10:30	11:00	11:30
Monday	Fall	Pierwsza miłość	Wydarzenia sport weather forecast	Samo życie	movie of a series "MEGA HIT"				movie			
Monday	Winter	Pierwsza miłość	Wydarzenia sport weather forecast	Samo życie	movie of a series "MEGA HIT"				movie			
Monday	Spring	Pierwsza miłość	Wydarzenia sport weather forecast	Samo życie	movie of a series "MEGA HIT"				movie			
Monday	Summer	ER	Wydarzenia sport weather forecast	Malanowski i partnerzy (R)	movie of a series "MEGA HIT"				movie			
Tuesday	Fall	Pierwsza miłość	Wydarzenia sport weather forecast	Samo życie	movie				movie			
Tuesday	Winter	Pierwsza miłość	Wydarzenia sport weather forecast	Samo życie	movie				CSI: Miami (R)		CSI: Miami (R)	
Tuesday	Spring	Pierwsza miłość	Wydarzenia sport weather forecast	Samo życie	movie				CSI: Miami (R)		CSI: Miami (R)	
Tuesday	Summer	ER	Wydarzenia sport weather forecast	Malanowski i partnerzy (R)	movie				CSI: Miami (R)		CSI: Miami (R)	
Wednesday	Fall	Pierwsza miłość	Wydarzenia sport weather forecast	Samo życie	Świat według Kiepskich	Agentki		comedy				Daleko od noszy
Wednesday	Winter	Pierwsza miłość	Wydarzenia sport weather forecast	Samo życie	Świat według Kiepskich (R)	Świat według Kiepskich (R)	comedy				comedy	
Wednesday	Spring	Pierwsza miłość	Wydarzenia sport weather forecast	Samo życie	Świat według Kiepskich (R)	Świat według Kiepskich (R)	comedy				Najśmieszniejsze momenty świata (R)	
Wednesday	Summer	ER	Wydarzenia sport weather forecast	Malanowski i partnerzy (R)	Świat według Kiepskich (R)	Świat według Kiepskich (R)	comedy				Halo, Hans! (R)/comedy	
Thursday	Fall	Pierwsza miłość	Wydarzenia sport weather forecast	Na kocią łapę	Tylko miłość		Piotr Bałtroczyk na żywo			Desperate Housewives		Dorota Gawryluk - konfrontacje
Thursday	Winter	Pierwsza miłość	Wydarzenia sport weather forecast	Samo życie	CSI: NY		Numb3rs		Desperate Housewives		Dorota Gawryluk - konfrontacje	
Thursday	Spring	Pierwsza miłość	Wydarzenia sport weather forecast	Samo życie	CSI: NY		Moment prawdy		Tylko miłość		The X-Files	
Thursday	Summer	ER	Wydarzenia sport weather forecast	Malanowski i partnerzy (R)	CSI: NY		Moment prawdy (R)		Desperate Housewives		Desperate Housewives	
Friday	Fall	Pierwsza miłość	Wydarzenia sport weather forecast	Na kocią łapę	Fabryka Gwiazd				movie			
Friday	Winter	Pierwsza miłość	Wydarzenia sport weather forecast	Samo życie	movie				movie			
Friday	Spring	Pierwsza miłość	Wydarzenia sport weather forecast	Samo życie	movie				movie			
Friday	Summer	ER	Wydarzenia sport weather forecast	Malanowski i partnerzy (R)	movie				movie			
Saturday	Fall	Agentki (R)	Wydarzenia sport weather forecast	Ranking gwiazd	Jak oni śpiewają					movie		
Saturday	Winter	music/cabaret	Wydarzenia sport weather forecast	I kto tu rządzi? (R)	movie				movie			
Saturday	Spring	Synowie	Wydarzenia sport weather forecast	Shaggy & Scooby-Doo Get a Clue!	Jak oni śpiewają					movie		
Saturday	Summer	movie (airing from 4:45)	Wydarzenia sport weather forecast	Malanowski i partnerzy (R)	movie				movie			
Sunday	Fall	Rodzina zastępcza	Wydarzenia sport weather forecast	Ranking gwiazd	Prison Break		CSI: Miami		Bones		movie	
Sunday	Winter	Agentki (R)	Wydarzenia sport weather forecast	I kto tu rządzi? (R)	CSI: Miami (R)		Numb3rs		movie			
Sunday	Spring	Rodzina zastępcza	Wydarzenia sport weather forecast	Shaggy & Scooby-Doo Get a Clue!	CSI: Miami		Numb3rs		Bones		movie	
Sunday	Summer	Rodzina zastępcza (R)	Wydarzenia sport weather forecast	Malanowski i partnerzy (R)	CSI: NY		Numb3rs		24		24	

== 2007–08 ==
New programs in primetime:

Fall:

- Tylko miłość
- Ekipa
- Dzień kangura

Winter:

- Runaway
- Halo, Hans!

Spring:

- 3 lbs
- Gwiezdny cyrk
- Strzał w 10
- Bones
- Misiek Koterski Show
- Dorota Gawryluk - konfrontacje

Summer:

- Spadkobiercy
- Numb3rs

PM		6:00	6:50	7:30	8:00	8:30	9:00	9:30	10:00	10:30	11:00	11:30
Monday	Fall	Pierwsza miłość	Wydarzenia sport weather forecast	Samo życie	The X-Files		movie of a series "MEGA HIT"				Fear Factor	
Monday	Winter	Pierwsza miłość	Wydarzenia sport weather forecast	Samo życie	The X-Files / Runaway		movie of a series "MEGA HIT"				Fear Factor	
Monday	Spring	Pierwsza miłość	Wydarzenia sport weather forecast	Samo życie	Piotr Bałtroczyk przedstawia (R) / Misiek Koterski Show (R)		movie of a series "MEGA HIT"				Strzał w 10 (R)	
Monday	Summer	Miodowe lata (R)	Wydarzenia sport weather forecast	Mamuśki (R)	CSI: NY		movie of a series "MEGA HIT"				Fear Factor	
Tuesday	Fall	Pierwsza miłość	Wydarzenia sport weather forecast	Samo życie	CSI: Miami		movie				Grey's Anatomy	
Tuesday	Winter	Pierwsza miłość	Wydarzenia sport weather forecast	Samo życie	Piotr Bałtroczyk przedstawia (R) / Runaway		movie				Grey's Anatomy	
Tuesday	Spring	Pierwsza miłość	Wydarzenia sport weather forecast	Samo życie	CSI: NY		movie				Grey's Anatomy / 3 lbs	
Tuesday	Summer	Miodowe lata (R)	Wydarzenia sport weather forecast	Mamuśki (R)	CSI: NY		movie				Fear Factor	
Wednesday	Fall	Pierwsza miłość	Wydarzenia sport weather forecast	Samo życie	I kto tu rządzi?	Świat według Kiepskich	comedy				comedy	
Wednesday	Winter	Pierwsza miłość	Wydarzenia sport weather forecast	Samo życie	Świat według Kiepskich (R)	Świat według Kiepskich (R)	comedy				comedy	
Wednesday	Spring	Pierwsza miłość	Wydarzenia sport weather forecast	Samo życie	I kto tu rządzi?	Świat według Kiepskich	comedy				comedy	
Wednesday	Summer	Miodowe lata (R)	Wydarzenia sport weather forecast	Mamuśki (R)	Świat według Kiepskich (R)	Świat według Kiepskich (R)	comedy				Misiek Koterski Show (R)	
Thursday	Fall	Pierwsza miłość	Wydarzenia sport weather forecast	Samo życie	Tylko miłość		Ekipa / Fala zbrodni		Co z tą Polską? / Ekipa		CSI: NY	
Thursday	Winter	Pierwsza miłość	Wydarzenia sport weather forecast	Samo życie	Tylko miłość		Fala zbrodni		CSI: NY		movie	
Thursday	Spring	Pierwsza miłość	Wydarzenia sport weather forecast	Samo życie	Tylko miłość		Gwiezdny cyrk				movie / Dorota Gawryluk - konfrontacje	
Thursday	Summer	Miodowe lata (R)	Wydarzenia sport weather forecast	Mamuśki (R)	Prison Break (R)		Prison Break (R)		movie			
Friday	Fall	Pierwsza miłość	Wydarzenia sport weather forecast	Samo życie	movie				movie			
Friday	Winter	Pierwsza miłość	Wydarzenia sport weather forecast	Samo życie	movie				movie			
Friday	Spring	Pierwsza miłość	Wydarzenia sport weather forecast	Samo życie	movie				movie			
Friday	Summer	Miodowe lata (R)	Wydarzenia sport weather forecast	Mamuśki (R)	movie				movie			
Saturday	Fall	Dzień kangura	Wydarzenia sport weather forecast	Mamuśki	Jak oni śpiewają					movie		
Saturday	Winter	movie (airing from 4:45)	Wydarzenia sport weather forecast	Miodowe lata (R)	movie				Halo, Hans!		movie	
Saturday	Spring	Strzał w 10	Wydarzenia sport weather forecast	Mr. Bean	Jak oni śpiewają					Piotr Bałtroczyk przedstawia		movie
Saturday	Summer	Rodzina zastępcza (R)	Wydarzenia sport weather forecast	Spadkobiercy	movie				movie			
Sunday	Fall	Rodzina zastępcza	Wydarzenia sport weather forecast	Daleko od noszy	Prison Break		Prison Break		Desperate Housewives		Desperate Housewives	
Sunday	Winter	Rodzina zastępcza	Wydarzenia sport weather forecast	Miodowe lata (R)	CSI: Miami		CSI: Miami		movie			
Sunday	Spring	Rodzina zastępcza	Wydarzenia sport weather forecast	Daleko od noszy	CSI: Miami		CSI: Miami		Bones		Misiek Koterski Show	
Sunday	Summer	Rodzina zastępcza (R)	Wydarzenia sport weather forecast	Spadkobiercy	CSI: NY		Numb3rs		Bones		movie	

== See also ==
- Polsat
- List of programmes broadcast by Polsat
