= Miss Polski 2014 =

25th Miss Polski pageant

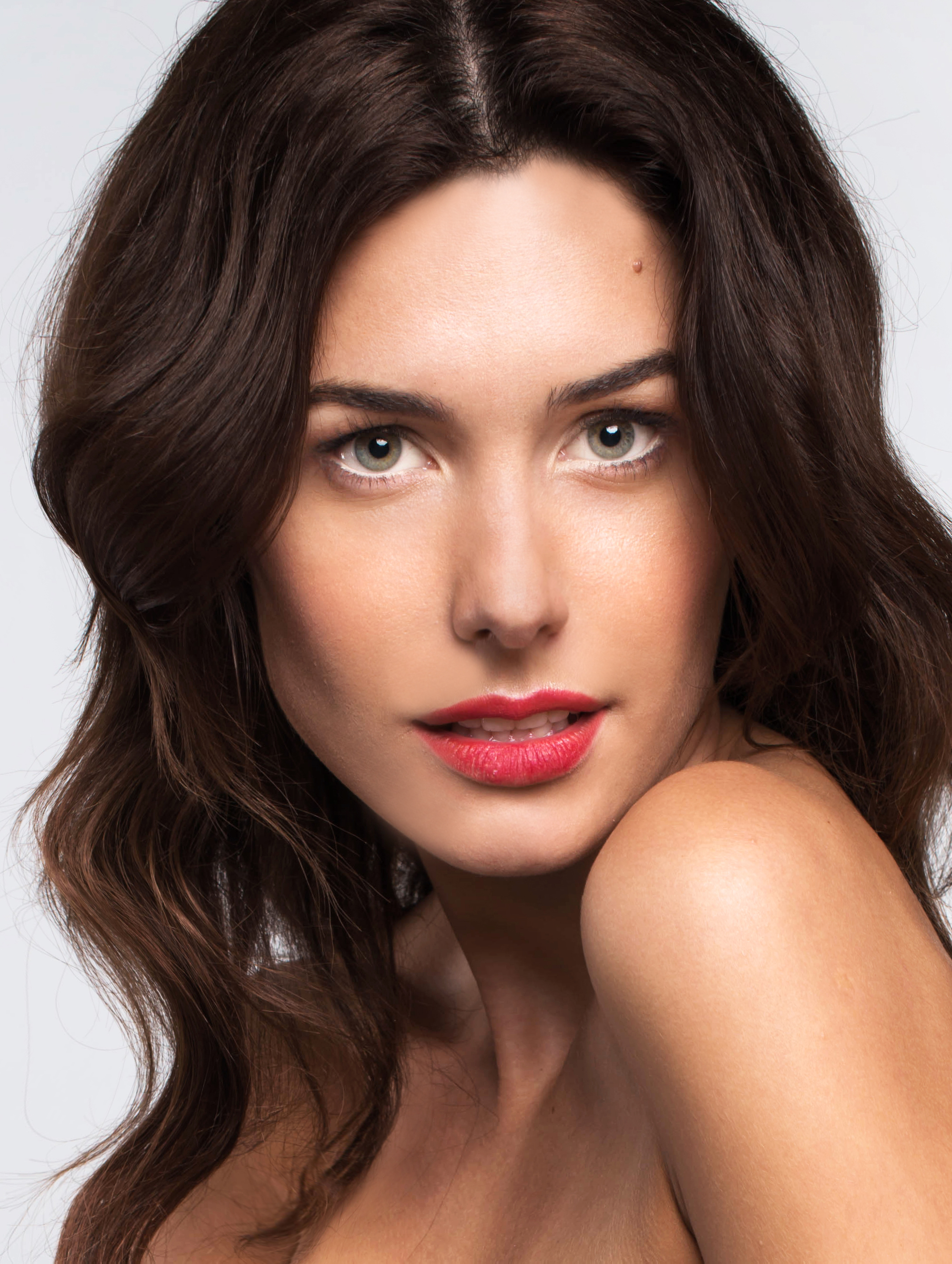
- Ewa Mielnicka, Miss Polski 2014
- Date: December 7, 2014
- Presenters: Paulina Sykut-Jeżyna; Zygmunt Chajzer; Agnieszka Popielewicz; Krzysztof Ibisz
- Entertainment: Stanisław Karpiel-Bułecka; Future Folk; Marek Kaliszuk; Tomasz Szczepaniak; Piotr Cugowski
- Venue: Municipal Sports and Recreation Center (MOSIR), Krynica-Zdrój
- Broadcaster: Polsat
- Entrants: 25
- Placements: 10
- Withdrawals: Lesser Poland; Opole
- Returns: Holy Cross; Lublin; Lubusz; Masovia; West Pomerania
- Winner: Ewa Mielnicka; Masovia

Miss Polski 2014 was the 25th Miss Polski pageant, held on December 7, 2014. The winner was Ewa Mielnicka of Masovia. Mielnicka represented Poland in both Miss International 2015 and Miss Supranational 2016.

== Finalists ==
Represents	Candidate	Age	Height
Greater Poland	Maja Nizio	21	173 cm (5 ft 8 in)
Greater Poland	Weronika Marzęda	20	169 cm (5 ft 6.5 in)
Holy Cross	Amanda Słomińska	22	180 cm (5 ft 11 in)
Kuyavia-Pomerania	Agnieszka Wasilewska	22	176 cm (5 ft 9 in)
Kuyavia-Pomerania	Sandra Muzalewska	22	170 cm (5 ft 7 in)
Łódź	Ilona Krawczyńska	22	175 cm (5 ft 9 in)
Lublin	Anna Stebnowska	22	169 cm (5 ft 6.5 in)
Lubusz	Sandra Wieczorek	19	171 cm (5 ft 7 in)
Lower Silesia	Emilia Chrulenko	22	180 cm (5 ft 11 in)
Masovia	Ewa Mielnicka	22	180 cm (5 ft 11 in)
Masovia	Klaudia Lawrenc	19	171 cm (5 ft 7 in)
Masovia	Martyna Górak	19	176 (5 ft 9 in)
Masovia	Urszula Dąbrowska	19	177 cm (5 ft 9.5 in)
Podlasie	Justyna Galas	19	173 cm (5 ft 8 in)
Pomerania	Karolina Labuda	24	170 cm (5 ft 7 in)
Pomerania	Klaudia Kopieniak	18	177 cm (5 ft 9.5 in)
Pomerania	Marta Gockowska	22	174 cm (5 ft 8.5 in)
Pomerania	Weronika Kuczun	19	170 cm (5 ft 7 in)
Silesia	Karolina Trepka	19	182 cm (5 ft 11.5 in)
Silesia	Magdalena Szczepańska	19	175 cm (5 ft 9 in)
Silesia	Małgorzata Habdas	22	173 cm (5 ft 8 in)
Silesia	Sandra Jędruszek	21	172 cm (5 ft 7.5 in)
Warmia-Masuria	Katarzyna Gajewska	22	175 cm (5 ft 9 in)
West Pomerania	Kamila Wasilewska	19	177 cm (5 ft 9.5 cm)
Natalia Łukaszewska	19	176 cm (5 ft 9 in)	
