= Miss Polski 2016 =

27th Miss Polski pageant

- Date: December 4, 2016
- Presenters: Agnieszka Popielewicz; Krzysztof Ibisz
- Entertainment: Natalia Szroeder; Grzegorz Hyży; Tomasz Barański; Rafał Maserak
- Venue: Municipal Sports and Recreation Center (MOSIR), Krynica-Zdrój
- Broadcaster: Polsat
- Entrants: 24
- Placements: 10
- Withdrawals: Greater Poland; Lesser Poland; Lower Silesia
- Returns: Lubusz; Opole; Subcarpathia
- Winner: Paulina Maziarz; Masovia

Miss Polski 2016 was the 27th Miss Polski pageant, held on December 4, 2016. The winner was Paulina Maziarz of Masovia. Maziarz represented Poland in Miss International 2017 and Miss Supranational 2017.
