= Miss Polski 2015 =

26th Miss Polski pageant

- Date: 6 December 2015
- Presenters: Paulina Sykut-Jeżyna; Krzysztof Ibisz
- Entertainment: Ewelina Lisowska; Sławek Uniatowski; Tomasz Barański; Janja Lesar
- Venue: Municipal Sports and Recreation Center (MOSIR), Krynica-Zdrój
- Broadcaster: Polsat
- Entrants: 31
- Placements: 15
- Withdrawals: Lubusz
- Returns: Lesser Poland
- Winner: Magdalena Bieńkowska; Warmia-Masuria

Miss Polski 2015 was the 26th Miss Polski pageant, held on 6 December 2015. The winner was Magdalena Bieńkowska of Warmia-Masuria. Bieńkowska represented Poland in Miss International 2016, Miss World 2017 & Miss Supranational 2018. 1st Runner-Up Marta Redo represented the country at Miss Grand International 2016.

== Final results ==
Final results	Contestant
Miss Polski 2015; Miss International Poland 2016; Miss World Poland 2017; Miss Supranational Poland 2018	Warmia-Masuria – Magdalena Bieńkowska
1st Runner-Up; Miss Grand Poland 2016	Podlasie – Marta Redo
2nd Runner-Up	Masovia – Marta Bieniek
3rd Runner-Up	Masovia – Sabina Kontor
4th Runner-Up	Kuyavia-Pomerania – Joanna Tlałka
Top 15	Greater Poland – Aleksandra Olszewska; Greater Poland – Klaudia Strojwąs; Łódź – Aleksandra Adamczyk; Łódź – Angelika Stepien; Lower Silesia – Weronika Diesner; Lublin – Aleksandra Trykacz; Pomerania – Kamila Wenderlich; Silesia – Joanna Jochemczyk; Silesia – Magdalena Wesołowska; West Pomerania – Karina Praise
