= Miss Polski 2010 =

Beauty pageant

- Date: August 29, 2010
- Presenters: Maciej Dowbor; Maciej Rock; Krzysztof Ibisz; Tomasz Kammel
- Entertainment: Kombi; Lidia Kopania; Marcin Mroziński; Michał Wiśniewski
- Venue: Amphitheater, Płock
- Broadcaster: Polsat
- Entrants: 24
- Placements: 10
- Withdrawals: Greater Poland
- Returns: Lublin
- Winner: Agata Szewioła; Lubusz

Miss Polski 2010 was the 21st Miss Polski pageant, held on August 29, 2010. The winner was Agata Szewioła of Lubusz. In addition to receiving the title Szewioła also received a Renault Clio. Szewioła represented Poland in Miss World 2010.

== Finalists ==
Represents	Candidate	Age	Height
Holy Cross	Jowita Basińska	19	174 cm (5 ft 8.5 in)
Kuyavia-Pomerania	Julita Więckowska	20	174 cm (5 ft 8.5 in)
Łódź	Marta Kaczmarczyk	24	179 cm (5 ft 10.5 in)
Lower Silesia	Anna Lenarcik	19	177 cm (5 ft 9.5 in)
Lower Silesia	Anna Wierzbicka	18	177 cm (5 ft 9.5 in)
Lower Silesia	Justyna Dzioba	20	176 cm (5 ft 9 in)
Lublin	Agnieszka Ptak	22	178 cm (5 ft 10 in)
Lublin	Ewelina Szuberska	24	175 cm (5 ft 9 in)
Lubusz	Agata Szewioła	21	174 cm (5 ft 8.5 in)
Lubusz	Edyta Hreczuk	19	178 cm (5 ft 10 in)
Masovia	Magdalena Dziegielewska	20	178 cm (5 ft 10 in)
Masovia	Monika Siołek	18	174 cm (5 ft 8.5 in)
Masovia	Natalia Knee	21	170 cm (5 ft 7 in)
Masovia	Wioletta Gut	23	173 cm (5 ft 8 in)
Podlasie	Magdalena Zielińska	24	175 cm (5 ft 9 in)
Podlasie	Marlena Trykoszko	20	177 cm (5 ft 9.5 in)
Pomerania	Joanna Kryspin	24	178 cm (5 ft 10 in)
Pomerania	Zuzanna Kobylińska	22	177 cm (5 ft 9.5 in)
Silesia	Anna Weber	19	176 cm (5 ft 9 in)
Silesia	Joanna Kusiak	19	182 cm (5 ft 11.5 in)
Silesia	Natalia Dyrda	20	172 cm (5 ft 7.5 in)
Warmia-Masuria	Jolanta Fedorowicz	23	168 cm (5 ft 6 in)
West Pomerania	Małgorzata Piekarska	21	177 cm (5 ft 9.5 in)
Polish Community in Australia	Dominika Lipińska	19	171 cm (5 ft 7 in)
