= Miss Polski 2013 =

24th Miss Polski pageant

- Date: December 8, 2013
- Presenters: Paulina Sykut-Jeżyna; Krzysztof Ibisz
- Entertainment: Rafał Brzozowski; Pectus; BE.MY
- Venue: Orlen Arena, Płock
- Broadcaster: Polsat
- Entrants: 24
- Placements: 10
- Withdrawals: Lublin; Masovia
- Returns: Opole
- Winner: Ada Sztajerowska; Łódź

Miss Polski 2013 was the 24th Miss Polski pageant, held on December 8, 2013. The winner was Ada Sztajerowska of Łódź. In addition to receiving the title Sztajerowska also received a Chevrolet Spark. Sztajerowska represented Poland in both Miss World 2014 and Miss Supranational 2015.

== Finalists ==
Represents	Candidate	Age	Height
Greater Poland	Ewelina Janiak	19	174 cm (5 ft 8.5 in)
Greater Poland	Izabela Dembicka	22	176 cm (5 ft 9 in)
Greater Poland	Natalia Tomczyk	22	180 cm (5 ft 11 in)
Kuyavia-Pomerania	Angelika Kwiatkowska	20	180 cm (5 ft 11 in)
Kuyavia-Pomerania	Martyna Grzębska	18	174 cm (5 ft 8.5 in)
Lesser Poland	Paulina Maślanka	19	178 cm (5 ft 10 in)
Łódź	Ada Sztajerowska	21	177 cm (5 ft 9.5 in)
Łódź	Anna Pyrek	20	170 cm (5 ft 7 in)
Łódź	Marta Wieruszewska	18	175 cm (5 ft 9 in)
Lower Silesia	Katarzyna Sikorska	22	171 cm (5 ft 7 in)
Lower Silesia	Marta Haruk	22	178 cm (5 ft 10 in)
Opole	Anna Pabiś	24	170 cm (5 ft 7 in)
Podlasie	Joanna Szyłkowska	19	176 cm (5 ft 9 in)
Podlasie	Karolina Ladzińska	19	173 cm (5 ft 8 in)
Podlasie	Paulina Kurzynowska	21	168 cm (5 ft 6 in)
Podlasie	Viktoria Lagonda	21	180 cm (5 ft 11 in)
Pomerania	Magdalena Litewska	23	175 cm (5 ft 9 in)
Pomerania	Natalia Kaźmierczak	19	173 cm (5 ft 8 in)
Pomerania	Paulina Płoska	18	180 cm (5 ft 11 in)
Silesia	Katarzyna Kwaśny	18	173 cm (5 ft 8 in)
Silesia	Klaudia Musiał	19	173 cm (5 ft 8 in)
Silesia	Kinga Rojek	20	173 cm (5 ft 8 in)
Silesia	Monika Walkarz	21	176 cm (5 ft 9 in)
Warmia-Masuria	Karolina Hennig	22	179 cm (5 ft 10.5 in)
