= ATM Grupa =

Polish entertainment industry company

Coordinates: 51.0424°N 16.9766°E

Logo

ATM Grupa S.A. is the largest independent TV producer in Poland who was founded on February 6, 1992. The company has an approximately 14 percent share of the market estimated to be worth PLN 750m. ATM is the only company in the market with its own technical and logistic base of studios and equipment that enables them to provide of the full range of services related to preparation and production of TV programs.

== Group companies ==
ATM Capital Group comprises nine companies, including ATM Grupa S.A., a TV and film producer that owns ATM System and a provider of TV studio and equipment rental, ATM Studio - largest and one of Europe's most advanced film and television production centers, ATM FX - a company specializing in visual effects for film and television (VFX). ATM is in the process of consolidating the Polish production market by taking over other independent producers. It has already acquired Profilm, Studio A, Aidem Media, Baltmedia. Profilm is one of the longest-established independent TV producers in Poland; Aidem Media is a complete media development company with programmers, graphic artists, sound technicians, video and camera specialists and technical staff; Baltmedia is a Polish television and film production company.

In addition, in December 2008, ATM Grupa S.A. and Agora established A2 Multimedia, a producer and distributor of online video content.

== TV and film productions ==
ATM produces television programming for major Polish broadcasters such as Polsat, Polskie Media (TV4) and Telewizja Polska.

ATM Grupa S.A.'s productions include the series and soap operas:

- First Love
- Worth Loving
- Tancerze
- The Team
- Pitbull
- Kiepskis’ World
- Who's the Boss
- Crime Wave
- Tango with an Angel
- Criminal Bureau
- Znaki (Signs)

And the game shows:

- Koło Fortuny (Wheel of Fortune), co-produced with Sony Pictures Television and CBS Studios International
- The Moment of Truth
- Klamczuch
- Fort Boyard
- Strzal w 10 (Power of 10), co-produced with Sony Pictures Television
- Clueless
- The Cash Battle
- Chance of a Lifetime
- Think
- That's the Question
- Perseverance
- Russian Roulette

These reality shows:

- Big Brother, co-produced with Endemol Polska
- The Bar (six seasons)
- Two Worlds
- Amazons
- Gladiators
- The Bald and the Blondes
- J&J czyli Jola i Jarek

As well as these shows:

- The Villa (a talk show)
- Broken Bonds (a talk show)
- Make me Beautiful (a makeover show)
- M.P.’s Saloon (an animated show)

and music shows, biography programs, documentary programs and commercials.

Profilm's productions include:

- Siostry
- Od przedszkola do Opola
- Babcia Roza i Gryzelka
- Pazury Skiby (an entertainment show)
- Bez znieczulenia (a current-affairs show)
- O dwoch takich, co nic nie ukradli (a feature film)
- A City Built of Sea, a feature film which opened in October 2009
- The TV theater productions Toksyny and Naczelny

Studio A's productions include:

- Ranczo
- Doreczyciel
- Halo Hans!
- Orzel czy reszta
- Happy Hour

A2 Multimedia productions include:

- Klatka B, Pitu
- Pitu
- Lazienka
- Waga

M.T. Art. Sp.z o.o.'s productions include:

- Niesamowite historie
- Zlotopolscy.

Baltmedia's productions include:

- Ojciec Mateusz.

ATM has also:

- produced Dlaczego nie!
- co-produced with MTL Maxfilm; Pitbull, a feature film
- co-produced with Dziki Film, and The Karamazovs, a feature film, co-produced with Gutek Film

== Licences ==
ATM is the only Polish producer to license format rights to foreign buyers. The Group has licensed its formats to New Zealand for The Cash Battle, Italy, Greece, the Czech Republic, and Spain for Clueless; and to Ireland and Ukraine for the rights to rebroadcast the series First Love. In 2008, ATM Group licensed the rights to the reality TV show Stark Naked (Min El Zero) to the Lebanese television producer IMAGIC.

== Awards ==
ATM Group's companies have won multiple awards and nominations.

In July 2008, the series Ranczo won the Golden Star for Best Non-Medical Comedy at Festiwal Gwiazd in Międzyzdroje. Ranczo was also nominated for Tele Tydzien's 2008 Telekamera for Best Comedy Series, and the sitcom Halo Hans received a nomination for the prestigious Golden Rose at the international Rose d'Or Festival, the second such nomination—after First Love—for an ATM Group series. In early 2008, six ATM Group productions were nominated for 2008 Telekameras: Kiepskis’ World, Who's the Boss, Pitbull, Crime Wave, First Love, and The Ranch.

In 2007, at the Wakacyjne Kadry Film Festival held in Cieszyn, Pit Bull was awarded Best Thriller Series and Agnieszka Dygant won Best Actor in a Thriller Series for her role of Black in Crime Wave. The sitcom Kiepskis’ World has won the Telekamera for Best Comedy Series twice and received awards at the Festival of Good Humor three times. A Telekamera was also awarded to Krzysztof Ibisz, host of the reality TV show The Bar and the game show The Cash Battle, while the criminal series Crime Wave received a Teleekran.
