= Miss Polski 2022 =

33rd Miss Polski pageant

- Date: July 17, 2022
- Venue: Strzelecki Park Amphitheater, Nowy Sącz, Małopolska, Poland
- Broadcaster: Polsat
- Entrants: 24
- Placements: 10
- Withdrawals: Lubusz
- Returns: Lublin; Masovia; Warmia-Masuria; Polish community in the US
- Winner: Aleksandra Klepaczka; Łódź
- Congeniality: Zuzanna Wirtek (Masovia)
- Photogenic: Natalia Konofalska (Masovia)
- Miss Internet: Olivia Nawrot (Polish community in the US)

Miss Polski 2022 is the 33rd edition of Miss Polski held on July 17, 2022. Agata Wdowiak of Łódź crowned Aleksandra Klepaczka of Łódź as her successor at the end of the event.

== Contestants ==
24 contestants competed for the title of Miss Polski 2022:

Representing	Finalist	Age (Note: Ages at the time of Miss Polski 2022)
(Łódź Voivodeship) Łódź	Aleksandra Gronowska	27
(Łódź Voivodeship) Łódź	Aleksandra Klepaczka	22
(Lesser Poland Voivodeship) Lower Poland	Gabriela Chojnowska	22
(Lesser Poland Voivodeship) Lower Poland	Patrycja Krzywoń	23
(Lower Silesian Voivodeship) Lower Silesia	Aleksandra Wrześniewska	23
(Lublin Voivodeship) Lublin	Dominika Grabias	22
(Lublin Voivodeship) Lublin	Sylwia Stasińska	23
(Lublin Voivodeship) Lublin	Wiktoria Przybylska	21
(Masovian Voivodeship) Masovia	Katarzyna Minoł	23
(Masovian Voivodeship) Masovia	Magda Jasińska	25
(Masovian Voivodeship) Masovia	Maja Perzyna	19
(Masovian Voivodeship) Masovia	Natalia Czerw	20
(Masovian Voivodeship) Masovia	Natalia Konofalska	23
(Masovian Voivodeship) Masovia	Weronika Kujawa	20
(Masovian Voivodeship) Masovia	Zuzanna Wirtek	26
(Podlaskie Voivodeship) Podlasie	Karolina Wiszyńska	27
(Podlaskie Voivodeship) Podlasie	Magadalena Story	23
(United Kingdom) Polish Community in the U.K.	Joanna Chokało	23
(United States) Polish Community in the U.S.	Olivia Nawrot	19
(Silesian Voivodeship) Silesia	Kamila Wiśniewska	19
(Silesian Voivodeship) Silesia	Justyna Jachnik	23
(Greater Poland Voivodeship) Upper Poland	Sara Borowiecka	22
(Warmian–Masurian Voivodeship) Warmia-Masuria	Natalia Czerwińska	19
(West Pomeranian Voivodeship) West Pomerania	Julia Maź	19
