= Angelika Jurkowianiec =

Polish beauty pageant titleholder

- Born: April 8, 1996 (age 30); Namysłów, Poland
- Height: 1.79 m (5 ft 10 1/2 in)
- Beauty pageant titleholder
- Title: Miss Polski 2023
- Major competitions: Miss Polski 2023 (Winner); Miss Universe 2023 (Unplaced); Miss Supranational 2024 (Unplaced)

Angelika Jurkowianiec (born April 8, 1996) is a Polish beauty pageant titleholder who was crowned Miss Polski 2023 and represented her country at Miss Universe 2023. She also competed at Miss Supranational 2024 that was held in Poland.

== Pageantry ==
=== Miss Universe 2023 ===
Jurkowianiec represented Poland at the 72nd Miss Universe competition held in El Salvador on November 18, 2023.

=== Miss Supranational 2024 ===
Jurkowianiec represented Poland at the 15th edition of Miss Supranational 2024 competition, which was held in Poland on July 6, 2024. She did not make it to the top 25, thus ending the 15-year streak of consecutive placements that began since the launch of Miss Supranational in 2009, as well as being the first Polish contestant to be unplaced in the said pageant.

Awards and achievements
Preceded by Aleksandra Klepaczka	Miss Polski; 2023	Succeeded by Kasandra Zawal
