= National Business Review =

New Zealand online news publication

The National Business Review
- Type: Online News Publication
- Format: Tabloid
- Owner: Todd Scott
- Founder: Henry Newrick
- Editor: Calida Stuart-Menteath & Hamish McNicol
- Founded: 1970; 56 years ago
- Headquarters: Auckland
- Website: www.nbr.co.nz

National Business Review (or NBR) is one of New Zealand's business news publishing websites. The NBR has focused on delivering breaking business news and analysis since its founding in 1970. NBR is known for its independent journalism for NZ’s economy, providing expert analysis on finance and politics alongside in-depth coverage of investment, tech, Te Ao Māori, primary industries and Australian business coverage. In 2020, the publication shifted to become a digital-first publication for NZ business leaders, offering trusted insights into the Aotearoa New Zealand's economic landscape. The business news publication has won numerous awards in journalism and reporting.

It has journalists in Auckland, Wellington, Canberra and Sydney.

== History ==
The NBR was founded in 1970 by then-23 year old publisher Henry Newrick. Initially published as a fortnightly tabloid-format newspaper, it was briefly published as a daily newspaper from 1987 to 1991. New Zealand businessman Barry Colman was the NBR's publisher for 24 years, after buying it from John Fairfax & Sons in 1988. He sold it to Todd Scott in 2012.

The publication's website has a paywall model, where businesses and individual subscribers pay to access certain content. As of June 2016, the NBR had more than 4000 paying subscribers. The NBR launched an online radio platform in March 2015, NBR Radio, and in early 2018 it launched a video-on-demand platform provided by Shift72, NBR View.

In 2020, the NBR ceased printing the weekly newspaper and became a completely ad-free online multimedia news website, now updated constantly with breaking news and timely business updates.

Today, NBR focuses on publishing business news stories through multiple channels, including video, podcasts, and articles written by award-winning journalists and content supplied by verified contributors.

=== Pursuit of copyright violations ===
By December 2025, NBR had adopted a policy of pursuing subscribers who had illegally shared its paywalled content. To reduce the risk of copyright violations, the online magazine also disabled the ability of subscribers to copy, print or save articles to PDF. The magazine's co-owners Tod Scott and Hamish McNichol also confirmed that NBR had banned the Inland Revenue Department from subscribing to the magazine after the government department illegally shared its content among staff members. After compensation negotiations with Inland Revenue broke down, NBR confirmed in early January 2026 that it would take legal action against the government department through the District Court of New Zealand.

By late September 2026, the National Business Review had reached settlements with the Financial Markets Authority, Serious Fraud Office and Department of Internal Affairs, who admitted to breaching the magazine's subscription and copyright policies. The NBR also confirmed that it was pursuing legal action against both the IRD and investment platform Snowball Effect for copyright and subscription policy breaches. On 16 November 2026, the Ministry of Business, Innovation and Employment reached a $251,000 settlement with NBR over the unauthorised sharing of paywalled stories among its employees.

== The NBR List ==
The publication produces an annual The Rich List with the estimated wealth of the richest New Zealanders. In 2020, Todd Scott announced that NBR had "called off the 2020 NBR Rich List" due to the economic impact of COVID-19, saying it would be "vulgar" to focus on wealthy people. Today, NBR produces "The NBR List" which focuses on NZ's top wealth creators and philanthropy in New Zealand.

In 2024, the NBR Rich List named brothers Mat and Nick Mowbray the wealthiest businesspeople in New Zealand, with a $20 billion valuation, surpassing the previous holder of the title Graeme Hart. The Mowbray brothers retained the top spot in 2025.
