= Todd Scott =

New Zealand broadcaster

Todd Scott is the owner and publisher of National Business Review, alongside his wife, Jackie Scott.

== Biography ==
After leaving school early, he trained as a butcher, and in 1989 was named New Zealand young butcher of the year.

=== Radio ===
During the early 1990s, Scott was a part-time announcer with More FM. He was the 2003 sales person of the year of the NZ Radio Awards. In 2004, as promotions advisor for RadioWorks, Scott awarded The Edge 97.5 Wellington/WelTec Scholarship to a recipient student of the Wellington Institute of Technology.

=== Television ===
In 1997 and 1998, Scott co-hosted Lotto with Hilary Timmins and in 1999 appeared on the television show Wish You Were Here. He appeared on TV3’s Target from 2002 to 2004 and hosted the quiz show Cash Battle on TV2 in 2005.

=== National Business Review ===
Scott joined NBR in 2008 as director of sales to lead development of its online business. He was appointed chief executive in 2010.

In 2012, he bought the business from long-time owner Barry Colman. In late 2017, Colman filed a general security agreement over Scott's holding company Fourth Estate Holdings (2012), giving Colman the right to appoint receivers if at any point repayments were missed or the terms of the agreement were breached. In February 2018 Scott remortgaged his $4.5m St Heliers home, borrowing that was related to his involvement in NBR.

In early 2020, Scott settled his debt with Colman, selling his home for $5.15m to achieve this, and became sole owner of NBR. In an interview with the Spinoff, Scott admitted to losing $14m. After selling his house, Scott and his wife live in their motorhome.

In June 2020, former Finance Minister Steven Joyce was awarded $269,000 in solicitor and client costs after successfully suing NBR and Scott for defamation.
