= Miss Polski =

National beauty pageant competition in Poland

Miss Polski Organization
- Formation: 1990; 36 years ago
- Type: Beauty pageant
- Headquarters: Warsaw
- Location: Poland
- Members: Miss Supranational; Miss Cosmo; The Miss Globe; Miss Tourism International; Reina Internacional del Café
- Official language: Polish
- General Director: Gerhard Parzutka von Lipinski (Nowa Scena)

The Miss Polski is a national beauty pageant in Poland to select the official ambassador of Poland at the Miss Supranational, Miss Cosmo, The Miss Globe, Miss Tourism International and Reina Internacional del Café pageants. This pageant is a famous Polish national pageant after Miss Polonia. This pageant is unrelated to the Miss Polonia pageant.

== History ==
Eliminations are organized at the regional level, then the winners and runners-up in individual regions, as well as invited candidates, take part in the quarter-finals and then in the semi-finals. The selected finalists take part in the grand finale, where the main prize is the title of Miss Polski.

Until 2014, the winner represented Poland in the Miss World and Miss Supranational competitions.

Since 2015, in the Winner will represent Poland in Miss Universe, Miss International and Miss Supranational competitions. Additionally, runners-up and finalists take part in other international competitions. For many years, the final of the competition has been organized on Polsat television.

== International crowns ==
- Two – Miss International winners:
  - Agnieszka Kotlarska † (1991)
  - Agnieszka Pachałko (1993)
- One – Miss Supranational winner:
  - Monika Lewczuk (2011)
- One – Reinado Internacional del Café winner:
  - Aleksandra Klepaczka (2024)

== Titleholders ==
Year	Miss Polski	Voivodeships
1990	Ewa Maria Szymczak	Łódź, Łódź
1991	Agnieszka Kotlarska †; Miss International 1991	Wrocław, Lower Silesia
1992	Elżbieta Dziech	Bielsko-Biała, Silesia
1993	Agnieszka Pachałko; Miss International 1993	Bydgoszcz, Kuyavia-Pomerania
1994	Magdalena Lewandowska	Bydgoszcz, Kuyavia-Pomerania
1995	Sabina Śnioch	Dąbrowa Górnicza, Silesia
1996	Anna Kowalczyk	Warszawa, Masovia
1997	Grażyna Domańska	Wrocław, Lower Silesia
1998	Kamila Wiśniewska	Poznań, Greater Poland
1999	Renata Piotrowska	Toruń, Kuyavia-Pomerania
2000	Dorota Pikuła	Mirków, Lower Silesia
2001	Ewa Wiertel.	Lubań, Lower Silesia
2002	Magdalena Stanisławska.	Białystok, Podlasie
2003	Kaja Kruszyńska.	Frombork, Warmia-Masuria
2004	Elżbieta Sawerska.	Lublin, Lublin
2005	Renata Nowak.	Bydgoszcz, Kuyavia-Pomerania
2006	Aleksandra Ogłaza	Bychawa, Lublin
2007	Karolina Zakrzewska	Zielona Góra, Lubusz
2008	Klaudia Ungerman	Wysiedle, West Pomerania
2009	Anna Jamróz	Rumia, Pomerania
2010	Agata Szewioła	Żary, Lubusz
2011	Angelika Ogryzek	Szczecin, West Pomerania
2012	Katarzyna Krzeszowska	Krynica Zdrój, Lesser Poland
2013	Ada Sztajerowska	Piotrków Trybunalski, Łódź
2014	Ewa Mielnicka	Ostrołęka, Masovia
2015	Magdalena Bieńkowska	Mikołajki, Warmia-Masuria
2016	Paulina Maziarz	Zwoleń, Masovia
2017	Kamila Świerc	Opole, Opole
2018	Olga Buława	Świnoujście, West Pomerania
2019	Magdalena Kasiborska	Zabrze, Silesia
2020	Anna Maria Jaromin	Katowice, Silesia
2021	Agata Wdowiak	Łódź, Łódź
2022	Aleksandra Klepaczka; Reinado Internacional del Café 2024	Łódź, Łódź
2023	Angelika Jurkowianiec	Namysłów, Opole
2024	Kasandra Zawal	Bierzglinek, Greater Poland
2025	Oliwia Mikulska	Lubusz
2026	Wiktoria Ptak	Supraśl, Podlaskie Voivodeship

=== Winners by Voivodeships ===
Voivodeships	Titles	Year(s)
Silesia	4	1992, 1995, 2019, 2020
Kuyavia-Pomerania	4	1993, 1994, 1999, 2005
Lower Silesia	4	1991, 1997, 2000, 2001
Łódź	4	1990, 2013, 2021, 2022
Lubusz	3	2007, 2010, 2025
West Pomerania	3	2008, 2011, 2018
Masovia	3	1996, 2014, 2016
Podlasie	2	2002, 2026
Opole	2	2017, 2023
Warmia-Masuria	2	2003, 2015
Lublin	2	2004, 2006
Lesser Poland	1	2012
Pomerania	1	2009
Greater Poland	1	1997

Voivodeships yet to win:

- Holy Cross
- Subcarpathia

== Titleholders under Miss Polski org. ==
=== Miss Supranational Poland ===
- : Declared as Winner
- : Ended as runner-up or top 5/6 qualification
- : Ended as one of the finalists or semifinalists
- : Ended as special awards winner

The winner of Miss Polski usually competes in the Miss Supranational pageant. Sometimes a Runner-up or finalist is sent instead of the winner.

Year	Voivodeship	Miss Polski	Placement at Miss Universe	Special Awards
2027	Podlaskie	Wiktoria Ptak	TBA	
2026	Lubusz	Oliwia Mikulska	Top 12	Miss Supranational Europe
2025	Greater Poland	Kasandra Zawal	Top 24	
2024	Opole	Angelika Jurkowianiec	Unplaced	
2023	Łódź	Aleksandra Klepaczka	Top 24	
2022	Łódź	Agata Wdowiak	Top 12	Miss Supranational Europe
2021	Greater Poland	Natalia Balicka	Top 12	Miss Supranational Europe
2020	Due to the impact of COVID-19 pandemic, no competition held			
2019	Opole	Kamila Świerc	Top 25	
2018	Warmia-Masuria	Magdalena Bieńkowska	2nd Runner-up	
2017	Masovia	Paulina Maziarz	Top 10	Miss Supranational Europe
2016	Masovia	Ewa Mielnicka	Top 10	
2015	Łódź	Ada Sztajerowska	Top 20	
2014	Lesser Poland	Katarzyna Krzeszowska	4th Runner-up	
2013	West Pomerania	Angelika Ogryzek	Top 20	
2012	Masovia	Agnieszka Karasiewicz	Top 20	
2011	Masovia	Monika Lewczuk	Miss Supranational 2011	
2010	Pomerania	Anna Jamróz	Top 15	Miss Supranational Europe
2009	West Pomerania	Klaudia Ungerman	2nd Runner-up	

=== Reina Internacional del Café Poland ===
- : Declared as Winner
- : Ended as runner-up or top 5/6 qualification
- : Ended as one of the finalists or semifinalists
- : Ended as special awards winner

Year	Voivodeship	Miss Polski	Placement at Reina Internacional del Café	Special Awards
2025	Lower Silesia	Martyna Rurańska	1st Princess	
2024	Łódź	Aleksandra Klepaczka	Reina Internacional del Café 2024	Best Hair
2023	Łódź	Agata Wdowiak	Unplaced	Queen of the Police
2022	Łódź	Katarzyna Synowiec	Unplaced	
2021	Due to the impact of COVID-19 pandemic, no competition held			
2020	Greater Poland	Natalia Daria Pigula	1st Princess	
2019	Łódź	Maja Aleksandra Sieroń	Unplaced	Best Hair
2018	Mikołajki	Magdalena Wesolowska	Unplaced	Best Face

=== Miss Cosmo Poland ===
- : Declared as Winner
- : Ended as runner-up or top 5/6 qualification
- : Ended as one of the finalists or semifinalists
- : Ended as special awards winner

Year	Voivodeship	Miss Polski	Placement at Miss Cosmo	Special Awards
2025	Did not compete			
2024	Warmian–Masurian	Weronika Kietlińska	Unplaced	

== Past titleholders under Miss Polski org. ==
=== Miss Universe Poland ===
- : Declared as Winner
- : Ended as runner-up or top 5/6 qualification
- : Ended as one of the finalists or semifinalists
- : Ended as special awards winner

The main of Miss Polonia represents her country at Miss Universe. Since Miss Polonia is the only one who franchised the Miss Universe Organization, sometimes the organization designated the runner-up or contestant to be "Miss Universe Poland". Began 2019 the winner of Miss Polski competes at Miss Universe competition. On occasion, when the winner does not qualify (due to age) for either contest, a runner-up is sent.

Year	Voivodeship	Miss Polski	Placement at Miss Universe	Special Awards
Miss Polski
2024	Greater Poland	Kasandra Zawal	Unplaced	
2023	Opole	Angelika Jurkowianiec	Unplaced	
2022	Łódź	Aleksandra Klepaczka	Unplaced	
2021	Łódź	Agata Wdowiak	Unplaced	
2020	Łódź	Natalia Piguła	Unplaced	
2019	West Pomerania	Olga Buława	Unplaced	Miss Congeniality
Miss Polonia
2018	Holy Cross	Magdalena Swat	Top 20	
2017	Łódź	Katarzyna Włodarek	Unplaced	
2016	Warmia-Masuria	Izabella Krzan	Unplaced	
2015	West Pomerania	Weronika Szmajdzińska	Unplaced	
2014	Lesser Poland	Marcela Chmielowska	Unplaced	
2013	Masovia	Paulina Krupińska	Unplaced	Miss Photogenic
2012	Pomerania	Marcelina Zawadzka	Top 16	
2011	Podlasie	Rozalia Mancewicz	Unplaced	
2010	Lower Silesia	Maria Nowakowska	Unplaced	
2009	Lower Silesia	Angelika Jakubowska	Unplaced	
2008	Łódź	Barbara Tatara	Unplaced	
2007	Masovia	Dorota Gawron	Unplaced	
2006	Masovia	Francys Mayela Barraza Sudnicka	Unplaced	
2005	Kuyavia-Pomerania	Marta Kossakowska	Unplaced	
2004	Subcarpathia	Paulina Panek	Unplaced	
2003	Holy Cross	Iwona Makuch	Unplaced	
2002	West Pomerania	Joanna Drozdowska	Unplaced	
2001	Masovia	Monika Gruda	Unplaced	
2000	Warmia-Masuria	Emilia Ewelina Raszynska	Unplaced	
1999	Lublin	Katarzyna Pakula	Unplaced	
1998	Pomerania	Sylwia Małgorzata Kupiec	Unplaced	
1997	Greater Poland	Agnieszka Zielińska	Unplaced	
1996	Pomerania	Monika Chróścicka-Wnętrzak	Unplaced	
1995	Silesia	Magdalena Pęcikiewicz	Unplaced	
1994	West Pomerania	Joanna Brykczyńska	Unplaced	
1993	Warmia-Masuria	Marzenna Wolska	Unplaced	
1992	Lublin	Izabela Filipowska	Unplaced	
1991	Masovia	Joanna Michalska	Unplaced	
1990	Łódź	Małgorzata Obieżalska	Unplaced	
1989	West Pomerania	Joanna Gapińska	3rd Runner-up	
Did not compete between 1987—1988
1986	Masovia	Brygida Elżbieta Bziukiewicz	3rd Runner-up	
1985	Lubusz	Katarzyna Zawidzka	Unplaced	
1984	Masovia	Joanna Karska	Unplaced	
Did not compete between 1960—1983
1959	Masovia	Zuzanna Cembrowska	Top 16	
1958	Masovia	Alicja Bobrowska	4th Runner-up	

=== Miss World Poland ===
- : Declared as Winner
- : Ended as runner-up or top 5/6 qualification
- : Ended as one of the finalists or semifinalists
- : Ended as special awards winner

Miss Polonia started to be franchise holder in 1983, from 1983 to 2007 the Miss Polonia was selecting the winner or runner-up to Miss World competition. From 2007 to 2014 the license of Miss World bought to Miss Polski and continued between 2015 and 2017 the Miss World Poland contest independently selected the winner to Miss World. Started in 2018 the Miss Polonia returned to be national franchise holder of Miss World.

Year	Voivodeship	Miss Polski	Placement at Miss World	Special Awards
2017	Warmia-Masuria	Magdalena Bieńkowska	Top 40	Miss World Top Model (Top 30)
Miss World Poland
2016	Masovia	Kaja Klimkiewicz	Unplaced	Miss World Talent (Top 21)
2015	Pomerania	Marta Kaja Pałucka	Top 20	Miss World Top Model (Top 30); Best in Interview (Top 12)
Miss Polski
2014	Łódź	Ada Sztajerowska	Unplaced	
2013	Lesser Poland	Katarzyna Krzeszowska	Unplaced	
2012	West Pomerania	Weronika Szmajdzińska	Unplaced	Miss World Top Model (1st Runner-up)
2011	West Pomerania	Angelika Natalia Ogryzek	Unplaced	
2010	Lubusz	Agata Szewiola	Unplaced	
2009	Pomerania	Anna Jamróz	Top 16	
2008	West Pomerania	Klaudia Maria Ungerman	Unplaced	
2007	Lubusz	Karolina Zakrzewska	Unplaced	
Miss Polonia
2006	West Pomerania	Marzena Cieslik	Unplaced	Miss World Beach Beauty (Top 10)
2005	Opole	Malwina Ratajczak	Unplaced	
2004	Greater Poland	Katarzyna Weronika Borowicz	Top 5	Miss World Top Model (Top 20)
2003	Lesser Poland	Karolina Gorazda	Unplaced	Miss World Beach Beauty (Top 10)
2002	Lower Silesia	Marta Matyjasik	Unplaced	
2001	West Pomerania	Joanna Drozdowska	Unplaced	
2000	Kuyavian-Pomerania	Justyna Bergmann	Unplaced	
1999	Lublin	Marta Kwiecień	Unplaced	
1998	Warmia-Masuria	Izabela Opęchowska	Unplaced	
1997	Silesia	Roksana Jonek	Unplaced	
1996	Greater Poland	Agnieszka Zielinska	Unplaced	
1995	Lower Silesia	Ewa Jzabella Tylecka	Unplaced	
1994	Silesia	Jadwiga Flank	Unplaced	
1993	Lower Silesia	Alexandra Spieczynska	Unplaced	
1992	Lesser Poland	Ewa Wachowicz	Top 5	
1991	Silesia	Karina Wojciechowska	Unplaced	
Miss Polski
1990	Masovia	Ewa Maria Szymczak	Top 10	
Miss Polonia
1989	Pomerania	Aneta Kręglicka	Miss World 1989	
1988	West Pomerania	Joanna Gapinska	Unplaced	
1987	West Pomerania	Monika Ewa Nowosadko	Top 6	
1986	Silesia	Renata Fatla	Unplaced	
1985	Lubusz	Katarzyna Dorota Zawidzka	Top 15	
1984	Masovia	Magdalena Jaworska	Unplaced	
1983	West Pomerania	Lidia Wasiak	Unplaced	

=== Miss International Poland ===
- : Declared as Winner
- : Ended as runner-up or top 5/6 qualification
- : Ended as one of the finalists or semifinalists
- : Ended as special awards winner

In the beginning the winner of Miss Juwenaliów 1959 participated at Miss International. Since 1985 the Miss International Poland will be selected by Miss Polonia, Miss Polski or one of runners-up from Miss Polonia or Miss Polski pageant. As of 2015 Miss International franchise handled by Miss Polski Organization. Since 2024, Miss Polonia took back the Miss International franchise

Year	Voivodeship	Miss Polski	Placement at Miss International	Special Awards
2023	Greater Poland	Julia Marcinkowska	Unplaced	
2022	Lublin	Sylwia Stasińska	Unplaced	
Due to the impact of COVID-19 pandemic, no competition held between 2020―2021
2019	Podlasie	Karina Szczepanek	Unplaced	
2018	Pomerania	Marta Kaja Pałucka	Unplaced	
2017	Masovia	Paulina Maziarz	Unplaced	
2016	Warmia-Masuria	Magdalena Bieńkowska	Top 15	
2015	Masovia	Ewa Mielnicka	Unplaced	
Polish Representatives from Miss Polonia
2014	Masovia	Zaneta Pludowska	Unplaced	
2013	Masovia	Katarzyna Oracka	Unplaced	
2012	Podlasie	Rozalia Mancewicz	Unplaced	
Polish Representative from Miss Polonia of Łódź Voivodeship
2011	Masovia	Adrianna Olga Wojciechowska	Unplaced	
Polish Representatives from Miss Polonia
2010	West Pomerania	Zaneta Sitko	Unplaced	
2009	Lower Silesia	Angelika Jakubowska	Unplaced	
2008	West Pomerania	Anna Maria Tarnowska	2nd Runner-up	
2007	Masovia	Dorota Gawron	Unplaced	
2006	Masovia	Marta Jakoniuk	Unplaced	
2005	Podlasie	Monika Szeroka	Unplaced	
2004	Masovia	Marta Matyjasik	Unplaced	
2003	Did not compete			
Miss Lata z Radiem
2002	Opole	Monika Angermann	Top 12	
Polish Representatives from Miss Polonia
2001	Warmia-Masuria	Malgorzata Rozniecka	Miss International 2001	
2000	Warmia-Masuria	Ewelina Raszynska	Unplaced	
Miss Lata z Radiem
1999	Kuyavia-Pomerania	Adrianna Gerczew	Top 12	
Polish Representatives from Miss Polonia
1998	Lublin	Agnieszka Osińska	Top 12	
1997	Pomerania	Agnieszka Beata Myko	Top 12	
1996	Silesia	Monika Marta Adamek	Unplaced	
1995	Did not compete			
1994	Kuyavia-Pomerania	Ilona Felicjanska	Unplaced	
Miss Polski
1993	Kuyavia-Pomerania	Agnieszka Pachalko	Miss International 1993	
1992	Silesia	Elzbieta Jadwiga Dziech	Unplaced	
1991	Lower Silesia	Agnieszka Kotlarska †	Miss International 1991	
1990	Pomerania	Ewa Maria Szymczak	Top 10	
Miss Polonia
1989	West Pomerania	Aneta Kreglicka	1st Runner-up	
1988	Did not compete			
1987	West Pomerania	Monika Nowosadko	Unplaced	
1986	Silesia	Renata Fatla	Unplaced	
1985	Lubusz	Katarzyna Zawidzka	Top 15	
Miss Juwenaliów
Did not compete between 1961—1984, in 1966 No contest
1960	Lesser Poland	Marzena Malinowska	Top 15	

=== Miss Europe Poland ===
- : Declared as Winner
- : Ended as runner-up or top 5/6 qualification
- : Ended as one of the finalists or semifinalists
- : Ended as special awards winner

The winner of Miss Polski also competed in the Miss Europe pageant.

Year	Voivodeship	Miss Polski	Placement at Miss Europe	Special Awards
1993	West Pomerania	Dorota Wrobel	Unplaced	
1992	Greater Poland	Jana Fabian	Unplaced	
1991	Masovia	Ewa Maria Szymczak	Top 13	
Polish representatives from Miss Polonia
1990	No contest in 1989 & 1990			
1989	No contest in 1989 & 1990			
1988	West Pomerania	Ewa Monika Nowosadko	1st Runner-Up	
1987	No contest in 1986 & 1987			
1986	No contest in 1986 & 1987			
1985	Masovia	Magdalena Jaworska	Unplaced	
1984	West Pomerania	Lidia Wasiak	Unplaced	
Did not compete between 1955 and 1982, no contest in 1975, 1977, 1979 & 1983
Polish representatives from Miss Polonia France
1954	Polish Community in France	Kazimiera Klimczak	Unplaced	
Polish representatives from Miss Polonia
Did not compete between 1938 and 1953, no contest between 1939 and 1947 due to World War II
1937	Masovia	Józefa Kaczmarkiewicz †	Unplaced	
1936	Did not compete between 1935 & 1936			
1935	Did not compete between 1935 & 1936			
1934	Wilno***	Maria Zabkiewicz †	Unplaced	
1933	Did not compete in 1933			
1932	Greater Poland	Zofia Dobrowolska †	Unplaced	
1931	Did not compete in 1931			
1930	Lwów****	Zofia Batycka†	Unplaced	
1929	Masovia	Władysława Kostakówna †	1st Runner-Up	
1928	No contest in 1928			
1927	Masovia	Aniela Bogucka †	1st Runner-Up	

- (***) The city of Wilno or Vilnius becomes part of the independent Lithuania.
- (****) As of 1991 Lwów or Lviv becomes part of the independent Ukraine.

=== Miss Grand Poland ===
- : Declared as Winner
- : Ended as runner-up or top 5/6 qualification
- : Ended as one of the finalists or semifinalists
- : Ended as special awards winner

Miss Polski held the license of Miss Grand International for Poland from 2013 to 2016; during this period, some of the pageant's finalists were appointed as country representatives for Miss Grand International. The Miss Grand license was then transferred to another national pageant, Miss Polonia, in 2018.

Year	Voivodeship	Miss Grand Poland	Original national title	Placement at Miss Grand International
2016	Podlasie	Marta Redo	1st runner-up Miss Polski 2015	Unplaced
2015	Lesser Poland	Katarzyna Krzeszowska	Miss Polski 2012	Top 20
2014	West Pomerania	Angelika Ogryzek	Miss Polski 2011	Top 10
2013	Podlasie	Anna Moniuszko	Top 10 – Miss Polski 2012	Unplaced

== See also ==
- Miss Polonia
- Miss World Poland
- Miss Earth Poland
