= Miss Polski 2019 =

30th Miss Polski pageant

- Date: December 8, 2019
- Presenters: Paulina Sykut-Jeżyna; Krzysztof Ibisz; Zygmunt Chajzer; Agnieszka Popielewicz
- Entertainment: Kombii; Grzegorz Hyży; Sylwia Grzeszczak
- Venue: Katowice
- Broadcaster: Polsat
- Entrants: 24
- Placements: 10
- Withdrawals: Holy Cross; Kuyavia-Pomerania; Lublin; Polish Community in the U.K.
- Winner: Magdalena Kasiborska; Silesia

Miss Polski 2019 was the 30th Miss Polski pageant, held on December 8, 2019. The winner was Magdalena Kasiborska of Silesia. Kasiborska was originally supposed to represent Poland in Miss Universe 2020 but had to withdraw for health reasons. The 1st Runner-up, Natalia Piguła of Łódź, replaced her and represented the country at Miss Universe.

== Final results ==
Final results	Contestant
Miss Polski 2019	Silesia – Magdalena Kasiborska
1st Runner-Up; Miss Universe Poland 2020	Łódź – Natalia Piguła
2nd Runner-Up	Łódź – Marta Skwierczyńska
3rd Runner-Up	Silesia – Dominika Konarska
4th Runner-Up	Lower Silesia – Karolina Wiltowska
Top 10	Łódź – Małgorzata Gierach; Lower Silesia – Natalia Baran; Masovia – Anita Sobótka; Podlasie – Aleksandra Drężek; Warmia-Masuria – Kornelia Gołębiewska

=== Special awards ===
Award	Contestant
Miss Internet	Podlasie – Aleksandra Drężek
Miss Polsat Viewers	Łódź – Marta Skwierczyńska
Miss Virtual Poland	Masovia – Anita Sobótka

== Finalists ==
Represents	Candidate	Age	Height	Title/Qualification Method
Łódź	Małgorzata Gierach	19	172 cm (5 ft 7.5 in)	1st Runner-Up of Miss Lower Silesia
Łódź	Marta Skwierczyńska	22	175 cm (5 ft 9 in)	2nd Runner-Up of Miss Łódź 2019
Łódź	Natalia Piguła	25	178 cm (5 ft 10 in)	Miss Łódź 2019
Łódź	Nela Serwacińska	22	172 cm (5 ft 7.5 in)	4th Runner-Up of Miss Łódź 2019
Lower Poland	Paulina Bołoz	19		
Lower Silesia	Karolina Wiltowska	19	176 cm (5 ft 9 in)	Miss Lower Silesia 2019
Lower Silesia	Natalia Baran	21	172 cm (5 ft 7.5 in)	2nd Runner-Up of Miss Lower Silesia 2019
Lower Silesia	Paulina Karasiuk	21	176 cm (5 ft 9 in)	Miss Wrocławia 2019
Lower Silesia	Weronika Frąckowiak	19	174 cm (5 ft 8.5 in)	
Masovia	Anita Sobótka	19	174 cm (5 ft 8.5 in)	Miss Warsaw 2019
Masovia	Anna Kozłowska	19	171 cm (5 ft 7 in)	Miss Radom 2019
Masovia	Julia Szewczuk	19	171 cm (5 ft 7 in)	
Masovia	Justyna Maliszewska	21	174 cm (5 ft 8.5 in)	
Masovia	Magdalena Karoń	27	172 cm (5 ft 7.5 in)	
Opole	Martyna Jagielska	22		Miss Opole 2019
Podlasie	Aleksandra Drężek	21		Miss Podlasie 2019
Podlasie	Karolina Piaścik	18		2nd Runner-Up of Miss Łomża 2019
Podlasie	Zuzanna Aszmian	22	177 cm (5 ft 9.5 in)	2nd Runner-Up of Miss Podlasie 2019
Pomerania	Agnieszka Choszcz	22	172 cm (5 ft 7.5 in)	
Silesia	Magdalena Kasiborska	19		Miss Beskids 2019
Silesia	Dominika Konarska	24		Miss Silesia 2019
Subcarpathia	Marta Machnik	26		1st Runner-Up of Miss Subcarpathia
Warmia-Masuria	Kornelia Gołębiewska	19	177 cm (5 ft 9.5 in)	Miss Warmia and Masuria 2019
West Pomerania	Justyna Niegolewska	27	180 cm (5 ft 11 in)	1st Runner-Up of Miss West Pomerania 2019

== Notes ==
=== Withdrawals ===
- Holy Cross
- Kuyavia-Pomerania
- Lublin
- Polish Community in the U.K.

=== Did not compete ===
- Lubusz
- Lower Silesia
- Upper Poland
- Polish Community in Argentina
- Polish Community in Australia
- Polish Community in Belarus
- Polish Community in Brazil
- Polish Community in Canada
- Polish Community in Czechia
- Polish Community in France
- Polish Community in Germany
- Polish Community in Ireland
- Polish Community in Israel
- Polish Community in Kazakhstan
- Polish Community in Lithuania
- Polish Community in Russia
- Polish Community in Slovakia
- Polish Community in South Africa
- Polish Community in Sweden
- Polish Community in Ukraine
- Polish Community in the U.S.
- Polish Community in Venezuela
