= Gwiezdny cyrk =

- Winner: Kamila Porczyk
- No. of episodes: 8

Release
- Original network: Polsat
- Original release: March 6 – April 24, 2008

Gwiezdny cyrk is a television show on the Polish television network Polsat. Agnieszka Popielewicz and Zygmunt Chajzer were the hosts, and the judges were: Maryla Rodowicz, Przemysław Saleta, Ewa Zalewska, Piotr Bałtroczyk.

== I season ==
Place	Star	Average	Best score	Worst score
1	Kamila Porczyk	7.8	8.5	6.5
2	Anna Powierza	6.2	8.8	5.5
3	Marek Siudym	8.2	10.0	6.8
4	Piotr Pręgowski	7.5	8.3	6.8
5	Szymon Wydra	7.8	8.5	7.0
6	Władysław Grzywna	7.3	8.5	6.5
7	Mariusz Zalejski	6.4	6.8	6.0
8	Grażyna Wolszczak	6.4	6.8	6.3
9	Maria Góralczyk	3.3	3.3	3.3

=== Scores ===
Star	Episode 1	Episode 2	Episode 3	Episode 4	Episode 5	Episode 6	Episode 7	Episode 8
Kamila Porczyk	-	6.8	6.5	7.3	7.5	7.8	8.5 + 8.5 = 8.5	6.8 + 8.3 + 8.5 = 7.9
Anna Powierza	-	5.5	6.0	6.0	6.3	6.5	7.0 + 6.8 = 6.9	7.3 + 7.0 + 8.8 = 7.7
Marek Siudym	-	8.3	7.0	7.8	6.8	9.0	8.3 + 9.0 = 8.7	7.0 + 8.5 + 10.0 = 8.5
Piotr Pręgowski	-	8.0	6.8	6.8	7.5	7.3	7.5 + 8.3 = 7.9	eliminated
Szymon Wydra	-	8.0	7.0	7.5	8.5	8.0	eliminated	
Władysław Grzywna	-	8.5	6.5	7.3	6.8	eliminated		
Mariusz Zalejski	-	6.0	6.3	6.8	eliminated			
Grażyna Wolszczak	-	6.5	6.3	eliminated				
Maria Góralczyk	-	3.3	eliminated					
