= Aleksandra Klepaczka =

Polish beauty pageant titleholder (born 2000)

- Born: Bukowiec, Łódź, Poland
- Beauty pageant titleholder
- Title: Miss Polski 2022
- Major competitions: Miss Polski 2022; (Winner); Miss Universe 2022; (Unplaced); Miss Supranational 2023; (Top 24); Reinado Internacional Del Cafe 2024; (Winner)

Aleksandra Klepaczka is a Polish beauty pageant titleholder who won Miss Polski 2022. Klepaczka represented Poland at Miss Universe 2022 Miss Supranational 2023 and again at Reina Internacional del Café 2024.

== Pageantry ==
=== Miss Polski 2022 ===
Klepaczka won Miss Polski 2022 on July 17, 2022, at Nowy Sącz representing Łódź. She was crowned by the outgoing titleholder, Agata Wdowiak.

=== Miss Universe 2022 ===
Klepaczka represented Poland at Miss Universe 2022, at the New Orleans Morial Convention Center in New Orleans, Louisiana, US on January 14, 2023. During the national costume competition, she wore a red and white dress with poppy embellishments complete with a poppy-shaped hat and the flag of Poland. She did not reach the top 16.

=== Miss Supranational 2023 ===
Klepaczka also represented Poland at the Miss Supranational 2023, getting to top 24.
