= Miss Polski 2017 =

28th Miss Polski pageant

- Date: December 3, 2017
- Venue: Municipal Sports and Recreation Center (MOSIR), Krynica-Zdrój
- Broadcaster: Polsat
- Entrants: 24
- Placements: 10
- Withdrawals: Holy Cross; Lubusz; West Pomerania
- Returns: Greater Poland; Lesser Poland
- Winner: Kamila Świerc; Opole
- Congeniality: Katarzyna Sikora (Silesia)
- Photogenic: Natalia Kowalczyk (Masovia)

Miss Polski 2017 was the 28th Miss Polski pageant, held on December 3, 2017. The winner was Kamila Świerc of Opole. Świerc then represented Poland at Miss Supranational 2019. The 1st Runner-Up, Marta Ziębakowska represented the country at Miss International 2018.

== Final results ==
Final results	Contestant
Miss Polski 2017; Miss Supranational Poland 2019	Opole – Kamila Świerc
1st Runner-Up; Miss International Poland 2018	Pomerania – Marta Pałucka
2nd Runner-Up	Łódź – Marta Ziębakowska
3rd Runner-Up	Podlasie – Angelika Kitlas
4th Runner-Up	Masovia – Natalia Kowalczyk
Top 10	Greater Poland – Zuzanna Słaboszewska; Lesser Poland – Kinga Choma; Masovia – Anna Matulaniec; Opole – Natalia Rokniak; Silesia – Klaudia Kluczyk

=== Special awards ===
Award	Contestant
Best Model	Podlasie – Angelika Kitlas
Miss Friendship	Silesia – Katarzyna Sikora
Miss Grace and Elegance	Pomerania – Marta Pałucka
Miss Hotel Beskids	Łódź - Marta Ziębakowska
Miss Photogenic	Masovia – Natalia Kowalczyk
Miss Polsat Viewers	Opole – Natalia Rokniak
Miss Semilac	Lesser Poland – Kinga Choma
Miss Social Media	Łódź – Karolina Źródłowska
Miss WP.PL	Pomerania – Ewelina Jedynasta

== Finalists ==
Represents	Candidate	Age	Height	Title/Qualification Method
Greater Poland	Zuzanna Słaboszewska	21	178 cm (5 ft 10 in)	Nationwide Casting
Kuyavia-Pomerania	Paulina Zgoda	20	174 cm (5 ft 8.5 in)	Miss Kuyavia-Pomerania 2017
Lesser Poland	Katarzyna Żydek	24	170 cm (5 ft 7 in)	Miss Beskids
Lesser Poland	Kinga Choma	19	170 cm (5 ft 7 in)	Miss Sądecki 2017
Łódź	Karolina Źródłowska	19	168 cm (5 ft 6 in)	1st Runner-Up of Miss Łódź 2017
Łódź	Marta Ziębakowska	20	173 cm (5 ft 8 in)	Miss Łódź 2017
Łódź	Oliwia Walczak	20	178 cm (5 ft 10 in)	Nationwide Casting
Lublin	Anna Jakubik	20	177 cm (5 ft 9.5 in)	Miss Lublin 2017
Lublin	Dominika Słaby	21	177 cm (5 ft 9.5 in)	Green Card of the Lublin Region
Masovia	Anna Matulaniec	18	178 cm (5 ft 10 in)	Miss Radom 2017
Masovia	Natalia Kowalczyk	22	177 cm (5 ft 9.5 in)	Green Card of Masovia
Opole	Gajana Galstjan	22	168 cm (5 ft 6 in)	Miss Opole 2017
Opole	Kamila Świerc	18	178 cm (5 ft 10 in)	Miss of the Opole Region 2017
Opole	Natalia Rokniak	18	170 cm (5 ft 7 in)	1st Runner-Up of Miss of the Opole Region 2017
Podlasie	Angelika Kitlas	22	174 cm (5 ft 8.5 in)	1st Runner-Up of Miss Podlasie 2017
Pomerania	Ewelina Jedynasta	19	177 cm (5 ft 9.5 in)	Miss Pomerania 2017
Pomerania	Marta Pałucka	25	180 cm (5 ft 11 in)	Nationwide Casting
Silesia	Katarzyna Sikora	20	181 cm (5 ft 11 in)	Green Card of the Pszczyna Region
Silesia	Klaudia Kluczyk	21	175 cm (5 ft 9 in)	Miss Silesia 2019
Silesia	Michalina Sikorska	24	176 cm (5 ft 9 in)	2nd Runner-Up of Miss Silesia 2017
Subcarpathia	Jagienka Preisner	18	166 cm (5 ft 4.5 in)	2nd Runner-Up of Miss Subcarpathia 2017
Warmia-Masuria	Wioletta Urbanska	22	177 cm (5 ft 9.5 in)	1st Runner-Up of Miss Elbląg
Polish Community in the U.K.	Alexandra Serafin	22	173 cm (5 ft 8 in)	Green UK Card
Polish Community in the U.K.	Alicja Zalewska	20	177 cm (5 ft 9.5 in)	Green UK Card

== Notes ==
=== Withdrawals ===
- Holy Cross
- Lubusz
- West Pomerania

=== Did not compete ===
- Lower Silesia
- Polish Community in Argentina
- Polish Community in Australia
- Polish Community in Belarus
- Polish Community in Brazil
- Polish Community in Canada
- Polish Community in France
- Polish Community in Germany
- Polish Community in Ireland
- Polish Community in Israel
- Polish Community in Lithuania
- Polish Community in Russia
- Polish Community in South Africa
- Polish Community in Sweden
- Polish Community in the U.S.
- Polish Community in Venezuela
