= Awantura o kasę =

Polish television quiz show

- Genre: Game show
- Directed by: Okil Khamidov (ep. 1–208); Konrad Smuga (ep. 209–)
- Presented by: Krzysztof Ibisz
- Theme music composer: Jan Cyrka; Gromee
- Country of origin: Poland
- Original language: Polish
- No. of episodes: 304

Production
- Running time: 55 minutes (ep. 1) ca. 40–45 minutes (ep. 2–191) ca. 33 minutes (ep. 192–208) ca. 50 minutes (ep. 209–)
- Production company: ATM Grupa

Original release
- Network: Polsat
- Release: November 4, 2002 – February 25, 2005
- Release: October 5, 2024 – present

Awantura o kasę (lit. 'Brawl Over Money') is a Polish game show that aired on Polsat between November 4, 2002, and February 25, 2005 and was revived on the network on October 5, 2024. The format features teams of contestants answering questions from a randomly selected category, with the right to respond determined through a bidding process against rival teams. The winning team of each episode remains in the competition as Champions until defeated by another team. It has been continuously hosted by Krzysztof Ibisz.

In the game show, contestants could win an unlimited amount of money as well as prizes such as famous Polish pickled cucumbers (a symbol of defeat), tickets to festivals, scooters, cars, gold, and even diamonds. The show is currently shown every weekend (Saturday and Sunday) at 16.30 (CET +1) on the Polish television station Polsat. Under the Polish licence of the format, granted by the ATM Grupa, a local version of the show also aired in the New Zealand in 2005, using the title Cash Battle.

== Game rules ==
=== Round 1 ===
Three four member teams named blue, green, and yellow compete against each other. Each team starts the game with PLN 10,000 (PLN 5,000 in the first run of the programme). They bid on questions coming from randomly chosen categories (by spinning the categories wheel placed in front of the host), and each team has a captain who bids on behalf of the team.

Each auction begins with PLN 500 (PLN 200 in the original run). This auction is an all-pay auction, such that all money bid by the teams goes to the pool, regardless of whether the team wins the bid or not. The minimum overbid increment is PLN 100, and bid amounts must be multiples of PLN 100. The team that declares the highest amount of money answers the question. A team is automatically given the right to answer the question if they bet their entire bank account (go all in – "va banque"), or if their bid is higher than any other team's total.

The team that won the bid is given 60 seconds to confer. If they answer the question correctly, they win all the money from the pool; if they don't come up with a correct answer, the pool is carried over to the next question.

There are several "hint" spaces on the category wheel; when one is landed on, a hint is auctioned off in the same manner as questions. A hint is a set of four multiple choice answer options. Any money bid in an auction for a hint is removed from play. The team that wins the bid on a hint may use it on any future question.

In addition to the hint spaces on the wheel, contestants are always allowed to negotiate with the host the price of a hint. During negotiations, the response timer is paused. If the hint is purchased, the response timer is reset back to 60 seconds. Otherwise, the remaining time continues from the point at which the countdown had been interrupted. The teams that bet 'va banque' can't buy a hint because they have no money left in their balance, although if they have previously purchased a hint due to it appearing on the category wheel, they may use it in this case.

In some cases, when there is a significant difference in the money balance between the two teams, the host may choose to contribute additional funds from his own pocket to the prize pool. This is intended to make the game more exciting and provide the losing team with a chance to take the lead. This usually happens in the final round, although it has occasionally occurred in the first round. In the 2024 run, the additional funds are explicitly drawn from money removed from the game by the host for hint purchases, black box purchases, penalties, etc.

If a team's money balance falls below PLN 600 (or PLN 300 in the original run) after the question, the team will no longer be able to place bids. Therefore, the team is eliminated from the game and receives the rest of their saved money. If a team fails to participate in the auction for a question despite having the opportunity, the presenter will either issue a warning for passivity (for the first offense) or impose a penalty by reducing the team's account balance. The amount of the penalty depends on the team's total funds and the pool prize. The presenter may impose a penalty without a warning if the team has deliberately tried to avoid to participate in the action. In extreme cases, the presenter may even bankrupt the offending team outright, thus disqualifying them. On the other hand, if a team is unable to bid due to another team immediately going "va banque" or bidding more than the non-bidding team has, the host will usually not issue a penalty. The highest "penalty for passivity" in the history of the show was PLN 10,000.

The first round ends after seven (six (Note: Eight in episodes 1–6.) in the first run) questions have been asked or if two of the teams go bankrupt. The team with the highest amount of money moves to the final round. Teams that didn't advance to the Final Round win whatever is left on their accounts.

=== Final Round ===
The team that won the first round and the team that won the previous episode (known as the Champions) play by similar rules. The challenging team begins the round with the money they won in Round 1, while the Champions begin with the amount they scored after the first round on the first episode they appeared in.

The team with the highest score (i.e., the most money in their account) after seven questions are asked advances to the next episode as the new champions. The game may end earlier if one of the teams goes bankrupt or chooses to play va banque when bidding on a black/golden box. In a case of a tie, the show is won by the current Champions team. As in the first round, if the final question is answered and money remains in the pool, the winning team automatically receives the remaining amount. Champions stay on the show until they lose in a future episode. Their winnings add up over the episodes and are shown at the end of each one.

The Champions’ team members wear traditional graduation cap and black gown outfits.

=== Categories ===
Each category is represented by a single wedge on the wheel, with the exception of 'Hint', 'Curiosities' (first release), and 'What is it?' (second release), each of which occupies three wedges.

==== First run (2002–2005) ====
- Anatomy of the human body
- Astronomy
- Biology
- Chemistry
- Classical music
- Culinary arts
- Curiosities
- Polish cinema
- Fishing
- Football (soccer)
- General history
- Geography of Poland
- Geography of the world
- Grammar and spelling
- History of art
- History of Poland
- Mathematics
- Miscellaneous from around the world
- Automotive
- Myths and ancient history
- Philosophy and religions
- Physics
- Polish popular music
- Polish literature
- Polish TV series
- Politics of the world
- Proverbs
- Sports
- World cinema
- World popular music
- World literature

==== Second run (2024–) ====
- Anatomy and medicine
- Art
- Astronomy
- Automotive
- Biology
- Chemistry
- Cinema
- Classical music
- Contemporary times
- Cooking
- Popular music
- Fishing
- Football (soccer)
- Geography
- History
- Literature
- Mathematics
- Miscellaneous
- Philosophy and religions
- Physics
- Polish language
- Politics and economy
- Pop culture
- Proverbs and quotes
- Sport
- Technology
- TV series
- What is it? (Note: Hold the same purpose as for “curiosities” category from first release, but under the different name.) (Note: The show's assistant presents a random object, and the team's task is to identify and name the object.)
- Take what you want (Note: From episode 272. After this category gets picked, the team which bids the category gets to choose one of the categories from the wheel (except Hint, What is it? or Duel).)

=== Special categories ===
==== Hint ====
Appears on the host's wheel on three wedges and only in Round 1.

Questions selected from a drawn category did not include multiple-choice options; instead, they were open-ended. The hint contained four answer options, one of which is correct. Unlike other auctions, money bid by teams is removed from play instead of being added to the pool. The hint is not counted as a question and therefore does not contribute toward reaching the required total of seven questions.

The team that wins a hint during the auction is allowed to use it at any time, including in later episodes. Additionally, teams were permitted to sell unused hints to other teams. In the second run of the show, unused hints did not carry over to the next episodes and were lost. Teams were no longer able to trade hints with each other.

==== Duel (Toe-to-Toe) ====
The "Duel" appeared on the host's wheel on two wedges, replacing two wedges of "Curiosities" category. In the second run, 'What is it?' is replaced by Duel. The Duel only appears in the Final Round.

Each team designates one member to take part in a duel. These two players are asked to move to a buzzer podium equipped with two buttons: red for the Champions team and green for the winner of Round 1. The teams then take turns eliminating seven categories from the list displayed on a jumbotron, leaving only one category to be played. The ante for the duel is a flat PLN 500 from each team; this is added to the existing money in the pool, if any, and as usual, the host has the option of adding money to the pool. The host reads the question, and the first player to buzz in has the opportunity to answer the question. If they answer correctly, the team wins the pool, while the opponent goes to the penalty box, and the losing team plays shorthanded. If the player gives an incorrect answer, or does not answer within 15 seconds, the answering player goes to the penalty box, and the pool carries over to the next question. If neither player buzzes in within 30 seconds, both of them go to the penalty box, and the pool is carried over to the next question.

A player in the penalty box can be bought out in any moment by their team via bargaining with the host (in a way similar to asking for a hint). In the original run, the winning team was brought back to full strength at the end of the game, however, currently, if a shorthanded team wins, the player in the penalty box remains there until bought out, and may remain in the penalty box for multiple consecutive games.

As a question is being asked in a duel, it counts as one of the seven questions in the round.

==== Black Box / Golden Box ====
Appears on the host's wheel only in the Final Round: on three wedges (in the first run) or on four wedges (in the second run). The black or golden boxes category replaces the 'hint' wedges.

The Black Box (in the first run) or the Golden Box (in the second run) contains various prizes, e.g.: cash, cars, (Note: First champions in the second run of the programme received a BMW 1 Series (F40).) Harley-Davidson motorcycles (only in the first run), scooters, diamonds, gold bars, or even joke prizes such as PLN 1 or a pickle. (Their total value in Series 1 of the second run amounts to over PLN 1.5 million.) There was also the chance of winning tickets to Polsat SuperHit Festival (second run only). It is also possible for one box to have multiple prizes inside.

The Black/Golden Box is bid on in the same way as a question, meaning whoever offers the most money wins it. The Box is not considered part of a round (question), and subsequent questions will still be asked. Since the second run of the show, the team that wins the box can choose between two Golden Boxes (and two Golden Boxes can be bid on during one show); this was not the case in the first run, as one Black Box was being brought in by a cast member. The boxes are always opened at the end of the game, if the team wins it.

=== First Champions teams ===
Since the first episode didn't have a proper returning champion, the Champions team was made up of biggest winners from the previous game show hosted by Ibisz, Życiowa szansa (the Polish version of the then-popular Chance of a Lifetime).

For the first episode of the second run of the programme, best team chosen during casting was invited as the Champions team.

== Transmissions ==
First run

Episodes	Season	Start date	End date
1–91	2002/2003	November 4, 2002	June 26, 2003
92–191	2003/2004	September 1, 2003	June 27, 2004
192–200	Fall 2004	September 3, 2004	October 29, 2004
201–208	Winter 2005	January 7, 2005	February 25, 2005

Second run

Series	Episodes	Season	Start date	End date	Viewers (thousands)	SHR (Note: Participation in the general group 4+.)	Source
1	209–226 (18)	Fall 2024	October 5, 2024	December 1, 2024	882	8.6%	
2	227–248 (22)	Spring 2025	March 1, 2025	May 11, 2025	790	8.4%	
3	249–271 (23)	Fall 2025	August 31, 2025	November 16, 2025	908	9.6%	
4	272–293 (22)	Spring 2026	March 7, 2026	May 24, 2026	814	8.4%	
5	294–	Fall 2026	TBA		TBD		

== International versions ==
The TV format, was exported only in one country just now, that is New Zealand.

Country	Name	Host	Channel	Airdates
New Zealand	Cash Battle	Todd Scott	TVNZ	2005

In the New Zealand version, each round was four questions, with each team starting the game with NZ$1,000. The initial amount was NZ$50 from each team and bidding was in increments of NZ$50. In the duel, NZ$200 was taken from each team, and the player who did not buzz in was automatically sent to the penalty box, regardless of whether the buzzing player answered correctly. The black box's joke prize was always a kūmara (sweet potato). Additionally, in this version, bidding on hints or the black box was never required, unlike the original Polish version, where a warning or penalty could be imposed for inactivity in any auction.

Also unlike the original Polish version, there was no champion team on the first episode. Instead, the winners of the first round were designated as the champions for the championship round; they immediately won money equal to their score from the first round; the second-place team was the designated challenger, and had their score increased to match.

Series host Todd Scott began uploading episodes of this version to his personal YouTube channel on February 23, 2026.
