= Miss Polski 2012 =

23rd Miss Polski pageant

- Date: December 8, 2012
- Presenters: Paulina Sykut-Jeżyna; Krzysztof Ibisz; Michał Koterski
- Entertainment: Tomasz Kowalski; Natalia Lesz; LemON
- Venue: Orlen Arena, Płock
- Broadcaster: Polsat
- Entrants: 22
- Placements: 10
- Withdrawals: Holy Cross; West Pomerania; Polish Community in Australia; Polish Community in Germany
- Returns: Łódź
- Winner: Katarzyna Krzeszowska; Lesser Poland

Miss Polski 2012 was the 23rd Miss Polski pageant, held on December 8, 2012. The winner was Katarzyna Krzeszowska of Lesser Poland. In addition to receiving the title Krzeszowska also received a Chevrolet car. Krzeszowska represented Poland in Miss World 2013, Miss Supranational 2014 and Miss Grand International 2015. One of the top 10 semi-finalists, Anna Moniuszko to be specific, represented the country at Miss Grand International 2013.

== Finalists ==
Represents	Candidate	Age	Height
Greater Poland	Joanna Gładysz	23	174 cm (5 ft 8.5 in)
Greater Poland	Katarzyna Kania	22	175 cm (5 ft 9 in)
Kuyavia-Pomerania	Paulina Podlewska	22	169 cm (5 ft 6.5 in)
Lesser Poland	Katarzyna Krzeszowska	22	172 cm (5 ft 7.5 in)
Łódź	Ewa Będzi	19	171 cm (5 ft 7 in)
Łódź	Ewelina Ostrowska	23	170 cm (5 ft 7 in)
Łódź	Katarzyna Tutak	23	172 cm (5 ft 7.5 in)
Łódź	Magdalena Osińska	24	173 cm (5 ft 8 in)
Lower Silesia	Kamila Gródecka	24	176 cm (5 ft 9 in)
Lower Silesia	Magdalena Tasarek	18	177 cm (5 ft 9.5 in)
Lower Silesia	Magdalena Zakrzewska	20	181 cm (5 ft 11.5 in)
Lublin	Magdalena Suproń	22	173 cm (5 ft 8 in)
Masovia	Aleksandra Podsiadły	21	176 cm (5 ft 9 in)
Masovia	Klaudia Wiśniowska	20	173 cm (5 ft 8 in)
Podlasie	Anna Moniuszko	19	175 cm (5 ft 9 in)
Podlasie	Emilia Tomkiel	21	174 cm (5 ft 8.5 in)
Pomerania	Patrycja Bagińska	19	170 cm (5 ft 7 in)
Silesia	Dalia Malara	22	174 cm (5 ft 8.5 in)
Silesia	Joanna Grzybowska	18	177 cm (5 ft 9.5 in)
Silesia	Katarzyna Berdychowska	21	177 cm (5 ft 9.5 in)
Silesia	Monika Morzyńska	20	174 cm (5 ft 8.5 in)
Warmia-Masuria	Monika Niemotko	21	180 cm (5 ft 11 in)
