= Agnieszka Hyży =

Polish journalist and TV presenter

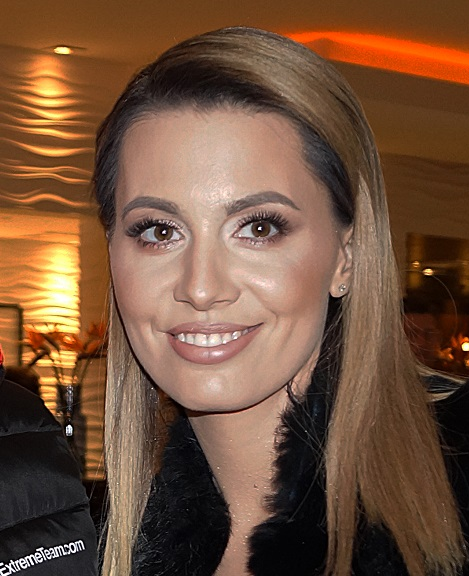
- Popielewicz, 2019
- Born: March 19, 1985 (age 41); Mysłowice, Poland
- Occupations: Journalist; TV host; model
- Years active: 2002–present
- Spouses: Mikołaj Wit (m. 2011–2014); Grzegorz Hyży (m. 2015)
- Children: 1
- Presenting career
- Station: Polsat Café
- Network: Polsat
- Country: Poland

Agnieszka Hyży (née Popielewicz; born March 19, 1985) is a Polish journalist, TV presenter and former model. Her notable work includes hosting the variety-game show Ciao Darwin and creating and hosting the Polsat Café program Super rodzinka. She has been married twice, her current spouse being Polish singer-songwriter Grzegorz Hyży. She has one daughter, who was born in 2013.

== Biography ==
Hyży was born in Mysłowice in 1985 as the only child of Thomas and Hanna Popielewicz. She grew up in Katowice, where she graduated from high school and started college. She later transferred to the University of Warsaw and graduated from the faculty of Sociology.

In 2004 Hyży started dating Marcin Mroczek, whom she met on the set of the game show Ciao Darwin. The couple broke up in 2008. Hyży married Mikołaj Wit on August 6, 2011 in the town of Biała Rawska. On February 1, 2013 their daughter Marta was born. The marriage ended in a divorce in December 2014. Hyży married Grzegorz Hyży on July 17, 2015 in Rome.

== Career ==
=== Modeling ===
Her modelling career began in 2002 when she won, along with her mother, a mother and daughter beauty contest, organized by Oriflame. Hyży was the face of the brand for the next year. Moreover, she and her mother received a special award from TVN, which was a televised trip to Egypt. The material from the trip was aired on the 500th show of the talk show host Ewa Drzyzga.

Over the next few years Hyży started doing more and more auditions in Warsaw. With the help of Bogna Sworowska, she began to work for modelling agencies. In 2004 she was invited to participate in the program Ciao Darwin, aired on channel TVN.

In 2005 she was named Miss Silesia in the Miss Polski beauty pageant. A year later, she started hosting the entertainment TV show The Club on Tele 5. That same year, she represented Poland at the Miss Tourism International in China. In the meantime, also auditioned for a role as presenter on MTV Polska.

=== Time at Polsat and other projects ===
In 2007 Hyży started working for the Polish television channel Polsat.

In early 2008, Hyży and Zygmunt Chajzer started hosting the show Gwiezdny cyrk. In April of that year, she starred in an episode of the third season of the program Jak oni śpiewają, where she sang a duet with Dariusz Kordek performing the song "Felicita". In June she became the face of an advertising campaign by Fashion House. At the end of the year, she co-hosted the international beauty contest Miss Intercontinental 2008 along with Zygmunt Chajzer and Jakub Klawiter.

In the spring of 2010 she replaced Ewelina Kopic as the new talk show hostess for Grunt on the channel Polsat Café. In 2011 she was a guest reporter on an episode of Hotel 52. In December 2012 she was one of the hosts of the gala to celebrate the 20th anniversary of Polsat.

From 2012 to 2013 she hosted the wedding sections of the TV show Studio Weekend. In January 2013 Hyży started the website PowiedzmyTak.pl, which contains celebrity wedding news and wedding advice.

In the spring of 2014 Hyży started a new program called Super rodzinka (Super Folks) on the channel Polsat Café. The show stars Polish celebrities and their families. In March of the same year she started taping behind-the-scenes episodes of Taniec z gwiazdami (the Polish version of Dancing with the Stars). These episodes aired immediately after the actual show.

While working at Polsat, Hyży has hosted numerous events organized by the station, including Sopot TOPtrendy Festival, Sopot Top of the Top Festival, Polsat superhit Festival and New Year's Eve concerts.

== Television filmography ==
- 2004–05: Ciao Darwin (TVN) – lead host
- 2006: The Club (Tele 5) – show host
- 2007–12: Się kręci (później Się kręci na żywo) (Polsat) – show co-host
- 2008: Gwiezdny Cyrk (Polsat) – show co-host
- 2010–11: Grunt to rodzinka (Polsat Café) – show host
- 2012–13: Studio Weekend (Polsat) – wedding sections host
- 2014: Super rodzinka (Polsat Café) – show host
- 2014: Kulisy Tańca z gwiazdami (Polsat Café) – host of behind-the-scenes
