= Krzysztof Ibisz =

Polish game show host and television personality

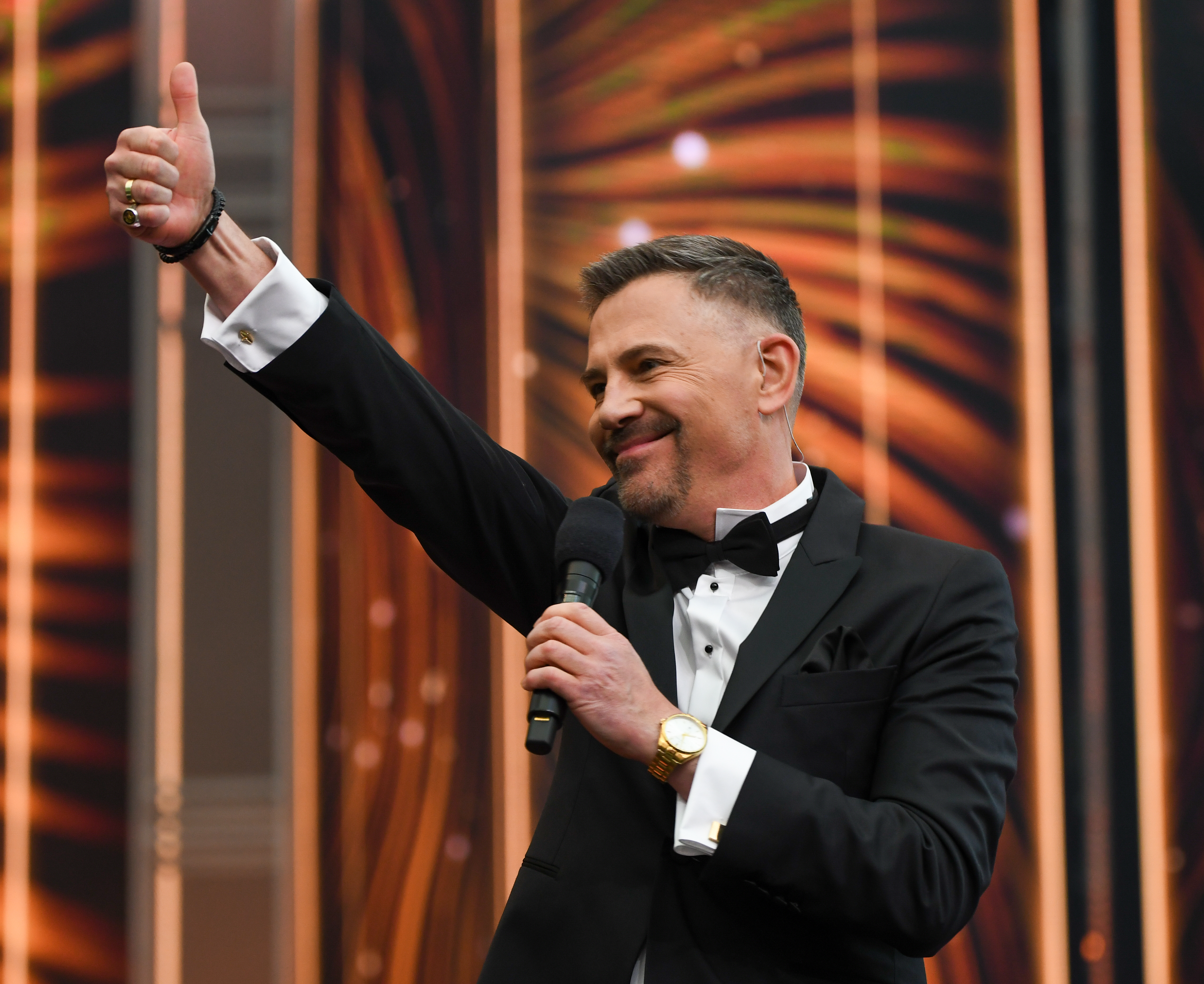
Krzysztof Ibisz (2023)

Krzysztof Ibisz ([ˈibiʂ], born 25 February 1965 in Warsaw) is a Polish game show host and television personality. He was a member of Polish Beer-Lovers' Party and a deputy in the Polish Sejm from 1991 to 1993.

He hosted the following Polish game shows (among other programs):

- Czar par (1993–1996)
- Życiowa szansa (2000–2002)
- Awantura o kasę (2002–2005; 2024-)
- Rosyjska ruletka (2003–2004)
- Gra w ciemno (2005–2007)
- Gdzie jest Kłamczuch? (2008–2009)
- Dancing with the Stars. Taniec z gwiazdami (2014–)
- Joker (2017–2018)
- Łowcy Nagród (2020–)
- The Real Housewives of Warsaw (2023)
