= Aiday Isaeva =

Kazakh beauty pageant titleholder (born 1989)

- Born: 19 April 1989 (age 37); Alma-Ata, Kazakh SSR, Soviet Union
- Height: 1.74 m (5 ft 8 1/2 in)
- Beauty pageant titleholder
- Title: Miss Kazakhstan 2013
- Hair color: Black
- Eye color: Black
- Major competitions: Miss Kazakhstan 2013 (Winner); Miss Universe 2014 (Unplaced)

Aidai Isaeva (Айдай Исаева, born 19 April 1989 in Alma-Ata) is a Kazakh beauty pageant titleholder. She was crowned Miss Kazakhstan 2013. Isaeva represented Kazakhstan at the Miss Universe 2014 pageant.

== Life and career ==
Aiday studied medicine at the Kazakh National Medical University.

== Pageantry ==
=== Miss Kazakhstan 2008 ===
Having the Miss Shymkent title, Aiday previously participated in Miss Kazakhstan 2008.

=== Miss Kazakhstan 2013 ===
Aiday was crowned as Miss Kazakhstan 2013 and represented Almaty at the national pageant at the Palace of the Republic in Almaty, Kazakhstan, on December 5, 2013.

=== Miss Universe 2014 ===
Aiday competed at the Miss Universe 2014 pageant but was unplaced.

Awards and achievements
Preceded by Zhazira Nurimbetova	Miss Kazakhstan; 2013	Succeeded by Regina Vandysheva

Awards and achievements
Preceded by Aygerim Kozhakanova	Miss Universe Kazakhstan; 2014	Succeeded by Regina Valter
