= Boris Derevensky =

Russian writer

- Born: 30 June 1962 (age 64); Kentau, Soviet Union
- Citizenship: Russia
- Education: Abai Kazakh National Pedagogical University
- Occupations: Writer, historian
- Writing career
- Period: 1991–present
- Genres: short story, novella, novel, historical research

Boris Derevensky (Russian: Бoри́с Дереве́нский; born 30 June 1962) is a Russian writer, best known for his publication of a popular omnibus "Jesus Christ in the Documents of History" (Russian: «Иисус Христос в документах истории»), which had several reissues (1st publication – 1998, 7th publication – 2013). Derevensky also has publications in different literary magazines and collective books.

== Biography ==
Boris Derevensky was born on 30 June 1962, in a family of an electrical engineer in the Kentau (South of Kazakhstan). He was the elder of two brothers. His father's bloodline included Ural Cossacks.

In 1981–1986, he studied at Abai Kazakh National Pedagogical University (Alma Ata); his major was history and Soviet law. After graduating, he worked as a staff correspondent in such newspapers as "Kentau’s truth", "Shymkent Panorama" and as a news anchor at "Ikar" TV studio in Kentau. It was the time of his first literary experience as well.

His debut as a writer took place in 1991 in Shimkent, when his booklet "Afterworld: Legends. Evidence. Facts” came out. At the same time, he became interested in the history of the ancient world. In 1996, “Lenizdat” published his novels “Herod and Cleopatra” and “Fatale Monstrum”, both dedicated to famous Egyptian empress Cleopatra VII. His historical essay “Women at the fate of Marc Anthony" was printed in the appendix of the novel.

The same year, he started working with Historical reliability of the Gospels and wrote a novella in two parts "Pilate" (1996) and several short stories. However, what Boris considered to be the most important was the publication of an omnibus of historical documents dedicated to Jesus Christ. After laborious work of gathering and translating the materials (part of which had never been published before), the omnibus "Jesus Christ in the Documents of History" came out in 1998 in Saint-Petersburg Publishing House "Aletheia". Impartially, as a true researcher, Derevensky published it, providing detailed commentaries to various documents: evidences of Jewish, Greek and Roman writers of the 1st and 2nd centuries; extracts from the works of early Christian authors; stories from New Testament apocrypha; messages from Talmud and Midrash. A separate chapter was dedicated to Muslim literature, which narrated about Prophet ‘Isa Ibn Maryam. Many fabrications on the subject of Gospel were also included in this book.

During interviews and discussions, Derevensky claimed that this book should be a desk book for Biblical scholars and everyone who is interested in the History of Christianity. Indeed, the omnibus was accepted by a large readership with great interest. This book has been quoted from by historians specializing in Christianity, as well as by divines. However, the book has also drew criticism from those who were not happy with the fact that many apologetic statements were there along with antichristian extracts from the Talmud sources, which happened to be the historical documents. The omnibus included three versions of translation of the Jewish anti-Gospel "Toledot Yeshu" – something that had never been published in Russia before (see also: Yeshu). The 5th, extended and revised edition of the omnibus (2007) considers almost all critical comments and suggestions which were found in the scientific literature.

“Doctrine of Antichrist in ancient times and Middle Ages" (2000) is another work by Derevensky, which also attracted the attention of historians and divines. It seemed natural that, after writing about the figure of Christ, the theologian-writer turned to the figure of His hell-twin – the Antichrist. In 2007, the Saint-Petersburg Publishing House "Amphora" published the revised edition of this work – "The book of Antichrist".

By this time, Publishing House "Amphora" became quite aware of Derevensky's attraction to Islam and his respect towards Muslim tradition. In 2009, this Publishing House published one more omnibus of documents: “Muslim Jesus. Gospel tradition in Islam”. In an atmosphere of strained relations between the West and East civilizations, when in the Western eye Islam became a hostile, aggressive religion, Derevensky tried to show how close Islam and Christianity in actuality are to each other ("Islam is as close to Christianity as no other religion"), how much the Muslims had embraced from Gospel legends and how much they were imbued with the doctrine of the Messiah-Christ.

== List of the main publications ==
=== Books ===
- Herod and Cleopatra / Ирод и Клеопатра; Fatale Monstrum / Фатале монструм. Lenizdat, 1996. 640 p. ISBN 5-289-01783-6
- Pilate / Пилат (1996) New Journal, 4, 1996. P. 3–43. ISSN 0869-2459
- Jesus Christ in the Documents of History / Иисус Христос в документах истории Aletheia Publisher, 2013. 576 p. ISBN 978-5-91419-817-3
- Doctrine of Antichrist in ancient times and Middle Ages / Учение об Антихристе в древности и средневековье Aletheia Publisher, 2000. 528 p. ISBN 5-89329-279-0
- Muslim Jesus / Мусульманский Иисус Amphora Publisher, 2009. 271 p. ISBN 978-5-367-01129-6
- Secrets of the Gospel history / Тайны евангельской истории Aletheia Publisher, 2014. 434 p. ISBN 978-5-90670-570-9
- The book of Antichrist / Книга об Антихристе Palmyra Publisher, 2016. 653 p. ISBN 978-5-521-00065-4
- Kill Marat's. Maria Sharlote Corde’s Case / Убить Марата. Дело Марии Шарлотты Корде Aletheia Publisher, 2017. 720 p. ISBN 978-5-906980-07-6
