= Kentau City Administration =

Administrative body in Turkestan region, Kazakhstan

Kentau City Administration (Kazakh: Кентау Галасы әкимдігі, romanized: Kentau Galasy ákımdigi, Russian: Кентауская городская администрация, romanized: Kentauskaya gorodskaya administratsiya) is an administrative body in the Turkestan region of Kazakhstan. The administrative center of this body is situated in the city of Kentau. On July 27, 2018, the body had incorporated twelve more districts to its jurisdiction which are - Babaykurhanskyy, Zhibekzholynskyy, Zhuynetskyy, Iaskyy, Karashytskyy, Novoikanskyy, Sauranskyy, Staroikanskyy, Uranhayskyy, Ushkayitskyy, Chahynskyy and Chernatskyy. The total geographical area signifying the jurisdiction of the body is 7,217.45 square kilometers.

== District wise population ==
District Name	Population in 1999	Population in 2009
Kentau	55521	57121
Achisai	3839	2176
Babaykurgan	5892	6467
Bayaldir	2093	1528
Zhibekzholinsky	2047	2205
Zhuynets	6954	8646
Iasi	397	589
Kantaha	9587	6364
Karashytsya	6629	8267
Karnatsky	11438	14295
Novoikansky	5220	6253
Sauran village	3541	3285
Old Ikan	11277	14924
Urangay	7086	8788
Ushkaitsky	5222	5447
Chagin	6723	8856
Chernatsky	9495	11102
