= Zhazira =

Zhazira or Jazira (Kazakh: Жазира) is a Kazakh feminine given name. It means "Spring landscape of the steppe". This name is the name given to girls by Kazakhs because it creates a beautiful landscape with dense green plants and red tulips covering the steppe, especially in the spring months of April and May.

Notable people with the name include:

- Zhazira Nurimbetova (born 1991), Kazakh beauty pageant titleholder.
- Zhazira Zhapparkul (born 1993), Kazakhstani weightlifter.
