= Industrialization in Kazakhstan =

Industrialization in Kazakhstan was a process of accelerated expanding the country's industrial capacity from 2010 to 2022, aimed at reducing its economic lag behind developed nations. The industrialization policy was initiated by President Nursultan Nazarbayev and implemented through several five-year government programs.

== History ==
=== Background ===
The need for diversifying Kazakhstan's economy away from a raw-materials base was first highlighted in the Kazakhstan-2030 development program, presented in 1997 by President Nursultan Nazarbayev. He emphasized the importance of sustainable growth through diversified production:

Sustainable growth can be achieved by diversifying production. Under fierce competition and a liberal import regime, industries and entire sectors are adapting to the market, but our products, apart from raw materials, remain uncompetitive globally. This is driving us increasingly toward a heavy reliance on raw materials, while the developed and developing world is moving in the opposite direction. The decline in production and its regressive structure is a doubly dangerous factor that can no longer be ignored. A truly free market will create new industries in our country. Our goal is to present Kazakhstan to the world as an attractive place for investment and to actively attract investors in key sectors.

In 2008, Kazakhstan was affected by the Great Recession, which severely weakened its export potential as oil prices fell fourfold and metal prices halved. The national currency, the tenge, depreciated sharply. However, by 2009, Kazakhstan's economy had grown by 1.1%, with industrial growth at 1.7%. During this period, President Nazarbayev directed the government to develop the State Program of Accelerated Industrial and Innovative Development (SPIID) and the country's Industrialization Map. The president urged the government to focus on seven priority sectors:

- agriculture and agro-processing,
- construction industry and materials,
- oil refining and oil and gas infrastructure,
- metallurgy and production of finished metal goods,
- accelerated development of the chemical, pharmaceutical, and defense industries,
- energy,
- transportation and telecommunications infrastructure.

=== First five-year period (2010–2014) ===
The first five-year phase of industrialization under SPIID began in 2010. Through projects on the Industrialization Map, Kazakhstan launched over 500 new types of products. In mechanical engineering, for example, Tulpar-Talgo LLP started manufacturing passenger railroad cars, Locomotive Assembly Plant JSC began locomotive production, Electrovoz Kurastyru Zauyty LLP started producing electric locomotives, Prommashkomplekt LLP produced railway turnouts and solid-rolled wheels, Saryarka AutoProm LLP manufactured SsangYong Nomad, JAC, Iveco, Hyundai, and Chevrolet Niva vehicles through semi-knockdown assembly, Kamaz-Engineering JSC produced Kamaz trucks and special equipment, Kentau Transformer Plant JSC manufactured electrical transformers, Karlskrona LLP produced pumping equipment, and Maker LLP manufactured mining equipment.

During the first five years of SPIID, the plan was to implement 294 projects worth 8.1 trillion tenge (over 40% of the country's GDP), creating 161,000 permanent jobs and an additional 207,000 during the construction phase.

Business support was provided through tools like concessional loans, leasing, innovation and export grants, and service support. In the second phase of SPIID, efforts focused on attracting multinational corporations to the processing sector to create export goods and bring Kazakhstan onto global markets.

Progress in industrialization was regularly reviewed during nationwide televised conferences held as part of Industrialization Day at the Palace of Independence in Astana, with Nazarbayev in attendance. During these events, the president personally inaugurated new industrial facilities in the country's regions. Under the Industrialization Map projects, Kazakhstan began producing more than 500 new types of products. In mechanical engineering, for example, Tulpar Talgo LLP established passenger railcar production; Lokomotiv Kurastyru Zauyty JSC began manufacturing locomotives; Elektrovoz Kurastyru Zauyty LLP started producing electric locomotives; Prommashkomplekt LLP began manufacturing railway switches, crossings, and solid-rolled wheels; SaryarkaAvtoProm LLP established assembly operations for several automobile brands; KAMAZ-Engineering JSC began producing trucks and specialized vehicles; and the Kentau Transformer Plant JSC manufactured electrical transformers.

Summarizing the results of the first five-year period during a televised conference in 2015, Nazarbayev stated that the program had provided a successful model of crisis response: the manufacturing sector had received nearly 70% of all foreign investment in the economy, while labor productivity in manufacturing had increased by 60%.

=== Second five-year period (2015–2019) ===
The State Program of Industrial and Innovative Development (SPIID) for 2015–2019 was approved by Nazarbayev's Decree No. 874 of 1 August 2014.

Like the first five-year period, the second began amid an economic crisis. Unlike the previous phase, however, the government abandoned its policy of supporting all industries and instead concentrated on a limited number of priority sectors.

Businesses received support through preferential loans and leasing arrangements, innovation and export grants, and business support services. Measures were also introduced to attract multinational corporations to the processing sector in order to develop export-oriented products.

=== Conclusion ===
In 2019, the third State Program of Industrial and Innovative Development for 2020–2025 was adopted. However, it was discontinued in 2022 as part of a reform of the national strategic planning system.

== Results and assessments ==
Overall, approximately 1,300 projects were commissioned during the implementation of Kazakhstan's industrialization programs, primarily in agriculture and food processing, the construction industry, and mechanical engineering. These projects were worth a total of 8 trillion tenge and created more than 120,000 permanent jobs.

The manufacturing sector's share of total industrial output increased from 31.8% in 2010 to 36% by the end of 2018, while its contribution to GDP reached 11.9%. In 2012, Kazakhstan entered the group of the world's 50 largest economies by GDP.

Assessments of the programs' outcomes differed. Critics pointed out that, despite the industrialization program, manufacturing growth slowed during the first phase, while the sector's share of GDP declined from 11.3% in 2010 to 10.9% in 2013. Some newly constructed facilities remained idle.

Supporters of the program argued that it had prevented a sharp decline in employment during the economic crisis and had proved more effective than previous government initiatives, although its contribution to economic diversification fell short of expectations.
