= Eduarda Velk =

Kazakhstani taekwondo practitioner

Personal information
- Nationality: Kazakhstani
- Born: 17 April 2002 (age 24) Kentau, Kazakhstan

Sport
- Sport: Shotokan

Eduarda Denisovna Velk (Russian: Эдуарда Денисовна Вельк; born 17 April 2002) is a Kazakhstani shotokan athlete. She is a two-time world champion in shotokan, having won two gold medals at the World Shotokan Karate Championship in 2012 in Sydney.

Velk was born in Kentau in 2002. Her family is originally of German origin, having emigrated to Kazakhstan in the 18th century. She was named after one of her grandfathers. Velk was introduced to shotokan at a young age by her other grandfather.

Velk earned her first gold medal at the age of seven and had by 2019 earnt 117 gold, 25 silver and eight bronze medals in different competitions and tournaments. In 2017 she enrolled at the Novosibirsk College of Olympic Reserve in Novosibirsk, Russia. She holds the shotokan titles of "Champion of Kazakhstan" and "Champion of Central Asia". She is a member of Kazakhstan's national shotokan team.

In 2019, Velk was named as one of Kazakhstan's 100 New Faces, an initiative to highlight the stories of 100 successful and influential people in Kazakhstan since the country's independence in 1991, with a focus on young people who had made special contributions to culture, medicine, business or society.
