= Cristy Spencer =

- Born: Praia, Cape Verde
- Beauty pageant titleholder
- Title: Miss World Cape Verde 2013 Miss ECOWAS 2013
- Hair color: Black
- Eye color: Black
- Major competitions: Miss World Cape Verde 2013 (winner); Miss World 2015 (withdrew)

Cristy Spencer is a Cape Verdean model and beauty pageant titleholder. She holds the title Miss Cape Verde 2013.

== Earlier Life ==
Spencer works as a model and also studied Marketing and Publicity.

== Pageants ==
Miss Cape Verde 2015

Spencer was crowned Miss World Cape Verde 2015 at the conclusion of the Miss Cabo Verde 2015 pageant. The pageant was held on August 27, 2015 at the National Auditorium.

== Miss World 2015 ==
Cristy represented Cape Verde at Miss World 2015 on Sanya, China on December 19, 2015 however, it withdrew because of lack of fund

== Miss ECOWAS 2013 ==
Cristy Spencer was elected Miss ECOWAS (Economic Community of West African States) on the weekend of December 14 & 15, 2013. She was crowned by her predecessor, Guinea's Mariama Diallo and received a $6,000 US dollars in prize money.
