= Effects of time zones on North American broadcasting =

Broadcast scheduling by regional time zone differences

Map of time zones in Canada and the United States

The scheduling of television programming in North America (namely the United States, Canada, and Mexico) must cope with different time zones. The United States (excluding territories) has six time zones (Hawaii–Aleutian, Alaska, Pacific, Mountain (including MST), Central and Eastern). Canada has five time zones (Mountain, Central, Eastern, Atlantic, and Newfoundland). Mexico has four time zones (Southeast, Central, Pacific, and Northwest). In addition, each country has further variation across these zones in the observance of daylight saving time. This requires broadcast and pay television networks in each country to shift programs in time to show them in different regions.

== In Canada ==
=== Broadcast networks ===
Canadian broadcasting networks, with five time zones and a much larger percentage of their audience residing in the Mountain Time Zone than in the Central Time Zone, are sometimes able to avoid the issues that affect American programming by airing pre-recorded programs on local time. CBC Television and CTV created delay centres in Calgary in the early 1960s to allow programming to air in each time zone based on the region.

In order to protect local advertising revenue, the simsub rules allow broadcast stations to require feeds of U.S. broadcast stations on local pay television to be substituted with the Canadian station's signal if they are airing the same program. This can affect how commercial broadcasters schedule their programming outside of Eastern, Central, and Pacific Time areas: the Atlantic and Mountain time zones are one hour ahead of the U.S. stations historically carried on television providers in their respective markets (such as Boston in Atlantic Canada, and Spokane in Alberta), meaning that stations may air programs out of pattern in comparison to other markets to maximize simsub opportunities (such as an 8 p.m. PT program airing at 9 p.m. MT),

Saskatchewan does not observe Daylight Saving Time, instead observing Central Standard Time year-round. This matches Mountain Daylight Time when DST is in effect; networked stations generally follow the schedules of their sister stations in Manitoba year-round, except delayed by one hour.

Unlike in the United States, virtually all live events, including live entertainment shows and sports television, are simultaneously broadcast nationwide in Canada. For instance, live shows in Canada are aired to the entirety at the same time in all time zones based on Eastern time. Several live U.S. shows are also aired simultaneously in all of Canada, including for viewers on the Pacific Coast (unlike in the United States, where some viewers on the same side of the continent depend on tape-delayed broadcasts for some otherwise live events). Conversely, live shows aired in Canada are frequently televised simultaneously for some viewers in the U.S. with access to Canadian broadcast networks.

=== Cable and satellite channels ===
The vast majority of specialty cable and satellite television channels in Canada each operate a single feed which is distributed in all time zones. This includes all French-language channels, as they predominantly serve Francophone areas of the country, mostly in Quebec (almost all of which observes Eastern Time). Even many long-standing specialty channels with a general entertainment format use a single national feed, though in many cases they will repeat core primetime programming three hours after first broadcast, such that programs can be promoted as airing at the same time in both the Eastern and Pacific time zones.

Some specialty channels do operate two separate broadcast feeds for Eastern and Western Canada. The Eastern feed airs programs on an Eastern Time schedule, while the Western feed airs the same programming on a three-hour delay. The separation between feeds is typically implemented at the border between Manitoba and Ontario, which may result in a program that airs at 10:00 p.m. Eastern Time in Ontario not airing in Manitoba until midnight CT (whereas an equivalent program in the U.S. would typically be available at 9:00 p.m. for Central Time viewers). However, one channel, the Aboriginal Peoples Television Network, implements the separation at the border between Manitoba and Saskatchewan.

=== Watershed and safe harbour ===
The code of ethics of the Canadian Broadcast Standards Council (CBSC) enforces a watershed, in which programs that contain coarse or offensive language or sexually explicit material intended for adult audiences may only air in the late viewing period when children are less likely to be watching, defined as 9:00 p.m. to 5:30 a.m. nightly. This can be problematic if the same content is broadcast simultaneously nationwide, as a program airing at 9:00 p.m. ET would air as early as 6:00 p.m. PT in the west. Officially, the watershed rule is applied at the signal's origin.

PrideVision (now OUTtv) was particularly affected as, from its launch in 2001 until 2005, its format included more innocuous entertainment and lifestyle programming aimed at the LGBT community during the daytime and prime time, and hardcore pornographic content in the overnight hours. Due to content concerns, many television providers marketed PrideVision as a premium, adult channel, rather than a mainstream specialty channel. Shaw Communications frustrated the ability to access a nationally-distributed free preview of PrideVision upon its launch by requiring subscribers to specifically request it, and be charged a one-cent fee (which it did not require of the 39 other fledgling digital cable channels participating in the same preview); the CRTC sided with the network's owners, requiring Shaw Cable and Star Choice to carry the Pridevision preview without additional access requirements. The network's adult programming was later spun out into a second channel so that the parent network, relaunched as OutTV, could broadcast its entertainment and lifestyle programming across its entire broadcast day.

== In the United States ==
=== Time zone feeds ===
With four time zones in the contiguous United States, American broadcast television networks generally transmit at least two separate feeds to their owned-and-operated stations and affiliates, as do cable/satellite channels: the eastern feed that is aired simultaneously in the Eastern and Central Time Zones, and the western feed that is tape-delayed three hours for those in the Pacific Time Zone. This ensures that a program, for example, that airs at 8:00 p.m. ET on the East Coast (7:00 p.m. CT) is also shown locally at 8:00 p.m. PT on the West Coast. Such a program may be advertised as "8/7c". Networks may also transmit a third feed specifically for the Mountain Time Zone, on which programs are usually broadcast on a one-hour delay from the Eastern Time Zone. Otherwise, some stations in the Mountain Time Zone use the western feed, while others get a mix of both the Eastern and Pacific feeds.

The Eastern Time Zone is commonly used as a de facto premier time for the United States as the region covered by the zone covers nearly half of the U.S. population and has the highest metropolitan area density within the country. Network promotions typically advertise airtimes either on Eastern Time only or, more commonly, in conjunction with airtimes in the Central or Pacific Time Zones.

Network stations in the Alaska and Hawaii–Aleutian Time Zones that draw from the western feed utilize the local delay scheduling approach applied to affiliate stations in the Central and Mountain zone that receive their network's eastern feed. Daytime and prime access programming is transmitted simultaneously on network affiliates in the Pacific and Alaska Time Zones; stations in the Hawaii–Aleutian Time Zone transmit a secondary local feed, on which programs are usually broadcast on a two-hour delay from the Pacific Time Zone.

=== Broadcast television ===
Effectively, the East, Mountain and West network feeds allow prime time on broadcast television networks to end at 10:00 p.m. Central, Mountain, Alaska and Hawaii–Aleutian, and 11:00 p.m. Eastern and Pacific. When it first expanded its programming into prime time in April 1987, Fox became the first major broadcast network in the U.S. to offer a common prime schedule; this type of scheduling subtracts an hour from the prime time schedule, reducing it to two hours on Monday through Saturdays and three hours on Sundays – ending evening network programming earlier than NBC, CBS and ABC did and continue to do. (Fox did expand its Sunday prime time schedule into the 10:00 p.m. timeslot in September 1987, before giving back that hour to its stations in September 1993.) UPN and The WB followed the common prime scheduling model when they both launched in January 1995; the replacements for those networks, The CW and MyNetworkTV, similarly used that model upon their launches in September 2006.

In 2009, PBS began using Internet servers instead of separate feeds for time delaying of its programming to the network's member stations. The servers imitate a delayed program feed, broadcasting the program at the correct airtime as if it were being broadcast via satellite. This was done as PBS had upgraded its main program feed to high definition (or to widescreen digital at the very least) in December 2008, but satellite capacity allowed for only Eastern and Pacific time zone feeds, prompting the removal of the Central and Mountain time zone feeds and a shared feed for Alaska and Pacific time zones in February 2009, which created complaints from PBS stations.

=== Cable and satellite television ===
Subscribers to cable or satellite television services may still only receive East Coast feeds for certain channels even if they reside on the West Coast. Providers in the Mountain Time Zone, Alaska and Hawaii may transmit either the Pacific Time Zone feed or the East Coast feed, depending on the service or channel. Some cable channels only offer one broadcast feed, where viewers see the same program in all time zones. For example, until it dropped the program in 2014, superstation-turned-basic cable channel WGN America (now NewsNation) telecast the noon (Central Time) newscast from WGN-TV in Chicago at 1:00 p.m. Eastern in Washington, D.C. and 10:00 a.m. Pacific in Los Angeles.

Broadcasters offer East and West Coast feeds of some basic cable channels for viewing in all time zones. The usage of dual feeds of the same channel is a commonplace method for premium channels such as HBO, Cinemax, Showtime and Starz, in which the Pacific time zone feed of the primary channel is packaged with the East Coast feed of the main channel and the pay service's multiplex channels, if the premium channel has any. (MGM+ subverts this as its Eastern Time feed acts as the default main channel feed available to most contracted providers and its TV Everywhere and OTT streaming platforms, while its Pacific feed is mainly restricted to systems in the Western United States.) HBO maintains a separate Hawaii–Aleutian Time feed of its primary channel; the three-hour-delayed version of the Pacific Time feed – which is exclusively carried by the state's dominant cable provider, Oceanic Spectrum – is the only Hawaii-specific timeshift feed currently maintained by an American cable-originated network. (The state's other major cable provider, Hawaiian Telcom, transmits the Pacific Time feeds of all seven HBO channels, which Oceanic also packages with the main channel's Hawaii–Aleutian Time feed.)

Most commonly, the Eastern and Pacific Time Zone feeds of only the main channel are packaged together, although some providers may also provide both coastal feeds of a premium service's multiplex channels. In some cases, cable networks that do not offer a separate west coast feed (such as news channels, unless airing live breaking news coverage) may schedule same-night encores of their prime time programming that correspond with their advertised time (or one hour later) in the Pacific Time Zone.

In the United States, distant over-the-air broadcast stations affiliated with the six broadcast networks are offered by direct-broadcast satellite providers as well as C-band services that do not offer locally based affiliates for most individual markets, allowing viewers to choose between the east and west feeds of a given network. These designated stations are usually owned-and-operated stations or affiliates of ABC, NBC, CBS, Fox, The CW, and MyNetworkTV located in the Eastern and Pacific Time Zones (usually those based in New York City and Los Angeles such as ABC's respective O&Os [network owned-and-operated] in those markets, WABC-TV and KABC-TV). Dish Network and C-band providers also provide CW and MyNetworkTV affiliates designated as superstations (such as WPIX in New York and KTLA in Los Angeles), with Dish mainly making them available in markets where it does not carry a low-power, digital subchannel-only or non-broadcast affiliate of either network (especially in markets served by The CW's quasi-national feed for areas ranked below #98 in Nielsen Media Research market rankings, The CW Plus).

The country's two major satellite providers – DirecTV and Dish Network – only offer these de facto coastal feeds in order to provide programming from at least one network to subscribers living in smaller media markets or rural areas where a network does not have a local affiliate available on the provider, if even presently serving the given location at all. Since the services began offering local network affiliates from additional markets in the early 2000s, many local stations have successfully sued DBS providers to deny access to distant stations carrying programming from the same network as them within their markets. This differs from the subscription television model in Canada, most cable and satellite providers carry distant over-the-air broadcast stations from the U.S. (consisting of both affiliates of the Big Four broadcast networks and minor network affiliates classified as superstations), in addition to O&Os and affiliates of domestically based networks.

=== Live events ===
==== News and sports ====
Most sports television programs, including other major national events, are broadcast live in all time zones across U.S. territories, but also present special problems for some specific stations. For such events, the networks may either advertise Eastern time only, or list the times in both Eastern and Pacific (e.g., "8 p.m. Eastern/5 p.m. Pacific"). As such, a live Sunday sporting event is played from 1 to 4 p.m. Pacific Time preempts local 6 p.m. newscasts on the East Coast. Likewise, a State of the Union address that is televised at 9 p.m. Eastern Time preempts local 6 p.m. newscasts on the West Coast. Similarly, as sports programs would normally air weekend afternoons on the East Coast on major TV networks and late mornings on the West Coast, the weekend editions of national morning news shows could air on the West Coast as early as 5:00 or 6 p.m. PT. News channels such as CNN and sports channels such as ESPN that frequently broadcast live events offer a single feed that airs in all time zones. About 80% of the U.S. population reside in the Central and Eastern time zones, where the nation's largest city (and the main anchor of television programming), New York, is located.

A notable exception to live telecasts in sports is the Olympic Games coverage. Although it has provided live coverage of events during other dayparts via platforms such as cable and streaming, NBC's flagship primetime coverage block typically featured tape-delayed and plausibly live presentations of events from earlier in the day. When allowed by the host's time zone or during U.S. team appearances at gold medal matches, NBC does include live coverage of selected events in the block. This practice is reflected in the actual scheduling of the Olympic events, which NBC may influence to maximize primetime viewership due to the value of its broadcast rights; at the 2008 Summer Olympics held in Beijing, the swimming finals were held in the morning local time to allow for primetime broadcasts in the Americas, but the event was aired live on the U.S. East Coast and tape-delayed in other U.S. territories despite most major markets in the Americas, Europe, Africa, Asia and Oceania regularly delivering live and unedited regular Olympic broadcast coverage based on the Olympic Broadcasting Services' simultaneous global feed. As per prior practice, this block aired in tape delay on the West Coast.

Tape delays have occurred even during Olympics held in the Americas, including the famous Miracle on Ice hockey game at the 1980 Winter Olympics in Lake Placid, New York (which ABC was unsuccessful in having rescheduled for primetime due to objections from Soviet officials, who wanted a more favorable timeslot for its local audience), and most egregiously during the 2002 and 2010 Winter Olympics in Salt Lake City and Vancouver respectively, which were both held in western North America, and 2016 Summer Olympics in Rio de Janeiro, Brazil, which was relatively situated in eastern North America time shift.

For the 2018 Winter Olympics in Pyeongchang – the first of three consecutive Games being held in Asia – NBC adopted a new format with a larger emphasis on live coverage for its primetime Olympics coverage, and announced that the main primetime window would air simultaneously in all time zones. NBC cited the "communal" experience, increased use of social media, and decades-long widespread criticism of the prior format for this transition. Following the example of Beijing 2008, all the figure skating finals were allocated to local morning times. This also applied in the 2022 Winter Olympics in Beijing.

Beginning in the 2025–26 season, NBC plans to air a weekly doubleheader of NBA games on Tuesday nights under a new broadcasting agreement. However, the games will be split regionally and feature joint live broadcasts allotted for 8 p.m. ET and 8 p.m. PT, respectively. In this arrangement, the first game would air in prime time for viewers on the East Coast, and West Coast viewers would instead see the second game. Both games will stream nationally on NBC's Peacock service, and NBC affiliates will have the option to air both games live or tape-delay only either of the games if they so choose.

==== Entertainment ====
Several entertainment shows that are broadcast live during primetime in the Eastern and Central time zones, including some that originate from Los Angeles (particularly live reality competition shows like NBC's The Voice), are tape-delayed in the Mountain and Pacific time zones, thus making it impossible for viewers in those time zones to vote after performance episodes of live reality competition shows finish airing live on the East Coast. For this reason, currently airing entertainment competition shows that originate in Los Angeles continuously face mounting pressure to switch to live simultaneous telecasts in all U.S. time zones to enable audiences to know the results at the same time across the country.

The Academy Awards, up until the early 21st century, were the only major U.S. entertainment television event to have been aired live to all continental U.S. time zones, before expanding to full nationwide U.S. live telecasts in 2019. In 2009, however, the Golden Globe Awards on NBC ushered the era of U.S. awards shows transitioning to live coast-to-coast telecasts in response to longstanding general criticisms of some live shows being televised real-time to the East Coast but tape-delayed for West Coast viewers, even when those shows originated from Los Angeles area. Viewers in the Pacific, Mountain, and Alaskan time zones had frequently complained about spoilers made by live viewers east of the Rockies during the broadcasts especially in the social media age wherein the broadcast delay protocols by networks have been steadily rendered irrelevant. While the Golden Globes has since continuously aired live on both U.S. coasts even with its transfer to CBS in 2025, the Critics Choice Awards is the only remaining precursor show leading up to the Academy Awards and the Emmy Awards to still retain their West Coast tape delays on The CW.

The Grammy Awards historically delayed its live ceremonies for West Coast viewers. In 2016, however, CBS began to allow its stations in the Western U.S. to carry the ceremony live as long as they also carried a prime time rebroadcast, before mandating all of its affiliates to air Grammys live all across the U.S. (inclusive of time zones outside the contiguous U.S.), with corresponding primetime rebroadcasts for viewers outside the Eastern and Central time zones. Despite shifting venues across the mainland U.S., most notably to Las Vegas in 2022, the Grammys have continued to use the format, making it the first major award show to have consistently aired live every year across all U.S. territories. Although the Primetime Emmy Awards, currently aired in rotation by ABC, CBS, Fox, and NBC, began airing live coast-to-coast in the U.S. in 2010, the awards show followed suit with the Grammys in airing live simultaneously outside the contiguous U.S. time zones with CBS' telecast in 2017.

Youth-oriented music specials such as the People's Choice Awards and Teen Choice Awards, continue to be held in Los Angeles and air live in the U.S. East Coast while tape-delayed elsewhere, as their airtime is often purchased as a brokered programming arrangement, which also allows standards and practices to watch the ceremony in advance and determine cuts for profanity or content to insert a bleep censor or cut-away, as well as cuts for time and superfluous items such as longer walks than expected by an award winner to the stage or a rare botched performance with the replacement of dress rehearsal footage. The Billboard Music Awards have since juggled between tape-delayed West Coast airings and live coast-to-coast U.S. telecasts since the mid-2010s, depending on the show's recent viewership changes.

National New Year's Eve specials are typically broadcast live in the Eastern and Central time zones, and tape-delayed elsewhere in the country (usually by occupying the time slot normally used for late night talk shows) so that the countdown will correspond with the local time zone. Some affiliates may preempt the late-night segment of the networked special in order to broadcast live coverage of local celebrations (such as Seattle's KING-TV, which preempts NBC's New Year's Eve special to broadcast the midnight fireworks on the Space Needle, and a special covering the America's Party fireworks in Las Vegas produced by KLAS-TV and syndicated by Nexstar Media Group stations), and it is not uncommon for stations in Central Time to air a local New Year's special immediately after the conclusion of the network special, especially if the networked special does not feature a midnight countdown for it (as has ABC's New Year's Rockin' Eve since 2017).

Occasionally, networks will produce and broadcast the same live event twice in one night – broadcasting once on an East Coast feed, and again on a West Coast feed three hours later. This permits more viewers to watch the broadcast live in prime time (although not all), as the show can air in its usual timeslot in all markets, but incurs the expense and difficulty of delivering two live broadcasts. In some cases, the two broadcasts may include intentional differences as easter eggs; while rare, the technique of multiple live broadcasts was a prominent trend for some special live episodes of scripted programs in the 1990s and 2000s during the Must-See TV era by NBC, such as the 30 Rock episodes "Live Show" and "Live from Studio 6H", Will & Grace with "Alive and Schticking", The West Wing with "The Debate", and ER's fourth-season debut with "Ambush".

Few regularly scheduled prime time shows, both scripted and non-scripted, and sports and non-sports in genre, have been aired to totality at the same time live across all continental U.S. time zones. This format, similar to aforementioned major awards shows, involves airing live on prime time or late night in the East Coast (and late afternoon hours or on prime time, simultaneously and respectively, on the West Coast) on a weekly basis due to episodic, per-season formats. NBC remains the foremost proponent of live television, with its broadcasts of Sunday Night Football and Saturday Night Live being transmitted live across the contiguous U.S. states (and for the former, including for U.S. time zones outside the mainland), with a corresponding prime time or late-night encore for viewers outside the Eastern and Central time zones.

The mechanics of the 2014 ABC series Rising Star – which allowed for live, real-time voting by viewers – would allow the insertion of live reaction segments in the event that a contestant eliminated by low vote totals in the original Eastern/Central/Mountain time zone broadcast would be saved by results watching the Pacific/Alaska broadcast, but the show was broadcast live across the mainland U.S. except the Pacific time zone. Alaskan viewers, despite only receiving delayed telecasts, were able to participate in the voting process due to having to be one hour behind of Pacific Time and having to be following schedules similar to that of Central and Mountain Time. All remaining U.S. territories outside the North American continental mainland, however, are excluded from the show's real-time voting process due to multiple-hour time differences. Moreover, ABC noted that the chances of West Coast votes differing substantially from other viewers was statistically small.

In mid-2018, American Idol became the first ever reality competition series – and first ever non-weekend regularly scheduled prime time program – in all of U.S. television to broadcast live in all U.S. territories upon its revival on ABC after its initial first-run finale on Fox in 2016, beginning with its live shows in the final stages of the competition. In this manner, viewers in all U.S. territories are enabled to both view the episodes live at the same time, with the prime time East Coast telecast coinciding with the real-time afternoon telecasts across the Pacific to Hawaii, along with real-time voting with the revealing of its results integrated at the end of the performance nights. Despite the format having been in place for the show since 2015, as part of its nationwide voting expansion, a corresponding warning for viewers outside the Eastern and Central time zones regarding the closing of the voting window will be aired upon their local prime time encore broadcasts. The format would eventually extend to include the season finale round beginning 2019, making it the first ever primetime regular series in U.S. television history to air its season finale live all across the U.S.

The emergence of the COVID-19 pandemic in the beginning of the 2020s resulted in some of the most drastic scheduling changes for major annual events on U.S. network television in the 21st century. In 2020, MTV began expanding its broadcast coverage of the Video Music Awards with its simultaneous live telecasts via The CW in all U.S. territories, and has continuously done so since its transfer to CBS in 2025. The postponement of the Tokyo Olympics to 2021 prompted the transition of NBC Olympic broadcasts to fully live nationwide telecasts of both opening and closing ceremonies for all succeeding editions regardless of timezones of hosting nations to coincide with the longstanding simultaneous live global Olympic telecasts, continuing with the network's live broadcasts of the Beijing Olympics in 2022 that lapsed with the Super Bowl in the same period. Under this revised format, which has since been credited for the viewership resurgence of the Paris Olympics in 2024, all U.S. territories outside the Central and Eastern time zones will also receive an additional tape-delayed primetime encores of the Olympic ceremonies.

2022 also marked the first time that the postponed Miss World competition began airing live in both U.S. coasts on Reelz while the Tony Awards, which are usually televised by CBS from New York City, became the last major awards show to finally transition to live nationwide U.S. broadcasts. That same year, some events previously broadcast on live television began defecting to streaming platforms catering in real time across all U.S. territories, as ABC's Dancing with the Stars made a limited simulcast with Disney+ in 2022, followed by the Miss Universe pageant (headquartered in the U.S.) with its transfer from Fox to The Roku Channel alongside live coast-to-coast telecasts with Telemundo the following year. The Screen Actors Guild Awards, which is one of the most high-profile precursor shows of the acting award races at the Academy Awards, also transferred from their live coast-to-coast telecasts on cable networks TBS and TNT in the mid-2010s to Netflix's YouTube channel beginning 2023. In 2025, the American Music Awards switched to live coast-to-coast U.S. telecasts after transferring from ABC to CBS with a shift to Las Vegas as its hosting city, marking an end to its era of historically airing on West Coast tape delays from Los Angeles or New York.

=== Effects on local programming ===
Local stations and affiliates must schedule their local and syndicated programming around their respective network's feed. Because primetime programs on the East Coast feed are simulcast in two time zones, stations in the Central Time Zone are affected differently from those in the Eastern Time Zone. An hour of syndicated programming time (between 7:00 and 8:00 p.m. in the Eastern and Pacific time zones) is lost in the Central and Mountain time zones since network primetime in those areas starts at 7 p.m., forcing stations in Mountain or Central time (or in parts of both zones) to choose between airing their 6 p.m. newscast and another syndicated or locally produced program or airing shows in blocks preferred by syndicators (for example, Wheel of Fortune and Jeopardy! together or, during the latter series's 2004–17 run, Entertainment Tonight and The Insider together).

The most common set of programming chosen by Central Time Zone stations aligned with the Big Three television networks (ABC, CBS and NBC) is to air a local newscast at 5 p.m., national news at 5:30 p.m., another local newscast at 6 p.m. and syndicated programming at 6:30 p.m., though some Fox stations that maintain a newscast schedule comparable to stations tied to the Big Three (commonly stations that were former ABC, NBC and CBS affiliates themselves) carry a 60- or 90-minute block of news from 5:00 to 6 or 6:30 p.m. with an additional half-hour of local news in the 5:30 p.m. timeslot as Fox does not air a national evening newscast; a few stations not affiliated with the Big Four networks, such as WGN-TV in Chicago, WHDH in Boston and WJXT in Jacksonville, Florida, follow a similar scheduling format with their early evening newscasts. Most Big Four affiliates in the Eastern and Pacific time zones follow this early evening newscast model as well, running a 90-minute block of news from 5 to 6:30 p.m., particularly if they run a network's national evening newscast at 6:30 p.m. Eastern and Pacific Time. Some stations, regardless of time zone, even show a newscast from 6 to 7 p.m., which, if run on a network station in the Central or Mountain time zones, would lead into primetime network programming. Some television stations (such as WKYC and WJW in Cleveland, Ohio, or WJAR in Providence, Rhode Island) have recently begun using the fact that prime time in the Eastern Time Zone begins at 8 p.m. to their advantage by carrying a newscast during the 7 p.m. hour, generally in order to attract viewers who work longer days and cannot return home to watch a 5:00 or 6 p.m. newscast. (A few stations – most notably, WIS in Columbia, South Carolina – have offered local newscasts in the 7:00 timeslot for several years prior to other Eastern Time stations expanding into that hour.)

Many stations that do not carry a newscast in the 6:00 p.m. timeslot in the Central Time Zone (commonly independent stations and most affiliates of non-historical networks like Fox – which has some stations that air a 6 p.m. newscast, though this is not entirely commonplace – The CW and MyNetworkTV) air situation comedies or other types of syndicated programming, such as reality series or game shows, during that hour. Many stations in the Central Time Zone tend to air one or both parts of the syndicated block at 5 p.m. or even earlier. Another more recent dilemma of the 7 p.m. primetime start is that a combination of longer commutes and work hours than in the past has caused many people to not come home from work until after 7 p.m., cutting into the potential ratings of shows that start at this time. Of course, the reverse is also true since simultaneous broadcasts offer viewers the chance to watch "prime time television" without having to stay awake until 11 p.m.

Local programming, such as locally produced newscasts, is not typically affected, as many stations air their morning newscast at 4:00, 4:30, 5:00 or 5:30 a.m. and their early evening newscasts at 5 or 6 p.m. (or both); however, the late evening newscast is affected due to the differences in time between time zones, meaning that if the late local news starts at 10 p.m. Central time on one network station, an affiliate of the same network in the Eastern Time Zone airs its newscast at 11 p.m.; network evening newscasts on CBS, ABC, and NBC are affected since they are usually scheduled to air at 6:30 p.m. Eastern Time (barring preemption due to network sports coverage or at the discretion of the local station, breaking news or severe weather coverage) in order to sync up with its simultaneous broadcast in the Central Time Zone. Midday newscasts are not necessarily affected, depending on whether the station's affiliated network schedules their daytime lineup simultaneously in the Eastern and Central Time Zones (as with ABC and CBS) or just to the Eastern Time Zone first (as with NBC). The late night program lineups on ABC, CBS, NBC, and Fox are also similarly timeshifted, airing a half-hour later (after a newscast or syndicated programming if the station does not run news programming) but are shifted due to the time zone differences (a bigger issue with first-run late night programs that air after 12:30 a.m. Eastern Time since the later start time may subject these programs to a potentially decreased audience). Many Fox affiliates, and some independent stations carry a prime time newscast that is similarly affected by the timeshifting of the prime time schedule, meaning that if said late evening newscast starts at 9 p.m. Mountain Time on one network station, an affiliate of the same network in the Pacific time zone would air its news at 10 p.m.

In the 2010s, KABC-TV in Los Angeles added a live broadcast of the East Coast edition of ABC's World News Tonight at 3:30 p.m. PT to compete with local programming on competing stations in that timeslot. In 2022, rival KCBS-TV announced plans to move its weekday morning newscast to sister independent station KCAL-TV and replace it with airings of the live East Coast edition of CBS Mornings, a simulcast of KCAL's morning news at 6 a.m., followed by the West Coast edition of CBS Mornings.

== See also ==
- East Coast bias
- Time shifting
