= Sabina Azimbayeva =

Kazakhstani model (born 2000)

- Born: Sabina Zairkyzy Azimbayeva; 14 February 2000 (age 26); Almaty, Kazakhstan
- Height: 1.75 m (5 ft 9 in)
- Beauty pageant titleholder
- Title: Miss Almaty 2017; Miss Universe Kazakhstan 2018
- Hair color: Black
- Eye color: Brown
- Major competitions: Miss Almaty 2017 (Winner); Miss Kazakhstan 2018 (Top 5); Miss Universe 2018 (Unplaced)

Sabina Zairkyzy Azimbayeva (Kazakh: Сабина Заирқызы Әзімбаева, Sabina Zairqyzy Äzımbaeva; born 14 February 2000) is a Kazakh model and beauty pageant titleholder who was crowned Miss Almaty 2017 and represented Kazakhstan in Miss Universe 2018. She placed in the top five at Miss Kazakhstan 2018.

== Life and career ==
Azimbayeva was born in Almaty, Kazakhstan. She is a student at the College of Almaty and works as a model by profession.

== Pageantry ==
On 13 September 2017, Azimbayeva was crowned Miss Almaty 2017 and she succeeded outgoing Miss Almaty 2016 Kamilla Asylova. She then competed at Kazakhstan 2018 and placed 1st runner-up. Since the winner of Miss Kazakhstan goes to the Miss World competition, Azimbayeva represented Kazakhstan at Miss Universe 2018 pageant.

Awards and achievements
Preceded by Kamilla Asylova	Miss Almaty; 2017	Succeeded by Kamila Kozhakhanova
Preceded by Kamilla Asylova	Miss Universe Kazakhstan; 2018	Succeeded by Kamila Kozhakhanova
