= Regina Valter =

Kazakh model (born 1995)

- Born: Regina Valter; 1995 (age 30–31); Almaty, Kazakhstan
- Height: 1.74 m (5 ft 8 1/2 in)
- Beauty pageant titleholder
- Title: Miss Almaty 2015; Miss Kazakhstan 2015; Miss Universe Kazakhstan 2016
- Hair color: Brown
- Eye color: Blue
- Major competitions: Miss Kazakhstan 2015 (Winner)

Regina Valter (Russian: Регина Валтер, born 1995) is a Kazakhstani model and beauty pageant titleholder who was crowned Miss Almaty 2015 and later placed 3rd runner-up to Alia Mergenbaeva at the Miss Kazakhstan 2015 pageant.

== Personal life ==
Regina studied at Tyumen State University of Architecture and Civil Engineering in Russia.

== Pageantry ==
Valter competed at the Miss Kazakhstan 2015 pageant and finished 3rd runner-up to Alia Mergenbaeva.

Awards and achievements
Preceded by Aiday Isaeva	Miss Universe Kazakhstan; 2015	Succeeded by Kamilla Asylova

Awards and achievements
Preceded by Aigerim Smagulova	Kazakhstan representative at the Miss Universe; 2016	Succeeded by Kamilla Asylova

Awards and achievements
Preceded by Aygerim Kozhakanova	Miss Almaty; 2015	Succeeded by Incumbent
