= Miss Kazakhstan =

Beauty pageant

Miss Qazaqstan National Beauty Pageant
- Formation: 1997; 29 years ago
- Headquarters: Almaty
- Location: Kazakhstan
- Official language: Kazakh
- President: Aiday Isaeva
- Key people: Sovet Seitov
- Affiliations: Miss Universe; Miss World; Miss Grand International
- Website: www.misskazakhstan.kz

Miss Kazakhstan (Kazakh: Мисс Қазақстан), also known as Miss Qazaqstan, is a national beauty pageant in Kazakhstan. The pageant was founded in 1997, where the winners were sent to Miss Universe, Miss World, and Miss Grand International began 2025.

== History ==
Miss Kazakhstan started in 1997 from Sovet Seitov management. Being the most prestigious national pageant, Miss Kazakhstan became the pioneer of national beauty pageants in Kazakhstan. 17 regions and 3 cities across Kazakhstan compete for the crown. Miss Kazakhstan is the national modern beauty agency in Kazakhstan which has the right to select representatives to international events such as Miss Universe (since 2006), Miss World (since 1998), and Miss Earth (since 2021).

Since 2022, former Miss Kazakhstan 2014 who is also Kazakhstan's representative at Miss Universe 2014, Aiday Isaeva has been crowned President of Miss Kazakhstan. In that year the name Miss Kazakhstan was rebranded using the local language name "Miss Qazaqstan".

== Formats ==
The Miss Qazaqstan competition is traditionally holding provincial representation every year. The 17 and 3 cities across Kazakhstan will compete for the crown. In the final result, there will be a Second Runner-up, a First Runner-up, and then finally 3 grand winners, Miss Earth Qazaqstan, Miss Universe Qazaqstan, and Miss Qazaqstan.

- Miss Abai
- Miss Akmola
- Miss Aktobe
- Miss Almaty
- Miss Astana
- Miss Atyrau
- Miss Baikonur
- Miss East Kazakhstan
- Miss Jambyl
- Miss Jetisu
- Miss Karaganda
- Miss Kostanay
- Miss Kyzylorda
- Miss Mangystau
- Miss North Kazakhstan
- Miss Pavlodar
- Miss Shymkent
- Miss Turkistan
- Miss Ulytau
- Miss West Kazakhstan

== Titleholders ==
Miss Universe Kazakhstan
Miss World Kazakhstan
Miss Earth Kazakhstan
Miss Grand Kazakhstan

=== Miss Qazaqstan ===
Year	Miss Qazaqstan	Kazakh Name	Region
1997	Dzhamilia Bisembayeva	Джемилия Бисембаева	Almaty
1998	Dana Tolesh	Дана Төлеш	Almaty
1999	Asel Isabayeva	Әсел Исабаева	Almaty
2000	Margarita Kravtsova	Маргарита кравцова	Rostov-on-Don
2001	Gulmira Mahambetova	Гүлмира Махамбетова	Almaty
2002	Olga Sidorenko	Ольга Сидоренко	Almaty
2003	Saule Zhunusova	Саили Жүнісова	Pavlodar
2004	Alexandra Kazakova	Александра Казакова	Almaty
2005	Dina Nuraliyeva	Дина Нұралиева	Shymkent
2006	Gaukhar Rakhmetaliyeva	Гаухар Рахметалиева	Almaty
2007	Alfina Nasyrova	Альфина Насырова	Almaty
2008	Olga Nikitina	Ольга Никитина	Karaganda
2009	Symbat Madyarova	Симбиан Мадярова	Almaty
2010	Zhanna Zhumaliyeva	Жанна Жұмалиева	Oral
2011	Aynur Toleuova	Айнұр Төлеуова	Taldykorgan
2012	Zhazira Nurimbetova	Жазира Нұрымбетова	Kentau
2013	Aiday Isaeva	Айдай Исаева	Almaty
2014	Regina Vandysheva	Регина Вандишева	Almaty
2015	Alia Mergenbaeva	Әлиа Мергенбаева	Aktau
2016	Gulbanu Azimkhanova	Гүлбану Әзімханова	Kyzylorda
2018	Alfiya Yersayin	Альфия Ерсайын	Atyrau
2019	Madina Batyk	Мәдина Балық	Pavlodar

=== Miss Universe Kazakhstan ===
In 2015 Sovet Seitov decided to make changes in sending the Miss Kazakhstan delegation to Miss Universe. Previously the main winner would automatically go to Miss Universe and now this has been changed to be more specific. Miss Almaty as a provincial-level organization that is considered very competitive in selecting representatives is given the mandate to select the winning representative for Miss Universe. Starting in 2015, the winner of Miss Almaty has the right to represent Kazakhstan at Miss Universe and of course the national pageant, Miss Kazakhstan. However, this format turned out to be not very significant, so in 2019 Sovet Seitov reversed the format and finally, in 2021 Miss Kazakhstan crowned 3 winners at once in their respective events, namely Qazaqstan Miss Universe, Miss World, and Miss Earth.

Year	Miss Universe Kazakhstan	Kazakh Name	Region
2015	Regina Valter	Реджина Вальтер	Almaty
2016	Darina Kulsitova	Дарина Күлситова	Semey
2017	Kamilla Asylova	Камилла Асылова	Almaty
2018	Sabina Azimbayeva	Сабина Әзімбаева	Taldykorgan
2020	Kamilla Serikbay	Камилла Серікбай	Pavlodar
2021	Aziza Tokashova	Азиза Тоқашова	Almaty

=== Miss Qazaqstan 2021-present ===
In 2021 Miss Kazakhstan Organization decided to divide the Miss Kazakhstan winner into the 3 categories; Qazaqstan Miss Universe, Qazaqstan Miss World, and Qazaqstan Miss Earth. Since 2022 the transfer of leadership to Aiday Isaeva management, a new format is being held where Kazakhstan's representative for Miss World is the winner of Miss Qazaqstan and also the representatives for Miss Universe and Miss Earth.

In 2025 Miss Qazaqstan reformatted by taking Miss Grand International license, and the organizer took back the old format where Miss Qazaqstan main winner goes to Miss Universe and also the other ones will be awarded to be Miss World and Miss Grand Qazaqstan.

Year	Qazaqstan Miss Universe	Kazakh Name	Region	Qazaqstan Miss World	Kazakh Name	Region	Miss Qazaqstan Earth	Kazakh Name	Region
2021	Aidana Akhantaeva	Айдана Ахантаева	Astana	Nazerke Karmanova	Назерке Карманова	Aktobe	Anna Glubokovskaya	Анна Глубоковская	Karaganda
Year	Miss Qazaqstan	Kazakh Name	Region	Miss Universe Qazaqstan	Kazakh Name	Region	Miss Earth Qazaqstan	Kazakh Name	Region
2022	Tomiris Kakimova	Томирис Кәкімова	Astana	Diana Tashimbetova; Dethroned	Диана Тәшімбетова	Almaty	Dilnaz Tilaeva	Дильназ Тілаева	Almaty
2022	Tomiris Kakimova	Томирис Кәкімова	Astana	Tomiris Zair; Assumed	Томирис Заир	Almaty	Dilnaz Tilaeva	Дильназ Тілаева	Almaty
2023	Sabina Idrissova	Сабина Идрисова	Astana	Madina Almukhanova	Мадина Альмуханова	Almaty	Ayaulym Alimkhaliyeva	Аяулым Алимхалиева	Almaty
2024	Bagym Baltabaeva	Багым Балтабаева	East Kazakhstan	Dana Almasova	Дана Алмасова	Kostanay	Tomiris Kadyrkhan	Томирис Кадырхан	Almaty
Year	Miss Qazaqstan	Kazakh Name	Region	Miss World Qazaqstan	Kazakh Name	Region	Miss Grand Qazaqstan	Kazakh Name	Region
2025	Alina Ekaterinecheva	Алина Екатеринечева	Shymkent	Shadiyara Baykenova	Шадияра Байкенова	Almaty	Anel Emel	Анель Йемел	Almaty

== Titleholders under Miss Qazaqstan Org. ==
=== Miss Universe Kazakhstan ===
- : Declared the winner
- : Finished as a runner-up or top 5/6 qualification
- : Finished as one of the finalists or semi-finalists
- : Finished as a special awards winner

Year	Region	Miss Qazaqstan	Kazakh Name	Placement at Miss Universe	Special awards	Notes
Aiday Isaeva directorship — a franchise holder to Miss Universe from 2022
2026	Shymkent	Alina Ekaterinecheva	Алина Екатеринечева	TBA	TBA	
2025	Kostanay	Dana Almassova	Дана Алмасова	Unplaced		
2024	Almaty	Madina Almukhanova	Мадина Альмуханова	Unplaced		
2023	Almaty	Tomiris Zair	Томирис Заир	Unplaced		Appointed — Tomiris was Vice Miss Qazaqstan 2022.
2022	Almaty	Diana Tashimbetova	Диана Тәшімбетова	Did not compete		Withdrew — Due to a lack of sponsorship and issues with the organization, Diana pulled out of the competition.
2022	Astana	Aidana Akhantaeva	Айдана Ахантаева	Did not compete		Withdrew — Was replaced by a newer delegate.
Sovet Seitove directorship — a franchise holder to Miss Universe between 2019―2021
2021	Almaty	Aziza Tokashova	Азиза Тоқашова	Unplaced		
2020	Pavlodar	Kamilla Serikbay	Камилла Серікбай	Unplaced		
2019	Atyrau	Alfïya Ersayın	Альфия Ерсайын	Unplaced		
Sovet Seitove "Miss Almaty" directorship — a franchise holder to Miss Universe between 2015―2018
2018	Taldykorgan	Sabina Azimbayeva	Сабина Әзімбаева	Unplaced		
2017	Almaty	Kamilla Asylova	Камилла Асылова	Unplaced		
2016	Semey	Darina Kulsitova	Дарина Күлситова	Unplaced		
2015	Almaty	Regina Valter	Реджина Вальтер	Did not compete		Miss Almaty — Sovet Seitove (San Bell); Regina Valter withdrew in 2015 and was intended to compete at the Miss Universe 2016 pageant; However, after a new Competition was held that year a new titleholder was crowned Valter was quietly dismissed.
Sovet Seitove directorship — a franchise holder to Miss Universe between 2006―2014
2014	Almaty	Aiday Isaeva	Айдай Исаева	Unplaced		
2013	Almaty	Aygerim Kozhakanova	Айгерім Қожақанова	Unplaced		Appointed — Aygerim was the winner of Miss Almaty 2013.
2013	Kentau	Zhazira Nurimbetova	Жазира Нұрымбетова	Did not compete		
2012	Taldykorgan	Aynur Toleuova	Айнұр Төлеуова	Did not compete		Due to minimum age recruitment, Aynur Toleuova was barred not from competing.
2011	Almaty	Valeriya Aleinikova	Валерия Алейникова	Unplaced		Appointed — Valeriya was 1st Runner-up at Miss Kazakhstan 2010.
2010	Almaty	Asselina Kuchukova	Әселина Кучукова	Unplaced		
2010	Almaty	Symbat Madyarova	Симбиан Мадярова	Did not compete		Symbat Madyarova was replaced by Asselina Kuchukova (Miss Almaty) to be "Miss Universe Kazakhstan" but her title existed until her reign was over.
2009	Karaganda	Olga Nikitina	Ольга Никитина	Did not compete		Olga was scheduled to compete at Miss Universe 2009 but due to lack of sponsorship, she decided to withdraw from the competition.
2008	Almaty	Alfina Nasyrova	Альфина Насырова	Unplaced	Best Ao Dai (Top 5)	
2007	Almaty	Gaukhar Rakhmetaliyeva	Гаухар Рахметалиева	Unplaced		
2006	Shymkent	Dina Nuraliyeva	Дина Нұралиева	Unplaced		Miss Kazakhstan — Sovet Seitove (San Bell) directorship.

=== Miss World Kazakhstan ===
- : Declared the winner
- : Finished as a runner-up or top 5/6 qualification
- : Finished as one of the finalists or semi-finalists
- : Finished as a special awards winner

Year	Region	Miss Qazaqstan	Kazakh Name	Placement at Miss World	Special awards	Notes
Aiday Isaeva directorship — a franchise holder to Miss World from 2022
2026	Oskemen	Bagim Baltabaeva	Бағым Балтабаева	Unplaced		
2025	Astana	Sabina Idrissova	Сабина Идрисова	Unplaced		
Miss World 2023 was rescheduled to 2024 due to the change of host and when entering India as the new host, there were several issues that caused the postponement until March 2024.
2023	Astana	Tomiris Kakimova	Томирис Кәкімова	Unplaced		
Miss World 2021 was rescheduled to 16 March 2022 due to the COVID-19 pandemic outbreak in Puerto Rico, no edition started in 2022.
Sovet Seitove directorship — a franchise holder to Miss World between 1998―2021
2021	Aktobe	Nazerke Karmanova	Назерке Карманова	Did not compete		Nazerke married before competing at Miss World.
Due to the impact of COVID-19 pandemic, no competition held in 2020―2021
2019	Pavlodar	Madina Batyk	Мәдина Балық	Unplaced	Miss World Top Model (Top 10)	
2018	Karaganda	Yekaterina Dvorechkaya	Екатерина Дворечкая	Unplaced		Yekaterina was 1st Runner-up at Miss Kazakhstan 2018.
2017	Kyzylorda	Gulbanu Azimkhanova	Камилла Асылова	Top 40	Head-to-head challenge winner	
2016	Aktau	Alia Mergenbaeva	Әлиа Мергенбаева	Unplaced		
2015	Almaty	Regina Vandysheva	Регина Вандишева	Top 20	Miss World Sport (3rd Runner-up); People's Choice award (Top 25); Miss World Top Model (Top 30)	
2014	Almaty	Madina Davletova	Мадина Давлетова	Did not compete		Madina was 2nd Runner-up at Miss Kazakhstan 2013.
2013	Taldykorgan	Aynur Toleuova	Айнұр Төлеуова	Unplaced		
2012		Yevgeniya Klishina	Евгения Кlishина	Top 30		Yevgenia was 1st Runner-up at Miss Kazakhstan 2010.
2011	Oral	Zhanna Zhumaliyeva	Жанна Жұмалиева	Top 15	Miss World Top Model	
2010	Almaty	Asselina Kuchukova	Әселина Кучукова	Unplaced		
2009	Shymkent	Dina Nuraliyeva	Дина Нұралиева	Top 15		
2008	Almaty	Alfina Nasyrova	Альфина Насырова	Top 15		
2007	Nur-Sultan	Dana Kaparova	Дана Капарова	Unplaced		Dana was 1st Runner-up at Miss Kazakhstan 2006.
2006	Karaganda	Sabina Chukayeva	Сабина Чөкайова	Unplaced		Sabina was 1st Runner-up at Miss Kazakhstan 2005.
Did not compete in 2005
2004	Almaty	Alexandra Kazakova	Александра Казакова	Unplaced		
2003	Pavlodar	Saule Zhunusova	Саили Жүнісова	Unplaced		
2002	Almaty	Olga Sidorenko	Ольга Сидоренко	Unplaced		
Did not compete in 2001
2000	Rostov-on-Don	Margarita Kravtsova	Маргарита кравцова	Top 5	World Designer Dress award	
1999	Almaty	Asel Isabayeva	Әсел Исабаева	Unplaced		
1998	Almaty	Anna Kirpota	Анна Кирпота	Unplaced		Anna was 1st Runner-up at Miss Kazakhstan 1998.

=== Miss Grand Kazakhstan ===
- : Declared the winner
- : Finished as a runner-up
- : Finished as one of the finalists or semi-finalists
- : Finished as a special awards winner

Year	Region	Miss Qazaqstan	Kazakh Name	Placement at Miss Grand International	Special awards	Notes
2026	Almaty	Anel Emel	Анель Емел	TBA	TBA	
2025	Kyzylorda	Tomiris Kadyrkhan	Томирис Кадырхан	Unplaced	Grand Talent (Top 15)	Miss Earth Qazaqstan 2025.

== Past license holders ==
=== Miss Earth Kazakhstan ===
- : Declared the winner
- : Finished as a runner-up
- : Finished as one of the finalists or semi-finalists
- : Finished as a special awards winner

Year	Region	Miss Qazaqstan	Kazakh Name	Placement at Miss Earth	Special awards	Notes
Aiday Isaeva directorship — a franchise holder to Miss Earth from 2022−2024
2024	Almaty	Ayaulym Alimkhaliyeva	Аяулым Алимхалиева	Did not compete		
2023	Almaty	Dilnaz Tilaeva	Дильназ Тілаева	Top 8 (Runner-up)	Best in Evening Gown	
2022	Karaganda	Anna Glubokovskaya	Анна Глубоковская	Did not compete		Withdrew for undisclosed reasons.
Another agency directorship — a franchise holder to Miss Earth between 2007―2019
Due to the impact of COVID-19 pandemic, no representative between 2020—2021
2019	Almaty	Altynay Assenova	Алтынай Әсенова	Unplaced		
Did not compete between 2015—2018
2014	Nur-Sultan	Assel Zholdassova	Әсел Жолдасова	Unplaced	(bronze) Talent Competition (Group 3)	
2013	Almaty	Kumis Bazarbayeva	Күміс Базарбаева	Unplaced	Best in Talent; Miss Ever Bilena; Miss Versailles	
Did not compete between 2008—2012
2007	Almaty	Zhazira Nurkhodjaeva	Жазира Нұрходжаева	Unplaced		
Sovet Seitove directorship — a franchise holder to Miss Earth in 2001
Did not compete between 2002—2006
2001	Almaty	Margarita Kravtsova	Маргарита Кравцова	Miss Earth Water 2001 (2nd Runner-up)	Best in Swimsuit	
