= Kamilla Asylova =

Kazakhstani model

- Born: Kamilla Asylova; 14 September 1998 (age 28); Almaty, Kazakhstan
- Height: 1.78 m (5 ft 10 in)
- Beauty pageant titleholder
- Title: Miss Almaty 2016
- Hair color: Brown
- Eye color: Brown
- Major competitions: Miss Almaty 2016 (Winner); Miss Universe 2017 (Unplaced)

Kamilla Asylova (born 14 September 1998) is a Kazakhstani model and beauty pageant titleholder who was crowned Miss Universe Kazakhstan 2016 and represented Kazakhstan at Miss Universe 2017.

== Early and personal life ==
Kamilla was born and raised in Almaty, Kazakhstan.

== Pageantry ==
=== Miss Almaty 2016 ===
On October 9, 2016, Kamila won the title of Miss Almaty 2016, defeating 21 other contestants.

=== Miss Universe 2017 ===
She competed at Miss Universe 2017, held in Las Vegas, Nevada, United States, but was not placed.

Awards and achievements
Preceded by Darina Kulsitova	Miss Universe Kazakhstan; 2017	Succeeded by Sabina Azimbayeva
