= Regina Vandysheva =

Kazakh model (born 1992)

- Born: Regina Vandysheva; October 31, 1992 (age 33); Almaty, Kazakhstan
- Height: 1.77 m (5 ft 9 1/2 in)
- Beauty pageant titleholder
- Title: Miss Kazakhstan 2014
- Hair color: Brown
- Eye color: Blue
- Major competitions: Miss Kazakhstan 2014 (Winner); Miss World 2015 (Top 20)

Regina Vandysheva (born October 31, 1992) is a Kazakhstani model and beauty pageant titleholder who was crowned Miss Kazakhstan 2014 and represented her country at Miss World 2015 pageants.

== Pageantry ==
In 2014, Regina was crowned as Miss Almaty 2014. Together at the event the reigning Miss Kazakhstan 2013, Aiday Isaeva gave a crown to Regina. Later she competed at Miss Kazakhstan 2014 National contest.

=== Miss Kazakhstan 2014 ===
On 28 November 2014, Regina was crowned as Miss Kazakhstan 2014.

=== Miss World 2015 ===
Regina participated at Miss World 2015 pageant and placed Top 20.

Awards and achievements
Preceded by Aynur Toleuova	Miss World Kazakhstan; 2014	Succeeded by TBD
