= Lisa Punch =

Guyanese singer (born 1992)

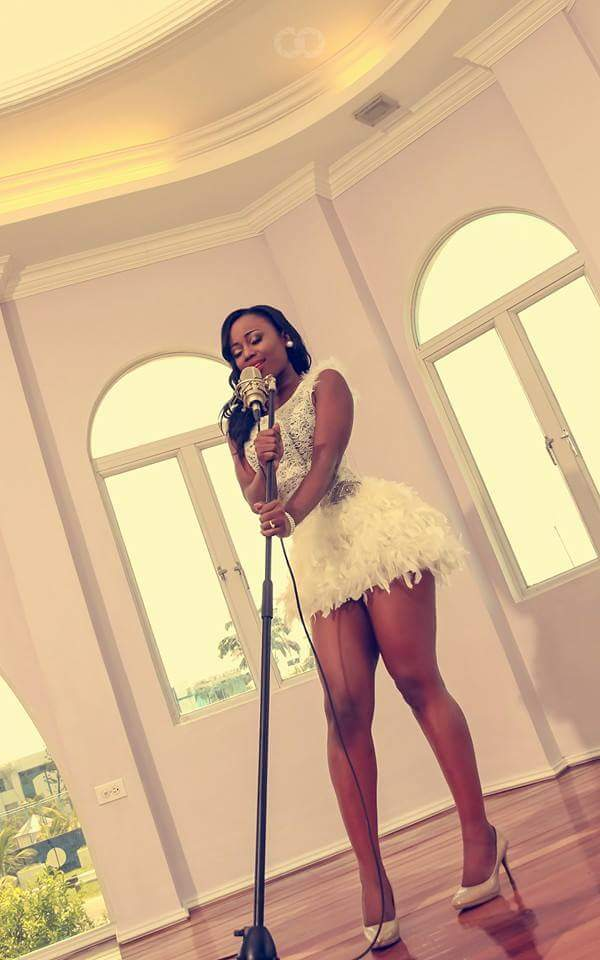
- Born: 4 September 1992 (age 34); Georgetown, Guyana
- Education: B.A in criminology and psychology
- Alma mater: University of Guyana
- Occupations: Singer; actress; TV host; beauty pageant titleholder
- Years active: 2009-present
- Known for: Rising Star ABC television show contestant; Miss Guyana 2015
- Spouse: Tyron Benn (m. 2018)
- Children: 2

Lisa Punch (born 4 September 1992) is a Guyanese singer and actress. She is known for being a contestant on the Rising Star ABC television show in 2014 and as the Miss Guyana in 2015. She is also the founder of the Prevention of Teenage Suicide-Guyana (POTS) organization.

== Early life and education ==
Punch was born on 4 September 1992 in Georgetown, Guyana. She spent six years of her childhood at the Eve Leary Police Compound, two years in Berbice, and then in Charlotte Street in Georgetown. She is the daughter of John Errol Punch and Nafieza Aiana Daniels and the eldest of five siblings. At the age of three, she attended the Juliet Griffith Day Care Center in the town. In 2008, she obtained her Caribbean Secondary Education Certificate (CSEC) from North Georgetown Secondary School. She went to Bishop's High School to study Communication and Law in 2010. In 2013, her family moved to the United States when she was 21. She has settled in Brooklyn, New York. Later, she graduated from the University of Guyana in Criminology and Psychology.

== Career ==
=== Music ===
Punch started singing at the age of 6. In 2003, she began participating in various television competition shows. At the age of 14, she competed in Guyana's first reality show, "Star Guyana" and she was selected as the winner after performing a rendition of Whitney Houston's I Will Always Love You. She was the voice for Guyana in the regional theme song "Carifesta" in 2007.

In 2009, she released her debut reggae single, "Secret Admirer". Soon it was followed by her other tracks like, "One Last Time", "My Inspiration", "How We Party", "Wickedee", "All I Need", "Wipe Those Tears", and "Stars Align". Her debut album "The Evolution of Lisa Punch" was released in 2013.

Punch rose to fame, both in Guyana and the U.S., when she appeared on the ABC television show Rising Star as a contestant in 2014, where she competed up to the week 7. She made headlines when she performed at the annual Barbados Music Awards 2014. The same year, she was invited to perform at the inaugural Guyana Festival by the government of Guyana. In June 2015, she was crowned as the Miss World Guyana. By the end of 2015, she participated in the Miss World competition held in Sanya, China. She won the Miss World Talent segment on 14 December 2015 by rendering her original song "One Last Time", which she wrote in the memory of her late cousin. She finally ended up eighth in the competition.

In 2018, Punch paid tribute to the Indian political ethicist Gandhi by singing his favorite bhajan. She was invited by the Indian High Commission on the occasion of Gandhi's 150th birth anniversary.

=== Acting ===
Apart from singing, Punch has also pursued a career in acting. When she was a high school student, she used to perform in the Children's Mashramani Competition, representing the Georgetown district in dramatic poetry and almost always winning first place. She is a member of the Theatre Guild, Guyana. She played a notable role in the short film "Hope" which was screened at the Guyana Film Festival.

=== Other ventures ===
Punch did modelling at an early age. From 2011 to 2013, she also worked as a radio announcer and producer at the National Communications Network, Guyana. She hosted and produced a show called "Young, Talented, and Wise".

== Personal life ==
Punch married Tyron Benn in 2018. The couple has two sons, Tayshaun and Leandre.

== Philanthropy ==
Punch founded the Prevention of Teenage Suicide-Guyana organization in 2014. The organization works to counter the threatening social problem of suicide in Guyana.

== Awards ==
She has received, so far:

- The Best Actress Award for the play "The Concert" in 2008.
- The Theatre Guild Award for Best Supporting Actress in 2011.
- The Drama Festival Award for Best Supporting Actress in 2011.
- The Drama Festival Award for Best Supporting Actress in 2012.
- The Guyana International Artistic Music Award 2016

== Albums and extended plays ==
| Title | Album details |
|---|---|
| The Evolution of Lisa Punch | Released: March 1, 2013; Label:Brutal Tracks Recording Studios; Written by herself |
| Girl on Fire | Released on August 3, 2014; Label: Capitol Records; Written by herself |
| Perfectly Imperfect | Released on April 22, 2017; Written by herself |
| Where Did You Go | Released on August 6, 2018; Label: Ken Da BeatMaker and Brutal Tracks Recording; Written by: Lisa Punch, Charles Beresford, and Emika Punch |
| Tears of Joy | Released on August 13, 2019; Co-singer: Tayshaun |
| Talk About It | Released on April 24, 2020; Written by herself |
