= Zhazira Nurimbetova =

Kazakh beauty pageant titleholder (born 1991)

- Born: Zhazira Nurimbetova; October 7, 1991 (age 35); Kentau, Kazakhstan
- Height: 1.74 m (5 ft 9 in)
- Beauty pageant titleholder
- Title: Miss Kazakhstan 2012
- Hair color: Black
- Eye color: Black
- Major competitions: Miss Kazakhstan 2012 (Winner)

Zhazira Nurimbetova (Kazakh: Жазира Нұрымбетова, romanized: Jazira Nūrymbetova; born 7 October 1991 in Kentau) is a Kazakh beauty pageant titleholder who was crowned Miss Kazakhstan 2012.

== Pageantry ==
=== Miss Kazakhstan 2012 ===
After becoming Miss Shymkent, Nurimbetova was crowned Miss Kazakhstan 2012 at the Palace of Independence in Astana on 8 December 2012. Aygerim Kozhakanova, winner of the Miss Almaty pageant, was crowned as Miss Universe Kazakhstan 2013 after Nurimbetova withdrew to compete at the Miss Universe 2013.

Awards and achievements
Preceded by Aynur Toleuova	Miss Kazakhstan; 2012	Succeeded by Aiday Isaeva
