= Alfina Nassyrova =

Kazakh model (born 1988)

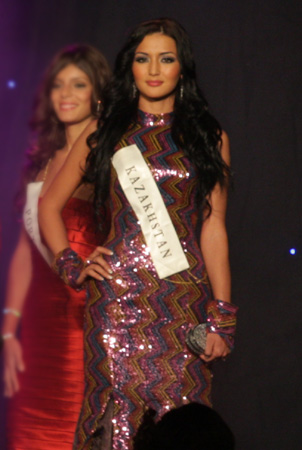
- Born: Alfina Nassyrova; 12 June 1988 (age 38); Alma-Ata, Kazakh SSR, Soviet Union
- Height: 1.74 m (5 ft 9 in)
- Beauty pageant titleholder
- Title: Miss Kazakhstan 2007
- Major competitions: Miss Kazakhstan 2007; (Winner); Miss Universe 2008; (Unplaced); Miss World 2008; (Top 15)

Alfina Nassyrova (Kazakh: Әлфина Робертқызы Насырова, Älfina Robertqyzy Nasyrova; Russian: Альфина Насырова; born 11 June 1988) is a Kazakh model and beauty pageant titleholder who won the national pageant Miss Kazakhstan in 2007 held at the Abai State Kazakh National Opera & Ballet Theatre in Almaty.

She went on to represent Kazakhstan in Miss Universe 2008 in Nha Trang, Vietnam, on 14 July 2008, and Miss World 2008 in Johannesburg, South Africa, on 13 December 2008. She was not placed in Miss Universe, but she was among the Top 15 in Miss World. She studied textile and manufacturing at the Almaty Technological University.

Preceded by Gaukhar Rakhmetaliyeva	Miss Kazakhstan; 2007	Succeeded by Olga Nikitina
Preceded by Gaukhar Rakhmetaliyeva	Miss Universe Kazakhstan; 2008	Succeeded by Assel Kuchukova
Preceded by Dana Kaparova	Miss World Kazakhstan; 2008	Succeeded by Dina Nuraliyeva
