= Lāsma Zemene =

Latvian police officer

Lāsma Zemene is a Latvian police officer and beauty pageant titleholder who was crowned Mis Latvija 2015 and represented her nation at the Miss World 2015 competition.

In a 2017 interview, she said that she continues to work as a public relations specialist with the Riga Municipal Police, including disseminating information to the media.
