= Rising Star (American TV series) =

2014 American reality television series

- Developed by: Screenz Cross Media LTD
- Presented by: Josh Groban
- Judges: Kesha; Brad Paisley; Ludacris
- Theme music composer: Eran Prion
- Country of origin: United States
- No. of seasons: 1
- No. of episodes: 10

Production
- Executive producers: Ken Warwick; Nicolle Yaron
- Running time: 60–120 minutes (with commercials)
- Production company: Keshet DCP

Original release
- Network: ABC (U.S.); CTV (Canada)
- Release: June 22 – August 24, 2014

Rising Star is an American reality television singing competition which began airing on ABC on June 22, 2014. It was based on the international franchise series Rising Star itself based on the Israeli singing competition HaKokhav HaBa (meaning "The Next Star") made by Keshet Broadcasting Ltd. The program format lets viewers vote for contestants via mobile apps. It was filmed live in Los Angeles. The show was also carried in Canada, with advertising simultaneous substitution and voting access on CTV.

Jesse Kinch was the winner of Rising Star's only season with a vote of 76%. Macy Kate held the record of the highest score with 93%; she would eventually finish in ninth place. Daniel & Olivia held the record of the lowest score with 6%, and eventually finished in last place (both Macy Kate and Daniel & Olivia were in the first episode). Rising Star aired its final episode on August 24, 2014, and was cancelled shortly afterwards due to low ratings.

== Format ==
The app used to collect votes from the viewers. The blue or red arrows would be swiped to indicate a "yes" or "no" vote for each performance.

In contrast to other singing competition TV shows which feature a cast of celebrity judges, Rising Star featured a cast of celebrity experts and considers the viewers at home the judges. During each performance, the audience at home was able to decide in real time whether or not a contestant was sent through to the next round by using a mobile voting app.

While the viewers at home were considered the "judges", the expert panelists (Brad Paisley, Kesha, and Ludacris) also influence the vote. For the first six shows, a yes vote from one of the judges added 7% to the performer's total; this total was reduced by 2% for every show afterwards until the final episode, where it counts as a home audience vote.

=== Auditions ===
Each performance began with the contestant singing behind a screen ("The Wall"). Once the contestant reached 70% of "Yes" votes on either the east or west coast, the wall was raised and the contestant advanced to the next round of the competition. Alongside the viewers' vote, three of the panelists (excluding the host) had 7% of the vote each, which would be added should they vote "Yes".

=== Duels ===
Contestants who made it through the auditions were paired by the judges to face off in a duel (in the event of an odd number of contestants making it through, the contestant who had the highest number of votes across all time zones but did not make it through the auditions was given a slot in the duels). The first contestant to sing, chosen by a coin toss before the show, sang with the wall up and set the benchmark for the second contestant. The second contestant sang with the wall down. If the second contestant surpassed the first contestant's vote total, the wall rose and the second contestant advanced to the next round while the first contestant was eliminated; if the second contestant failed to raise the wall, the second contestant was eliminated and the first contestant was sent through. Also, the losing contestant with the highest number of West Coast votes in each episode was given a save and advanced to the next round.

=== Top 13 ===
After the duel rounds end, 13 of the contestants that survived perform. The first 7 contestants performed with the wall up, after which the contestant with the lowest vote total was placed in the hot seat. The subsequent contestants performed with the wall down, and they had to beat the vote total of the contestant in the hot seat to raise the wall. If they succeeded in doing so, the contestant in the hot seat was eliminated, the contestant with the next lowest vote total was placed in the hot seat, and the performing contestant was provisionally qualified; otherwise, the performing contestant was eliminated if they failed to raise the wall. This continues until the six contestants with the lowest number of votes were eliminated. In addition, the eliminated contestant with the highest number of West Coast votes in each episode was given a save and was through to the next round. In this stage, each panelist's vote added 5% to the total.

=== Quarterfinals & Semifinals ===
The quarterfinals and semifinals followed the same format as the top 13, except with a few changes to the weightage of the panelists' votes and number of contestants. In the quarterfinals, eight contestants battle for six spots (including the West Coast save), and each panelist's vote counts as 3%. In the semifinals, six contestants battle for four spots (including the West Coast save), and each panelist's vote added 1% to the total.

=== Finale ===
During the finale, the four remaining contestants were paired into two preliminary duels. The first contestant sang with the wall up and set the target for the second contestant. The second contestant sang with the wall down. If the second contestant beat the target percentage, the wall rose and the contestant moved on to the final duel. However, if the second contestant's percentage was lower than the first contestant's, the wall stayed down and the contestant was eliminated. In the final duel, the two contestants that moved on faced off against each other with their second song. The same process applied for this round, except that the running vote total was not revealed and both contestants sang with the wall up. The contestant with the higher vote percentage was declared the winner of the competition; in the event of a tie, the winner would be determined by whoever had the highest number of votes during the first duel of the finale. The experts' yes vote counted as a home vote as they vote with their phones; their choices were not revealed to both the performers and the audience. People residing in the West Coast were not eligible to vote during the finale.

=== Time zones ===
Due to the effects of time zones on North American broadcasting, the show aired at 9 p.m. Eastern, 8 p.m. Central, and 7 p.m. Mountain Time Zones. To accommodate the Mountain Time Zone (which usually does not carry any live programming with the Eastern and Central time zones and airs it on an hour delay), ABC rotated the usual 7 p.m. MT program, Wipeout to air at 8 p.m. MT instead out of Rising Star. Additionally, the network's affiliates in the Caribbean Sea region, including Aguadilla, Puerto Rico's WPRU-LP and WSVI in the United States Virgin Islands (which have since disaffiliated from the network) broadcast the series live, despite being an hour ahead in the Atlantic Time Zone (as they both take ABC's Eastern feed an hour ahead except during daylight saving in which Eastern Time is at the same time as in the Atlantic Time Zone for these regions due to not observing daylight saving time.).

In the state of Arizona (except for the Navajo Nation), which does not observe Daylight Saving Time, the program aired live at 6 p.m. local time. For Pacific and Alaskan time zone viewers, a dedicated feed was provided to show real-time voting particular to these viewers and a comparison to how the earlier time zones voted. In an instance where a contestant who didn't pass based on viewers from the Eastern, Central, and Mountain Time Zones, yet ends up faring better with the Pacific and Alaskan time zones, the contestant would pass. In addition, a "West Coast save" was given to the losing contestant with the highest number of West Coast votes in the post-audition rounds, except for the finale.

As Alaska is one hour before the Pacific Time Zone, and programming normally airs similar to Central and Mountain time, Alaskans was able to participate live as well. However, residents of Hawaii were unable to participate since Hawaii time is two hours behind Pacific Time (or three when daylight saving time is observed in Pacific Time). Likewise, viewers in the other western insular islands such as American Samoa, Guam and Northern Mariana Islands had no means to participate whatsoever, as network programming on the affiliates of those islands is usually delayed by a day as it would be early morning if it did air live.

During West Coast broadcasts, live cut-ins to show reactions of contestants who passed only with West Coast viewers were displayed. There was no revocation of "pass" status if West Coast viewers rejected a contestant during the initial audition rounds. ABC stated that the chances of the West Coast differing substantially from other viewers was statistically small; however, in weeks 8 and 9 of the competition, West Coast votes differed enough from East Coast votes that contestants Maneepat Myra Molloy and Audrey Kate Geiger were saved over other contestants who had higher totals on the East Coast.

For CTV viewers in Canada, broadcasts originally followed the ABC model through all time zones, but switched partway through the season so all CTV stations across Canada aired the show live with the Eastern feed.

== Results ==
Color key

- Artist advanced to the next round
- Artist was initially eliminated, but received enough votes from viewers in the Pacific and Alaska time zones to advance
- Artist was initially eliminated, but was selected as a wildcard due to having the highest combined voting percentage across all time zones
- Artist was eliminated
- Voting percentage in Eastern/Central/Mountain time zones
- Voting percentage in Pacific/Alaska time zones

=== Auditions ===
==== Week 1 (aired June 22, 2014) ====
Order	Artist	Age	Hometown	Song	Percentage		Experts' choices			Result
Order	Artist	Age	Hometown	Song	Eastern/Central	Pacific	Brad Paisley	Kesha	Ludacris	Result
1	Joshua Peavy	28	Soperton, Georgia	"(Everything I Do) I Do It for You"	87%	83%	✔	✔	✔	Advanced
2	Lisa Punch	21	Brooklyn, New York	"How Will I Know"	80%	78%	✔	✔	✔	Advanced
3	Maneepat Molloy	16	Los Angeles, California	"Time to Say Goodbye"	73%	75%	✔	✔	✗	Advanced
4	Daniel & Olivia	24- 25	San Gabriel Valley, California	"Counting Stars"	6%	17%	✗	✗	✗	Eliminated
5	Jesse Kinch	20	Seaford, New York	"I Put a Spell on You"	92%	92%	✔	✔	✔	Advanced
6	Beyond 5	16-19	Nashville, Tennessee	"Wake Me Up"	46%	44%	✔	✔	✗	Eliminated
7	Sarah Darling	31	Nashville, Tennessee	"Merry Go 'Round"	89%	86%	✔	✔	✔	Advanced
8	Colin Huntley	16	Houston, Texas	"Sing"	38%	40%	✗	✗	✗	Eliminated
9	Summer Collins	18	Fayetteville, North Carolina	"Classic"	40%	37%	✗	✔	✗	Eliminated
10	Macy Kate	16	St. Petersburg, Florida	"Me and My Broken Heart"	93%	91%	✔	✔	✔	Advanced

==== Week 2 (aired June 29, 2014) ====
Order	Artist	Age	Hometown	Song	Percentage		Experts' choices			Result
Order	Artist	Age	Hometown	Song	Eastern/Central	Pacific	Brad Paisley	Kesha	Ludacris	Result
1	Shameia Crawford	30	Atlanta, Georgia	"We Are Young"	69%	71%	✔	✔	✔	Saved
2	April Lockhart	18	Warren, New Jersey	"Say You'll Be There"	85%	85%	✔	✔	✔	Advanced
3	Austin French	20	Tifton, Georgia	"Georgia on My Mind"	87%	85%	✔	✔	✔	Advanced
4	Trinitii	19-30	Sacramento, California	"Problem"	30%	35%	✗	✔	✗	Eliminated
5	Alice Lee	25	Chicago, Illinois	"You and I"	73%	74%	✗	✔	✔	Advanced
6	Rye Davis	25	Pig, Kentucky	"When You Say Nothing at All"	46%	43%	✗	✗	✗	Eliminated
7	Sonnet Simmons	33	Los Angeles, California	"Wicked Game"	81%	80%	✔	✔	✔	Advanced
8	Deedra Ervin	20	Belle Haven, Virginia	"Anything Could Happen"	26%	29%	✗	✗	✗	Eliminated
9	Will Roth	24	Watauga, Texas	"Sweater Weather"	83%	82%	✔	✔	✔	Advanced
10	Egypt Dixon	18	Texarkana, Texas	"Fancy"	44%	45%	✗	✔	✗	Eliminated
11	Adam Jaymes	23	Palmdale, California	"I Won't Give Up"	87%	88%	✔	✔	✔	Advanced
12	Megan Tibbits	26	Caro, Michigan	"All of Me"	68%	70%	✔	✔	✗	Saved

==== Week 3 (aired July 6, 2014) ====
Order	Artist	Age	Hometown	Song	Percentage		Experts' choices			Result
Order	Artist	Age	Hometown	Song	Eastern/Central	Pacific	Brad Paisley	Kesha	Ludacris	Result
1	Dana Williams	25	Los Angeles, California	"Stay"	87%	84%	✔	✔	✔	Advanced
2	Unselfish	23-25	Atlanta, Georgia	"Some Nights"	46%	48%	✗	✔	✗	Wildcard
3	Cliff Cody	39	Somerset, Ohio	"I'm Gonna Be Somebody"	49%	44%	✔	✗	✗	Eliminated
4	Audrey Kate Geiger	24	New York City, New York	"Stay with Me"	84%	84%	✔	✔	✔	Advanced
5	OhMG	20 & 25	Los Angeles, California	"Lights"	33%	35%	✗	✔	✗	Eliminated
6	Gabrielle Nicole	20	Cleveland, Ohio	"My Man"	90%	89%	✔	✔	✔	Advanced
7	Karen Hornsby	36	Jacksonville, Florida	"To Love You More"	82%	79%	✔	✔	✔	Advanced
8	TX3	23	Chester, Illinois	"Keep Your Head Up"	22%	25%	✗	✔	✗	Eliminated
9	Skye Griffin	26	Houston, Texas	"Only Girl (in the World)"	28%	29%	✗	✔	✗	Eliminated
10	Morgan Higgins	17	San Clemente, California	"Alone"	79%	77%	✗	✔	✔	Advanced

=== The Duels (July 13–27, 2014) ===
Week	Order	Artist	Song	Percentage		Experts' choices			Result
Week	Order	Artist	Song	Eastern/Central	Pacific	Brad Paisley	Kesha	Ludacris	Result
4	1	Alice Lee	"Wings"	69%	68%	✔	✔	✔	Advanced
4	1	Lisa Punch	"Perfect"	66%	67.43%	✗	✔	✗	Saved
4	2	Megan Tibbits	"Summertime"	71%	69%	✔	✔	✔	Advanced
4	2	Sarah Darling	"I Hope You Dance"	69%	67.34%	✔	✗	✗	Eliminated
4	3	Will Roth	"Wrecking Ball"	57%	56%	✔	✔	✗	Eliminated
4	3	Jesse Kinch	"Whipping Post"	90%	89%	✔	✔	✔	Advanced
5
5	1	Gabrielle Nicole	"River Deep – Mountain High"	49%	51%	✔	✔	✔	Eliminated
5	1	Macy Kate	"Demons"	80%	80%	✗	✔	✔	Advanced
5	2	Sonnet Simmons	"Feeling Good"	73%	73%	✔	✔	✔	Saved
5	2	April Lockhart	"Animal"	76%	76%	✔	✔	✔	Advanced
5	3	Austin French	"I Don't Want To Be"	81%	79%	✔	✔	✔	Advanced
5	3	Adam Jaymes	"Free Fallin'"	53%	56%	✔	✔	✗	Eliminated
6
6	1	Morgan Higgins	"The Edge of Glory"	45%	45%	✔	✔	✗	Eliminated
6	1	Maneepat Molloy	"Gravity"	66%	66%	✗	✔	✔	Advanced
6	2	Shameia Crawford	"Cry Me a River"	70%	73%	✔	✔	✔	Advanced
6	2	Unselfish	"Payphone"	33%	30%	✗	✔	✗	Eliminated
6	3	Dana Williams	"Will You Still Love Me Tomorrow"	67%	69%	✗	✔	✔	Saved
6	3	Audrey Kate Geiger	"Make You Feel My Love"	88%	86%	✔	✔	✔	Advanced
6	4	Karen Hornsby	"(You Make Me Feel Like) A Natural Woman"	67%	66%	✔	✔	✔	Eliminated
6	4	Joshua Peavy	"Too Close"	75%	74%	✔	✗	✔	Advanced

=== Top 13 (August 3, 2014) ===
During this round, an expert's vote added 5% to the total percentage; the eight contestants with the highest voting percentages (including the West Coast save) advanced to the next round, while the other five were eliminated.

Order	Artist	Song	Percentage		Experts' choices			Result
Order	Artist	Song	Eastern/Central	Pacific	Paisley	Kesha	Ludacris	Result
1	Macy Kate	"Who Knew"	60%	61%	✔	✔	✔	Eliminated
2	Shameia Crawford	"Next to Me"	76%	76%	✔	✔	✔	Advanced
3	Joshua Peavy	"How Am I Supposed to Live Without You"	85%	83%	✔	✔	✔	Advanced
4	April Lockhart	"Iris"	71%	73%	✔	✔	✔	Advanced
5	Maneepat Molloy	"Stars"	69%	70%	✔	✔	✗	Advanced
6	Dana Williams	"Latch"	60%	65%	✔	✔	✔	Saved
7	Alice Lee	"The Story"	40%	42%	✗	✔	✗	Eliminated
8	Jesse Kinch	"Seven Nation Army"	88%	87%	✔	✔	✔	Advanced
9	Megan Tibbits	"Home"	32%	31%	✔	✔	✗	Eliminated
10	Lisa Punch	"Girl on Fire"	59%	63%	✔	✔	✔	Eliminated
11	Audrey Kate Geiger	"The Big Bang"	65%	62%	✔	✔	✔	Advanced
12	Austin French	"If I Ain't Got You"	86%	83%	✔	✔	✔	Advanced
13	Sonnet Simmons	"Young and Beautiful"	30%	30%	✗	✗	✗	Eliminated

=== Week 8: Quarterfinals (August 10, 2014) ===
In this round, the experts' votes added 3% to the total vote percentage; the six contestants with the highest voting percentages (including the West Coast save) advanced to the semifinals, while the other two were eliminated.

Order	Artist	Song	Percentage		Experts' choices			Result
Order	Artist	Song	Eastern/Central	Pacific	Paisley	Kesha	Ludacris	Result
1	Joshua Peavy	"American Woman"	71%	67%	✔	✔	✔	Advanced
2	Dana Williams	"Human"	57%	60%	✔	✔	✗	Advanced
3	April Lockhart	"Girls Just Want To Have Fun"	27%	30%	✗	✔	✗	Eliminated
4	Maneepat Molloy	"Your Song"	46%	55%	✗	✔	✗	Saved
5	Audrey Kate Geiger	"New York State of Mind"	85%	85%	✔	✔	✔	Advanced
6	Austin French	"The House Of The Rising Sun"	89%	86%	✔	✔	✔	Advanced
7	Shameia Crawford	"Skyscraper"	54%	54%	✔	✔	✔	Eliminated
8	Jesse Kinch	"Money (That's What I Want)"	88%	88%	✗	✔	✔	Advanced

=== Week 9: Semifinals (August 17, 2014) ===
In this round, the experts' votes added 1% to the total vote percentage; the four contestants with the highest voting percentages (including the West Coast save) advanced to the final. This was the last round where people living in the Pacific and Alaskan time zones were eligible to vote.

Order	Artist	Song	Percentage		Experts' choices			Result
Order	Artist	Song	Eastern/Central	Pacific	Paisley	Kesha	Ludacris	Result
1	Austin French	"Love Runs Out"	81%	78%	✔	✔	✔	Finalist
2	Maneepat Molloy	"Chandelier"	27%	34%	✔	✔	✗	Eliminated
3	Jesse Kinch	"Billie Jean"	83%	83%	✔	✔	✔	Finalist
4	Dana Williams	"Sunday Morning"	75%	75%	✔	✔	✔	Finalist
5	Audrey Kate Geiger	"Killing Me Softly with His Song"	69%	68%	✔	✔	✔	Finalist
6	Joshua Peavy	"What Hurts the Most"	72%	67%	✔	✔	✗	Eliminated

=== Week 10: Finals (August 24, 2014) ===
During the finale, the experts voted on their phones, making theirs count as equal to a home judge's vote, as well as keeping their votes secret from the performers and the audience. People residing in the Pacific and Alaskan time zones were not eligible to vote in the finale, and as a result, voting was only open to those residing in the Eastern, Central, and Mountain time zones.

Order	Artist	Song	Percentage (Eastern/Central)	Result
1	Dana Williams	"At Last"	30%	4th place
1	Jesse Kinch	"Fortunate Son"	87%	Grand Final
2	Austin French	"In Love with a Girl"	70%	Grand Final
2	Audrey Kate Geiger	"Love Me Like a Man"	49%	3rd place
3	Jesse Kinch	"Love, Reign o'er Me"	76%	Winner
3	Austin French	"Bless the Broken Road"	61%	Runner-up

=== Elimination table ===
Artist	Week 1	Week 2	Week 3	Week 4	Week 5	Week 6	Week 7	Week 8	Week 9	Week 10	
Jesse Kinch	92% / 92%	—N/a	—N/a	90% / 89%	—N/a	—N/a	88% / 87%	88% / 88%	83% / 83%	87%	76%
Austin French	—N/a	87% / 85%	—N/a	—N/a	81% / 79%	—N/a	86% / 83%	89% / 86%	81% / 78%	70%	61%
Audrey Kate Geiger	—N/a	—N/a	84% / 84%	—N/a	—N/a	88% / 86%	65% / 62%	85% / 85%	69% / 68%	49%	Eliminated (Week 10)
Dana Williams	—N/a	—N/a	87% / 84%	—N/a	—N/a	67% / 69%	60% / 65%	57% / 60%	75% / 75%	30%	Eliminated (Week 10)
Joshua Peavy	87% / 83%	—N/a	—N/a	—N/a	—N/a	75% / 74%	85% / 83%	71% / 67%	72% / 67%	Eliminated (Week 9)	
Maneepat Molloy	73% / 75%	—N/a	—N/a	—N/a	—N/a	66% / 66%	69% / 70%	46% / 55%	27% / 34%	Eliminated (Week 9)	
Shameia Crawford	—N/a	69% / 71%	—N/a	—N/a	—N/a	70% / 73%	76% / 76%	54% / 54%	Eliminated (Week 8)		
April Lockhart	—N/a	85% / 85%	—N/a	—N/a	76% / 76%	—N/a	71% / 73%	27% / 30%	Eliminated (Week 8)		
Macy Kate	93% / 91%	—N/a	—N/a	—N/a	80% / 80%	—N/a	60% / 61%	Eliminated (Week 7)			
Lisa Punch	80% / 78%	—N/a	—N/a	66% / 67%	—N/a	—N/a	59% / 63%	Eliminated (Week 7)			
Alice Lee	—N/a	73% / 74%	—N/a	69% / 68%	—N/a	—N/a	40% / 42%	Eliminated (Week 7)			
Megan Tibbits	—N/a	68% / 70%	—N/a	71% / 69%	—N/a	—N/a	32% / 31%	Eliminated (Week 7)			
Sonnet Simmons	—N/a	81% / 80%	—N/a	—N/a	73% / 73%	—N/a	30% / 30%	Eliminated (Week 7)			
Karen Hornsby	—N/a	—N/a	82% / 79%	—N/a	—N/a	67% / 66%	Eliminated (Week 6)				
Morgan Higgins	—N/a	—N/a	79% / 77%	—N/a	—N/a	45% / 45%	Eliminated (Week 6)				
Unselfish	—N/a	—N/a	46% / 48%	—N/a	—N/a	33% / 30%	Eliminated (Week 6)				
Adam Jaymes	—N/a	87% / 88%	—N/a	—N/a	53% / 56%	Eliminated (Week 5)					
Gabrielle Nicole	—N/a	—N/a	90% / 89%	—N/a	49% / 51%	Eliminated (Week 5)					
Sarah Darling	89% / 86%	—N/a	—N/a	69% / 67%	Eliminated (Week 4)						
Will Roth	—N/a	83% / 82%	—N/a	56% / 57%	Eliminated (Week 4)						
Cliff Cody	—N/a	—N/a	49% / 44%	Eliminated (Week 3)							
OhMG	—N/a	—N/a	33% / 35%	Eliminated (Week 3)							
Skye Griffin	—N/a	—N/a	28% / 29%	Eliminated (Week 3)							
TX3	—N/a	—N/a	22% / 25%	Eliminated (Week 3)							
Rye Davis	—N/a	46% / 43%	Eliminated (Week 2)								
Egypt Dixon	—N/a	44% / 45%	Eliminated (Week 2)								
Trinitii	—N/a	30% / 35%	Eliminated (Week 2)								
Deedra Ervin	—N/a	26% / 29%	Eliminated (Week 2)								
Beyond 5	46% / 44%	Eliminated (Week 1)									
Summer Collins	40% / 37%	Eliminated (Week 1)									
Colin Huntley	38% / 40%	Eliminated (Week 1)									
Daniel & Olivia	6% / 17%	Eliminated (Week 1)									

Note: Voting percentages are listed in order of those in the Eastern/Central/Mountain time zones, followed by those in the Pacific/Alaska time zones (except for the final week).
Blue numbers indicate the highest voting percentage for each week.
Red numbers indicate the lowest voting percentage for each week.
The performer was eliminated that week.
The performer was initially eliminated but was later saved by having the highest voting percentage in the Pacific/Alaska time zones.
The performer was initially eliminated but was saved by having the highest combined voting percentages across all time zones (due to an odd number of performers qualifying).
The performer won Rising Star.
The performer was the runner-up.
The performer placed third in the Finals.
The performer placed fourth in the Finals.

== Contestants who appeared on other shows ==
- Maneepat Molloy was the winner of the first season of Thailand's Got Talent
- Joshua Peavy later appeared on the 2017 revival of Showtime at the Apollo, receiving a positive response from the audience.

== Ratings ==
=== U.S. Nielsen ratings ===
Show	Episode	Original air date	Rating (18–49)	Share (18–49)	Viewers (millions)	Rank (Night)	18-49 Rank (Week)	Viewers Rank (Week)
1	Auditions Episode 1	June 22, 2014	1.5	5	5.20	2	9	21
2	Auditions Episode 2	June 29, 2014	1.2	4	4.85	2	19	
3	Auditions Episode 3	July 6, 2014	1.2	4	4.32			
4	Duels Episode 1	July 13, 2014	1.4	4	4.80			
5	Duels Episode 2	July 20, 2014	1.0	3	4.06			
6	Duels Episode 3	July 27, 2014	0.9	3	3.76			
7	The Round of Thirteen	August 3, 2014	0.9	3	3.73			
8	Quarterfinals	August 10, 2014	0.7	3	3.17			
9	Semifinals	August 17, 2014	0.8	2	3.22			
10	Finals	August 24, 2014	1.0	3	3.57			

Season Averages: 1.1 demo and 4.08 million viewers
