= Mis Latvija =

Beauty contest

Miss Latvia
- Miss and Mr. Latvia, LLC
- Mis Latvija
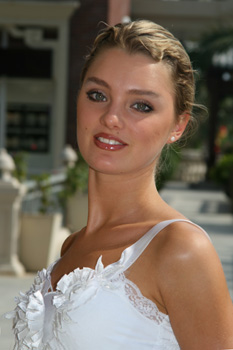
- Miss Latvija 2005
- Formation: 1989
- Type: Beauty pageant
- Headquarters: Riga
- Location: Latvia
- Members: Miss World; Miss International; Miss Earth
- Official language: Latvian
- CEO: Jūlija Djadenko-Müggler; Kristīne Djadenko

Miss Latvia (Latvian: Mis Latvija, Miss and Mr. Latvia, LLC) is a national beauty pageant in Latvia.

== History ==
The pageant is organized by Agency Miss and Mr Latvia (Latvian: aģentūra "Miss un Mr Latvia") which is led by Swiss-Latvian model and World Miss University 2004 Jūlija Djadenko-Müggler and Miss Latvia 2005 Kristīne Djadenko. Until 2015 the agency Mis Latvija was the only official organization entitled to organize the national beauty contests Miss and Mister Latvia, which it did since 1990.

The owner and founder Mis Latvija was Inta Fogele (1957–2016), who had organized the Latvian beauty pageants since 1988, when the inaugural Miss Riga competition took place. In 2015, she agreed to transfer the right to the Miss Latvia brand over to Miss and Mr Latvia LLC. The government of Latvia partially supported the agency at some point by financing the licenses to Miss and Mister World contests as a way of promoting the image of the country in the world.

== Titleholders ==
Year	Mis Latvija
1989	Ina Magone
1990	Velga Bražņevica
1991	Inese Šlesere
1992	Zane Vaļicka
1993	Sigita Rude
1994	Daina Tobija
1995	Ieva Meliņa
1996	Anta Dukure
1997	Līga Graudumniece
1998	Evija Ručevska
1999	Dina Kalandārova
2000	Gunta Rudzīte
2001	Baiba Švarca
2002	Zanda Zariņa
2003	Agnese Eiduka
2004	Agnese Krustiņa
2005	Kristīne Djadenko
2006	Ina Avlasēviča
2007	Viktorija Drizļonoka
2008	Ieva Lase
2009	Ludmila Voroncova
2010	Alise Miškovska
2011	Eva Dombrovska
2012/2013	Liliana Garkalne
2014	Lāsma Zemene
2015	not held
2016	Linda Kinca
2017	not held due to financial issues
2018	Sigita Cīrule
2019	Lita Blūma
2020/2021	Līga Jenča‑Salcēviča
2023	Anastasija Ivancova

== Big Four pageants ==
=== Representatives to Miss World ===
Color key

- Declared as Winner
- Ended as runner-up
- Ended as one of the finalists or semifinalists

Year	Miss Latvia	Placement at Miss World
1989	Ina Magone	Unplaced
1990	Velga Bražņevica	Unplaced
1991	Inese Šlesere	Unplaced
1992	Zane Vaļicka	Unplaced
1993	Sigita Rude	Unplaced
1994	Daina Tobija	Unplaced
1995	Ieva Meliņa	Unplaced
1996	Anta Dukure	Unplaced
1997	Līga Graudumniece	Unplaced
1998	none (Note: Evija Ručevska withdrew)	N/A
1999	Evija Ručevska	Unplaced
2000	none	N/A
2001	Dina Kalandārova	Unplaced
2002	Baiba Švarca	Unplaced
2003	Irina Askoļska	Unplaced
2004	Agnese Eiduka	Unplaced
2005	Valērija Ševčuka	Unplaced
2006	Līga Meinarte	Miss World Sport (2nd Runner-Up)
2007	Kristīne Djadenko	Unplaced
2008	Ina Avlasēviča	Unplaced
2009	Ieva Lase	Unplaced
2010	Ludmila Voroncova	Unplaced
2011	Alise Miškovska	Unplaced
2012	Anastasija Skibunova	Unplaced
2013	Eva Dombrovska	Unplaced
2014	Liliana Garkalne	Unplaced
2015	Lāsma Zemene	Unplaced
2016	Linda Kinca	Miss World Talent (Top 21); Miss World Sport (Top 24)
2017	Karolīna Matrosova	Did not compete
2018	Daniela Gods-Romanovska	Miss World Sport (Top 24)
2019	Internal contest not held	
2020	Contest not held	
2021	did not participate	
2023	Anastasija Ivancova	Did not compete
2025	Maria Mišurova	Unplaced
2026	Milana Smolara	Unplaced

=== Representatives to Miss Earth ===
Year	Miss Latvia	Placement at Miss Earth
2001	Jeļena Keirāne	Top 10
2002–2004	did not participate	
2005	Nora Reinholde	Unplaced
2006	did not participate	
2007	Ilze Jankovska	Unplaced
2008	Anita Baltrūna	Unplaced
2009	Diāna Kubasova	Unplaced
2010	Eva Caune	Unplaced
2011	Sanda Mežecka	Unplaced
2012–2013	did not participate	
2014	Alise Feldmane	Unplaced
2015	Malvīne Stučka	Did not compete
2016–2017	did not participate	
2018	Laura Škutāne	Did not compete
2019–2020	did not participate	
2021	Liene Leitāne	Unplaced

=== Representatives to Miss International ===
Year	Miss Latvia	Placement at Miss International
1998	Līga Graudumniece	Unplaced
1999	Agnese Keiša	Unplaced
2001	Laura Vīksna	Unplaced
2004	Jeļena Keirāne	Top 10
2007	Laura Fogele	Unplaced
2008	Kristīne Djadenko	Unplaced
2009	Anda Pudule	Unplaced
2010	Annija Alvatere	Unplaced
2011	Lelde Paulsone	Top 15 & Miss Panda
2012	Kristīne Viļuma	Unplaced
2013	Svetlana Goldberga	Withdrew before the contest

=== Representatives to Miss Global Beauty Queen ===
Year	Miss Latvia	Placement at Miss Global Beauty Queen
2016	Jūlija Ločmele	Top 15 + medal Peace Korea
2017	Karolīna Matrosova	Top 15 + medal Peace Korea

== See also ==
- Miss Universe Latvia
