= Jesse Kinch =

American singer

- Born: April 20, 1994 (age 32); Seaford, New York, U.S.
- Genres: Rock; blues rock; hard rock
- Occupations: Singer; guitarist; songwriter
- Instruments: Vocals; guitar
- Website: www.jessekinch.com

Jesse Kinch (born April 20, 1994) is an American singer, songwriter, and guitarist. He was the first and only winner of the reality singing competition show Rising Star.

== Life and career ==
=== Beginnings ===
Kinch, a Seaford, Long Island native picked up a guitar when he was 6, after discovering an old, beat up acoustic in his parents basement. They began to notice a mature sense of rhythm and pitch, convincing them to buy Jesse his first electric and soon introduced him to the great rock 'n' roll bands of the 1960s, 70s and the 90s grunge scene which he quickly embraced. These influences became an essential part of his musical foundation and sound. In some of Jesse's interviews, he recalls that even before he picked up a guitar and embraced the sound of classic rock, he was heavily exposed to operatic pop singers such as Sarah Brightman and Andrea Bocelli. He considers the pure sound and beauty of those singers a major influence on him to this day. At age 7, he began performing in clubs on Long Island and attracted attention from a local news paper that called him "The Boy Wonder" in reaction to his precocious musical ability. At age 8 he was featured as a news item on TV News Channel 12, Long Island where he played a medley of classic rock 'n' roll songs. Jesse continued to play guitar at local clubs through age 9 and at 10, he was invited to the Sam Ash Guitar Competition where he finished third amongst seasoned pros.

At age 11, Jesse found his voice and began to sing. He soon started performing around New York City where people would take notice to his strong and conviction filled rock 'n' roll voice. Throughout ages 12 and 13, he also became interested in writing his own songs which regularly became part of his set during shows.

In 2009, Jesse was chosen to portray the lead role of a young Eddie Money in the musical Two Tickets to Paradise after Money took notice to his energetic rock 'n' roll performance as his opening act in June 2008. Money originally mistook Jesse for being in his early 20s at the time but soon realized he was only 14. Although Money wanted an adult to portray his life in the musical, he felt Jesse was the only one that captured the look, sound and spirit of his younger self. After months of rehearsals, the show opened in June of that year at the Dix Hills Performing Arts Centre where Jesse sang 14 songs a night with no understudy. This led to appearances on Good Day NY and Channel 55 News. Jesse received rave reviews from the New York papers and from everyone who came and watched each night in the audience who took notice to his mature singing ability and passionate performance skills.

Shortly after the musical, Jesse was the opening act for the 80s rock band Living Colour and the headlining act at the "Rock For Haiti" benefit concert on Long Island.

=== Rising Star ===
In 2014, Kinch auditioned on the premiere episode of the US Rising Star show broadcast live on June 22 that year on ABC singing "I Put a Spell on You" by Screaming Jay Hawkins getting 92% of votes including 7% from each of all three panelists and a standing ovation. During the "duels" round on July 16 against Will Roth, he sang "Whipping Post" from The Allman Brothers Band prevailing over Roth with a 90% score (89% on West Coast vote). On "The Round of Thirteen" stage on August 3, he again excelled with "Seven Nation Army" from The White Stripes garnering 88% (87% on the West Coast) ending with best score percentage of all thirteen contestants with Austin French a close second.

In the quarterfinals on August 10 with Top 8 remaining, he performed "Money (That's What I Want)" getting 88% on both coasts with Austin French getting 89% (but 86% on the West Coast).

In the semi-finals (Top 6) where he sang "Billie Jean" from Michael Jackson, he yet again finished first among all semi-finalist with a vote 83% on both coasts and all three panelists voting "yes".

On the final broadcast on August 24, 2014, with Top 4 remaining he performed "Fortunate Son" from Creedence Clearwater Revival eliminating rival Dana Williams (87% to 30%) whereas other finalist Austin French eliminated rival Audrey Kate Geiger with a closer margin 70% to 49%. In the second and final round of the final the same day, he faced Austin French singing "Love, Reign o'er Me" from The Who, whereas French sang "Bless the Broken Road" from Rascal Flatts. Kinch clinched the title with a public vote of 76% against French's 61%. Due to the large gap between percentages, the officials changed the scores to make it appear closer. This was a common theme throughout the competition.

Rising Star performances and results
Stage	Song	Original artist	Date	Percentage		Result
Stage	Song	Original artist	Date	East Coast	West Coast	Result
Auditions	"I Put a Spell on You"	Screamin' Jay Hawkins	June 22, 2014	92%		Safe (2nd)
Duels	"Whipping Post"	The Allman Brothers Band	July 13, 2014	90%	89%	Safe (1st)
Round of 13	"Seven Nation Army"	The White Stripes	August 3, 2014	88%	87%	Safe (1st)
Quarter-finals	"Money"	Barrett Strong	August 10, 2014	88%		Safe (2nd)
Semi-finals	"Billie Jean"	Michael Jackson	August 17, 2014	83%		Safe (1st)
Finals	"Fortunate Son"	Creedence Clearwater Revival	August 24, 2014	87%	N/A	Winner
Finals	"Love, Reign o'er Me"	The Who	August 24, 2014	76%	N/A	Winner

=== Post Rising Star ===
Jesse received a recording contract with Capitol Records as a result of winning the show, but shortly parted ways due to creative differences.

After parting ways with Capitol, he began performing sold-out shows in New York and Nashville in front of larger audiences all from the exposure he received after performing on national TV.

In May 2015, Jesse performed two songs on ABC's "Dancing With The Stars" and shortly after that, he met Kerry Gordy (Industry executive and son of Berry Gordy) and Al Bell (Former head of Stax Records) who helped introduce him to Curb Records.

In early 2016, Jesse signed a record deal with Curb Records and quickly went into the studio that summer to record his long-awaited debut album. His album was recorded at Cove City Sound and Tiki Recording studios on Long Island.

=== I'm Not Like Everybody Else ===
On March 16, 2018, Jesse announced the release of two music video releases of his original song "Preaching Like The Pope" and his cover of Michael Jackson's "Billie Jean". In April, Jesse and his band embarked on a short New York tour to promote the release of his debut album I'm Not Like Everybody Else on vinyl. The tour was followed by a number of performances in Los Angeles and Nashville. In June, his album was officially released on all platforms.

On October 26, 2018, Jesse released a cover of John Lennon's "Happy X-Mas (War Is Over)".

Throughout 2019, Jesse and his band performed in many different states around the country including North Carolina, Colorado, and Missouri. He eventually made his debut overseas performance in Manchester, England at the Blackthorn Music Festival. His debut album even managed to crack two top ten charts in the U.K. Jesse performed at the 50th Anniversary Celebration of Woodstock in Bethel Woods, N.Y.

At the end of 2019, Jesse's contract with Curb Records ended and he officially parted ways with them after 3 years of working together.

=== Brain tumor ===
In January 2021 while at his parents' house on Long Island, Kinch fell unconscious and was rushed to the hospital, where he was diagnosed with a large left-sided brain tumor. He underwent surgery several months later, and an estimated 85% of the tumor was successfully removed. However, post-operative complications left him unable at the time to use his right hand to play guitar. He went through 6 weeks of radiation therapy and shortly after that began six cycles of chemotherapy, from June 2021 through February 2022. In March 2022, A social media post stated that he had finished chemotherapy and that his MRI scans were all stable.

=== Return To The Stage ===
On June 21, 2022, Jesse announced on social media that he would be returning to the stage on August 13 at the Tilles Center for the Performing Arts in Brookville, New York. Before officially returning, he was invited by Josh Groban to be a guest performer at The Jones Beach Theater in Wantagh, N.Y, which was a stop on Josh's Harmony Tour. Jesse performed his original song "How Do I Reach You(The Last Veil)" to thousands and received a standing ovation from the crowd.

On August 13, 2022, Jesse made his comeback performance at the Tilles Center for the Performing Arts in Brookville, New York to a nearly sold-out crowd. Many in attendance were fans from his home state and other states as well. His whole medical team who helped save his life were in attendance as well to support him.

Jesse's comeback story was featured on News 12 Long Island and ABC 7 NY.
