= Liesl Laurie =

South African model

Liesl Laurie-Mthombeni
- Born: Liesl Laurie; 24 December 1990 (age 35); Johannesburg, South Africa
- Education: University of Johannesburg
- Height: 1.70 m (5 ft 7 in)
- Spouse: Musa Mthombeni (m. 2021)
- Beauty pageant titleholder
- Title: Miss South Africa 2015
- Hair color: Black
- Eye color: Brown
- Major competitions: Miss South Africa 2015 (Winner); Miss World 2015 (Top 11) (Miss World Africa)

Liesl Laurie-Mthombeni (née Laurie) (born 24 December 1990 in Johannesburg, South Africa) is a South African model and beauty pageant titleholder who was crowned Miss South Africa 2015. She has represented her country at the Miss World 2015, in Sanya, China on 19 December 2015.

== Personal life ==
Laurie grew up in Eldorado Park, a mainly Coloured suburb in Johannesburg. She has a Bachelor of Commerce General degree and is a social activist.

=== Miss South Africa 2015 ===
On 29 March 2015 Laurie was crowned as Miss South Africa 2015 by reigning titleholder Zipozakhe Zokufa. The Miss South Africa Pageant was held at the Sun City Super Bowl. Laurie defeated 11 other finalists during the main event. Miss World 2014 Rolene Strauss attended the event, along with two other South Africans to have won Miss World, i.e. Penelope Coelen, Miss World 1958 and Anneline Kriel, Miss World 1974.

=== Miss World 2015 ===
As Miss South Africa, Laurie participated in the Miss World 2015 in Sanya, China, as one of 114 contestants. She was one of the Top 10 finalists and became the Continental Queen of Africa, the contestant who was placed the highest of all the African contestants.

Awards and achievements
Preceded by Rolene Strauss	Miss South Africa; 2015	Succeeded by Ntandoyenkosi Kunene
