= EGOT (disambiguation) =

EGOT is an acronym for "Emmy, Grammy, Oscar, Tony" in reference to persons who have won all four awards.

EGOT may also refer to:

- EGOT (gene), the Eosinophil Granule Ontogeny Transcript non-protein coding gene which encodes a long noncoding RNA molecule
- EGOT, the enzyme Erythrocyte Glutamic Oxaloacetic Transferase
- EGOT, the enzyme Erythrocyte Glutamate Oxaloacetate Transaminase
