= EGOT (gene) =

Human gene

Identifiers
- Aliases: EGOT, EGO, NCRNA00190, eosinophil granule ontogeny transcript (non-protein coding), eosinophil granule ontogeny transcript
- External IDs: OMIM: 611662; GeneCards: EGOT

Gene location (Human)
Chr.	Chromosome 3 (human)
Band	3p26.1	Start	4,749,192 bp
Band	3p26.1	End	4,751,590 bp
RNA expression pattern
Bgee	Human / Mouse (ortholog); Top expressed in: bone marrow cell; caput epididymis; islet of Langerhans; sural nerve; human kidney; epithelium of colon; Achilles tendon; body of pancreas; tonsil; tail of epididymis / n/a; More reference expression data
BioGPS	n/a
Orthologs
Databases	NCBI: entry; OMA: entry
Species	Human	Mouse
Entrez	100126791	n/a
Ensembl	ENSG00000235947	n/a
UniProt	n a	n/a
RefSeq (mRNA)	n/a	n/a
RefSeq (protein)	n/a	n/a
Location (UCSC)	Chr 3: 4.75 – 4.75 Mb	n/a
PubMed search		n/a
- Wikidata
View/Edit Human

EGOT, also known as Eosinophil Granule Ontogeny (EGO)† Transcript (non-protein coding), is a human gene at 3p26.1 that produces a long noncoding RNA molecule. EGOT is nested within an intron of the inositol triphosphate receptor type 1 (ITPR1) gene. The EGOT transcript is expressed during eosinophil development and is possibly involved in regulating eosinophil granule protein expression. Comparison of EGO-B, the spliced isoform, suggests EGOT may be conserved across placental mammals.

†Originally published as EGO but renamed as EGOT because 'EGO' is a real word and is therefore problematic when searching the scientific literature.
