= Miss World 2015 =

International beauty pageant

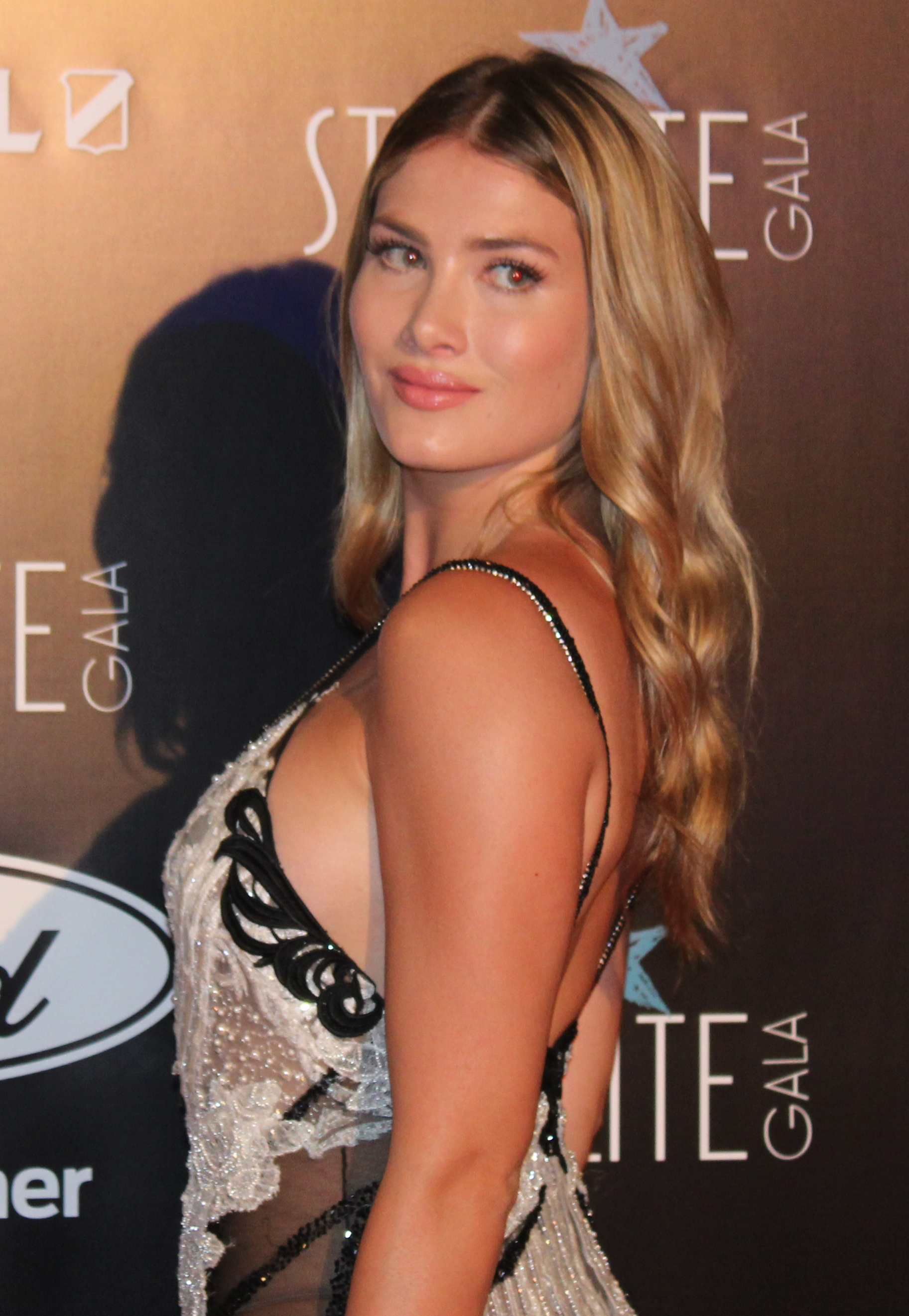
- Winner Mireia Lalaguna in 2019
- Date: 19 December 2015
- Presenters: Tim Vincent; Megan Young; Angela Chow; Neil Krisralam; Steve Douglas
- Entertainment: Yu Wenxia; The Wholls; Julian Believe
- Venue: Crown of Beauty Theatre, Sanya, China
- Broadcaster: E!; Phoenix TV
- Entrants: 114
- Placements: 20
- Withdrawals: Barbados; Belarus; Canada; Chad; Egypt; Equatorial Guinea; Ghana; Greece; Hong Kong; Israel; Kosovo; Lithuania; Luxembourg; Martinique; São Tomé and Príncipe; Switzerland
- Returns: Botswana; Bulgaria; Chile; Honduras; Kazakhstan; Macedonia; Saint Kitts and Nevis; Samoa; Zambia
- Winner: Mireia Lalaguna; Spain

Miss World 2015 was the 65th edition of the Miss World pageant, held at the Crown of Beauty Theatre in Sanya, Hainan, China, on 19 December 2015.

Rolene Strauss of South Africa crowned Mireia Lalaguna of Spain as her successor at the end of the event. It was the first time in the history of Miss World that Spain won the pageant. Since this year, the swimsuit competition (Miss World Beach Beauty) has been officially removed from the pageant. Runner-Up was Sofia Nikitchuk from Russia and third was Maria Harfanti from Indonesia.

== Returns and withdrawals ==
This edition saw the return of Botswana, Bulgaria, Chile, Honduras, Kazakhstan, Macedonia, Saint Kitts and Nevis, Samoa, and Zambia in 2013.

Barbados, Belarus, Canada, Chad, Egypt, Equatorial Guinea, Ghana, Greece, Hong Kong, Israel, Kosovo, Lithuania, Luxembourg, Martinique, São Tomé and Príncipe and Switzerland, withdrew from the competition.

Anastasia Lin of Canada, was willing and entitled to participate in the event as Miss World Canada, and the pageant still lists her as a contestant. However, up to the last minute, Lin waited for an official invitation that is necessary for Chinese visa application, but to no avail and hence missed the official deadline of 20 November 2015 for entry to the pageant and was declared persona non grata by the Chinese Government. Lin had openly criticised China's human rights violations. She was allowed by the Miss World Organization to compete at Miss World 2016.

== Results ==
=== Placements ===
Placement	Contestant
Miss World 2015	Spain – Mireia Lalaguna
1st Runner-Up	Russia – Sofia Nikitchuk
2nd Runner-Up	Indonesia – Maria Harfanti
Top 5	Jamaica – Sanneta Myrie; Lebanon – Valerie Abou Chacra
Top 11	Australia – Tess Alexander; France – Hinarere Taputu; Guyana – Lisa Punch; Philippines – Hillarie Parungao; South Africa – Liesl Laurie; Vietnam – Trần Ngọc Lan Khuê §
Top 20	Brazil – Catharina Choi Nunes; China – Yuan Lu; Ecuador – Camila Marañón; Kazakhstan – Regina Vandysheva; Netherlands – Margot Hanekamp; New Zealand – Deborah Lambie; Northern Ireland – Leanne McDowell; Poland – Marta Pałucka; Scotland – Mhairi Fergusson; South Sudan – Ajaa Deng

§ People's Choice Winner

==== Continental Queens of Beauty ====
Continental Group	Contestant
Africa	South Africa – Liesl Laurie
Americas	Brazil – Catharina Choi Nunes
Asia	Indonesia – Maria Harfanti
Caribbean	Jamaica – Sanneta Myrie
Europe	Spain – Mireia Lalaguna
Oceania	Australia – Tess Alexander

== Challenge events ==
=== Beauty with a Purpose ===
Placement	Contestant
Winner	Indonesia – Maria Harfanti
Top 10	Ecuador – Camila Marañón; El Salvador – Marcela Santamaria; Guyana – Lisa Punch; Nepal – Evana Manandhar; Nicaragua – Stefanía Alemán; Russia – Sofia Nikitchuk; Samoa – Latafale Auva'a; Tanzania – Lilian Kamazima; Zimbabwe – Annie Mutambu

=== Multimedia Challenge ===
Placement	Contestant
Winner	Philippines – Hillarie Parungao
Top 5	Guyana – Lisa Punch; India – Aditi Arya; Jamaica – Sanneta Myrie; New Zealand – Deborah Lambie

=== Sports Challenge ===
Placement	Contestant
Winner	Namibia – Steffi van Wyk
2nd place	Seychelles – Linne Freminot
3rd place	Guam – Aria Perez Theisen
Top 5	Kazakhstan – Regina Vandysheva; Samoa – Latafale Auva'a

=== Talent Challenge ===
Placement	Contestant
Winner	Guyana – Lisa Punch
2nd place	Malaysia – Brynn Zalina Lovett
3rd place	Jamaica – Sanneta Myrie
4th place	Paraguay – Giovanna Cordeiro
5th place	Samoa – Latafale Auva'a
Top 13	Australia – Tess Alexander; Bermuda – Alyssa Rose; British Virgin Islands – Sasha Wintz; Curacao – Alexandra Krijger; England – Natasha Hemmings; Indonesia – Maria Harfanti; Thailand – Thunchanok Moonnilta; Wales – Emma Jenkins
Top 30	Bahamas – Chantel O'Brian; Cameroon – Jessica Ngoua; Chile – Fernanda Sobarzo; China – Yuan Lu; Costa Rica – Angélica Reyes; Finland – Angélica Reyes; Guadeloupe – Arlène Tacite; Iceland – Arna Ýr Jónsdóttir; India – Aditi Arya; Myanmar – Khin Thein Myint; Namibia – Steffi van Wyk; New Zealand – Deborah Lambie; Philippines – Hillarie Parungao; Puerto Rico – Keysi Vargas; Slovenia – Mateja Kociper; South Africa – Liesl Laurie; Spain – Mireia Lalaguna; United States – Victoria Mendoza

=== Top Model Challenge ===
Placement	Contestant
Winner	Spain – Mireia Lalaguna
Top 5	France – Hinarere Taputu; Puerto Rico – Keysi Vargas; Russia – Sofia Nikitchuk; Italy – Greta Galassi
Top 30	Albania – Kristina Bakiu; Argentina – Daniela Mirón; Australia – Tess Alexander; Austria – Annika Grill; Brazil – Catharina Choi; Cameroon – Jessica Ngoua; China – Yuan Lu; Côte d'Ivoire – Andréa N'Guessan; Ethiopia – Kisanet Teklehaimanot; Georgia – Nuka Karalashvili; Honduras – Gabriela Salazar; India – Aditi Arya; Ireland – Sacha Livingstone; Japan – Chika Nakagawa; Kazakhstan – Regina Vandysheva; Lebanon – Valerie Abou Chacra; Netherlands – Margot Hanekamp; Paraguay – Giovanna Cordeiro; Philippines – Hillarie Parungao; Poland – Marta Pałucka; South Africa – Liesl Laurie; South Sudan – Ajaa Deng; Sweden –Natalia Fogelund; Venezuela – Anyela Galante; Vietnam – Trần Ngọc Lan Khuê

==== World Designer Award ====
The world designer event was also the first stage of the Miss World Top Model Challenge Event, which takes place on 12 December.

Placement	Contestant
Winner	Vietnam – Trần Ngọc Lan Khuê
Top 10	Bosnia and Herzegovina – Marijana Marković; Brazil – Catharina Choi; Côte d'Ivoire – Andréa N'Guessan; Guadeloupe – Arlène Tacite; India – Aditi Arya; Indonesia – Maria Harfanti; Italy – Greta Galassi; Mongolia – Anu Namshir; Puerto Rico – Keysi Vargas

== Judges ==
The judges panel for Miss World 2015 were:

- Julia Morley – Chairman of the Miss World Organization
- Mike Dixon – Musical Director
- Ken Warwick – Hollywood producer and executive producer and director of Miss World
- Andrew Minarik – head of the team for Miss World Hair & Beauty
- Donna Walsh – professional dancer and director
- Linda Pétursdóttir – Miss World 1988 from Iceland
- Agbani Darego – Miss World 2001 from Nigeria
- Azra Akın – Miss World 2002 from Turkey
- Zhang Zilin – Miss World 2007 from China PR
- Ksenia Sukhinova – Miss World 2008 from Russia
- Liliana Tanoesoedibjo – CEO of Media Nusantara Citra, Owner and National Director of Miss Indonesia

== Contestants ==
114 delegates competed in Miss World 2015.

Country/Territory	Contestant	Age (Note: Ages at the time in the pageant)	Hometown
Albania	Kristina Bakiu	20	Tirana
Argentina	Daniela Mirón	22	Malargüe
Aruba	Nicole Van Tellingen	20	Oranjestad
Australia	Tess Alexander	24	Brisbane
Austria	Annika Grill	21	Gmunden
(The Bahamas) Bahamas	Chantel O'Brian	21	Nassau
Belgium	Leylah Alliët	22	Roeselare
Belize	Jasmin Jael Rhamdas	19	Belmopan
Bermuda	Alyssa Rose	22	Hamilton
Bolivia	Vivian Serrano	22	Santa Cruz
Bosnia and Herzegovina	Marijana Marković	20	Prnjavor
Botswana	Seneo Mabengano	19	Selebi-Phikwe
Brazil	Catharina Choi Nunes	25	São Paulo
British Virgin Islands	Sasha Wintz	18	Tortola
Bulgaria	Veneta Krasteva	23	Sofia
Cameroon	Jessica Ngoua	24	Douala
Chile	Fernanda Sobarzo	20	Santiago
China	Yuan Lu	21	Hefei
Colombia	María Alejandra López Pérez	21	Pereira
Costa Rica	Angélica Reyes	20	San José
(Ivory Coast) Côte d'Ivoire	Andréa N'Guessan	22	Yamoussoukro
Croatia	Maja Spahija	22	Šibenik
Curaçao	Alexandra Krijger	18	Willemstad
Cyprus	Rafaela Charalampous	25	Nicosia
Czech Republic	Andrea Kalousová	19	Jaroměř
Denmark	Jessica Hvirvelkær	18	Aarhus
Dominican Republic	Cinthya Núñez	23	San Francisco
Ecuador	María Camila Marañón Solorzano	20	Chone
El Salvador	Marcela Santamaria	24	San Salvador
England	Natasha Hemmings	19	Cheshire
Ethiopia	Kisanet Teklehaimanot	21	Adigrat
Fiji	Brittany Hazelman	24	Suva
Finland	Carola Miller	24	Helsinki
France	Hinarere Taputu	25	Tahiti
Gabon	Reine Ngotala	18	Tchibanga
(Georgia (country)) Georgia	Nuka Karalashvili	24	Tbilisi
Germany	Albijona Muharremaj	20	Munich
Gibraltar	Hannah Bado	22	Gibraltar
Guadeloupe	Arlène Tacite	22	Basse-Terre
Guam	Aria Perez Theisen	19	Barrigada
Guatemala	María José Larrañaga	24	Guatemala City
Guinea	Mama Aissata Diallo	19	Conakry
Guyana	Lisa Punch	24	Georgetown
Haiti	Seydina Allen	24	Port-au-Prince
Honduras	Gabriela Salazar	24	Tegucigalpa
Hungary	Daniella Kiss	21	Bag
Iceland	Arna Ýr Jónsdóttir	20	Kópavogur
India	Aditi Arya	22	Gurgaon
Indonesia	Maria Harfanti	23	Yogyakarta
(Republic of Ireland) Ireland	Sacha Livingstone	20	Dublin
Italy	Greta Galassi	17	Rovereto
Jamaica	Sanneta Myrie	24	Kingston
Japan	Chika Nakagawa	20	Niigata
Kazakhstan	Regina Vandysheva	22	Almaty
Kenya	Charity Mwangi	24	Kiambu County
Kyrgyzstan	Tattybubu Samidin-Kyzy	20	Osh
Latvia	Lāsma Zemene	20	Riga
Lebanon	Valerie Abou Chacra	23	Beirut
Lesotho	Relebohile Kobeli	19	Maseru
(North Macedonia) Macedonia	Emilija Rozman	24	Skopje
Malaysia	Brynn Zalina Lovett	22	Beaufort
Malta	Katrina Pavia	25	Victoria
Mauritius	Aurellia Bégué	19	Port Louis
Mexico	Yamelin Ramírez Cota	22	Navojoa
Moldova	Anastasia Iacub	19	Băcioi
Mongolia	Anu Namshir	24	Ulaanbaatar
Montenegro	Nataša Milosavljević	24	Herceg Novi
Myanmar	Khin Thein Myint	24	Mandalay
Namibia	Steffi van Wyk	20	Windhoek
Nepal	Evana Manandhar	24	Kathmandu
Netherlands	Margot Hanekamp	19	Nijkerk
New Zealand	Deborah Lambie	25	Auckland
Nicaragua	Stefanía Alemán	24	Masatepe
Nigeria	Unoaku Anyadike	21	Ibadan
Northern Ireland	Leanne McDowell	19	Cookstown
Norway	Fay Teresa Vålbekk	23	Oslo
Panama	Diana Jaén	24	Penonomé
Paraguay	Giovanna Cordeiro	25	Asunción
Peru	Karla Chocano	24	Trujillo
Philippines	Hillarie Parungao	24	Solano
Poland	Marta Pałucka	24	Sopot
Portugal	Rafaela Pardete	24	Setúbal
Puerto Rico	Keysi Vargas Vélez	24	Quebradillas
Romania	Natalia Onet	26	Satu Mare
Russia	Sofia Nikitchuk	22	Yekaterinburg
Saint Kitts and Nevis	Jackiema Flemming	22	Basseterre
Samoa	Alofa Dawn Latafale Auva'a	22	Apia
Scotland	Mhairi Fergusson	21	Stirling
Serbia	Marija Ćetković	20	Novi Sad
Seychelles	Linne Freminot	22	Mahé
Singapore	Charity Lu	24	Singapore
Slovakia	Lujza Straková	21	Banská Bystrica
Slovenia	Mateja Kociper	24	Maribor
South Africa	Liesl Laurie	24	Johannesburg
South Korea (Note: Competed as Korea in the pageant)	Chyung Eun-ju	22	Seoul
South Sudan	Ajaa Deng	23	Juba
Spain	Mireia Lalaguna	23	Barcelona
Sri Lanka	Thilini Amarasooriya	20	Colombo
Sweden	Natalia Fogelund	21	Gothenburg
Tanzania	Lilian Kamazima	19	Arusha
Thailand	Thunchanok Moonnilta	22	Chiang Mai
Trinidad and Tobago	Kimberly Farrah Singh	21	Port of Spain
Tunisia	Maroua Heni	24	Sidi Bouzid
Turkey	Ecem Çırpan	19	Bursa
Uganda	Zahara Nakiyaga	24	Kampala
Ukraine	Khrystyna Stoloka	18	Kyiv
United States	Victoria Mendoza	20	Phoenix
United States Virgin Islands	Jahne Massac	19	St. Thomas
Uruguay	Sherika De Armas †	18	Montevideo
Venezuela	Anyela Galante Salerno	24	Guanare
Vietnam	Trần Ngọc Lan Khuê	23	Ho Chi Minh City
Wales	Emma Victoria Jenkins	22	Llanelli
Zambia	Michelo Malambo	24	Ndola
Zimbabwe	Annie Grace Farayi Mutambu	19	Harare

– 2015 contestants source:

== Notes ==
=== Designations ===
- Belize – Jasmin Jael Rhamdas was appointed "Miss World Belize 2015" after a casting call was organised by Michael Arnold, national director of Miss World Belize.
- Costa Rica – Angelica Reyes was appointed "Miss Costa Rica Mundo 2015" by Allan Aleman national director for Miss World in Costa Rica after a casting call was organised by Reinas de Costa Rica organisation franchise holder for Miss World in Costa Rica.
- Curaçao – Alexandra Krijger was appointed "Miss World Curaçao 2015" by Dushi-Magazine, franchise holders for Miss World in Curaçao after the pageant was not held due to lack of funding and sponsorships. Krijger was the 3rd runner-up at the Miss Curaçao World 2014 pageant.
- El Salvador – Marcela Santamaría was appointed to represent El Salvador by Liz De Castaneda, national director of Nuestra Belleza El Salvador after the national pageant was postponed until January 2016. Santamaría was crowned Reinado de El Salvador International 2011.
- Guyana – Lisa Punch was selected as Guyana's representative to Miss World 2015 by the national director of Miss World Guyana, Natasha Martaindale, after the Miss World Guyana 2015 pageant was cancelled due to lack of applicants and the upcoming General elections in Guyana. Punch was chosen from the few applicants who applied for the pageants 2015 edition before it was cancelled. She was a finalist at ABC's Rising Star show.
- Macedonia – Emilija Rozman was appointed "Miss Makedonija 2015" by Lidija Velkovska, national director of Miss Macedonia pageant.
- Norway – Fay Teresa Vålbekk was appointed "Miss World Norway 2015" at a casting call held by Morten Sommerfeldt, national director of Miss World Norway. Vålbekk was the 1st runner-up at the Frøken Norge 2011 pageant.
- Paraguay – Giovanna Cordeiro was chosen "Miss Mundo Paraguay 2015" by Promociones Gloria, franchise holders for Miss World in Paraguay. Nuestra Belleza Paraguay was not held this year due to lack of time in organising the pageant hence the representatives to various international pageants were chosen in a closed door election from the contestants of Nuestra Belleza Paraguay 2014.Cordeiro was the 3rd runner-up at Nuestra Belleza Paraguay 2014.
- Romania – Natalia Onet was appointed "Miss World Romania 2015" by Ernest Hadrian Böhm the president of Miss World Romania after a casting call was organised by ExclusivEvent agency franchise holders for Miss World in Romania.
- Saint Kitts and Nevis – Jackiema Flemming was appointed "Miss World St. Kitts & Nevis 2015" by Eversley Liburd and Joan Millard, franchise holders for Miss World in St. Kitts & Nevis. Flemming was the 2nd runner-up at the St. Kitts & Nevis National Carnival Queen Pageant 2014–2015.
- Samoa – Latafale Auva'a, the reigning Miss Samoa and Miss Pacific Islands, was appointed to represent Samoa at Miss World 2015 by Ulalemamae Te'eva Matafai, national director of Miss World Samoa.
- South Korea – Jung Eun-ju was appointed "Miss World Korea 2015" by Park Jeong-ah, national director of Miss World Korea, after the pageant was postponed to late November this year. Jung was the 1st runner-up at the Miss World Korea 2014 pageant.
- United States Virgin Islands – Jahne Issac was appointed "Miss US Paraside World 2015" after a casting call was held by Miss US Paraside organisation.

=== Replacements ===
- Albania – Kristina Bakiu was appointed to represent Albania by Vera Grabocka, President of Miss & Mister Albania after she decided to replace Daniela Pajaziti for undisclosed reasons. Bakiu was crowned Miss Universe Albania 2013, but was unable to compete at Miss Universe 2013 due to age issues.
- Brazil – Catharina Choi was crowned "Miss Mundo Brasil 2015", after Ana Luisa Castro the original winner voluntarily relinquished her title when it was discovered that she had been married to Belgian model and actor, Tanguy Backer before entering the pageant. Nunes was the 1st runner-up at the Miss Mundo Brasil 2015 pageant.
- Bulgaria – Veneta Kristeva was appointed "Miss World Bulgaria 2015" by the Miss Bulgaria organisation, as a replacement to Simona Evgenieva, Miss Bulgaria 2014, who will not be able to participate in Miss World because of a scheduling conflict with the Miss Bulgaria 2015 finals. Kristeva was crowned Miss Universe Bulgaria 2013.
- France – Hinarere Taputu was appointed "Miss World France 2015" by the national director of Miss France, Sylvie Tellier, as a replacement to Camille Cerf, Miss France 2015, who will not be able to participate in Miss World because of a scheduling conflict, as she crowns her successor on the same day as the Miss World 2015 finals. Taputu represented Tahiti at Miss France 2015 and was the 1st runner-up at the pageant.
- Netherlands – Margot Hanekamp was appointed to compete at Miss World 2015 by the Miss Nederland Organization when the winner of Miss Nederland 2015 pageant, Jessie Jazz chose to compete at Miss Universe 2015. This year the winner of Miss Nederland pageant was crowned to participate at both Miss Universe and Miss World contests but this is impossible due to the conflicting dates of the Miss Universe and Miss World pageants. Hanekamp was the 1st runner-up at the Miss Nederland 2015 pageant.
- Tanzania – Lilian Kamazima was crowned "Miss Tanzania 2014" as the original winner Sitti Mtemvu, resigned after she was accused for a scandal regarding her age. Kamazima was the 1st runner-up at the Miss Tanzania 2014 pageant.
- Tunisia – Maroua Heni was selected "Miss Tunisie 2015", after Rawia Djebli the original winner was stripped of her title for failing to fulfill her obligations by Aida Antar, the President of Miss Tunisie Organisation. Heny was chosen at a separate private selection organised by Association TEJ franchise holders for Miss World in Tunisia. She represented Sidi Bouzid Governorate at Miss Tunisie 2015 and placed in the top 10 at the pageant.
- Zimbabwe – Annie Mutambu was chosen "Miss Zimbabwe 2015", after Emily Kachote the previous winner of the pageant was stripped of her title when her nude pictures circulated on social media. Mutambu was the 1st runner-up at the Miss Zimbabwe 2015 pageant. For the second consecutive year, the pageant's winner has been stripped of her title for a similar scandal.

=== Withdrawals ===
- Barbados
- Belarus
- Chad - Elise Dagosse - did not compete.
- Egypt - Lara Debbane - withdrew due to personal reasons.
- Equatorial Guinea
- Ghana - Antoinette Delali Kernavor was supposed to compete in this edition, but she was allocated to Miss World 2016 instead, where she made it into the top 20.
- Greece - Katerina Galiatsatou - did not compete.
- Hong Kong
- Israel - Maayan Keren - did not compete.
- Kosovo - the host country does not recognize Kosovo as an independent country.
- Lithuania
- Luxembourg - Vonessa Alijaj - did not compete.
- Martinique
- São Tomé and Príncipe
- Switzerland

=== Did not compete ===
- Algeria – Rym Amari, Miss Algerie 2013 was appointed to represent Algeria by Faisal Hamdad, the President of Miss Algerie Organisation however Amari withdrew from the Miss World competition just days before kick-off due to visa issues. Last year Fatma Zohra Chouaib, Miss Algerie 2014 could not compete at Miss World 2014 because of the same problem. Algeria would have returned to Miss World after its debut in 2002.
- Guinea Bissau – Laila Da Costa was crowned Miss Guiné - Bissau 2014 to participate at Miss World 2014 however Da Costa couldn't compete due to visa issues. She was expected to compete at the 2015 edition but withdrew because of the same problem.

== General references ==
- "Contestants 2015". missworld.com.
