= Aygerim Kozhakanova =

Kazakh beauty pageant titleholder (born 1994)

- Әйгерім Қожақанова
- Born: October 16, 1994 (age 31); Almaty, Kazakhstan
- Height: 1.75 m (5 ft 9 in)
- Beauty pageant titleholder
- Title: Miss Almaty 2013
- Hair color: Brown
- Eye color: Green
- Major competitions: Miss Kazakhstan 2013 (Appointed as Miss Universe Kazakhstan 2013); Miss Universe 2013

Äigerım Qojaqanova (Kazakh: Әйгерім Қожақанова; born 16 October 1994) is a Kazakh beauty pageant titleholder who was crowned Miss Kazakhstan 2013 for Miss Universe 2013. She competed at the pageant in Moscow, Russia.

== Miss Kazakhstan 2013 ==
Qojaqanova was crowned as Miss Universe Kazakhstan 2013 after Zhazira Nurimbetova withdrew from competing at the Miss Universe 2013. Qojaqanova was appointed to represent Kazakhstan at the Miss Universe 2013. She won the title of Miss Almaty 2013.

Awards and achievements
Preceded by Valeriya Aleinikova	Miss Universe Kazakhstan; 2013	Succeeded by Zhazira Nurimbetova
