= Kentau =

Kentau Kentau Кентау
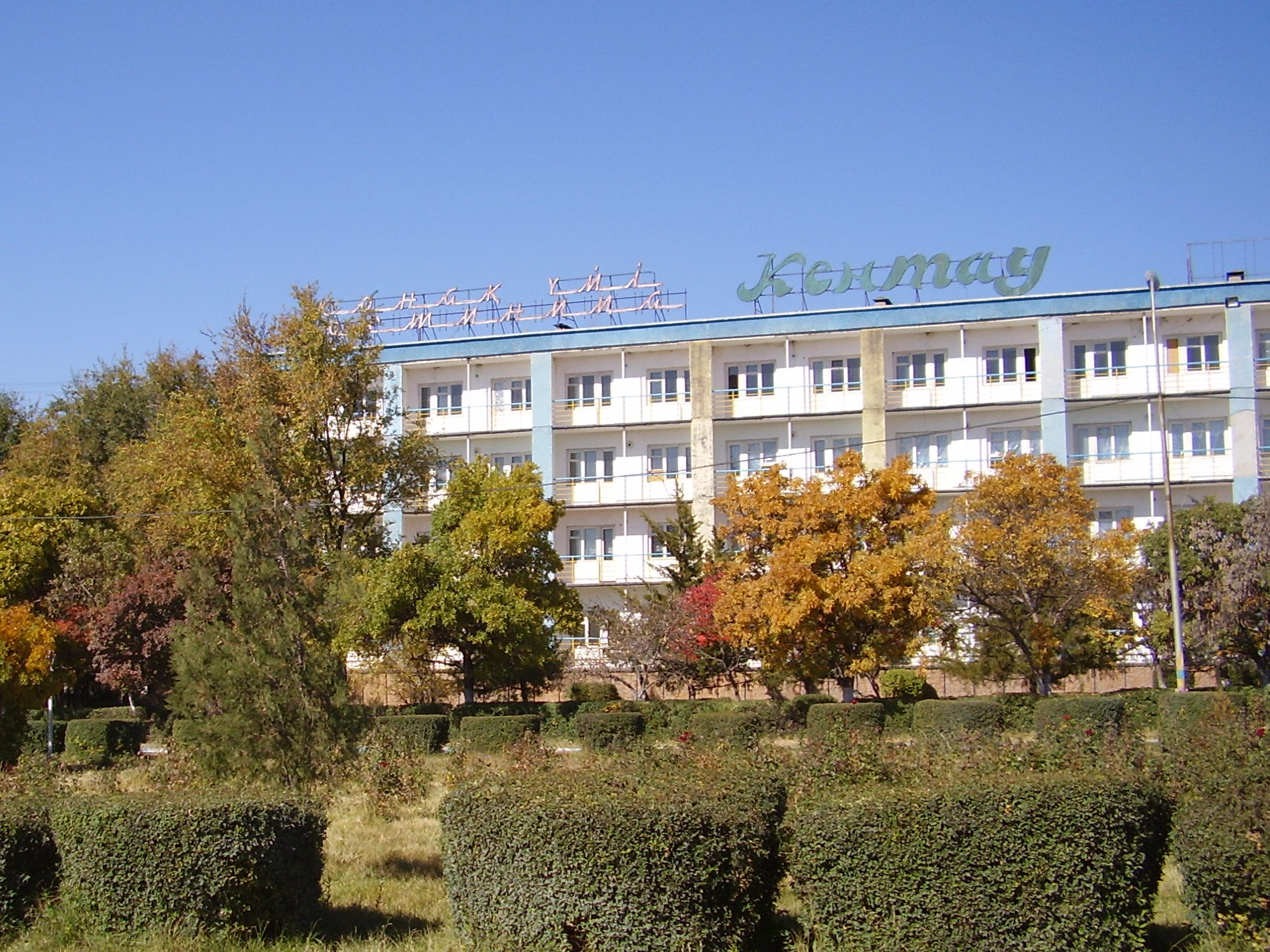

- Seal

- Location in Kazakhstan
- Coordinates: 43°31′N 68°31′E
- Country: Kazakhstan
- Region: Turkistan Region

Government
  - Akim (mayor): Zhandos Tasov

Area
  - City: 77.45 km^{2} (29.90 sq mi)

Population (2009)
  - City: 81,484
  - Urban: 57,121
- Climate: BSk

Kentau (Note: Kazakh: Кентау [kʰʲentʰɑ́w]) is a town in Turkistan Region, in southern Kazakhstan, located at the foot of the Karatau mountains 30 km northeast of the city of Turkestan. Population: 57,121 (2009 census results); 55,521 (1999 census results).

== History ==
Kentau was formed in August 1955. In Soviet times, the population of the city was mainly from Russia, the descendants of the repressed: Greeks, Russians, Germans, Koreans, Jews, Chechens, etc., as well as Uzbeks, and majority of population comprising an ethnic Kazakhs. Major mining ore operations are supported by excavator and transformer plants. The late 1980s or early 1990s saw massive emigration of population and the closures of mines and industrial enterprises. Today, the population is approximately 80,000, mostly Kazakhs.

== Industry ==
There are two plants in Kentau: Transformer Plant and Excavator Plant. Both of them were famous in the USSR. Nowadays Excavator Plant is working, but not so active as about 25–30 years ago.

== Notable residents ==
- Russian pop singer Linda was born in Kentau on 29 April 1977.
- Kazakh futsal player Dinmukhambet Suleimanov was born in Kentau on 8 January 1981.
