= Miss South Africa =

South Africa beauty pageant

Miss South Africa Organization
- Formation: 1943; 83 years ago
- Purpose: Beauty pageant
- Headquarters: Johannesburg
- Location: South Africa
- Official language: English
- Owner: Dr. Prescious Moloi Motsepe
- Partner: Sun International
- Co-Chairs: Basetsana Makgalemele-Khumalo; Peggy Sue Khumalo
- Website: www.misssa.co.za

Miss South Africa is a national beauty pageant in South Africa. The Miss South Africa organisation resorted to a contemporary format in selecting representatives which was inaugurated in 2018.

== History ==
Established in 1956, the first official Miss South Africa pageant was organized to send a representative to London for the Miss World pageant. That year Norma Vorster was crowned Miss South Africa. Two years later, an 18-year-old secretary from Durban, Penny Coelen, was crowned and would later go on to make history and win Miss World.

It was not until 1977 that all persons of all races were allowed to compete in the Miss SA competition. Prior to that, people of colour competed in the Miss Africa South pageant, which was renamed Miss Black South Africa in 1977.

This was just the beginning for the Miss South Africa organisation; of the 60 women who have worn the crown, only the last 27 winners have been chosen from the entire population of South Africa and not just white individuals. Since then, hundreds of young women have entered the pageant vying for the title.

Miss South Africa (or a runner-up in some instances) has always competed at Miss World, but the first Miss South Africa to compete at Miss Universe was Kerishnie Naiker in 1998.

Prior to 1998, South Africa's representatives at Miss Universe qualified via other national pageants.

Three Miss South Africas, namely Rolene Strauss, Anneline Kriel and Penelope Coelen, have won the Miss World titles in 2014, 1974 and 1958 respectively. Three women from South Africa have won the title of Miss Universe - Margaret Gardiner in 1978, Demi-Leigh Nel-Peters in 2017 and Zozibini Tunzi in 2019.

Prior to the establishment of the official Miss South Africa, South African Pictorial ("The Union's National Weekly") held annual Beauty Competitions starting in 1923. This evolved later into Miss South Africa. The first winner of this prize was Mrs. Doris Ferramosca (née Doris Gwendoline Helliwell).

In 2020, Miss South Africa franchised the Miss Supranational license. In 2022, Miss South Africa 2021, Lalela Mswane became the first South African woman have won the title of Miss Supranational.

In 2025 Miss South Africa decided to relinquish all international licenses which was a first for Miss South Africa. It was also the first time that the reigning Miss South Africa did not represent South Africa internationally since 1985 when the country was barred because of the Apartheid Policy. They resorted to a contemporary strategy to let Miss South Africa serve the country rather than just being an international ambassador.

== International crowns by year ==
- Penelope Coelen, Miss World 1958
- Anneline Kriel, Miss World 1974
- Margaret Gardiner, Miss Universe 1978
- Rolene Strauss, Miss World 2014
- Demi-Leigh Nel-Peters, Miss Universe 2017
- Zozibini Tunzi, Miss Universe 2019
- Lalela Mswane, Miss Supranational 2022

== Titleholders ==
Year	Miss South Africa	Runners Up		Ref.
Year	Miss South Africa	1st Princess	2nd Princess	Ref.
Miss South Africa – Single Pageant
1923	Doris Ferramosca	W. J. van Blommestein	Marjorie Elizabeth Cowley	
1943	Susie Smuts	Unknown	Unknown	
1956	Norma Vorster	Gloria Keeley	Virginia Burman	
1957	Adele Kruger	Jessie Waring	Denise Nichols	
1958	Penelope Coelen	Rosemary Whitlock	Debbie du Toit	
1959	Moya Meaker	Sophie Pieters	Kitty Green	
1960	Denise Muir	Dorothy Farquhar	Stella Pithey	
1961	Yvonne Hulley	Marlene Boyes	Rita Rheeder	
1962	Yvonne Ficker	Ellen Liebenberg	Madeleine Usher	
1963	Louise Crous	Jennifer Slater	Maureen van Niekerk	
1964	Vedra Karamitas	Lorraine Mason	Virginia Scott-King	
1965	Carol Davis	Diane Webster	Ann Barber	
1966	Johanna Carter	Dawn Duff-Gray	Margo Galbraith	
1967	Disa Duivestein	Mary McDonald	Tiny de Lange	
1968	Mitzianna Stander	Linda Collett	Patsy Goswell	
1969	Linda Collett	Diana Newman	Jackie Sayer	
1970	Jillian Jessup	Wendith Brink	Dorothea Scott	
1971	Monica Fairall	Merle Worsley	Maria Claassen	
1972	Stephanie Reinecke	Robin-Gail Hargreaves	Carolien van Niekerk	
1973	Shelley Latham	Janet Sanderson	Theresa Rood	
1974	Anneline Kriel	Ruanne Louw	Anita Michas	
1975	Helga Vera Johns	Crystal Cooper	Rhoda Rademeyer	
1976	Lynn Massyn	Louise Withfield	Jan Kiggan	
1977	Vanessa Wannenburg	Elizabeth Bunting	Marilyn Albutt	
1978	Yolanda Kloppers	Monique Hare	Dawn Chapman	
1979	Karen Sickel	Gail Rocher	Wendy Ross	
1980	Sandra McCrystal	Kim Aston	Fiona White	
1981	Linda Phillips	Elmarie van Aswegen	Susan Schuttler	
Miss South Africa – Rapport
1982	Odette Scrooby	Andrea Stelzer	Gail Sylvester	
Miss South Africa – Sunday Times
1982	Sandra de Meyer	Jennifer Smith	Kathy Goodwin	
Miss South Africa – Rapport
1983	Leanne Hosking	Karen Maingard	Cathy Steed	
1984	Laetitia Snyman	Andrea Stelzer		
Miss South Africa – Sunday Times
1984	Lorna Potgieter	Colleen Redman	Patience Craig	
Miss South Africa – Single Pageant
1985	Andrea Stelzer	Sandy McCormack	Lorna-Anne Findlay	
1986	Sandy McCormack	Nancy Riach	Marie-Louise le Roux	
1987	Wilma van der Bijl	Robyn Poole	Janine Botbyl	
1988	Janine Botbyl	Roberta Alessandri	Mache Booysen	
1989	Michelle Bruce	Helen Lewis	Deborah Good	
1990	Suzette van der Merwe	Olivia Scrooby	Cheryl Coombe-Davis	
1991	Diana Tilden-Davis	Amy Kleinhans	Sasha-Lee Walton	
1992	Amy Kleinhans	Augustine Masilela	Lisa King	
1993	Jacqui Mofokeng	Corinne Durrheim	Marelize Steyn	
1994	Basetsana Makgalemele	Sonia Kempff	Helen Macleod	
1995	Bernelee Daniell	Vanashree Moodley	Natalie Benard	
1996	Peggy-Sue Khumalo	Babalwa Mneno	Adele van Niekerk	
1997	Kerishnie Naiker	Jessica Motaung	Petro van Zyl	
1998	Sonia Raciti	Heidi van Zyl	Keziah Jooste	
1999	Heather Joy Hamilton	Nadia Wyngaard	Pulane Moraladi	
2000	Jo-Ann Strauss	Layla Jeevananthum	Claire Drew	
2001	Vanessa Do Céu Carreira	Claire Sabbagha	Bonneventia Pule	
2002	Cindy Nell	Tammy-Anne Fortuin	Bridget Masinga	
2003	Joan Ramagoshi	Marissa Eggli	Siza Majola	
2004	Claudia Henkel	Dhiveja Sundrum	Sharon Arigye-Mushabe	
2005	Nokuthula Sithole	Avumile Qongqo	Matapa Maila	
2006	Megan Coleman	Brigid Osborne	Tracey-Lee Flanders	
2007	Tansey Coetzee	Avumile Qongqo	Manisha Pillay	
2008	Tatum Keshwar	Anja van Zyl	Buyi Shongwe	
2009	Nicole Flint	Matapa Maila	Lisa van Zyl	
2010	Bokang Montjane	Dhesha Jeram	Bianca Coutinho	
2011	Melinda Bam	Remona Moodley	Thuli Sangweni	
2012	Marilyn Ramos	Stacey Webb	Pearl Nxele	
2014	Rolene Strauss	Ziphozakhe Zokufa	Matlala Mokoko	
2014	Ziphozakhe Zokufa (Note: After the winner won an international pageant, the runner-up replaced her as Miss South Africa)	Matlala Mokoko	No Replacement	
2015	Liesl Laurie	Refilwe Mthimunye	Ntsiki Mkhize	
2016	Ntandoyenkosi Kunene	Elizabeth Molapo	Tayla Skye Robinson	
2017	Demi-Leigh Nel-Peters	Adè van Heerden	Boipelo Mabe	
2017	Adè van Heerden	Boipelo Mabe	No Replacement	
Year	Miss South Africa	Miss Universe South Africa	Miss World South Africa	Ref.
2018	Tamaryn Green	Tamaryn Green	Thulisa Keyi	
2019	Zozibini Tunzi	Zozibini Tunzi	Sasha-Lee Olivier	
2019	Sasha-Lee Olivier	Zozibini Tunzi	Sasha-Lee Olivier	
Year	Miss South Africa	Runners Up		Ref.
Year	Miss South Africa	1st Runner Up	2nd Runner Up	Ref.
2020	Shudufhadzo Musida	Thato Mosehle	Natasha Joubert	
2021	Lalela Mswane	Zimi Mabunzi	Moratwe Masima	
2022	Ndavi Nokeri	Ayanda Gugulethu Thabethe	Lebogang Mahlangu	
2023	Natasha Joubert	Bryoni Govender	Nande Mabala	
2024	Mia le Roux	Nompumelelo Maduna	Onalenna Constantin	
2025	Qhawekazi Mazaleni	Luyanda Zuma	Karabo Mareka	
2026	Tiyani Makamu	Cwenga Koyana Kotu-Rammopo	Lesego Khumo Nyathela	

=== International Competitions ===
List of Titleholders under Miss South Africa Organization

The following women have represented South Africa in two of the Big Four major international beauty pageants for women. These are Miss World and Miss Universe; Miss International and Miss Earth are held by separate national beauty pageants in South Africa.

==== Miss Universe South Africa ====
On some occasions, the winner of Miss South Africa represents her country at the Miss Universe pageant. Prior to 1982, the winner of the Miss RSA pageant represented South Africa at Miss Universe, under Rapport. Rapport would continue to hold the Miss Universe license through 1984, but would change the name of the pageant to Miss South Africa, which resulted in a dispute with the main Miss South Africa contest which was organized under the Sunday Times which lasted until 1985, where the two organizers merged their pageants together. Prior to 1998, the winner of the individual Miss Universe South Africa compete at Miss Universe. From 1981-1983 and in 1979, delegates from two of South Africa's Bantustans competed at Miss Universe.

Year	Province	Miss Universe South Africa	Placement at Miss Universe	Special Awards	Notes
2024	Western Cape	Mia le Roux	Did not compete		
2023	Gauteng	Bryoni Govender	Top 20	Voice For Change (Top 10)	
2022	Limpopo	Ndavi Nokeri	Top 16		
2021	KwaZulu-Natal	Lalela Mswane	2nd Runner-up		
2020	Gauteng	Natasha Joubert	Unplaced		
2019	Eastern Cape	Zozibini Tunzi	Miss Universe 2019		
2018	Western Cape	Tamaryn Green	1st Runner-up		
2017	Western Cape	Demi-Leigh Nel-Peters	Miss Universe 2017		
2016	Mpumalanga	Ntandoyenkosi Kunene	Unplaced		
2015	Gauteng	Refilwe Mthimunye	Top 15		
2014	Eastern Cape	Ziphozakhe Zokufa	Unplaced		
2013	North West	Marilyn Ramos	Unplaced		
2012	Gauteng	Melinda Bam	Top 10		
2011	Gauteng	Bokang Montjane	Unplaced		
2010	Gauteng	Nicole Flint	Top 10		8th place overall
2009	KwaZulu-Natal	Tatum Keshwar	Top 10		8th place overall
2008	Gauteng	Tansey Coetzee	Top 15	Best National Costume (Top 10); 13th place overall	
2007	KwaZulu-Natal	Megan Coleman	Unplaced		
2006	Gauteng	Nokuthula "Thuli" Sithole	Unplaced		
2005	Gauteng	Claudia Henkel	Top 15		
2004	Gauteng	Joan Ramagoshi	Unplaced		
2003	Gauteng	Cindy Nell	2nd Runner-up		
2002	Gauteng	Vanessa Do Ceu Carreira	3rd Runner-up		
2001	Western Cape	Jo-Ann Strauss	Unplaced		
2000	Gauteng	Heather Joy Hamilton	Top 10		10th place
1999	Gauteng	Sonia Raciti	Top 5		4th runner up
1998	KwaZulu-Natal	Kerishnie Naiker	Top 10		7th place
Miss Universe South Africa
1997	KwaZulu-Natal	Mbali Gasa	Unplaced		
1996	Gauteng	Carol Becker	Unplaced		
1995	Gauteng	Augustine Masilela	Top 10		7th place
Did not compete between 1985—1994 as the country was barred from competing due to the country's practice of apartheid
Miss South Africa and Miss Transkei
1984	Transvaal (Gauteng) (Note: After the end of apartheid, the province of Transvaal was split into Gauteng, Limpopo, Mpumalanga, and eastern part of North West Province.)	Letitia "Tisha" Snyman	1st Runner-up		
1983	Natal (KwaZulu-Natal) (Note: After the end of apartheid, the province of Natal was redesignated as the Province of KwaZulu-Natal after the KwaZulu bantustan was reintergrated into the province.)	Leanne Beverly Hosking	Unplaced		
1983	Transkei (Eastern Cape) (Note: Transkei became part of the Eastern Cape after the reintegration of the Bantustans at the end of apartheid in South Africa.)	Nomxousi Xokelelo	Unplaced		Competed as Transkei
1982	Transvaal (Gauteng)	Odette Octavia Scrooby	Top 12		6th place
1982	Transkei (Eastern Cape)	Noxolisi Mji	Unplaced		Competed as Transkei
Miss Republic of South Africa / Miss RSA, Miss Transkei and Miss Bophuthatswana
1981	Natal (KwaZulu-Natal)	Daniela di Paolo	Unplaced		
1981	Transkei (Eastern Cape)	Kedibone Tembisa Letlaka	Unplaced		Competed as Transkei
1980	Transvaal (Gauteng)	Jenny Kay	Did not compete		
1979	Transvaal (Gauteng)	Veronica Wilson	Top 12		6th place
1979	Bophuthatswana (Mmabatho, North West) (Note: Mmabatho, Bophuthatswana was later reintegrated into North West Province of South Africa.)	Alina Moeketse	Unplaced		Competed as Bophuthatswana
1979	Transkei (Eastern Cape)	Lindiwe Bam	Unplaced		Competed as Transkei
1978	Cape Province (Western Cape) (Note: Cape Town was part of the province of Cape of Good Hope before it was split into Western, Eastern, and Northern Cape Provinces in 1994.)	Margaret Gardiner	Miss Universe 1978		
1977	Cape Province (Western Cape)	Glynis Fester	Unplaced		
1976	Cape Province (Western Cape)	Cynthia Claasen	Unplaced		
1975	Cape Province (Western Cape)	Gail Anthony	Unplaced		
Did not compete between 1969—1974
Miss Hibiscus Queen
1968	Natal (KwaZulu-Natal)	Monica Fairall	Unplaced		
1967	Transvaal (Gauteng)	Wendy Ballenden	Unplaced		
1966	Natal (KwaZulu-Natal)	Lynn Carol de Jager	Unplaced		
1965	Transvaal (Gauteng)	Veronika Edelgarda Hilda Prigge	Top 15		
1964	Transvaal (Gauteng)	Gail Robinson	Unplaced		
1963	Transvaal (Gauteng)	Ellen Liebenberg	Top 15		
1962	Transvaal (Gauteng)	Lynette Gamble	Unplaced		
1961	Transvaal (Gauteng)	Marina Christelis	Unplaced		
1960	Transvaal (Gauteng)	Nicky Caras	3rd Runner-up		
Did not compete between 1954—1959
Miss Golden Jubilee
1953	Cape Province (Western Cape)	Ingrid Rita Mills	Top 16		
1952	Transvaal (Gauteng)	Catherine Higgins	Top 10		

==== Miss World South Africa ====
On some occasions, the winner of Miss South Africa represents her country at the Miss World pageant. From 1970 to 1976, South Africa had one white and one black representative at Miss World. The white representative wore a sash that said "South Africa" and the black representative wore a sash that said "Africa South".

Year	Province	Miss World South Africa	Placement at Miss World	Special Awards
2022	Miss World 2021 was rescheduled to 16 March 2022 due to the COVID-19 pandemic outbreak in Puerto Rico, no edition started in 2022			
2021	Limpopo	Shudufhadzo Musida	Top 40	Miss World Talent (Top 27); Beauty with a Purpose
2020	Due to the impact of the COVID-19 pandemic, no competition held			
2019	Gauteng	Sasha-Lee Olivier	Top 40	
2018	Eastern Cape	Thulisa Keyi	Top 30	World Dress Designer Award; Miss World Top Model (4th Runner-up)
2017	Western Cape	Adè van Heerden	Top 10	Beauty with a Purpose (Top 5-joint winner)
2016	Mpumalanga	Ntandoyenkosi Kunene	Unplaced	Miss World Talent (Top 21)
2015	Gauteng	Liesl Laurie	Top 11	Miss World Africa
2014	Mpumalanga	Rolene Strauss	Miss World 2014	Miss World Africa
2013	North West	Marilyn Ramos	Unplaced	
2012	Western Cape	Remona Moodley	Unplaced	
2011	Gauteng	Bokang Montjane	Top 7	Miss World Africa
2010	Gauteng	Nicole Flint	Top 25	
2009	KwaZulu-Natal	Tatum Keshwar	2nd Runner-up	Miss World Africa
2008	Gauteng	Tansey Coetzee	Top 5	
2007	KwaZulu-Natal	Megan Coleman	Unplaced	
2006	Gauteng	Nokuthula "Thuli" Sithole	Unplaced	
2005	—	Dhiveja Sundrum	Top 15	
2004	Gauteng	Joan Ramagoshi	Unplaced	
2003	Gauteng	Cindy Nell	Unplaced	
2002	—	Claire Sabbagha	Unplaced	
2001	Western Cape	Jo-Ann Strauss	Top 10	
2000	Gauteng	Heather Joy Hamilton	Unplaced	
1999	Gauteng	Sonia Raciti	2nd Runner-up	Miss World Africa
1998	KwaZulu-Natal	Kerishnie Naiker	Top 5	Miss World Africa
1997	—	Jessica Motaung	2nd Runner-up	Miss World Africa
1996	—	Peggy-Sue Khumalo	Top 10	Miss World Africa
1995	—	Bernelee Daniell	Top 10	Miss World Africa
1994	Gauteng	Basetsana Makgalemele	1st Runner-up	Miss World Africa
1993	Transvaal (Gauteng)	Palesa Mofokeng	1st Runner-up	Miss World Africa
1992	Cape Province (Western Cape)	Amy Kleinhans	Top 5	Miss World Africa
1991	Transvaal (Gauteng)	Diana Tilden-Davis	2nd Runner-up	Miss World Africa
Did not compete between 1978—1990 as the country was barred from competing due to the country's practice of apartheid
1977	—	Vanessa Wannenburg	Unplaced	
Miss South Africa & Miss Africa South – Two Republic of South Africa Representatives at Miss World
1976	—	Lynn Massyn	Unplaced	
1976	—	Veronica Rozette Kuki Matsepe · Miss Africa South	Unplaced	
1975	—	Rhoda Rademeyer	Top 15	
1975	—	Lydia Gloria Johnstone · Miss Africa South	Unplaced	
1974	Transvaal (Gauteng)	Anneline Kriel	Miss World 1974: Appointed by 1st runner-up	Appointment: Became Miss World 1974 four days after the competition when the original winner withdrew
1974	—	Evelyn Peggy Williams · Miss Africa South	Top 15	
1973	—	Shelley Latham	4th Runner-up	
1973	—	Ellen Peters · Miss Africa South	Top 15	
1972	—	Stephanie Reinecke	Top 15	
1972	—	Cynthia Shange · Miss Africa South	Unplaced	
1971	Natal (KwaZulu-Natal)	Monica Fairall	Top 15	
1971	—	Gaily Ryan · Miss Africa South	Unplaced	
1970	—	Jillian Jessup	4th Runner-up	
1970	Cape Province (Western Cape)	Pearl Gladys Jansen · Miss Africa South	1st Runner-up	Miss Congeniality
Miss South Africa
1969	—	Linda Collett	Top 7	
1968	—	Mitzianna Stander	Unplaced	
1967	—	Disa Duivestein	Top 15	
1966	—	Johanna Maud Carter	Top 15	
1965	—	Carrol Davis	Unplaced	
1964	—	Vedra Karamitas	Unplaced	
1963	—	Louise Crous	Unplaced	
1962	—	Yvonne Ficker	3rd Runner-up	
1961	—	Yvonne Hulley	Top 15	
1960	—	Denise Muir	2nd Runner-up	
1959	—	Moya Meaker	Top 11	
1958	Natal (KwaZulu-Natal)	Penelope Coelen	Miss World 1958	
1957	—	Adele Kruger	2nd Runner-up	
1956	—	Norma Vorster	Unplaced	
Did not compete between 1951—1955

==== Miss Supranational South Africa ====
Miss South Africa Organisation held the Miss Supranational franchise in 2020 and send 1st runner-up, Thato Mosehle. From 2021 onwards, the winner of Miss South Africa will be competing in Miss Universe, Miss World and Miss Supranational when her schedule permits or won any of the international title.

Year	Province	Miss Supranational South Africa	Placement	Special Awards
2024	Gauteng	Bryoni Govender	Top 12 (6th place)	Miss Supranational Africa; Miss Friendship
2023	KwaZulu-Natal	Ayanda Gugulethu Thabethe	Top 24 (16th place)	Miss Congeniality; Supra Chat (Top 5)
2022	Kwa Zulu-Natal	Lalela Mswane	Miss Supranational 2022	
2021	North West	Thato Mosehle	2nd Runner-up	Supra Fan-vote (Top 10)
Miss Supranational South Africa
2020	Due to the impact of the COVID-19 pandemic, no competition held			
2019	Gauteng	Leyla van Greuning	Unplaced	
2018	Gauteng	Belinde Schreuder	Unplaced	
2017	Gauteng	Bianca Olivier	Unplaced	
2016	Gauteng	Talitha Bothma	Unplaced	
Did not compete between 2014—2015
2013	Western Cape	Natasha Pretorius	Unplaced	
2012	Western Cape	Michelle Gildenhuys	Top 20	Miss supranational Africa
2011	Eastern Cape	Dhesha Jeram	Top 10	Miss Supranational Africa; Miss South Africa 2011 Runner up.

== See also ==
- Miss Earth South Africa
- Miss Grand South Africa
- Mister South Africa
