= Miss South Africa 2021 =

63rd Miss South Africa pageant

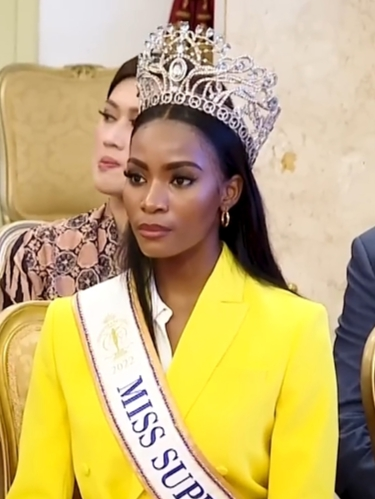
- Lalela Mswane, Miss South Africa 2021
- Date: 16 October 2021
- Presenters: Anele Mdoda; Nico Panagio; Catriona Gray; Zozibini Tunzi
- Entertainment: Ndlovu Youth Choir; Ntokozo Mbambo; Zakes Bantwini
- Venue: Grand Arena, GrandWest, Cape Town
- Broadcaster: M-Net; DStv; Mzansi Magic; YouTube
- Entrants: 10
- Placements: 5
- Winner: Lalela Mswane; KwaZulu-Natal

Miss South Africa 2021 was the 63rd edition of the Miss South Africa pageant, held at the Grand West Arena in Cape Town, South Africa, on 16 October 2021.

Shudufhadzo Musida crowned Lalela Mswane as her successor at the end of the event. She went on to represent South Africa at Miss Universe 2021 and Miss Supranational 2022. She finished as second-runner up at Miss Universe 2021 and was later crowned as Miss Supranational 2022.

== Results ==
=== Placements ===
Color keys

- The contestant Won in an International pageant.
- The contestant was a Runner-up in an International pageant.

Placement	Contestant	International placement
Miss South Africa 2021	KwaZulu-Natal – Lalela Mswane	2nd Runner-Up – Miss Universe 2021
Miss South Africa 2021	KwaZulu-Natal – Lalela Mswane	Winner – Miss Supranational 2022
Runners-Up	1st Eastern Cape – Zimi Mabunzi; 2nd Gauteng – Moratwe Masima	
Top 5	Western Cape – Bianca Bezuidenhout; Western Cape – Jeanni Mulder	

Order of Announcement

Top 10

1. Moratwe Masima
2. Cheneil Hartzenberg
3. Kgothatso Dithebe
4. Jeanni Mulder
5. Kaylan Matthews
6. Bianca Bezuidenhout
7. Lalela Mswane
8. Catherine Groenewald
9. Tiffany Francis
10. Zimi Mabunzi - Public Vote Winner

Top 5

1. Bianca Bezuidenhout
2. Jeanni Mulder
3. Lalela Mswane
4. Moratwe Masima
5. Zimi Mabunzi

Top 3

1. Lalela Mswane
2. Moratwe Masima
3. Zimi Mabunzi

== Delegates ==
The official Top 10 finalists were announced on 3 August 2021.

Name	Age	Province	Hometown	Placement
Bianca Bezuidenhout	22	Western Cape	Strand	Top 5
Catherine Groenewald	23	Western Cape	Constantia	
Cheneil Hartzenberg	24	Gauteng	Meredale	
Jeanni Mulder	24	Western Cape	Sea Point	Top 5
Kaylan Matthews	25	Eastern Cape	Port Elizabeth	
Kgothatso Dithebe	26	Gauteng	Centurion	
Lalela Mswane	24	KwaZulu-Natal	Richards Bay	Miss South Africa 2021
Moratwe Masima	24	Gauteng	Atholl	Top 3
Tiffany Francis	22	Gauteng	Mulbarton	
Zimi Mabunzi	26	Eastern Cape	King William's Town	Top 3

=== Top 30 ===
The Top 30 was announced on 6 July 2021. The following 20 delegates did not advance to the top ten.

Delegate	Age	Province	Hometown
Andile Mazibuko	23	KwaZulu-Natal	Ulundi
Ané Oosthuysen	23	Gauteng	Vanderbijlpark
Danielle Marais	24	Gauteng	Randburg
Eloïse van der Westhuizen	26	Western Cape	Panorama
Ferini Dayal	26	Gauteng	Kensington
Itumeleng Baloyi	23	Limpopo	Seshego
Jamie Cloete	23	Western Cape	Edgemead
Keashel van der Merwe	22	Gauteng	Roodepoort
Kgaketsang Mathobisa	22	Free State	Bloemfontein
Kgatlhiso Modisane	27	Gauteng	Pretoria
Licalle Isaacs	21	Western Cape	Plumstead
Lisanne Lazarus	25	KwaZulu-Natal	Amanzimtoti
Lehlogonolo Machaba	24	North West	Oskraal
Mawusive Sibutha	24	Eastern Cape	Tabankulu
Olin-Shae De La Cruz	27	Gauteng	Bryanston
Pearl Ntshehi	24	Gauteng	Mamelodi
Precious Mndalama	23	Gauteng	Soshanguve
Pumeza Zibi	24	Western Cape	Heideveld
Savannah De Almeida	23	KwaZulu-Natal	Hillcrest
Tshegofatso Molefe	26	Free State	Kestell

== Judges ==
=== Semifinals ===
The following four judges determined the 30 semifinalists.

- Melinda Bam – Miss South Africa 2011
- Tamaryn Green – Miss South Africa 2018
- Liesl Laurie – Miss South Africa 2015
- Bokang Montjane-Tshabalala – Miss South Africa 2010

=== Finals ===
- Shannon Esra – Actress
- Tamaryn Green – Miss South Africa 2018
- Basetsana Kumalo – Miss South Africa 1994
- Andrea Meza – Miss Universe 2020 from Mexico
- Mamokgethi Phakeng – Vice-Chancellor of the University of Cape Town
- Dineo Ranaka – Television and radio personality
- Pia Wurtzbach – Miss Universe 2015 from the Philippines
