= Miss South Africa 2015 =

- Date: March 22, 2015
- Presenters: Proverb
- Entertainment: Gangs of Ballet; Beatenberg and Sterling EQ
- Venue: Sun City Superbowl, Rustenburg, South Africa
- Broadcaster: M-Net and Mzansi Magic
- Entrants: 12
- Placements: 5
- Winner: Liesl Laurie; Johannesburg

Miss South Africa 2015 was the 57th edition of the Miss South Africa pageant, held at the Sun City Superbowl in Rustenburg, on March 29, 2015.

Zipozakhe Zokufa crowned Liesl Laurie of Johannesburg as her successor at the end of the event. Miss World 2014 Rolene Strauss attended the event, along with two other South Africans to have won Miss World, Penelope Coelen, Miss World 1958 and Anneline Kriel, Miss World 1974.

== Results ==
Color keys

- The contestant Won in an International pageant.
- The contestant was a Runner-up in an International pageant.
- The contestant was a Semi-Finalist in an International pageant.
- Unplaced

Final Results	Candidate	International Placement
Miss South Africa 2015	Gauteng − Liesl Laurie	Top 10
Miss World South Africa 2015	Gauteng − Liesl Laurie	Top 10
1st Princess	Gauteng − Refilwe Mthimunye	Top 15
Miss Universe South Africa 2015	Gauteng − Refilwe Mthimunye	Top 15
2nd Princess	Gauteng − Ntsiki Mkhize	
Top 5	Western Cape − Nicole Lamberts; KwaZulu Natal − Sihle Makhanya	

== Top 12 ==
Contestant	Age	Province	Hometown
Busi Mahlangu	23	Mpumalanga	KwaNdebele
Chanelle Sardinha	23	Gauteng	Johannesburg
Danelle De Wet	22	Western Cape	Kuils River
Gugulethu Banda	21	Gauteng	Spruitview
Kim Wentzel	24	Gauteng	Johannesburg
Liesl Laurie	23	Gauteng	Johannesburg
Nicole Lamberts	23	Western Cape	Stellenbosch
Ntsiki Mkihze	23	Gauteng	Midvaal
Refilwe Mthimunye	22	Gauteng	Bronkhorstspruit
Shane Naidoo	22	Gauteng	Benoni
Sihle Makhanya	23	KwaZulu Natal	Empangeni
Taryn Morris	25	Western Cape	Cape Town

== Judges ==
- Actress and TV personality Sophie Ndaba.
- Poet and writer, Kojo Baffoe.
- Miss World in 1974, Anneline Kriel (Bacon)
- Bloemfontein designer, Casper Bosman.
