= Jackie Phamotse =

South African author,philanthropist and businesswoman

- Born: Katleho Jaqueline Phamotse; 3 March 1989 (age 37)
- Education: University of South Africa (BA in Communication)
- Occupations: Writer; Businesswoman; Social Activist
- Years active: 2017–present
- Notable work: Shattered Innocence (2014), BARE: The Blesser’s Game (2017), BARE II: The Cradle of The Hockey Club (2018), I Tweet what I Like: So...sue Me! (2019), BARE III: Ego (2020), Liwa...always on Their Minds: Women who Kill for "Kamasutra (2021), BARE IV: Mercy (2022), The Tea Merchant (2024), The Advocate (2025)

Katleho Jaqueline "Jackie" Phamotse (born 3 March 1989) is a South African author, businesswoman, and social activist.

== Literary career ==
She published her debut novel Shattered Innocence in 2014 which focused on sugar dating.

=== The BARE Series ===
Phamotse published her autobiographical novel BARE: The Blesser's Game in 2017, now part of her best selling BARE series, continuing the theme of sugar dating from her first work and won the 2018 African Icon Literary Award. Her follow-up work BARE II: The Cradle of The Hockey Club tells the story of the blessers and blessees and was published in 2018 and won the SA Book Award for Best Adult Fiction in 2020. Her third title BARE III: Ego focused on human trafficking, organ sales, and other social ills. The fourth book BARE IV: Mercy focused on the underworld and the role politicians played in human trafficking and earned her a nomination in the Best Adult Fiction category at the 2023 SA Book Awards.

She released I Tweet what I Like: So...sue Me! in 2019 following a defamation case being laid on her by Romeo and Basetsana Kumalo after her 2018 Twitter post about an alleged gay sex tape. The Khumalo's took the stand to testify against Phamotse in 2024 and she was later found guilty on four charges including defamation, crimen injuria and violating a protection order. She was placed on two years house arrest and fined with unpaid community service.

She signed to Penguin Random House after self publishing her previous books in 2024 and released her first book under the publication titled The Tea Merchant. In 2025 she released The Advocate.

== Personal life ==
Phamotse was born to Irene Ramonotsi and Thabo Phamotse on 3 March 1989. She holds a Bachelor of Arts degree in Communication from the University of South Africa.

== Television ==
Phamotse featured on Showmax's five-part documentary Slay Queens.

== Bibliography ==
Series	Year	Title	Ref
	2014	Shattered Innocence	
BARE Series	2017	BARE: The Blesser's Game	
BARE Series	2018	BARE II: The Cradle of The Hockey Club	
BARE Series	2020	BARE III: Ego	
BARE Series	2022	BARE IV: Mercy	
	2019	I Tweet what I Like: So...sue Me!	
	2021	Liwa...always on Their Minds: Women who Kill for "Kamasutra	
	2024	The Tea Merchant	
	2025	The Advocate	
