= Montjane =

Montjane is a South African surname. Notable people with the surname include:

- Bokang Montjane (born 1986), South African model and beauty pageant titleholder
- Kgothatso Montjane (born 1986), South African wheelchair tennis player
