= Jacqui Mofokeng =

South African beauty queen, Miss South Africa 1993

- Born: Palesa Jacqueline Mofokeng; Soweto, Gauteng, South Africa
- Education: University of the Witwatersrand
- Beauty pageant titleholder
- Hair color: Black
- Eye colour: Brown
- Major competitions: Miss South Africa 1993; (winner): Miss World 1993; (1st princess)

Palesa Jacqueline Mofokeng (born 1971) is a South African model and beauty pageant titleholder who was crowned Miss South Africa 1993. She was the first black woman to be crowned Miss South Africa.

Mofokeng won first princess at the Miss World 1993 pageant.

== Pageantry ==
=== Miss South Africa ===
She was crowned the winner by predecessor Amy Kleinhans on November 27, 1993 at Sun City Entertainment Centre beating runner-up Corinne Durrheim and second runner-up Marelize Steyn to the crown.

Her win attracted a lot of criticism from white conservatives.

Mofokeng crowned her successor, Basetsana Makgalemele, on 19 November 1994.

=== Miss World ===
Mofokeng represented South Africa at the Miss World 1993 pageant. She was first runners-up to Lisa Rene Shanti Hanna of Jamaica.

== Post Miss South Africa ==
She was invited by Nelson Mandela to serve on the board of trustees for the Nelson Mandela Children’s Fund. She also founded an executive placement company called Jay-Emm Connections and worked as a television presenter for SABC 3.

== Personal life ==
Born in Soweto in 1972, Mofokeng studied a Bachelor of Commerce degree at the University of the Witwatersrand. In 2003 she moved to New Jersey, USA where she currently lives with her husband and two children.
