= Tansey Coetzee =

South African beauty pageant titleholder

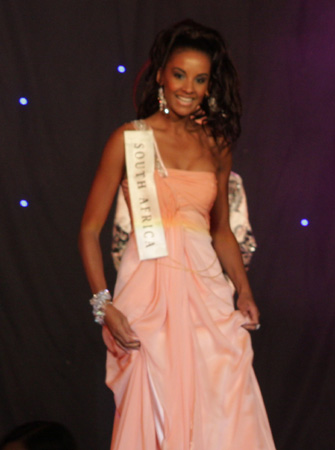
- Born: Tansey Coetzee; 8 October 1984 (age 42); Johannesburg, South Africa
- Height: 1.74 m (5 ft 9 in)
- Beauty pageant titleholder
- Title: Miss South Africa 2007
- Major competitions: Miss South Africa 2007 (Winner); Miss Universe 2008 (Top 15); Miss World 2008 (Top 5)

Tansey Coetzee (born 8 October 1984) is a South African model and beauty pageant titleholder who was crowned Miss South Africa 2007, and later competed as the host delegate of the Miss World 2008 pageant held in Johannesburg, South Africa, where she finished as a Top 5 finalist. She also previously represented South Africa in Miss Universe 2008 in Nha Trang, Vietnam, where she placed among the Top 15 semifinalists.

She is the first coloured Miss South Africa winner in history to achieve high placements at both Miss World and Miss Universe. Only 4 Miss South Africa winners have ever achieved this. She attended Allen Glen High School in Roodepoort, west of Johannesburg.

== Personal life ==
Tansey Coetzee is married to Kolapo Sodeinde. They have a daughter.

Preceded by Megan Coleman	Miss South Africa; 2008	Succeeded by Tatum Keshwar
