= Kerishnie Naiker =

South African beauty pageant titleholder

- Born: Kerishnie Naiker; Durban, South Africa
- Beauty pageant titleholder
- Title: Miss South Africa 1997
- Hair color: Black
- Major competitions: Miss South Africa 1997 (Winner); Miss World 1998 (Top 5); Miss Universe 1998 (Top 10)

Kerishnie Naiker is a South African pharmacist and beauty pageant titleholder who was crowned Miss South Africa 1997. Naiker placed Top 5 at Miss World 1998 and later that year, she went on Miss Universe 1998 and placed among the Top 10 finalists.

== Early life ==
Kerishnie Naiker grew up in Reservoir Hills, Durban with her parents Amra and Joey, a self-employed businessman and two siblings. She attained an honours degree in pharmacy in 1995 and practiced as a senior pharmacist in hospital and retail pharmacy. During her final year, her father died from a heart attack. She was studying towards her masters in pharmacy practice researching "The Social and Behavioural Factors Affecting Tuberculosis in South Africa" in 1997, when she became Miss South Africa.

== Miss South Africa 1997 ==
Kerishnie Naiker was crowned as Miss South Africa 1997. By entering the election, she intended to bring public attention to the large population of South Africans of Indian ancestry, who are an important part of South Africa's history, identity, culture and population, and to raise awareness on tuberculosis. Upon winning the competition, she became the first South African of Indian descent elected Miss South Africa. She became the eventual winner of the title, gaining the right to represent South Africa in Miss Universe 1998, and Miss World 1998.

Preceded by Peggy-Sue Khumalo	Miss South Africa; 1997	Succeeded by Sonia Raciti-Oshry
