= Megan Coleman =

South African beauty queen

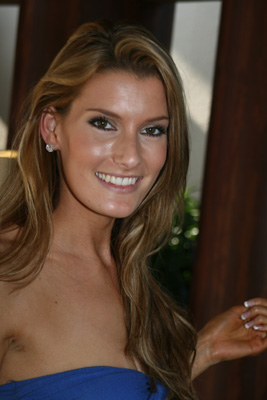
- Megan during Miss World 2007
- Born: Megan Kate Coleman; May 28, 1985 (age 41); Hillcrest, Natal Province, South Africa
- Beauty pageant titleholder
- Title: Miss South Africa 2006 (Winner); Miss Universe 2007 (Unplaced); Miss World 2007 (Unplaced)

Megan Kate Coleman is a South African businesswoman and beauty pageant titleholder who represented South Africa at Miss Universe 2007 in Mexico and Miss World 2007 in China. She was crowned Miss South Africa 2006.

== Early life ==
She went to HHS and she has a Bachelor of Social Science degree (in Media, Communications & Marketing), and runs an image consulting business (Image Insured) as well as has her own clothing range (Seasons) in Hillcrest.

Preceded by Claudia Henkel	Miss South Africa; 2006	Succeeded by Tansey Coetzee
