= Alena Šeredová =

Czech model and actress (born 1978)

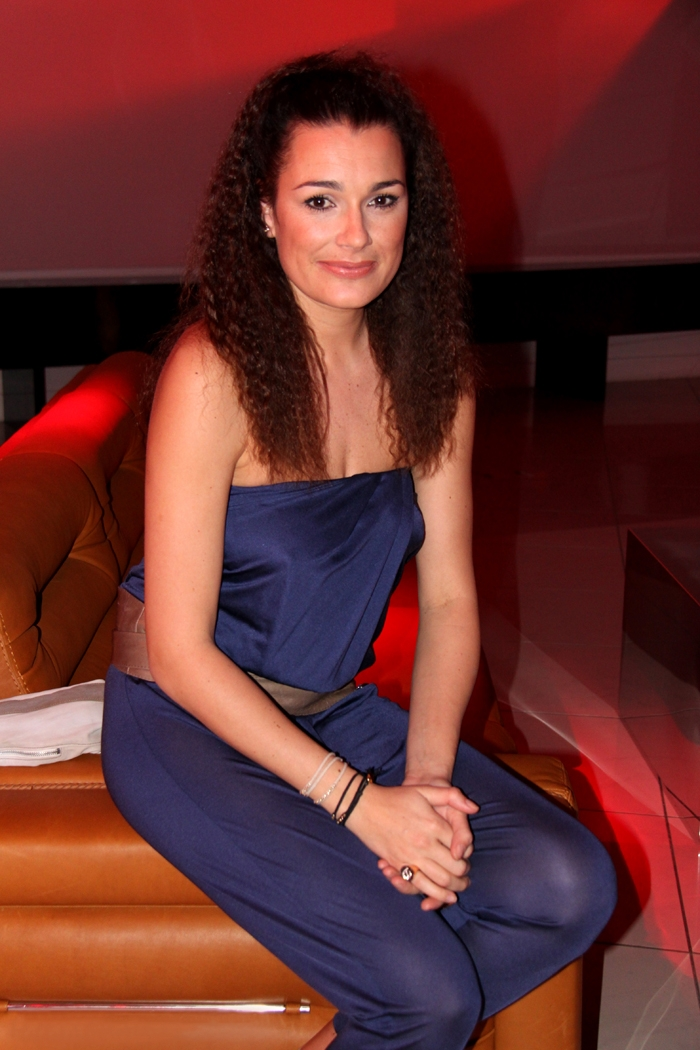
- Born: 21 March 1978 (age 48); Prague, Czechoslovakia
- Occupations: Model; actress
- Height: 1.81 m (5 ft 11 in)
- Spouses: Gianluigi Buffon (m. 2011; div. 2014); Alessandro Nasi (m. 2023)
- Children: 3
- Beauty pageant titleholder
- Title: Miss Czech Republic 1998
- Hair color: Dark brown (originally black)
- Eye color: Dark brown
- Major competitions: Miss Czech Republic 1998 (Winner); Miss World 1998 (Top 5)
- Website: www.alenaseredova.it

Alena Šeredová (Czech pronunciation: [ˈalɛna ˈʃɛrɛdovaː]; born 21 March 1978) is a Czech model, actress, and beauty pageant titleholder who was crowned Miss Czech Republic 1998 and represented her country at Miss World 1998 where she placed Top 5.

== Career ==
Šeredová was born in Prague. Her modeling career began at the age of 15. Five years later, she was first runner-up for Miss Czech Republic 1998 and her country's representative at Miss World 1998 where she tied for fourth in the finals. She started her career as a model in 2002. She was chosen by the Italian comedian Giorgio Panariello to co-host his own prime-time TV show Torno Sabato. She has been featured on the covers of several magazines including Penthouse Europe, Playboy Europe, Spy, Extreme and Quo. In 2005, she was chosen to star in Max Calendar.

== Personal life ==
Šeredová was in a relationship with Italian goalkeeper Gianluigi Buffon. They have two sons, Louis Buffon, who was born on 28 December 2007, and David Lee who was born on 1 November 2009. They married in June 2011, and separated in May 2014.

Alena co-owns the Italian clothing-line (Baci e Abbracci) together with Buffon's former national teammate, Christian Vieri.

Following her separation with Buffon, Šeredová has been in a relationship with Italian businessman Alessandro Nasi. They have a daughter together who was born in 2020. They married on 17 July 2023.

She has a sister named Eliška, who is also a model.

== Filmography ==
- Ho visto le stelle (I Have Seen the Stars) (2003; Viděl jsem hvězdy); comedy, running time: 91 minutes,
  director: Vincenzo Salemme
- Christmas in Love (2004; Zamilované Vánoce); comedy, running time: 118 minutes,
  director: Neri Parenti
