= Nicole Flint =

South African model, beauty pageant titleholder

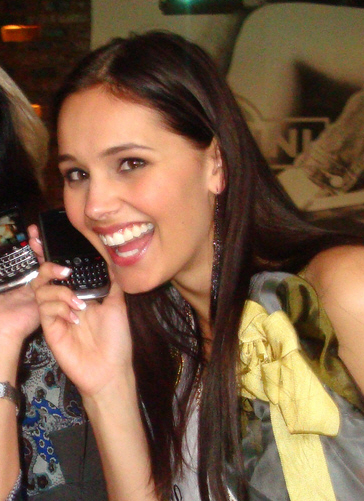
- Flint in 2010
- Born: Nicole Flint; 15 May 1988 (age 38); Pretoria, South Africa
- Height: 1.68 m (5 ft 6 in)
- Beauty pageant titleholder
- Title: Miss South Africa 2009
- Hair color: Brown
- Eye color: Brown
- Major competitions: Miss South Africa 2009 (Winner); Miss Universe 2010 (Top 10); Miss World 2010 (Top 25)

Nicole Flint (born 15 May 1988) is a South African tv host, model, public relations and beauty pageant titleholder who was crowned Miss South Africa 2009.

== Pageantry ==
Flint represented South Africa at the Miss Universe 2010 pageant, held on 23 August 2010, in Las Vegas, Nevada, where she placed in the Top 10. She subsequently placed in the Top 25 at Miss World 2010, held on 30 October 2010, in Sanya, China.

Awards and achievements
| Preceded by Tatum Keshwar | Miss South Africa; 2009 | Succeeded by Bokang Montjane |
