= Miss South Africa 2014 =

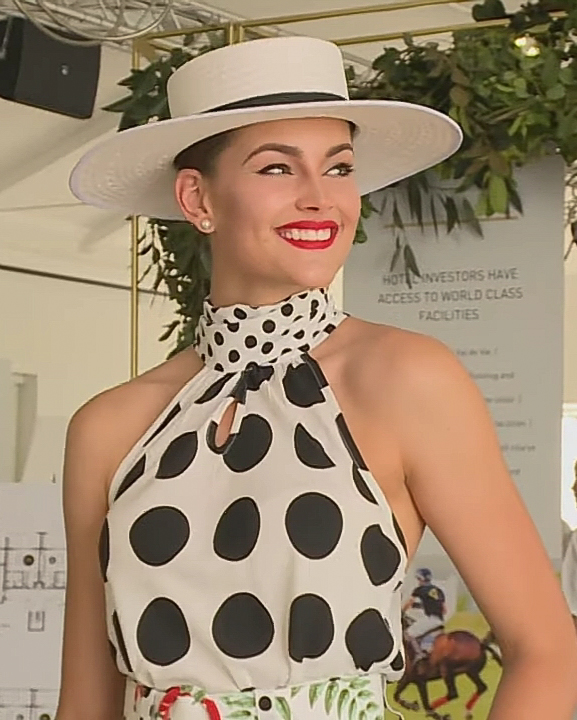
- Rolene Strauss, Miss South Africa 2014
- Date: March 16, 2014
- Presenters: Elana Afrika-Bredenkamp
- Entertainment: Mi Casa, Bucie and Matthew Mole
- Venue: Sun City Superbowl, Rustenburg, South Africa
- Broadcaster: DStv
- Entrants: 12
- Placements: 5
- Winner: Rolene Strauss; Volksrust
- Congeniality: Abigail de Jager

Miss South Africa 2014 was the 56th edition of the Miss South Africa pageant, held at the Sun City Superbowl in Rustenburg, on March 30, 2014.

The pageant was won by Rolene Strauss who, in the December of the same year, was also crowned Miss World. Strauss' winning of the Miss World title made her ineligible for Miss Universe; this led to Miss South Africa 2014 first runner up Ziphozakhe Zokufa being crowned Miss South Africa, to allow Zokufa to compete for the Miss Universe 2014 crown.

== Results ==
Color keys

- The contestant Won in an International pageant.
- The contestant was a Runner-up in an International pageant.
- The contestant was a Semi-Finalist in an International pageant.
- Unplaced

Final Results	Candidate	International Placement
Miss South Africa 2014	Mpumalanga − Rolene Strauss	Miss World 2014
Miss World South Africa 2014	Mpumalanga − Rolene Strauss	Miss World 2014
1st Princess	Eastern Cape − Ziphozakhe Zokufa	Unplaced
Miss Universe South Africa 2014	Eastern Cape − Ziphozakhe Zokufa	Unplaced
2nd Princess	Limpopo − Matlala Mokoko	
Top 5	Western Cape − Anzel Stofberg; Gauteng − Tidimalo Sehlako	

== Contestants ==
Contestant	Age	Height	Province	Hometown
Abigail de Jager	19	181 cm (5 ft 11 1/2 in)	Mpumalanga	Nelspruit
Anzel Stofberg	22	175 cm (5 ft 9 in)	Western Cape	Stellenbosch
Caylene Marais	23	173 cm (5 ft 8 in)	Gauteng	Roodepoort
Dipalesa Mbola	22	174 cm (5 ft 8 1/2 in)	Free State	Bloemfontein
Jade Hübner	21	170 cm (5 ft 7 in)	Western Cape	Cape Town
Julia Petersen	22	176 cm (5 ft 9 1/2 in)	KwaZulu Natal	Durban
Matlala Mokoko	23	182 cm (5 ft 11 1/2 in)	Limpopo	Marogwe
Mishka Patel	21	182 cm (5 ft 11 1/2 in)	Western Cape	Cape Town
Rolene Strauss	22	177 cm (5 ft 9 1/2 in)	Mpumalanga	Volksrust
Tidimalo Sehlako	22	165 cm (5 ft 5 in)	Gauteng	Vereeniging
Tshegofatso Monggae	22	181 cm (5 ft 11 1/2 in)	Gauteng	Roodepoort
Ziphozakhe Zokufa	22	172 cm (5 ft 7 1/2 in)	Eastern Cape	Port Elizabeth

== Special prizes ==
Prize	Contestant
Miss Congeniality	Abigail de Jager

== Judges ==
Member
Anele Mdoda	Radio and TV personality
Bonang Matheba	Radio and TV personality
Kojo Baffoe	Editor of Destiny Man
Amy Kleinhans	Miss South Africa 1992
Pnina Fenster	Editor-in-Chief of Glamour Magazine

== Music and entertainment ==
- Bucie
- Mi Casa
- Matthew Mole

== Crossovers ==
Contestants who previously competed or will be competing at international beauty pageants:

Miss World

- 2014: Mpumalanga – Rolene Strauss (Winner)
  - (London, United Kingdom)

Miss Universe

- 2014: Eastern Cape – Ziphozakhe Zokufa (Unplaced)
  - (Miami, United States)

Miss Global Beauty Queen

- 2011: Gauteng – Caylene Marais (4th Runner-Up)
  - (Seoul, South Korea)
