= Miss South Africa 2009 =

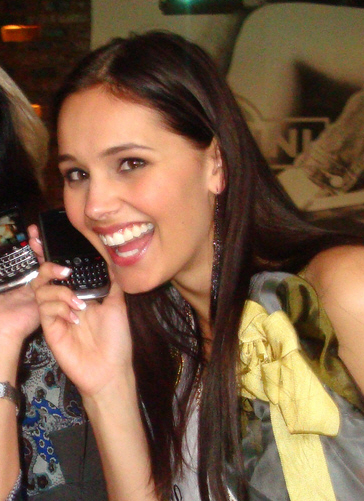
- Nicole Flint, Miss South Africa 2009
- Date: 13 December 2009
- Entertainment: DJ Cleo, Coda, Chris Chameleon, Jessie Clegg and Loyiso
- Venue: Sun City Superbowl, Rustenburg, South Africa
- Broadcaster: SABC
- Entrants: 12
- Winner: Nicole Flint; Pretoria

Miss South Africa 2009 was held on 13 December 2009 in Sun City, South Africa. The winner represented South Africa at Miss Universe 2010 and Miss World 2010. Twelve contestants competed for the crown. Nicole Flint was crowned by the outgoing titleholder, Tatum Keshwar from Durban.

== Results ==
Color keys

- The contestant Won in an International pageant.
- The contestant was a Runner-up in an International pageant.
- The contestant was a Semi-Finalist in an International pageant.
- Unplaced

Final Results	Candidate	International Placement
Miss South Africa 2009	Pretoria − Nicole Flint	Top 10 − Miss Universe 2010; Top 25 − Miss World 2010
Miss Universe South Africa 2010	Pretoria − Nicole Flint	Top 10 − Miss Universe 2010; Top 25 − Miss World 2010
Miss World South Africa 2010	Pretoria − Nicole Flint	Top 10 − Miss Universe 2010; Top 25 − Miss World 2010
1st Princess	Gauteng − Matapa Maila	
2nd Princess	Western Cape − Lisa Maree Van Zyl	
Top 5	Gauteng − Mahlatse Mkhawana	
Top 5	Free State − Joanne Cronje	

== Contestants ==
Contestant	Age	Height (Ft)	Height (Cm)	Hometown
Evette Wessels	22	5'9"	175	Pretoria
Lisa Maree Van Zyl	23	5'10"	178	Cape Town
Karlien Seegers	25	5'11"	182	Cape Town
Matapa Maila	24	5'6"	169	Johannesburg
Carol Makhathini	24	5'7"	172	Durban
Joanne Cronje	23	5'10"	179	Bloemfontein
Taki Simeli	20	5'10"	177	Johannesburg
Melody Zulu	23	6'0"	183	Johannesburg
Lebogang Keagile	19	5'11"	181	Johannesburg
Mahlatse Mkhawana	20	5'9"	176	Johannesburg
Nicole Flint	21	5'8"	174	Pretoria
Michelle Bruno	24	5'10"	180	Durban

== Crossover ==
First runner-up Matapa Maila competed in Miss Earth 2008 and did not place.
