= Amy Kleinhans =

South African beauty queen (born 1968)

- Born: Amy Kleinhans
- Other name: Amy Kleinhans-Curd
- Height: 1.73 m (5 ft 8 in)
- Beauty pageant titleholder
- Title: Miss South Africa 1992
- Hair color: Black
- Eye color: Brown
- Major competitions: Miss South Africa 1991 (1st runner-up); Miss South Africa 1992 (Winner); Miss World 1992 (Top 5) (Miss World Africa)

Amy Kleinhans-Curd (born 1968) is a South African model and beauty pageant titleholder who was crowned Miss South Africa 1992, the first person of colour to win in the history of South Africa. She placed Top 5 to Miss World as Miss World Africa on 12 December 1992. Kleinhans also appears on the Afrikaans language South African reality show Die Real Housewives van die Wynlande.

== Miss South Africa ==
As a 23-year-old Cape Coloured woman, she competed for the first time in 1991 and placed second. She competed the following year and defeated 11 other contestants for the title of Miss South Africa 1992, the first a woman of colour was crowned in the history of Miss South Africa.

Her first runner-up was a black woman Augustine Masilela of Soweto, who would be a Top 10 semifinalist at Miss Universe 1995.

Kleinhans would crown her successor a year later, Palesa Jacqui Mofokeng, who would be the first black Miss South Africa ever and the second person of colour to capture the crown.

In 2014, she was guest judge in the final Miss South Africa 2014 beauty pageant, venue in the Sun City Superbowl, Rustenburg, South Africa. Transmitted by television network DStv.

== Miss World 1992 ==
As the official representative of her country to the 1992 Miss World pageant held in Sun City, South Africa on 12 December, she became Miss World Africa and 4th runner-up to eventual winner Julia Kourotchkina of Russia.

During the pageant participants paraded with the flag of their country. Amy refused to walk with the flag of then apartheid South Africa. She chose instead to walk with a white flag, symbolising peace. After the event she received a phone call from Nelson Mandela thanking her for making that decision.

The dress she wore while participating in the pageant, a white and gold Stefania Morland design with elaborate ostrich feather details, is on exhibition at the CP Nel Museum in Oudtshoorn.

== Personal life ==
Kleinhans is married to New Zealand businessman Leighton Curd, and is a mother of four children.

Awards and achievements
Preceded by (South Africa) Diana Tilden-Davis	Miss World Africa; 1992	Succeeded by (South Africa) Palesa Mofokeng
Preceded by Diana Tilden-Davis	Miss South Africa; 1992	Succeeded by Palesa Mofokeng
