= Miss South Africa 2010 =

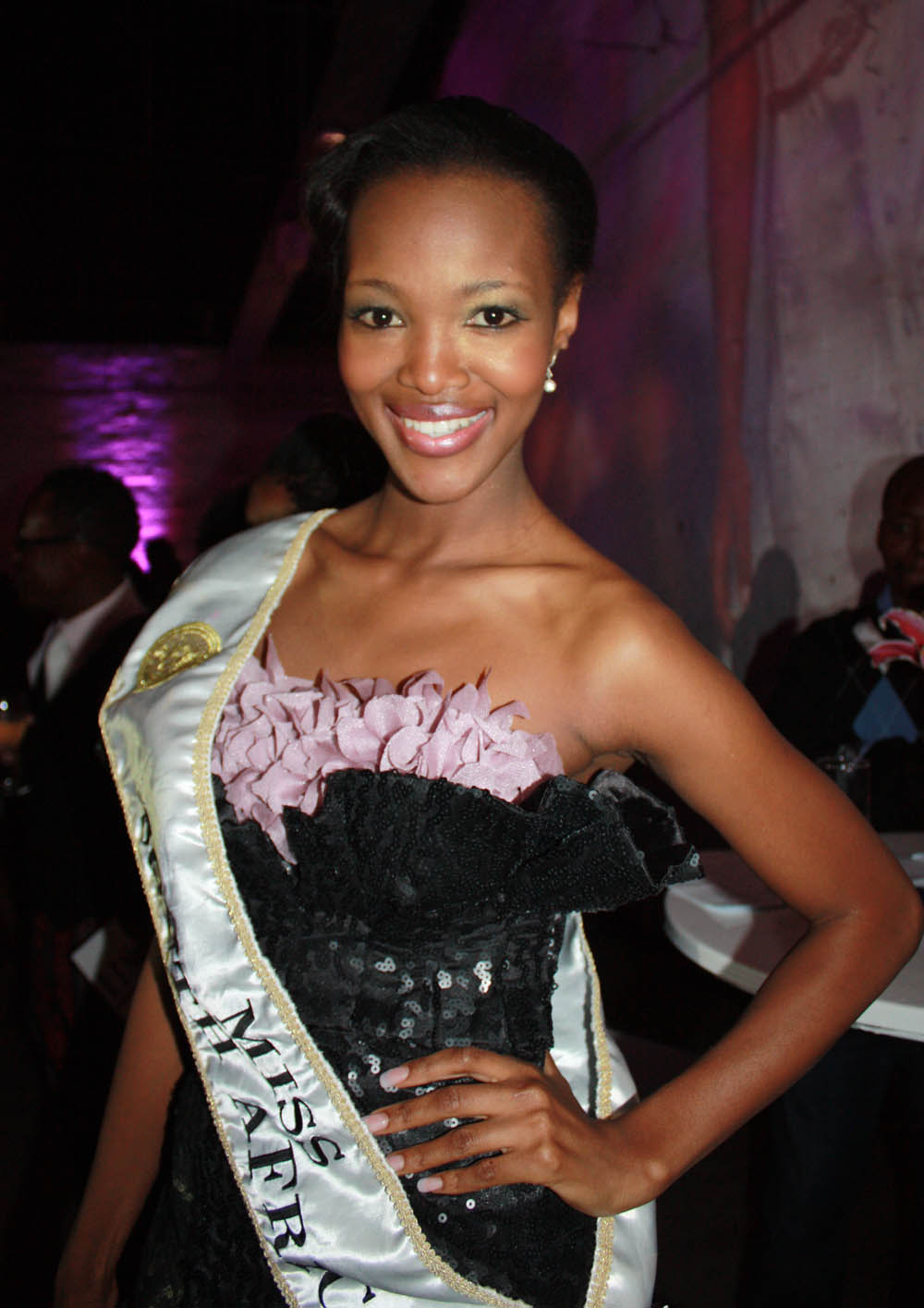
- Bokang Montjane, Miss South Africa 2010
- Date: January 23, 2011
- Presenters: Michelle McLean and ProVerb
- Entertainment: The Bala Brothers
- Venue: Sun City Superbowl, Rustenburg, South Africa
- Broadcaster: Mzansi Magic
- Entrants: 12
- Placements: 5
- Winner: Bokang Montjane; Johannesburg

Miss South Africa 2010 was held on 12 December 2010 in Sun City, South Africa. The winner will represent South Africa at Miss Universe 2011 and Miss World 2011. Twelve contestants competed for the crown. Bokang Montjane was crowned Miss South Africa 2010 by the outgoing title holder Nicole Flint from Pretoria.

== Winner and runners-up ==
Color keys

- The contestant won in an international pageant.
- The contestant was a runner-up in an international pageant.
- The contestant was a semi-finalist in an international pageant.
- Unplaced

Final Results	Candidate	International Placement
Miss South Africa 2010	Gauteng − Bokang Montjane	Unplaced − Miss Universe 2011; Top 7 − Miss World 2011
Miss Universe South Africa 2011	Gauteng − Bokang Montjane	Unplaced − Miss Universe 2011; Top 7 − Miss World 2011
Miss World South Africa 2011	Gauteng − Bokang Montjane	Unplaced − Miss Universe 2011; Top 7 − Miss World 2011
1st Princess	Western Cape − Dhesha Jeram	Top 10
Miss Supranational South Africa 2011	Western Cape − Dhesha Jeram	Top 10
2nd Princess	Gauteng − Bianca Coutinho	
Top 5	Western Cape − Careen Truter; Gauteng − Natasha Kashimoto	

== Top 12 ==
Contestant	Age	Province	Hometown
Anja van Zyl	22	Gauteng	Pretoria
Bianca Coutinho	22	Gauteng	Johannesburg
Bokang Montjane	24	Gauteng	Johannesburg
Careen Truter	19	Western Cape	Cape Town
Chanal Grantham	21	KwaZulu-Natal	Durban
Danicka Riehl	18	Gauteng	Pretoria
Dhesha Jeram	23	Western Cape	Cape Town
Dorah Mtetwa	24	Gauteng	Soweto
Kiasha Naidoo	22	Gauteng	Johannesburg
Malesotse Makgalemele	23	Gauteng	Johannesburg
Natasha Kashimoto	19	Gauteng	Ekurhuleni
Sandhya Naidoo	21	Western Cape	Cape Town

== Crossovers ==
Contestants who previously competed or will be competing at international beauty pageants:

Miss World

- 2011: Gauteng – Bokang Montjane (Top 7)
  - (London, United Kingdom)

Miss Universe

- 2011: Gauteng – Bokang Montjane (Unplaced)
  - (São Paulo, Brazil)

Miss Earth

- 2007: Gauteng – Bokang Montjane (Top 16)
  - (Quezon City, Philippines)
- 2009: KwaZulu-Natal – Chanel Grantham (Top 16)
  - (Boracay, Philippines)

Miss International

- 2009: Gauteng – Bokang Montjane (Unplaced)
  - (Chengdu, China)
- 2011: Gauteng – Natasha Kashimoto (Unplaced)
  - (Chengdu, China)

Miss Supranational

- 2011: Western Cape – Dhesha Jeram (Top 20)
  - (Płock, Poland)
