= Johanna Makgalemele =

South African businesswoman and philanthropist

- Born: Soweto, Gauteng, South Africa
- Other name: Johanna Mukoki
- Education: Rhodes University (BCom, Accounting and Economics)
- Occupations: Businesswoman, motivational speaker, philanthropist
- Years active: 1996–present
- Employer: Travel with Flair
- Known for: Co-founder of Travel with Flair, first African board member of the Association of Corporate Travel Executives, multiple business awards
- Title: Group CEO of Travel with Flair
- Spouse: Alan Mukoki (m. 2011, divorced)
- Relatives: Basetsana Kumalo (sister)

Johanna Makgalemele (previously known as Johanna Mukoki) is a South African entrepreneur, motivational speaker, and philanthropist. She is the co-founder of Travel with Flair, a South African travel management company.

== Early life and education ==
Johanna Makgalemele was born in Soweto, South Africa, during the apartheid era. She is the elder sister of Basetsana Kumalo, a South African media personality and former Miss South Africa. Makgalemele attended Rhodes University, where she earned a BCOM degree, major in Accounting and Economics.

== Awards ==
In 2008, Makgalemele was named South Africa's Most Influential Woman in Business and Government in the Tourism Sector by the CEO Magazine. In 2012, she was named Emerging South African Entrepreneur of the Year at the Ernst & Young World Entrepreneur Awards. In 2017, she received the Exceptional Commitment Award from the ASATA Diners Club Awards. Makgalemele was also the winner of the 2017 BWASA Businesswoman of the Year under the entrepreneur category.

== Personal life ==
Makgalemele married South African businessman Alan Mukoki in 2011. The couple divorced in 2020.
