= Eileen Sheridan (model) =

British model (1936–2018)

Eileen Elizabeth Sheridan (1936–2018) was a British beauty pageant contestant who was also known for her association with the London underworld 'firm' headed by the Kray twins, notably attending the funeral of their elder brother, Charlie, in 2000, as well as the funerals of Ronnie and Reggie Kray. Sheridan was a character witness at Charlie Kray's drug trial, and provided the famous "Legend" wreath at Reggie Kray's funeral. Sheridan became friends with the Krays after becoming the first winner of the Miss United Kingdom title in 1958. Her future husband persuaded her to enter the new Miss UK competition in Blackpool. Later, she was placed in the final six of the Miss World contest, held at the Lyceum Ballroom in London.

== Early career ==
Born in 1936 in Surrey, as Eileen Elizabeth Wheeler, the teenage Eileen was interested in athletics and horse riding. Upon leaving school, she was spotted working in a department store by a photographer who persuaded her to sign up with the Cherry Marshall model agency in Mayfair. Sheridan married a former bookmaker two years after winning her Miss UK title, becoming Eileen Sheridan-Price, after completing the double by winning Miss Great Britain in 1960 at Morecambe. She enjoyed running, and was a regular at many athletic events in the south east.

== Life after the pageant ==
Sheridan spent ten years performing in old-time musicals as a male impersonator. She met her husband, Ken Price, when she was 14, and was married to him until his death in 2005.

She died on 31 August 2018, and is buried with her husband in Molesey Cemetery, Surrey.

Preceded by none	Miss United Kingdom; 1958	Succeeded by Anne Thelwell
