= Marilyn Ramos =

South African model and beauty pageant titleholder

- Born: Marilyn Ramos; 16 February 1991 (age 35); Klerksdorp, South Africa
- Height: 1.74 m (5 ft 8 1/2 in)
- Beauty pageant titleholder
- Title: Miss South Africa 2012
- Hair color: Brown
- Eye color: Brown
- Major competitions: Miss South Africa 2012 (Winner); Miss Universe 2013 (Unplaced); Miss World 2013 (Unplaced)

Marilyn Ramos (born 16 February 1991) is a South African designer, model and beauty pageant titleholder who was crowned Miss South Africa 2012, becoming the official representative of her country to Miss Universe 2013 and Miss World 2013. Ramos represented South Africa at Miss World 2013 and Miss Universe 2013, failing to place in both competitions. She entered the pageant twice before she emerged the winner. She also held the title for the longest in SA pageant history- 16 months until she has crowned Rolene Strauss on 30 March 2014 as her successor.

== Early life ==
Klerksdorp's home town is Klerksdorp.

== Miss South Africa 2012 ==
In light of the fact that the outgoing Miss South Africa was in attendance at the Miss Universe pageant where she had placed in the top 10. Marilyn Ramos from Klerksdorp has been crowned Miss South Africa 2012 by Remona Moodley (The First Runner-up Miss South Africa 2011) at the Sun City Super Bowl on Sunday night, 9 December 2012. However, Melinda Bam did pay homage to her country and the title that she held in the form of a video montage that was aired on the night of the finale.

== Beyond 2012 ==
In 2013 a now-defunct major media publication (Heat magazine) accused her of being ‘the worst Miss SA ever'. However, she responded to it, by indicating that: "There was no PR in place for Miss SA 2012. The events, charities and other initiatives I had done went unseen to the public. No one was sending out Press Releases of my doings, creating the warped perception that I wasn't fulfilling my duties as Miss SA. A PR team was only put in place when the Miss SA 2014 search started, and clearly focused on the 2014 pageant. The events I attended were a combination of what the Miss SA Offices arranged and invitations I received in my own personal capacity. But despite all this I tirelessly focused all my energy on the various charities I was responsible for. Contrary to popular belief, as Miss South Africa I did not even have a clothing sponsor, but was always expected to look my best and that of a Miss South Africa. This dilemma reached a critical climax when it came to the Miss World (hosted in Bali) and Miss Universe (hosted in Moscow) pageants. With minimal support once again, it came down to my parents and family drives (to raise money) to pay for almost everything, including 90 outfits (gowns, national costumes etc.), national gifts, contestant gifts and R23000 excess luggage, just to name a few. My family and I had only 4 weeks in between the two international competitions to prepare for Miss Universe, a time frame any industry expert will tell you is almost impossible to achieve. To make everything worse, no one from the Organization even made an effort to come see me off at OR Tambo. I did not let this hinder me. I still went ahead and represented my country to the best of my abilities. The fact that I didn't place at either pageant wasn't because of anything I did or didn't do. I tried my utmost best, poured my heart and soul into it, and firmly believe that it just wasn't my time. I think it is also fair to mention that I was not the only Miss South Africa, that did not place at Internationals; in fact, there were three other Miss South Africa's that did not place in previous years. Perhaps the absence of a South African Director played a role while 99% of all contestants had someone from the national organization present for meetings, events and the final show." She married Louwrens Mahoney, a six-time national champion in 2018. Mahoney has successfully represented KTM (motorcycling) South Africa in both the National Cross Country and Enduro Championship.

Awards and achievements
Preceded by Melinda Bam	South African delegate to Miss Universe; 2013	Succeeded by Ziphozakhe Zokufa
Preceded by Remona Moodley	South African delegate to Miss World; 2013	Succeeded by Rolene Strauss
Preceded by Melinda Bam	Miss South Africa; 2012	Succeeded by Rolene Strauss
