= Anneline Kriel =

South African actress, model and beauty queen

- Kriel in 1974
- Born: 28 July 1955 (age 71); Pretoria, Transvaal, South Africa
- Education: University of Pretoria
- Occupations: Model, Actress
- Spouse(s): Peter Bacon (m. 1996) Phillip Tucker (m. 1989–1994) Sol Kerzner (m. 1980–1985)
- Beauty pageant titleholder
- Title: Miss World 1974; Miss South Africa 1974
- Major competitions: Miss Engineering Queen 1973 (Winner); Miss Rag Queen 1973 (Winner); Miss Northern Transvaal 1973 (Winner); Miss South Africa 1974 (Winner); Miss World 1974 (1st Runner-Up/Winner)

Anneline Kriel (born 28 July 1955) is a South African actress, model and beauty pageant titleholder who won Miss South Africa 1974 and was later crowned Miss World 1974. She is the second of three South African women to hold the Miss World title after Penelope Coelen in 1958 and before Rolene Strauss in 2014. In South Africa she achieved "icon" status where she became known as a "Princess Diana" figure and also appeared in several local film and television projects such as Kill and Kill Again in 1981. She was also in a high-profile marriage (1980-1985) with the late South African hotelier, Sol Kerzner.

== Early life and education ==
Kriel was born in Pretoria to an Afrikaner family and raised in the mining town of Witbank, the daughter of a prison officer. Kriel and her two siblings completed their education at Hoërskool Generaal Hertzog.

As a student, Kriel lived in Huis Asterhof (formerly Vergeet-my-nie) while studying drama at the University of Pretoria. While at university, she was crowned the Rag Queen and won the Miss Northern Transvaal pageant. During this time, Kriel appeared in the film "Somer" and an Afrikaans television drama entitled "Storieboekmoord."

== Career ==
In 1974, at age 19, Kriel won the Miss South Africa beauty pageant. She was awarded the Miss World title that same year, after initially being the first runner-up, as Helen Morgan was disqualified for being an unmarried mother. There was controversy that Kriel was crowned, amid condemnation of apartheid in South Africa. Singer and contest judge, Shirley Bassey, protested against Kriel's crowning. She was coached to avoid answering political questions about her country. She later admitted that she had been raised in a sheltered environment with censored press and scant knowledge of life in South Africa's black townships; “I was 19. I was very innocent. When I finally went to America they asked me on TV if I thought everyone in my country was happy — and I said yes, I did think everyone was happy. Because I did think that.” The tour was also challenging as Kriel was not fluent in English at the time, and had to translate everything in Afrikaans and then back to English in her responses.

In contrast, there was a rapturous response towards Kriel in her native South Africa upon her return to the country. In the absence of royalty and Hollywood actors, beauty pageants have always been given considerable press attention in South Africa. According to Doreen Levin, a veteran reporter for Sunday Times, who covered 18 Miss South Africa pageants, Kriel was "South Africa's substitute for Princess Di," at the height of her fame. She also worked overseas as a model, working in New York for two years and appearing in several television and magazine advertisements for Birra Peroni in Italy.

She also enjoyed some success as an actress, appearing in the action film Kill and Kill Again, alongside James Ryan in 1981. She also appeared in several Afrikaans soap operas, films and stage plays in the 1970s and 1980s. In 1981, Kriel released the pop single "He Took Off My Romeos" and in 2023 reflected on the endeavor in an interview; "I would have liked to be a singer. I tried with He Took Off My Romeos, but realised I didn't have that talent. My friend Marloe Scott Wilson tried to help me, but it was still difficult. The rhythm was reggae and it was interesting, but it was new and unfamiliar to me." Her 1994 cover of Playboy South Africa sold 120000 copies in ten days, bettering the regular monthly circulation of 96000.

In 2007 she attended the 50th anniversary of the Miss South Africa pageant. And in 2017, the Krugerrand-studded dress that Kriel wore as her national costume in the 1974 Miss World pageant was put on public display in the exhibition at the Prins & Prins Diamonds Museum of Gems and Jewellery in Cape Town. In 2018, Kriel added another evening gown that she wore on the evening of the 1974 Miss World Pageant to the exhibition. As of 2021, she had appeared on the cover of the South African celebrity magazine, Huisgenoot magazine thirty-three times.

== Personal life ==
In 1975, Kriel was embroiled in a scandal when she posed for nude photographs taken by Roy Hilligenn, a Mr Bodybuilding South Africa on the Vaal River. Kriel was on vacation at the time with her then-boyfriend, actor-singer, Richard Loring and they were joined by Loring's former friend, Hilligenn. Hilligenn leaked the photos to the media and the Afrikaans newspaper, Rapport published the photographs on the back page of the newspaper to avoid censorship. It became known as the "Sweet Anneline" incident, referencing the song that Loring wrote for Kriel. In 1977 Kriel was reportedly in a relationship with Henke Pistorius, father of Oscar Pistorius. Beeld newspaper reported that Kriel was present when Henke Pistorius accidentally shot himself whilst cleaning his pistol.

Kriel married the South African hotelier, Sol Kerzner, in December 1980 before divorcing five years later.

Kriel converted to Judaism in Switzerland when she married a South African Jewish horse breeder, Philip Tucker in 1989 under the supervision of Rabbi Mordechai Piron (then the rabbi of the Israelitische Cultusgemeinde Zürich (ICZ), the largest Jewish congregation in Switzerland.) South Africa's Chief Rabbi Cyril Harris criticised Piron for undertaking the conversion "without checking with us" and the Johannesburg Beth Din refused the couple permission to marry in an Orthodox synagogue. They subsequently married in a Reform synagogue. The couple lived in Johannesburg and had two daughters together, Tayla and Whitney. Kriel and Tucker divorced in 1994 and the former couple's custody battle dominated headlines in South Africa. Tucker wanted sole custody of the children after the court had given Kriel permission to move the family to a mansion in Bakoven in Cape Town. The High Court awarded custody to Kriel and gave Tucker visitation. As per the court order, the children would continue to be raised in the Jewish faith and continue attending a Jewish private school and they would spend some of the Jewish holidays with their father. Tucker died in an accident in his Johannesburg home in 2008.

In 1997, Kriel and her first husband, Kerzner successfully sought an interdict against Jonathan Ball Publishers Ltd. and Allan Breenblo over Breenblo's Kerzner Unauthorised, the unauthorised biography of Kerzner. They claimed that the content would infringe on their reputations.

After her divorce from Tucker, Kriel married Peter Bacon, the British-born CEO of Sun International and former protegé of Kriel's first husband, Sol Kerzner. The couple lived with Kriel's daughters in Cape Town. In 2007, Kriel accompanied her friend, Denise Goldin at the murder trials for the killers of Goldin's son, actor Brett Goldin and fashion designer Richard Bloom. In Cape Town, Kriel devoted her time to a charity that works with street children.

Kriel is critical of the South African government, citing South African farm attacks, abuse of authority and Black Economic Empowerment policies. She now lives in Mauritius with her third husband, Peter Bacon and their dogs. Her youngest daughter, Whitney, lives in Los Angeles and has a swimwear brand LAYA in Mauritius, whereas her oldest daughter, Tayla, is a dog trainer in Portugal.

== Filmography ==
Film, TV Series/Talk shows and Stage Plays
| Year | Title | Role | Notes |
|---|---|---|---|
| 1973 | Storieboekmoord | | TV series |
| 1974 | Somer | Linda du Preez | Film |
| 1976-1980 | Birra Peroni | | TV |
| 1978 | Iemand Soos Jy | Roelien Allman | Film |
| 1981 | Kill and Kill Again | Kandy Kane | Film |
| 1981 | Oh George | Amanda | TV series |
| 1984 | The Wrong Time of the Year | Ingrid Barnard | Stage Play |
| 1985 | The Marriage-Go-Round | Katrin | Stage Play |
| 1985 | Van der Merwe P.I. | Angel Labuschagne | Film |
| 1985 | Skoppensboer | Hedda Steger | TV series |
| 1987 | Ballade vir 'n Enkeling - 1st Season | Alicia Francke | TV series |
| 1989 | Veels Geluk Happy Returns | Herself | Talk show |
| 1989 | The Tangent Affair | Venetia Tangent | Film |
| 1990 | Reason to Die | Lena Wallace | Film |
| 1999 | Make a Meal of It | Herself | TV |
| 2017 | Halfuur met Hanlie | Herself | Talk Show |
| 2019 | Tussen Ons | Herself | Talk Show |
| 2019 | 'n Huppel in die stap | Herself | TV |
| 2019 | Kwela | Herself | Talk Show |
| 2021 | KoppieTeefontein | Herself | Talk Show |
| 2023 | Bravo | Herself | Talk Show |

Awards and achievements
| Preceded by (United States) Marjorie Wallace | Miss World; 1974 | Succeeded by (Puerto Rico) Wilnelia Merced |
