= Rolene Strauss =

South African beauty queen

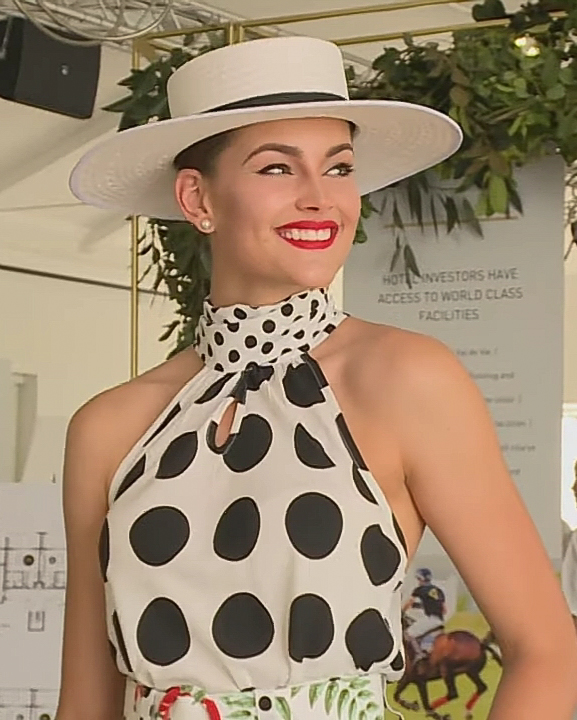
- Strauss in 2018
- Born: 22 April 1992 (age 34); Volksrust, Mpumalanga, South Africa
- Education: University of the Free State
- Height: 1.77 m (5 ft 9 1/2 in)
- Spouse: D'Niel Strauss (m. 2016)
- Children: 3
- Beauty pageant titleholder
- Title: Miss Elite Model Look South Africa 2007; Miss South Africa 2014; Miss World 2014
- Hair colour: Brown
- Eye colour: Grey
- Major competitions: Miss South Africa 2011 (Top 5); Miss South Africa 2014 (Winner); Miss World 2014 (Winner)
- Website: www.rolenestrauss.com

Rolene Strauss (born 22 April 1992) is a South African beauty queen who won Miss South Africa 2014 and was later crowned Miss World 2014. She is the third South African woman to be crowned Miss World, after Penelope Anne Coelen in 1958 and Anneline Kriel in 1974, as well as the first since the end of Apartheid.

Strauss is currently the chairperson of the non-profit organisation The Strauss Foundation.

== Personal life ==
Strauss was a medical student at the University of the Free State. She was born in Volksrust, South Africa, to Theresa, a nurse, and Hennie Strauss, a doctor. She is a test tube baby. In her own words "I'm a test tube baby and I believe my passion for health was born with me".

Strauss became engaged to D'Niel Strauss (no relation) in December 2014. They were later married on 6 February 2016, at the Laurent Wedding venue in Somerset West. Their first child, a son, was born in January 2017. In February 2020, she gave birth to her second son. Rolene Strauss is a devout Christian.

== Pageantry ==
Strauss won her first title at age 15, when she won the Elite Model Look South Africa competition in 2007. Strauss later placed in the top 5 of Miss South Africa 2011, where Melinda Bam became the winner. She returned three years later to compete, representing Bloemfontein, and was crowned Miss South Africa 2014.

As Miss South Africa 2014, Strauss was expected to compete at both Miss Universe 2014 and Miss World 2014. Strauss competed in the Miss World 2014 contest in London, United Kingdom and during the final question and answer round, Strauss was asked - “Why should you be the next Miss World?” to which Strauss responded by stating:

I believe that the story of my book is more meaningful than my cover. Being proudly South African, I have firsthand experience that unity, respect, forgiveness exists and those are the aspirations of the Miss World Organization. So, it would be amazing to represent an organization that is a beacon of hope to the world

She was eventually crowned as Miss World 2014 at the end of the event, becoming the third South African to Miss World since the pageant's inception in 1951. Because of this, she could not compete at Miss Universe 2014. Ziphozakhe Zokufa, her first runner-up, stepped in as Miss South Africa 2014 and represented the country at the Miss Universe 2014 competition.

After being crowned Miss World 2014, Strauss began her responsibilities as Miss World and has since travelled to Hong Kong, China, Indonesia, India, Philippines, Brazil, Sri Lanka, Mexico, Kenya, Jamaica, Cameroon, United Kingdom, the United States amongst other countries to fulfil her various obligations in the role.

Strauss was invited as a judge in Miss World 2018, becoming the first and so far the only Miss World from the 2010s to become a judge in a Miss World finals.

Awards and achievements
Preceded by (Philippines) Megan Young	Miss World; 2014	Succeeded by (Spain) Mireia Lalaguna
Preceded by (Ghana) Carranzar Shooter	Miss World Africa; 2014	Succeeded by (South Africa) Liesl Laurie
Preceded by (North West (South African province)) Marilyn Ramos	Miss South Africa; 2014	Succeeded by (Gauteng) Liesl Laurie
