= Miss World 1998 =

Beauty pageant edition

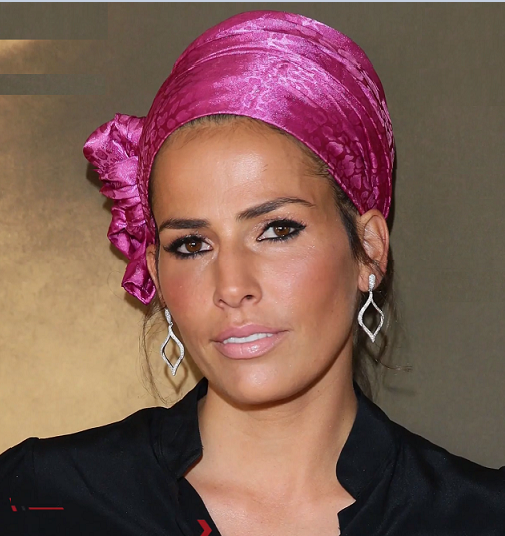
- Miss World 1998 Linor Abargil
- Date: 26 November 1998
- Presenters: Ronan Keating; Eden Harel
- Venue: Lake Berjaya Mahé Resort, Mahé, Seychelles
- Broadcaster: E!; SBC
- Entrants: 86
- Placements: 10
- Debuts: Angola; Kazakhstan; Sint Maarten
- Withdrawals: Cape Verde; Egypt; Honduras; Latvia; Macau; Namibia; Thailand; Uganda
- Returns: Curaçao; Liberia; Mauritius; Nicaragua; Nigeria
- Winner: Linor Abargil; Israel

Miss World 1998, the 48th edition of the Miss World pageant, was held on 26 November 1998 at the Lake Berjaya Mahé Resort in Mahé Island, Seychelles. 86 delegates from around the world competed for the crown. Ronan Keating, then lead singer of Boyzone, and MTV's Eden Harel hosted the event.

At the event's conclusion, this year's winner, Israel's Linor Abargil, revealed days after the competition that she had been raped several weeks before the pageant. She was crowned by Miss World 1997, Diana Hayden of India. And it is the first victory of Israel in the pageant. The 1st Runner-Up was Véronique Caloc representing France and the 2nd Runner-Up was Lina Teoh representing Malaysia.

== Background ==
=== Debuts, and returns, and, withdrawals ===
This edition saw the debut of Angola, Kazakhstan and Sint Maarten, and the return of Curaçao, Liberia, Mauritius, Nicaragua and Nigeria; Nicaragua, which last competed in 1977, Liberia last competed in 1988, Mauritius last competed in 1994 and Curaçao and Nigeria last competed in 1996.

Cape Verde, Egypt, Honduras, Latvia, Macau, Namibia, Thailand, and Uganda, withdrew from the competition. The third runner-up of Miss Honduras 1997, Miriam Eloisa Vivas Luna was chosen to participate at Miss World 1998, but she wasn't able to travel to the contest due to the consequences of Hurricane Mitch in November of that year in Central America. She went to Miss Asia-Pacific 1998. Miss Macau pageant stop to held due lack of sponsorship and low televiewers. Only was held in 2008 for 2 years.

== Results ==
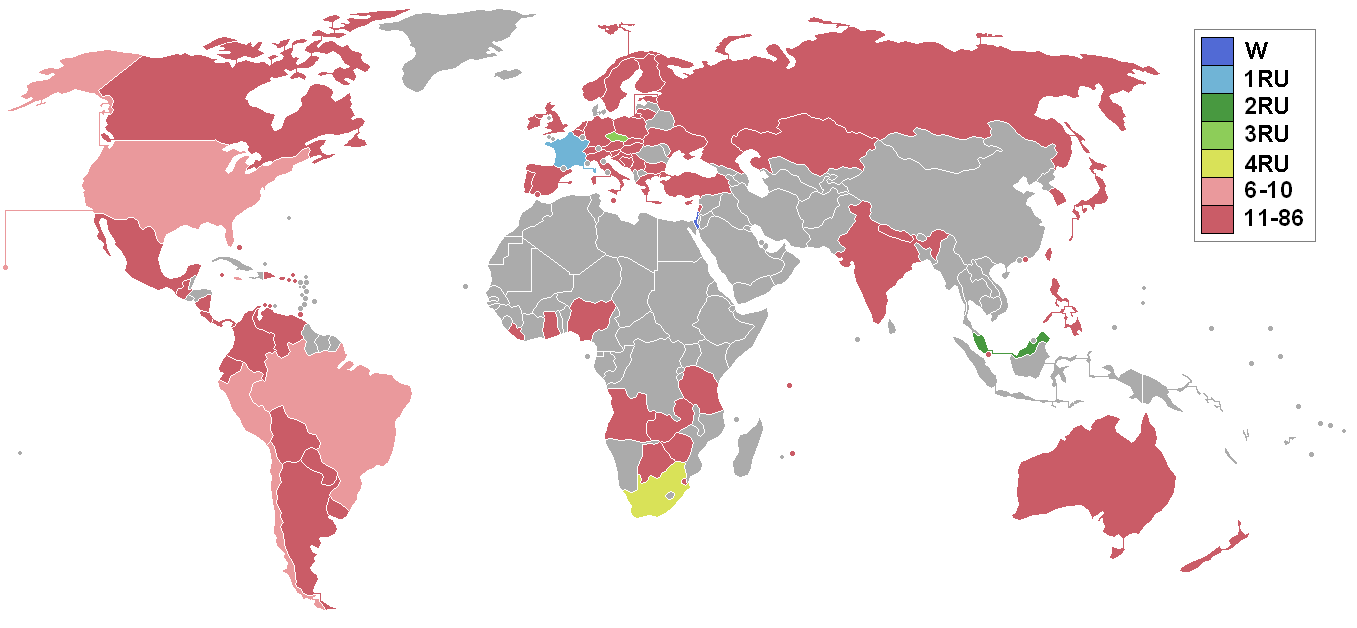
Countries and territories which sent delegates and results for Miss World 1998

=== Placements ===
Placement	Contestant
Miss World 1998	Israel – Linor Abargil
1st Runner-Up	France – Véronique Caloc
2nd Runner-Up	Malaysia – Lina Teoh
Top 5	Czech Republic – Alena Šeredová; South Africa – Kerishnie Naiker
Top 10	Brazil – Adriana Reis; Chile – Daniella Campos; Jamaica – Christine Straw; Peru – Mariana Larrabure; United States – Shauna Gambill

==== Continental Queens of Beauty ====
Continental Group	Contestant
Africa	South Africa – Kerishnie Naiker
Americas	Chile – Daniella Campos
Asia & Oceania	Malaysia – Lina Teoh
Caribbean	Jamaica – Christine Straw
Europe	Israel – Linor Abargil

== Judges ==
- Eric Morley – Chairman and CEO of Miss World Organization
- Diana Hayden – Miss World 1997 from India
- Sophie Dahl
- Pilin Leon – Miss World 1981 from Venezuela
- Jonah Lomu
- Mark Newson
- Terry O'Neill
- Mica Paris
- Jacques Villeneuve

== Contestants ==
- Angola – Maria Manuela Cortez de Lemos João
- Argentina – Natalia Elisa González
- Aruba – Judelca Shahira Briceno
- Australia – Sarah-Jane Camille St. Clair
- Austria – Sabine Lindorfer
- Bahamas – LeTeasha Henrietta Ingraham
- Belgium – Tanja Dexters
- Bolivia – Bianca Bauer Áñez
- Bosnia and Herzegovina – Samra Tojaga
- Botswana – Earthen Pinkinyana Mbulawa
- Brazil – Adriana Reis
- British Virgin Islands – Virginia Olen Rubiane
- Bulgaria – Polina Petkova
- Canada – Leanne Baird
- Cayman Islands – Gemma Marie McLaughlin
- Chile – Daniella Andrea Campos Lathrop
- Colombia – Mónica Marcela Cuartas Jiménez
- Costa Rica – María Luisa Ureña Salazar
- Croatia – Lejla Šehović
- Curaçao – Jeameane Veronica Colastica
- Cyprus – Chrysanthi Michael
- Czech Republic – Alena Šeredová
- Dominican Republic – Sharmin Arelis Díaz Costo
- Ecuador – Vanessa Natania Graf Alvear
- Estonia – Ly Jürgenson
- Finland – Maaret Saija Nousiainen
- France – Véronique Caloc
- Germany – Sandra Ahrabian
- Ghana – Efia Owusuaa Marfo
- Gibraltar – Melanie Soiza
- Greece – Katia Margaritoglou
- Guatemala – Glenda Iracema Cifuentes Ruiz
- Holland – Nerena Ruinemans
- Hong Kong (Note: Hong Kong China) – Jessie Chiu Chui-Yi
- Hungary – Éva Horváth
- India – Annie Thomas
- Ireland – Vivienne Doyle
- Israel – Linor Abargil
- Italy – Maria Concetta Travaglini
- Jamaica – Christine Renee Straw
- Japan – Rie Mochizuki
- Kazakhstan – Anna Kirpota
- Lebanon – Clemence Achkar
- Liberia – Olivia Precious Cooper
- Lithuania – Kristina Pakarnaitė
- Malaysia – Lina Teoh
- Malta – Rebecca Camilleri
- Mauritius – Oona Sujaya Fulena
- Mexico – Vilma Verónica Zamora Suñol
- Nepal – Jyoti Pradhan
- New Zealand – Tanya Hayward
- Nicaragua – Claudia Patricia Alaniz Hernández
- Nigeria – Temitayo Osobu
- Norway – Henriette Dankersten
- Panama – Lorena del Carmen Zagía Miro
- Paraguay – Perla Carolina Benítez Gonzales
- Peru – Mariana Larrabure de Orbegoso
- Philippines – Rachel Muyot Soriano
- Poland – Izabela Opęchowska
- Portugal – Marcia Vasconcelos
- Puerto Rico – Antonia Alfonso Pagán
- Russia – Tatiana Makrouchina
- Seychelles – Alvina Antoinette Grand d'Court
- Singapore – Grace Chay
- Sint Maarten (Note: competed as Saint Martin) – Myrtille Charlotte Brookson
- Slovakia – Karolína Čičatková
- Slovenia – Mihaela Novak
- South Africa – Kerishnie Naiker
- South Korea (Note: competed as Korea) – Kun-woo Kim
- Spain – Rocío Jiménez Fernández
- Swaziland – Cindy Stanckoczi
- Sweden – Jessica Almenäs
- Switzerland – Sonja Grandjean
- (Chinese Taipei) Taiwan (Note: competed as Chinese Taipei) – Yi-Ju Chen
- Tanzania – Basila Kalubha Mwanukuzi
- Trinidad and Tobago – Jeanette Marie La Caillie
- Turkey – Buket Saygı
- Ukraine – Nataliya Nadtochey
- United Kingdom – Emmalene McLoughlin
- United States – Shauna Gambill
- United States Virgin Islands (Note: competed as American Virgin Islands) – Wendy Sanchez
- Uruguay – María Desiree Fernández Mautone
- Venezuela – Verónica Schneider
- (Federal Republic of Yugoslavia) Yugoslavia – Jelena Jakovljević
- Zambia – Chisala Chibesa
- Zimbabwe – Annette Kambarami

=== Scrutineer ===
- David Boyd

== Notes ==
- Miss Malaysia, Lina Teoh is the cousin of the owner for Lake Berjaya Resort, Mahé.

=== Replacements ===
- Bahamas - Nadia Rodgers-Albury was originally supposed to compete at Miss World but ended not competing after the Miss Bahamas Committee lost the franchise to a new organization and that organization decided to hold a new contest which crowned another queen that took her place.
- Czech Republic – Miss Czech Republic 1998, Kateřina Stočesová was remplaced with her First Runner up - Alena Šeredová due her lack of English Language skills. She later won the Queen of the World 1998 title in same November.
- France - Véronique Caloc was the first runner-up at Miss France 1998, representing Martinique. She was chosen to represent France at Miss World, while the winner of Miss France 1998, Sophie Thalmann, participated at Miss Universe 1998.
- Kazakhstan – Dana Tolesh

=== Withdrawals ===
- Latvia - Evija Rucevska - She withdrew for personal reasons, but competed a year later in Miss World 1999.
- Namibia - Miss Namibia 1998, Retha Reinders did not participate due to the lack of sponsorship.
- Thailand - Lacked sponsorship to send a delegate.
- Uganda

=== Did not compete ===
- Bangladesh - Shaila Simi - Miss World Bangladesh 1998 withdrew from the competition for unknown reasons.
- Belize - Viola Jeffery - Due to lack of sponsors. She went to Miss Universe 1999.
- Bonaire - Julina Felida - Due to lack of sponsors. She went to Miss Universe 1999.
- Iraq - Ban Kadret - She withdrew because of a disagreement between Eric Morley and the Miss Iraq organizers, due to sanctions placed on Iraq.
- Suriname - Miss Suriname 1998, Farah Breeveld did not participate due to the lack of sponsorship.
