= Sonia Raciti =

South African model

Sonia Raciti Oshry is a South African model and beauty pageant titleholder who won Miss South Africa 1998. She was the official representative of South Africa to the 48th Miss Universe pageant held in Chaguaramas, Trinidad and Tobago on May 26, 1999, where she finished as the 4th runner-up. She went on to represent South Africa in the 49th Miss World pageant held in London, England, UK on December 4, 1999, where she finished as the 2nd runner-up. Raciti also won the Africa's Queen of Beauty Award during the Miss World contest.

She has recently served as both a judge and mentor in the Miss South Africa pageants.
