= Miss South Africa 2008 =

- Date: 24 January 2009
- Presenters: Carol Manana; Mutodi Neshehe
- Entertainment: DJ Fresh; Dana Dinner; Lira; Jaziel Brothers; KB Motsilanyane; Nádine; Steve Hofmeyr
- Venue: Sun City Superbowl, Rustenburg, South Africa
- Broadcaster: SABC
- Winner: Tatum Keshwar

Miss South Africa 2008 was held on 15 December 2008 in Sun City, South Africa. The winner will represent South Africa at Miss Universe 2009 and Miss World 2009. 12 contestants competed for crown.

== Results ==
Color keys

- The contestant Won in an International pageant.
- The contestant was a Runner-up in an International pageant.
- The contestant was a Semi-Finalist in an International pageant.
- Unplaced

Final Results	Candidate	International Placement
Miss South Africa 2008	KwaZulu-Natal − Tatum Keshwar	Top 10 − Miss Universe 2009; 2nd Runner-Up − Miss World 2009
Miss Universe South Africa 2009	KwaZulu-Natal − Tatum Keshwar	Top 10 − Miss Universe 2009; 2nd Runner-Up − Miss World 2009
Miss World South Africa 2009	KwaZulu-Natal − Tatum Keshwar	Top 10 − Miss Universe 2009; 2nd Runner-Up − Miss World 2009
1st Runner-up	Western Cape − Anja van Zyl	
2nd Runner-up	Mpumalanga − Buyi Shongwe	
Top 5	Western Cape − Michelle Gildenhuys; Gauteng − Cara Burger	

== Contestants ==
Contestant	Age	Height (in.)	Height (mt.)	Hometown
Michelle Gildenhuys	20	5'5"	165	Cape Town
Jodi Balfour	21	5'9"	175	Cape Town
Sarah Kate Seaward	25	5'11"	181	Johannesburg
Cara Burger	20	5'10"	178	Vereeniging
Sian Ryan	21	5'9"	176	Johannesburg
Tatum Keshwar	24	5'11"	182	Durban
Nthabiseng Marie	22	6'1"	185	Balgowan
Buyisiwe (Buyi) Shongwe	24	5'10"	179	Nelspruit
Anja van Zyl	20	6'0"	183	Cape Town
Dorah Mtetwa	23	5'8"	174	Soweto
Mpho Sithole	20	5'10"	178	Johannesburg
Bridgette Maasch	23	5'10”	176	Cape Town

== Judges ==
- Sonia Raciti Oshry
- Esmaré Weideman
- Nivasha Naidoo
- Rosie Motene
- Bongani Nxumalo
- Gareth Tjasink
