= Claudia Henkel =

South African beauty queen (born 1983)

- Born: Claudia Henkel; 22 April 1983 (age 43); Pretoria, South Africa
- Height: 6 ft 1 in (1.85 m)
- Beauty pageant titleholder
- Title: Miss South Africa 2004
- Hair color: Blonde
- Eye color: Blue

Claudia Henkel (born 22 April 1983 in Pretoria, South Africa) is a South African beauty pageant titleholder who held the title Miss South Africa 2004. She competed in the Miss Universe 2005 pageant in Thailand and placed in the top fifteen.

Preceded by Joan Ramagoshi	Miss South Africa; 2004	Succeeded by Nokuthula Sithole
