= Miss South Africa 2011 =

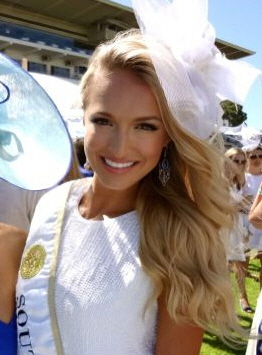
- Melinda Bam, Miss South Africa 2011
- Date: January 22, 2012
- Presenters: Bridget Masinga, Proverb, and Michelle McLean
- Entertainment: Big Nuz, RNB,“Hotstix” Mabuse and RJ Bejamin
- Venue: Sun City Superbowl, Rustenburg, South Africa
- Broadcaster: Mzansi Magic
- Entrants: 12
- Placements: 5
- Winner: Melinda Bam; Pretoria

Miss South Africa 2011 was held on 11 December 2011 in Sun City, South Africa. The winner represented South Africa at Miss Universe 2012 and Miss World 2011. 12 contestants competed for the crown. Melinda Bam was crowned Miss South Africa 2011 by the outgoing title holder Bokang Montjane from Johannesburg.

== Winner and runners-up ==
Color keys

- The contestant Won in an International pageant.
- The contestant was a Runner-up in an International pageant.
- The contestant was a Semi-Finalist in an International pageant.
- Unplaced

Final Results	Candidate	International Placement
Miss South Africa 2011	Gauteng − Melinda Bam	Top 10
Miss Universe South Africa 2012	Gauteng − Melinda Bam	Top 10
1st Princess	Western Cape − Remona Moodley	Unplaced
Miss World South Africa 2012	Western Cape − Remona Moodley	Unplaced
2nd Princess	Gauteng − Thuli Sangweni	
Top 5	Mpumalanga − Rolene Strauss; Gauteng − Sian Schelbusch	

== Top 12 ==
Contestant	Age	Province	Hometown
Caylene Marais	21	Gauteng	Roodepoort
Frieda Du Plessis	25	Gauteng	Pretoria
Grace Rheeders	21	KwaZulu Natal	Durban
Lerato Mokoena	22	Gauteng	Vereeniging
Lwandle Ngwenya	21	KwaZulu Natal	Durban
Melinda Bam	22	Gauteng	Pretoria
Pinky Mathope	21	Gauteng	Bekkersdal
Remona Moodley	22	Western Cape	Cape Town
Rolene Strauss	19	Mpumalanga	Volksrust
Sian Schleusch	21	Gauteng	Johannesburg
Tamerin Jardine	23	Gauteng	Johannesburg
Thuli Sangweni	21	Gauteng	Germiston

== Judges ==
- Sonia Raciti-Oshry
- Joan Ramagoshi
- Sonia Booth
- Kieno Kammies
- Gert Joan Coetzee
- Paledi Segapo
