= Melinda Bam =

South African beauty pageant contestant and TV personality

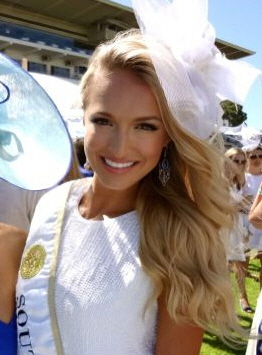
- Born: Melinda de Kock; 13 May 1989 (age 37); Pretoria, South Africa
- Education: University of Pretoria
- Occupations: TV Presenter, Motivational Speaker, Model, author, fashion designer
- Height: 1.70 m (5 ft 7 in)
- Spouse(s): Adriaan Berg (m. 2014) (2 children)
- Beauty pageant titleholder
- Title: Miss South Africa 2011
- Hair color: Blonde
- Eye color: Brown
- Major competitions: Miss South Africa 2011 (Winner); Miss Universe 2012 (Top 10)

Melinda Bam (born 13 May 1989) is a South African TV host, model and beauty pageant titleholder who was crowned Miss South Africa 2011, becoming the official representative of her country to Miss Universe 2012. She has a swimwear line called Bambshell, for which she worked with South African swimwear brand.

== Early life ==
Melinda Bam (born Melinda de Kock) was raised in Pretoria. Her father, Deon de Kock, was a minister of the Dutch Reformed Church who killed himself in 1999 after he and Melinda's mom, gospel singer Wanda de Kock, were divorced earlier in the year. He had only served one congregation, Glenharvie, which merged with Westonaria in 1996, where after he was retrenched. Melinda was born in 1989 and has two sisters, Melissa Swart and Sybil Bam. She is a model and studied B.Com. Marketing at the University of Pretoria. She entered Miss South Africa 2011 and won the pageant on her first attempt.

== Miss South Africa 2011 ==
She was crowned Miss South Africa 2011 at an event held at the Sun City Super Bowl on 11 December 2011.

== Miss Universe 2012 ==
Melinda Bam represented South Africa in December at Miss Universe 2012, which was held in Las Vegas, and placed among the top 10.

She did not participate in the Miss World 2012 pageant because if a contestant reaches the top three of the pageant she is not permitted to enter Miss Universe. The 1st princess Remona Moodley represented South Africa at Miss World 2012 instead.

== Miss South Africa national executive ==
In June 2013 it was announced that Melinda Bam was appointed as national executive for the Miss South Africa Pageant, and she would be in charge of arranging potential sponsors for the pageant, as well as preparing the outgoing queens to both the Miss World and Miss Universe pageants. Her management proved successful and partly due to her guidance, secured the crown for 2014 Miss World titleholder Rolene Strauss.

== Personal life ==
Her family name is of German origin. Bam announced in November 2013 that she is engaged to Mr South Africa 2011, Adriaan Bergh. The two former beauty pageant title carriers got engaged during a holiday in Dubai. They were married in November 2014 at Oakfield Farm, Gauteng, South Africa. They have two children. One of their children, born in November 2024 was at just 31 weeks.

Awards and achievements
Preceded by Bokang Montjane	Miss South Africa; 2011	Succeeded by Marilyn Ramos
