= Miss World 1974 =

24th Miss World pageant

- Anneline Kriel
- Date: 22 November 1974
- Presenters: Michael Aspel; David Vine
- Venue: Royal Albert Hall, London, United Kingdom
- Broadcaster: BBC
- Entrants: 57
- Placements: 15
- Debuts: Barbados; Guernsey; Jersey; Zambia
- Withdrawals: Cyprus; Iceland; Luxembourg; Mauritius; Peru; Portugal; Seychelles; Turkey
- Returns: Costa Rica; Denmark; Ecuador; Germany; India; Madagascar; Nicaragua
- Winner: Anneline Kriel; South Africa (Note: Assumed the title following Morgan's resignation)

Miss World 1974 was the 24th edition of the Miss World pageant, held at the Royal Albert Hall in London, United Kingdom on 22 November 1974.

At the end of the event, Julia Morley crowned Helen Morgan of the United Kingdom as Miss World 1974. It was the first mother to win and the fourth victory for the United Kingdom in the history of the pageant. Anneline Kriel of South Africa finished as first runner-up, while Lea Klein of Israel finished as second runner-up.

Although pageant organizers knew that Morgan was a single mother and had a child when she won Miss Wales, Morgan relinquished her title four days after the pageant due to intense media interest that had a negative impact on her. She was replaced by her first runner-up, Anneline Kriel. This was the second time South Africa won the pageant.

Contestants from fifty-seven countries and territories participated in this pageant. Michael Aspel and David Vine hosted the pageant.

== Background ==
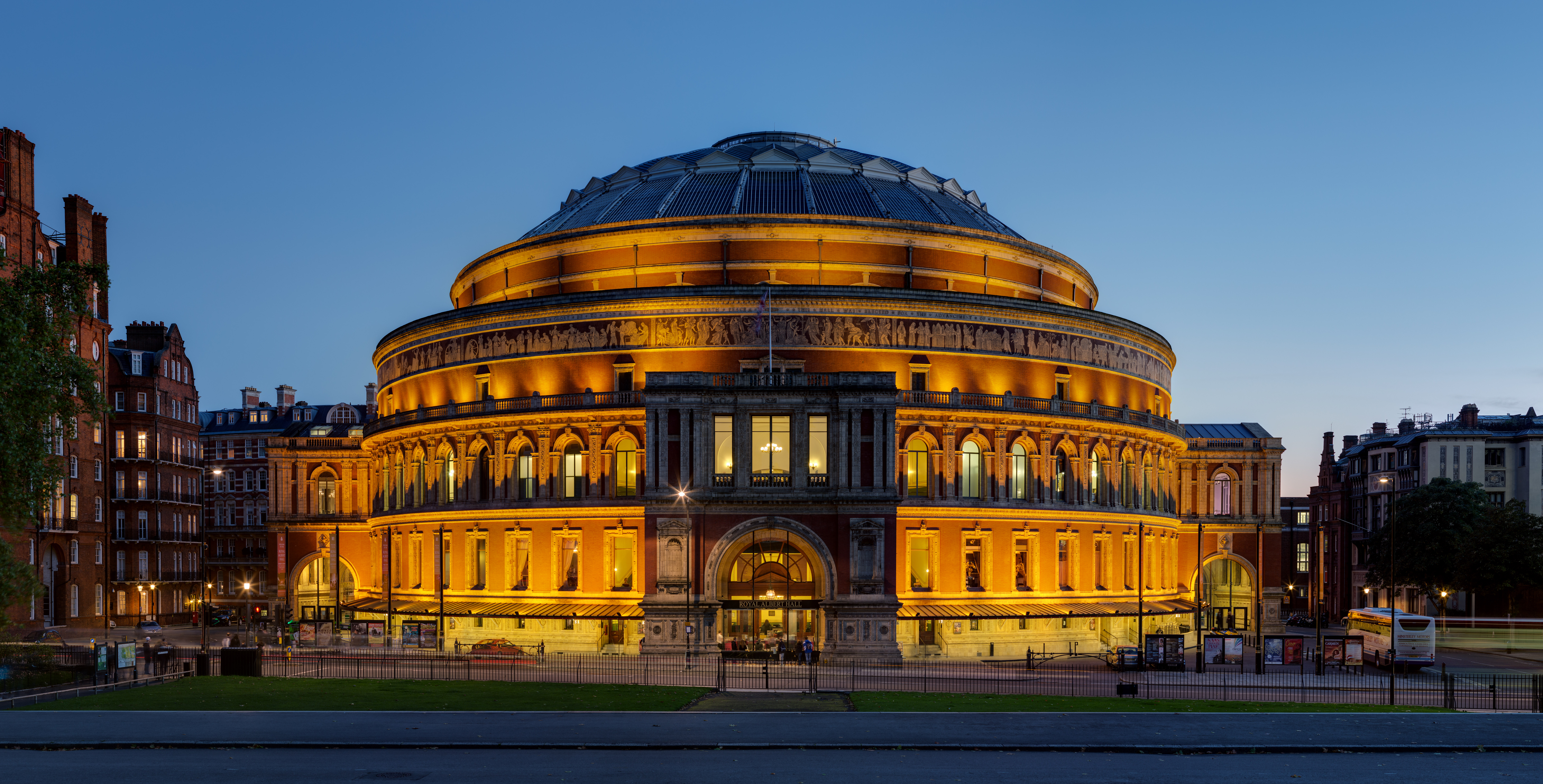
Royal Albert Hall, the location of Miss World 1974

=== Selection of participants ===
Participants from fifty-seven countries and territories were chosen to compete in the pageant. Five contestants were appointed to represent their countries/territories after placing as runners-up in their national pageants, or were selected through a casting process, and one contestant was appointed after the original delegate withdrew.

==== Replacements ====
Miss Mexico 1974 first runner-up Rebeca Pico Zazueta was originally scheduled to compete in this edition. However, she did not compete due to undisclosed reasons, and she was replaced by Miss Mexico 1974 Guadalupe Elorriaga as Mexico's representative at Miss World.

==== Debuts, returns, and withdrawals ====
The countries of Barbados, Guernsey, Jersey, and Zambia competed for the first time. Returning to this edition were Madagascar, which last competed in 1961; Denmark, which last competed in 1970; Nicaragua, which last competed in 1971; and Germany, Ecuador, India, and Costa Rica, which all last competed in 1972.

Luxembourg, Iceland, Mauritius, Peru, Portugal, Seychelles, Cyprus, and Turkey did not compete in this edition. Valgerdur Hjartarsdóttir of Iceland, Nirmala Sohun of Mauritius, and Hale Soygazi of Turkey did not compete due to undisclosed reasons. Alice Vieira of Portugal did not compete due to the revolution that took place in Portugal in April 1974. Christiana Agathaggelou of Cyprus did not compete due to the crisis of the Turkish invasion of that country. Iceland, Peru, and Seychelles did not compete in this edition after their national organizations failed to hold a national competition or appoint a delegate.

== Results ==
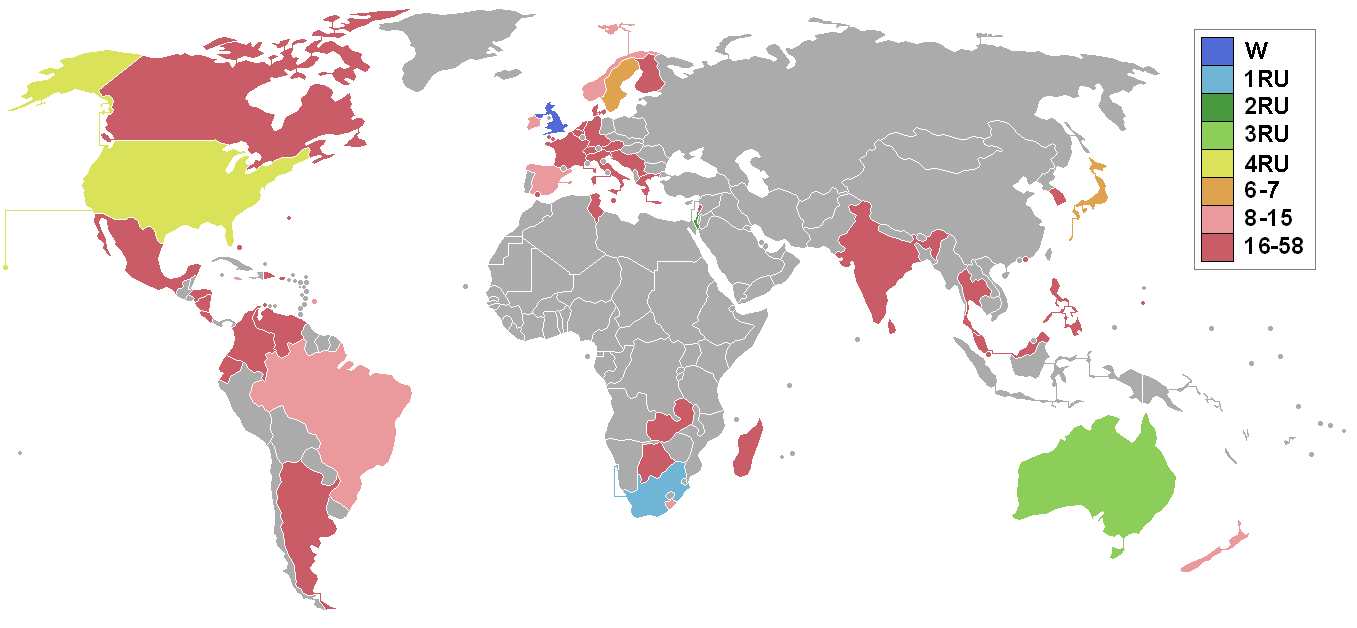
Countries and territories which participated in Miss World 1974 and their placements.

Helen Morgan of the United Kingdom, the original winner

=== Placements ===
| Placement | Contestant |
|---|---|
| Miss World 1974 | United Kingdom – Helen Morgan (Note: Resigned four days later due to intense pressure and media attention) |
| 1st runner-up | South Africa – Anneline Kriel |
| 2nd runner-up | Israel – Lea Klein |
| 3rd runner-up | Australia – Gail Petith |
| 4th runner-up | United States – Terry Ann Browning |
| Top 7 | Japan – Chikako Shima; Sweden – Jill Lindqvist |
| Top 15 | Barbados – Linda Field; Brazil – Mariza Sommer; (Republic of Ireland) Ireland – Julie Ann Farnham; Jamaica – Andrea Lyon; New Zealand – Sue Nicholson; Norway – Torill Larsen; South Africa (Note: Black representative from South Africa competed as Miss Africa South in the pageant) – Evelyn Williams; Spain – Natividad Rodríguez |

== Pageant ==
=== Format ===
As in 1961, fifteen semi-finalists were chosen through a preliminary competition held on the day of the final competition, which consisted of the swimsuit and evening gown competitions. The fifteen semi-finalists competed in the swimsuit and evening gown competitions, and seven finalists were subsequently chosen to compete in the final interview.

=== Selection committee ===
- Shirley Bassey – English singer
- Alexandra Bastedo – English actress
- John Conteh – English boxer
- Anita Harris – English actress and singer
- David Hemery – English Olympic medalist for the 1968 Summer Olympics
- Eric Morley – Chairman of Mecca and founder of Miss World
- Patrick Mower – English actor
- August Scerri – Maltese High Commissioner to the United Kingdom
- John Spencer-Churchill – 10th Duke of Marlborough

== Contestants ==
Fifty-seven contestants competed for the title.

| Country/Territory | Contestant | Age (Note: Ages at the time of the pageant) | Hometown |
|---|---|---|---|
| Argentina | Sara Barberi | 22 | – |
| Aruba | Esther Marugg | 18 | Oranjestad |
| Australia | Gail Petith | 19 | Sydney |
| Austria | Eveline Engleder | 20 | Vienna |
| (The Bahamas) Bahamas | Monique Cooper | 18 | Nassau |
| Barbados | Linda Field | 19 | Bridgetown |
| Belgium | Anne-Marie Sikorski | 21 | Liège |
| Bermuda | Joyce de Rosa | 22 | Hamilton |
| Botswana | Rosemary Moleti | 20 | Gaborone |
| Brazil | Mariza Sommer | 19 | Brasilia |
| Canada | Sandra Campbell | 22 | Leamington |
| Colombia | Luz María Osorio | 18 | Antioquia |
| Costa Rica | Rose Marie Leprade | 21 | Guanacaste |
| Denmark | Jane Moller | 20 | Copenhagen |
| Dominican Republic | Giselle Scanlon | 18 | La Vega |
| Ecuador | Silvia Jurado | 19 | Playas |
| Finland | Merja Ekman | 20 | – |
| France | Edna Tepava | 19 | Papeete |
| Germany | Sabrina Erlmeier | 22 | Fürstenzell |
| Gibraltar | Patricia Orfila | 19 | Gibraltar |
| Greece | Evgenia Dafni | 17 | – |
| Guam | Rosemary Cruz Pablo | 21 | Agana |
| Guernsey | Gina Atkinson | 18 | Saint Peter Port |
| Honduras | Leslie Suez | 24 | Tegucigalpa |
| Hong Kong | Judy Dirkin | 18 | Hong Kong |
| India | Kiran Dholakia | 17 | Maharashtra |
| (Republic of Ireland) Ireland | Julie Farnham | 17 | Dublin |
| Israel | Lea Klein | 22 | Tel Aviv |
| Italy | Zaira Zoccheddu | – | – |
| Jamaica | Andrea Lyon | 22 | Kingston |
| Japan | Chikako Shima | 18 | Gifu |
| Jersey | Christine Sangan | 23 | Saint Helier |
| Lebanon | Gisèle Hachem | 18 | Beirut |
| Madagascar | Raobelina Harisoa | 20 | Antananarivo |
| Malaysia | Shirley Tan | 21 | Johor Bahru |
| Malta | Mary Louis Elull | 19 | Sliema |
| Mexico | Guadalupe Elorriaga | 20 | Mazatlán |
| Netherlands | Gerarda Balm | 18 | Amersfoort |
| New Zealand | Sue Nicholson | 22 | Auckland |
| Nicaragua | Francis Duarte | 21 | Leon |
| Norway | Torill Larsen | 20 | Ålesund |
| Philippines | Agnes Rustia | 17 | Baliuag |
| Portugal | Maria Helene Pereira Martins | 23 | Lisbon |
| Puerto Rico | Loyda Valle | 21 | Camuy |
| Singapore | Valerie Oh | 23 | Singapore |
| South Africa | Evelyn Williams | 18 | Cape Town |
| South Africa | Anneline Kriel | 19 | Johannesburg |
| South Korea | Shim Kyoung-sook | 22 | Seoul |
| Spain | Natividad Rodríguez | 19 | Valverde |
| Sri Lanka | Vinodini Roshanara Jayskera | – | – |
| Sweden | Jill Lindqvist | 19 | Gothenburg |
| Switzerland | Astrid Angst | 21 | Bern |
| Thailand | Orn-Jir Chaisatra | – | Bangkok |
| United Kingdom | Helen Morgan | 22 | Barry |
| United States | Terry Ann Browning | 20 | Ormond Beach |
| Venezuela | Alicia Rivas | 19 | Vargas |
| Yugoslavia | Jadranka Banjac | 19 | Belgrade |
| Zambia | Christine Munkombwe | 18 | Lusaka |
