= Miss World 1958 =

8th Miss World pageant

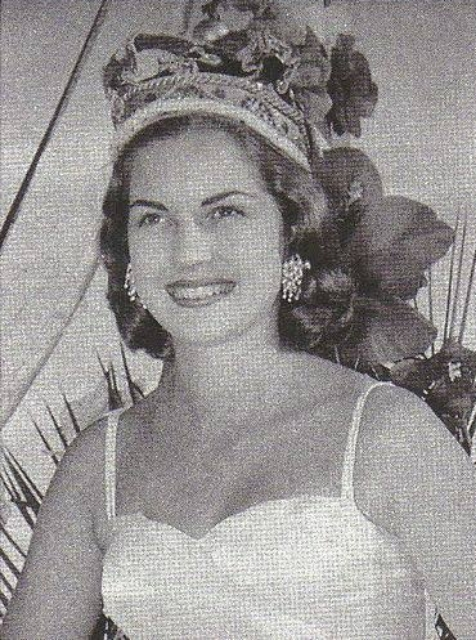
- Penelope Coelen
- Date: 13 October 1958
- Presenters: Bob Russell
- Venue: Lyceum Ballroom, London, United Kingdom
- Entrants: 20
- Placements: 6
- Debuts: Brazil
- Withdrawals: Australia; Austria; Finland; Iceland; Luxembourg; Tunisia
- Returns: Norway; Turkey
- Winner: Penelope Coelen; South Africa

Miss World 1958 was the eighth edition of the Miss World pageant, held at the Lyceum Ballroom in London, United Kingdom, on 13 October 1958.

At the conclusion of the event, Charles Eade and Bob Russell crowned Penelope Coelen of South Africa as Miss World 1958. This is the first victory of South Africa and the second victory of Africa in the history of the pageant.

Contestants from twenty countries participated in this year's pageant. The pageant was hosted by Bob Russell.

== Background ==
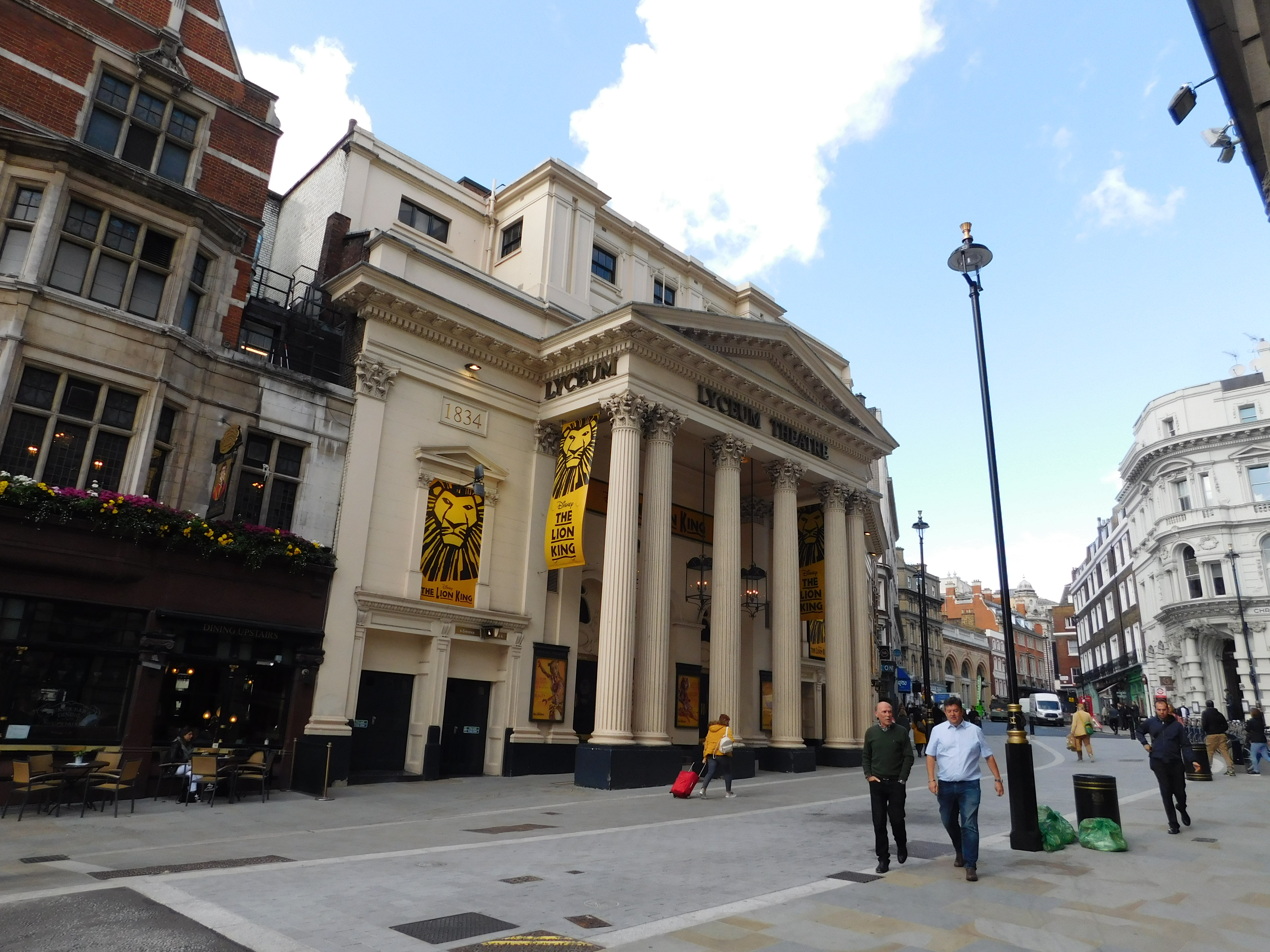
Lyceum Ballroom, venue of Miss World 1958

=== Selection of participants ===
Twenty contestants were selected to compete in the pageant. One contestant was appointed to represent her country in this edition after contracting an illness from the previous edition.

==== Replacements ====
Miss Belgium 1958, Michele Gouthals was scheduled to represent her country in this edition. However, she was unable to participate in the competition because her organization appointed Miss Belgium 1957, Jeanne Chandelle to represent Belgium once again because she contracted the Asian flu during the Miss World 1957 pageant and only showed up on the day of the coronation.

==== Debuts, returns and withdrawals ====
This edition marked the debut of Brazil, and the returns of Turkey, which last competed in 1953, and Norway last competed in 1954.

Hanni Ehrenstrasser of Austria withdrew after winning Miss Europe 1958, making her ineligible to compete at Miss World. Elisabeth Schübel-Auer, Miss Austria of the previous year, was set to replace Ehrenstrasser, but did not push through for undisclosed reasons. Leila Saas of Egypt withdrew for financial reasons. Pirkko Mannola of Finland, Hjördís Sigurvinsdóttir of Iceland, Lydie Schmit of Luxembourg, and Denise Orlando of Tunisia withdrew for undisclosed reasons. Australia withdrew after their organization failed to hold a national competition or appoint a candidate.

Janet Ohene-Agyei Boateng of Ghana was supposed to compete, but withdrew due to financial constraints. Krystyna Żyła of Poland was supposed to compete as well, but was barred by her government from competing. She was eventually found dead in December 1958.

== Results ==
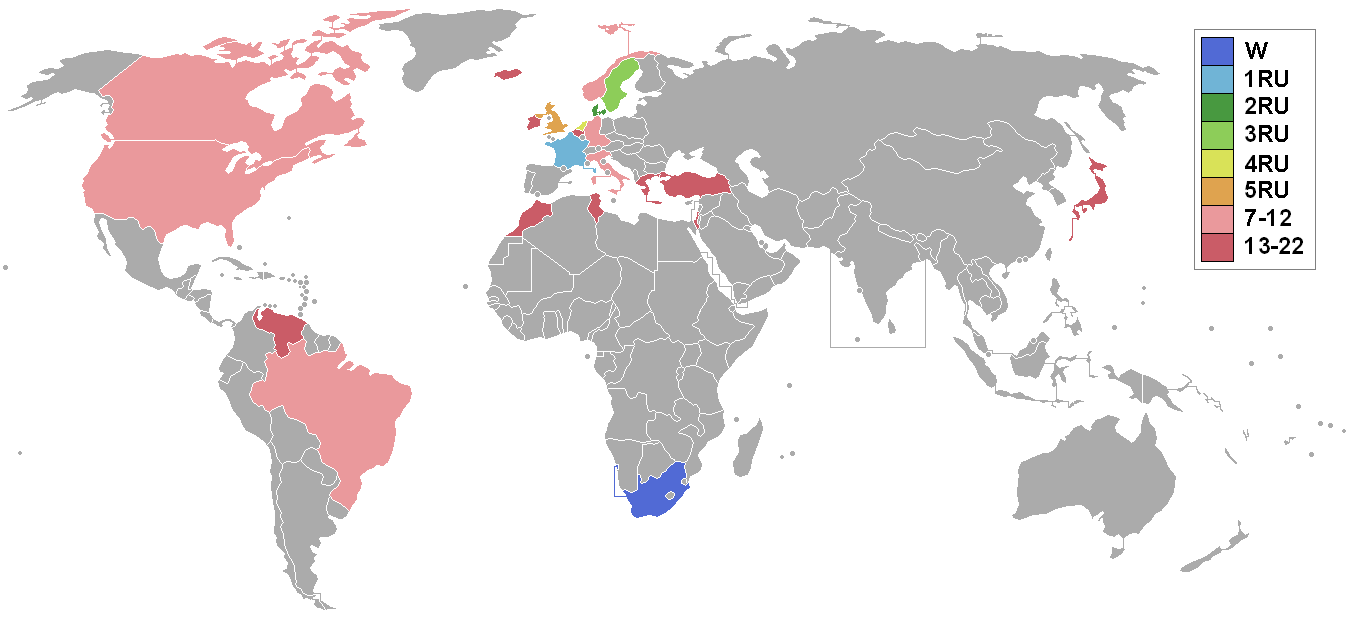
Miss World 1958 participating countries and territories

Placement	Contestant
Miss World 1958	South Africa – Penelope Coelen
1st runner-up	France – Claudine Auger
2nd runner-up	Denmark – Vinnie Ingemann
3rd runner-up	Sweden – Harriet Wågström
4th runner-up	Holland – Lucienne Struve
5th runner-up	United Kingdom – Eileen Sheridan

== Pageant ==
=== Format ===
The number of placements in this edition has been reduced to six from seven in the previous edition. The six finalists were selected through a preliminary competition held on the day of the final competition consisting of a swimsuit and an evening gown competition.

=== Selection committee ===
- Claude Berr – Co-head of the Miss Europe committee
- Cowan Dobson – Scottish portrait artist
- Charles Eade – British newspaper editor; Member of the Council of the British Commonwealth Press Union
- Taina Elg – Finnish-American actress
- Barbara Goalen – British fashion model
- Charles Jacobs – American photographer
- Stirling Moss – English Formula One racer
- Cynthia Oberholzer – South African model
- Oscar Santa Maria – former Brazilian politician
- Shakuntala Sharma – Indian Princess and fashion designer

== Contestants ==
Twenty contestants competed for the title.

Country	Contestant	Age (Note: Age at the time of the pageant)	Hometown
Belgium	Jeanne Chandelle	19	Brussels
Brazil	Sônia Maria Campos	20	Recife
Canada	Marilyn Anne Keddie	21	Flin Flon
Denmark	Vinnie Ingemann	18	Copenhagen
France	Claudine Auger	17	Paris
Greece	Mary Panoutospoulou	19	Athens
Holland	Lucienne Struve	19	Rotterdam
Ireland	Susan Riddell	17	Derry
Israel	Rachel Shafrir	19	Tel Aviv
Italy	Elisabetta Velinsky	18	Rome
Japan	Hisako Okuse	23	Saitama
Morocco	Jocelyne Lambin	21	Rabat
Norway	Åse Qjeldvik	19	Oslo
South Africa	Penelope Coelen	18	Durban
Sweden	Harriet Margareta Wågström	20	Stockholm
Turkey	Sunay Uslu	18	Istanbul
United Kingdom (Note: Competed as United Kingdom for the first time in the pageant)	Eileen Sheridan	22	Walton-on-Thames
United States	Nancy Anne Corcoran	23	Washington D.C.
Venezuela	Ida Margarita Pieri	18	Carúpano
West Germany	Dagmar Herner	20	Bavaria
