= Penelope Coelen =

South African actress, model and Miss World 1958 (born 1940)

Penelope Anne Coelen
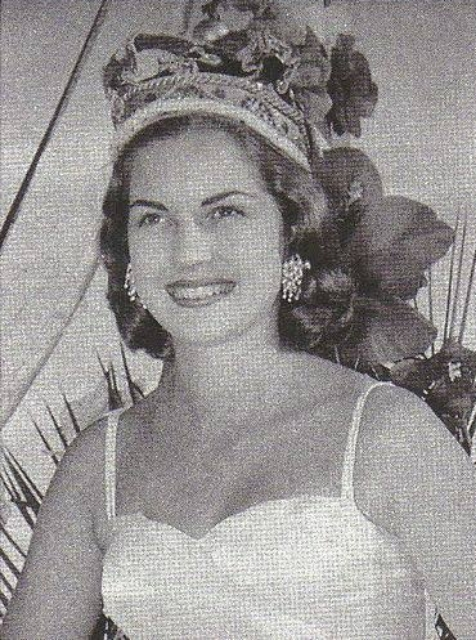
- Coelen in 1958
- Born: 15 April 1940 (age 86); Durban, South Africa
- Occupations: Model, Actress
- Beauty pageant titleholder
- Title: Miss World 1958; Miss South Africa 1958
- Major competitions: Miss South Africa 1958 (Winner); Miss World 1958 (Winner)

Penelope Anne Coelen (born 15 April 1940) is a South African former actress, model and beauty queen who won Miss World 1958. She was the second major international titleholder to come from Africa.

== Early life ==
Penelope Anne Coelen was from Durban, and attended Durban Girls' High School.

== Career ==
In the 1958 Miss World pageant, a total of 22 contestants from Europe, the Americas, Asia and Africa competed in the finals. Europeans dominated the semi-finals, but Penelope Anne Coelen, an 18-year-old secretary who played piano in the talent competition, was selected for the crown.

She gained widespread international attention during her reign and received several lucrative modelling offers. The South African designer of her gowns, Bertha Pfister, also gained increased attention.

After her reign as Miss World 1958, she tried her luck out in Hollywood with the help of James Garner, but failed her screen test. She later managed her own line of clothing and endorsed beauty products, particularly perfumes. She appeared as a contestant on the television game show To Tell the Truth on 25 November 1958. She celebrated the 2014 Miss World win of South Africa's Rolene Strauss, and gave public appearances with the younger woman.

== Personal life ==
Coelen returned to South Africa, and married wealthy sugarcane farmer Michel "Micky" Rey from the Natal Province. They raised five sons. She ran a guesthouse, worked as a beauty consultant, and gave lectures. Her son Nicholas Rey died in 2016, twelve years after he was severely injured in a polo accident. The Nicholas Rey Foundation Trust, founded in 2007, is named in his memory. Her husband Micky Rey died in 2019.

Awards and achievements
Preceded by (Finland) Marita Lindahl	Miss World; 1958	Succeeded by (Netherlands) Corine Rottschäfer
Preceded by Adele Kruger	Miss South Africa; 1958	Succeeded by Moya Meaker
