= Basetsana Kumalo =

South African TV personality (born 1970)

Basetsana Khumalo
- Born: Basetsana Julia Makgalemele; 29 March 1974 (age 52); Soweto, South Africa
- Spouse: Romeo Kumalo (m. 2000)
- Children: 3
- Beauty pageant titleholder
- Title: Miss South Africa 1994
- Hair color: Black
- Eye color: Brown
- Major competitions: Miss World 1994 (1st runner-up)
- Website: www.basetsanakumalo.com

Basetsana Julia "Bassie" Khumalo (née Makgalemele; born 29 March 1974) is a South African television personality, beauty pageant titleholder, businesswoman, and philanthropist. Her career began in 1990 after being crowned Miss Soweto and Miss Black South Africa at the age of 16. She was crowned Miss South Africa in 1994 and in the same year became the first runner-up in Miss World.

== Early life and education ==
Kumalo was born in Soweto, South Africa. She and her two sisters (one of them is Johanna Makgalemele) and brother spent their early years helping to keep the family afloat, making sandwiches to sell at soccer matches every weekend. She attended Thabisang Primary School in Orlando West. When Soweto was engulfed by student unrest in 1986 she was then sent to Trinity Secondary School where she completed her matric. She was then enrolled for tertiary education at the University of Venda, and majored in an Education.

== Personal life ==
Before and during her reign as Miss South Africa, Kumalo dated boxer Dingaan Thobela.

She met her husband Romeo Kumalo, a Vodacom executive and former broadcaster, at the time she was crowned Miss Soweto. They started dating in 1997 and married in 2000. In 2004 Kumalo gave birth to their first child, a boy named Nkosinathi Gabriel. A second son, Shaka Kgositsile Emmanuel, was born in 2012.

Kumalo and her husband Romeo have launched the Romeo & Basetsana Kumalo Family Foundation, which will develop children, specifically those orphaned by AIDS and other related diseases. In 2009 the foundation received the Inyathelo Philanthropy Merit Award. Kumalo joined actress Salma Hayek in the bid to eradicate neonatal and maternal tetanus in the world, as spokesman for the United Nations Children’s Fund and nappy brand Pamper’s campaign to save more than 250 million infants by 2012.

== Career ==
=== Pageantry ===
During 1990 and 1991, Kumalo was crowned Miss Soweto at the age of 16. Kumalo left school planning to follow in her mother's footsteps as a teacher, but it was while before she was enrolled at the University of Venda to study education. Her mother entered her into Miss South Africa pageant that Kumalo went on to win.

=== Television ===
While reigning Miss South Africa, she started presenting the lifestyle television programme Top Billing. Kumalo formed a partnership with the show's producer, Patience Stevens. Tswelopele Productions was born with Kumalo owning a fifty-percent stake. The company is accredited by Impumelelo as one of South Africa's top 300 empowerment companies. The company's flagship brand is the Top Billing TV show, produced for SABC3. In 1999, Tswelopele merged with Union Alliance Media and listed on the JSE Securities Exchanged SA, making Kumalo one of the youngest black women directors to be part of the mainstream of the South African economy. In recent years, Top Billing's success has brought more projects to the Tswelopele brand, such as the Afrikaans magazine programme Pasella on SABC2 and the Swati youth show Seskohona on SABC1.

In 2001, Basetsane joined Gauteng Travel Academy as a director.

In 2016, she was a guest judge in the final Miss South Africa 2016 beauty pageant, venue in the Carnival City's Big Top Arena, Gauteng, South Africa. Transmitted by television networks M-Net and Mzansi Magic.

=== Television production ===
She is the Executive Chairperson of Tswelopele Productions and has produced through Connect TV and Tswelopele Productions various Television shows such as Top Billing, Pasella, Date My Family, Our Perfect Wedding, Diski Divas, Becoming, Pastor wants a wife, Expresso, Afternoon Express, Saving our Marriage, Please Step In and Utatakho.

=== Business ===
Kumalo is the former President of the Business Women's Association of South Africa. In 2008, Kumalo became a new Tawana shareholder through a transaction with her investment company Pro Direct 189. She also sits on the boards of Unipalm Investment Holdings Vhangana Energy Resources, Tactic Group Limited, SME Financial Holdings Limited, Morongwa Investment Holdings, Seven Falls, Q2 Petroleum and PHAB Holdings.

She is the Spokesperson for Pampers UNICEF Tetanus campaign and part of the UNICEF Influential Women Circle, which consists of a group of some of the country’s most influential businesswomen, united to raise money to help protect the lives of the country’s most vulnerable children. She is also the Chairman of the Businesswomen’s Association of South Africa, Chairman of the Kuhluka Movement and Co-chair of the Council of Social Justice Champions.

=== Philanthropy ===
In 2007, former first lady Graça Machel, a champion of the Each One Reach Five campaign, nominated Kumalo to be one of her five volunteers to take a public HIV test. She has also raised money for Baragwanath Children's Hospital with Dr. Precious Moloi-Motsepe. Kumalo also volunteered with Agang Sechaba, a project that was started in 2007 by Nomsa Ntshingila, directed at giving back to the townships in which they were born.

=== Bassie brand ===
In 2000, Kumalo launched her own clothing range under the label Stature Ladies wear by Bassie, distributed by Ackerman’s department stores across 240 outlets throughout Sub-Saharan Africa.

In 2002, under the Bassie brand, Kumalo launched an eyewear range, distributed through Torga Optical. She followed this by launching the Bassie Red cosmetics textrange into 100 Foschini stores nationwide, followed with the Bassie Gold range in 2006.

=== Publishing ===
In 2004, Kumalo contributed to the book Inspirational Women at Work, which focuses on the new face of leadership in the country. Kumalo features on Recipes from the Heart with 36 of South Africa's most-loved celebrities.

She is the editor-at-large of the Top Billing magazine. During her reign, Kumalo was Beauty Editor for DRUM magazine.

In 2020, she published her book Bassie: My Journey of Hope. The novel has sold over 15,000 copies to date.

=== Radio ===
Kumalo had a stint on Metro FM, when she hosted the Breakfast show on 10 August 2006.

== Endorsements ==
Her exposure was further enhanced when she was chosen to be the face of Revlon Realistic Hair Care range for both Sub-Saharan Africa and the international market. She was a Revlon spokesperson for over five years. Kumalo briefly endorsed the BriteSmile procedure by appearing on their website.

== Bibliography ==
- Bassie: My Journey of Hope by Basetsana Kumalo (Penguin Books, 2020) ISBN 978-1-77609-481-3

== Awards and recognition ==
In 1994, she received an honorary scholarship for Overseas Studies from Nelson Mandela.

In 2002 and 2003, she was voted by the Sunday Times and Elle Magazine in the TV Style Awards as the most stylish female magazine/entertainment show host.

In 2004, Kumalo was voted 74th on the list of 100 Greatest South Africans in 2004, the only Miss South Africa in the list.

In 2006, Cape Town Fashion Festival gave Kumalo the Fashion Icon Award. Femina Magazine nominated her as one of the top 10 most glamorous women in South Africa.

Kumalo is also the recipient of the Annual Rapport/City Press Prestige Awards.

In 2011, she honoured as a Young Global Leader by the World Economic Forum.

In 2019, she was awarded most stylish icon at the South African Style Awards.

In October 2021, she was honoured with an Iconic Award by Tastic rice for being the most influential women in the media space in Cape Town.

Awards and achievements
Preceded by (South Africa) Palesa Mofokeng	Miss World Africa; 1994	Succeeded by (South Africa) Bernelee Daniell
Preceded by (South Africa) Palesa Mofokeng	Miss World 1st Runner-Up; 1994	Succeeded by (Croatia) Anica Martinović
