= Bokang Montjane =

South African beauty pageant titleholder

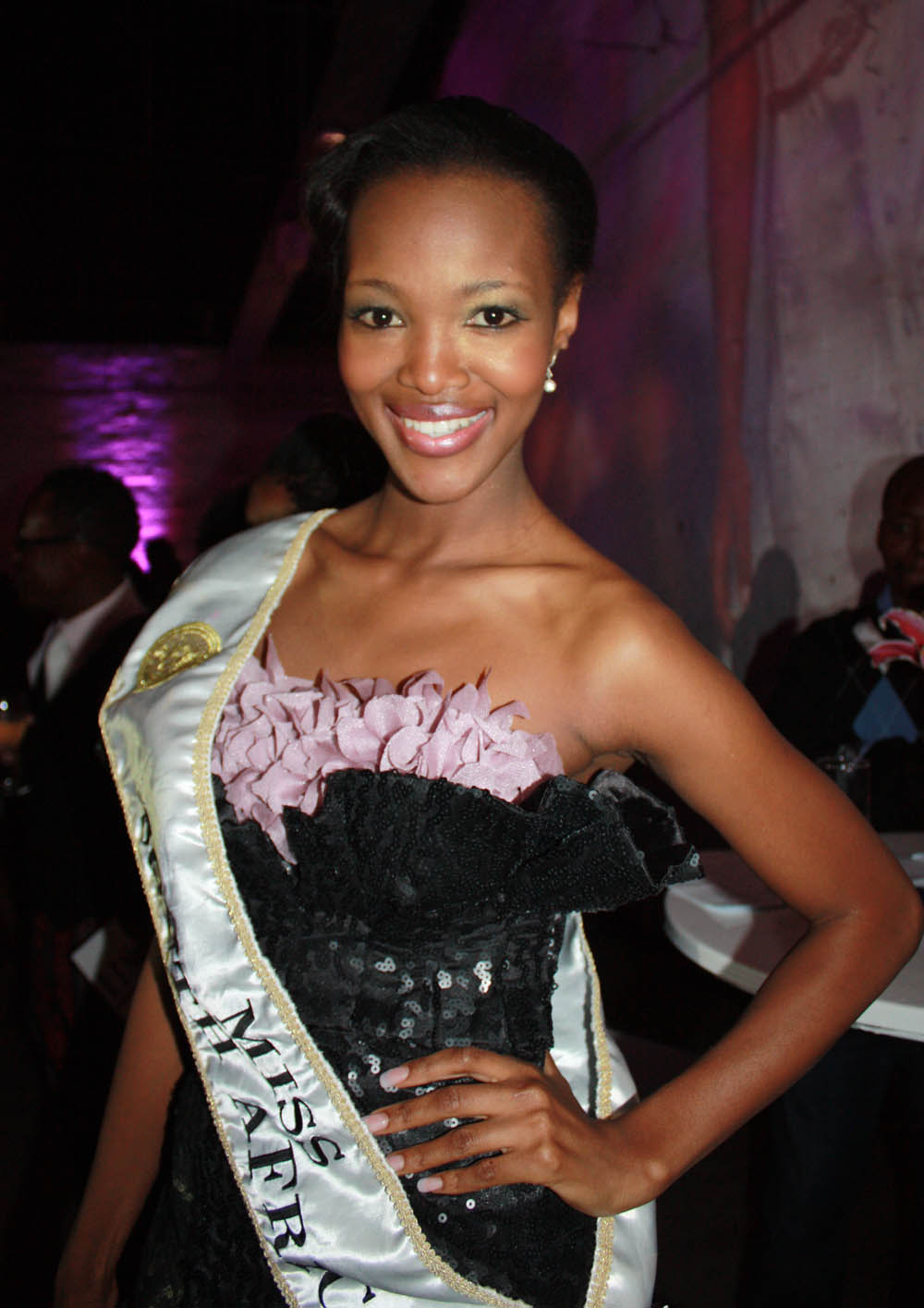
- Montjane at Sansui Summer Cup 2011
- Born: Bokang Montjane; 30 April 1986 (age 40); Ga-Mphahlele, Transvaal (now Limpopo), South Africa
- Height: 1.75 m (5 ft 9 in)
- Spouse: Siphiwe Tshabalala (m. 2016)
- Children: 2
- Beauty pageant titleholder
- Title: Miss South Africa 2010; Miss World Africa 2011
- Major competitions: Miss Earth 2007 (Top 16); Miss International 2009 (Unplaced); Miss South Africa 2010 (Winner); Miss Universe 2011 (Unplaced); Miss World 2011 (Top 7) (Miss World Africa)

Bokang Montjane (born 5 May 1986) is a South African model and beauty pageant titleholder who was crowned Miss South Africa 2010, becoming the official representative of her country to the Miss Universe 2011 and Miss World 2011 pageants. She also participated in Miss International 2009 and placed in the Top 16 at Miss Earth 2007, finished as one of the Top 7 finalists and named Miss World Africa at Miss World 2011. In May of 2025, she created African Beauty International, a new pageant organization in South Africa. Additionally, she is the National Director for the Miss Universe South Africa, Miss World South Africa, and Miss Supranational South Africa.

== Early life ==
Montjane was born and raised in the village of Ga-Mphahlele in Limpopo Province. Prior to competing in Miss South Africa, Montjane participated in Miss Earth 2007 held in Quezon City, where she obtained the Beauty for a Cause award and placed as one of the Top 16 semifinalists of the competition. Two years later, she competed in Miss International 2009, in Chengdu, China.

== Miss South Africa ==
Montjane, who stands 1.75 m (5 ft 9 in) tall, competed as one of 12 finalists in her country's national beauty pageant, Miss South Africa, held in Sun City on 12 December 2010, where she became the eventual winner of the title, gaining the right to represent South Africa in Miss Universe 2011 and Miss World 2011. She was the second African woman to compete in all Big Four pageants, after Cynthia Kanema of Zambia.

Montjane spoke to young people at the YCAP Nationals in 2019 to encourage them to engage and help within their own communities. She said: "You need to understand that when the time comes and you're in a position to make a difference, it's not about you. You are blessed to be a blessing. You guys are here, because you have answers to the problems that are taking place in your communities for a reason: because you're able and you're capable."

Awards and achievements
Preceded by Nicole Flint	Miss South Africa; 2010	Succeeded by Melinda Bam
