= Tatum Keshwar =

South African fashion model, psychologist (born 1983)

- Born: Tatum Keshwar; 14 December 1983 (age 42); Durban, South Africa
- Height: 5 ft 11 in (180 cm)
- Beauty pageant titleholder
- Title: Miss South Africa 2008
- Agency: GAPA Model Agency
- Hair color: Black
- Eye color: Brown
- Major competitions: Miss South Africa 2008 (Winner); Miss Universe 2009 (Top 10); Miss World 2009 (2nd Runner-Up) (Miss World Africa)

Tatum Keshwar (born 14 December 1983) is a South African fashion model, psychologist and beauty pageant titleholder who was crowned Miss South Africa 2008. She represented South Africa at Miss Universe 2009 and placed in the top 10. Keshwar also represented South Africa at Miss World 2009 and placed second runner-up.

== Biography ==
Born in Durban, Keshwar attended Mowat Park Girls High and received a degree in psychology from the University of KwaZulu-Natal. She was a finalist in the third period of the reality modeling contest Revlon Supermodel in 2007 prior to winning Miss South Africa on 15 December 2008.

=== Miss Universe 2009 ===
Keshwar represented her country in Miss Universe 2009 in Nassau, Bahamas where she made the finals and placed seventh overall.

=== Miss World 2009 ===
Keshwar placed among the top 12 at the Miss World Top Model fast-track event and became one of the Top 3 finalists during Miss World 2009 held on 12 December 2009 in Johannesburg, South Africa. Out of the seven delegates who competed at both Miss Universe and Miss World, Keshwar and Chloé Mortaud of France were the only two who placed in the semifinals in both competitions. Keshwar, who ranked one position lower than Mortaud at the Miss Universe pageant earlier that year, finished higher than her French counterpart, being named Queen of Africa and crowned second princess at the finale.

== Personal life ==
In 2013, rumors mistakenly linked Tatum Keshwar to Duduzane Zuma, son of Jacob Zuma. In reality, Tatum is married to businessman Warren Wheatley, and together they have a son. Tatum is also a qualified psychologist, holding a degree from the University of KwaZulu-Natal.

Awards and achievements
Preceded by (Angola) Brigith dos Santos	Miss World Africa; 2009	Succeeded by (Botswana) Emma Wareus
Preceded by (Trinidad and Tobago) Gabrielle Walcott	Miss World (2nd Runner-Up); 2008	Succeeded by (Venezuela) Adriana Vasini
