= List of University of Pretoria alumni =

The University of Pretoria is a public university in Pretoria, the administrative and de facto capital of South Africa. The university in its more than a century of academic service has delivered more than 200,000 alumni. Below is a list of prominent alumni.

== Authors and academics ==
- Prof Tshilidzi Marwala: academic, engineer
- Paul Moorcraft: author, BBC commentator
- Prof Pierre de Villiers Pienaar: author and pioneer of speech therapy in South Africa
- Prof Calie Pistorius: Vice-Chancellor of the University of Pretoria, 2001–2009
- Professor Fransjohan Pretorius: historian of the Second Anglo-Boer War (1899–1902)
- Prof Saurabh Sinha: academic, engineer, author and executive dean
- Prof Bettine van Vuuren, zoologist
- Dr Ruth Murambadoro, political scientist and African feminist scholar

== Arts and entertainment ==
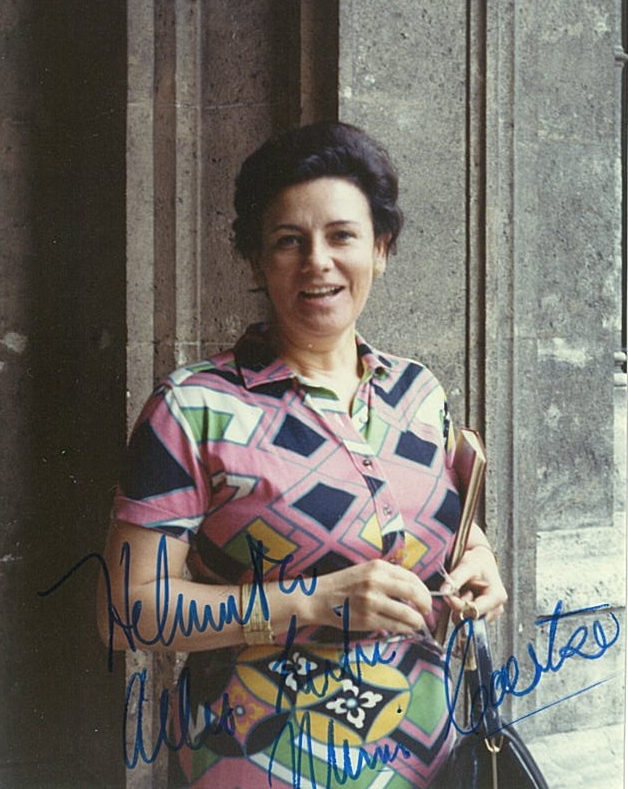
Mimi Coertse in Vienna

- Jana Cilliers: actress
- Bettie Cilliers-Barnard: fine artist
- Dr Mimi Coertse: opera singer
- Ampie du Preez: actor
- Tsakane Valentine Maswanganyi
- Focalistic: South African Rapper and Amapiano artist
- Sandra Prinsloo: actress
- Amanda Strydom: actress
- Brümilda van Rensburg: actress
- Verna Vels: voice artist, television director
- Carrol Boyes: artist and businesswoman

== Sport personalities ==
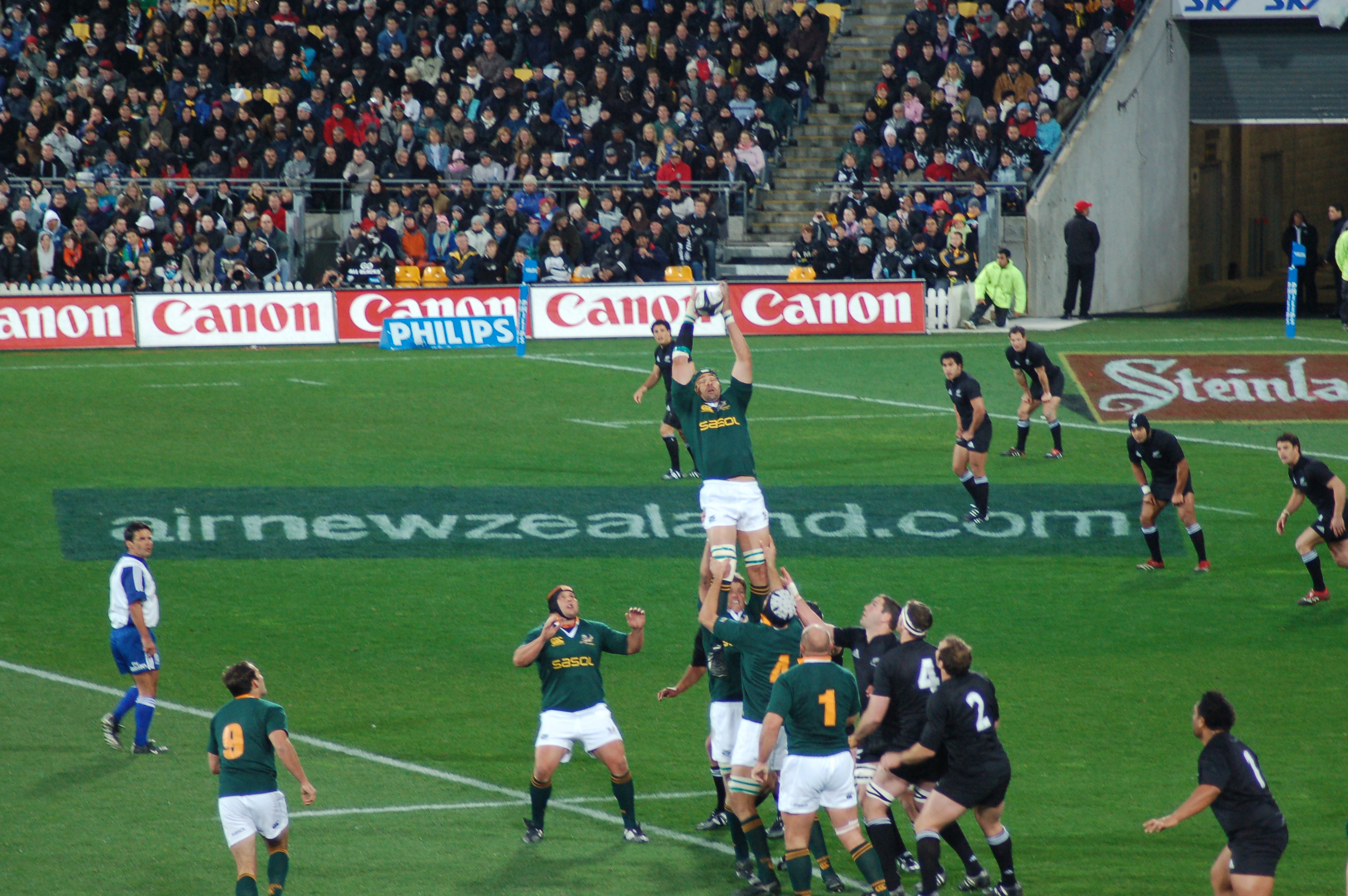
Victor Matfield wins a line-out for South Africa.

Springbok captains:

- Naas Botha
- Wynand Claassen
- Victor Matfield
- Joost van der Westhuizen

Other Springboks:

- Gary Botha
- Fanie de Villiers
- Ernst Dinkelmann
- Heyneke Meyer
- Wynand Olivier
- Danie Rossouw
- Pierre Spies
- Jesse Kriel

Other rugby internationals:

- Duhan van der Merwe (represents Scotland)

MMA:

- Dricus du Plessis

== Business leaders and entrepreneurs ==
- Dr Willem Barnard: CEO, KWV
- Laurie Dippenaar: FirstRand Bank Chairman
- Dr Marius Kloppers: international CEO of global mining giant BHP Billitoni
- Daniel Snzile Ndima, biotechnology entrepreneur
- Dr Anton Rupert: billionaire, former UP chancellor and Tukkie of the Century
- Dr Chris Stals: business leader; former UP chancellor
- Giam Swiegers: CEO of Deloitte Australia
- Elon Musk, a founder, CEO or both of all of: PayPal, SpaceX, Tesla, OpenAI, The Boring Company and Neuralink.
- Stefan J.M. Swanepoel American business executive, author, and real estate strategist.

== Law ==
- Geraldine Fraser-Moleketi: former Minister of Public Service and Administration
- Prof Christof Heyns: United Nations Human Rights Council; Special Rapporteur on extrajudicial, summary or arbitrary executions
- Judge Johann Kriegler
- Frans Lourens Herman Rumpff, Chief Justice of South Africa
- Judge Johann van der Westhuizen: Constitution Court
- Prof. Kithure A. Kindiki, former Tharaka-Nithi senator, Cabinet Secretary of Interior and National Administration of Kenya.

== Health and medicine ==
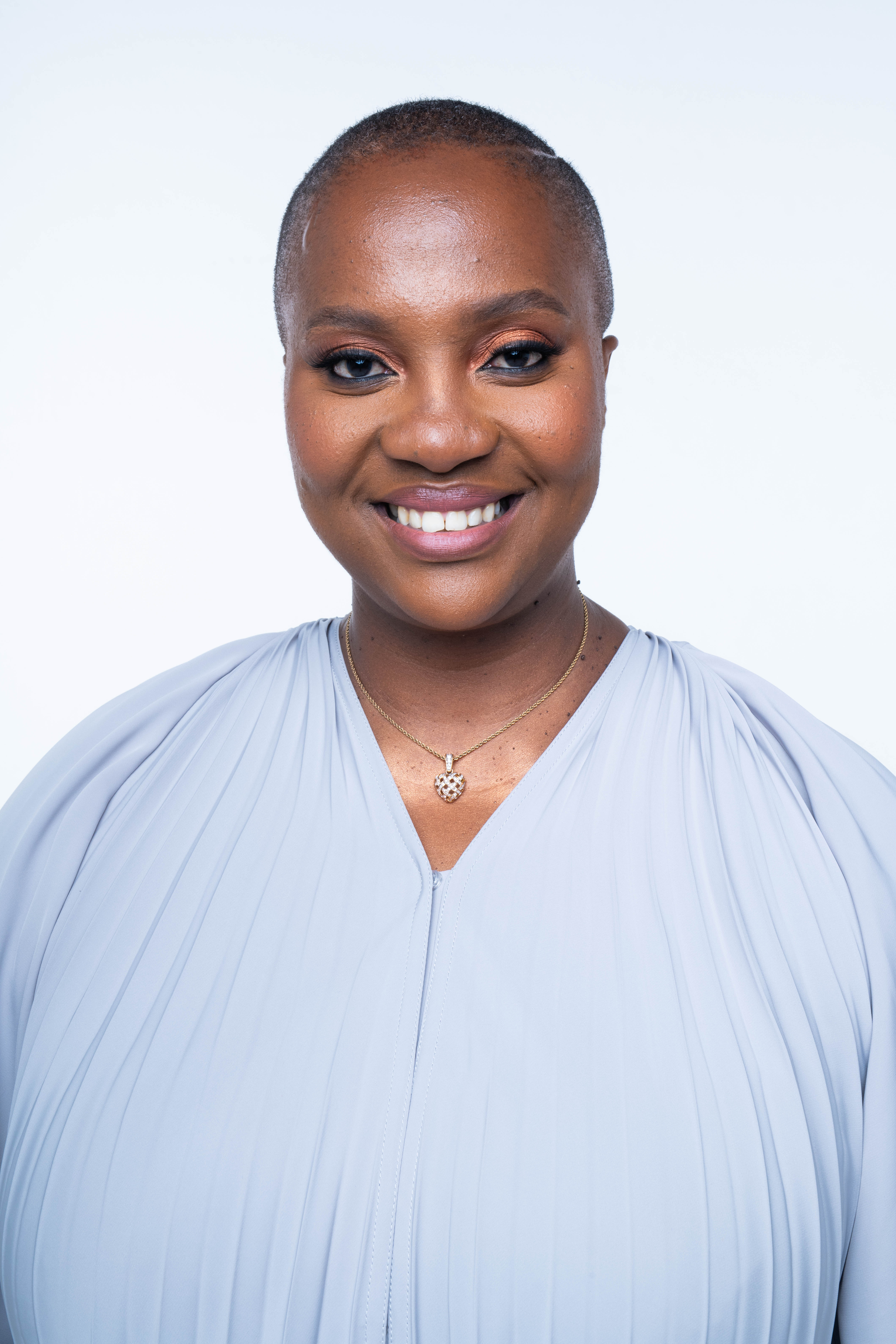
Dr Doreen Sindisiwe van Zyl

- Dr Sindisiwe van Zyl, physician, radio DJ, columnist, health activist and researcher
- Prof Flavia Senkubuge, physician, professor of public health medicine, past president of the Colleges of Medicine of South Africa

== Theologians, welfare, psychology ==
- Michael Licona
- Archbishop Desmond Tutu: social rights activist; winner of Nobel Peace Prize
- Dr. Toyin Ajao – Scholar and founder of Ìmọ́lẹ̀ of Afrika Centre, focused on restorative healing of intergenerational trauma

== Others ==
- Etienne de Villiers: executive chairperson and president, ATP Tennis
- Elizabeth Voigt: late director of the McGregor Museum, Kimberley
- Naledi Chirwa: EFF Member of Parliament
- Shudufhadzo Musida: Miss South Africa 2020
- Lalela Mswane: Miss South Africa 2021 & Miss Supranational 2022
- Ndavi Nokeri: Miss South Africa 2022
