= Natasha Joubert =

South African model and beauty queen

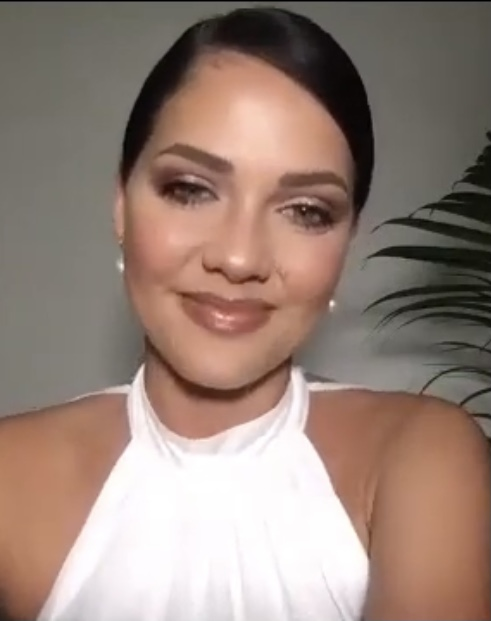
- Joubert at Miss Universe 2020 competition
- Born: Natasha Joubert; 23 July 1997 (age 29); Pretoria, Gauteng, South Africa
- Education: Boston City Campus and Business College
- Height: 1.71 m (5 ft 7 in)
- Beauty pageant titleholder
- Title: Miss Globe South Africa 2016; Miss Universe South Africa 2020; Miss South Africa 2023
- Hair color: Brown
- Eye color: Green
- Major competitions: The Miss Globe 2016; (4th Runner-up); Miss South Africa 2020; (2nd Runner-Up); Miss Universe South Africa; (Winner); Miss Universe 2020; (Unplaced); Miss South Africa 2023; (Winner)

Natasha Joubert (born 24 July 1997) is a South African beauty pageant titleholder who was crowned Miss South Africa 2023. She was previously the second runner-up in Miss South Africa 2020 and later represented South Africa at the Miss Universe 2020 pageant.

== Life and career ==
Joubert was born on 23 July 1997 in Pretoria. Her father died when Joubert was a teenager, while her mother, Ninette, was a final year Bachelor of Laws student at the time of Joubert competing in Miss South Africa 2020. She is the youngest of three siblings.

Joubert was raised in Centurion, Gauteng, and attended Hoërskool Eldoraigne. Afterwards she enrolled in Boston City Campus and Business College, and received a Bachelor of Commerce degree in marketing management in 2020. Prior to Miss South Africa 2020, Joubert worked as a public relations officer for a law firm and was also the founder and owner of the fashion design company Natalia Jefferys.

Joubert began her pageantry career in 2016 when she competed in Miss Globe South Africa 2016. She won the title and went on to place in the Top 5 at Miss Globe 2016.

== Pageantry ==
=== Miss Universe 2020 ===
In 2020, Joubert applied to compete in Miss South Africa 2020. On 11 June 2020, it was announced that Joubert had advanced as one of the 35 women selected to participate in further auditions. She later was announced as one of the top fifteen semifinalists on 24 June, and as one of the ten finalists on 5 August.

Joubert competed in the finals of Miss South Africa 2020 on 24 October at The Table Bay Hotel in Cape Town. She ultimately advanced to the top five, and later to the top three. After reaching the top three, she placed as the second runner-up, behind eventual winner Shudufhadzo Musida and first runner-up Thato Mosehle. On 10 December, it was announced that Joubert had been designated by the Miss South Africa Organisation to serve as Miss Universe South Africa 2020. She represented South Africa at Miss Universe 2020, but did not place in the top 21.

=== Miss South Africa 2023 ===
In May 2023, Joubert's return to pageantry was confirmed, after she was announced as one of the 30 semifinalists for Miss South Africa 2023. She later was selected as one of the 12 finalists for the Crown Chasers reality show, which determined the seven contestants who would compete in the final of Miss South Africa 2023. In Crown Chasers, Joubert was included in the top three during all five episodes, including being selected as the episode winner for three episodes, and advanced to the televised final as one of the seven finalists.

The final was held on 13 August, where Joubert advanced into the top five, top three, and top two, before ultimately being crowned the winner. In an interview after her coronation night, Joubert said that she would not compete internationally representing South Africa during her reign as she would rather fully serve her country as a Miss South Africa.

In her capacity as Miss South Africa 2023, Joubert travelled to Mauritius, France, Australia and various cities in South Africa.

Awards and achievements
Preceded by Ndavi Nokeri	Miss South Africa; 2023	Succeeded by Mia le Roux
Preceded by Zozibini Tunzi	South African delegate to Miss Universe; 2020	Succeeded by Lalela Mswane
