= Lebogang Mahlangu =

South African beauty pageant titleholder (born 1997)

- Born: Lebogang Mahlangu; 1 April 1997 (age 29); Soshanguve, Gauteng, South Africa
- Education: Stellenbosch University
- Occupations: Model; food scientist
- Height: 1.75 m (5 ft 9 in)
- Beauty pageant titleholder
- Title: Miss Mamelodi Sundowns Western Cape 2018
- Major competitions: Miss Mamelodi Sundowns Western Cape 2018; (Winner); Miss Mamelodi Sundowns 2018; (2nd Runner-Up); Miss South Africa 2020; (Top 5); Miss South Africa 2022; (2nd Runner-Up)

Lebogang Mahlangu (born 1 April 1997) is a South African food scientist and beauty pageant titleholder who was crowned the winner of Miss Mamelodi Sundowns Western Cape 2018.

== Pageantry ==
Mahlangu began her pageantry career in 2018 where was crowned the winner of Miss Mamelodi Sundowns Western Cape 2018, represented by Mamelodi Sundowns F.C. and later crowned the 2nd Runner-Up of Miss Mamelodi Sundowns 2018. In 2020, she entered the Miss South Africa 2020 and was placed in the top 5.

=== Miss South Africa 2022 ===
In 2022, she returned for the Miss South Africa competition in the Miss South Africa 2022 held in SunBet Arena in Pretoria, South, and was crowned the 2nd Runner-Up, while Ndavi Nokeri was the winner and Ayanda Gugulethu Thabethe the 1st Runner-up.

Awards and achievements
Preceded by Tshidi Green	Miss Mamelodi Sundowns; 2018	Succeeded by Sihle Mdekazi and Trudy Rene Barros
