= Nelson Mandela Centre of Memory =

Building in Johannesburg, South Africa

Nelson Mandela Centre for Memory
- Travel diary from the Rivonia Trial
- Location: South Africa
- Coordinates: 26°08′55″S 28°03′30″E
- Curator: Verne Harris
- Website: www.nelsonmandela.org/about-the-centre-of-memory1
- Location of Nelson Mandela Centre of Memory

The Nelson Mandela Centre of Memory is a place dedicated to keeping the memory and the legacy of Nelson Mandela alive. The centre is run by The Nelson Mandela Foundation (NMF), and is located in Houghton. The NMF was set up in 1999, the Centre of Memory was constructed in 2002, dedicated by Nelson Mandela in 2004, worked with Google to launch a $1.25 million (€940,000) digital archive in 2012, and launched a physical exhibition spaces for the general public in 2013/2014. The NMF foundation aims to create a living legacy to Madiba with this Centre of Memory.
