= Zhu Ling =

Zhu Ling (Wade–Giles: Chu Ling) is the name of the following Chinese people:

- Zhu Ling (Three Kingdoms) (朱靈; fl.180-228), general of Cao Wei during the Three Kingdoms period
- Zhu Ling (economist) (朱玲; born 1951), Chinese economist
- Zhu Ling (volleyball) (朱玲; born 1957), Chinese volleyball player
- Zhu Ling (poisoning victim) (朱令; 1973-2023), victim of a thallium poisoning incident
- Zhu Ling (China Daily), Editor in Chief of China Daily

== See also ==
- Yuan Chiung-chiung (born 1950), Taiwanese writer who used the pen name Zhu Ling (朱陵)
