= Verne Harris =

Archivist for Nelson Mandela's papers

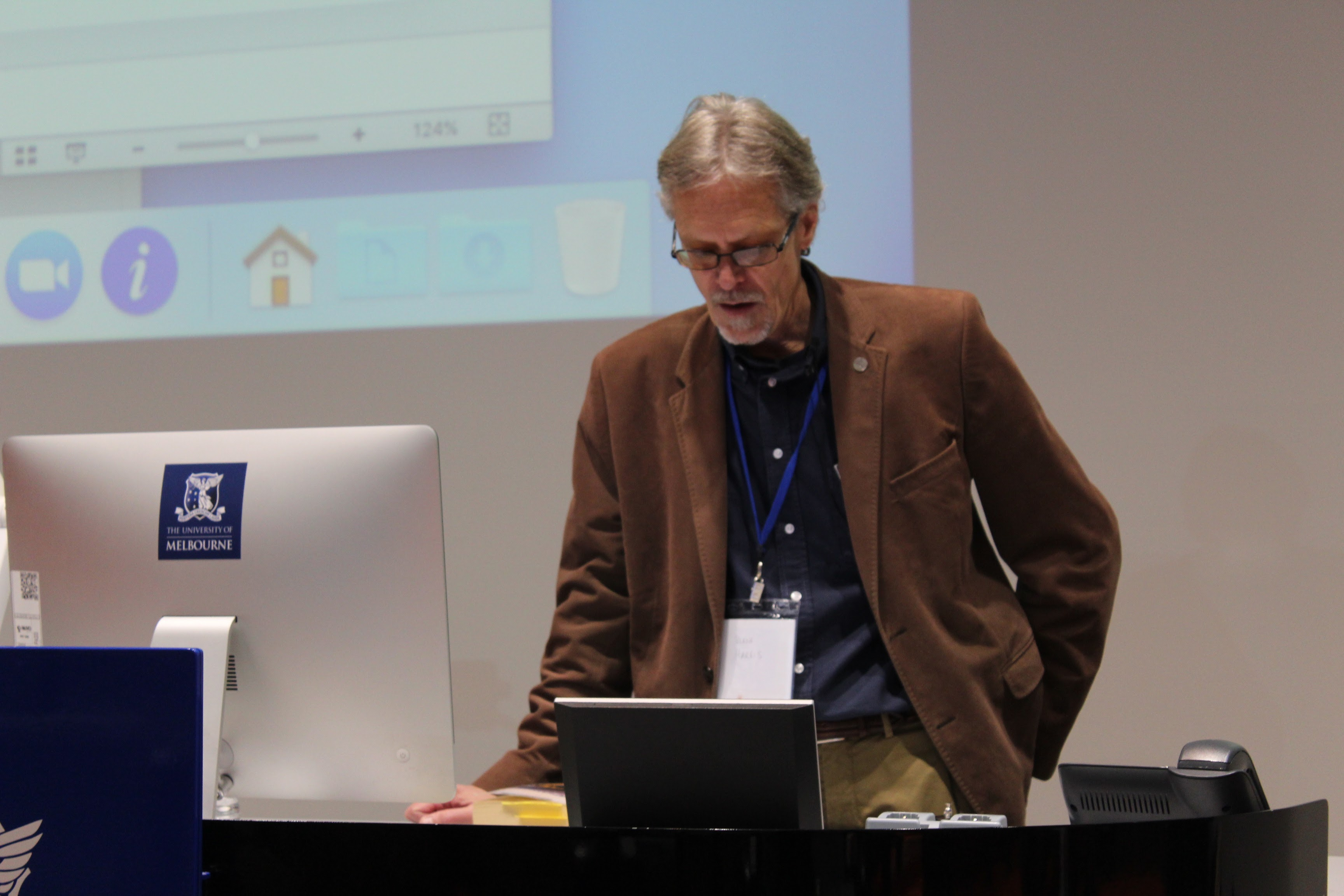
Harris delivering the opening keynote address, at the Australian Society of Archivists' 2017 conference

Verne Harris has been the archivist for the papers of Nelson Mandela since 2004, as Head of the Memory Programme at the Nelson Mandela Foundation’s Centre of Memory and Dialogue.

Before that, he had worked for South Africa's Truth and Reconciliation Commission and was the Director of the South African History Archive (SAHA). From 1985 until 2001 he was an archivist with South Africa's State Archives Service and, beginning in 1997, the newly established National Archives of South Africa; he served as deputy director from 1993 to 2001.
