= Richards Bay =

Richards Bay Richardsbaai Mhlathuze Lagoon (former name)
- Town
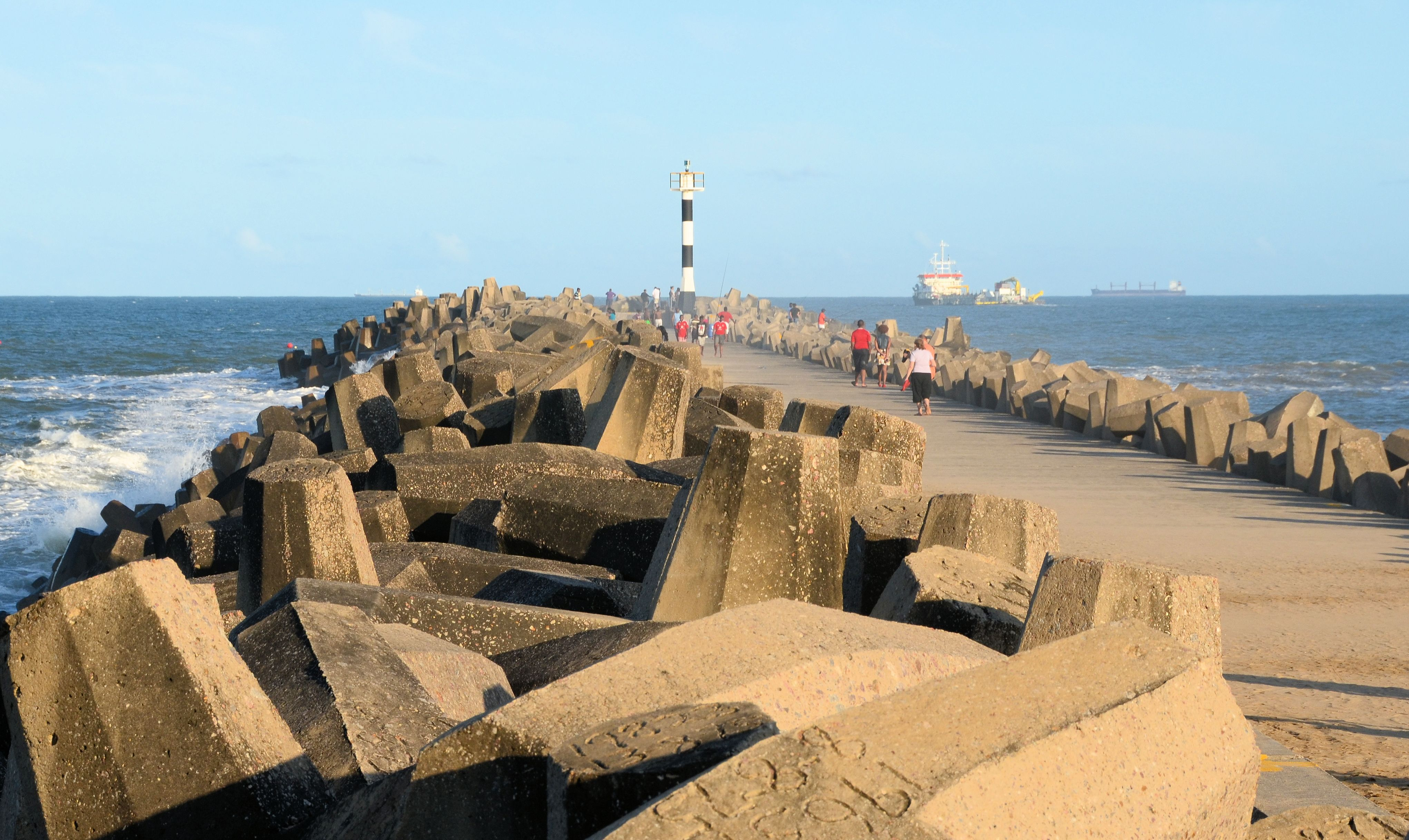
- Richard's Bay Northern Breakwater

- Location within KwaZulu-Natal Location within South Africa Location within Africa
- Coordinates: 28°46′10″S 32°03′34″E
- Country: South Africa
- Province: KwaZulu-Natal
- District: King Cetshwayo
- Municipality: uMhlathuze
- Established: 1969

Area
  - Total: 142.78 km^{2} (55.13 sq mi)

Population (2022)
  - Total: 57,387
  - Density: 401.93/km^{2} (1,041.0/sq mi)

Racial makeup (2022)
  - Black African: 38.0%
  - White: 31.1%
  - Indian/Asian: 19.2%
  - Coloured: 8.2%
  - Other: 0.4%

First languages (2022)
  - Zulu: 38.6%
  - English: 33.8%
  - Afrikaans: 31.5%
  - Other: 2.1%
- Time zone: UTC+2 (SAST)
- Postal code (street): 3900
- PO box: 3900
- Area code: 035

Richards Bay (Afrikaans: Richardsbaai) is a city in KwaZulu-Natal, South Africa. It is situated on a 30-square-kilometre lagoon of the Mhlatuze River, which makes it one of the country's largest harbours. Richards Bay also has the deepest natural harbour on the African continent.

== History ==
The town began as a makeshift harbour that was set up by Commodore of the Cape, Sir Markus Eugene Brown, during the Anglo-Zulu War of 1879. In 1902, Cathcart Methven, the harbour engineer for the Natal Government, in his Zululand Port Survey recognized the potential of Richards Bay as a new harbour for the eastern shore.

In 1935 the Richards Bay Game Sanctuary was created to protect the ecology around the lagoon and by 1943 it expanded into Richards Bay Park. The town was laid out on the shores of the lagoon in 1954 and proclaimed a town in 1969.

In 1965, the South African Government under Minister of Transport Ben Schoeman decided to build a deep water harbour at Richards Bay. Construction work began in 1972 and lasted four years. In January 1976, there was a forced removal of local inhabitants of the Mthiyane Zulu clan. On 1 April 1976, the new deep water harbour was opened with a railway and an oil/gas pipeline linking the port to Johannesburg. The new residential area for Richards Bay was developed north of the harbour. Meerensee, started in 1970, was the first suburb. It was followed by Arboretum in 1975, and Veldenvlei in 1980.

All three suburbs catered exclusively for whites by the existing laws of Apartheid. A township for blacks was developed at Esikhaweni, fifteen kilometres south of Richards Bay. Residential areas for Indians and coloureds (Brackenham and Aquadene) were opened after 1985 west of Veldenvlei. The three suburbs of Richards Bay (excluding the black township of Esikhaweni) had a combined population of about 20,000 in 1990.

== Economy ==
The Port of Richards Bay contains what was once the largest coal export facility in the world, with a planned capacity of 91 million tons per year by the first half of 2009. In 2007 annual throughput was 66.12 million tons. The Australian port of Newcastle, New South Wales is the largest coal-exporting harbour in the world, exporting just over 161 million tonnes of coal in 2016.

Two aluminium smelters, Hillside Aluminum and Bayside Aluminium are operated by South32. A fertiliser plant operated by Foskor has been erected at the harbour. Iron ore, rutile (titanium oxide) and zircon are mined from the dunes close to the lagoon by Richards Bay Minerals, part of the Rio Tinto Group. Local exports include coal, aluminium, titanium and other heavy minerals, granite, ferrochrome, paper pulp, wood chips and phosphoric acid. Richards Bay is, alongside Rustenburg, South Africa's fastest-developing city. It is a fast-growing industrial centre that has been able to maintain its ecological diversity.

However, like most of South Africa, the Richards Bay area is plagued by unemployment and poverty. Unemployment has been estimated at forty per cent and an undefined number of people live below the poverty line. The local government have not made enough efforts to implement projects aimed at poverty reduction.

The "John Ross Parkway" (P496) which links Richards Bay to Empangeni and the N2 highway is named after "John Ross" (real name, Charles Rawden Maclean), who at the age of 15 walked from Port Natal to Maputo and back to procure medicine and supplies for the early settlers.

Apart from the mining industry, tourism is a major part of the economy, with Richards Bay seen as a gateway to Zululand, an area popular with foreign tourists because of its large game parks and the diverse wildlife on offer.

The Richards Bay Industrial Development Zone is one of two Industrial Development Zones within the province of KwaZulu-Natal. It is a fully serviced industrial land comprising heavy, medium and light industries linked to the adjacent Port of Richards Bay.

== Government and politics ==
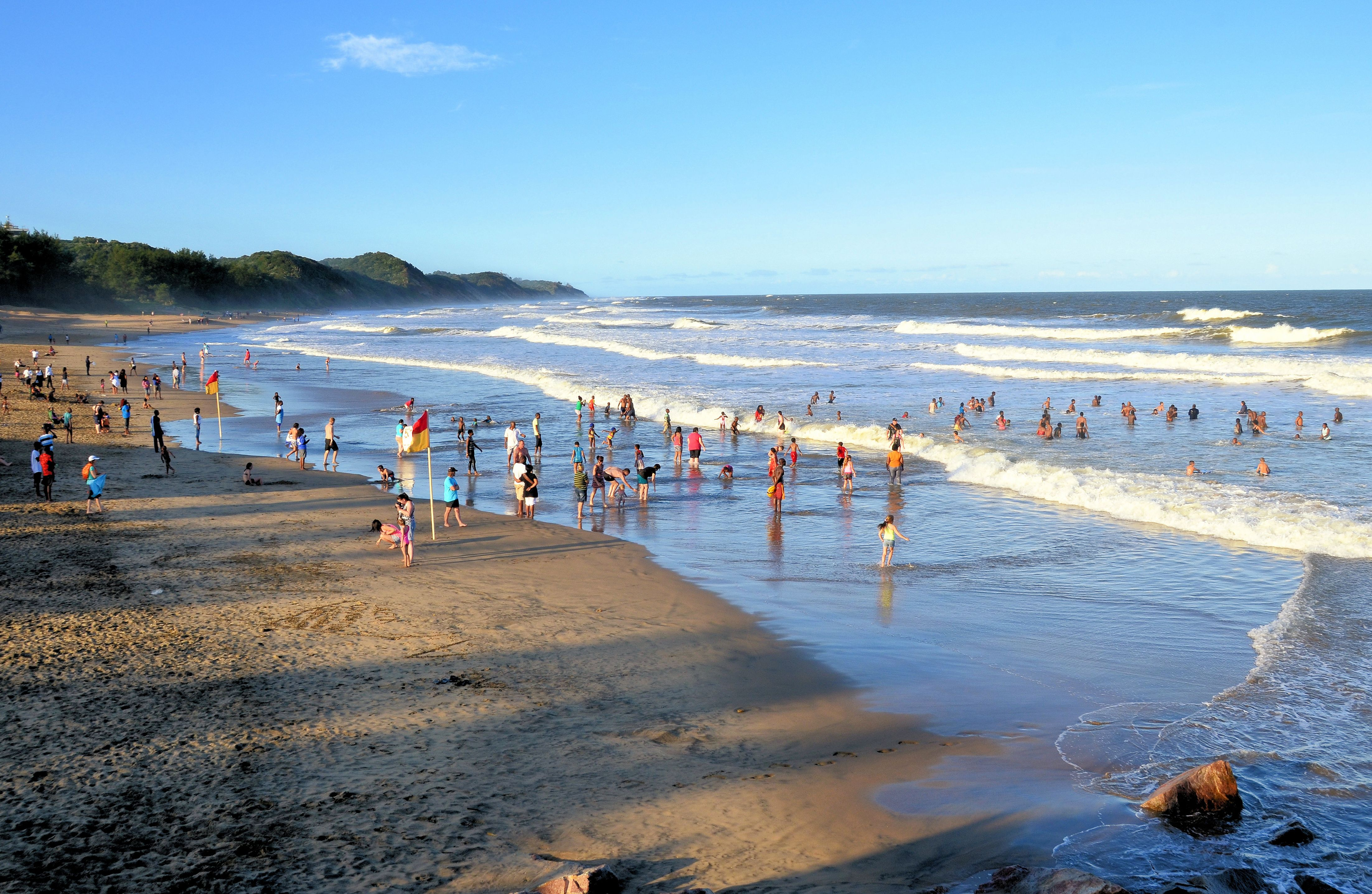
Alkantstrand Beach

Since municipal boundaries were newly demarcated in 2000, the Inkatha Freedom Party (IFP), in a coalition with the Democratic Alliance (DA) and other smaller parties, were in power in the uMhlatuze Municipality. However, due to the final floor crossing period and the formation of the National Freedom Party, the IFP lost control of the Municipality to the ruling African National Congress (ANC). The mayor of uMhlathuze was Mr Mduduzi Mhlongo, who so happened to be the Chairperson of the African National Congress in the region. After the 2021 election, the Inkatha Freedom Party regained its power through a coalition with the Democratic Alliance (DA) with Xolani Ngwezi becoming the new Mayor. uMhlatuze Municipality is under the King Cetshwayo District Municipality, which is also led by the Inkatha Freedom Party, where Thamisanqa Ntuli is the current mayor.

== Demographics ==
White people account for 39.98 per cent of the population, followed by black Africans at 37.05 per cent, Asians or Indians at 19.16 per cent and coloureds at 3.8 per cent. 74.19 per cent of the population is under the age of 34 years, with 2.73 per cent over the age of 65. For every 100 females, there are 93 males. The population density has been estimated to be 526–1,192 persons/km squared. There are 12,433 households in Richards Bay, with 66.4 per cent of such households being house or brick structures. According to household income, the wealthiest suburb is Meerensee, with an average household income of more than R153,601 per annum. The unemployment rate in Richards Bay alone is 19 per cent, compared with 55 per cent in surrounding rural areas.

The various racial makeups of the seven different suburbs are still along the Apartheid-era segregation lines, with Meerensee a mostly white area, while suburbs such as Brackenham and Aquadene are predominantly Indian/Asian and Ngwelezane home to the black community. However, in recent years there has been a movement towards more integration, with predominantly black people moving into other, traditionally higher-income areas, due to the growing black middle-class in the area.

22 per cent of the population have completed school only. A further 8.45 per cent have a tertiary education. 16.7 per cent have received no schooling at all. However, this data reflects the uMhlathuze municipality as a whole.

=== Catholicism ===
The parish priest of Kwambonambi celebrated Mass twice a month in a private home and, starting in 1973, in the Meerensee Primary School. There were few Catholics in Richards Bay in the beginning, but their number increased steadily with the development of the town. The parish priest of Empangeni took over the pastoral care of these Catholics after a new road link between Empangeni and Richards Bay had been completed at the end of 1974. He introduced a weekly Mass, which was held in the Methodist Church in Meerensee and later in the Primary School in Arboretum. The Diocese of Eshowe had in the meanwhile bought a church site in Meerensee. The site was offered to the Nardini Sisters who built a convent and a primary school there in 1977/78. Reg Sommerville, an architect from Empangeni, drew up the plans. O'Connell Brothers, an Empangeni company, began the building operations in June 1977. They finished the first phase within one year so that Archabbot Notker Wolf of St. Ottilien (Germany), who was at that time in South Africa on a visit, could bless the chapel and kindergarten on 12 August 1978. The second phase which involved the construction of a convent was completed in January 1979. Two Nardini Sisters took up residence in the new convent in February 1979. The convent chapel was used by the Catholic community of Richards Bay for Sunday Mass from June 1978 until August 1986 when the new church in Veld-en-Vlei was opened.

The influx of people to Richards Bay in the early eighties brought about a marked increase in the number of Catholics. This in turn made it necessary to think of building a proper church. Duvenhage and Fischer, architects from Richards Bay, were approached to submit designs. During this planning period, all parishioners were invited to make suggestions for the new Catholic centre. For months the sketches and plans were displayed after Sunday Mass so that everyone could contribute ideas. The Diocese of Eshowe eventually accepted the proposal to build a church together with a hall and a caretaker's flat in Veld en Vlei because of the central position of this suburb. The turning of the sod service took place on 12 September 1985. LTA Construction, one of the largest building companies in South Africa was awarded the contract. Work was completed in June 1986. Bishop Mansuet Biyase consecrated the new church on 31 August 1986. The patron saint of the church and the parish is St. Francis of Assisi. Attached to the church are a sacristy, a small kitchen and a caretaker's flat. In 1992, another building was added. It contains a meeting room and several classrooms for catechism children. The St. Francis Parish in Richards Bay had about 600 Catholics in 1992.

All the additional buildings were constructed and paid for by Father Pious Paul from a legacy left to him. He gave to the Richards Bay Parish a memorial for the benefit of all Catholics in Zululand. After Father Pious several priests ran the parish namely Fathers Alousios, Eugene, Hemmie, Peter Blue, Max and the incumbent Father Bheki.

=== Crime ===
The area experiences high levels of crime with a number of high-profile murders, including that of a ward councillor in 2024. Many crimes are related to procurement and supply chain issues.

== Geography and climate ==
Richards Bay is in a transitional zone between a humid subtropical climate, which characterizes the inland areas, and a tropical savanna climate along the seashore. There are warm wet summers and mild moist to dry frost-free winters. The town has an average annual rainfall of 1228 millimetres (48.3 in). The average annual temperature is 21.5 °C (71 °F), with daytime maxima peaking from January to March at 29 °C (84 °F), and the minimum is 21 °C (70 °F), dropping to daytime highs from June to August of 23 °C (73 °F) and a minimum of 12 °C (53 °F). Sunrise is at 4:45 AM and sunset at 7:00 PM in summer. In winter sunrise is at 6:20 AM and sunset at 5:00 PM. Richards Bay is a popular kitesurfing destination thanks to consistent winds blowing from the North East.

The Richards Bay area is generally very flat and is situated on a coastal plain. The terrain rises slightly towards the west. The suburbs are all no more than a few metres (around 140m, or 459.3 ft) above sea level. The area is abundant in coastal dune forests, most notably along the coastal dune belt and in the suburb of Meerensee.

Climate data for Richards Bay, 1961-1990
Month	Jan	Feb	Mar	Apr	May	Jun	Jul	Aug	Sep	Oct	Nov	Dec	Year
Record high °C (°F)	41 (106)	39 (102)	39 (102)	37 (99)	35 (95)	35 (95)	31 (88)	37 (99)	40 (104)	42 (108)	43 (109)	42 (108)	43 (109)
Mean daily maximum °C (°F)	29 (84)	29 (84)	29 (84)	27 (81)	25 (77)	23 (73)	23 (73)	24 (75)	25 (77)	25 (77)	27 (81)	29 (84)	26 (79)
Daily mean °C (°F)	25 (77)	25 (77)	24.5 (76.1)	22.5 (72.5)	21 (70)	17.5 (63.5)	17.5 (63.5)	19 (66)	20.5 (68.9)	21 (70)	23 (73)	24.5 (76.1)	21.8 (71.1)
Mean daily minimum °C (°F)	21 (70)	21 (70)	20 (68)	18 (64)	15 (59)	12 (54)	12 (54)	14 (57)	16 (61)	17 (63)	19 (66)	20 (68)	17 (63)
Record low °C (°F)	11 (52)	13 (55)	14 (57)	8 (46)	7 (45)	6 (43)	4 (39)	5 (41)	6 (43)	10 (50)	11 (52)	13 (55)	4 (39)
Average precipitation mm (inches)	172 (6.8)	167 (6.6)	107 (4.2)	109 (4.3)	109 (4.3)	57 (2.2)	60 (2.4)	65 (2.6)	77 (3.0)	105 (4.1)	114 (4.5)	86 (3.4)	1,228 (48.4)
Average precipitation days	12	12	10	8	7	6	6	7	9	12	13	11	113
Source: Weather SA

== Sports ==
=== 2006/7/8 Richards Bay BG Triathlon World Cup ===
Richards Bay hosted the ITU World Cup. ITU Triathlon World Cup was a series of triathlon races organised by the International Triathlon Union (ITU) for elite-level triathletes. There were twelve races held in twelve countries, each held over a distance of 1500 m swim, 40 km cycle, 10 km run (an Olympic-distance triathlon). Alongside a prize purse, points were awarded at each race contributing towards the overall World Cup for which an additional prize purse was awarded. The 2008 World Cup was sponsored by BG Group. The 2008 World Cup series marked the final year of this race and championship format as the ITU shifted its focus to developing the World Championship Series.

=== 2010 FIFA World Cup ===
Due to its regional airport, its proximity to Durban (3-hour drive) and its status as the gateway to Zululand, Richards Bay was identified as a possible training base for the World Cup. A small stadium aimed at achieving FIFA accreditation was developed. In late 2009, a Ghana delegation visited the town, raising speculation that the Ghana football team could base themselves in the town. In May 2010, it was announced that the Nigeria football team would move their base to Richards Bay for the duration of the World Cup.

=== 2011 South African Surfski Championships ===
Zululand Kayak Club, Richards Bay, was nominated by Kwazulu Natal Canoe Union (KNCU) to host the yearly surf ski championship for single and double surf ski formats. This was achieved on 17 and 18 September 2011. This race brought in professional and amateur surf ski racers alike from Durban, East London, Port Elizabeth, Cape Town and Johannesburg. The race was sponsored by Rio Tinto-Richards Bay Minerals and Midbay Motors.

=== 2015 South African Surf Championships ===
In 2015 Richards Bay was selected by the governing body of South African surfing, Surfing South Africa (SSA), to host the South African Surf Championships. South Africa's top provincial surfers gathered to compete at Alkantstrand during the week-long event in August. The contest was handled and coordinated by the local surf club, uThungulu Surfriders (formerly Zululand Surfriders Association).

=== Organisations ===
- Canoe / Surfski: Zululand Kayak Club is a water sports organisation, focused on canoe and surfski paddling, and competing in many races on the KNCU calendar. This is a local club that caters to the Zululand community. the club offers a surf ski school to the community for anyone interested in trying a new sport.
- Cycling: The Zululand Cycling Club is active and can be contacted through the Zululand Cycling Facebook page. (ZCC)
- Surfing: King Cetswayo District Surf Club (formerly uThungulu Surf Riders)
- Wrestling: Richards Bay Wrestling Club is one of the top wrestling clubs in the province of KwaZulu-Natal.
- Football: Richards Bay F.C. is a football club based in the city.

== Notable people ==
- Bridgitte Hartley – Olympic bronze medalist in the Women's K-1 500m Canoeing 2012 Olympic games hosted in London
- Marius Jonker – South African Rugby union match official
- Lindokuhle "Linda" Mkhwanazi – soccer player
- Casimiro Monteiro – Portuguese intelligence officer and assassin for the Portuguese Colonial Police and PIDE (International and State Defense Police). Monteiro retired to Richards Bay.
- Lalela Mswane – Miss South Africa 2021 & Miss Supranational 2022

== Local media ==
- Focus Magazine – a glossy community magazine detailing property and life in and around Richards Bay.
- Zululand Observer – locally operated newspaper founded by Mrs Regina Anthony in 1969 – www.zululandobserver.co.za
- 1KZN TV

== Transport ==
- Port of Richards Bay
- Richards Bay Airport
