= Dr AB Xuma Local Municipality =

Municipal subdistrict in South Africa

Coordinates: 31°40′S 28°00′E

Dr AB Xuma
- Local municipality
- Seal

- Location in the Eastern Cape
- Country: South Africa
- Province: Eastern Cape
- District: Chris Hani
- Seat: Ngcobo
- Wards: 19

Government
  - Type: Municipal council
  - Mayor: (ANC)

Area
  - Total: 2,484 km^{2} (959 sq mi)

Population (2011)
  - Total: 155,513
  - Density: 62.61/km^{2} (162.1/sq mi)

Racial makeup (2011)
  - Black African: 99.6%
  - Coloured: 0.1%
  - Indian/Asian: 0.1%
  - White: 0.1%

First languages (2011)
  - Xhosa: 94.7%
  - English: 2.0%
  - Other: 3.3%
- Time zone: UTC+2 (SAST)
- Municipal code: EC137

Dr AB Xuma Local Municipality (previously Engcobo Municipality) is a local municipality within the Chris Hani District Municipality, in the Eastern Cape province of South Africa. Ngcobo is an isiXhosa word for a sweet grass found in the area.

== Main places ==
The 2001 census divided the municipality into the following main places:

Place	Code	Area (km^{2})	Population
Amantondo	22401	132.82	7,033
Amaqwati	22402	167.65	16,863
Dumalisile	22403	128.98	8,330
Ngcobo	22404	26.55	6,124
Gqutyini	22405	259.73	12,165
Hala	22406	185.31	13,339
Jumba	22407	279.27	16,774
Luhewini	22408	149.02	14,707
Moshi	22409	171.90	11,447
Sidindi	22410	386.90	23,005
Singqumeni	22411	166.64	6,113
Tara	22412	46.35	3,190
Upper Gqobonco	22413	157.67	9,319

== Politics ==
The municipal council consists of thirty-eight members elected by mixed-member proportional representation. Nineteen councillors are elected by first-past-the-post voting in nineteen wards, while the remaining nineteen are chosen from party lists so that the total number of party representatives is proportional to the number of votes received.

In the election of 4 November 2026 the African National Congress (ANC) won a reduced majority of twenty-four seats.

The following table shows the results of the election.

Party	Ward			List			Total seats
Party	Votes	%	Seats	Votes	%	Seats	Total seats
African National Congress	21,505	62.51	19	21,318	62.23	5	24
African Transformation Movement	5,905	17.17	0	5,706	16.66	7	7
Ngcobo Yethu Civic Organization	2,811	8.17	0	3,132	9.14	3	3
Democratic Alliance	1,099	3.19	0	1,146	3.35	1	1
Economic Freedom Fighters	1,002	2.91	0	976	2.85	1	1
African Independent Congress	364	1.06	0	489	1.43	1	1
Pan Africanist Congress of Azania	346	1.01	0	321	0.94	1	1
Independent candidates	233	0.68	0				0
8 other parties	1,136	3.30	0	1,169	3.41	0	0
Total	34,401	100.00	19	34,257	100.00	19	38
Valid votes	34,401	97.87		34,257	97.59		
Invalid/blank votes	748	2.13		846	2.41		
Total votes	35,149	100.00		35,103	100.00		
Registered voters/turnout	77,908	45.12		77,908	45.06		
