= Thato Mosehle =

South African beauty pageant titleholder (born 1995)

- Born: Thato Thelma Mosehle; 6 April 1995 (age 31); Stilfontein, North West, South Africa
- Education: University of the Free State
- Occupations: Model; doctor
- Height: 1.67 m (5 ft 6 in)
- Beauty pageant titleholder
- Title: Miss Supranational South Africa 2021
- Major competitions: Miss South Africa 2020; (1st Runner-Up); Miss Supranational South Africa 2021; (Winner); Miss Supranational 2021; (2nd Runner-up)

Thato Thelma Mosehle (born 6 April 1995) is a South African doctor and beauty pageant titleholder who was crowned Miss Supranational South Africa 2021 and represented South Africa in Poland and was crowned the 2nd Runner-up.

She also participated in Miss South Africa 2020 where she was crowned the 1st Runner-Up.

== Life and career ==
Mosehle was born in Stilfontein, North West, South Africa. She started school at Strathvaal Primary School and completed high school at The High School for Girls Potchefstroom. Thato obtained her Bachelor of Medicine and Bachelor of Surgery (MBChB) degree from the University of the Free State in 2018.

By 2020, Mosehle was completing her internship from Tshepong Hospital in Klerksdorp when entering 62nd edition of Miss South Africa.

== Pageantry ==
=== Miss South Africa 2020 ===
Mosehle first gained national prominence when she competed in Miss South Africa 2020, held on 24 October 2020. She was representing the North West province and she crowned as first runner-up, behind winner Shudufhadzo Musida.

=== Miss Supranational 2021 ===
As first runner-up of Miss South Africa 2020, Mosehle was crowned the Miss Supranational South Africa 2021 under the Miss South Africa Organisation banner. In August 2021, she departed for Poland to take part in the 12th Miss Supranational pageant, held in Nowy Sącz. On the final round, she finished as the 2nd Runner-up of Miss Supranational 2021.

Awards and achievements
Preceded by Leyla van Greuning	Miss Supranational South Africa; 2021	Succeeded by Lalela Mswane
Preceded by (Indonesia) Jesica Fitriana Martasari	Miss Supranational 2nd Runner-Up; 2021	Succeeded by (Vietnam) Nguyễn Huỳnh Kim Duyên
