= Ngcobo =

Ngcobo Engcobo
- Location within Eastern Cape Location within South Africa Location within Africa
- Coordinates: 31°40′30″S 28°00′00″E
- Country: South Africa
- Province: Eastern Cape
- District: Chris Hani
- Municipality: Engcobo

Area
  - Total: 85.76 km^{2} (33.11 sq mi)

Population (2011)
  - Total: 9,835
  - Density: 114.7/km^{2} (297.0/sq mi)

Racial makeup (2011)
  - Black African: 98.6%
  - Coloured: 0.2%
  - Indian/Asian: 0.4%
  - White: 0.3%
  - Other: 0.4%

First languages (2011)
  - Xhosa: 88.6%
  - Afrikaans: 3.9%
  - English: 2.6%
  - Sign language: 2.0%
  - Other: 2.9%
- Time zone: UTC+2 (SAST)
- Postal code (street): 5050
- PO box: 5050
- Area code: 047

Ngcobo, alternatively rendered Engcobo, is a town in the Eastern Cape province of South Africa.

Ngcobo is the main town of the Engcobo Local Municipality, which falls within the Chris Hani District Municipality of the Eastern Cape. It is situated in the western part of the former bantustan of Transkei. Ngcobo is along R61 surrounded by the towns of Cofimvaba, Dutywa, Mthatha, Elliot and Cala.Mbashe River separates Ngcobo from Mthatha. Durbame used gor peasants

== History ==
On 1 November 1859, a day known in the Christian calendar as All Saints' Day, Chief Fubu of the amaQwathi met with Archdeacon Waters and the Rev John Gordon of the Society for the Propagation of the Gospel in Foreign Parts (SPG). As a result, they were granted a stretch of land in the Xuka valley, and soon thereafter the All Saints mission station was founded on the site under the leadership of the Rev Gordon. Today All Saints Parish is a cathedral. In 1876 Walter Stanford arrived at the station to take up his appointment as Resident Magistrate to the amaQwathi. He established the seat of his magistracy some 8 km from the station on a site known locally as Engcobo, a Xhosa term meaning "a green place next to a stream". In 1879 the amaQwathi rose in rebellion and, during the ensuing hostilities, both the mission and the magistracy were burnt to the ground, forcing their residents to flee. Following the surrender of the amaQwathi, the magistracy was re-established at Engcobo in 1881. The town was previously located in Mjanyana, well known as aleper institution.

Traditionally known as emaQwathini (the land of the Qwathi people), the town of Ngcobo has evolved to accommodate many nationalities. Recently, this town is a home to many Chinese, Pakistani, North African traders and more. The first non Xhosa professionals to settle in this area were Indian doctors working at All Saints Hospital and Ghanaian teachers who flooded the whole of the Transkei in the 1980s.

For many years Ngcobo was the biggest town in the region serving many smaller towns like Cofimvaba, Tsomo, and Cala and this gave rise to a popular Xhosa saying "INgcobo yidolophu" meaning "Don't take it for granted, Ngcobo is a big town".

Ngcobo has two government hospitals:

All Saints General Hospital and Mjanyana TB Hospital

Ngcobo is the birthplace of former ANC president Alfred Bathini Xuma, ANC stalwart Walter Sisulu, UDF stalwart Canon Mcebisi Xundu, Mondli Gungubele Ekurhuleni Mayor, former wife of Nelson Mandela Evelyn Mase and many who played a significant role in the history of South Africa.

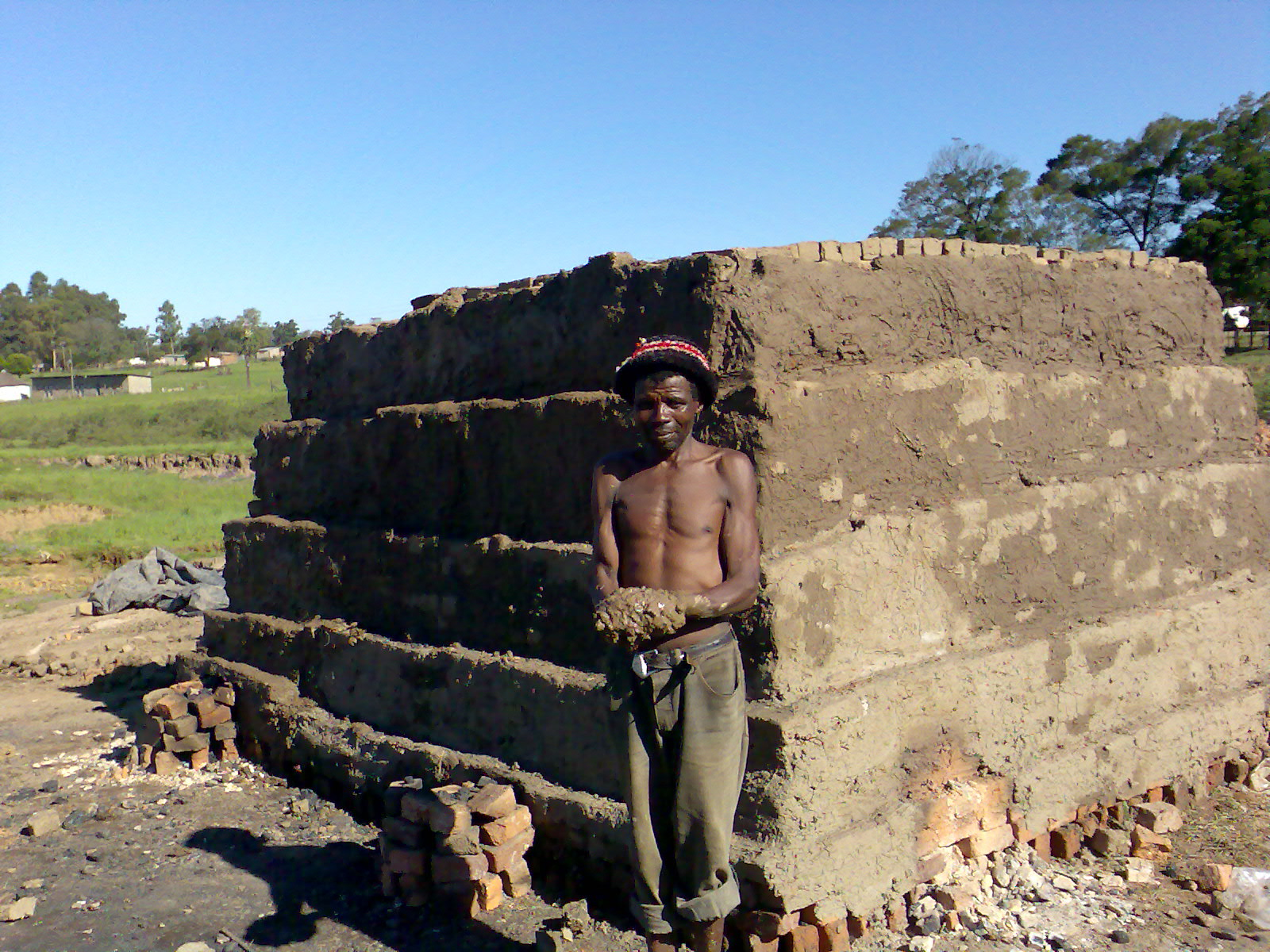
Xhosa brickmaker at kiln near Ngcobo in the former Transkei in the 21st century.

== Notable people ==
- Evelyn Mase, nurse and first wife of the anti-apartheid activist and the future president Nelson Mandela
- Lubabalo Oscar Mabuyane (Eastern Cape ANC Provincial Chairperson and 7th Premier)
- Clarkebury on the banks of Mbhashe River was home to Nelson Mandela at high school level
- Qaqamba Gubanca, social worker and activist
- Ncumisa Jilata, neurosurgeon
- Mbombini Molteno Sihele, Xhosa Councillor and national poet ("imbongi")
- Walter Sisulu, anti-apartheid activist and Secretary General of the African National Congress (ANC)
- Dr Xuma
