= Ncumisa Jilata =

South African neurosurgeon

- Born: Ngcobo, South Africa
- Education: Walter Sisulu University (MBChB); Colleges of Medicine of South Africa
- Occupation: Neurosurgeon

Ncumisa Jilata is a South African neurosurgeon and was one of the youngest neurosurgeons in Africa upon graduation. She was also one of the first Black women neurosurgeons in South Africa.

== Biography ==
Jilata was born in Ngcobo, South Africa. Originally intending to become a chartered accountant, she became interested in the central nervous system while in 11th grade in 2003. This led her to add biology to her high school curriculum in order to start to pursue a medical career path.

Jilata earned her Bachelor of Medicine and Bachelor of Surgery degree from Walter Sisulu University in 2009. While training at Nelson Mandela Academic Hospital in Mthatha, South Africa, she noticed there were no neurosurgeons on staff and all patients needing neurosurgical care had to be transferred to a different hospital, driving her interest towards neurosurgery. She spent five years as a surgical intern at the University of Pretoria in South Africa, finishing her fellowship in 2017. She received her medical degree from the Colleges of Medicine of South Africa.

Upon graduation, Jilata became one out of only five Black women neurosurgeons in South Africa as well as one of the youngest neurosurgeons in Africa at the age of 29. She was praised by South African president Cyril Ramaphosa in a speech to the National Assembly.

Jilata has cited the challenges faced in the male-dominated medicine profession and how she pushes back: "It's natural to be second-guessed as a woman but one’s work ethic will always speak louder". She also works as a consultant for other young doctors, offering training and career guidance. Jilata spends time on community outreach, offering services to combat the lack of information and stigma surrounding neurological conditions.
