= Qaqamba Gubanca =

South African HIV/AIDS activist and mentor mother

- Born: Ngcobo, South Africa
- Occupation: Social worker
- Employer(s): Philani Maternal Child Health and Nutrition Trust

Qaqamba Gubanca is a South African activist and social worker. In 2024 she was one of 24 "significant women" that the Nelson Mandela Foundation chose to feature on Google Arts & Culture for International Women's Day in 2024. This initiative is based on the book 200 Women which features significant South African women.

Born Ngcobo in the Eastern Cape, her parents died and she had a daughter at a young age. After these events, she had to beg from her community. Working in Khayelitsha, Gubanca works for Philani Maternal Child Health and Nutrition Trust where she supports new mothers in townships to access care for their perinatal and antenatal health.

As of 2024, Gubanca was living with HIV.
