= Miss South Africa 2022 =

64th Miss South Africa Pageant

- Date: August 13, 2022
- Presenters: Anele Mdoda; Nico Panagio
- Entertainment: Nadia Nakai; Boity Thulo; Rouge; Heavy-K; Elaine; Makhadzi (singer); Lloyiso; Ndoni
- Venue: SunBet Arena, Time Square, Pretoria
- Broadcaster: M-Net; DStv; Mzansi Magic; Miss South Africa App
- Entrants: 10
- Placements: 5
- Winner: Ndavi Nokeri; Limpopo

Miss South Africa 2022 was the 64th edition of the Miss South Africa pageant, held at the SunBet Arena in Pretoria, South Africa, on 14 August 2022.

Lalela Mswane of KwaZulu-Natal crowned Ndavi Nokeri of Limpopo as her successor. Nokeri represented South Africa at Miss Universe 2022 where she placed as Top 16.

== Results ==
=== Placements ===
Color keys

- The contestant was a Semifinalist in an International pageant.

Placement	Contestant	Placement
Miss South Africa 2022	Limpopo – Ndavi Nokeri	Top 16 – Miss Universe 2022
1st runner-up	KwaZulu-Natal – Ayanda Gugulethu Thabethe	Top 24 – Miss Supranational 2023
2nd runner-up	Gauteng – Lebogang Mahlangu	
Top 5	Western Cape – Luvé Meyer; Western Cape – Tamsyn Jack	

== Delegates ==
The official Top 10 finalists were revealed on 13 June 2022.

Delegate	Age	Province	Hometown	Placement
Anarzade Omar	23	Gauteng	Crown Gardens	
Ayanda Gugulethu Thabethe	22	KwaZulu-Natal	Taylor's Halt	1st Runner-up
Itumeleng Parage	22	Gauteng	Central Western Jabavu	
Keaoleboga Nkashe	26	North West	Itsoseng	
Lebogang Mahlangu	26	Gauteng	Soshanguve	2nd Runner-Up
Luvé Meyer	25	Western Cape	Brackenfell	Top 5
Luyanda Zuma	20	KwaZulu-Natal	Pietermaritzburg	Miss Charm South Africa
Ndavi Nokeri	23	Limpopo	Tzaneen	Miss South Africa 2022
Pearl Ntshehi	25	Gauteng	Mamelodi	
Tamsyn Jack	25	Western Cape	Somerset West	Top 5

=== Top 30 ===
The Top 30 were revealed on 16 May 2022. The following 20 delegates did not advance to the top ten.

Delegate	Age	Province	Hometown
Alyssa Smith	24	KwaZulu-Natal	Pietermaritzburg
Ayanda Tloti	24	Eastern Cape	Sterkspruit
Bethany Damonse	24	Eastern Cape	Summerstrand
Bianca Bezuidenhout	23	Western Cape	Cape Town
Boniswa Mapisa	27	Gauteng	Alberton
Chuma Matsaluka	24	Western Cape	Nyanga
Fortunate Mabeleng	23	Free State	Potchefstroom
Lehlogonolo Machaba	25	North West	Oskraal
Lisanne Lazarus	26	KwaZulu-Natal	Amanzimtoti
Mishqah Snyders	26	Gauteng	Kensington
Mphoentle Plaatjie	25	Gauteng	Waldrift
Naledi Matabane	26	Gauteng	Thembisa
Nompumelelo Mampholo	26	Gauteng	Diepkloof
Nthabiseng Kgasi	26	Gauteng	Protea Glen
Shevon Pereira	25	Gauteng	Roodekrans
Stacy Gossayn	25	Gauteng	Pretoria
Thulani Ndzotyana	24	Eastern Cape	New Brighton
Thyler Diumpies	23	Western Cape	Beaufort West
Tloto Mabiletsa	27	North West	Mafikeng
Zoey Seboe	22	Gauteng	Midrand

== Judges ==
=== Semifinals ===
The following seven judges determined the entrants who made it to the Top 30.

- Liesl Laurie-Mthombeni – Miss South Africa 2015
- Tracey-Lee Lusty Horwitz – Body positive activist and attorney
- Koo Govender – Media mogul and CEO of Dentsu South Africa
- Nobukhosi Mukwevho – Founder of Khosi Nkosi
- Makhosazana Zwane-Siguqa – Editor-in-chief of True Love magazine
- Simoné Pretorius – Actress, screenwriter and founder of Art of Acting SA
- Thando Thabethe – Media personality and entrepreneur

=== Final ===
- Thuli Madonsela – Advocate and professor of law
- Harnaaz Sandhu – Miss Universe 2021 from India
- Thando Thabethe – Media personality and entrepreneur
- Suzette van der Merwe – Miss South Africa 1990
- Devi Sankaree Govender – Investigative television journalist
- Rolene Strauss – Miss South Africa 2014 and Miss World 2014
- Zozibini Tunzi – Miss South Africa 2019 and Miss Universe 2019
