= Ayanda Gugulethu Thabethe =

South African beauty pageant titleholder (born 1999)

- Born: Ayanda Gugulethu Thabethe; 11 November 1999 (age 26); Pietermaritzburg, KwaZulu Natal, South Africa
- Education: University of KwaZulu-Natal
- Occupations: Model; television presenter
- Beauty pageant titleholder
- Title: Miss Supranational South Africa 2023; Miss Cosmo South Africa 2026
- Major competitions: Miss South Africa 2022; (1st Runner-Up); (People's Choice); Miss Supranational South Africa 2023; (Winner); Miss Supranational 2023; (Top 24); (Miss Congeniality); Miss Cosmo 2026; (TBD)

Ayanda Gugulethu Thabethe (born 11 November 1999) is a South African model, television presenter and beauty pageant titleholder who was crowned Miss Supranational South Africa 2023 and Miss Cosmo South Africa 2026. She represented South Africa for the Miss Supranational 2023 in Poland and was placed in the Top 24. She also participated in the Miss South Africa 2022 where she was crowned the 1st runner-up and she also won the People's Choice Award.

== Life and career ==
Thabethe was born and raised in Pietermaritzburg, KwaZulu Natal, South Africa. She went to Pietermaritzburg Girls’ High School and obtained a Bachelor's of Science in Dietetics and Human Nutrition from the University of KwaZulu Natal.

After she was crowned the Miss South Africa 2022, she founded a campaign namely Project Khulisa Ayanda Thabethe. She also pursued a career in television broadcasting as she became a host in Expresso afternoon talk on SABC 3. In 2025, she hosted the 6th annual of Miss Teen Universe South Africa grand finale.

== Pageantry ==
=== Miss South Africa 2022 ===
Thabethe began his pageantry journey when she entered the 64th edition of Miss South Africa and first made in the Top 30. In the finale she was crowned the 1st Runner-Up of Miss South Africa 2022 and won People's Choice Award.

=== Miss Supranational 2023 ===
Following the year, she was crowned the Miss Supranational South Africa 2023 preceded by Lalela Mswane. She represented her country in international competition Miss Supranational 2023 and was placed in the Top 24. She was appointed and crowned the Miss Congeniality and Supra Chat (Top 5).

=== Miss Cosmo 2026 ===
On 13 August 2026, Thabethe was crowned the Miss Cosmo South Africa 2026, and she will represent South Africa at the Miss Cosmo 2026 in Thailand.

== Awards and nominations ==
Year	Association	Category	Nominated works	Result	Ref.
2025	National Film and TV Awards	Best Female TV Personality	Afternoon Express	Nominated	
2025	National Film and TV Awards	Celebrity Personality of the Year	Herself	Nominated	

Awards and achievements
Preceded by Pale Legoabe	Miss Cosmo South Africa; 2026	Succeeded by Incumbent
Preceded by Lalela Mswane	Miss Supranational South Africa; 2023	Succeeded by Bryoni Govender
