= Flavia Senkubuge =

South African doctor and public health expert

- Born: 1978 or 1979 (age 46–47); Uganda
- Education: Queenstown Girls High School
- Alma mater: University of Pretoria; Colleges of Medicine of South Africa; Edinburgh Business School
- Known for: President of the Colleges of Medicine of South Africa
- Scientific career
- Fields: Tobacco control
- Workplaces: University of Pretoria; Colleges of Medicine of South Africa
- Thesis: Smoking-related health risk knowledge, and reactions to cigarette warning labels amongst South African adults (2020)

Flavia Senkubuge (born 1978 or 1979) is a South African physician, professor of public health medicine, an advocate of global public health and the immediate past President of the Colleges of Medicine of South Africa. At age 39, she was the college's youngest ever president and the first Black woman to hold the position.

== Early life and education ==
Senkubuge was raised in Lady Frere, then in the Transkei. She relocated to Queenstown in the Eastern Cape, where she attended Queenstown Girls High School to finish her high school education. As the 1996 Eastern Cape Matric of the year, she received the highest honor given in the region.

== Research and career ==
She graduated with an MB ChB, an MMed and a PhD in public health medicine from the University of Pretoria. Additionally, she has a fellowship from the Colleges of Medicine of South Africa and an MBA from the Edinburgh Business School at Heriot-Watt University in the UK. She served as the Deputy Dean: Health Stakeholder Relations in the Faculty of Health Sciences of the University of Pretoria. In her capacity as Chair of the WHO/AFRO African Advisory Council on Research and Development, she gives advice to the WHO/AFRO regional director on issues pertaining to health research and development in Africa. Senkubuge served as the president of the World Conference on Tobacco or Health. In 2025, Senkubuge became the Dean of the Faculty of Health Sciences at the University of Pretoria.

== Select publications ==
- Flavia Senkubuge; Moeketsi Modisenyane; Tewabech Bishaw (13 February 2014). "Strengthening health systems by health sector reforms". Global Health Action. 7 23568. doi:10.3402/gha.v7.23568. ISSN 1654-9716. PMC 4651248. PMID 24560261. Wikidata Q30386652.
- Johan A. Oldekop; Lorenza B. Fontana; Jean Grugel; et al. (13 December 2015). "100 key research questions for the post-2015 development agenda". Development Policy Review. 34 (1): 55–82. doi:10.1111/dpr.12147. ISSN 0950-6764. Wikidata Q22341634.
