= Lindokuhle Mkhwanazi =

South African soccer player

Personal information
- Full name: Muphinhlanhla Lindokuhle Mkhwanazi
- Date of birth: 12 July 1985 (age 41)
- Place of birth: Richards Bay, South Africa
- Height: 1.66 m (5 ft 5 in)
- Position: Midfielder

Team information
- Current team: Orlando Pirates
- Number: 35

Youth career
- Dark City
- 1999–2001: Bloemfontein Celtic
- 2001–2003: Wits University
- 2003–2007: Orlando Pirates

Senior career*
| Years | Team | Apps | (Gls) |
| 2007– | Orlando Pirates | 10 | (0) |
| 2009–2010 | → Thanda Royal Zulu (loan) | | |
- * Club domestic league appearances and goals

Lindokuhle "Linda" Mkhwanazi (born 12 July 1985) is a South African soccer player who played as a defensive midfielder in the South African Premier Soccer League.

== Career ==
Since making his professional debut on 19 October 2007 – when Pirates went on the rampage, beating Bloemfontein Celtic 3–0 in an ABSA Premiership game.

== International career ==
Mkhwanazi has been competing at an international level with the Under-23 Olympic team.
