= Zhu Ling (economist) =

Chinese economist

- Born: December 1951 (age 74); Shou County, Anhui, China

Academic work
- Discipline: Agricultural economics
- Institutions: Chinese Academy of Social Sciences

Zhu Ling (Chinese: 朱玲; born December 1951) is a Chinese economist who served as the deputy director and researcher in the Institute of Economics, Chinese Academy of Social Sciences (CASS), professor of graduate school and supervisor of doctorate student at Institute of Economics, CASS. She was elected a member of CASS in 2010. Previously, she was an executive member at International Association of Agricultural Economics (IAAE), Vice president of the Chinese Agricultural & Applied Economics Association, and had joined the research group of Millennium Development Goals of the United Nations.

She is a member of theoretical economics consultative group at Academic Degree Commission of the State Council and member of professional advisory committee of the State Council's aid-the-poor leading group. She was awarded (first) Excellent Science Research Achievement at Chinese Academy of Social Sciences in 1993; (seventh) Sunyefang Economics Science Award in 1996; second place in (fifth) Excellent Science Research Achievement at Chinese Academy of Social Sciences in 2004; (third) China Rural Development Research Award in 2008.

== Biography ==
Zhu was born in Shou County, Anhui, China in 1951. She earned a master's degree in economics from Wuhan University in 1981. Thereafter, she started research work in the Institute of Economics at Chinese Academy of Social Sciences. She completed her doctorate in agricultural economics at the University of Hohenheim in 1988. After her graduation in 1988, she went back to China and continued her economic research in the Institute of Economics at Chinese Academy of Social Sciences. Previously, she served as an executive member at International Association of Agricultural Economics (IAAE), vice president of the Chinese Agricultural Economics Association; and had joined the research group of Millennium Development Goals of the United Nations. Currently, she serves as the deputy director and researcher at the Institute of Economics in Chinese Academy of Social Sciences; was appointed as member of theoretical economics consultative group at Academic Degree Commission of the State Council and member of professional advisory committee of the State Council's aid-the-poor leading group.

In order to find a way to alleviate poverty in the rural area, she proposed the idea of combining relief and employment as well as improving infrastructure and social services. In her research of health economics, she revealed the responsibility-defect of the government in the field of rural cooperative medical service, public house care and peasant-workers' medical insurance. Throughout the process of introducing the gender perspective into economic research, she used statistical models to analyze the gender inequality in farm-land allocation, basic medical care and endowment insurance.

== Research ==
Zhu's research interests are primarily in the area of development microeconomics, focuses on income distribution, poverty reduction, social security and country development, pay attention to tracking investigation on survival and development of countryside poverty group, peasant workers, women and minorities. Her research methods are primarily based on gathering and studying existing articles and historical data, then carrying out on-the-spot interview and sampling survey. By using theory and statistic method, she emphatically analyzes first-hand data and cases, then theoretically explain the arising problems in the transformation and development process of socioeconomic systems.

So far, as the first author, Zhu has published three English monographs; as first author and second author, has published seven Chinese monographs, more than one hundred Chinese papers and more than ten English papers. According to literature center of Chinese Academy of Social Sciences, between 1995 and 2009, some of her work has been reprinted, extracted and edited under permission. Following are some of her main research area:

=== "The impact of rural economic reform on the peasant households' economic safety" ===
From 1985 to 1990, this research was supported by central rural research centre. The main discover of this research is that the implement of household responsibility system and the detribalization of people's commune incent peasants improving the efficiency of resource allocation, in the meantime, leave a blank in agriculture infrastructure construction and village public service supplying system. At the same time, a single peasant is facing increasing uncertainty and risks. She referred to the experience of developed countries and the creation of Chinese peasants’ system and came up with key solutions. The first solution is to reinforced the public investment and service function of the government. The second solution is letting the village-autonomy to play a role. With the deformation detribalization of people's commune, community organizations could supplement partial functions of basic regime in the field of public affairs. Under the condition that the market mechanism is not fully developed, community organizations can partially supplement the role of the market in the process of production factor allocation; the third solution is to promote the development of farmers' cooperative organizations.

In her papers under this topic, two of which were respectively published in the British Journal of Development Studies, 1990, issue 2, and Cambridge Journal of Economics, 1993. Adopted in phase 4.

=== "The issue of income inequality" ===
This research study has continued from 1985 to the present, mainly through statistical analysis of sample survey data to identify factors that significantly affect income inequality. In the research, Zhu emphasized that although the market economy may provide people with equal entrepreneurship and employment opportunities, the initial conditions for individuals to enter the market are different. Therefore, the government needs to adopt redistribution and public service projects to alleviate its adverse effects.

=== "Economic analysis of gender inequality" ===
In 1995, Zhu attended the fourth world conference on women as a member of the Chinese government delegation. Since then, the gender perspective has been introduced into most of her research projects, among which the paper under the topic about gender equality in agricultural land distribution has won the second prize of the fifth excellent scientific research achievement of the Chinese Academy of social sciences. The article shows that the existing discrimination against women in rural society makes the policy of equal distribution of land resulting in gender inequality.

In 2010, Zhu published the research report about survey on the health problems of women farmers and herdsmen in Qinghai-Gansu and Yunnan-Tibet areas in the 10th journal article of world management. In her research, she found that the disease threat faced by Tibetan women farmers was mostly related to poverty. However, health services, especially women's health services, are the weak links in the development of Tibetan areas and the implementation of the poverty alleviation plan. Sick farming and animal husbandry housewives not only have difficulty in providing good nutrition and health care for the whole family, but also tend to deepen the poverty level of the family due to their own disease burden, and easily cause stunted children, thus leading to the intergenerational transmission of poverty. Therefore, the government needs to take interventions to solve this problem. The innovation of some primary health care systems in Tibetan areas in Yunnan and Gansu province can provide valuable experience for policy improvement in other Tibetan areas.Zhu found that, in rural Tibetan areas, the school feeding program had been put into practice more effectively than antenatal care and infant and young child feeding programs.

=== "Poverty reduction policy research" ===
Based on the understanding of living conditions of poor groups coming from her studies about income distribution, Zhu has been exploring effective ways to alleviate and eliminate poverty since 1990. Firstly, an interdisciplinary study of economics, sociology, and nutrition is conducted on the poverty reduction effect of the “work relief” project. Using the statistical methods such as decision analysis model and Gini coefficient decomposition, the ideal method of balance diet developed by nutritionists was introduced to analyze the sample data of villages and farmers, and to see the impact of policy intervention on farmers' food security, income and financial status. Based on this, it analyzes the relationship between macroeconomic reform and the implementation of poverty reduction plans, and summarizes the current gains and losses of poverty alleviation policies. Zhu's research report “The Impact of Public Works on Economic Growth, Employment and Social Services in Rural Poverty Areas” (published in Chinese) has won the first Distinguished Scientific Research Achievement Award of the Chinese Academy of Social Sciences in 1993; her joint monograph with the Ministry of Agriculture's, "Yigongdaizhen and poverty reduction" was awarded the 7th Sun Yefang Economic Science Award in 1996. The English version of this book was published in the UK's Development Policy Review, No. 4, 1995.

Secondly, Zhu examines the operational mechanism of poverty-alleviation-loans, and draws on international experience and the effective informal system in rural China to propose improvement measures. Her research report was serialized in Journal of Financial Research, No. 6 and 7 of 1995; Her English papers written with colleagues from the Ministry of Agriculture and Kiel (fellow student in Germany), were being discussed in 1997 at the annual meeting of the International Society of Agricultural Economics and at the poverty-reduction-policy seminar of Asian and African countries; the monograph "Credit System for the Rural Poor in China" was published by the US Nova Science Publishers Company in 1997.

=== "Pension plan for rural residents and peasant-workers" ===
During the period of 2007–2010, Zhu led the research team to first conduct a sample survey on the current situation of peasant workers participating in endowment insurance. Secondly, she followed up on the progress of the pilot project of the new rural residents' social endowment insurance. Besides, she was being assigned to lead the research on the construction of social security system planning project for "Twelfth Five-Year Plan".

Based on the research on the construction of the social security system in the "Twelfth Five-Year Plan", Zhu has written in the Chinese Journal of Population Science (2010) that the fragmentation of China's existing social security system makes the whole system unfair and loss of efficiency. Public sector workers, especially civil servants (civil service workers), are “overprotected”, and non-public sector workers, especially farmers and rural migrant workers, are “insufficiently protected”. The implementation of the new rural cooperative medical system, the new rural insurance and the participation of peasant workers in social insurance, which is previously for urban workers, will help promote social security. In order to convey the findings and information to decision-making officials and the public, Zhu has attended the Central Office during the period of 2009–2010, the 21st Century Forum organized by the National Committee of the Chinese People's Political Consultative Conference, the seminar organized by the Ministry of Social Security, and the China Social Science Forum to give lectures or make speeches. In addition, she has submitted policy reports to decision-making government officials. Finally, the research report on the promotion methods of the “new rural insurance” and the sustainability of the system were approved by the central government.

== Experience ==
- Member of the Academy, Chinese Academy of Social Sciences, Beijing, Since Mar. 2011
- Permanent post as staff member at Institute of Economics, Chinese Academy of Social Sciences, Beijing, Since Dec. 1981

International academic:

- Board member for UN University-WIDER (2011- )
- Member of the Board of Trustees (2006-2012) - International Food Policy Research Institute
- Member of the Board (2002-2007) - Asian Scholarship Foundation
- Member of IAAE Executive Committee (2000-2003) - International Association of Agriculture Economists

National policy advisor:

- Member of Theoretical Economics Group Academic Degrees Committee of the State Council (2003- )
- Member of Advisory Committee to the Government of the Tibetan Autonomous Region (2006- )
- Member of Advisory Committee to the Leading Group of the State Council for Poverty Reduction (2010- )

Visiting scholar:

- Feb.- May 1989, Institute for Development Studies (IDS) University of Sussex, UK
- 1991–94, International Food Policy Research Institute (IFPRI) Washington, D.C. USA (One month visit per year)
- Sept.- Oct. 1998, Center for Development Research (ZEF) University of Bonn, Germany
- Jan. - Mar. 2003, Institute of Social Studies (ISS) The Hague, the Netherlands

(Information from University of Hohenheim - Zhu Ling)

== Selected awards ==
- Zhang Peigang Developmental Economics Research Distinguished Achievement Award, 2014
- Justus von Liehig Award for World Nutrition, 2013
- China Rural Development Research Award, 2008
- Distinguished Scientific Award, Second Prize, Chinese Academy of Social Sciences, 2004
- Sun Yefang Economics Award, 1996
- Distinguished Scientific Award, Chinese Academy of Social Sciences, 1993

== Selected bibliography ==
=== Books ===
- Zhu, Ling. 2017. Food Security and Social Protection for the Rural Poor in China. Routledge, April 6, 2017.
- Zhu, Ling. 2014. “Addressing Extreme Poverty and Marginality: Experiences in Rural China.” In Marginality: Addressing the Nexus of Poverty, Exclusion and Ecology, edited by Joachim von Braun and Franz W. Gatzweiler, 239–55. New York and Heidelberg: Springer. doi: https://doi.org/10.1007/978-94-007-7061-4
- Wang, Luolin, and Zhu, Ling. 2013. Breaking Out of the Poverty Trap: Case Studies from the Tibetan Plateau in Yunnan, Qinghai and Gansu. Hackensack, N.J. doi: https://doi.org/10.1007/978-94-007-7061-4
- Braun, J.; Jiang, Zhongyi; Zhu, Ling; Credit for Rural Poor in China, Nova Science Publishers, Inc. New York, 1997. ISBN 1560724420
- Jiang, Zhongyi; Zhu, Ling.1994. Public Works and Poverty Alleviation in Rural China, Chinese version: Shanghai People's Publishing House and Shanghai Sanlian Book Store, Shanghai, 1994; English version: Nova Science Publishers, Inc. New York, 1996.
- Zhu, Ling. 1991. Rural Reform and Peasant Income in China, The Macmillan Press LTD, London. doi: https://doi.org/10.1057/9780230373181

=== Papers ===
- Zhu, Ling, and Ping Xu. 2015. “The Politics of Welfare Exclusion: Immigration and Disparity in Medicaid Coverage.” Policy Studies Journal 43 (4): 456–83.
- Zhu, Ling. 2011. Agricultural Change and Food Security in China, in Food security and the futures of farms, Published by the Royal Swedish Academy of Agriculture and Forestry, No.1, 2011, Stockholm.
- Zhu, Ling, Zhongyi Jiang, Chengwu Jin, and Zhen Wang. 2010. “China’s New Rural Pension Scheme: Practice and Problems.” China Economist, no. 28 (September): 100–108.
- Zhu, Ling, and Chengwu Jin. 2009. “Income Distribution Policy Options amid the Global Financial Crisis.” China Economist, no. 21 (July): 59–64.
- Zhu, Ling. 2008. “Impacts of Food and Energy Price Hikes and Proposed Coping Strategies.” China and World Economy 16 (6): 35–45. doi:http://onlinelibrary.wiley.com.ezproxy.library.ubc.ca/journal/10.1111/%28ISSN%291749-124X/issues.
- Zhu, Ling. 2007. “Effects of Rural Medical Financial Assistance in China.” China and World Economy 15 (2): 16–28. doi:http://onlinelibrary.wiley.com.ezproxy.library.ubc.ca/journal/10.1111/%28ISSN%291749-124X/issues.
- Ling, Z. and Zhongyi, J. 1995. ‘Yigong‐daizhen’ in China: A New Experience with Labour‐intensive Public Works in Poor Areas. Development Policy Review, 13: 349–370. doi:10.1111/j.1467-7679.1995.tb00098.x
- Selden, Mark; Zhu, Ling.1993. Agricultural cooperation and the family farm in China, in Bulletin of Concerned Asian Scholars, vol.25, no.3, 1993, Boulder, Colorado.
- Zhu, Ling; Jiang, Zhongyi. "From Brigade to Village Community: The Land Tenure System and Rural Development in China." Cambridge Journal of Economics 17, no. 4 (1993): 441–61. doi: http://www.jstor.org/stable/23599795.
- Zhu, Ling.1990. The transformation of the operating mechanisms in Chinese agriculture, The Journal of Development Studies, 26:2, 229–242, doi: 10.1080/00220389008422149
