= Colleges of Medicine of South Africa =

Coordinates: 33°57′29.15″S 18°29′9.95″E

The Colleges of Medicine of South Africa (CMSA) is a postgraduate medical association that acts as the custodian of the quality of medical care in the country. It comprises 29 constituent Colleges, which represent all the disciplines of medicine and dentistry. The sole path to medical specialisation in South Africa is through a fellowship conferred by the college.

== History ==
CMSA was established and funded in 1954 by members of the medical profession, officially registering as a non-profit making company in 1955. It has facilities in Cape Town and Johannesburg, encompassing lecture venues, committee and reception rooms, and an office in Durban. In 2018, the college elected its first Black female president, Dr Flavia Senkubuge.

== Fellowships ==
The specialist qualifications obtained through The CMSA are referred to as Fellowships, a designation similar to those used in various countries. These Fellowships are recognised by the Health Professions Council of South Africa as acceptable for specialist registration and are recognised worldwide.

For non-specialist medical and dental practitioners, the CMSA offers Higher Diploma and Diploma qualifications which are registered by the HPCSA as additional qualifications. There is also an additional qualification for those who obtain a Certificate in one of the subspecialities.

== Colleges of the CMSA ==
- College of Anaesthetists
- College of Cardiothoracic Surgeons
- College of Clinical Pharmacologists
- College of Dentistry
- College of Dermatologists
- College of Emergency Medicine
- College of Family Physicians
- College of Forensic Pathologists
- College of Maxillo-Facial and Oral Surgeons
- College of Medical Geneticists
- College of Neurologists
- College of Neurosurgeons
- College of Nuclear Physicians
- College of Obstetricians and Gynaecologists
- College of Ophthalmologists
- College of Orthopaedic Surgeons
- College of Otorhinolaryngologists
- College of Paediatric Surgeons
- College of Paediatricians
- College of Pathologists
- College of Physicians
- College of Plastic Surgeons
- College of Psychiatrists
- College of Public Health Medicine
- College of Radiation Oncologists
- College of Radiologists
- College of Sports medicine
- College of Surgeons
- College of Urologists

== Notable alumni ==
- Glenda Gray
- Ncumisa Jilata
- Salim Abdool Karim
