= Boston City Campus =

Boston City Campus, formerly Boston City Campus and Business College, is a private higher education institution in South Africa. It offers undergraduate, postgraduate, and professional qualifications through online distance learning. The institution is registered with the South African Department of Higher Education and Training.

== History ==
Boston City Campus was founded in 1991 by Ari Katz.

In the 1990s and early 2000s, Boston City Campus established a partnership with the University of South Africa (UNISA). It acted as one of the first licensed providers assisting UNISA students with academic support, including additional tuition for selected UNISA degree programmes.

Over time, the institution expanded its academic offerings and geographic footprint and developed an online distance learning model and a network of academic support centres.

== Campuses and support centres ==
Boston City Campus operates academic support centres across South Africa. The centres provide student services and support functions, including administrative and assessment support.

Teaching and learning are delivered primarily through online distance education platforms.

Boston City Campus appears on the Department of Higher Education and Training register of private higher education institutions.

== Academic profile ==
Boston City Campus offers qualifications aligned with South Africa's National Qualifications Framework, including higher certificates, diplomas, bachelor's degrees, honours degrees, postgraduate diplomas, MBAs and short courses.

Many qualifications are delivered through online distance and e-learning, commonly described by the institution as Open Distance e-Learning (ODEL).

Academic provision includes programmes in business management, accounting, law-related studies, human resources, information technology, education, and logistics and supply chain management.

== Academic governance and assessment ==
Academic governance and quality assurance are conducted in line with South African higher education requirements.

Assessment and moderation processes support distance e-learning delivery models. These processes include internal and external moderation.

== Accreditation and quality assurance ==
Boston City Campus is registered with the South African Department of Higher Education and Training as a private higher education institution.

Selected business-related programmes have received international accreditation from the Accreditation Council for Business Schools and Programs (ACBSP).

Boston City Campus holds accreditation from the British Accreditation Council (BAC).

== Recognition and awards ==
Boston City Campus has received recognition in the information technology training sector from CompTIA, including Partner of the Year and related awards.

The institution has appeared in the Sunday Times GenNext Awards in the "Coolest Colleges" category in successive years.

== See also ==
- Private higher education in South Africa
- Distance education in South Africa
