= Afternoon Express =

2015 South African TV talk show

- Afternoon Express
- Genre: Magazine
- Directed by: Vardi Flvaz
- Presented by: Palesa Tembe
- Country of origin: South Africa
- Original language: English
- No. of seasons: 5

Production
- Executive producers: Bradley van Berg; Patience Stevens
- Producer: Alshe du Plessis
- Production location: Cape Town
- Camera setup: Shawn Inskip Peter Nielson Rudy Drega
- Running time: 60 Minutes
- Production company: Cardova

Original release
- Network: SABC 3
- Release: 4 May 2015

Related
- Expresso Morning Show

Afternoon Express is a South African advertiser-funded production variety magazine talk show produced by Cardova for SABC 3.

== Presenters ==
- Palesa Tembe
- Ayanda Thabethe
- Carishma Basday
- Kyle Clark

=== Past presenters ===
- Jeannie D
- Bonnie Mbuli
- Bonang Matheba
- Danilo Acquisto
- Zuraida Jardine

== History ==
On 18 February 2015, a press release from SABC 3, stated that their longest running talk show, Three Talk, would come to an end on 20 April 2015. This comes after host of the show, Noeleen Maholwana-Sangqu, announced her retirement after 12 years of service, however, other reports say the show had been cancelled due to low ratings. In April 2015, SABC 3 announced that Afternoon Express would take its place. The channel started broadcasting the show live on 4 May 2015.
