= Miss Supranational 2022 =

13th Miss Supranational pageant, beauty pageant edition

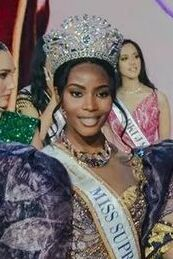
- Lalela Mswane, Miss Supranational 2022
- Date: 15 July 2022
- Theme: Aspirational • Inspirational
- Venue: Strzelecki Park Amphitheater, Nowy Sącz, Lesser, Poland
- Broadcaster: Polsat; Globovisión; Metro TV; CNN International; Zoom; Trinidad and Tobago Television
- Entrants: 69
- Placements: 24
- Debuts: Cambodia; Kyrgyzstan; Lesotho
- Withdrawals: Albania; Bahamas; Guadeloupe; Guyana; Norway; Russia; Rwanda; Sierra Leone; South Sudan; Suriname; Sweden
- Returns: Argentina; Costa Rica; Côte d'Ivoire; Cuba; Curaçao; Denmark; Guatemala; Hong Kong; Kazakhstan; Laos; Malaysia; Mauritius; Singapore; Turkey; Ukraine; Uruguay; Vietnam; Zambia; Zimbabwe
- Winner: Lalela Mswane; South Africa
- Congeniality: Jessica Bailey; Canada
- Best National Costume: Almendra Castillo; Peru
- Photogenic: Ritika Khatnani; India

Miss Supranational 2022 was the 13th edition of the Miss Supranational pageant, held on 15 July 2022, at Strzelecki Park Amphitheater in Nowy Sącz, Poland. Chanique Rabe of Namibia crowned Lalela Mswane of South Africa at the end of the event. This edition marked the first back to back win for contestants from Africa, and the first Black woman who won Miss Supranational.

== Background ==
=== Location and date ===
On 26 April 2022, Gerhard Parzutka von Lipinski, the president of Miss and Mister Supranational, announced that 13th edition of the Miss Supranational competition would return to Nowy Sacz in the Lesser region in June and July, and the final night would be held on 15 July 2022.

=== Presenters ===
Anita Nneka Jones returned as host and joined by Martin Fitch, with backstage coverage by Ivan Podrez.

- Ivan Podrez, presenter of the Miss Supranational challenges
- Nneka Jones, presenter for Sky News, BBC Radio London and Premier League
- Martin Fitch, presenter and actor

=== Panel of experts ===
The preliminary competition was broadcast live on the official Miss Supranational YouTube channel at 9pm CET on 12 July 2022. The preliminary interview judges and members of a panel of experts were announced.

- Anntonia Porsild – Miss Supranational 2019 from Thailand
- Chanique Rabe – Miss Supranational 2021 from Namibia
- Gerhard Patzutka Von Lipinski – president of the Miss and Mister Supranational organisation
- Valeria Vázquez – Miss Supranational 2018 from Puerto Rico and ambassador for Jubiler Schubert
- Varo Vargas – Mister Supranational 2021 from Peru
- Doda – Polish singer, winner of 130 music awards, activist and member of Mensa Poland (only as final telecast judge)
- Marcelina Zawadzka – Television Host, model and Miss Polonia 2011 (only as final telecast judge)
- Monika Lewczuk – Singer and Miss Supranational 2011 from Poland (only as final telecast judge)
- Andre Sleigh – creative director of the Miss and Mister Supranational (only as preliminary judge)
- Eoanna Constanza – Miss Supranational 2021 4th runner-up from Dominican Republic (only as preliminary judge)
- Valentina Sánchez – Miss Supranational 2021 3rd Runner-up from Venezuela (only as preliminary judge)

=== New Supranational crown ===
The new Miss Supranational crown was designed by Ricardo Patraca and was introduced during Miss Supranational 2022 preliminary competition.

== Results ==
=== Placements ===
Placement	Contestant
Miss Supranational 2022	South Africa – Lalela Mswane
1st Runner-Up	Thailand – Praewwanich Ruangthong
2nd Runner-Up	Vietnam – Nguyễn Huỳnh Kim Duyên Δ
3rd Runner-Up	Indonesia – Adinda Cresheilla Δ
4th Runner-Up	Venezuela – Ismelys Velásquez
Top 12	Colombia – Valentina Espinosa; Czech Republic – Kristýna Malířová Δ; India – Ritika Khatnani; Kenya – Roleen Mose §; Mauritius – Alexandrine Belle-Étoile; Peru – Almendra Castillo; Poland – Agata Wdowiak
Top 24	Bolivia – Macarena Castillo; Brazil – Giovanna Reis; Ecuador – Valery Carabalí; Ghana – Gifty Boakye Δ; Guatemala – María Fernanda Milián; Hong Kong – Kumiko Lau; Jamaica – Carisa Peart; Malaysia – Melisha Lin; Namibia – Julita Kitwe Mbangula; Philippines – Alison Black; Romania – Andra Tache; Trinidad and Tobago – Christin Coeppicus

Notes:

§ – placed into the Top 12 by fan-voting challenge

Δ – placed into the Top 24 by fast-track challenges

=== Continental titleholders ===
It was awarded to delegates with the highest placement in the continent without being in the Top 5.

Continent	Contestant	Ref.
Africa	Mauritius – Alexandrine Belle-Étoile	
Americas	Colombia – Valentina Espinosa	
Asia	India – Ritika Khatnani	
Caribbean	Jamaica – Carisa Peart	
Europe	Poland – Agata Wdowiak	

=== Special awards ===
Award	Contestant	Ref.
Best National Costume	Peru – Almendra Castillo	
Miss Congeniality	Canada – Jessica Bailey	
Miss Photogenic	India – Ritika Khatnani	
Miss Talent	Philippines – Alison Black	
Miss Elegance	Turkey – Şira Sahili	
Woman of Substance	Namibia – Julita Kitwe Mbangula	

=== Fast track challenges ===
Challenge	Contestant	Ref.
Supra Chat	Indonesia – Adinda Cresheilla; Vietnam – Nguyễn Huỳnh Kim Duyên	
Supra Model of the Year	Czech Republic – Kristýna Malířová	
Supra Influencer	Ghana – Gifty Boakye	
Supra Fan-Vote	Kenya – Roleen Mose	

== Challenge events ==
=== Fast Track Events ===
Supra Fan-Vote

The winner of the Supra Fan Vote will automatically advance to the Top 12 finalists of Miss Supranational 2022.

Final results	Country	Ref.
Winner	Kenya – Roleen Mose	
Top 10	China – Sophia Su; El Salvador – Jennifer Figueroa; Indonesia – Adinda Cresheilla; Netherlands – Serena Darder; Philippines – Alison Black; South Africa – Lalela Mswane; Thailand – Praewwanich Ruangthong; Vietnam – Nguyễn Huỳnh Kim Duyên; Zambia – Savena Mushinge	
Top 13	India – Ritika Khatnani; Japan – Rina Okada; Malaysia – Melisha Lin	

==== Miss Supra Influencer ====
On 4 July 2022, Miss Supra Influencer Top 42 finalists were announced via the organization's official Facebook account. The Top 22 finalists were announced via Miss Supranational official instagram account on 6 July 2022. The winner will be announced as a semi-finalist during the finals.

Final results	Country	Ref.
Winner	Ghana – Gifty Boakye	
Top 10	Ecuador – Valery Carabalí; Finland – Jana Boricheva; France – Valentine Le Corre; Germany – Jasmin Selberg; India – Ritika Khatnani; Malaysia – Melisha Lin; Malta – Nicole Vella; Namibia – Julita Kitwe Mbangula; Singapore – Jiayi Sin	
Top 15 (After 3rd Round Challenge)	Denmark – Johanne Hansen; Netherlands – Serena Darder; Philippines – Alison Black; Portugal – Ana Rita Aguiar; Slovakia – Jana Vozarová	
Top 22 (After 2nd Round Challenge)	Curaçao – Risandra Simon; Haiti – Lynn Rubiane St-Germain; Lesotho – Boitumelo Sehlotho; Peru – Almendra Castillo; Romania – Andra Tache; South Africa – Lalela Mswane; Uruguay – Ximena Bertinat	
Top 42 (After 1st Round Challenge)	Belgium – Thanaree Scheerlinck; Canada – Jessica Bailey; Colombia – Valentina Espinosa; Côte d'Ivoire – Cadic N'guessan; Czech Republic – Kristýna Malířová; Dominican Republic – Emely Ruíz; El Salvador – Jennifer Figueroa; Greece – Eliza Sophia; Indonesia – Adinda Cresheilla; Ireland – Shannon McCullagh; Jamaica – Carisa Peart; Japan – Rina Okada; Laos – Narathip Siripaphanh; Mexico – Regina González; Poland – Agata Wdowiak; Puerto Rico – Ariette Banchs; Spain – Ana Karła Ramírez; Trinidad and Tobago – Christin Coeppicus; United States – Sofia Acosta; Zambia – Savena Mushinge	

==== Supra Model of the Year ====
Supra Model of the Year was broadcast live via Miss Supranational official Facebook and YouTube on 3 July 2022. One of the five continental winners will be announced as the winner and be a semi-finalist in the finals.

Final results	Country		Ref.
Overall Winner	Czech Republic – Kristýna Malířová		
Continental Winners	Africa	Mauritius – Alexandrine Belle-Étoile	
Continental Winners	Americas	Colombia – Valentina Espinosa	
Continental Winners	Asia	Vietnam – Nguyễn Huỳnh Kim Duyên	
Continental Winners	Caribbean	Jamaica – Carisa Peart	
Continental Winners	Europe	Czech Republic – Kristýna Malířová	
Top 11	Haiti – Lynn Rubiane St-Germain; India – Ritika Khatnani; Indonesia – Adinda Cresheilla; Panama – Cecilia Medina; Romania – Andra Tache; South Africa – Lalela Mswane		

==== Supra Chat ====
Round 1

Supra Chat 2022 Episode 1 premiered on Miss Supranational official YouTube channel on 9 June 2022.

- Advanced to Semifinal

Group	Country 1	Country 2	Country 3	Country 4	Country 5	Country 6	Country 7	Country 8
1	Greece	India	Lesotho	Nigeria	Poland	Portugal	Romania	Slovakia
2	Bolivia	Canada	Colombia	Costa Rica	Dominican Republic	Guatemala	Iceland	Mexico
3	Belgium	Côte d'Ivoire	Mauritius	Namibia	South Africa	~~Togo~~	Turkey	—N/a
4	Curaçao	Ecuador	Haiti	Jamaica	Kenya	Panama	Trinidad and Tobago	United States
5	Cambodia	Hong Kong	Japan	Kazakhstan	Kyrgyzstan	Laos	South Korea	Vietnam
6	Czech Republic	Denmark	Finland	Germany	Malta	Netherlands	Spain	Zambia
7	France	Indonesia	Ireland	Nepal	Philippines	Singapore	Thailand	Zimbabwe
8	Argentina	Brazil	Chile	China	El Salvador	Paraguay	Peru	Puerto Rico
9	Cuba	England	Ghana	Malaysia	Ukraine	Uruguay	Venezuela	—N/a

===== Semi-finals =====
- Advanced to Final

The 18 finalists were split into 2 semi-finals which were filmed in Poland. 5 winners from each semi-final will be chosen to advance to the finals.

Semi Final	Country 1	Country 2	Country 3	Country 4	Country 5	Country 6	Country 7	Country 8	Country 9
1	Bolivia	Canada	China	Côte d'Ivoire	Haiti	Hong Kong	India	Indonesia	Jamaica
2	Lesotho	Malaysia	Namibia	Nepal	Netherlands	Peru	Venezuela	Vietnam	Zambia

===== Finals =====
The winner of each final will be announced as a semi-finalist during the finals.

Final results	Final 1	Final 2	Ref.
Winner	Indonesia – Adinda Cresheilla	Vietnam – Nguyễn Huỳnh Kim Duyên	
Top 5	Bolivia – Macarena Castillo; China – Sophia Su; Haiti – Lynn Rubiane St-Germain; Hong Kong – Kumiko Lau	Malaysia – Melisha Lin; Namibia – Julita Kitwe Mbangula; Netherlands – Serena Darder; Zambia – Savena Mushinge	

=== Non-Fast Track Events ===
Miss Talent

Talent competition were held on 3 July 2022, during the charity auction ‘Evening of Fashion and Culture for Ukraine’. The delayed broadcast of the competition were official premiered via Miss Supranational YouTube channel on 4 July 2022. Miss Malaysia, Melisha Lin was included in the line-up but were not chosen as a finalist.

Final results	Country	Ref.
Winner	Philippines – Alison Black	
Top 3	India – Ritika Khatnani; Japan – Rina Okada	
Top 6	Indonesia – Adinda Cresheilla; Jamaica – Carisa Peart; Mexico – Regina González	

==== Miss Elegance ====
Miss Elegance competition were held on 8 July 2022. The delayed broadcast of the competition were official premiered via Miss Supranational YouTube channel on 9 July 2022. Miss Turkey, Şira Sahilli, was named as the winner at the end of the event.

Final results	Country	Ref.
Miss Elegance	Turkey – Şira Sahilli	
1st Runner-Up	Argentina – Maira Acst	
2nd Runner-Up	Thailand – Praewwanich Ruangthong	
Top 15	Brazil – Giovanna Reis; Ecuador – Valery Carabalí; Guatemala – María Fernanda Milián; Indonesia – Adinda Cresheilla; Japan – Rina Okada; Kazakhstan – Aigerim Baitore; Laos – Narathip Siripaphanh; Nigeria – Adaeze Chineme; Panama – Cecilia Medina; Spain – Ana Karla Ramírez; Trinidad and Tobago – Christin Coeppicus; Ukraine – Diana Mironenko	

== Contestants ==
69 contestants competed for Miss Supranational 2022:

Country/Territory	Delegate	Age (Note: Ages at the time of the pageant)	Hometown	Continental Group
Argentina	Maira Acst	24	Corrientes	Americas
Belgium	Thanaree Scheerlinck	26	Wemmel	Europe
Bolivia	Macarena Castillo	24	Tupiza	Americas
Brazil	Giovanna Reis	21	Cascavel	Americas
Cambodia	Leakena In	23	Siem Reap	Asia
Canada	Jessica Bailey	24	Langley	Americas
Chile	Constanza Araos	24	Coquimbo	Americas
China	Sophia Su	27	Harbin	Asia
Colombia	Valentina Espinosa	24	Cartagena	Americas
Costa Rica	Natalia González	23	San José	Americas
(Ivory Coast) Côte d'Ivoire	Cadic N'guessan	22	Abidjan	Africa
Cuba	Liz Rodríguez	18	Camagüey	Caribbean
Curaçao	Risandra Simon	24	Willemstad	Caribbean
Czech Republic	Kristýna Malířová	23	Čížkovice	Europe
Denmark	Johanne Hansen	20	Næstved	Europe
Dominican Republic	Emely Ruíz	29	Mao	Caribbean
Ecuador	Valery Carabalí	23	Guayaquil	Americas
El Salvador	Jennifer Figueroa	21	Santa Ana	Americas
England	Kate Marie	28	Coventry	Europe
Finland	Jana Boricheva	20	Turenki	Europe
France	Valentine Le Corre	21	Paris	Europe
Germany	Jasmin Selberg	22	Dortmund	Europe
Ghana	Gifty Boakye	29	Akwatia	Africa
Greece	Eliza Sophia	20	Athens	Europe
Guatemala	María Fernanda Milián	25	Cobán	Americas
Haiti	Lynn Rubiane St-Germain	28	Port-au-Prince	Caribbean
Hong Kong	Kumiko Lau	28	Tai Po	Asia
Iceland	Íris Freyja Salguero	23	Mosfellsbær	Europe
India	Ritika Khatnani	20	Pune	Asia
Indonesia	Adinda Cresheilla	24	Surabaya	Asia
(Republic of Ireland) Ireland	Shannon McCullagh	25	Belfast	Europe
Jamaica	Carisa Peart	27	Saint Ann Parish	Caribbean
Japan	Rina Okada	27	Sapporo	Asia
Kazakhstan	Aigerim Baitore	24	Almaty	Asia
Kenya	Roleen Mose	19	Nairobi	Africa
Kyrgyzstan	Shirin Alaychieva	18	Osh	Asia
Laos	Narathip Siripaphanh	24	Vientiane	Asia
Lesotho	Boitumelo Sehlotho	20	Maseru	Africa
Malaysia	Melisha Lin	25	Batu Caves	Asia
Malta	Nicole Vella	22	Rabat	Europe
Mauritius	Alexandrine Belle-Étoile	25	Curepipe	Africa
Mexico	Regina González	20	Zapopan	Americas
Namibia	Julita Kitwe Mbangula	26	Oshakati	Africa
Nepal	Keshu Khadka	28	Lalitpur	Asia
Netherlands	Serena Darder	22	Badhoevedorp	Europe
Nigeria	Adaeze Chineme	26	Umuahia	Africa
Panama	Cecilia Medina	29	Panama City	Americas
Paraguay	Violeta Van Humbeck	29	Hernandarias	Americas
Peru	Almendra Castillo	27	Lima	Americas
Philippines	Alison Black	23	Las Piñas	Asia
Poland	Agata Wdowiak	26	Łódź	Europe
Portugal	Ana Rita Aguiar	25	Vale de Cambra	Europe
Puerto Rico	Ariette Banchs	23	Ponce	Caribbean
Romania	Andra Tache	18	Brașov	Europe
Singapore	Jiayi Sin	23	Toa Payoh	Asia
Slovakia	Jana Vozarová	21	Púchov	Europe
South Africa	Lalela Mswane	25	Richards Bay	Africa
South Korea	Cheryun Song	20	Seoul	Asia
Spain	Ana Karla Ramírez	25	Málaga	Europe
Thailand	Praewwanich Ruangthong	29	Chumphon	Asia
Trinidad and Tobago	Christin Coeppicus	24	Princes Town	Caribbean
Turkey	Şira Sahilli	22	Istanbul	Europe
Ukraine	Diana Mironenko	28	Odesa	Europe
United States	Sofia Acosta	26	Miami	Americas
Uruguay	Ximena Bertinat	27	Colonia Valdense	Americas
Venezuela	Ismelys Velásquez	22	La Guaira	Americas
Vietnam	Nguyễn Huỳnh Kim Duyên	26	Cần Thơ	Asia
Zambia	Savena Mushinge	25	Lusaka	Africa
Zimbabwe	Kimberly Tatenda	24	Masvingo	Africa

== Notes ==
=== Debuts ===
- Cambodia
- Kyrgyzstan
- Lesotho

=== Returns ===
Last competed in 2012:

- Cuba

Last competed in 2013:

- Uruguay

Last competed in 2015:

- Curaçao
- Hong Kong

Last competed in 2017:

- Kazakhstan
- Zimbabwe

Last competed in 2018:

- Denmark
- Malaysia

Last competed in 2019:

- Argentina
- Costa Rica
- Côte d'Ivoire
- Guatemala
- Laos
- Mauritius
- Singapore
- Turkey
- Ukraine
- Vietnam
- Zambia

=== Withdrawals ===
- Albania
- Bahamas
- Guadeloupe
- Guyana
- Norway
- Russia - In light of the 2022 Russian invasion of Ukraine, the Miss Supranational organization barred Russia from competing.
- Rwanda - Charlotte Umulisa pulled put of the competition after the Rwandan government suspended all pageants in the country.
- Sierra Leone
- South Sudan
- Sweden
- Suriname
- Togo - Mathilde Honyiglo took part in Episode 3 of Supra Chat 2022 with no show in Poland and will instead compete in the following edition.
