= Daniel Snzile Ndima =

South African structural biologist

Daniel Senzile Ndima is a South African structural biologist of infectious diseases and bio-entrepreneur. His specialty is in genetic/protein engineering and protein crystallography. He is the founding CEO of CapeBio. He is an Allan Gray Orbis fellow and The Mandela Rhodes Scholar. The CapeBio company has developed a coronavirus testing kit. The kit is called qPCR. The Coronavirus test kits produce results in 65 minutes. Ndima says, "Our kits help pathologists isolate and identify a virus’s DNA or genetic material from an infected person. This makes it possible to detect the virus accurately in a laboratory".

== Early life and education ==
Ndima was born in Eastern Cape and grew up in Cape Town. He earned a bachelor's degree in biotechnology from University of the Western Cape. In 2016, he earned a master's degree in biochemistry from the University of Pretoria; his thesis was Investigating the Potentially Expanded Target Repertoire of Murinized Internalin of Listeria Monocytogenes.

== Career ==
Following graduation, he joined the Council for Scientific and Industrial Research as a researcher and business developer for CapeBio Initiative which ultimately became CapeBio Technologies. Ndima is an Allan Gray Orbis Foundation Fellow, and the founding CEO of CapeBio Technologies. The Allan Gray Orbis Foundation was founded by Allan Gray (investor). Ndima worked with a group of researchers at CSIR that developed reagents enzymes as business developer of the start-up and product developer. The company produces molecular biology reagents, enzymes and kits which are used at universities, research councils, and companies in South Africa and United States.

== Awards ==
- 2012 – Student Leadership Award 2012
- 2012 – Allan Gray Orbis Foundation Start-up summit winner
- 2013 – Vice-Rector's Outstanding Achievement Award
- 2015 – Mandela Rhodes Scholarship
- 2016 – Brightest Young Minds Alumnus
