= Miss South Africa 2020 =

Beauty pageant edition

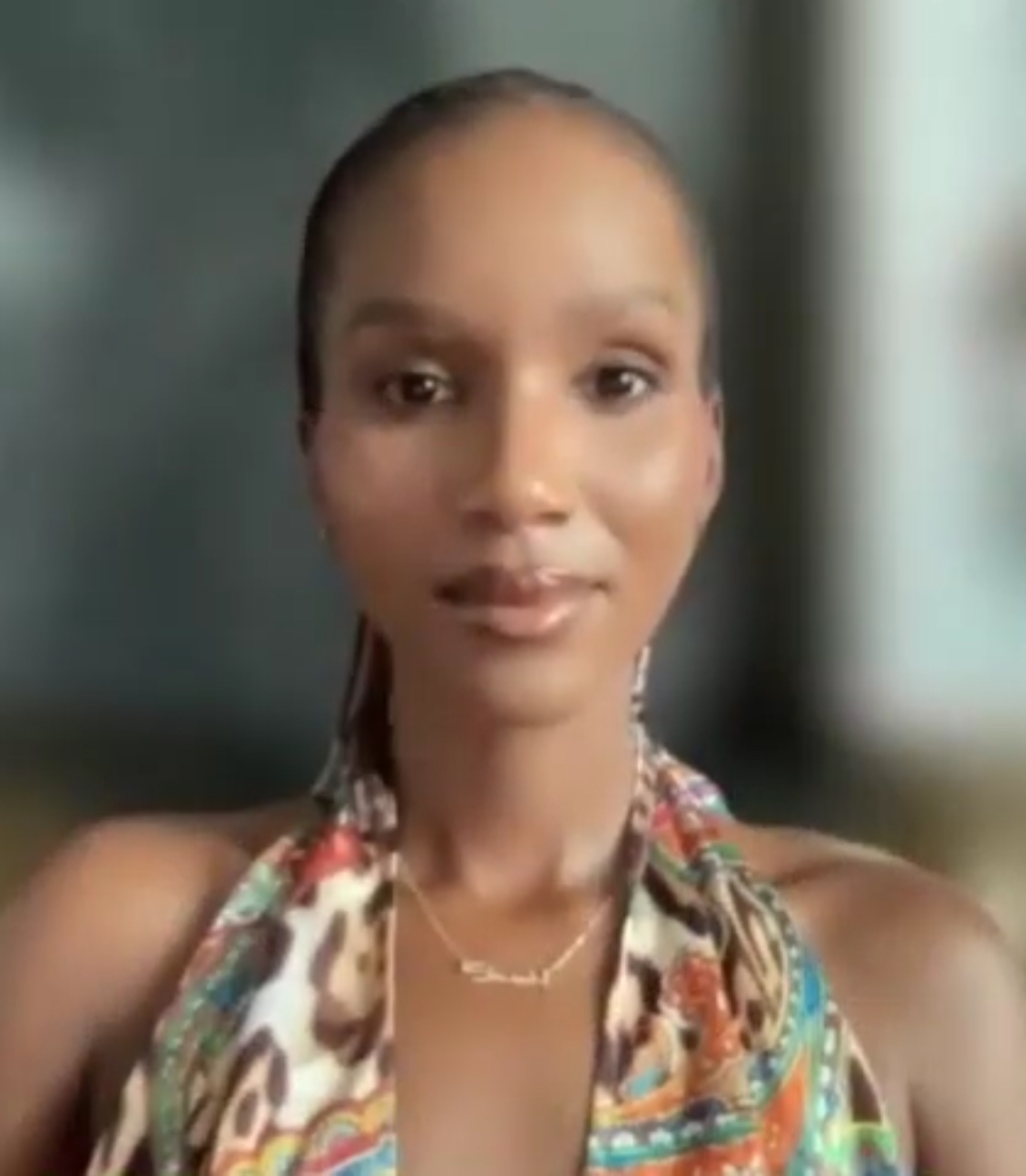
- Shudufhadzo Musida, Miss South Africa 2020
- Date: 24 October 2020
- Presenters: Nomzamo Mbatha; Tamaryn Green; Lalla Hirayama
- Entertainment: Mi Casa; Sho Madjozi; Ami Faku; Sun-El Musician; Jimmy Nevis
- Venue: The Table Bay Hotel, Cape Town
- Broadcaster: M-Net; DStv; Mzansi Magic; YouTube
- Entrants: 10
- Placements: 5
- Winner: Shudufhadzo Musida; Limpopo

Miss South Africa 2020 was the 62nd edition of the Miss South Africa pageant, held at The Table Bay Hotel in Cape Town, on the 24th of October 2020.

Sasha-Lee Olivier of Gauteng crowned Shudufhadzo Musida of Limpopo as her successor at the end of the event. She will represent South Africa at Miss World 2021. Musida, being the winner, also received prizes in excess of 3 million rand, including a car and one-year free stay in the Miss South Africa official apartment, located in Sandton, Johannesburg. First runner-up Thato Mosehle received 250,000 rand and represented South Africa at Miss Supranational 2021, second runner-up Natasha Joubert received 100,000 rand and represented South Africa at Miss Universe 2020.

== Results ==
=== Placements ===
Color keys

- The contestant was a Runner-up in an International pageant.
- The contestant was a Semi-Finalist in an International pageant.
- Unplaced

Placement	Contestant	International placement
Miss South Africa 2020	Limpopo – Shudufhadzo Musida	Top 40 – Miss World 2021
1st runner-up	North West – Thato Mosehle	2nd Runner-Up – Miss Supranational 2021
2nd runner-up	Gauteng – Natasha Joubert	Unplaced – Miss Universe 2020
Top 5	Eastern Cape – Melissa Nayimuli; Gauteng – Lebogang Mahlangu	

== Delegates ==
The top ten finalists were revealed on 5 August.

Name	Age	Province	Hometown	Placement
Aphelele Mbiyo	26	Eastern Cape	Port Elizabeth	
Busisiwe Esther Mmotla	27	Gauteng	Soweto	
Chantelle Pretorius	24	Gauteng	Pretoria	
Jordan van der Vyver	25	Western Cape	Durbanville	
Karishma Ramdev	25	KwaZulu-Natal	Chatsworth	
Lebogang Mahlangu	24	Gauteng	Soshanguve	Top 5
Melissa Nayimuli	24	Eastern Cape	Butterworth	Top 5
Natasha Joubert	23	Gauteng	Centurion	2nd Runner-Up
Thato Mosehle	25	North West	Stilfontein	1st Runner-Up
Shudufhadzo Musida	24	Limpopo	Ha-Masia	Miss South Africa 2020

=== Non-finalists ===
==== Top 15 ====
The top fifteen was revealed on 24 June. The following five delegates did not advance to the top ten.

Name	Age	Province	Hometown
Anarzade Omar	21	Gauteng	Johannesburg
Matsepo Sithole	21	KwaZulu-Natal	Pietermaritzburg
Olin-Shae De La Cruz	26	Gauteng	Sandton
Palesa Keswa	23	Free State	Sasolburg
Savannah Schutzler	24	Western Cape	Rondebosch

==== Top 35 ====
The top 35 was announced on 11 June 2020. The following 20 delegates did not advance to the top fifteen.

Delegate	Age	Province	Hometown
Anica Myburgh	27	Free State	Bethlehem
Carla Peters	20	Eastern Cape	Bethelsdorp
Gabriella Koopman	23	Gauteng	Sandton
Jamie Lee Harris	24	KwaZulu-Natal	Bluff
Kadija Makhanya	23	KwaZulu-Natal	Umlazi
Karabo Legodi	21	Gauteng	Soweto
Kayla Neilson	27	Gauteng	Meredale
Kea Mokorotlo	21	Free State	Bloemfontein
Lerato Manoko Malatji	25	Gauteng	Orange Farm
Lerato Siko	24	North West	Potchefstroom
Lesedi Phala	24	KwaZulu-Natal	Pietermaritzburg
Lindokuhle Mvango	24	Western Cape	George
Luvé Meyer	23	Western Cape	Brackenfell
Melvarene Theron	25	Gauteng	Eldorado Park
Nicole Wilmans	25	Western Cape	Stellenbosch
Nkosazana Sibobosi	24	Western Cape	Cape Town
Olorato Major	24	Northern Cape	Warrenton
Sherry Wang	25	Gauteng	Sunninghill
Shevon Pereira	23	Gauteng	Johannesburg
Stacy Gossayn	23	Free State	Viljoenskroon

== Judges ==
=== Semifinals ===
The following four judges determined the 35 entrants who made it to the semifinals.

- Anele Mdoda – Radio jockey
- Bokang Montjane-Tshabalala – Miss South Africa 2010
- Liesl Laurie – Miss South Africa 2015
- Adè van Heerden – Miss South Africa 2017

=== Finals ===
- Zozibini Tunzi - Miss South Africa 2019 and Miss Universe 2019
- Anele Mdoda - Award-winning television personality and radio jockey
- Peggy-Sue Khumalo - Miss South Africa 1996 and Chief Executive of Standard Bank Wealth South Africa
- Leandie du Randt - Actress, entrepreneur and motivational speaker
- Kim Engelbrecht - Actress
