= Nelson Mandela Foundation =

Non-profit organisation founded by Nelson Mandela

- Formation: 1999; 27 years ago
- Headquarters: Houghton Estate, Johannesburg, South Africa
- Chair: Njabulo Ndebele
- Website: www.nelsonmandela.org

The Nelson Mandela Foundation is a nonprofit organisation founded by Nelson Mandela in 1999 to promote Mandela's vision of freedom and equality for all. The chairman is Naledi Pandor, and the chief executive officer is Dr. Mbongiseni Buthelezi.

== Vision ==
The vision of the Nelson Mandela Foundation is to contribute to building a society that remembers its past, listens to all voices, and pursues social justice for all. Mandela established the Truth and Reconciliation Commission in South Africa, as well as measures to combat poverty and expand healthcare services. He also helped to lead the African National Congress (ANC) in their 1952 campaign and prompted the manifesto known as the Freedom Charter.

== History ==
The foundation was created in 1999 by Nelson Mandela when he stepped down as the president of South Africa.

In 2012, the foundation broke its usually apolitical positioning by criticising Jacob Zuma for weakening state institutions.

Following Robert Mugabe's attacks on the legacy of Nelson Mandela in 2017, the foundation responded by asking Mugabe to base his accusations on facts.

In 2024, the Nelson Mandela Foundation chose to collaborate with Google Arts & Culture for International Women's Day. They selected 24 South African women to feature in an online exhibition, and one of those was social worker Qaqamba Gubanca.

On 5 February 2026, the Nelson Mandela Foundation announced that it would be pooling resources to sponsor an aid flotilla to Gaza in March 2026. Speakers at the event announcing the new flotilla included Mandla Mandela.

== Annual lecture ==
The Nelson Mandela Foundation organises an annual lecture, inviting prominent figures to drive debate on significant social issues.

- 2003 – Bill Clinton
- 2004 – Desmond Tutu
- 2005 – Wangari Maathai
- 2006 – Thabo Mbeki
- 2007 – Kofi Annan
- 2008 – Ellen Johnson-Sirleaf
- 2009 – Muhammad Yunus
- 2010 – Ariel Dorfman
- 2011 – Ismail Serageldin
- 2012 – Mary Robinson
- 2013 – Mo Ibrahim
- 2014 – Michelle Bachelet
- 2015 – Thomas Piketty
- 2016 – Bill Gates
- 2017 – Amina J. Mohammed
- 2018 – Barack Obama
- 2019 – Mogoeng Mogoeng
- 2020 – António Guterres
- 2021 – Fatou Bensouda
- 2022 – Mia Mottley
- 2023 – Malala Yousafzai
- 2024 – Abdulrazak Gurnah
- 2025 – Francesca Albanese

== The Nelson Mandela Foundation Archive at the Centre Of Memory ==
The foundation hosts an archive of handwritten papers, official records and unique artefacts from Nelson Mandela at the Nelson Mandela Centre of Memory. The archive is also hosted digitally.

== See also ==
- Mandela Day
- Nelson Mandela Centre of Memory
