= Development Policy Review =

- Discipline: Planning and Development
- Language: English

Publication details
- History: 1966–present
- Publisher: Wiley-Blackwell, on behalf of the Overseas Development Institute
- Frequency: Quarterly
- Impact factor: 1.093 (2019)

Standard abbreviations
- ISO 4: Dev. Policy Rev.

Indexing
- ISSN: 0950-6764 (print); 1467-7679 (web)

Links
- Journal homepage; Online access

Development Policy Review is a peer-reviewed academic journal published by Wiley-Blackwell six times a year on behalf of the Overseas Development Institute (ODI). The journal was established in 1966 and focuses on the links between research and policy in international development, addressing contemporary questions from a range of disciplines across the social sciences.

According to the Journal Citation Reports, the journal has a 2011 impact factor of 1.522, ranking it 12th out of 54 journals in the category "Planning & Development".
