= Ndavi Nokeri =

South African beauty pageant titleholder (born 1999)

- Born: Ndavi Nokeri; 25 January 1999 (age 27); Tzaneen, Limpopo, South Africa
- Education: University of Pretoria
- Occupation: Model
- Height: 1.70 m (5 ft 7 in)
- Beauty pageant titleholder
- Title: Miss South Africa 2022
- Major competitions: Miss South Africa 2022; (Winner); Miss Universe 2022; (Top 16)

Ndavi Nokeri (born 25 January 1999) is a South African beauty pageant titleholder who was crowned Miss South Africa 2022 and represented South Africa at the Miss Universe 2022 and was placed in the Top 16.

== Pageantry ==
=== Miss South Africa 2022 ===
Nokeri began her pageantry career in 2022, after she entered the 64th edition of Miss South Africa and first made in the Top 30. In the finale on 13 August 2022, she was crowned the new Miss South Africa 2022 preceded by Lalela Mswane. As Miss South Africa, she represented the country using her platform to advocate for education, youth empowerment and equal opportunities for women in rural areas.

=== Miss Universe 2022 ===
In 2023, Nokeri continued with her pageantry journey when representing her country South Africa at the Miss Universe 2022. The finale was held in New Orleans, United States and was placed in the Top 16.

Awards and achievements
Preceded by Lalela Mswane	Miss South Africa; 2022	Succeeded by Natasha Joubert
Preceded by Lalela Mswane	Miss Universe South Africa; 2022	Succeeded by Bryoni Govender
