= Lalela Mswane =

South African beauty queen, Miss South Africa 2021

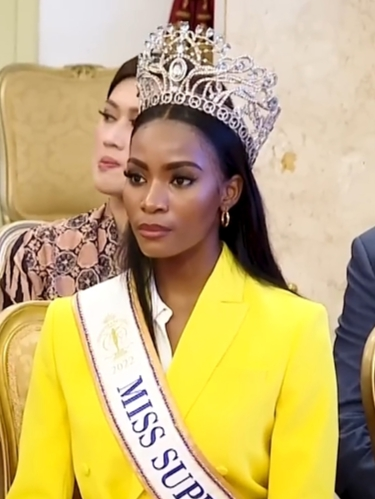
- Mswane in 2023
- Born: Lalela Lali Mswane; 27 March 1997 (age 29); Richards Bay, South Africa
- Education: University of Pretoria (LLB)
- Height: 1.72 m (5 ft 8 in)
- Beauty pageant titleholder
- Title: Miss South Africa 2021; Miss Supranational 2022
- Hair color: Black
- Eye color: Brown
- Major competitions: Miss South Africa 2021; (Winner); Miss Universe 2021; (2nd Runner-Up); Miss Supranational 2022; (Winner)

Lalela Lali Mswane (born 27 March 1997) is a South African beauty pageant titleholder who won Miss Supranational 2022. She previously won Miss South Africa 2021 and was second runner up at Miss Universe 2021.

== Early life and education ==
Mswane was born 27 March 1997 in Richards Bay, in the KwaZulu-Natal province of South Africa. Her father, Muntu Mswane, was an Eswatini-born former diplomat and minister who died in 2010, while her mother Hleliselwe worked as an accounts clerk and homemaker. She is the youngest of three children, having an elder brother and sister. After completing her secondary education at Pro Arte Alphen Park in 2015, Mswane enrolled in the University of Pretoria, later graduating with a Bachelor of Laws degree.

Prior to becoming Miss South Africa, Mswane worked as a professional model signed to the South African modeling agency Alushi Models.

== Pageantry ==
Mswane began her pageantry career at the Matric Experience 2015 pageant, where she was the first runner-up.

=== Miss South Africa 2021 ===
Mswane won Miss South Africa 2021 on 16 October, at Grand West Arena in Cape Town.

On 6 July 2021, Mswane was announced as one of the 30 competitors for Miss South Africa 2021. Following a series of interviews and public voting, she was announced on 3 August as one of the ten semifinalists who would appear at the televised finale. As Miss South Africa, Mswane received an array of prizes and rewards, including R1 million, a one-year residence in a fully furnished apartment in Sandton, a one-year lease on a Mercedes-Benz C-Class, and the opportunity to represent South Africa at Miss Universe 2021.

=== Miss Universe 2021 ===
Mswane received widespread criticism within South Africa for agreeing to compete in Miss Universe 2021, which was set to be held in Israel, due to the Israeli–Palestinian conflict. Despite the criticism, the official Instagram account for Miss South Africa confirmed in a post with comments disabled, that Mswane would still be competing. It said: "We are not a political organisation and The Miss Universe pageant is not a politically inspired event." On 14 November 2021, the government of South Africa withdrew its support to Mswane to compete at Miss Universe 2021. On 27 November, Mswane posted on her Instagram account that she had decided to participate in Miss Universe after weeks of absence. On 13 December 2021, Mswane competed at Miss Universe and ended up as second runner-up.

=== Miss Supranational 2022 ===
On 15 February 2022, the Miss SA Organization announced that Mswane would represent South Africa at the 13th edition of Miss Supranational. During the pageant's preliminary activities, Mswane reached the top 10 at Supra Fan Vote, top 22 at Supra Influencer, and top 11 at Supra Model of the Year. At the pageant, she won the competition, becoming the first black woman and South African to win the title. Her victory also marked a back-to-back win for Africa.

Awards and achievements
Preceded by (Namibia) Chanique Rabe	Miss Supranational; 2022	Succeeded by (Ecuador) Andrea Aguilera
Preceded by (Peru) Janick Maceta	Miss Universe 2nd Runner-Up; 2021	Succeeded by (Dominican Republic) Andreína Martínez
Preceded by Thato Mosehle	Miss Supranational South Africa; 2022	Succeeded by Ayanda Gugulethu Thabethe
Preceded by Natasha Joubert	South African delegate to Miss Universe; 2021	Succeeded by Ndavi Nokeri
Preceded by Shudufhadzo Musida	Miss South Africa; 2021	Succeeded by Ndavi Nokeri
