= Shudufhadzo Musida =

South African beauty titleholder, Miss South Africa 2020

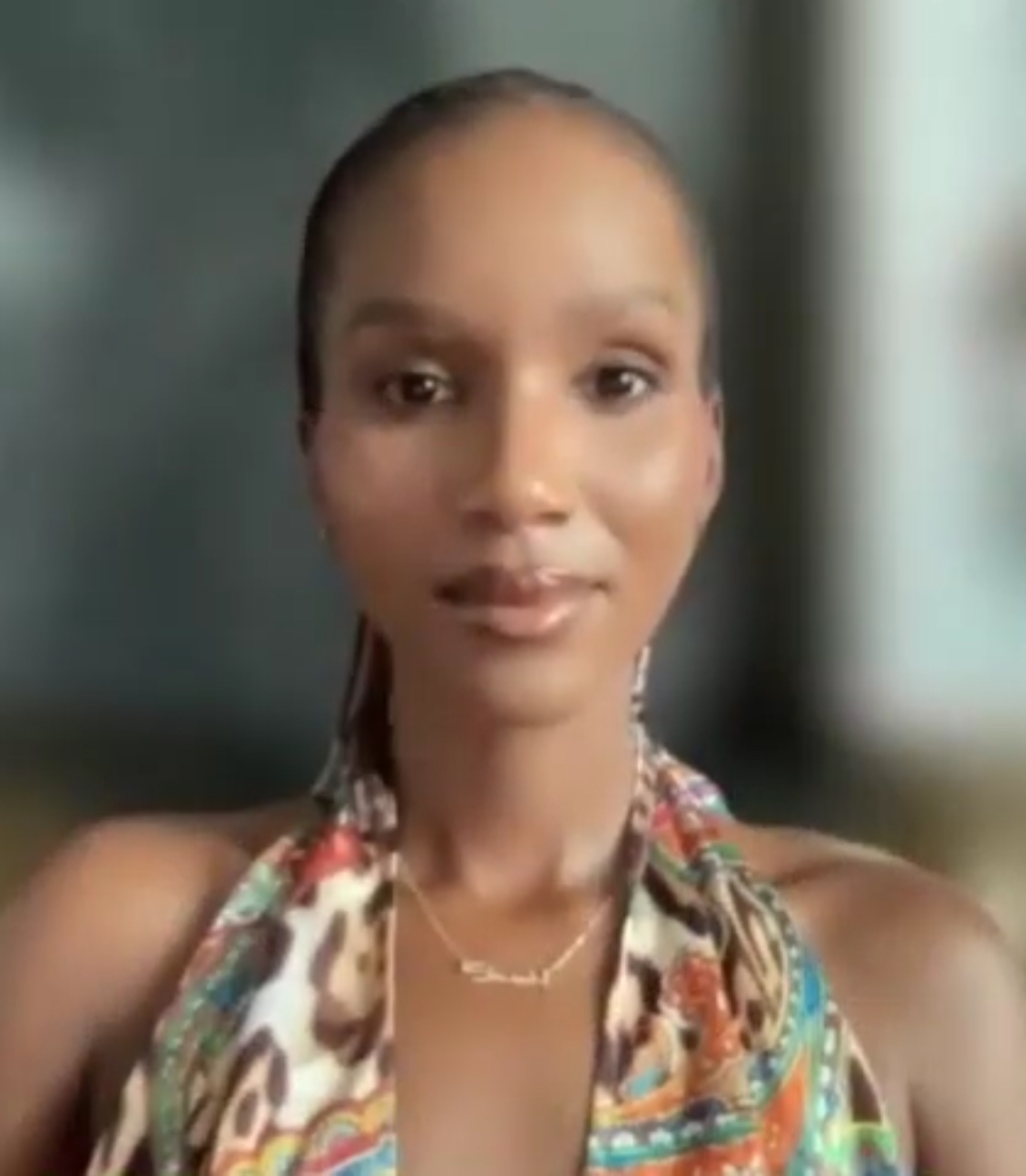
- Musida in 2024
- Born: Shudufhadzo Abigail Musida; 18 July 1996 (age 30); Ha-Masia, Limpopo, South Africa
- Education: University of Pretoria; University of the Witwatersrand; Columbia University
- Height: 1.74 m (5 ft 8 1/2 in)
- Beauty pageant titleholder
- Title: Miss South Africa 2020
- Hair color: Black
- Eye color: Brown
- Major competitions: Miss South Africa 2020; (Winner); Miss World 2022; (Top 40)

Shudufhadzo Musida (born 18 July 1996) is a South African model and beauty pageant titleholder who was crowned Miss South Africa 2020. She is the second title holder from the province of Limpopo, the first being Bokang Montjane.

She is the first title holder whose first language is Tshivenda, and was selected to represent South Africa in Miss World 2022. She was placed in the top 40. Musida is the first bald woman to win Miss South Africa. She is a dedicated advocate and spokeswoman for mental health awareness and empowering women and children.

== Early life ==
Shudufhadzo Musida was born on 18 July 1996. She is from Ha-Masia village, Vhembe District Municipality of the Limpopo province. Musida studied at the University of Pretoria where she earned a Bachelor of Social Science degree in philosophy, Politics and Economics. Before winning Miss South Africa, she was completing an Honours degree in International Relations at the University of Witwatersrand. She is one of two sisters; her mother Thandi is a real estate agent. She values her Venda heritage and enjoys traditional Venda cuisine.

== Career ==
In October 2020, at the Miss South Africa finals held at Table Bay Hotel in Cape Town, Musida won the crown. Before the finals, she had won the public vote. Prizes for winning the final included 1 million rand, and use of a fully furnished Sandton apartment and a Mercedes-Benz C200 Cabriolet for one year. Musida is an advocate for mental health awareness and the educational and economic empowerment of children and women. Former Miss South Africa and Miss Universe 2019 Zozibini Tunzi is cited as a role model by Musida. She competed and represented South Africa and finished in the top 40 of the Miss World 2022 pageant.

Awards and achievements
Preceded by Sasha-Lee Olivier	Miss South Africa; 2020	Succeeded by Lalela Mswane
