= White South Africans =

South African citizens of European ancestry

Wit Suid-Afrikaners (Afrikaans)
- Proportion of White South Africans in each municipality according to the census

Total population
- 4,504,252 (2022 census); 7.30% of the South African population

Regions with significant populations
- Throughout South Africa and the diaspora, but mostly concentrated in urban areas. Population by provinces, as of the 2022 census
- Gauteng: 1,509,800
- Western Cape: 1,217,807
- KwaZulu-Natal: 513,377
- Eastern Cape: 403,061
- Free State: 235,915
- Mpumalanga: 185,731
- North West: 171,887
- Limpopo: 167,524
- Northern Cape: 99,150

Languages
- Majority: Afrikaans; Minority: English · German · Italian · Portuguese · Greek · Dutch · French

Religion
- Majority: Christianity (largely Protestantism); Minority: Judaism · Irreligion

Related ethnic groups
- Europeans; White Namibians; White Zimbabweans; White Americans; White Argentines; White Australians; White Canadians; Others

White South Africans are South Africans of European descent. In linguistic, cultural, and historical terms, they are generally divided into the Afrikaans-speaking descendants of the Dutch East India Company's original colonists, known as Afrikaners, and the Anglophone descendants of predominantly British colonists of South Africa. White South Africans are by far the largest population of White Africans. White was a legally defined racial classification under apartheid.

White settlement in South Africa began with Dutch colonisation in 1652, followed by British colonisation in the 19th century, which led to tensions and further expansion inland by Boer settlers. Throughout the 19th and 20th centuries, waves of immigrants from Europe contributed to the growth of the white population, which peaked in the mid-1990s. Under apartheid, strict racial classifications enforced a legal and economic order that privileged the white minority. Post-apartheid reforms such as Black Economic Empowerment had the goal of redistributing business opportunities and market access to previously disadvantaged groups, prompting reports of newfound economic vulnerability among some white South Africans as material advantages and disadvantages were beginning to be brought to light. Since the early 1990s, a large number of white South Africans have emigrated, due to concerns over crime and employment prospects, with a number returning in subsequent years. The white population in South Africa peaked between 1989 and 1995 at around 5.2 to 5.6 million due to high birth rates and immigration, then declined until the mid-2000s before experiencing a modest increase from 2006 to 2013. It has been declining since.

As of the 2022 census, white South Africans make up 7.3% of the population, predominantly speak Afrikaans (61%) or English (36%), mostly identify as Christian (87%), and are unevenly distributed with the highest concentrations in Western Cape and Gauteng provinces. Former South African leaders have made controversial statements about Afrikaners’ identity and race relations, while apartheid enforced white minority rule and granted “honorary white” status to certain Asian immigrants and some African Americans. In South Africa, the legacy of apartheid continues to shape racial and economic dynamics.

The majority of Afrikaans-speaking (Afrikaners) and English-speaking White South Africans trace their ancestry to the 17th and 18th-century Dutch colonists or the 1820 British colonists. Other colonists included Huguenots who emigrated from France, and Walloons who emigrated from present-day Belgium. The remainder of the White South African population consists of later immigrants from Lebanon, and Europe such as Greeks and Norwegians. Portuguese immigrants arrived after the collapse of the Portuguese colonial administrations in Angola and Mozambique, although many also originate from Madeira.

== History ==
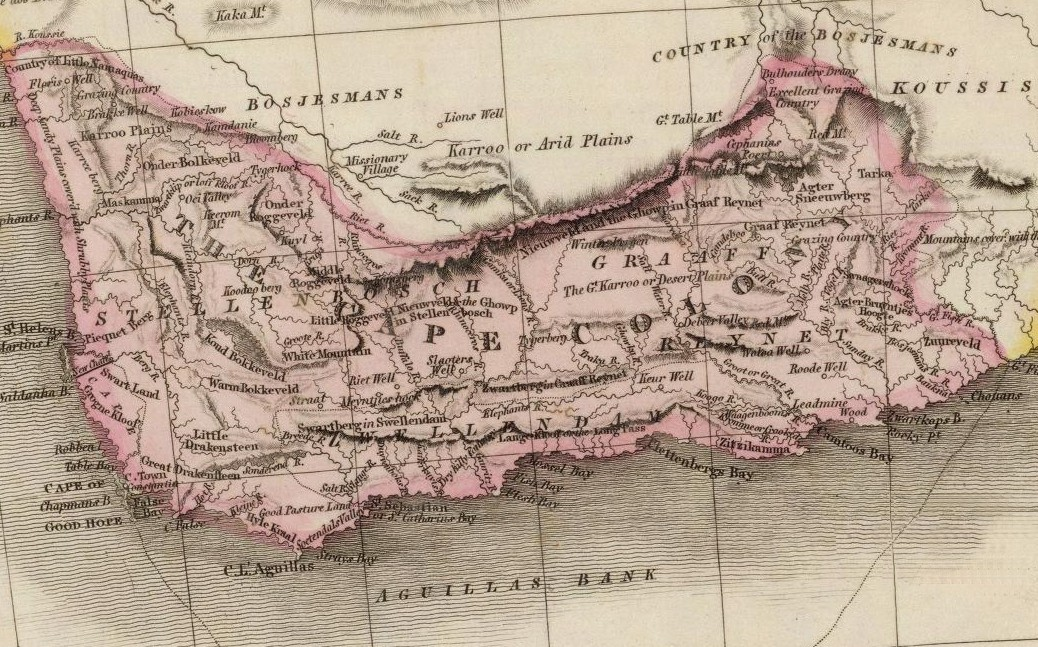
Map of the Cape Colony (now Western Cape) in 1809

Portuguese explorer Bartolomeu Dias was the first European to explore Southern Africa (the Cape of Good Hope and the Cape Agulhas) in 1488.

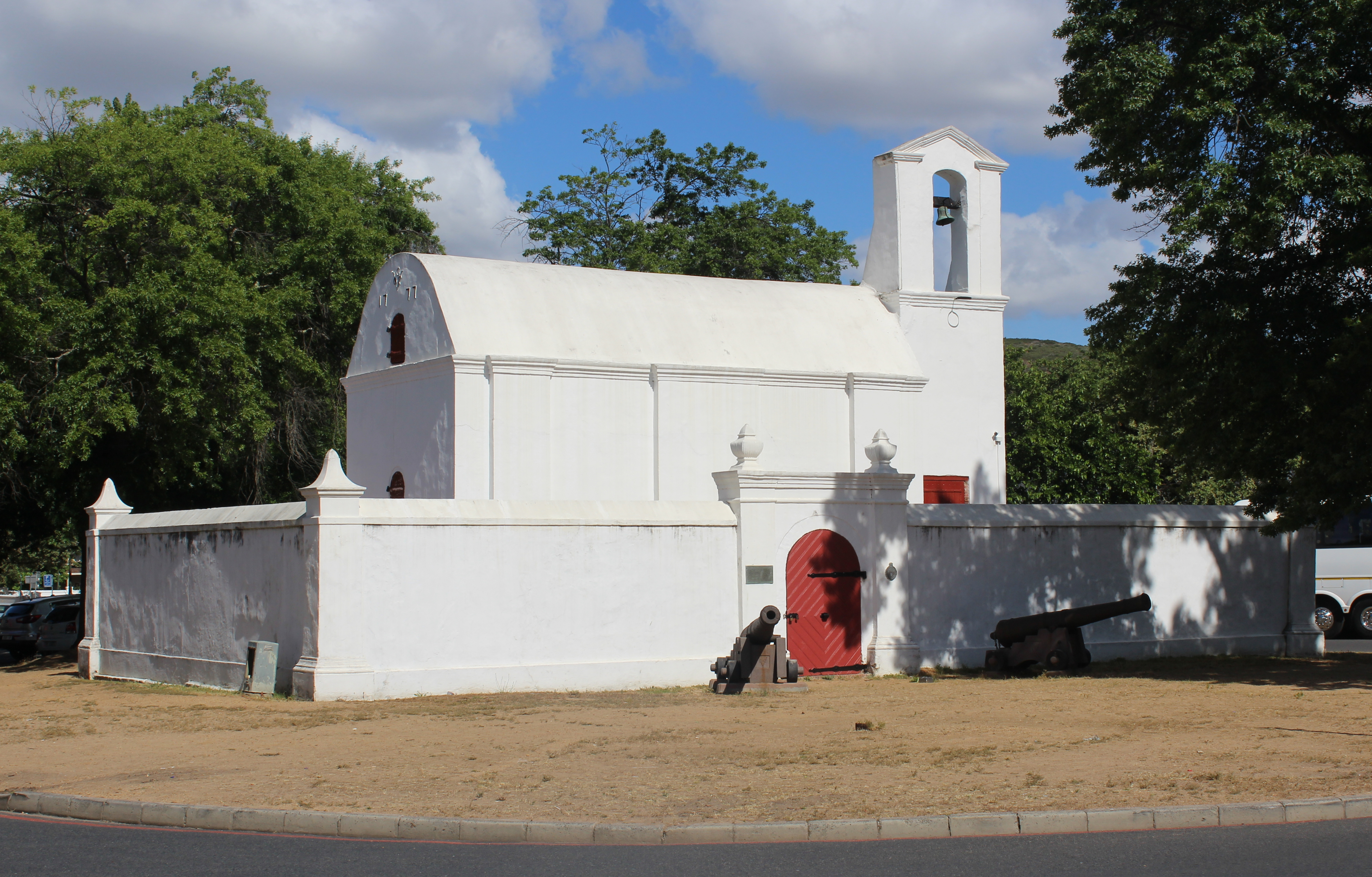
Powder Magazine at Stellenbosch built by the Dutch East India Company between 1776 and 1777

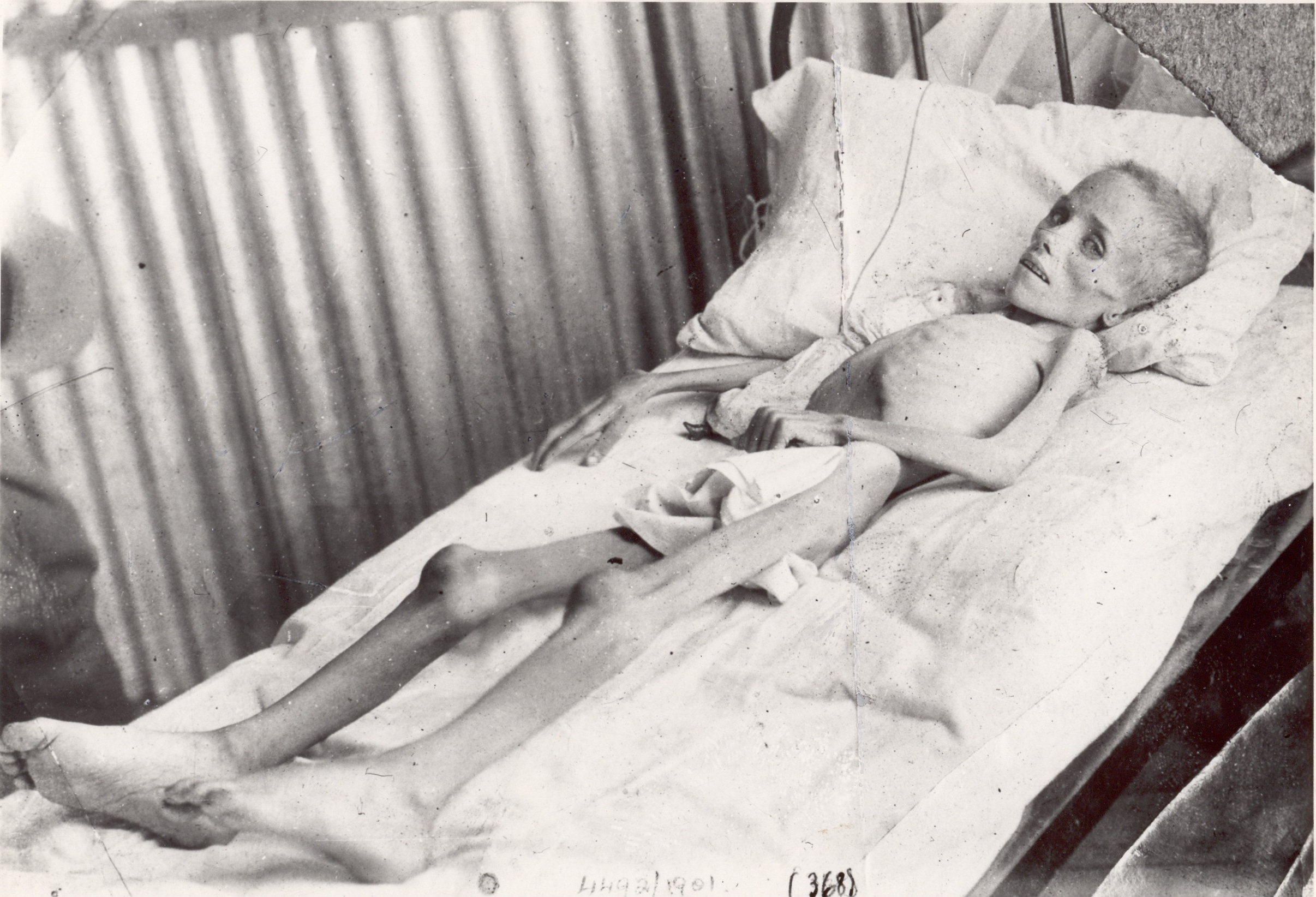
Lizzie van Zyl, a Boer child, in a British concentration camps in 1901

The history of white settlement in South Africa started in 1652 with the settlement of the Cape of Good Hope by the Dutch East India Company (VOC) under Jan van Riebeeck. Despite the preponderance of officials and colonists from the Netherlands, there were also a number of French Huguenots fleeing religious persecution at home and German soldiers or sailors returning from service in Asia. The Cape Colony remained under Dutch rule for two more centuries, after which it was annexed by the United Kingdom around 1806. At that time, South Africa was home to about 26,000 people of European ancestry, a relative majority of whom were still of Dutch origin. However, the Dutch settlers grew into conflict with the British government over the abolition of the Cape Colony slave trade and limits on colonial expansion into African lands. In order to prevent a frontier war, the British Parliament decided to send British settlers to start farms on the eastern frontier. Beginning in 1818 thousands of British settlers arrived in the growing Cape Colony, intending to join the local workforce or settle directly on the frontier. Ironically most of the farms failed due to the difficult terrain, forcing the British settlers to encroach on African land in order to practise pastoralism. About a fifth of the Cape's original Dutch-speaking white population migrated eastwards during the Great Trek in the 1830s and established their own autonomous Boer republics further inland. Nevertheless, the population of white ancestry (mostly European origin) continued increasing in the Cape as a result of settlement, and by 1865 had reached 181,592 people. Between 1880 and 1910, there was an influx of Jews (mainly via Lithuania) and immigrants from Lebanon and Syria arriving in South Africa. Recent immigrants from the Levant region of Western Asia were originally classified as Asian, and thus "non-white", but, in order to have the right to purchase land, they successfully argued that they were "white". The main reason being that they were Caucasian and from the lands in which Christianity and Judaism originated, and that the race laws did not target Jews, who were also a Semitic people. Therefore, arguing that if the laws targeted other people from the Levant, it should also affect the Jews.

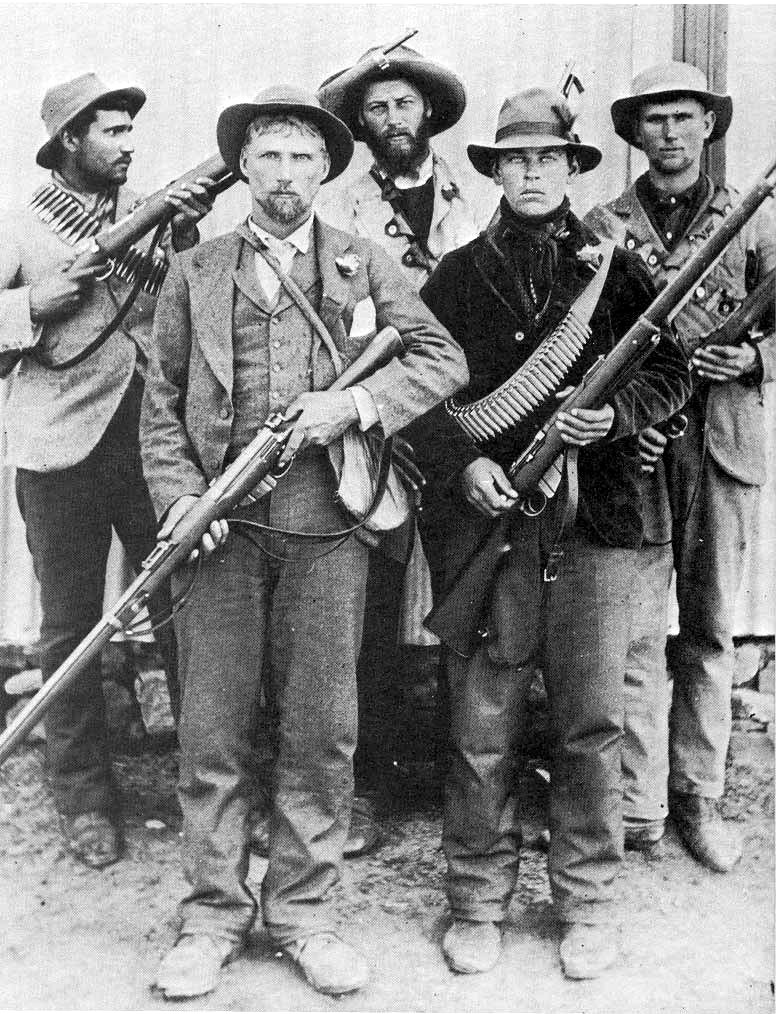
Boer guerrillas during the Second Boer War.

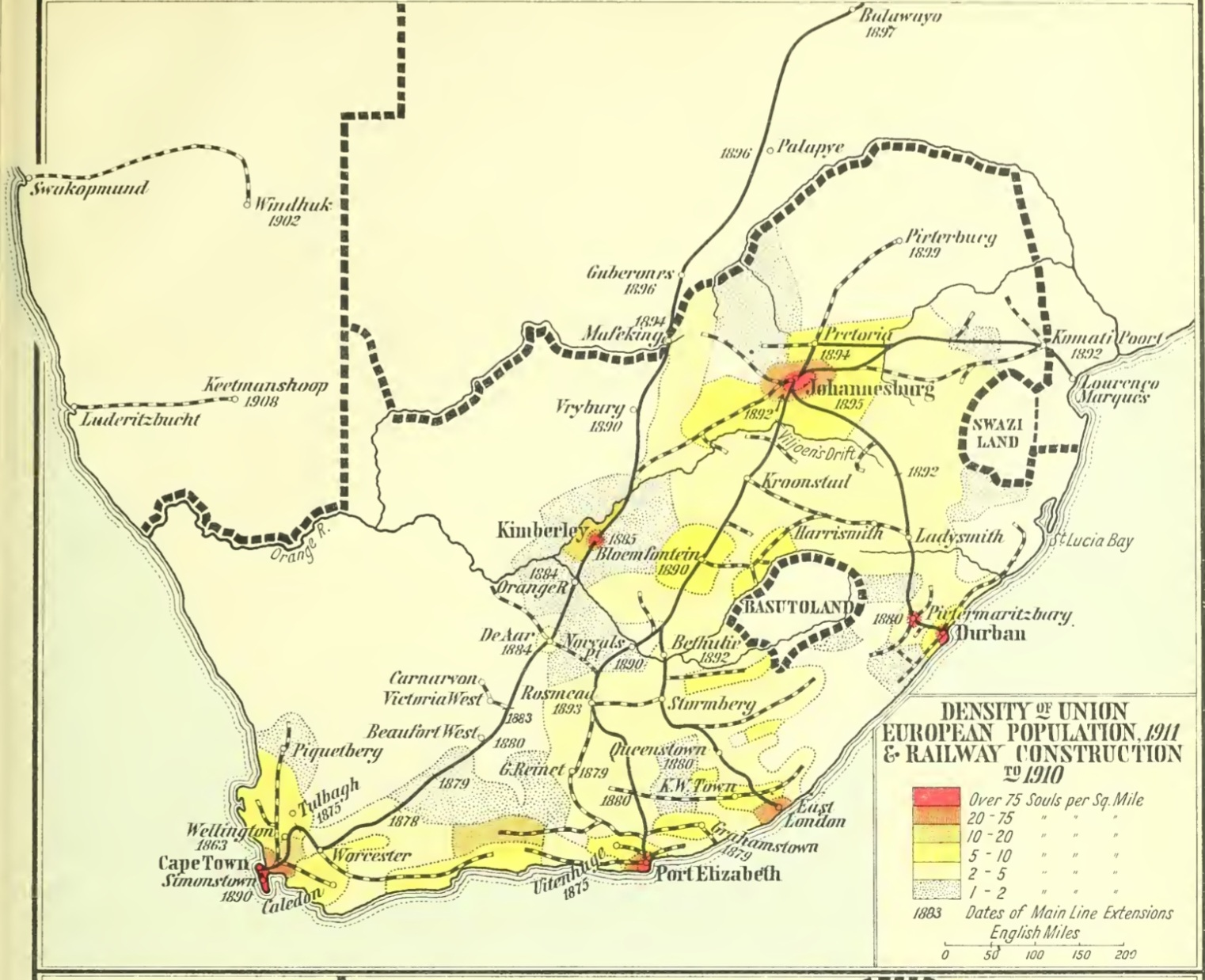
Density of White South Africans by district in 1922. These were concentrated primarily in Pretoria (former capital of the Transvaal), Cape Town (former capital of the Cape Colony) and Port Elizabeth, as well as in the surrounding regions.

The first nationwide census in South Africa was held in 1911 and indicated a white population of 1,276,242. By 1936, there were an estimated 2,003,857 white South Africans, and by 1946 the number had reached 2,372,690. The country began receiving tens of thousands of European immigrants, namely from Germany, Italy, the Netherlands, Greece, and the territories of the Portuguese Empire during the mid- to late twentieth century. South Africa's white population increased to over 3,408,000 by 1965, reached 4,050,000 in 1973, and peaked at 5,244,000 in 1994–95.

The number of white South Africans resident in their home country began gradually declining between 1990 and the mid-2000s as a result of increased emigration.

=== Apartheid era ===
White South African folk dancers at Utrecht, Netherlands in 1953

Under the Population Registration Act of 1950, each inhabitant of South Africa was classified into one of several different race groups, of which White was one. The Office for Race Classification defined a white person as one who "in appearance obviously is, or who is generally accepted as a white person, but does not include a person who, although in appearance obviously a white person, is generally accepted as a coloured person." Many criteria, both physical (e.g. examination of head and body hair) and social (e.g. eating and drinking habits, a native speaker of English, Afrikaans or another European language) were used when the board decided to classify someone as white or coloured. The Act was repealed on 17 June 1991.

=== Post–apartheid era ===
Flag of South Africa used during the Apartheid era (1928–1994)

Flag of South Africa used after the Apartheid era as the Rainbow Nation (since 1994)

Black Economic Empowerment legislation further empowers blacks as the government considers ownership, employment, training and social responsibility initiatives, which empower black South Africans, as important criteria when awarding tenders; private enterprises also must adhere to this legislation. Some reports indicate a growing number of whites in poverty compared to the pre-apartheid years and attribute this to such laws – a 2006 article in The Guardian stated that over 350,000 Afrikaners may be classified as poor, and alluded to research claiming that up to 150,000 were struggling for survival.

As a consequence of Apartheid policies, Whites are still widely regarded as being one of 4 defined race groups in South Africa. These groups (blacks, whites, Coloureds and Indians) still tend to have strong racial identities, and to identify themselves, and others, as members of these race groups and the classification continues to persist in government policy due to attempts at redress like Black Economic Empowerment and Employment Equity.

=== Diaspora and emigration ===
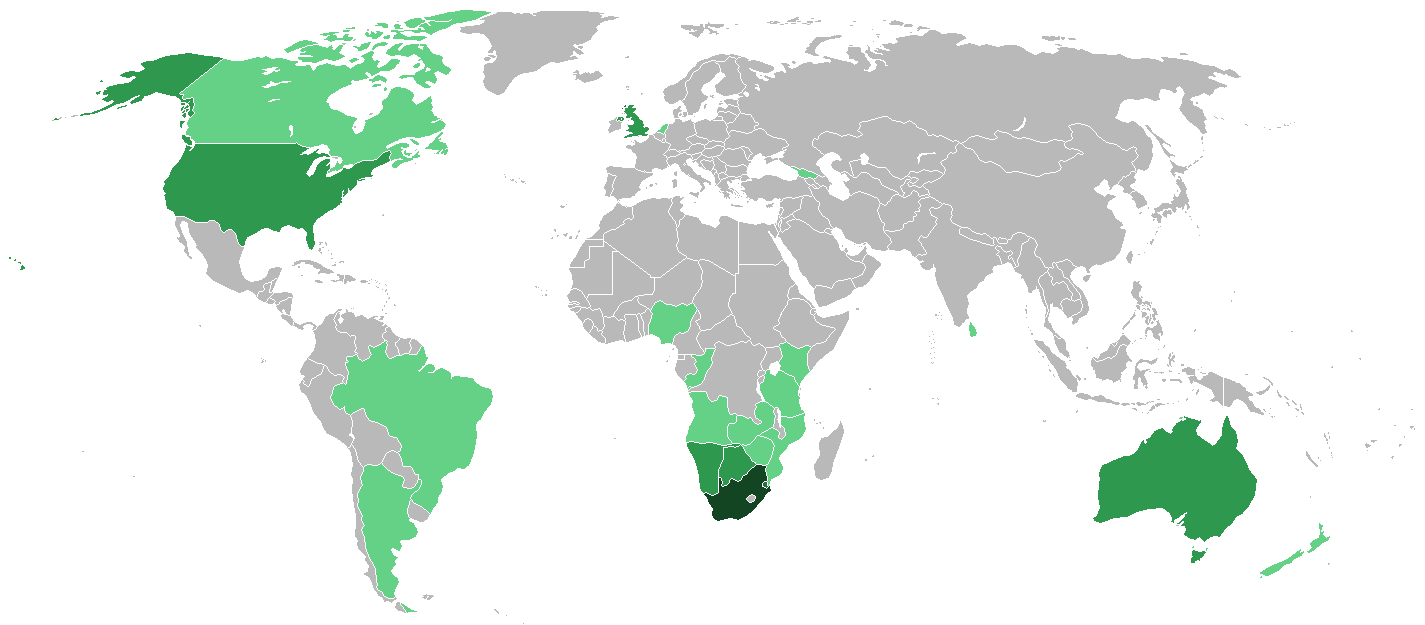
The Afrikaner diaspora went mainly to the United States, Argentina, Canada and Australia

Since the 1990s, there has been a significant emigration of whites from South Africa. Between 1995 and 2005, more than one million South Africans emigrated, citing violence as the main reason, as well as the lack of employment opportunities for whites.

=== Current trends ===
In recent decades, there has been a steady proportional decline in South Africa's white community, due to higher birthrates among other South African ethnic groups, as well as a high rate of emigration. In 1977, there were 4.3 million whites, constituting 16.4% of the population at the time. As of 2008, it was estimated that at least 800,000 white South Africans had emigrated since 1995.

Like many other communities strongly affiliated with the West and Europe's colonial legacy in Africa, white South Africans were in the past often economically better off than their black African neighbours and have surrendered political dominance to majority rule. There were also some white Africans in South Africa who lived in poverty—especially during the 1930s and increasingly since the end of minority rule. Current estimates of white poverty in South Africa run as high as 12%, though fact-checking website Africa Check described these figures as "grossly inflated" and suggested that a more accurate estimate was that "only a tiny fraction of the white population – as few as 7,754 households – are affected."

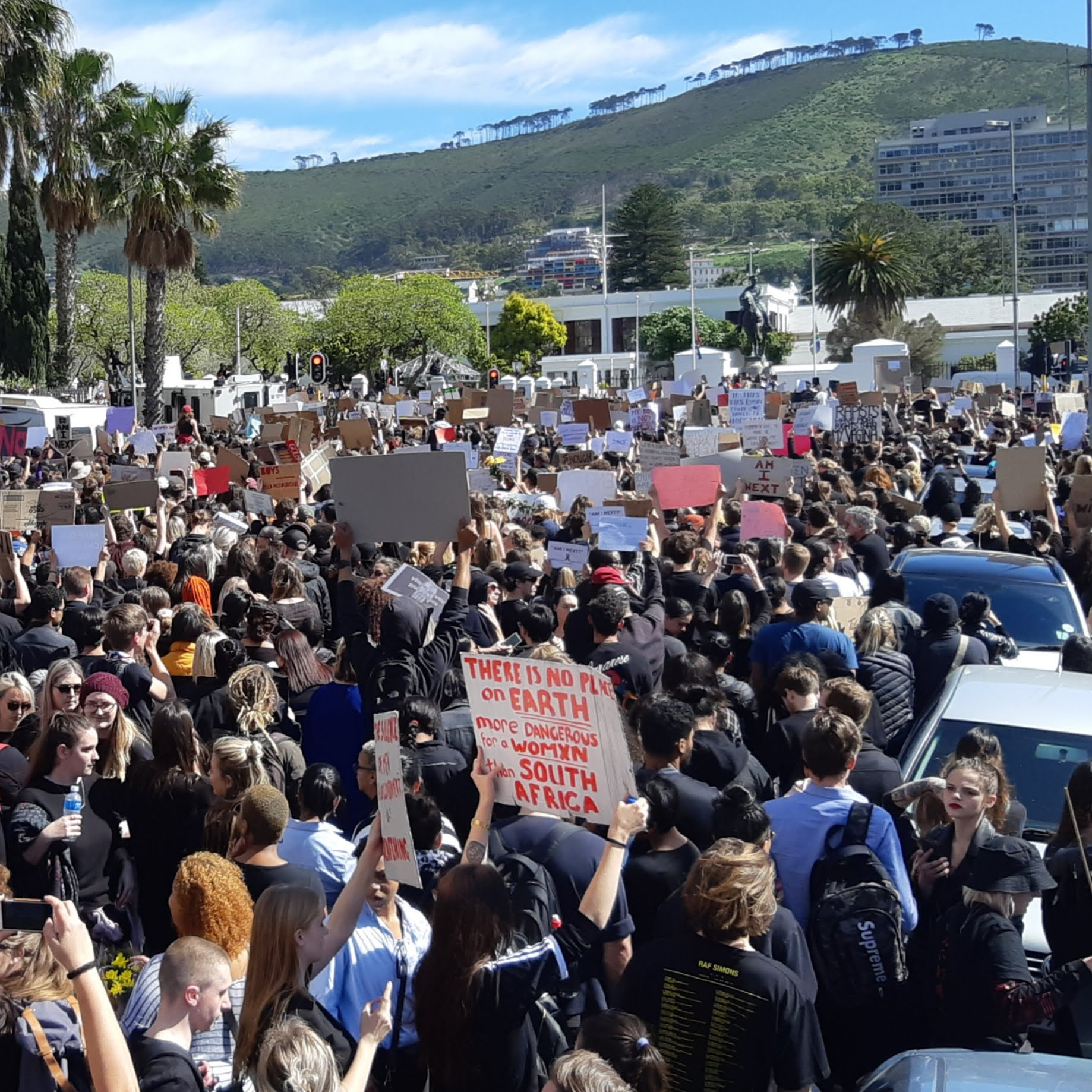
White South Africans protest against gender based violence and femicide outside Houses of Parliament in Cape Town

The new phenomenon of white poverty is mostly blamed on the government's affirmative action employment legislation, which reserves 80% of new jobs for black people and favours companies owned by black people (see Black Economic Empowerment). In 2010, Reuters stated that 450,000 whites live below the poverty line according to Solidarity and civil organisations, with some research saying that up to 150,000 are struggling for survival. However, the proportion of white South Africans living in poverty is still much lower than for other groups in the country, since approximately 50% of the general population fall below the upper-bound poverty line.

A further concern has been crime. Some white South Africans living in affluent white suburbs, such as Sandton, have been affected by the 2008 13.5% rise in house robberies and associated crime. In a study, Johan Burger, senior researcher at the Institute for Security Studies (ISS), said that criminals were specifically targeting wealthier suburbs. Burger explained that several affluent suburbs are surrounded by poorer residential areas and that inhabitants in the latter often target inhabitants in the former. The report also found that residents in wealthy suburbs in Gauteng were not only at more risk of being targeted but also faced an inflated chance of being murdered during the robbery.

The 2008 financial crisis slowed the high rates of white people emigrating overseas and has led to increasing numbers of white emigrants returning to live in South Africa. Charles Luyckx, CEO of Elliot International and a board member of the Professional Movers Association, stated in December 2008 that emigration numbers had dropped by 10% in the six months prior. Meanwhile, "people imports" had increased by 50%.

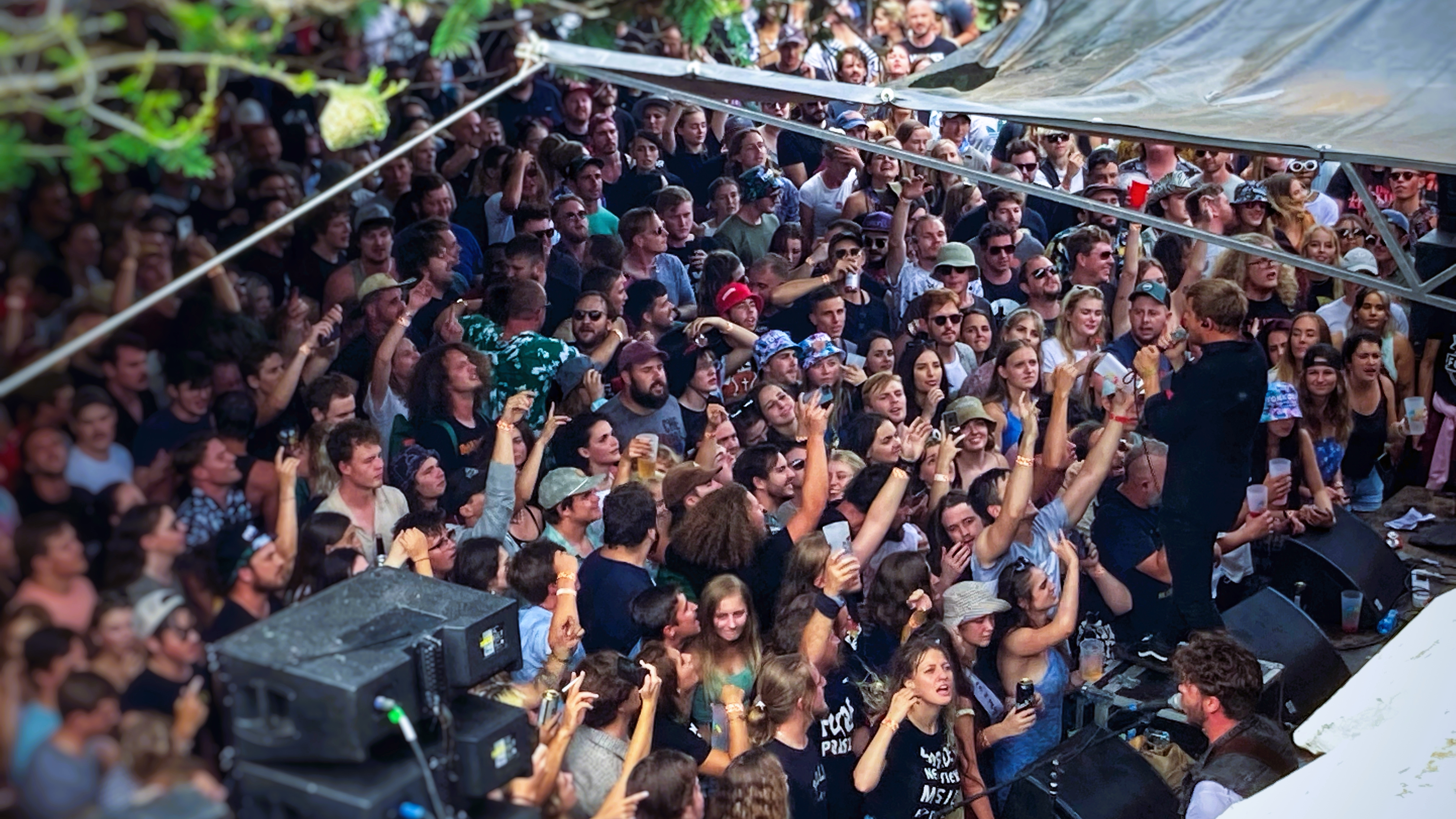
Afrikaners in Pretoria

In May 2014, Homecoming Revolution estimated that around 340,000 white South Africans had returned to South Africa in the preceding decade.

Furthermore, immigration from Europe has also supplemented the white population. The 2011 census found that 63,479 white people living in South Africa were born in Europe; of these, 28,653 had moved to South Africa since 2001.

At the end of apartheid in 1994, 85% of South Africa's arable land was owned by whites. The land reform program introduced after the end of apartheid intended that, within 20 years, 30% of white-owned commercial farm land should be transferred to black owners. Thus, in 2011, the farmers' association, Agri South Africa, coordinated efforts to resettle farmers throughout the African continent. The initiative offered millions of hectares from 22 African countries that hoped to spur development of efficient commercial farming. The 30 percent target was not close to being met by the 2014 deadline. According to a 2017 government audit, 72% of the nation's private farmland is owned by white people. In February 2018, the Parliament of South Africa passed a motion to review the property ownership clause of the constitution, to allow for the expropriation of land, in the public interest, without compensation, which was supported within South Africa's ruling African National Congress on the grounds that the land was originally seized by whites without just compensation. In August 2018, the South African government began the process of taking two white-owned farmlands. Western Cape ANC secretary Faiez Jacobs referred to the property clause amendment as a "stick" to force dialogue about the transfer of land ownership, with the hope of accomplishing the transfer "in a way that is orderly and doesn't create a 'them' and 'us' [situation]."

In 2025, 59 white South Africans arrived in the United States after U.S. president Donald Trump granted them refugee status.

Between October 2025 and March 2026, 4,499 refugees were admitted into the United States; all but three were white South Africans, with over half arriving in February and March.

== Demographics ==
White South Africans 1904–2022
Year	Population	% of South Africa
1904	1,116,805	21.58%
1921	1,519,488 ▲	▲21.93%
1936	2,003,857 ▲	▼20.90%
1960	3,088,492 ▲	▼19.30%
1970	3,792,848 ▲	▼16.86%
1995	5,224,000 ▲	▼12.70%
1996	4,434,697 ▼	▼11.00%
2001	4,293,640 ▼	▼9.60%
2011	4,586,838 ▲	▼8.90%
2022	4,504,252 ▼	▼7.30%
Source: South African census

White South Africans as a proportion of the total population: 0–20%; 20–40%; 40–60%; 60–80%; 80–100%

White South Africans by their native tongue
Language	Percent
Afrikaans	61%
English	36%

According to the 2022 South African census, white South Africans make 7.3% of South Africa's population. The province with the highest percentage of white population is Western Cape at 16.4%, while the white population is below 5% in Limpopo, Mpumalanga, KwaZulu-Natal and North West.

The Statistics South Africa Census 2011 showed that there were about 4,586,838 white people in South Africa, amounting to 8.9% of the country's population. This was a 6.8% increase since the 2001 census. According to the Census 2011, Afrikaans was the first language of 61% of White South Africans, while English was the first language of 36%. The majority of white South Africans identify themselves as primarily South African, regardless of their first language or ancestry.

=== Religion ===
Religion among White South Africans
Religion	Percent
Christianity	87%
Irreligious	9%
Other	3%
Judaism	1%

Approximately 87% of white South Africans are Christian, 9% are irreligious, and 1% are Jewish. The largest Christian denomination is the Dutch Reformed Church (NGK), with 23% of the white population being members. Other significant denominations are the Methodist Church (8%), the Roman Catholic Church (7%), and the Anglican Church (6%).

=== Migrations ===
Meanwhile, many white South Africans have also emigrated to Western countries over the past two decades, mainly to English-speaking countries such as the United Kingdom, Australia and New Zealand. However, the 2008 financial crisis slowed the rate of emigration and in May 2014, the Homecoming Revolution estimated that around 340,000 white South Africans had returned in the preceding decade.

=== Distribution ===
Density of the White South African population.: <1 /km²; 1–3 /km²; 3–10 /km²; 10–30 /km²; 30–100 /km²; 100–300 /km²; 300–1000 /km²; 1000–3000 /km²; >3000 /km²

South Africa 2001 linguistic distribution of white people map. Blue = Afrikaans. Red = English

According to Statistics South Africa, white South Africans comprised 7.7% of the total population of South Africa in 2022. Their proportional share in municipalities may be higher than census figures indicate, given an undercount in the 2001 census.

The following table shows the distribution of white people by province, according to the 2011 census:

Province	White pop. (2001)	White pop. (2011)	White pop. (2022)	% province (2001)	% province (2011)	% province (2022)	change 2001–2011	change 2011–2022	% total whites (2011)	% total whites (2022)
Eastern Cape	305,837	310,450	403,061	4.9	4.7	5.6	-0.2 ▼	+0.9 ▲	6.8	8.9
Free State	238,789	239,026	235,915	8.8	8.7	8.0	-0.1 ▼	-0.7 ▼	5.2	5.2
Gauteng	1,768,041	1,913,884	1,509,800	18.8	15.6	10.0	-3.2 ▼	-5.6 ▼	41.7	33.5
KwaZulu-Natal	482,115	428,842	513,377	5.0	4.2	4.1	-0.8 ▼	-0.1 ▼	9.3	11.4
Limpopo	132,420	139,359	167,524	2.7	2.6	2.5	-0.1 ▼	-0.1 ▼	3.0	3.7
Mpumalanga	197,079	303,595	185,731	5.9	7.5	3.6	+1.6 ▲	-3.9 ▼	6.6	4.1
North West	233,935	255,385	171,887	7.8	7.3	4.5	-0.5 ▼	-2.8 ▼	5.6	3.8
Northern Cape	102,519	81,246	99,150	10.3	7.1	7.3	-3.2 ▼	+0.2 ▲	1.8	2.2
Western Cape	832,902	915,053	1,217,807	18.4	15.7	16.0	-2.7 ▼	+0.3 ▲	19.9	27.0
Total	4,293,640	4,586,838	4,504,252	9.6	8.9	7.3	-0.7 ▼	-1.6 ▼	100.0	100.0

==== Percentage of whites in the 10 most populous cities ====
White percentage per city (2011 census)
City	Percent
Pretoria	52.45%
Port Elizabeth	37.84%
Vereeniging	33.09%
Cape Town	32.31%
Bloemfontein	29.79%
East London	16.00%
Durban	15.33%
Pietermaritzburg	14.24%
Johannesburg	13.93%
Soshanguve	0.07%

=== Graphical evolution of the white population by census ===
Demographic vertical bar chart of between 1904 and 2022
Population per South African census (1790-2020)
Demographic vertical bar chart of between 1904 and 2022
Population percentage (%) per South African census (1790-2020)

=== 2022 census accuracy controversy ===
After the publication of the 2022 census results, it was reported that the undercount rate was 31%. The high undercount rate was reported as an issue of concern as it raised questions about the accuracy of the number of white, Indian, foreign-born and homeless people recorded in the census.

=== Statistics ===
==== Historical population ====
Statistics for the white population in South Africa vary greatly. Most sources show that the white population peaked in the period between 1989 and 1995 at around 5.2 to 5.6 million. Up to that point, the white population largely increased due to high birth rates and immigration. Subsequently, between the mid-1990s and the mid-2000s, the white population decreased overall. However, from 2006 to 2013, the white population increased.

Year	White population	% of total population	Source
1701	1,265	–	Cape Colony (excluding indentured servants)
1795	14,292	-	Cape Colony (excluding indentured servants)
1904	1,116,805	21.6%	1904 Census
1911	1,270,000 ▲	22.7% ▲	1911 Census
1960	3,088,492 ▲	19.3% ▼	1960 Census
1961	3,117,000 ▲	19.1% ▼	Stats SA: Mid-year population estimates, 1961
1962	3,170,000 ▲	19.0% ▼	Stats SA: Mid-year population estimates, 1962
1963	3,238,000 ▲	19.0%	Stats SA: Mid-year population estimates, 1963
1964	3,323,000 ▲	19.0%	Stats SA: Mid-year population estimates, 1964
1965	3,398,000 ▲	19.0%	Stats SA: Mid-year population estimates, 1965
1966	3,481,000 ▲	19.0%	Stats SA: Mid-year population estimates, 1966
1967	3,563,000 ▲	19.0%	Stats SA: Mid-year population estimates, 1967
1968	3,639,000 ▲	19.0%	Stats SA: Mid-year population estimates, 1968
1969	3,728,000 ▲	19.0%	Stats SA: Mid-year population estimates, 1969
1970	3,792,848 ▲	17.1% ▼	1970 Census
1971	3,920,000 ▲	17.0% ▼	Stats SA: Mid-year population estimates, 1971
1972	4,005,000 ▲	16.9% ▼	Stats SA: Mid-year population estimates, 1972
1973	4,082,000 ▲	16.8% ▼	Stats SA: Mid-year population estimates, 1973
1974	4,160,000 ▲	16.7% ▼	Stats SA: Mid-year population estimates, 1974
1975	4,256,000 ▲	16.8% ▲	Stats SA: Mid-year population estimates, 1975
1976	4,337,000 ▲	18.2% ▲	Stats SA: Mid-year population estimates, 1976
1977	4,396,000 ▲	17.9% ▼	Stats SA: Mid-year population estimates, 1977
1978	4,442,000 ▲	18.5% ▲	Stats SA: Mid-year population estimates, 1978
1979	4,485,000 ▲	18.4% ▼	Stats SA: Mid-year population estimates, 1979
1980	4,522,000 ▲	18.1% ▼	1980 Census
1981	4,603,000 ▲	18.0% ▼	Stats SA: Mid-year population estimates, 1981
1982	4,674,000 ▲	18.3% ▲	Stats SA: Mid-year population estimates, 1982
1983	4,748,000 ▲	18.2% ▼	Stats SA: Mid-year population estimates, 1983
1984	4,809,000 ▲	17.7% ▼	Stats SA: Mid-year population estimates, 1984
1985	4,867,000 ▲	17.5% ▼	1985 Census
1986	4,900,000 ▲	17.3% ▼	Stats SA: Mid-year population estimates, 1986
1991	5,068,300 ▲	13.4% ▼	1991 Census
1992	5,121,000 ▲	13.2% ▼	Stats SA: Mid-year population estimates, 1992
1993	5,156,000 ▲	13.0% ▼	Stats SA: Mid-year population estimates, 1993
1994	5,191,000 ▲	12.8% ▼	Stats SA: Mid-year population estimates, 1994
1995	5,224,000 ▲	12.7% ▼	Stats SA: Mid-year population estimates, 1995
1996	4,434,697 ▼	10.9% ▼	South African National Census of 1996
1997	4,462,200 ▲	10.8% ▼	Stats SA: Mid-year population estimates, 1997
1998	4,500,400 ▲	10.7% ▼	Stats SA: Mid-year population estimates, 1998
1999	4,538,727 ▲	10.5% ▼	Stats SA: Mid-year population estimates, 1999
2000	4,521,664 ▼	10.4% ▼	Stats SA: Mid-year population estimates, 2000
2001	4,293,640 ▼	9.6% ▼	South African National Census of 2001
2002	4,555,289 ▲	10.0% ▲	Stats SA: Mid-year population estimates, 2002
2003	4,244,346 ▼	9.1% ▼	Stats SA: Mid-year population estimates, 2003
2004	4,434,294 ▲	9.5% ▲	Stats SA: Mid-year population estimates, 2004
2005	4,379,800 ▼	9.3% ▼	Stats SA: Mid-year population estimates, 2005
2006	4,365,300 ▼	9.2% ▼	Stats SA: Mid-year population estimates, 2006
2007	4,352,100 ▼	9.1% ▼	Stats SA: Mid-year population estimates, 2007
2008	4,499,200 ▲	9.2% ▲	Stats SA: Mid-year population estimates, 2008
2009	4,472,100 ▼	9.1% ▼	Stats SA: Mid-year population estimates, 2009
2010	4,584,700 ▲	9.2% ▲	Stats SA: Mid-year population estimates, 2010
2011	4,586,838 ▲	8.9% ▼	South African National Census of 2011
2013	4,602,400 ▲	8.7% ▼	Stats SA: Mid-year population estimates, 2013
2014	4,554,800 ▼	8.4% ▼	Stats SA: Mid-year population estimates, 2014
2015	4,534,000 ▼	8.3% ▼	Stats SA: Mid-year population estimates, 2015
2016	4,515,800 ▼	8.1% ▼	Stats SA: Mid-year population estimates, 2016
2017	4,493,500 ▼	8.0% ▼	Stats SA: Mid-year population estimates, 2017
2018	4,520,100 ▲	7.8% ▼	Stats SA: Mid-year population estimates, 2018
2019	4,652,006 ▲	7.9% ▲	Stats SA: Mid-year population estimates, 2019
2020	4,679,770 ▲	7.8% ▼	Stats SA: Mid-year population estimates, 2020
2021	4,662,459 ▼	7.8%	Stats SA: Mid-year population estimates, 2021
2022	4,639,268 ▼	7.7% ▼	Stats SA: Mid-year population estimates, 2022
2023	4,504,349 ▼	7.3% ▼	South African National Census of 2022
2024	4,539,212 ▲	7.2% ▼	Stats SA: Mid-year population estimates, 2024

==== Fertility rates ====
Contraception among white South Africans is stable or slightly falling: 80% used contraception in 1990, and 79% used it in 1998.

Year	Total fertility rate	Source
1960	3.5 ▼	SARPN
1970	3.1 ▼	SARPN
1980	2.4 ▼	SARPN
1989	1.9 ▼	UN.org
1990	2.1 ▲	SARPN
1996	1.9 ▼	SARPN
1998	1.9	SARPN
2001	1.8 ▼	hst.org.za
2006	1.8	hst.org.za
2011	1.7 ▼	Census 2011

=== Life expectancy ===
The average life expectancy at birth for males and females

Year	Average life expectancy	Male life expectancy	Female life expectancy
1980	70.3	66.8	73.8
1985	71	?	?
1997	73.5	70	77
2009	71	?	?

==== Unemployment ====
Province	White unemployment rate (strict)
Eastern Cape	4.5%
Free State	
Gauteng	8.7%
KwaZulu-Natal	8.0%
Limpopo	8.0%
Mpumalanga	7.5%
North West	
Northern Cape	4.5%
Western Cape	2.0%
Total	

==== Income ====
Average annual household income by population group of the household head.

Population group	Average income (2015)	Average income (2011)	Average income (2001)
White	R 444 446 (321.7%)	R 365 134 (353.8%)	R 193 820 (400.6%)
Indian/Asian	R 271 621 (196.6%)	R 251 541 (243.7%)	R 102 606 (212.1%)
Coloured	R 172 765 (125.0%)	R 112 172 (108.7%)	R 51 440 (106.3%)
African	R 92 983 (67.3%)	R 60 613 (58.7%)	R 22 522 (46.5%)
Total	R 138 168 (100%)	R 103 204 (100%)	R 48 385 (100%)

==== Percentage of workforce ====
Province	Whites % of the workforce	Whites % of population
Eastern Cape	10%	4%
Free State		
Gauteng	25%	18%
KwaZulu-Natal	11%	6%
Limpopo	5%	2%
Mpumalanga		
North West		
Northern Cape	19%	12%
Western Cape	22%	18%
Total		

=== Languages ===
Language	2016	2011	2001	1996
Afrikaans	57.9%	60.8%	59.1%	57.7%
English	40.2%	35.9%	39.3%	38.6%
Other languages	1.9%	3.3%	1.6%	3.7%
Total	100.0%	100.0%	100.0%	100.0%

==== Religion ====
Religious affiliation of white South Africans (2001 census)
Religion	Number	Percentage (%)
– Christianity	3,726,266	86.8%
– Dutch Reformed churches	1,450,861	33.8%
– Pentecostal/Charismatic/Apostolic churches	578,092	13.5%
– Methodist Church	343,167	8.0%
– Catholic Church	282,007	6.6%
– Anglican Church	250,213	5.8%
– Other Reformed churches	143,438	3.3%
– Baptist churches	78,302	1.8%
– Presbyterian churches	74,158	1.7%
– Lutheran churches	25,972	0.6%
– Other Christian churches	500,056	11.6%
Judaism	61,673	1.4%
Islam	8,409	0.2%
Hinduism	2,561	0.1%
No religion	377,007	8.8%
Other or undetermined	117,721	2.7%
Total	4,293,637	100%

== Politics ==
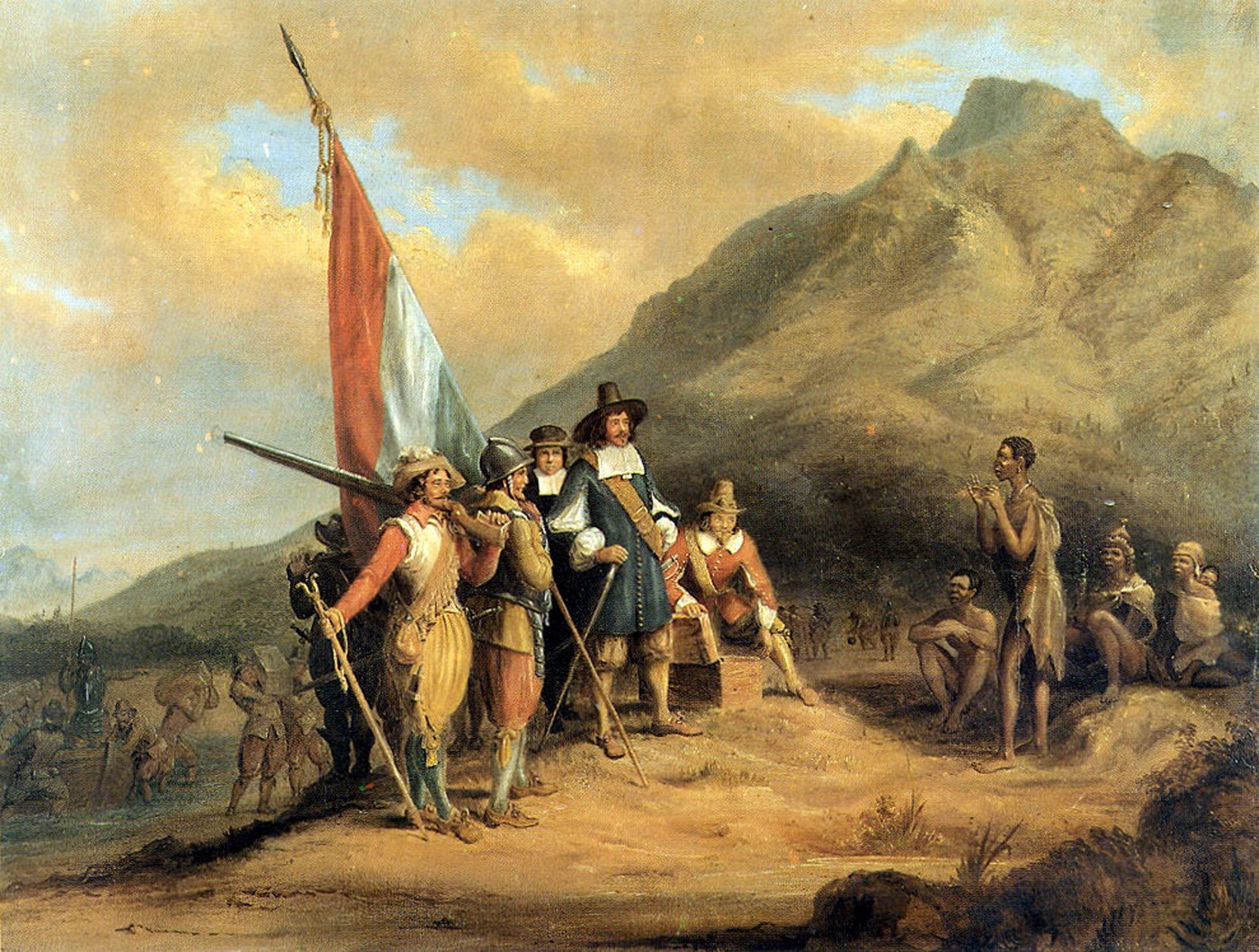
Painting of an account of the arrival of Jan van Riebeeck, founder of Cape Town

The majority of White South Africans vote for the Liberal Democratic Alliance (DA) and a smaller minority vote for the more conservative Freedom Front Plus (FF+).

Former South African President Jacob Zuma commented in 2009 on Afrikaners being "the only white tribe in a black continent or outside of Europe which is truly African", and said that "of all the white groups that are in South Africa, it is only the Afrikaners that are truly South Africans in the true sense of the word." These remarks have led to the Centre for Constitutional Rights (CCR) laying a complaint with the Human Rights Commission against Zuma. According to the CCR's spokesman, Zuma's remarks constituted "unfair discrimination against non-Afrikaans-speaking, white South Africans....."

In 2015, a complaint was investigated for hate speech against Jacob Zuma who said "You must remember that a man called Jan van Riebeeck arrived here on 6 April 1652, and that was the start of the trouble in this country."

Former South African President Thabo Mbeki stated in one of his speeches to the nation that: "South Africa belongs to everyone who lives in it. Black and White."

Prior to 1994, a white minority held complete political power under a system of racial segregation called apartheid. During apartheid era, immigrants from Taiwan, South Korea, and Japan were considered honorary whites in the country, as the government had maintained diplomatic relations with these countries. These were granted the same privileges as white people, at least for purposes of residence. Some African Americans such as Max Yergan were granted an "honorary white" status as well.

== Discrimination ==
Democratic Alliance MP Gwen Ngwenya states that racism aimed at white people in South Africa is often overlooked compared to racism aimed at black people, noting that racism aimed at white people elicits little reaction from the populace.

In 2001, former South African president Nelson Mandela criticised the growing racial intolerance of black South Africans in their attitudes toward South Africans of other racial groups.

After a black person was allegedly killed by two white people, businesses and properties owned by white people and other minorities in Coligny were targeted for destruction by members of the black community.

According to Sharlene Swartz, a research specialist of the Human Sciences Research Council (HSRC), discourses expressing violent resentment towards white populations in South Africa are widespread, citing as an example student protests during which the inscription "Fuck White People" appeared on t-shirts and walls.

== Notable White South Africans ==
=== Science and technology ===
- Christiaan Barnard, surgeon who performed first successful human heart transplant
- Johan Naude, surgeon and urologist, past president of the South African Urological Association and a pioneering transplant surgeon
- Mike Botha, diamond cutter and educator; Yves Landry Award for Outstanding Innovation in Education, Canada
- Peter Sarnak, Princeton's Eugene Higgins professor of mathematics, specialising in number theory
- Stanley Skewes, mathematician whose work in number theory produced the record breaking Skewes number
- Percy Deift, mathematician specialising in analysis
- Sydney Brenner, biologist; Nobel Prize, Physiology/Medicine 2002
- Michael Levitt, biophysicist; Nobel Prize, Chemistry 2013
- Allan McLeod Cormack, physicist; Nobel Prize, Medicine 1979
- Gordon Murray, designer of Formula One race cars, including the Championship winning McLaren MP4/4 and the ultra-exclusive McLaren F1 Roadcar
- Basil Schonland, physicist
- Neil Turok, cosmologist
- George F. R. Ellis, cosmologist
- Max Theiler, virologist; Nobel Prize, Medicine 1951
- Phillip Tobias, palaeo-anthropologist
- Seymour Papert, pioneer of artificial intelligence

=== Military ===
- Flight Lieutenant Andrew Beauchamp-Proctor VC, DSO, MC and bar, DFC fighter ace, 1st World War
- Major William Bloomfield VC, South African East African campaign, 1st World War
- Major General Dan Pienaar, VC, served in the First and Second World War
- Captain William Faulds VC MC, Delville Wood, 1st World War
- Major John Frost DFC, South African Air Force fighter ace during the Second World War
- Lieutenant Colonel Reginald Frederick Johnson Hayward VC, Western Front, 1st World War
- Captain Petrus Hugo DSO DFC, fighter ace, Second World War
- Squadron Leader Albert Gerald Lewis DFC, South African fighter ace, 2nd World War
- Adolph "Sailor" Malan, Second World War ace fighter pilot
- Squadron Leader John Dering Nettleton VC, Battle of Britain
- Major Oswald Reid VC, 1st World War
- Captain Clement Robertson VC, Western Front
- Lieutenant Colonel John Sherwood-Kelly VC CMG DSO, Second Boer War, Bambatha Rebellion, 1st World War
- Captain Quentin Smythe VC, North Africa 2nd World War
- Major Edwin Swales VC DFC, pilot during the Second World War
- Lieutenant Kevin Winterbottom HC, South African Air Force
- Staff Sergeant Danny Roxo HC, 32 Battalion, South African Army
- General Constand Viljoen SSA SD SOE SM MMM MP, former South African military chief and former leader of the Freedom Front Plus
- Air Vice Marshal John Frederick George Howe, CB, CBE, AFC (26 March 1930 – 27 January 2016)
- Lieutenant General Deon Ferreira, (1946–2002) – was a South African Army officer. He served as Chief of Joint Operations before his retirement.

=== Royalty and aristocracy ===
- Charlene, Princess of Monaco
- Bruce Murray, 12th Duke of Atholl

=== Arts and media ===
- Jani Allan, columnist and radio commentator
- Jodi Balfour, actress
- Melinda Bam, Miss South Africa 2011
- Joyce Barker, opera singer – soprano
- David Benatar, philosopher, academic and author
- Carl Beukes, actor
- David Bateson, voice actor in the Hitman video game series
- Bok van Blerk, singer
- Neill Blomkamp, director
- Lauren Brant, television personality
- Herman Charles Bosman, writer
- Johan Botha, opera singer – tenor
- Breyten Breytenbach, writer and painter
- Andre Brink, novelist
- Johnny Clegg, musician noted for performing in Juluka and Savuka
- Penelope Coelen, Miss World 1958
- Mimi Coertse, soprano – opera singer
- J. M. Coetzee, novelist; Nobel Prize, Literature 2003
- Megan Coleman, Miss South Africa 2006
- Elizabeth Connell, opera singer – mezzo-soprano, soprano
- Sharlto Copley, actor
- John Cranko, ballet dancer and choreographer
- Robyn Curnow, CNN International's anchor
- Riaan Cruywagen, South African International News anchor, TV presenter and voice artist
- Emma Corrin, actor
- Frederick Dalberg, opera singer – bass
- Embeth Davidtz, actress, South African-American, born to South African parents in Indiana
- Kurt Darren, singer
- Frances Sholto-Douglas, actress
- Theuns Jordaan, South African singer
- Izak Davel, actor, dancer, singer and model
- Belle Delphine, social media personality
- André Lötter, actor, emcee/ anchor & speaker
- Die Antwoord, band; rap-rave group formed in Cape Town
- Lisa de Nikolits, writer
- Elize du Toit, actress
- Collette Dinnigan, South African born fashion designer.
- Kelsey Egan, filmmaker and actress
- Kim Engelbrecht, actress
- Shannon Esra, actress
- Elisabeth Eybers, poet
- Duncan Faure, singer-songwriter and musician
- Nicole Flint, Miss South Africa 2008
- Athol Fugard, playwright
- Edwin Gagiano, South African-born actor, model, filmmaker, singer-songwriter based in Los Angeles.
- Margaret Gardiner, journalist and Miss Universe winner (1978)
- Dean Geyer, actor and singer
- Goldfish, electronic duo originating from Cape Town.
- Nadine Gordimer, writer; Nobel Prize, Literature 1991
- Stefans Grové, composer and writer
- Doris Gwendoline Helliwell, pianist and beauty pageant titleholder
- Cariba Heine, actress
- François Henning, singer
- Sonja Herholdt, recording artist
- Jacques Imbrailo, opera singer – baritone
- Gregory Alan Isakov, musician
- Jazzara Jaslyn, actress
- Sid James, actor, Carry On team
- Trevor Jones, composer
- Ingrid Jonker, poet
- John Joubert, composer
- Dena Kaplan, actress
- Wouter Kellerman, Flutist, 2 time Grammy winner
- Peter Klatzow, composer
- Gé Korsten, opera singer – tenor, actor
- Alice Krige, actress
- Anneline Kriel, actress and model
- Antjie Krog, writer
- Kongos; rock band
- Jordan van den Lamb, social media activist
- Caspar Lee, YouTuber, actor
- Locnville, electro hop music duo
- Lara Logan, journalist and war correspondent
- Alice Phoebe Lou, singer
- Eugène Nielen Marais, poet, writer, lawyer and naturalist
- Jessica Marais, actress
- Madeleine Masson, playwright
- Monica Mason, ballet dancer and director of the Royal Ballet
- Dalene Matthee, writer
- Dave Matthews, Grammy Award-winning singer-songwriter
- Alex McGregor, actress
- Deon Meyer, writer
- Sienna Miller, actress
- Shaun Morgan, singer and guitarist for the rock band Seether
- Genevieve Morton, model
- Marita Napier, opera singer – soprano
- Anton Nel, pianist
- Demi-Leigh Nel-Peters, Miss Universe 2017
- The Parlotones, indie rock band from Johannesburg
- Alan Paton, writer
- Debora Patta, journalist
- Graham Payn, actor, singer
- Orville Peck, musician
- Madelaine Petsch, actress, model, YouTuber
- Brendan Peyper, singer
- Tanit Phoenix, actress, fashion model
- Josh Pieters, YouTuber
- Sasha Pieterse, actress in the hit ABC family series Pretty Little Liars
- Hubert du Plessis, composer
- William Plomer, novelist, poet and literary editor
- Louis Hendrik Potgieter, member of German Eurodisco pop band Dschinghis Khan
- Sir Laurens van der Post, controversial author, conservationist, explorer, journalist and confidant to he Prince of Wales
- Behati Prinsloo, model
- Trevor Rabin, musician and composer, member of the rock band Yes
- Basil Rathbone, actor
- Melissa Reddy, journalist and author
- Zoalize Jansen van Rensburg, beauty pageant titleholder
- Mia le Roux, Miss South Africa 2024
- Angelique Rockas, actress
- J. R. Rotem, productor, songwriter and music publisher
- Jenny Runacre, actress
- Neil Sandilands, actor, director and cinematographer
- Stelio Savante, American Movie Award-winning and SAG-nominated actor
- Shortstraw, indie rock band from Johannesburg
- Olive Schreiner, South African writer, remembered for her novel The Story of an African Farm (1883).
- Leon Schuster, comedian, filmmaker, actor, presenter and singer
- Sir Antony Sher, actor
- Troye Sivan, YouTuber, singer (half Australian)
- Cliff Simon, actor and athlete
- Robin B. Smith, actor
- Phyllis Spira, ballerina, Prima Ballerina Assoluta
- Winston Sterzel, YouTuber, first China vlogger and cofounder of ADVChina
- Gerhard Steyn, singer
- Jennifer Steyn, actress
- Miriam Stockley, singer
- Rolene Strauss, Miss World 2014
- Natasha Sutherland, actress
- Tammin Sursok, actress, born in South Africa, but raised in Australia
- Jessica Sutton, actress
- Candice Swanepoel, model.
- Esta TerBlanche, actress and model
- Charlize Theron, Academy Award-winning actor
- ZP Theart, former singer for the British power metal band DragonForce, former singer for the American rock band Skid Row and singer for the British heavy metal band I Am I
- J.R.R. Tolkien, writer and philologist
- Elize du Toit, actress
- Jakob Daniël du Toit, poet
- Pieter-Dirk Uys, performer and satirist, creator of Evita Bezuidenhout
- Musetta Vander, actress
- Kevin Volans, composer and pianist
- Arnold Vosloo, actor
- Casper de Vries, comedian
- Justine Waddell, actress
- Deon van der Walt, opera singer – tenor
- Hannah van der Westhuysen, actress
- Steven John Ward, actor
- Kyle Watson, record producer and DJ.
- Jane de Wet, actress
- Amira Willighagen, soprano and philanthropist
- Dave Wittenberg, voice actor
- Arnold van Wyk, composer
- N. P. van Wyk Louw, poet
- Jean-Philip Grobler, South African-born musician and singer from a New York-based Indietronica band St. Lucia (musician).

=== Business ===
- Etienne de Villiers, investor; media and sports executive
- Ivan Glasenberg, CEO of Glencore Xstrata, one of the world's largest commodity trading and mining companies
- Elon Musk, entrepreneur: SpaceX, Tesla Motors, and PayPal; wealthiest person in the world as of July 2025
- Sol Kerzner, accountant and business magnate mainly in the casino resort sector
- Harry Oppenheimer, chairman of Anglo American Corporation for 25 years and De Beers Consolidated Mines for 27 years
- Nicky Oppenheimer, chairman of the De Beers diamond mining company and its subsidiary, the Diamond Trading Company
- Anton Rupert, founder of the Rembrandt Group
- Johann Rupert, chairman of the Swiss-based luxury-goods company Richemont and South Africa-based company Remgro
- Desmond Sacco, chairman and managing director of Assore Limited
- Mark Shuttleworth, founder of Ubuntu, a Linux based computer Operating system; first African in space
- Christo Wiese, consumer Retail business magnate
- Clive Calder, record executive and businessman who co-founded the Zomba Group of Companies

=== Politics ===
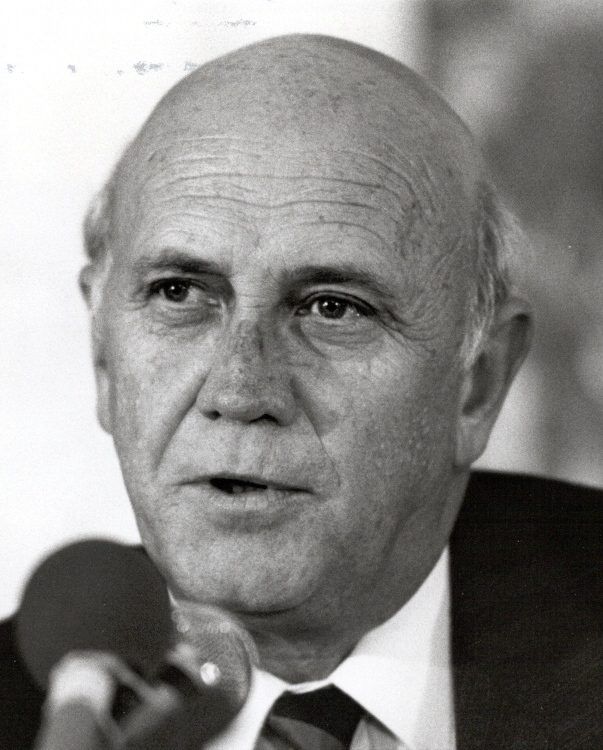
F. W. de Klerk, South Africa's last white president (1989-1994)

- Louis Botha, farmer, soldier, statesman; first Prime Minister of South Africa
- P. W. Botha, former State President of South Africa
- F. W. de Klerk, former State President of South Africa
- Marike de Klerk, former First Lady of South Africa, murdered in her home in 2001
- Sir Patrick Duncan Governor-General at the start of the Second World War
- Ruth First, anti-apartheid activist and scholar
- Sir James Percy FitzPatrick, author, politician and businessman
- Derek Hanekom, Deputy Minister of Technology; prominent ANC member of Parliament
- Nicholas Haysom, Former legal adviser to Nelson Mandela, former United Nations Special Representative to Afghanistan
- Geordin Hill-Lewis, Mayor of Cape Town
- Sandra Laing, white girl reclassified as "Coloured" during the apartheid era
- D. F. Malan, former Prime Minister of South Africa
- Pieter Mulder, former Deputy Minister of Agriculture, Forestry, Fisheries; leader of the Freedom Front Plus
- Andries Pretorius, former leader of the Voortrekkers who was instrumental in the creation of the South African Republic
- Harry Schwarz, lawyer, politician, diplomat and anti-apartheid leader
- Joe Slovo, former leader of the South African Communist Party played key part in constitutional negotiations in the 1990s
- Field Marshal Jan Smuts, soldier, politician and former Prime Minister of South Africa during both World Wars. Only person to sign both world war peace treaties on the winning side.
- Jan Steytler, first leader of Progressive Party of South Africa, former MP
- Helen Suzman, anti-apartheid activist and former MP, solo anti-apartheid parliamentarian from 1961 to 1974 representing Progressive Party (South Africa), served on first Independent Electoral Commission supervising first non-racial national elections in South Africa
- Colin Eglin, former leader of the Progressive Party (South Africa) and its successors and former MP, played key role in building up parliamentary opposition to apartheid in the 1970s and 1980s, and in constitutional negotiations in the 1990s
- Zach de Beer, former Progressive Party (South Africa) MP, subsequent leader of Democratic Party and post-apartheid ambassador to The Netherlands, also played key part in constitutional negotiations in the 1990s
- Rick Crouch, City Councillor in the eThekwini Metropolitan Municipality
- Eugène Terre'Blanche, former leader of the Afrikaner Weerstandsbeweging; murdered
- Andries Treurnicht, former Leader of the Opposition (South Africa) from 1987 to 1993
- Marthinus van Schalkwyk, previous Minister of Tourism and ANC member of Parliament; played a key role in merging the National Party into the ANC
- Hendrik Verwoerd, former Prime Minister of South Africa; primary architect of Apartheid; assassinated in Cape Town, in the House of Assembly
- Helen Zille, former leader of the Democratic Alliance and Premier of the Western Cape

=== Sport ===
- Angélico, professional wrestler
- Johan Ackermann, South African coach
- Willem Alberts, professional rugby player
- Gary Anderson, american football player
- Kevin Anderson, professional tennis player
- Jethren Barr, professional footballer
- Clive Barker, former footballer and football coach, led the South Africa national football team to victory in the 1996 African Cup of Nations
- Roxanne Barker, footballer
- Mike Bernardo, kickboxer
- Robin Bell, slalom canoeist
- Matthew Booth, former footballer
- Francois Botha, professional boxer
- Michael Botha, professional rugby player
- Anneke Bosch, cricketeer
- Mark Boucher, former professional cricketer
- Vincent Breet, rower
- Okkert Brits, former pole vaulter, holds the African record and only African in the "6 metres club"
- Schalk Brits, professional rugby player
- Zola Budd, former track and field runner, broke the world record in the women's 5000 m twice in under three years
- Nicole Burger, skeleton racer
- Schalk Burger, former professional rugby player
- Ashleigh Buhai, golfer
- JP Buys, mixed martial artist
- Jan-Henning Campher, rugby player
- Bradley Carnell, former footballer
- Ethan Chislett, footballer
- Gerrie Coetzee, former boxer, first boxer from Africa to win a world heavyweight title
- Pieter Coetze, South African professional swimmer
- Amanda Coetzer, former tennis player
- Kaylene Corbett, South African professional swimmer
- Tony Coyle, former footballer
- Hansie Cronje, professional cricketer
- Bradley Cross, footballer
- Lood de Jager, professional rugby player
- Faf de Klerk, professional rugby player
- Quinton de Kock, professional cricketer
- Steyn de Lange, freestyle wrestler
- Roger De Sá, former footballer
- Lance Davids, former footballer
- AB de Villiers, former cricketer
- Giniel de Villiers, racing driver and winner of the 2009 Dakar Rally
- Jean de Villiers, former professional rugby player
- Allan Donald, professional cricketer
- Dricus du Plessis, mixed martial artist
- Faf du Plessis, professional cricketer
- Jo-Ané du Plessis, track and field athlete
- Natalie du Toit, paralympian swimmer
- Pieter-Steph du Toit, professional rugby player
- Thomas du Toit, professional rugby player
- Ernie Els, professional golfer, former World No. 1 and winner of four Majors
- Justin Erasmus, baseball player
- Rassie Erasmus, South African coach
- André Esterhuizen, South African rugby player
- Eben Etzebeth, professional rugby player
- Brett Evans, former footballer and current football coach
- Paul Evans, former footballer
- Rowen Fernández, former footballer
- Lyndon Ferns, former swimmer and gold medallist in the 4 × 100 m freestyle relay at the 2004 Summer Olympics
- Wayne Ferreira, former tennis player
- Mark Fish, former footballer
- Dean Furman, footballer, captain of South African team
- Gordon Gilbert, footballer
- Christie Grobbelaar, rugby player
- Retief Goosen, professional golfer, twice US Open champion
- Micke Günter, professional rugby player
- Cameron Hanekom, South African rugby player
- Penny Heyns, former swimmer, the only woman in the history of the Olympic Games to have won both the 100 m and 200 m breaststroke events, at the 1996 Summer Olympics
- Alan Hatherly, mountain bike racer
- Darren Holden, footballer
- Tanna Hollis, footballer
- Liezel Huber, tennis player
- Pierre Issa, former footballer
- Catha Jacobs, professional rugby player
- Liam Jordan, footballer
- Tiffany Keep, cyclist
- Steven Kitshoff, professional rugby player
- Heinrich Klassen, South African cricketer
- Jean Kleyn, South African rugby player
- Vincent Koch, professional rugby player
- George Koumantarakis, former footballer
- Johan Kriek, former professional tennis player and winner of the 1981 Australian Open
- Jesse Kriel, professional rugby player
- Jayde Kruger, race driver
- Patrick Lambie, former professional rugby player
- Grant Langston, former professional motocross rider who competed in Europe and the US
- Chad le Clos, swimmer and gold medalist in the 200m butterfly at the 2012 Summer Olympics in London
- Bernard Le Roux, professional rugby player
- Willie le Roux, South African professional rugby player
- Adam Rose, professional wrestler, formerly signed with World Wrestling Entertainment
- Paul Lloyd Jr., professional wrestler, formerly signed with World Wrestling Entertainment where he performed under the name Justin Gabriel
- Francois Louw, professional rugby player
- Kylie Louw, former footballer
- Danelle Lochner, professional rugby player
- Reinhardt Ludwig, South African rugby player
- Isabella Ludwig, footballer
- Stephanie Malherbe, footballer
- Calvin Marlin, former footballer
- Malcolm Marx, professional rugby player
- Victor Matfield, former professional rugby player
- Hank McGregor, surf skier and kayak marathon champion
- Elana Meyer, former long-distance runner, set 15 km road running and half marathon African records
- Percy Montgomery, former rugby union player and current record holder for both caps and points for the Springboks
- Charan Moore, is a South African motorcycle racer
- Albie Morkel, cricketer
- Morne Morkel, cricketer
- Franco Mostert, professional rugby player
- Karen Muir, former swimmer
- Lauren Mukheibir, rock climber
- Franco Naudé, professional rugby player
- Steve Nash, basketball player
- Ryk Neethling, former swimmer and gold medallist in the 4 × 100 m freestyle relay at the 2004 Summer Olympics
- Jacques Nienaber, South African coach
- Victor Nogueira, footballer
- Jan Nortje, kickboxer
- Ricardo Nunes, footballer
- Dallas Oberholzer, skateboarder
- Louis Oosthuizen, professional golfer, winner of 2010 Open Championship
- Ryan Oosthuizen, rugby player
- Andrew Parkinson, footballer
- Keri-anne Payne, swimmer
- Dane Haylett-Petty, rugby player
- Tasmin Pepper, race driver
- Jordan Pepper, race driver
- Anthony Phillips, baseball player
- François Pienaar, former captain of the Springboks, leading South Africa to victory in the 1995 Rugby World Cup
- Kevin Pietersen, former England international cricketer
- Oscar Pistorius, former paralympic athlete; convicted of the murder of his girlfriend
- Handré Pollard, professional rugby player
- Dante Polvara, footballer
- Jacques Potgieter, former professional rugby player
- Gary Player, former professional golfer, winner of 9 major titles and widely regarded as one of the greatest players in the history of golf
- Pieter Prinsloo, basketball player
- André Pretorius, former rugby player
- Trevor Prangley, mixed martial artist
- Mari Rabie, triathlete.
- Cobus Reinach, professional rugby player
- Jonty Rhodes, professional cricketer
- Nadine Roos, professional rugby player
- Jarred Rothwell, muay thai boxer
- Tamara Reeves, former cricketer
- Cameron Saaiman, mixed martial artists
- Gabriela Salgado, footballer
- Glen Salmon, former footballer
- Corrie Sanders, in 2003 became the WBO heavyweight champion; murdered in 2012
- Jody Scheckter, former Formula One auto-racer and winner of 1979 Formula One season
- Samantha Schoeffel, tennis player
- Louis Schreuder, professional rugby player
- Roland Schoeman, swimmer and gold medallist in the 4 × 100 m freestyle relay at the 2004 Summer Olympics
- Charl Schwartzel, professional golfer and winner of the 2011 Masters Tournament
- Johanita Scholtz, badminton player
- Dillon Sheppard, former footballer
- Jan Serfontein, professional rugby player
- Matthew Smith, cross country skier
- John Smit, former captain of the Springboks, leading South Africa to victory in the 2007 Rugby World Cup
- Graeme Smith, former captain of the Proteas
- Kwagga Smith, professional rugby player
- Tatjana Smith, swimmer and gold medalist in the 200m breaststroke at the 2020 Summer Olympics and 100m breaststroke at the 2024 Summer Olympics
- Fletcher Smythe-Lowe, footballer
- RG Snyman, professional rugby player
- Dale Steyn, cricket pace bowler
- Sage Stephens, footballer
- Kyle Stolk, swimmer
- Andrew Surman, South African footballer
- Carla Swart, collegiate cyclist, won nineteen individual and team cycling titles
- Eric Tinkler, former footballer
- Mark Anderson, former goalkeeper of the South Africa national football team
- Neil Tovey, former captain of the South Africa national football team, leading the team to victory in the 1996 African Cup of Nations
- Darian Townsend, swimmer and gold medallist in the 4 × 100 m freestyle relay at the 2004 Summer Olympics
- Andrew Tucker, former footballer
- Hans Vonk, former footballer, South Africa's first choice goalkeeper during 1998 Fifa World Cup
- Chloe Tryon, cricketer
- Beth Tweddle, gymnest
- Dylan Unsworth, baseball player
- Brandon Valjalo, skateboarder
- Cameron van der Burgh, swimmer who represented South Africa at the 2008 Summer Olympics and at the 2012 Summer Olympics winning gold at the 100-metre breaststroke in a new world record
- Rassie van der Dussen, professional cricketer
- Lara van Niekerk, South African swimmer
- Marco van Staden, South African rugby player
- Janine van Wyk, footballer and captain of South Africa women's national football team
- Hans Vonk, former footballer
- Lars Veldwijk, footballer
- Duane Vermeulen, professional rugby player
- Dino Visser, footballer
- Julia Vincent, diver
- Gerhard Vosloo, professional rugby player
- Jessica Wade, footballer
- Eloise Webb, professional rugby player
- Laura Wolvaardt, cricketer
- Douglas Whyte, horse racing jockey, 13-time Hong Kong champion jockey
- Cobus Wiese, South African rugby player
- Jasper Wiese, South African rugby player
- Jan-Hendrik Wessels, South African rugby player
- Ivan Winstanley, former footballer
- Neil Winstanley, former footballer
- Brad Binder, South African motorcycle racer, competing in MotoGP with the Red Bull KTM Team, winner of the 2016 Moto3 world championship

=== Other ===
- Mariette Bosch, murderer executed by the government of Botswana in 2001 for the murder of South African Ria Wolmarans
- Micki Pistorius, forensic and investigative psychologist and author
- Brian Steven Smith, murderer and suspected serial killer arrested in Alaska in 2019

== See also ==
- White Africans of European ancestry
- Bantu peoples of South Africa
- Coloureds
- Cape Malay
- Afrikaners
- History of South Africa
- Portuguese South Africans
- Greek South Africans
- Huguenots in South Africa
- 1820 settlers
- Italian South Africans
- Irish diaspora
- Khoisan
- Asian South Africans
- Indian South Africans
- Japanese South Africans
- Chinese South Africans
- Serbs in South Africa
- Norwegian South Africans
- German South Africans
- History of the Jews in South Africa
- Racism in South Africa
- Demographics of South Africa
- White demographic decline
- White genocide in South Africa
- South African farm attacks
