= Winstanley =

Winstanley may refer to:

== People ==
- Alan Winstanley, British record producer
- Bill Winstanley, English footballer who played for Stoke City
- Dean Winstanley, English darts player
- Eric Winstanley, English footballer
- Gerrard Winstanley, 17th-century English religious reformer
- Henry Winstanley, 17th-century English engineer
- Ivan Winstanley, South African football player
- Michael Winstanley, Baron Winstanley, late 20th-century English politician and Member of Parliament
- Neil Winstanley, South African football player
- Paul Winstanley, British painter
- Russ Winstanley, British disc jockey
- William Winstanley (c. 1628 – 1698), English poet and compiler of biographies.

== Other uses ==
- Winstanley, Greater Manchester, England, UK, a suburb
  - Winstanley (ward), an electoral ward of the Wigan Metropolitan Borough Council
- Winstanley College, Sixth Form College
- Winstanley (film), 1975 film about Gerrard Winstanley

== See also ==
- Billinge and Winstanley Urban District, urban district containing the suburb of Winstanley
