= Edwin Gagiano =

South African Actor, filmmaker, singer/songwriter (born 1989)

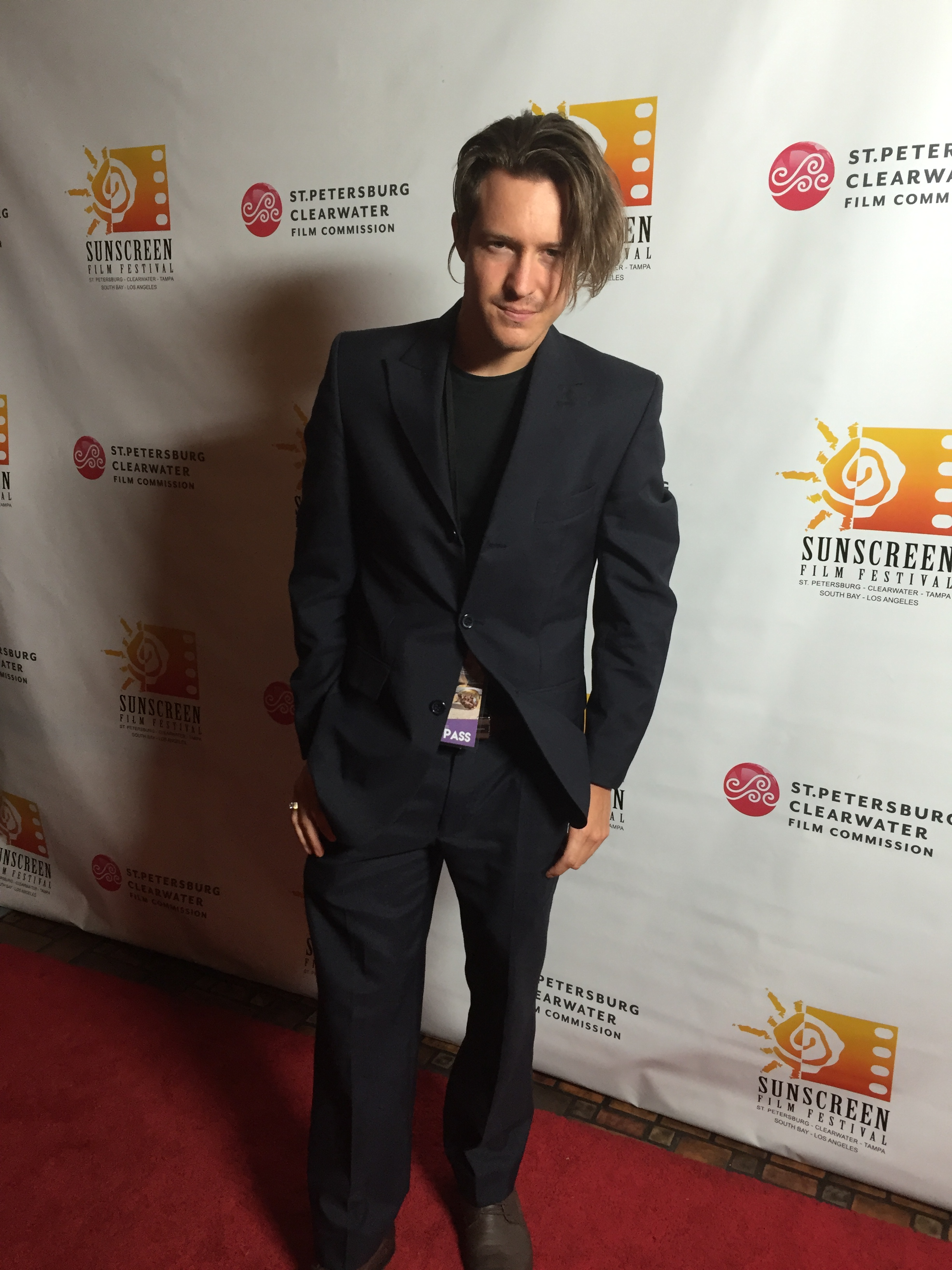
- In 2016, Gagiano on the red carpet at Sunscreen Film Festival, St. Petersburg, FL
- Born: Edwin Gagiano; 1 June 1989 (age 37); Kimberley, South Africa
- Education: HTS Kimberley
- Occupations: Actor, filmmaker, singer/songwriter
- Years active: 2006–present

Edwin Gagiano (born 1 June 1989) is a South African-born actor, screenwriter, producer, singer/songwriter and model based in Los Angeles, California. He is regarded as one of South Africa’s highest-earning actors by The New Age and has won several awards for his achievements, including Best Actor Award for his role as Alf Bueller in the show Back to the 80s.

== Early life ==
Gagiano was born in Kimberley, Northern Cape, and relocated to Los Angeles in 2015. His father, Albertus Johannes, is a math lecturer and a war veteran who served his country during the South African Border War in the 1980s. His mother, Maryna Elizabeth, is a retired banker and interior designer. Gagiano is of Italian, British and Welsh ancestry. Gagiano attended Technical High School (HTS Kimberley) and began his career at sixteen as a stage actor when he landed one of the leading roles as Alf Bueller in the Northern Cape Theatre musical Back to the 80s. In 2014, he was cast by the Peoples Theatre as Disney’s Prince Charming in Cinderella.

== Career ==
=== Acting ===
Gagiano debuted on the television as the lead in SABC 2’s primetime television series Snake Park (2014), portraying Zak Verwey. The show was picked up for a second season in 2015 due to its high viewership, exceeding 2 million viewers per episode. Gagiano went on to star and co-star in nine feature films and three television series. He was included in the closing cast of the soap opera Villa Rosa in 2015, starring as Marcel Geldenhuys. Gagiano starred in several other feature films, including Seun: 81457397BG (2014), and Last Broken Darkness (2016). He had a bit part in the movie Chappie (2015).

=== Commercials ===
In 2015, Gagiano was cast as the lead in South Africa’s national Toyota ad campaign to advertise the new Toyota Aygo. This campaign covered television, cinema, public locations and internet usage, with more than 200,000 views on YouTube.

=== Singing and songwriting ===
In 2010, Gagiano released an EP album with 6 songs. His single "Mommy" was repeatedly played on PUK FM 93.6, and "3 Reasons Why" played on Highveld Stereo. Gagiano wrote the Afrikaans single "Stille Praatwerk", which he performed on the kykNET hit television series Sterlopers, as Andre Groenewald.

== Filmography ==
=== Film roles ===
Selected film credits
Year	Title	Role	Director	Notes
2017	Corporate Red	Corporate Black	Timothy Klein	
2016	Last Broken Darkness	Fowler	Christopher-Lee Dos Santos	
2015	Chappie	Office Worker	Neill Blomkamp	
2014	Seun: 81457397BG	Marius	Darrell Roodt	
2014	Run or Die	Deputy John Jr.	Eugene Koekemoer	
2016	Thirst	Ryan Temple	Kevin Singh	
2016	Gisteraand	Liam	Francois Olivier	Short film
2016	Beeldskoon	Armand Valentine	Edwin Gagiano	Also writer
2016	Strong	Aldus	Edwin Gagiano	Also writer, producer

=== Television roles ===
Selected television credits
Year	Title	Role	Director	Notes
2013	Snake Park	Zak Verwey	Darrell Roodt	Season 1, 13 episode
2015	Snake Park	Zak Verwey	Deon Potgieter	Season 2, 13 episodes
2016	Villa Rosa	Marcel Geldenhuys	Andries Van Der Merwe	9 episodes
2016	Sterlopers	Andre Groenewald	Luhann Jansen	2 episodes

=== Theatre roles ===
Selected theatre credits
Year	Title	Role	Company
2014	Cinderella	Prince Charming	Disney
2013	Back to the 80s	Alf Bueller	Northern Cape Theatre

=== Commercials ===
Selected commercial roles
Year	Title	Role	Usage
2015	Toyota Aygo	Lead	Television, cinema, public location, internet
2014	Snickers	Player 5	Russia, Soccer World Cup

== Awards, honors and achievements ==
- Best Actor Award – Gagiano received the Best Actor Award for his role as Alf Bueller in Back to the 80’s.
- Honors in Drama and Arts – In 2007, Gagiano was awarded the Blazer of Honor in Drama and Arts by HTS Kimberley.
- Top Male Actor in Villa Rosa Star Hunt competition – Gagiano was the only male actor to advance to the Top 10 of this nationwide competition out of thousands of actors. Villa Rosa Star Hunt was televised on KykNET television.

== Influences ==
Gagiano's acting influences are Jack Nicholson, Kevin Spacey, Leonardo DiCaprio, Al Pacino and Matt Damon. His biggest director influence is Steven Spielberg.
