= HTS Kimberley =

Kimberley Technical High School
- Tegniese hoërskool Kimberley

Location
- Kimberley, Northern Cape; South Africa; 28.754094°S 24.748250°E

Information
- School type: Public
- Motto: Dexteritas Cum Culturia (Latin) Translated it means: Efficient and with Culture
- Established: 1976
- Principal: Micheal Ludick
- Grades: 8-12
- Gender: Co-Ed
- Colors: Blue and White
- Feeder schools: Eureka Primary School, Newton Primary School
- Alumni: Edwin Gagiano

HTS Kimberley is a Technical High School in Kimberley, South Africa. It is the Afrikaans for Hoër Tegniese Skool Kimberley. The English name is THS Kimberley. That stands for Technical High School Kimberley

== Established ==
From 1943 to 1975 a college by the name Technical College Northern Cape existed. In 1976 the College was divided into 2 independent High Schools, namely Technical High School Kimberley and Northern Cape Trade High School.

== Motto ==
Dexteritas cum Culturia (Latin) Translated it means: Efficient and with Culture.

== Gender and language ==
It is a co-ed school, which teaches in Afrikaans and English.

== Alumni ==
- Edwin Gagiano - South African born actor and model, now living in the United States of America.
