= Norwegian South Africans =

Norwegian South Africans Norske sørafrikanere Noors Suid-Afrikaners

Total population
- 1,297 (2005)

Regions with significant populations
- KwaZulu-Natal, Gauteng and Western Cape

Languages
- Afrikaans, English, Norwegian

Religion
- Christianity (Lutheranism)

Related ethnic groups
- Norwegians, Norwegian diaspora

Norwegian South Africans are South African citizens of Norwegian ancestry. While most Norwegian emigrants moved to America, some people also moved to South Africa, Madagascar, Angola, and Mozambique. The number of Norwegians in the whole of Africa in 1920 was 998. The number rose to 1,107 by 1930; 651 Norwegians lived in South Africa and 147 in Madagascar. Official migration numbers from 1961 to 2005 are available.

== History ==
In 1869, Arnt Leonard Thesen sailed to South Africa along with his large family in their schooner, the Albatros, after his ship-owning and timber company in Stavanger collapsed the previous year as a result of the Second Schleswig War of 1864-67. Even though they originally intended to go to New Zealand, once they encountered stormy weather east of Cape Town after spending a week in Cape Town for repairs and to load provisions, they returned to Cape Town for further repairs. Once there, they encountered the Swedish-Norwegian consul, Carl Gustaf Åkerberg, who notified them about transport shipping shortages along the South African coast and how they could take advantage of that situation; the plan to sail on to New Zealand was first delayed and then scrapped altogether. Ultimately, the Thesen family settled in Knysna, with its fjord-like port; their family firm first worked in timber shipping and then expanded to sawmills and acquiring forested land. Following Arnt Leonard's death in 1875, ownership of the company was passed to one of his sons, Charles Wilhelm Thesen, and it expanded into additional ships and into other areas, such as oyster farming, whaling, hardware stores, and gold mining. Charles Wilhelm became more politically involved in Knysna, becoming its mayor in 1890-93 and again in 1921-24. The Thesen Company is still a major enterprise in South Africa to this day.

In the 1890s, roughly 90 families, most from Sunnmøre, immigrated to South Africa and Kwazulu-Natal. After arrival at Port Shepstone, the families were each awarded a lot (soil patch, parcel) and could begin to build a house and cultivate the soil. In 1882 a party of 246 Norwegian immigrants settled in nearby Marburg near Port Shepstone and played a large part in the development of the area. Although a few went back home and others went to Australia, most Norwegians remained in the area. After a short time they began to build a church, the Norwegian Settler's Church, which is still in operation after being expanded twice. The church is also a Norwegian museum exhibiting things Norwegians brought with them from home, such as bunad, tools, and kitchen utensils. Norwegians also put their mark on place names in the area, like Oslo Beach and Fredheim.

Later Norwegians participated in gold-digging in Johannesburg, and the Norwegian missionaries were among the first who established Christianity in Zululand.

Early in the 1900s had the Norwegians already established a Norwegian school, Norwegian Lutheran Church and Norwegian newspapers in Durban. In line with the expanding whaling and the growing Norwegian merchant fleet, the presence of Norwegians South Africa peaked towards the middle of the 1900s, with their center being Durban. Durban's major Norwegian ancestors were Abraham Larsen and Jacob Egeland.

The presence of Norwegian culture has declined since its peak, but some cultural traditions remain, such as potetløp being held for costume-clad children. There are still gathering places such as The Norwegian Hall, the former Norwegian Lutheran Church, St. Olav's Church.

== See also ==
- Norwegian diaspora
- Immigration to South Africa
- White South Africans
