= Ivan Winstanley =

South African soccer player

Ivan Rodney Winstanley (born 25 August 1976 in Johannesburg, Gauteng) is a South African former soccer player who played as a defender. He last played for National First Division club Thanda Royal Zulu. His twin brother is Neil Winstanley.

- Year joined Thanda: 2009
- Previous clubs: Moroka Swallows, Maritzburg United, Wits University, Kaizer Chiefs
