= Back to the 80s (musical) =

Back To The 80's
- ... The Totally Awesome Musical!
- Music: Various Artists - Originally adapted by Scott Copeman. Revised orchestrations and arrangements by Brett Foster.
- Lyrics: Neil Gooding
- Book: Neil Gooding. Additional material by Stuart Smith
- Productions: 2001 Sydney

Back to the 80's is a 1980s nostalgia musical written by Neil Gooding with the original musical adaption made by Scott Copeman. It was later re-orchestrated and arranged by Brett Foster in 1999, just prior to the Australian Production. It was originally staged by Neil Gooding Productions Pty. Ltd. in Sydney, Australia in 2001. It is a popular show for school productions in the English speaking world.

The musical is a jukebox musical featuring pop songs from the 1980s, as well as a rap song written by Neil Gooding.

== Plot ==
=== Act I ===
It is the early 2000s and the main character Corey Snr. is telling the story of his Senior Year at William Ocean High School.

After the assembly, Corey seeks out Tiffany Houston, his lifelong neighbor whom he has been in love with since they were children. Tiffany is nice and friendly towards Corey, but is oblivious to his feelings for her. Instead, Tiffany admits to Corey that she likes Michael. Cyndi enters and introduces her friends Melanie and Kimberly Easton, or Mel & Kim as they prefer to be called. They are twins who are Cyndi's friends from dance class. They immediately fit in with the popular kids, unlike Corey, who slinks away dejected. Cyndi introduces Mel and Kim to the popular boys, and plans to set the two of them up with Huey and Lionel. The popular kids, led by Tiffany, talk about their summer vacation, the girls talking about how they got home late from many parties, irritating their parents ("Girls Just Wanna Have Fun") while the guys, led by Michael, talk about how they spent all summer working, Michael saving up to buy a car ("Footloose").

After school, Corey, Alf and Kirk begin work on an election campaign. Tiffany tells Corey that her team is having trouble with getting Michael to actually focus on creating a campaign. As they are working, Feargal enters, dictating that in the 1990s, technology will advance. He is thoroughly mocked. Corey then reveals his election plan to Alf and Kirk - a concert, similar to that of the Live Aid concerts, to help fund the school prom. However, after a small scuffle, Michael Feldman and Billy Arnold, together with Lionel Astley and Huey Jackson, end up stealing Corey's concert idea without his knowledge.

On election day, Michael recruits the cheerleaders to help make his presentation extra flashy ("Mickey"). He takes the stand and pitches the concert idea to the student body. Everyone reacts positively to the idea ("Michael's Election Rap"). Corey is next up to pitch his campaign, but with his only idea stolen, he bombs his presentation. Feargal, Laura and Debbie are next up, and Feargal's pitch includes the advance of technology, informing the students (to their horror) that CDs will replace cassette tapes ("Video Killed the Radio Star"). The election commences and Michael wins by a landslide.

Corey Snr. takes the stage again to tell the audience about how, after election day, he started having nightmares. Corey Jnr., Kirk and Alf are all hanging out at Corey's place, and strike up conversation about Feargal's presentation. They all agree that the things they love from the 1980s, like Star Wars and the Atari, will be around forever. Kirk and Alf leave when Corey starts getting ready for bed. He falls asleep, and dreams of a world in which he is a Luke Skywalker character, and Tiffany is his Princess Leia. They dance together, madly in love, before Darth Vader enters, stealing Tiffany away. Darth Vader reveals himself as Michael. Corey wakes in a cold sweat ("Glory of love")

Halfway through the school year, a new girl by the name of Eileen Reagan comes to the school. She is taunted by Cyndi for liking the band Air Supply, but is fast friends with Laura and Debbie, who lie about their multiple boyfriends, telling Eileen that they are on "business" in Miami ("Let's Hear It For The Boy").

After class, Mr. Cocker surprises Ms. Brannigan with flowers for their one-year anniversary. Mr. Cocker wants to be more open about their relationship, but Ms. Brannigan wants to stay professional at school. Just as they are about to kiss, Laura and Debbie run in, alerting Mr. Cocker that Feargal is being beat up by two junior girls. Before leaving to go help, Mr. Cocker sets a date with Ms. Brannigan.

At lunch, Corey is preparing himself to ask Tiffany out. Unbeknownst to him, Michael is preparing to do the same. They compete for her affection ("I'm Gonna Be (500 Miles)"). Tiffany chooses Michael, telling Corey that she sees him as a brother. Corey Snr. enters the stage, reminiscing on how hurt he was ("You Give Love A Bad Name").

After lunch, Michael, Huey, Lionel and Billy slip a fake love letter into Eileen's locker. In another part of the school, Mr. Cocker has confiscated a dirty magazine from Huey. Huey tells his friends that he found the magazine in his dad's cupboard, and it is from the 1970s. They laugh together, and Huey jokes that Mr. Cocker is probably in his office "having a perve". While looking through the magazine, Mr. Cocker recognizes one of the models as Ms. Brannigan. He confronts her about it, and she admits that she did pose for the magazine when she was 18. Mr. Cocker is angry that she never told him, and refuses to see her ("You Give Love A Bad Name (Reprise)").

Michael has forgotten about the concert idea that helped get him elected, and so Corey steps up, asking Mr. Cocker if he can put on the concert. Mr. Cocker agrees, and calls an assembly where he announces the concert will commence, under Corey's direction. At first, the students are unenthused, but with some urging from the faculty, they eventually come around ("Man In The Mirror").

=== Act II ===
The concert is a huge success, with the cast lined up in full 1980s garb to sing to their parents ("We are the World"). Corey's parents are away in Indianapolis, so he throws a huge party at his house ("Dancing on the ceiling"). It is there that Mr. Cocker officially ends things with Ms. Brannigan. The whole party is ruined when Corey's parents come home early, and Corey is grounded.

After the student body scatters from the scene, Corey begins cleaning up. Outside his house, he accidentally interrupts Michael and Tiffany kissing. Ms. Brannigan returns to fetch her sweater. She and Corey share a moment of shared disappointment at having lost their loves ("Total Eclipse Of The Heart").

Back at school, Michael, Huey, Billy and Lionel continue sending Eileen fake love letters. Feargal has taken up Karate from the unseen groundskeeper, Mr. Miyagi. Prom is fast approaching, and everyone is anxious to find a date. Eileen finds another letter in her locker, this one actually signed by Michael, which states that he is in love with her. The girls, overjoyed, celebrate ("Walking On Sunshine"). The boys continue placing letters in her locker.

Tiffany, Cyndi, Mel and Kim are gossiping about the boys. They are all getting cars, but Kim tells the girls that Michael's car is nothing to be seen. Michael shows up in his new car, along with Huey, Billy and Lionel. Corey tries to compete with Michael's new car with his two-seater bike, but to no avail ("Get Outta My Dreams (Get Into My Car)").

Before class, Ms. Brannigan attempts to talk to Mr. Cocker because she misses him, but Mr. Cocker cannot get over the magazine incident. He goes to teach his class but becomes distracted by the memory of the picture, and in his head, the class starts to taunt him ("Centerfold").

After school, Eileen reads from one of Michael's letters what Michael is really saying to Tiffany ("Lost In Your Eyes"). Billy has recruited some girls to help him ask Cyndi to the prom ("Never Gonna Give You Up"), but Cyndi coldly rejects him, telling the story to her friends later on ("Material Girl").

As Michael and his gang are putting another letter into Eileen's locker, Eileen, Laura and Debbie stumble upon them. The girls mistakenly believe that Michael has come to ask Eileen to prom, but Michael and Huey tell them the truth in the most cruel way possible. Laura and Debbie take a sobbing Eileen away. Tiffany, having seen the whole thing, angrily breaks up with Michael in front of the whole school. Michael and his gang tries to leave the scene, but Feargal stops them, demanding they go apologize to Eileen immediately. They refuse, and Michael engages Feargal in a fight, causing Feargal to get a bloody nose. Then, Mr. Miyagi, in Feargal's head, guides him through what to do, and he beats Michael to the ground in front of Huey, Billy and Lionel.

In the schoolyard, Eileen is sobbing by herself. Corey enters and starts trying to comfort her. She confesses that she feels that she does not fit in. She thought that she had found her place, but now she knows that everyone has been laughing at her behind the back. Corey calls over Alf and Kirk, and together the three of them assure Eileen that she is well-liked, and that Michael and his gang are the only jerks ("Come On Eileen/Don't Worry, Be Happy"). Kirk and Alf reveal that Feargal defended Eileen from Michael, and Eileen happily runs off to thank him, followed by Alf and Kirk. Tiffany enters, praising Corey for being supportive of Eileen. She confesses that she wants to go to prom with him, but thinks he's going with Eileen. Corey tells her that he turned down every invitation he got because he did not want to go with anyone but her.

Before the prom, Mr. Cocker and Ms. Brannigan make up and resolve their differences. At the prom, the students enjoy the band ("Wake Me Up Before You Go-Go (Reprise)"). The popular boys (Huey, Billy and Lionel) go to prom with the popular girls (Cyndi, Mel and Kim), however, Michael is left without a date. The students begin to dance together, Corey and Tiffany together at last ("{I've Had} The Time Of My Life"). Corey Snr. comes back out to tell the audience where everyone in his class ended up. He recalls his high school memories fondly, and leaves the stage, telling his younger self to have fun.

== Musical numbers ==
The song lists are different for: Australia and New Zealand; Canada and the United States; and the United Kingdom. Songs have been taken out and/or removed in each case. The full song list is below with country flags indicated for discrepancies between song list.

Act One

1. One of the following songs:
  - (Australia) (New Zealand) (Canada) (United States) "Wake Me Up Before You Go-Go" - Featured Male Singer and Three Backing Singers
  - (United Kingdom) "Kids in America" - Featured Female Singer with Full Student Ensemble
2. One of the following songs:
  - (Australia) (New Zealand) (Canada) (United States) "Kids in America" - Featured Female Singer with Full Student Ensemble
  - (United Kingdom) "Kids in America (Reprise)" - Full Student Ensemble
3. "Girls Just Want to Have Fun" - Tiffany, Cyndi, Mel and Kim with Female Student Ensemble
4. One of the following songs:
  - (Canada) (United States) "We Built This City" - Michael, Huey, Lionel and Billy with Male Student Ensemble
  - (Australia) (New Zealand) (United Kingdom) "Footloose" - Michael, Huey, Lionel and Billy with Male Student Ensemble
5. "Mickey" - Tiffany, Cyndi, Mel and Kim
6. "Michael's Election Rap" - Michael
7. "Video Killed the Radio Star" - Feargal with Laura and Debbie
8. One of the following songs:
  - (Canada) (United States) "Believe It or Not" (Theme Song from The Greatest American Hero) - Corey Jr. with Featured Singer
  - (Australia) (New Zealand) (United Kingdom) "Glory of Love" - Corey Jr. with Featured Male Singers such as Fergal
9. One of the following songs:
  - (Canada) (United States) "Morning Train (9 to 5)" - Laura, Debbie and Eileen
  - (Australia) (New Zealand) (United Kingdom) "Let's Hear It for the Boy" - Laura, Debbie and Eileen
10. "I'm Gonna Be (500 Miles)" - Corey Jr. and Michael
11. "You Give Love a Bad Name" - Corey Sr.
12. "You Give Love a Bad Name (Reprise)" - Mr. Cocker
13. "Man in the Mirror" - Mr. Cocker and Miss Brannigan with Full Student Ensemble

Act Two

1. One of the following songs:
  - (Canada) (United States) "Nothing's Gonna Stop Us Now" - Full Student Ensemble
  - (Australia) (New Zealand) (United Kingdom) "We Are the World" - Full Student Ensemble
2. (United Kingdom) "Dancing on the Ceiling" - Corey Jr., Featured Female Singer and Lionel with Full Student Ensemble
3. "Love Shack" - Corey Jr., Huey, Featured Female Singer, and Lionel with Full Student Ensemble
4. (Australia) (New Zealand) "Love Shack (Reprise)" - Full Student Ensemble and Lionel
5. "Total Eclipse of the Heart" - Corey Jr. with Miss Brannigan
6. (Australia) (New Zealand) "Nine to Five" - Kim, Mel, Cyndi and Tiffany
7. "Walking on Sunshine" - Eileen with Laura and Debbie
8. "Get Outta My Dreams, Get into My Car" - Michael and Tiffany, Cyndi, Mel and Kim, Huey, Billy and Lionel
9. "Centerfold" - Mr. Cocker with Full Student Ensemble
10. "Lost in Your Eyes" - Eileen and Tiffany
11. "Never Gonna Give You Up" - Billy with Three Female Backup Singers
12. "Material Girl" - Cyndi with Male Ensemble
13. "Don't Worry, Be Happy" / "Come On Eileen" - Corey Jr, Kirk and Alf
14. One of the following songs:
  - (Australia) (New Zealand) (Canada) (United States) "Wake Me Up Before You Go-Go (Reprise)" - Featured Male Singer
  - (United Kingdom) "The Final Countdown" - Featured Singer
15. "(I've Had) The Time of My Life" - Corey Jr. with Tiffany, Miss Brannigan with Mr. Cocker, and Fergal with Eileen
16. "Back to the 80's Megamix!" - Full Ensemble

== Instrumentation ==
Back To The 80's requires only a small band of musicians to perform. Instruments needed are two keyboards, an electric bass guitar, an electric guitar, a drum kit, an alto saxophone or a tenor saxophone, a trombone and a trumpet.
