= Neil Winstanley =

South African soccer player

Personal information
- Full name: Neil James Winstanley
- Date of birth: 25 August 1976 (age 50)
- Place of birth: Johannesburg, South Africa
- Height: 1.93 m (6 ft 4 in)
- Position: Central defender

Youth career
- Florida Albion
- Balfour Park

Senior career*
Years	Team	Apps	(Gls)
1995–1999	Wits University	43	(1)
1999–2000	Kaizer Chiefs	10	(1)
2000–2004	Wits University	97	(1)
2004–2007	Mamelodi Sundowns	33	(2)
2007–2010	Bidvest Wits	54	(0)

International career
2004	South Africa	5	(0)
- * Club domestic league appearances and goals

Neil Winstanley (born 25 August 1976) is a South African former soccer player who played as a defender. He represented South Africa at the 2004 African Nations Cup.
