= Miss Virginia World =

- Formation: 1951
- Type: Beauty pageant
- Headquarters: Midlothian
- Location: Virginia
- Members: Miss World America (1951–present)
- Official language: English
- State Director: Sabrina Vaz Barros
- Website: Official Website

The Miss Virginia World competition is a beauty pageant that selects the representative for Virginia in the Miss World America pageant.

The current Miss Virginia World is Catherine Perez of New York City, NY.

== Winners ==
Color key

- Declared as Winner/Ended as Miss World America
- Ended as runner-up
- Ended as one of the finalists or semifinalists
- Ended as special awards winner
- Ended as Miss USA

Year	Name	Hometown	Age (Note: Age at the time of the Miss World America pageant)	Placement at Miss World America	Special awards at Miss World America	Notes
2020	Catherine Perez	New York City, NY				
2019	Kyra Cromwell	Franklin	25			
2018	did not compete					
2017	Mollie Thorsen	Alexandria	25	Top 16		
2017	Sasha Perea	Richmond	23	Top 16		Previously 2nd Runner-Up at Miss World America 2016.
2017	Lili Klainer	Leesburg	24			
2016	Sasha Perea	Richmond	22	2nd Runner-Up	Beach Beauty	Later Top 16 semi-finalist at Miss World America 2017.
2016	Faatima Brown	Lorton	21			
2016	Natalie Macdisi	Virginia Beach	21			
2016	Yvette Blaess	Virginia Beach	24			
2015	Arielle Saige Rosmarino	Salem	23	4th Runner-Up	Best Introduction Video	Previously Miss Virginia USA 2014 and Top 20 semi-finalist at Miss USA 2014.
Miss Virginia United States 2014
2014	Phyllicia Whittingham					
Miss Virginia World
2013	No titleholders as Miss World America was designated from 2006 to 2013.					
2012	No titleholders as Miss World America was designated from 2006 to 2013.					
2011	No titleholders as Miss World America was designated from 2006 to 2013.					
2010	No titleholders as Miss World America was designated from 2006 to 2013.					
2009	No titleholders as Miss World America was designated from 2006 to 2013.					
2008	No titleholders as Miss World America was designated from 2006 to 2013.					
2007	No titleholders as Miss World America was designated from 2006 to 2013.					
2006	No titleholders as Miss World America was designated from 2006 to 2013.					
2005	No known representatives from Virginia from 2003 to 2005.					
2004	No known representatives from Virginia from 2003 to 2005.					
2003	No known representatives from Virginia from 2003 to 2005.					
2002	No titleholders as Miss World America was designated from 1995 to 2002.					
2001	No titleholders as Miss World America was designated from 1995 to 2002.					
2000	No titleholders as Miss World America was designated from 1995 to 2002.					
1999	No titleholders as Miss World America was designated from 1995 to 2002.					
1998	No titleholders as Miss World America was designated from 1995 to 2002.					
1997	No titleholders as Miss World America was designated from 1995 to 2002.					
1996	No titleholders as Miss World America was designated from 1995 to 2002.					
1995	No titleholders as Miss World America was designated from 1995 to 2002.					
1994	Chera Wood					
1993	Yu-Ping Fan					
1992	Regan Davis					
Miss Virginia USA 1981-1991
1991	Traci Dority	Fairfax				
1990	Evelyn Green	Richmond				
1989	Kimberly Nicewonder	Bristol			Miss Congeniality	Current director of the Miss Virginia USA and Miss Virginia Teen USA pageants under her married name, Kim Nicewonder-Johnson
1988	Denise Adrain Smith	Fairfax				
1987	Marsha Ralls	Alexandria	24	Top 11		
1986	Maureen McDonnell	Alexandria				Was a Cheerleader for Notre Dame.
1985	Dana Bryant	Richmond				Miss Teen All American 1984
1984	Leah Rush	Leesburg				
1983	Tai Collins	Virginia Beach				Model and actress whose credits include Baywatch and Playboy magazine, Television Writer and Producer whose credits include SAF3 and Baywatch.
1982	Sondra Dee Jones	Richmond	24	Top 12	Miss Photogenic	
1981	Pamela Elizabeth Hutchens	Newport News	22	Top 12		General District Court Judge in Virginia Beach, Virginia
Miss Virginia World
1980	Cathy Bohannon			1st Runner-Up		
1979	Carter Wilson	Harrisonburg	23	Miss World America 1979		Top 15 semi-finalist at Miss World 1979.
1978	Debbie Walker					
1977	Cindy Darlene Miller	Chesapeake	20	Miss World USA 1977		4th Runner-Up at Miss World 1977.
1976	Carolyn Jeanine Curtis			2nd Runner-Up		
1975	Debbie Joan Evans					
1974	Patricia Lynn Bailey	Norfolk	19			Later Miss American Beauty 1975 (Miss U.S. International 1975). 3rd Runner-Up at Miss International 1975, as Miss American Beauty (USA).
1973	Lauren Ann Riley			Top 16		
1972	Marie Ann Hunderleiter	Norfolk	22	Top 7		
1971	Carolyn Rea Martin					
1970	Patricia A. Moldovan			3rd Runner-Up		
1969	Gail Renshaw	Arlington	22	Miss World USA 1969 (then resigned)		1st Runner-Up at Miss World 1969. Renshaw later resigned, after competing in Miss World, to get married. The Miss World USA title then passed to the 1st Runner-Up of Miss World USA 1969, Connie Lee Hagard of Texas.
1968	Deborah Shelton	Norfolk	19	1st Runner-Up		Later Miss Virginia USA 1970 and Miss USA 1970. 1st Runner-Up at Miss Universe 1970, as U.S.A..
1967	Brenda Maddox			Top 15		
1966	Patricia Rae Shaper			2nd Runner-Up		
1965	Cathy Jean Cornell					
1964	did not compete					
1963	Faye Miriam Amy Atkinson					
1962	Laurie Mills					
1961	Laurie Mills					
1960	Patricia Buck					
1959	No known representatives from Virginia in 1958 & 1959.					
1958	No known representatives from Virginia in 1958 & 1959.					
Miss Virginia USA 1953-1957
1957	Patricia Bush	Portsmouth				
1956	Audra Stark	Virginia Beach				
1955	Jeannie Asble	Portsmouth				
1954	Ellen Whitehead	Chatham		1st Runner-Up (later dethroned for being underage)		
1953	Dorothy Lee Bailey	Norfolk				
Miss Virginia World
1952	No known representatives from the Virginia in 1951 & 1952.					
1951	No known representatives from the Virginia in 1951 & 1952.					

Notes to table
