= Miss North Carolina World =

- Formation: 1951
- Type: Beauty pageant
- Headquarters: Fayetteville
- Location: North Carolina
- Members: Miss World America (1951–present)
- Official language: English
- State Director: Kathy Keefe Jensen
- Website: Official Website

Miss North Carolina World is an American state beauty pageant that selects a representative for the Miss World America national competition from the State of North Carolina. The pageant is headquartered in Fayetteville, Cumberland County, and is currently directed by Kathy Keefe Jensen, who serves as State Director.

To date, four women from North Carolina have been crowned Miss World America:

- Debra Jean Freeze, 1978
- Carrie Ann Stroup, 2001
- Rebekah Chantay Revels, 2002
- Elizabeth Safrit Scott, 2014

== Winners ==
Color key

- Declared as Winner/Ended as Miss World America
- Ended as runner-up
- Ended as one of the finalists or semifinalists
- Ended as special awards winner
- Ended as Miss USA

Year	Name	Hometown	Age (Note: Age at the time of the Miss World America pageant)	Placement at Miss World America	Special awards at Miss World America	Notes
2025	TBA	TBA	TBA	TBA		
2023	Tisha Abdul	Concord	19		Beauty With A Purpose Ambassador for the Northeast Region of the United States	
2019	Peyton Brown	Dunn	18	2nd Runner-Up		1st Runner-Up at Miss North Carolina's Outstanding Teen 2018; Later Miss North Carolina Teen USA 2020.
2018	Shivali Patel	Raleigh	21	2nd Runner-Up		
2018	Sania Laraib	Raleigh	21	Top 10		
2017	Shivali Patel	Raleigh	20	Top 16		
2017	Nicole Owens	Lumberton	19			
2016	Shivali Patel	Raleigh	19	1st Runner-Up		Previously NAMiss North Carolina Jr. Teen 2011 and 2nd Runner-Up at NAM Jr. Teen 2011.
2015	Selena Price	Huntersville	19			
Miss North Carolina United States 2014
2014	Elizabeth Safrit	Kannapolis	22	Miss United States 2014/Miss World America 2014		2nd Runner-Up at Miss World 2014.
Miss North Carolina World
2013	No titleholders as Miss World America was designated from 2006 to 2013.					
2012	No titleholders as Miss World America was designated from 2006 to 2013.					
2011	No titleholders as Miss World America was designated from 2006 to 2013.					
2010	No titleholders as Miss World America was designated from 2006 to 2013.					
2009	No titleholders as Miss World America was designated from 2006 to 2013.					
2008	No titleholders as Miss World America was designated from 2006 to 2013.					
2007	No titleholders as Miss World America was designated from 2006 to 2013.					
2006	No titleholders as Miss World America was designated from 2006 to 2013.					
2005	No known representatives from North Carolina from 2003 to 2005.					
2004	No known representatives from North Carolina from 2003 to 2005.					
2003	No known representatives from North Carolina from 2003 to 2005.					
2002	No titleholders as Miss World America was designated from 1995 to 2002.					
2001	No titleholders as Miss World America was designated from 1995 to 2002.					
2000	No titleholders as Miss World America was designated from 1995 to 2002.					
1999	No titleholders as Miss World America was designated from 1995 to 2002.					
1998	No titleholders as Miss World America was designated from 1995 to 2002.					
1997	No titleholders as Miss World America was designated from 1995 to 2002.					
1996	No titleholders as Miss World America was designated from 1995 to 2002.					
1995	No titleholders as Miss World America was designated from 1995 to 2002.					
1994	Michelle Mauney	Stanley		Top 7		Later Miss North Carolina USA 1995 and competed in Miss USA 1995.
1993	Vicki Johnson					
1992	Shanna Phillips			Top 10		
Miss North Carolina USA 1981–1991
1991	Pat Arnold	Chapel Hill	21	Top 6 (5th place)	Miss Photogenic	
1990	Altman Allen	Shelby				
1989	Jacqueline Padgette	Hobgood				
1988	Tammy Tolar	Fayetteville				
1987	Donna Wilson	Davidson				
1986	Rhonda Nobles	Fayetteville	20	Top 10		
1985	Kate Kenney	Raleigh				
1984	Cookie Noak	Hickory	23	Top 10		
1983	Allison Payge Pinson	Mooresville				
1982	Jeannie Boger	Sanford				Mother of Miss USA 2009 Kristen Dalton (Miss North Carolina USA 2009) and Miss North Carolina Teen USA 2008 Julia Dalton (second-runner up at Miss Teen USA 2008).
1981	Lisa Swift	Southport				
Miss North Carolina World
1980	Monica Boston			Top 15		
1979	Deborah Ann Fountain	Bronx, NY		Top 8		Later Miss New York USA 1981. Later competed in Miss USA 1981, as New York, but was disqualified after being found to have padded her swimsuit.
1978	Debra Jean Freeze	Mooresville	20	Miss World America 1978		Top 15 semi-finalist at Miss World 1978.
1977	Betty Lou Hutchinson					
1976	Sharon Denise Smith				Miss Congeniality	
1975	Tonda Brown					
1974	Gail Lynn Hinton					
1973	Doris E. Davis					
1972	Julia Ann Lane					
1971	Terri Lee Horn					
1970	Judith Ellen Steed					
1969	did not compete					
1968	did not compete					
1967	Brenda Carol Ray			Top 7		
1966	Ann Elizabeth Bailey					
1965	Jean Parson Pender					
1964	Susan Harrill			Top 15		
1963	did not compete					
1962	Louise Furr			Top 15		
1961	Betsy Medlin					
1960	Rita Souther			3rd Runner-Up		
1959	No known representatives from North Carolina in 1958 & 1959.					
1958	No known representatives from North Carolina in 1958 & 1959.					
Miss North Carolina USA 1953–1957
1957	Peggy Dennis	Lilesville				
1956	Shirley Bagwell	Raleigh	18	Top 15		
1955	Mary Ratliffe	Wadesboro				
1954	Ann Pickett	Charlotte				
1953	Libby Walker	Wilton				
Miss North Carolina World
1952	No known representatives from the North Carolina in 1951 & 1952.					
1951	No known representatives from the North Carolina in 1951 & 1952.					

Notes to table
