= Miss Florida World =

- Formation: 1951
- Type: Beauty pageant
- Headquarters: Miami
- Location: Florida
- Members: Miss World America (1951–present)
- Official language: English
- State Director: Sharon Flynn Belden Polo
- Website: Official website

Miss Florida World is an American state beauty pageant that selects a representative for the Miss World America national competition from the State of Florida. The pageant is headquartered in Miami, Miami-Dade County, and is currently directed by Sharon Flynn Belden Polo, who serves as State Director.

To date, five women from Florida have been crowned Miss World America:

- Terry Ann Browning, 1974
- Clotilde Helen Cabrera, 1987
- Sharon Flynn Belden, 1992
- Merica Lane Lindell, 2008
- Clarissa Miriam Bowers, 2017

== Winners ==
Color key

- Declared as Winner/Ended as Miss World America
- Ended as runner-up
- Ended as one of the finalists or semifinalists
- Ended as special awards winner
- Ended as Miss USA

Year	Name	Hometown	Age (Note: Age at the time of the Miss World America pageant)	Placement at Miss World America	Special awards at Miss World America	Notes
2020	Jasity Rush	Gainesville	25			
2019	Lekha Ravi	Miami	26			Later a contestant on season 27 of The Bachelor
2018	Ashley Barreto	Kissimmee	24			Later Miss Florida USA 2021 and Miss Universe Puerto Rico 2022 as Ashley Cariño
2017	Clarissa Bowers	Umatilla	20	Miss World America 2017	Top Model	Top 40 semifinalist at Miss World 2017.
2017	Louina LaFalaise	Boynton Beach	25	Top 10		
2017	Tori Miller	Gainesville	22			
2016	Ramina Ashfaque	Jacksonville	25			Later Miss Pakistan World 2016 and a contestant at Miss Earth 2017, representing Pakistan.
2015	Kailyn Perez	Tampa	23	Top 12	People's Choice	Later Miss Pennsylvania USA 2019 and Top 15 semifinalist at Miss USA 2019, representing Pennsylvania.
Miss Florida United States 2014
2014	Tia McDonald	Gainesville	20	Top 10		
Miss Florida World
2013	No titleholders as Miss World America was designated from 2006 to 2013.					
2012	No titleholders as Miss World America was designated from 2006 to 2013.					
2011	No titleholders as Miss World America was designated from 2006 to 2013.					
2010	No titleholders as Miss World America was designated from 2006 to 2013.					
2009	No titleholders as Miss World America was designated from 2006 to 2013.					
2008	No titleholders as Miss World America was designated from 2006 to 2013.					
2007	No titleholders as Miss World America was designated from 2006 to 2013.					
2006	No titleholders as Miss World America was designated from 2006 to 2013.					
2005	No known representatives from Florida from 2003 to 2005.					
2004	No known representatives from Florida from 2003 to 2005.					
2003	No known representatives from Florida from 2003 to 2005.					
2002	No titleholders as Miss World America was designated from 1995 to 2002.					
2001	No titleholders as Miss World America was designated from 1995 to 2002.					
2000	No titleholders as Miss World America was designated from 1995 to 2002.					
1999	No titleholders as Miss World America was designated from 1995 to 2002.					
1998	No titleholders as Miss World America was designated from 1995 to 2002.					
1997	No titleholders as Miss World America was designated from 1995 to 2002.					
1996	No titleholders as Miss World America was designated from 1995 to 2002.					
1995	No titleholders as Miss World America was designated from 1995 to 2002.					
1994	Jessica White					
1993	Julianne Morris					
1992	Sharon Flynn Belden	Coral Gables	25	Miss World America 1992		Previously Miss Florida USA 1992. Top 10 semifinalist at Miss World 1992. The current State Director for Miss Florida World under her married name Sharon Belden Polo.
Miss Florida USA 1981-1991
1991	Rosa Velilla	Miami				
1990	Tricia Hahn	Panama City				
1989	Jennifer Parker	Tallahassee	17			
1988	Monica Farrell	Jacksonville		3rd Runner-Up		Previously Miss Florida 1985
1987	Clotilde Helen Cabrera	Tampa	22	Miss World USA 1987		First African-America to win Miss Florida USA and Later Miss World USA 1987 and competed at Miss World 1987.
1986	Kathy Rosenwinkel	Orlando				
1985	Barbi Losh	North Miami Beach				
1984	Stacy Hassfurder	Tallahassee				
1983	Janet Chesser	Daytona Beach				
1982	Lisa Marie Smith	Margate				Previously Miss Florida World 1980 and Top 8 finalist in Miss World America 1980.
1981	Valerie Lundeen	Miami				Valerie Lundeen Ely, 62, married to "Tarzan" actor Ron Ely, was murdered by their son Cameron Ely at their Southern California home on Oct. 15, 2019.
Miss Florida World
1980	Lisa Marie Smith	Margate		Top 8		Later Miss Florida USA 1982.
1979	Eugenia Rywant					
1978	Lynn Hafter					
1977	Janet Gail Wilson			2nd Runner-Up		
1976	Nanci E. Hirtreiter			3rd Runner-Up		
1975	Victoria Jean Bass					
1974	Terry Ann Browning	Ormond Beach	20	Miss World USA 1974		
1973	Denise Ann Kranich			3rd Runner-Up		
1972	Sandra Leland			3rd Runner-Up		
1971	Anita L. Senno			Top 18		
1970	Gloria Dee Campbell			Top 10		
1969	Deborah Anyzeski			4th Runner-Up		
1968	Stephanie Herold					
1967	Cathie Parker					
1966	Christine Anne Fisher			1st Runner-Up		
1965	Mary Anna Duncan					
1964	Carole Hale					
1963	Lanita Gayle Kent	Miami		Top 15		Previously Miss Miami Press Photographer 1963 and 1st Runner-Up at the 1963 National Press Photographer's Pageant.
1962	Lithona Rozier			1st Runner-Up		
1961	Lynne Shirley					
1960	Unknown					
1959	No known representatives from Florida in 1958 & 1959.					
1958	No known representatives from Florida in 1958 & 1959.					
Miss Florida USA 1953-1957
1957	Deanie Cates					Competed as Florida.
1957	Faye Ray	Miami Beach				Competed as Miami Beach, FL.
1956	Kim Meyer					Competed as Florida.
1956	Beverly Rogers	Miami Beach; Maywood, NJ				Competed as Miami Beach, FL. Miss New Jersey USA 1955 and competed at Miss USA 1955 as New Jersey.
1955	Marlies Gessler			Top 15		Competed as Florida.
1955	Beverly Masters	Miami Beach				Competed as Miami Beach, FL.
1954	Rosemary Talucci					Competed as Florida.
1953	Kay Duggar	Miami Beach		Top 20		Competed as Miami Beach, FL.
Miss Florida World
1952	No known representatives from Florida in 1951 & 1952.					
1951	No known representatives from Florida in 1951 & 1952.					

Notes to table
