= Miss Oklahoma World =

Beauty pageant competition

- Formation: 1951
- Type: Beauty pageant
- Members: Miss World America (1951–present)
- Official language: English
- State Director: Michael Galanes
- Website: Official Website

The Miss Oklahoma World competition is a beauty pageant that selects the representative for Oklahoma in the Miss World America pageant.

The current Miss Oklahoma World is Priscilla Wang of Oklahoma City.

== Winners ==
Color key

- Declared as Winner/Ended as Miss World America
- Ended as runner-up
- Ended as one of the finalists or semifinalists
- Ended as special awards winner
- Ended as Miss USA

Year	Name	Hometown	Age (Note: Age at the time of the Miss World America pageant)	Placement at Miss World America	Special awards at Miss World America	Notes
2020	did not compete					
2019	Priscilla Wang	Oklahoma City	25			
2018	did not compete					
2017	did not compete					
2016	did not compete					
2015	Ivana Hall	Oklahoma City	25	Top 22	Best in Evening Gown	Previously Miss Texas 2013 and Top 10 semi-finalist at Miss America 2014, representing Texas.
Miss Oklahoma United States 2014
2014	Alexys Razien					
Miss Oklahoma World
2013	No titleholders as Miss World America was designated from 2006 to 2013.					
2012	No titleholders as Miss World America was designated from 2006 to 2013.					
2011	No titleholders as Miss World America was designated from 2006 to 2013.					
2010	No titleholders as Miss World America was designated from 2006 to 2013.					
2009	No titleholders as Miss World America was designated from 2006 to 2013.					
2008	No titleholders as Miss World America was designated from 2006 to 2013.					
2007	No titleholders as Miss World America was designated from 2006 to 2013.					
2006	No titleholders as Miss World America was designated from 2006 to 2013.					
2005	No known representatives from Oklahoma from 2003 to 2005.					
2004	No known representatives from Oklahoma from 2003 to 2005.					
2003	No known representatives from Oklahoma from 2003 to 2005.					
2002	No titleholders as Miss World America was designated from 1995 to 2002.					
2001	No titleholders as Miss World America was designated from 1995 to 2002.					
2000	No titleholders as Miss World America was designated from 1995 to 2002.					
1999	No titleholders as Miss World America was designated from 1995 to 2002.					
1998	No titleholders as Miss World America was designated from 1995 to 2002.					
1997	No titleholders as Miss World America was designated from 1995 to 2002.					
1996	No titleholders as Miss World America was designated from 1995 to 2002.					
1995	No titleholders as Miss World America was designated from 1995 to 2002.					
1994	Penny Smith					
1993	Carrie Oliver					
1992	Lisa Watson					
Miss Oklahoma USA 1981-1991
1991	Julie Khoury	Oklahoma City	22	Top 6		Previously Miss Oklahoma Teen USA 1985.
1990	Lauralynn Norton	Tulsa	22			Spokesmodel on Star Search 1990, Toured with USO '90
1989	Jill Scheffert	Oklahoma City	20	Miss World USA 1989		4th Runner-Up at Miss World 1989.
1988	Tamara Walker	Norman	18	Top 10		
1987	Dyan Rody	Oklahoma City				
1986	Teresa Lucas	Oklahoma City	23	Top 10		Assumed the state title when the original winner resigned shortly after winner the state crown.
1985	Sophia Henderson	Tulsa	23	Top 10		
1984	Julia Murdock	Shawnee	18	Top 10		
1983	Mignon Merchant	Oklahoma City	22	Top 12		Later Miss Oklahoma 1986.
1982	Jill Liebmann	Oklahoma City				Mother of Lauren Hudman, Miss Nevada Teen USA 2008 and Britney Barnhart Miss Nevada Teen USA 2018, and Mrs. Nevada 2016.
1981	Stacey Loach	Oklahoma City				
Miss Oklahoma World
1980	Kathy Ecker					
1979	Lesa Jane Sadler					
1978	Robin Keene			Top 8		
1977	Sandy L. Schwarz					
1976	Shawn Robette Cook					
1975	Waukita Gaddy					
1974	Brenda Lisa Barr					
1973	Rebecca O'Haver			2nd Runner-Up		
1972	Rita Jo Fitzgerald			2nd Runner-Up		
1971	did not compete					
1970	Angella Joyce Clement					
1969	did not compete					
1968	did not compete					
1967	did not compete					
1966	did not compete					
1965	did not compete					
1964	Mickey Moffit					
1963	Glynda Quinn					
1962	did not compete					
1961	did not compete					
1960	did not compete					
1959	No known representatives from Oklahoma in 1958 & 1959.					
1958	No known representatives from Oklahoma in 1958 & 1959.					
Miss Oklahoma USA 1953-1957
1957	Rose Mary Raab	Oklahoma City				
1956	did not compete					
1955	did not compete					
1954	did not compete					
1953	Barbara Bond	Oklahoma City				
Miss Oklahoma World
1952	No known representatives from Oklahoma in 1951 & 1952.					
1951	No known representatives from Oklahoma in 1951 & 1952.					

Notes to table
