= Miss Ohio World =

- Formation: 1951
- Type: Beauty pageant
- Location: Ohio
- Members: Miss World America (1951–present)
- Official language: English
- State Director: Christi Woolard
- Website: Official website

The Miss Ohio World competition, also referred to as Miss World America Ohio, is a beauty pageant that selects the representative for Ohio in the Miss World America pageant.

== Gallery of titleholders ==
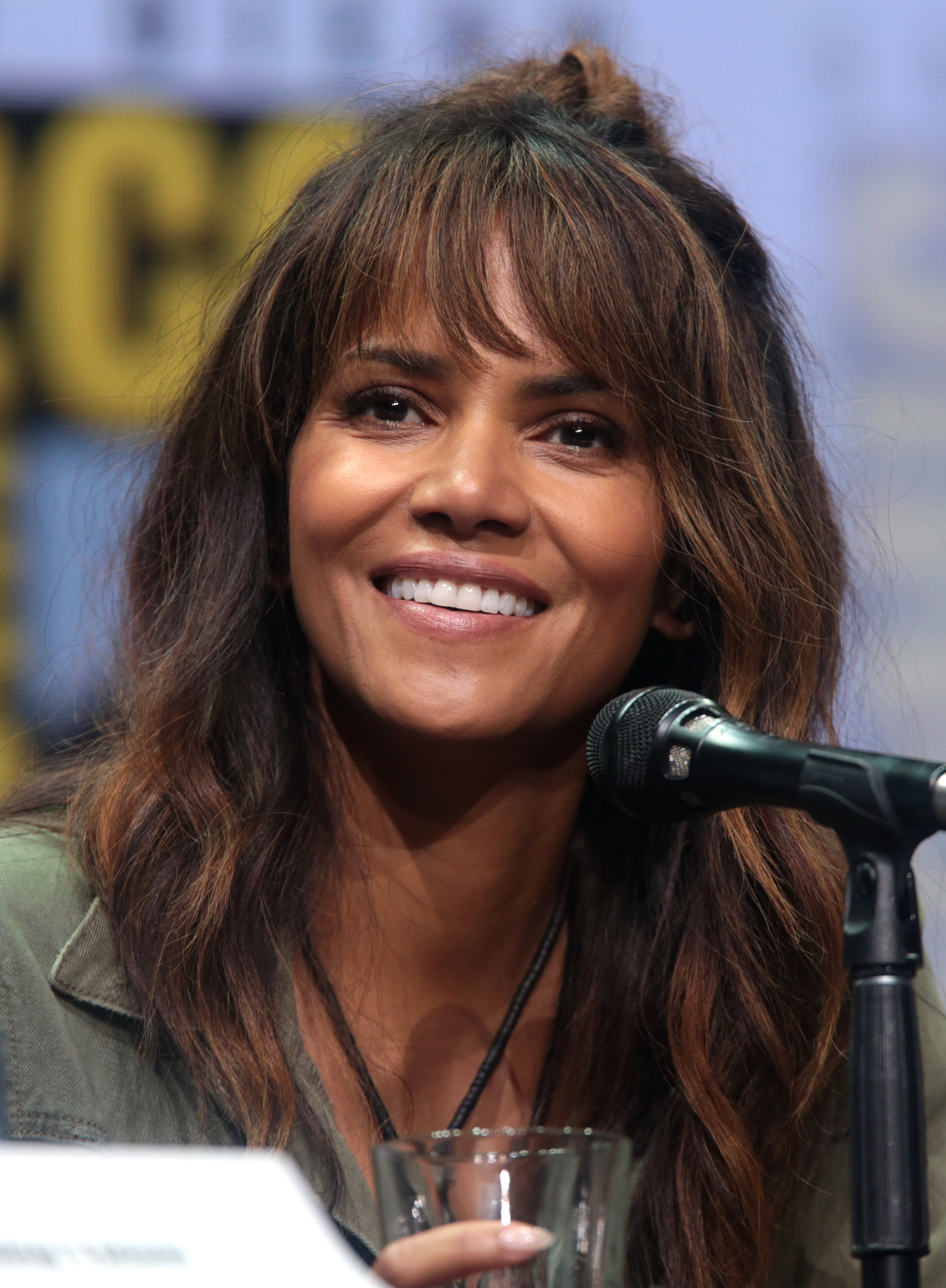
Halle Berry, Miss Ohio USA 1986 and Miss World USA 1986

== Winners ==
Color key

- Declared as Winner/Ended as Miss World America
- Ended as runner-up
- Ended as one of the finalists or semifinalists
- Ended as special awards winner
- Ended as Miss USA

Year	Name	Hometown	Age (Note: Age at the time of the Miss World America pageant)	Placement at Miss World America	Special awards at Miss World America	Notes
2020	Tori Nelson	Mason	22			
2019	Kaamilah Wahid	Akron	25	Top 25		
2018	did not compete					
2017	Krithika Rajkumar	Cleveland	25	Top 10	Multimedia	
2016	did not compete					
2015	Chelsie Folden	Wellston	23	Top 22		Previously Miss Ohio Teen USA 2008 and Miss Ohio United States 2014. Top 16 semi-finalist at Miss United States 2014 and unplaced at Miss Teen USA 2008.
Miss Ohio United States 2014
2014	Chelsie Folden	Wellston	22	Top 16		Later Miss Ohio World 2015 and Top 22 semifinalist at Miss World America 2015.
Miss Ohio World
2013	No titleholders as Miss World America was designated from 2006 to 2013.					
2012	No titleholders as Miss World America was designated from 2006 to 2013.					
2011	No titleholders as Miss World America was designated from 2006 to 2013.					
2010	No titleholders as Miss World America was designated from 2006 to 2013.					
2009	No titleholders as Miss World America was designated from 2006 to 2013.					
2008	No titleholders as Miss World America was designated from 2006 to 2013.					
2007	No titleholders as Miss World America was designated from 2006 to 2013.					
2006	No titleholders as Miss World America was designated from 2006 to 2013.					
2005	No known representatives from Ohio from 2003 to 2005.					
2004	No known representatives from Ohio from 2003 to 2005.					
2003	No known representatives from Ohio from 2003 to 2005.					
2002	No titleholders as Miss World America was designated from 1995 to 2002.					
2001	No titleholders as Miss World America was designated from 1995 to 2002.					
2000	No titleholders as Miss World America was designated from 1995 to 2002.					
1999	No titleholders as Miss World America was designated from 1995 to 2002.					
1998	No titleholders as Miss World America was designated from 1995 to 2002.					
1997	No titleholders as Miss World America was designated from 1995 to 2002.					
1996	No titleholders as Miss World America was designated from 1995 to 2002.					
1995	No titleholders as Miss World America was designated from 1995 to 2002.					
1994	Marcia Mcguire					
1993	Raquel Eatmon					
1992	Lisa Allison					
Miss Ohio USA 1981–1991
1991	Amy Glaze	Lucasville				
1990	Melissa Proctor	West Chester	22	Semi-finalist		Current director of Michigan, Ohio and Kentucky (both Miss USA and Teen USA) pageants under her married name, Melissa Proctor-Pitchford
1989	Lisa Thompson	Marion				
1988	Gina West	Pickerington				
1987	Hallie Bonnell	Akron				Later Mrs. Illinois America 2007; Mrs. Photogenic winner at Mrs. America 2007 under her married name, Hallie Thompson.; Mother of Christina Thompson, Miss New Jersey Teen USA 2013 and Miss Virginia USA 2021
1986	Halle Berry	Oakwood	19	Miss World USA 1986		5th Runner-Up at Miss World 1986, actress and Academy Award winner, Miss Teen All American 1985
1985	Lisa Barlow	Vandalia				
1984	Roxi Erwin	Pickerington				
1983	Gina Gangale	Youngstown				
1982	Kim Weeda	Dayton	21	3rd Runner-Up		
1981	Kimberly "Kim" Seelbrede	Germantown	20	Miss USA 1981		Top 12 semi-finalist at Miss Universe 1981, as United States.
Miss Ohio World
1980	Nancy J. Stepien					
1979	Kathleen King					
1978	Lesa Rummell	Paris	20			Previously Miss Ohio USA 1977.
1977	Deborah K. Thorne					
1976	Linda Velentine					
1975	Annelise Ilschenko	Middleburg Heights	17	Miss World USA 1975		Unplaced at Miss World 1975.
1974	Jacqueline "Jackie" M. Urbanek	Cleveland				Previously Miss Ohio USA 1973.
1973	Joan Marie Rankin			Top 16		
1972	Vicki Lane Hess					
1971	Shirley Malin			Top 18		
1970	Charleen Heinisch			Top 10		
1969	Wendy Ann Bayless	Mentor				
1968	Judith Metcalf					Competed as Ohio
1968	Kathy Baumann	Cleveland				Competed as Cleveland, OH
1967	Phyllis Jeanne Darling					Competed as Ohio
1967	Peggy Chuey	Cleveland				Competed as Cleveland, OH
1966	Cindy Oliver			Top 7		Competed as Ohio
1966	Janice Galub	Cleveland				Competed as Cleveland, OH
1965	Jeanne Marie Bromley					Competed as Ohio
1965	Becky Burden	Cleveland				Competed as Cleveland, OH
1964	Sharon Hoefling			Top 7		Competed as Ohio
1964	Sally Shrader	Columbus		Top 15		Competed as Columbus, OH
1963	Diane Budan			2nd Runner-Up		Competed as Ohio; Later 2nd Runner-Up at Miss American Beauty 1964 (Miss U.S. International 1964).
1963	Betsy Nittoli	Boardman				Competed as Boardman, OH
1962	Glyn Warstler					Competed as Ohio
1962	Andrea Jean Getzlaff	Cleveland				Competed as Cleveland, OH
1961	Judith Kay Tewalt					Competed as Ohio
1960	Barbara Stagge					Competed as Ohio
1960	Darlene DiPasquale	Cincinnati				Competed as Cincinnati, OH
1959	No known representatives from Ohio in 1958 & 1959.					
1958	No known representatives from Ohio in 1958 & 1959.					
Miss Ohio USA 1953–1957
1957	Kathryn Gabriel	Cleveland	20	Top 16/4th Runner-Up		Originally a Top 16 semi-finalist. She was the 6th highest scoring semi-finalist in the finals. Gabriel was later elevated to the position of 4th Runner-Up after the original winner of Miss USA was dethroned and all runner-ups were moved up a position with the 1st Runner-Up becoming Miss USA.
1956	Eleanor Wood	Canton	18	Top 15		
1955	Carol Hagerman	Columbus				
1954	Barbara Randa	Painesville	19	Top 19		
1953	Eleanore Mack	Bellaire	20	Top 20		
Miss Ohio World
1952	No known representatives from the Ohio in 1951 & 1952.					
1951	No known representatives from the Ohio in 1951 & 1952.					

Notes to table
