= Miss South Carolina World =

- Formation: 1951
- Type: Beauty pageant
- Headquarters: Fayetteville, NC
- Location: North Carolina
- Members: Miss World America (1951–present)
- Official language: English
- State Director: Kathy Keefe Jensen
- Website: Official Website

Miss South Carolina World is an American state beauty pageant that selects a representative for the Miss World America national competition from the State of South Carolina. The pageant is headquartered in Fayetteville, Cumberland County, and is currently directed by Kathy Keefe Jensen, who serves as State Director.

To date, three women from South Carolina have been crowned Miss World America:

- Mary Kemp Griffin, 1953
- Betty Lane Cherry, 1956
- Gina Marie Tolleson, 1990

== Winners ==
Color key

- Declared as Winner/Ended as Miss World America
- Ended as runner-up
- Ended as one of the finalists or semifinalists
- Ended as special awards winner
- Ended as Miss USA

Year	Name	Hometown	Age (Note: Age at the time of the Miss World America pageant)	Placement at Miss World America	Special awards at Miss World America	Notes
2020	Megan Gordon	North Augusta	27	1st Runner-Up	Top Interview	Previously Miss South Carolina 2017 and Top 5 finalist at Miss USA 2017.
2019	Megan Gordon	North Augusta	26	1st Runner-Up		Previously Miss South Carolina 2017 and Top 5 finalist at Miss USA 2017.
2018	did not compete					
2017	did not compete					
2016	did not compete					
2015	Dawn Logg	Myrtle Beach	22			
Miss South Carolina United States 2014
2014	Mae-Ann Webb			1st Runner-Up		
Miss South Carolina World
2013	No titleholders as Miss World America was designated from 2006 to 2013.					
2012	No titleholders as Miss World America was designated from 2006 to 2013.					
2011	No titleholders as Miss World America was designated from 2006 to 2013.					
2010	No titleholders as Miss World America was designated from 2006 to 2013.					
2009	No titleholders as Miss World America was designated from 2006 to 2013.					
2008	No titleholders as Miss World America was designated from 2006 to 2013.					
2007	No titleholders as Miss World America was designated from 2006 to 2013.					
2006	No titleholders as Miss World America was designated from 2006 to 2013.					
2005	No known representatives from South Carolina from 2003 to 2005.					
2004	No known representatives from South Carolina from 2003 to 2005.					
2003	No known representatives from South Carolina from 2003 to 2005.					
2002	No titleholders as Miss World America was designated from 1995 to 2002.					
2001	No titleholders as Miss World America was designated from 1995 to 2002.					
2000	No titleholders as Miss World America was designated from 1995 to 2002.					
1999	No titleholders as Miss World America was designated from 1995 to 2002.					
1998	No titleholders as Miss World America was designated from 1995 to 2002.					
1997	No titleholders as Miss World America was designated from 1995 to 2002.					
1996	No titleholders as Miss World America was designated from 1995 to 2002.					
1995	No titleholders as Miss World America was designated from 1995 to 2002.					
1994	Michelle Pitts					
1993	Audra Yolanda Wallace			2nd Runner-Up		
1992	Reid Swofford					
Miss South Carolina USA 1981-1991
1991	Traci Rufty	Columbia	21			
1990	Gina Tolleson	Spartanburg	20	Miss World USA 1990		Later won Miss World 1990.
1989	Angela Shuler	Rock Hill	21			Previously Miss South Carolina Teen USA 1986
1988	April Abel	Johnston	20	Top 10		
1987	Elizabeth Woodard	Aiken	21			Previously Miss South Carolina Teen USA 1983
1986	Maribeth Curry	Mauldin	20	Top 10		
1985	Ann Margarete Hughes	Charleston				
1984	Ginger Greer	Lugoff				
1983	Allison Grisso	Columbia	21	2nd Runner-Up		
1982	Margo Wood	Columbia				
1981	Zade Turner	Myrtle Beach	21			
Miss South Carolina World
1980	Donna Rice			Top 15		
1979	Lynn Boyles					
1978	Cynthia Wynn			Top 8		
1977	Teresia Ann Woods					
1976	Sandra Rene Wilson					
1975	Vicki Corley					
1974	Donna Lynn McFarland					
1973	Claudie Ruth Bell			Top 16		
1972	Faye M. Breland			Top 7		
1971	Debra Carol Cooper			Top 18		
1970	Eleanor Susan Gordon	Rock Hill				Later Miss South Carolina USA 1972 and Top 12 semi-finalist at Miss USA 1972.
1969	Carolyn Vernon					
1968	did not compete					
1967	Penny Rebecca Mikell			Top 15		
1966	Linda Parrish					
1965	Victoria "Vicky" Elizabeth Johnson					
1964	Nancy Sanders			Top 15		
1963	Cecelia McBride Yoder					Previously Miss South Carolina USA 1963 and Top 15 semi-finalist at Miss USA 1963.
1962	Nancy Ann Harrison					
1961	Judy Austin					Competed as South Carolina
1961	Rita Souther	Spartanburg				Competed as Spartanburg, South Carolina.
1960	Dianne Taff					
1959	No known representatives from South Carolina in 1958 & 1959.					
1958	No known representatives from South Carolina in 1958 & 1959.					
Miss South Carolina USA 1953-1957
1957	Jean Spotts			Top 15		
1956	Betty Lane Cherry	Columbia	20	Miss World USA 1956		1st Runner-Up at Miss World 1956.
1955	Sara Stone			Top 15		
1954	Miriam Stevenson	Winnsboro	21	Miss USA 1954		Later won Miss Universe 1954, as USA.
1953	Mary Kemp Griffin	Myrtle Beach	23	Miss World USA 1953		She competed as Myrtle Beach, South Carolina, then represented the US at Miss World 1953, and placed 4th Runner-Up.
1953	Susan Anthony Day			Top 20		Competed as South Carolina.
Miss South Carolina World
1952	No known representatives from South Carolina in 1951 & 1952.					
1951	No known representatives from South Carolina in 1951 & 1952.					

Notes to table
