= Miss Indiana World =

Beauty pageant in Indiana, USA

- Formation: 1951
- Type: Beauty pageant
- Location: Indiana
- Members: Miss World America (1951–present)
- Official language: English
- State Director: Madison Flomer
- Website: Official Website

The Miss Indiana World competition is a beauty pageant that selects the representative for Indiana in the Miss World America pageant.

The 2019 Miss Indiana World is Jessica Hopper of Remington.

== Winners ==
Color key

- Declared as Winner/Ended as Miss World America
- Ended as runner-up
- Ended as one of the finalists or semifinalists
- Ended as special awards winner
- Ended as Miss USA

Year	Name	Hometown	Age (Note: Age at the time of the Miss World America pageant)	Placement at Miss World America	Special awards at Miss World America	Notes
2021	No titleholder due to Miss World America not being designated/appointed.					
2020	did not compete					
2019	Jessica Hopper	Remington	26	Top 10		
2018	did not compete					
2017	did not compete					
2016	did not compete					
2015	Alexandra Syndram	Fishers	18			
Miss Indiana United States 2014
2014	Sylvia Crowder					
Miss Indiana World
2013	No titleholders as Miss World America were designated from 2006 to 2013.					
2012	No titleholders as Miss World America were designated from 2006 to 2013.					
2011	No titleholders as Miss World America were designated from 2006 to 2013.					
2010	No titleholders as Miss World America were designated from 2006 to 2013.					
2009	No titleholders as Miss World America were designated from 2006 to 2013.					
2008	No titleholders as Miss World America were designated from 2006 to 2013.					
2007	No titleholders as Miss World America were designated from 2006 to 2013.					
2006	No titleholders as Miss World America were designated from 2006 to 2013.					
2005	No known representatives from Indiana from 2003 to 2005.					
2004	No known representatives from Indiana from 2003 to 2005.					
2003	No known representatives from Indiana from 2003 to 2005.					
2002	No titleholders as Miss World America were designated from 1995 to 2002.					
2001	No titleholders as Miss World America were designated from 1995 to 2002.					
2000	No titleholders as Miss World America were designated from 1995 to 2002.					
1999	No titleholders as Miss World America were designated from 1995 to 2002.					
1998	No titleholders as Miss World America were designated from 1995 to 2002.					
1997	No titleholders as Miss World America were designated from 1995 to 2002.					
1996	No titleholders as Miss World America were designated from 1995 to 2002.					
1995	No titleholders as Miss World America were designated from 1995 to 2002.					
1994	Shelly McKown					
1993	Heather Gray					
1992	Lesa Walker					
Miss Indiana USA 1981-1991
1991	Cathi Bennett	New Albany	24			
1990	Meri Buker	Kokomo	24			
1989	Gwen Volpe					
1988	Loetta Earnest	East Chicago	22			
1987	Alecia Masalkoski	Bremen				Previously Miss Michigan 1985
1986	Diane Andrysiak	South Bend				
1985	Theresa Hobbs	Wilmington				
1984	Susan Willardo	Highland				
1983	Toni Yudt	Portage				
1982	Sara Binkley	Greencastle				
1981	Holli Dennis	Fort Wayne		1st Runner-Up		
Miss Indiana World
1980	Julie Like					
1979	Lisa Amsbury					
1978	Lee Ann Miller					
1977	Renee Dian Roman					
1976	Elaine Fairfield					
1975	Julie Jo Clifford	Edwardsport		1st Runner-Up		Previously Miss Indiana USA 1972 and competed in Miss USA 1972.
1974	Jo Ellen Berryman	Kokomo				Later Miss Indiana USA 1975 and Top 12 semi-finalist at Miss USA 1975.
1973	Marjorie Wallace	Indianapolis	19	Miss World USA 1973 (resigned)		Wallace won Miss World 1973 and thus resigned the Miss World USA title. She later was dethroned/fired as Miss World for not fulfilling of her duties of the job.
1972	did not compete					
1971	Claudette Booth					
1970	Constance Elaine Hanger			Withdrew		Withdrew from the competition after getting a virus in which she had to go home.
1969	Mary Jean Hamilton					
1968	did not compete					
1967	Linda Sue Britzke					
1966	Bonnie Barkley					
1965	Rebecca Ann Shaw					
1964	Linda Creek					Competed as Indiana
1964	Jacquelyn Forester	South Bend		Top 15		Competed as South Bend, Indiana
1963	Barbara Jean Eaglen					
1962	June Cochran	Indianapolis	19			Previously Miss Indiana USA 1960 and a contestant at Miss USA 1960. Later Playboy Playmate of the Year 1963
1961	did not compete					
1960	did not compete					
1959	No known representatives from Indiana in 1958 & 1959.					
1958	No known representatives from Indiana in 1958 & 1959.					
Miss Indiana USA 1953-1957
1957	Pat Dorsett					
1956	Beverly Mattox					
1955	Mary Wasick					
1954	Cecilia Ann Dennis	Milan		Top 21		
1953	Edith Mae Krumme					
Miss Indiana World
1952	No known representatives from Indiana in 1951 & 1952.					
1951	No known representatives from Indiana in 1951 & 1952.					

Notes to table
