= Miss Arizona World =

Beauty pageant

- Formation: 1951
- Type: Beauty pageant
- Location: Arizona
- Members: Miss World America (1951–present)
- Official language: English
- Website: Official website

The Miss Arizona World competition is a beauty pageant that selects the representative for Arizona in the Miss World America pageant.

== Gallery of titleholders ==
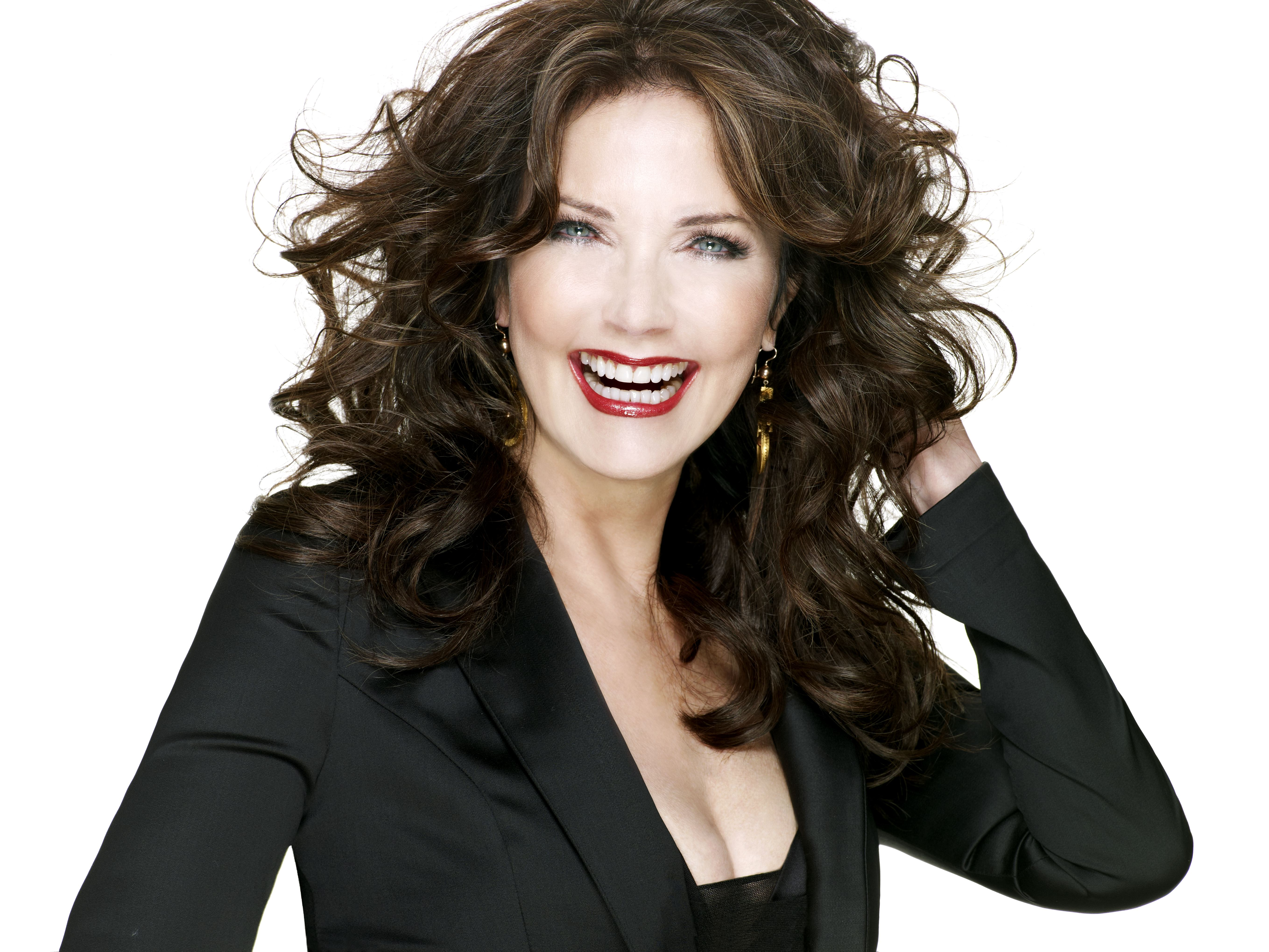
Lynda Jean Córdoba Carter, Miss Arizona World 1972 and Miss World USA 1972

== Winners ==
Color key

- Declared as Winner/Ended as Miss World America
- Ended as runner-up
- Ended as one of the finalists or semifinalists
- Ended as special awards winner
- Ended as Miss USA

Year	Name	Hometown	Age (Note: Age at the time of the Miss World America pageant)	Placement at Miss World America	Special awards at Miss World America	Notes
2020	Annie Zijia Li	New York City, NY		TBD	TBD	
2019	Elisabeth Bradley	Tulsa, OK	25	Top 10	Talent	
2018	did not compete					
2017	Maureen Ann Montagne	Chandler	23	1st Runner-Up		Previously Mutya Arizona 2013 and 1st Runner-Up at Mutya ng Pilipinas 2013. Previously Miss Arizona USA 2015 and Top 15 semi-finalist at Miss USA 2015. Later competed in Miss World Philippines 2018 and became Miss Eco Philippines 2018, representing Batangas and 1st Runner-Up at Miss Eco International 2019, representing Philippines.
2017	Ariyanna Zoe Norman	Tempe	26			
2017	Kayleen Workman	Chandler	26	Withdrew		
2016	did not compete					
2015	Victoria Mendoza	Phoenix	19	Miss World America 2015		Unplaced at Miss World 2015.
Miss Arizona United States 2014
2014	Savanna Troupe					
Miss Arizona World
2013	No titleholders as Miss World America was designated from 2006 to 2013.					
2012	No titleholders as Miss World America was designated from 2006 to 2013.					
2011	No titleholders as Miss World America was designated from 2006 to 2013.					
2010	No titleholders as Miss World America was designated from 2006 to 2013.					
2009	No titleholders as Miss World America was designated from 2006 to 2013.					
2008	No titleholders as Miss World America was designated from 2006 to 2013.					
2007	No titleholders as Miss World America was designated from 2006 to 2013.					
2006	No titleholders as Miss World America was designated from 2006 to 2013.					
2005	No known representatives from Arizona from 2003 to 2005.					
2004	No known representatives from Arizona from 2003 to 2005.					
2003	No known representatives from Arizona from 2003 to 2005.					
2002	No titleholders as Miss World America was designated from 1995 to 2002.					
2001	No titleholders as Miss World America was designated from 1995 to 2002.					
2000	No titleholders as Miss World America was designated from 1995 to 2002.					
1999	No titleholders as Miss World America was designated from 1995 to 2002.					
1998	No titleholders as Miss World America was designated from 1995 to 2002.					
1997	No titleholders as Miss World America was designated from 1995 to 2002.					
1996	No titleholders as Miss World America was designated from 1995 to 2002.					
1995	No titleholders as Miss World America was designated from 1995 to 2002.					
1994	did not compete					
1993	Shannessy Hakola					
1992	Maricarroll Verlinde					Previously Miss Arizona USA 1991 and Top 11 semifinalist at Miss USA 1991. Also won the Best State Costume Award at Miss USA.
Miss Arizona USA 1981-1991
1991	Maricarroll Verlinde			Top 11	Best State Costume	Later Miss Arizona World 1992 and competed in Miss World America 1992.
1990	Lezlie Leonard					
1989	LeeAnne Locken	Apache Junction		Top 10		
1988	Kris Keim	Scottsdale	22			Previously Miss Arizona Teen USA 1983
1987	Diane Martin	Phoenix	24	2nd runner-up		Previously Miss Arizona 1985
1986	Jodi Armstrong	Phoenix				
1985	Michelle Ducote	Tempe	20	Top 10	Best State Costume	
1984	Daria Sparling	Tucson	19		Best State Costume	
1983	Sindy Hedden	Tucson	23			
1982	Lori Hakola	Tucson				
1981	Cassie Hill	Phoenix				
Miss Arizona World
1980	Liz Van Houten					
1979	Debbie Jo Nix					
1978	Karen Filipi					
1977	Linda Mauldin					
1976	Cynthia Mathewson			4th Runner-Up		
1975	Crickett Jones					
1974	Sherry Love			3rd Runner-Up		
1973	Carol J. Dawson			4th Runner-Up		
1972	Lynda Jean Córdoba Carter	Tempe	21	Miss World USA 1972		Top 15 semi-finalist at Miss World 1972. Best known for playing Diana Prince/Wonder Woman in the 1970s TV Show Wonder Woman.
1971	Lindsay Diane Bloom	Scottsdale	21	2nd Runner-Up		Later Miss American Beauty 1972 (Miss U.S. International 1972) and 4th Runner-Up at Miss International 1972, representing USA.
1970	Jolene Johnson					
1969	Donna Kay Smith			Top 15		
1968	did not compete					
1967	Gigi Dahl			3rd Runner-Up		
1966	did not compete					
1965	Martha Ruth Thomas				Miss Congeniality	
1964	Sharee Sims					
1963	did not compete					
1962	did not compete					
1961	did not compete					
1960	did not compete					
1959	No known representatives from Arizona in 1958 & 1959.					
1958	No known representatives from Arizona in 1958 & 1959.					
Miss Arizona USA 1953-1957
1957	did not compete					
1956	Maija Bertulson					
1955	Patti Marks					
1954	Bonnie Omadee Johnson					
1953	Eleanor Ruth Cross					
Miss Arizona World
1952	No known representatives from the Arizona in 1951 & 1952.					
1951	No known representatives from the Arizona in 1951 & 1952.					

Notes to table
