= Miss Arizona (disambiguation) =

Miss Arizona is a competition to select the representative for the state of Arizona in the Miss America pageant.

Miss Arizona may also refer to:

== Pageant competitions ==
- Miss Arizona USA, a competition to select the representative for the state of Arizona in the Miss USA pageant
- Miss Arizona World, a competition to select the representative for the state of Arizona in the Miss World America pageant
- Miss Arizona Teen USA, a competition to select the representative for the state of Arizona in the Miss Teen USA pageant
- Miss Arizona's Outstanding Teen, a competition to select the representative for the state of Arizona in the Miss America's Teen pageant

== Films ==
- Miss Arizona (1919 film), a western silent film
- Miss Arizona (1988 film), a Hungarian drama film
- Miss Arizona (2018 film), an American comedy film starring Johanna Braddy
