= Abigail McCary =

American model

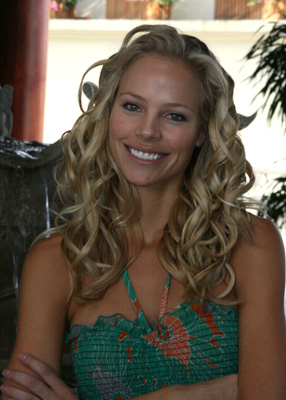
- Abigail McCary during Miss World
- Born: Abigail McCary; 1982 (age 43–44); Minneapolis, Minnesota, United States

Abigail McCary (born 1982) is an American model and beauty pageant titleholder who was appointed as Miss World America 2007 and represented her country at Miss World 2007 where she placed Top 15.

Preceded by Brooke Angus	Miss World United States; 2007	Succeeded by Lane Lindell
