= Elizabeth Safrit =

American beauty pageant titleholder (born 1992)

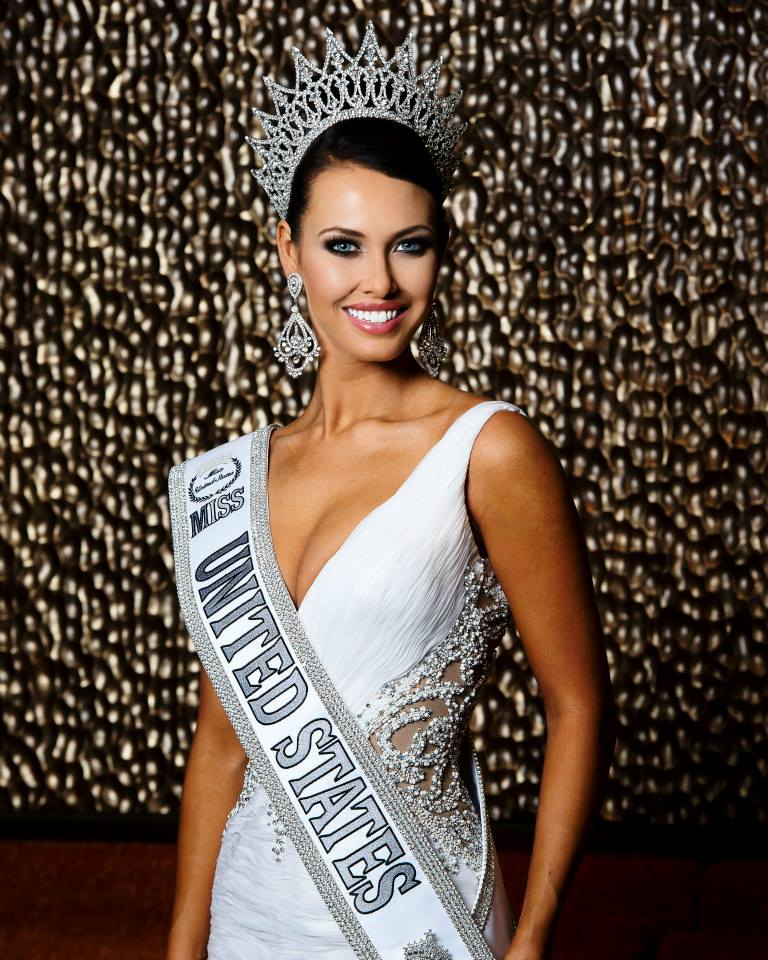
- Born: Elizabeth Safrit Scott; 27 May 1992 (age 34); Kannapolis, North Carolina, United States
- Education: University of South Carolina
- Occupations: Model; beauty pageant titleholder
- Height: 1.75 m (5 ft 9 in)
- Spouse: Charlie Bull (m. 2019)
- Beauty pageant titleholder
- Title: Miss North Carolina State 2014; Miss United States 2014; Miss World Americas 2014
- Hair color: Black
- Eye color: Blue
- Major competitions: Miss United States 2014 (Winner); Miss World 2014 (2nd Runner-Up) (Miss World Americas)

Elizabeth Safrit Bull (née Scott; born May 27, 1992) is an American model and beauty pageant titleholder who was crowned Miss United States 2014. She then represented her country at Miss World 2014 pageant held in London, England, where she placed 2nd Runner-Up and received the continental title of Miss World Americas, as well as winning the Multimedia fast-track event.

Safrit holds a degree in political science from the University of South Carolina and a master's degree from Georgetown University. In 2017, Safrit became the National Director of the United States franchise for the Miss World competition. In 2019, she married Charlie Bull in Lake Nona, Florida.

Awards and achievements
Preceded by Olivia Jordan (Oklahoma)	Miss World America; 2014	Succeeded by Victoria Mendoza (Arizona)
