= Lane Lindell =

American model (born 1990)

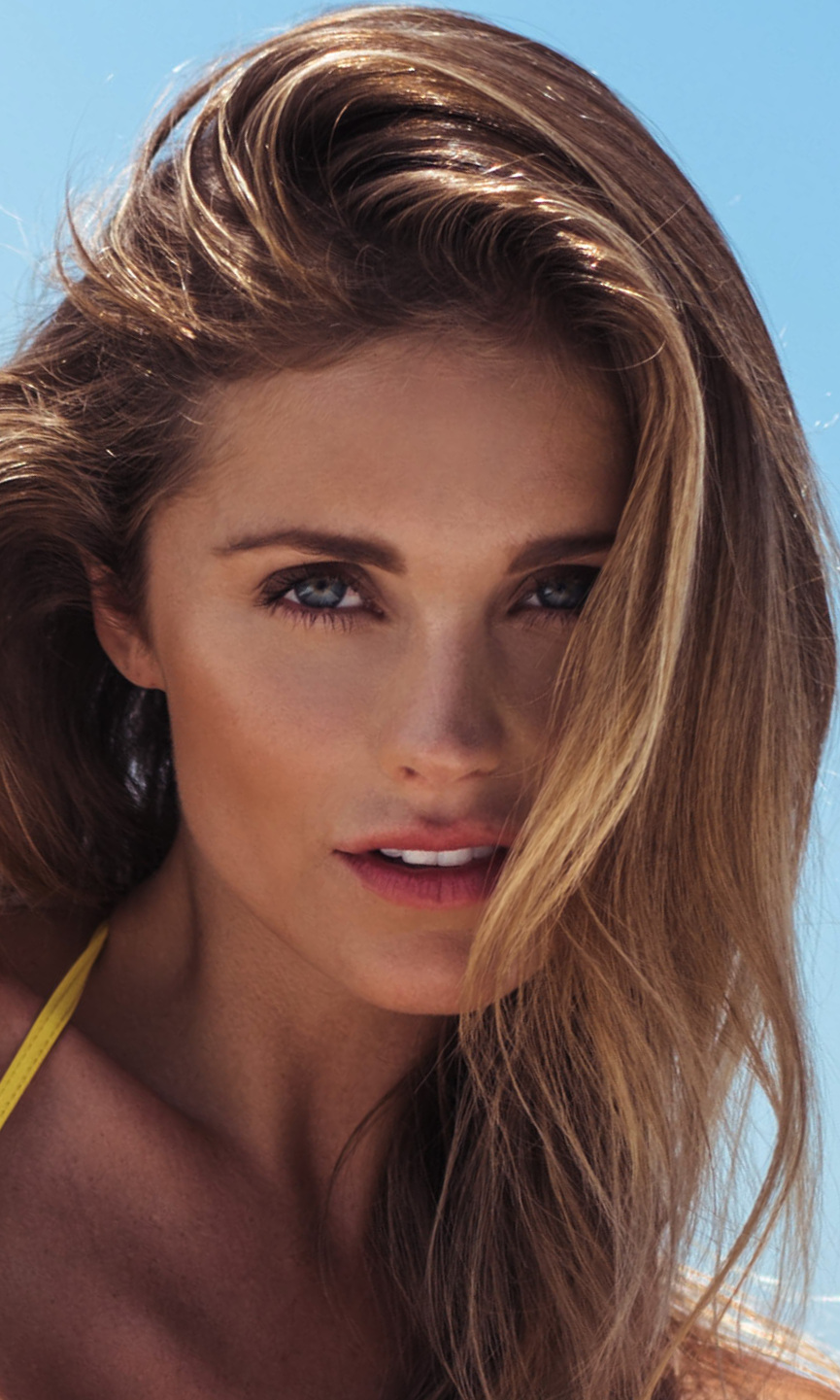
- Born: July 4, 1990 (age 35)

Lane Lindell Conrad, (born July 4, 1990) from Tampa, Florida, is an American fashion model and beauty pageant titleholder. Lindell, born July 4, 1990 and appointed as Miss World United States 2008. As a model she has worked for Abercrombie and Fitch, Neiman Marcus, Nordstrom, Shopbop, and Gucci. She represented the United States in Miss World 2008 in Johannesburg, South Africa, on December 13; where she was a semi-finalist and won the evening gown competition. She earned her B.A. degree from the Grady School of Journalism at the University of Georgia and is a member of Kappa Delta sorority. She graduated from H.B. Plant High School.

Preceded by Abigail McCary	Miss World United States; 2008	Succeeded by Lisa-Marie Kohrs
