= Carrie Stroup =

American TV host, fashion model and beauty pageant titleholder

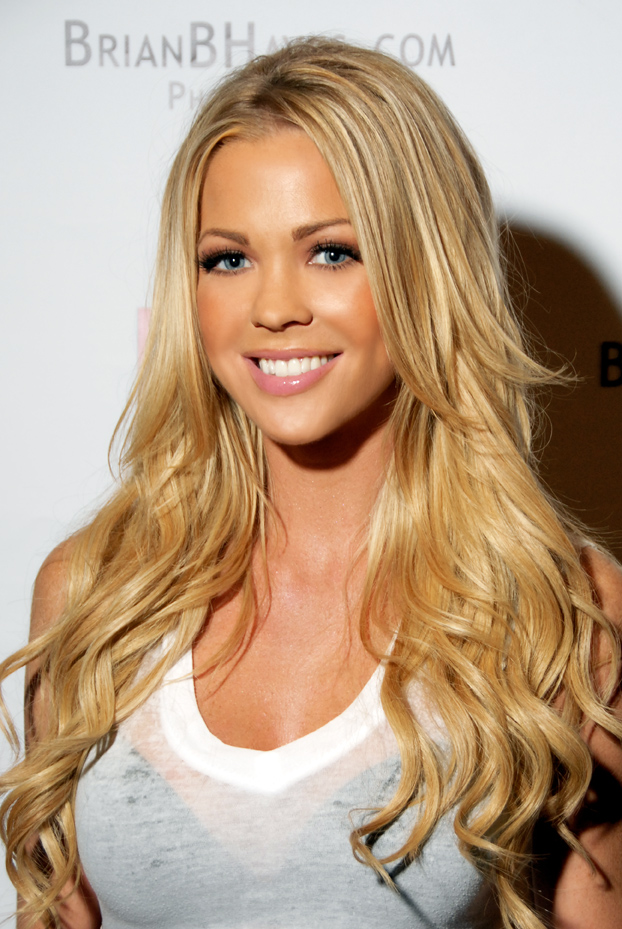
- Carrie Stroup attending the 2010 SNI Swimsuit Calendar Launch Party at Wonderland, Hollywood, CA on October 23, 2009
- Born: Carrie Ann Stroup; May 23, 1982 (age 44); Fort Lauderdale, Florida, U.S.
- Beauty pageant titleholder
- Title: Miss World America 2001
- Hair color: Blonde
- Eye color: Blue
- Major competition: Miss World 2001

Carrie Ann Stroup (born May 23, 1982, in Fort Lauderdale, Florida) is an American TV host, fashion model and beauty pageant titleholder who was crowned Miss World America 2001 and represented her country in Miss World 2001 but unplaced.

== Early life ==
The daughter of Joe and Debbie Stroup of Cashiers, North Carolina, Stroup had previously held the title of Miss United States Teen 1998.

== Miss United States World ==
Stroup is a 2000 graduate of Smoky Mountain High School in Sylva, North Carolina. She competed in Orlando, Florida for the title of Miss United States World in July 2001, capturing the crown and the right to participate in Miss World 2001.

As the official representative of her country to the Miss World 2001 pageant held in Sun City, South Africa on November 16, she became a bookies' favorite and competed against 93 delegates for the title eventually won by Agbani Darego of Nigeria.

== Life after Miss United States World ==
Stroup is a model featured in advertisements for PlayersOnly, an online gambling site, and a senior reporter at Gambling911. She also had a guest role in NBC's Scrubs.

Awards and achievements
Preceded by Angelique Breaux	Miss World America; 2001	Succeeded by Rebekah Revels
