= Gail Renshaw =

American winner of Miss World USA

Gail Renshaw (born c. 1947) is an American beauty pageant titleholder.

She was a teen model and by 22 was competing in national pageants. Her first marriage ended in divorce.

She won Miss World USA 1969. Renshaw was 1st runner-up at the 1969 Miss World competition. After the pageant, she resigned her title in order to get married, and was replaced by the runner-up in the USA contest, Connie Haggard from Texas. Gail graduated from Washington-Lee High School in Arlington, Virginia in 1965.

She was briefly engaged to Dean Martin. Later her name was Gail Renshaw Blackwell. She studied and became a registered nurse, specializing in dialysis.
