= Miss World America =

Beauty pageant contenders

- Formation: 1951; 75 years ago
- Type: Beauty pageant
- Headquarters: Seattle
- Location: United States
- Members: Miss World
- Official language: English
- National Director: Ekta Saini and Sanjay Saini
- Website: Miss World America Official Website

The United States has continuously sent a representative to Miss World since its inception in 1951. The United States has won the Miss World crown three times in 1973, 1990 and 2010. Currently, Miss World America is the official national pageant that selects the contestant from the United States to Miss World.

The current Miss World America is Jade Glab of New Jersey, who was crowned on July 12, 2026, in Seattle. Although Glab was originally expected to represent the United States at Miss World 2026 in Vietnam, the organization later announced that first runner-up Mary Sickler of New York state would represent the United States instead, while Glab is scheduled to compete at Miss World 2027 in Tanzania.

== History ==
During the mid-1950s, the Miss Universe organization sent delegates from the Miss USA system to compete at Miss World (1953–57). Alfred Patricelli of Bridgeport, Connecticut, was the executive director of the Miss World USA during its existence from 1958 to 1977. From 1958 to 1961, the winner of Miss United States competed at Miss World. Then from 1962 to 1966 Alfred Patricelli organized the Miss USA World pageant annually. In 1967, the pageant was renamed Miss World USA and was held every year until 1977. During this time, Miss World USA 1969 Gail Renshaw was the first person to resign from the title of "Miss World USA" after competing in Miss World 1969 in order to get married. Also in 1973, Marjorie Wallace won the Miss World title and became the first American woman to win the Miss World title. Between 1978 through 1980, BBS Productions, Inc., based in New York City, was given the franchise for the Miss World pageant where Griff O'Neil was the organizer, during this time the pageant was named "Miss World America".

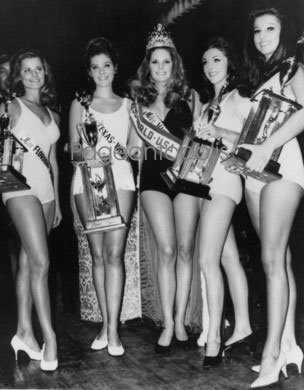
Miss World USA 1969

From 1981 to 1991, the Miss Universe organization were the license holders, and the American representative to Miss World ended up being the 1st runner-up of the Miss USA pageant. The Miss World Organization however wanted a public announcement during the finals of the Miss USA pageant that the 1st Runner-up would be going to Miss World, but they refused to do so. Therefore, after 1991 the Miss World Organization did not accept any more Miss USA 1st Runners-up.

From 1992 to 1997, Richard Guy and Rex Holt (GuyRex) were the national directors of Miss World in the United States and organized the Miss World America pageant in 1992, 1993, and 1994. They discontinued the pageant in 1995 but handpicked a representative from 1995 to 1997. In 1998, Hirsh Wilck succeeded GuyRex and became the license holder and sent contestants from 1998 to 2000.

In 2001, the Miss World organization asked Pageantry Magazine to choose a contestant for Miss World 2001 since they did not have a license holder during this year. In 2002, Jean Renard and Miss World Holdings Inc became license holders and handpicked the representative. They dropped the license afterwards due to legal issues with Rebekah Revels, whom they had handpicked to compete in 2002. In 2003, Bruce Vermeulen and Geoff Kearney founded the US Miss World organization. They chose the 2003 representative by mail-in entry and telephone interviews and in 2004 held the US Miss World pageant. In 2005, Barbizon Modeling became the license holders and organized the US Miss World pageant in San Francisco, California.

From 2007 to 2011, Elite Models were the license holders for Miss World in the United States and they handpicked the representative from their list of models. During this time, it was common to know who was going to represent the United States in Miss World a week or two before the international pageant began. Among their designee was Alexandria Mills who in 2010 became one of the few Miss World winners to have won the international pageant without winning a national pageant. In 2012–2013, Lisa-Marie Kohrs, former 2009 U.S. Representative were the national director and she handpicked from the contestants who had the charity background. It is unknown who was in charge of selecting the contestants in 1951, 1952, and 2006. In 2013,

In 2014, in an effort from Julia Morley who wanted all national directors to hold a national pageant to select the representative of their country as opposed to only designate, Christopher Wilmer, the organizer of the Miss United States pageant, was appointed as the national director of Miss World in the United States. As a result, the winner of Miss United States 2014, Elizabeth Safrit, was selected to compete at Miss World because she met the age requirements of the international pageant. In 2015, Wilmer reinstated the Miss World America pageant in order to properly reflect Miss World's age and contest requirements. Miss World America was held in 2015 and 2016.

In 2017, Lynne Scott Safrit and her daughter Elizabeth Safrit, became co-national directors of Miss World in the United States and created 'America's Miss World' and Miss Teen World America.

In 2018, Michael Blakey became the national director of Miss World in the United States with assistance from Liz Fuller. The pageant went back to being named 'Miss World America'. In December 2021, Miss World America 2018 (and then Miss Earth USA 2021), Marisa Butler, and Miss World America 2020, Alissa Andereg, along with several other former state titleholders, interviewed with Jezebel describing their time with the Miss World America organization as 'disrespectful' and 'predatory.'

In 2023, Michael Blakey lost the license to Miss World and Ekta and Sanjay Saini, the parents of Miss World America 2021, Shree Saini, became the new national directors of Miss World America.

== Results summary ==
=== Placements in Miss World ===
United States holds a record of 52 placements at Miss World, being placed first overall.

- Miss World: Marjorie Wallace (Miss World 1973), Gina Tolleson (Miss World 1990), Alexandria Mills (Miss World 2010)
- 1st Runners-up: Karin Hultman (1954), Margaret Haywood (1955), Betty Cherry (1956), Dianna Batts (1965), Gail Renshaw (1969), Shree Saini (2021)
- 2nd Runners-up: Brenda Denton (1985), Nancy Randall (2004), Elizabeth Safrit (2014)
- 4th Runners-up: Mary Griffin (1953), Judith Achter (1960), Terry Browning (1974), Cindy Miller (1977)
- Top 5: Jill Scheffert (1989)
- Top 7/8: Jo Ann Odum (1961), Amedee Chabot (1962), Denice Blair (1966), Brucene Smith (1971), Brooke Alexander (1980), Lisa Moss (1981), LuAnn Caughey (1982), Lisa Allred (1983), Kelly Anderson (1984), Halle Berry (1985)
- Top 10/11: Diana Magaña (1988), Charlotte Ray (1991), Sharon Belden (1992), Maribeth Brown (1993), Sallie Toussaint (1997), Shauna Gambill (1998), Natasha Allas (1999), Angelique Breaux (2000), Rebekah Revels (2002), Audra Mari (2016)
- Top 14/15/16: Michele Metrinko (1963), Jeanne Quinn (1964), Pamela Pall (1967), Sandra Wolsfeld (1970), Lynda Carter (1972), Debra Freeze (1978), Carter Wilson (1979), Abigail McCary (2007), Claudine Book (2012)
- Top 20: Olivia Jordan (2013), Athenna Crosby (2025), Mary Sickler (2026)
- Top 30/40: Clarissa Bowers (2017), Marisa Butler (2018), Emmy Cuvelier (2019)

=== Awards ===
- Miss World Americas: Brenda Denton (1985), Gina Tolleson (1990), Sallie Toussaint (1997), Alexandria Mills (2010), Elizabeth Safrit (2014), Audra Mari (2016), Shree Saini (2021)
- Miss World Dress Designer: Lane Lindell (2008), Victoria DiSorbo (2023)
- Miss World Sports: Abigail McCary (2007), Marisa Butler (2018)
- Beauty with a Purpose: Shree Saini (2021)
- Miss World Multimedia: Elizabeth Safrit (2014)
- Miss World Beach Beauty: Nancy Randall (2004)
- Miss World Talent: Rebekah Revels (2002)
- Miss Personality: Cloe Cabrera (1987)

== Titleholders ==
This is a list of women who have represented the United States at the Miss World pageant:

Color key

- Declared as Winner
- Ended as Runner-up
- Ended as one of the Finalists, Semi-finalists or Quarter-finalists

Year	Name	Age (Note: Ages when crowned the national title.)	State Represented	Hometown	Placement at Miss World	Notes
1951	Annette Gibson	20	Kentucky	Louisville		
1952	Tally Richards†	24	New York	New York City		
1953	Mary Kemp Griffin†	23	South Carolina	Florence	4th Runner-up	Miss South Carolina 1952, Top 10 at Miss America 1953; Miss Myrtle Beach USA 1953, 1st Runner-up at Miss USA 1953.
1954	Karin Hultman	22	New York	Rochester	1st Runner-up	Miss New York USA 1954, 1st Runner-up at Miss USA 1954 (Originally 2nd Runner-up, later elevated after original 1st runner-up was disqualified).
1955	Margaret Anne Haywood†	19	Arkansas	Jonesboro	1st Runner-up	Miss Arkansas USA 1955, 1st Runner-up at Miss USA 1955.
1956	Betty Lane Cherry	20	South Carolina	Orangeburg	1st Runner-up	Miss South Carolina USA 1956, 1st Runner-up at Miss USA 1956.
1957	Charlotte Sheffield†	20	Utah	Salt Lake City		Miss Utah USA 1957, Miss USA 1957 (Originally 1st Runner-up, later took over after original winner was disqualified).
1958	Nancy Anne Corcoran	23	New York	New York City		
1959	Loretta Powell†	24	Connecticut	Bridgeport		
1960	Annette Driggers†	15	New York	Freeport	Did not compete	Driggers was disqualified because she was underaged.
1960	Judith Achter	18	Missouri	St. Louis	4th Runner-up	Originally 1st Runner-up, later took over after original winner was disqualified.
1961	Jo Ann Odum	19	West Virginia	Huntington	Top 7	
1962	Amedee Chabot	17	California	Los Angeles	Top 8	
1963	Michele Metrinko	18	New York	New York City	Top 14	Miss District of Columbia USA 1963, 1st Runner-up at Miss USA 1963.
1964	Jeanne Quinn	20	New York	East Meadow	Top 16	Miss New York USA 1963, Top 15 at Miss USA 1963; 1st Runner-up at Miss American Beauty 1964.
1965	Dianna Lynn Batts	19	District of Columbia	Falls Church, VA	1st Runner-up	Miss District of Columbia USA 1965, 4th Runner-up at Miss USA 1965.
1966	Denice Blair	19	Utah	Layton	Top 7	Miss Utah USA 1966, Top 15 at Miss USA 1966.
1967	Pamela Pall	20	California	Norwalk	Top 15	
1968	Johnine Avery	22	Washington	Los Angeles, CA		1st Runner-up at Miss World USA 1967.
1969	Gail Renshaw	22	Virginia	Arlington	1st Runner-up	Later resigned to get married.
1969	Connie Lee Haggard	18	Texas	Dallas	Did not compete	Originally 1st Runner-up, later took over after original winner resigned.
1970	Sandra Wolsfeld	24	Illinois	Wheaton	Top 15	Miss Illinois USA 1968.
1971	Brucene Smith	20	Texas	Port Lavaca	Top 7	Miss International USA 1974, Miss International 1974.
1972	Lynda Carter	21	Arizona	Tempe	Top 15	
1973	Marjorie Wallace	19	Indiana	Indianapolis	Miss World 1973	Later was dethroned from Miss World 1973 title, but never officially replaced by the runners-up.
1973	Lexie Brockway	19	Washington	Richland	Did not compete	Originally 1st Runner-up, later took over after original winner won Miss World title.
1974	Terry Ann Browning	20	Florida	Ormond Beach	4th Runner-up	
1975	Annelise Ilschenko	17	Ohio	Middleburg Heights		
1976	Kimberlee Foley	21	Michigan	Southfield		
1977	Cindy Miller	20	Virginia	Chesapeake	4th Runner-up	
1978	Debra Freeze	20	North Carolina	Mooresville	Top 15	
1979	Carter Wilson	23	Virginia	Harrisonburg	Top 15	
1980	Brooke Alexander	17	Hawaii	Kailua	Top 7	
1981	Holli Dennis	21	Indiana	Fort Wayne	Did not compete	Dennis planned to get married after Miss USA 1981 contest; Miss Indiana USA 1981, 1st Runner-up at Miss USA 1981.
1981	Lisa Moss	23	Louisiana	Shreveport	Top 7	Elevated to replace Dennis; Miss Louisiana USA 1981, 2nd Runner-up at Miss USA 1981.
1982	LuAnn Caughey	22	Texas	Abilene	Top 7	Miss Texas USA 1982, 1st Runner-up at Miss USA 1982.
1983	Lisa Allred	21	Texas	Fort Worth	Top 7	Miss Texas USA 1983, 1st Runner-up at Miss USA 1983.
1984	Kelly Anderson	23	West Virginia	Clarksburg	Top 7	Miss West Virginia 1982; Miss West Virginia USA 1984, 1st Runner-up at Miss USA 1984.
1985	Brenda Denton	21	New Mexico	Hobbs	2nd Runner-up	Miss World Americas; Miss New Mexico USA 1985, 1st Runner-up at Miss USA 1985.
1986	Halle Berry	19	Ohio	Oakwood	Top 7	Miss Ohio USA 1986, 1st Runner-up at Miss USA 1986.
1987	Clotilde "Cloe" Cabrera	22	Florida	Tampa		Miss Personality; Miss Florida USA 1987, 1st Runner-up at Miss USA 1987.
1988	Diana Magaña	22	California	Rancho Palos Verdes	Top 10	Miss California USA 1988, 1st Runner-up at Miss USA 1988.
1989	Jill Scheffert	20	Oklahoma	Oklahoma City	Top 5	Miss Oklahoma USA 1989, 1st Runner-up at Miss USA 1989.
1990	Gina Tolleson	20	South Carolina	Spartanburg	Miss World 1990	Miss World Americas; Miss South Carolina USA 1990, 1st Runner-up at Miss USA 1990.
1991	Charlotte Ray	24	New Jersey	Camden	Top 10	Miss New Jersey USA 1991, 1st Runner-up at Miss USA 1991.
1992	Sharon Belden	26	Florida	Coral Gables	Top 10	Miss Florida USA 1992.
1993	Maribeth Brown	23	Massachusetts	Holliston	Top 10	
1994	Kristie Harmon	20	Georgia	Conyers		Miss Georgia Teen USA 1992.
1995	Jill Ankuda	19	Texas	El Paso		
1996	Kelly Webber	20	Texas	El Paso		
1997	Sallie Toussaint	23	New York	New York City	Top 10	Miss World Americas; Miss Connecticut USA 2000.
1998	Shauna Gambill	22	California	Los Angeles	Top 10	Miss California Teen USA 1994, Miss Teen USA 1994; Miss California USA 1998, 1st Runner-up at Miss USA 1998.
1999	Natasha Allas	25	California	Los Angeles	Top 10	Miss California Teen USA 1992, Top 6 at Miss Teen USA 1992.
2000	Angelique Breaux	22	California	Vista	Top 10	Miss California USA 1999, 2nd Runner-up at Miss USA 1999; 1st Runner-up at Miss World USA 1999.
2001	Carrie Ann Stroup	19	North Carolina	Cashiers		At first the organizer had chosen Stroup for Miss World 2001, but then she was replaced by Smith due to a contractual disagreement. After much confusion, Stroup was confirmed as the U.S. representative.
2001	Starla Smith	20	Alabama	Dothan	Did not compete	Replaced Stroup, but a couple months later Miss World organization didn't approve her; Miss Alabama Teen USA 1999.
2002	Rebekah Revels	24	North Carolina	St. Pauls	Top 10	Miss World Talent; Miss North Carolina 2002 (dethroned).
2003	Kimberly Harlan	19	Georgia	Marietta		Miss Georgia Teen USA 2002, 4th Runner-up at Miss Teen USA 2002.
2004	Nancy Randall	24	Illinois	Chicago	2nd Runner-up	Miss World Beach Beauty and Top 20 in Miss World Top Model; 1st Runner-up at Miss Earth United States 2006.
2005	Lisette Diaz	22	California	San Diego		
2006	Brooke Elizabeth Angus	24	Vermont	Essex		Top 20 in Miss World Dress Designer and Top 24 in Miss World Sports; Miss Vermont USA 2002.
2007	Abigail McCary	25	Minnesota	Minneapolis	Top 16	Miss World Sports.
2008	Lane Lindell	18	Florida	Tampa		Miss World Dress Designer, Top 25 in Miss World Beach Beauty and Top 32 in Miss World Top Model.
2009	Brittany Mason	23	Indiana	Anderson	Did not compete	Mason didn't compete for unknown reasons; Miss Indiana USA 2008, Top 10 in Miss USA 2008.
2009	Lisa-Marie Kohrs	22	California	Malibu		Top 20 in Miss World Beach Beauty.
2010	Alexandria Mills	18	Kentucky	Shepherdsville	Miss World 2010	Miss World Americas, 1st Runner-up in Miss World Beach Beauty and 2nd Runner-up in Miss World Top Model.
2011	Erin Cummins	19	Washington	Arlington		Top 36 in Miss World Beach Beauty.
2012	Jessica Dykstra	24	Florida	Miami	Did not compete	Dykstra didn't compete due to Elite Model Management lost the Miss World franchise.
2012	Claudine Book	20	California	Malibu	Top 15	2nd Runner-up in Beauty with a Purpose, Top 25 in Miss World Talent and Top 56 in Miss World Top Model.
2013	Olivia Jordan	24	Oklahoma	Tulsa	Top 20	1st Runner-up in Miss World Top Model; Miss Oklahoma USA 2015, Miss USA 2015, 2nd Runner-up at Miss Universe 2015.
2014	Elizabeth Safrit	22	North Carolina	Kannapolis	2nd Runner-up	Miss World Americas, Miss World Multimedia, Top 5 in Miss World Talent and Top 32 in Miss World Sports.
2015	Victoria Mendoza	19	Arizona	Phoenix		Top 25 in Beauty with a Purpose, Top 25 in Miss World People's Choice, Top 30 in Miss World Talent and Top 32 in Miss World Sports.
2016	Audra Mari	22	North Dakota	Fargo	Top 11	Miss World Americas, Top 24 in Beauty with a Purpose, Top 24 in Miss World Sports and Top 50 in Miss World People's Choice; Miss North Dakota Teen USA 2011, 1st Runner-up at Miss Teen USA 2011; Miss North Dakota USA 2014, 1st Runner-up at Miss USA 2014.
2017	Clarissa Bowers	19	Florida	Umatilla	Top 40	
2018	Marisa Butler	24	Maine	Standish	Top 30	Miss World Sports and Top 18 in Miss World Talent; Miss Maine USA 2016; Miss Earth USA 2021, 1st Runner-up at Miss Earth 2021.
2019	Emmy Rose Cuvelier	23	South Dakota	Collins, IA	Top 40	Top 27 in Miss World Talent and Top 32 in Miss World Sports.
2020	Alissa Anderegg	26	New York	New York City	No competition held due to the COVID-19 pandemic.	
2021	Shree Saini	25	Washington	Moses Lake	1st Runner-up	Miss World Americas, Beauty with a Purpose and Top 27 in Miss World Talent; Top 10 at Miss World America 2020.
2022	No competition held due to the delay of the 2021 pageant.					
2023	Victoria DiSorbo	25	Tennessee	Pembroke Pines, FL		Miss World Dress Designer (Americas and Caribbean) and Top 25 in Miss World Head-to-Head Challenge; Miss Florida Teen USA 2017.
2024	No competition held due to the delay of the 2023 pageant.					
2025	Athenna Crosby	26	California	San Jose	Top 20	Top 24 in Miss World Talent; Miss California Teen USA 2016, Top 15 at Miss Teen USA 2016; 1st Runner-up at Miss World America 2023.
2026	Mary Sickler	23	New York	Houston, TX	Top 20	Top 20 in Miss World Head-to-Head Challenge and Top 21 in Miss World Top Model; Originally 1st Runner-up, later elevated to replace Glab; Miss Nevada USA 2025, 4th Runner-up at Miss USA 2025.
2027	Jade Glab	25	New Jersey	Belmar	TBA	Miss World America 2026, later scheduled to compete in 2027; Miss New Jersey 2019, Top 15 at Miss America 2020, 2nd Runner-up at Miss World America 2023.

=== By number of states ===
States	Titles	Years
California	10	1962, 1967, 1988, 1998, 1999, 2000, 2005, 2009, 2012, 2025
New York	9	1952, 1954, 1958, 1960, (Note: Took over or held the title for a brief period of time after the original winner resigned or before they were dethroned, and thus did not compete at Miss World.) 1963, 1964, 1997, 2020, 2026
Florida	6	1974, 1987, 1992, 2008, 2012, 2017
Texas	6	1969, 1971, 1982, 1983, 1995, 1996
Washington	4	1968, 1973, 2011, 2021
North Carolina	4	1978, 2001, 2002, 2014
Indiana	3	1973, 1981, 2009
South Carolina	3	1953, 1956, 1990
Virginia	3	1969, 1977, 1979
New Jersey	2	1991, 2027
Arizona	2	1972, 2015
Oklahoma	2	1989, 2013
Kentucky	2	1951, 2010
Illinois	2	1970, 2004
Georgia	2	1994, 2003
Ohio	2	1975, 1986
West Virginia	2	1961, 1984
Utah	2	1957, 1966
Tennessee	1	2023
South Dakota	1	2019
Maine	1	2018
North Dakota	1	2016
1983	1	2007
Vermont	1	2006
Alabama	1	2001
Massachusetts	1	1993
New Mexico	1	1985
Louisiana	1	1981
Hawaii	1	1980
Michigan	1	1976
District of Columbia	1	1965
Missouri	1	1960
Connecticut	1	1959
Arkansas	1	1955

=== Winners' gallery ===
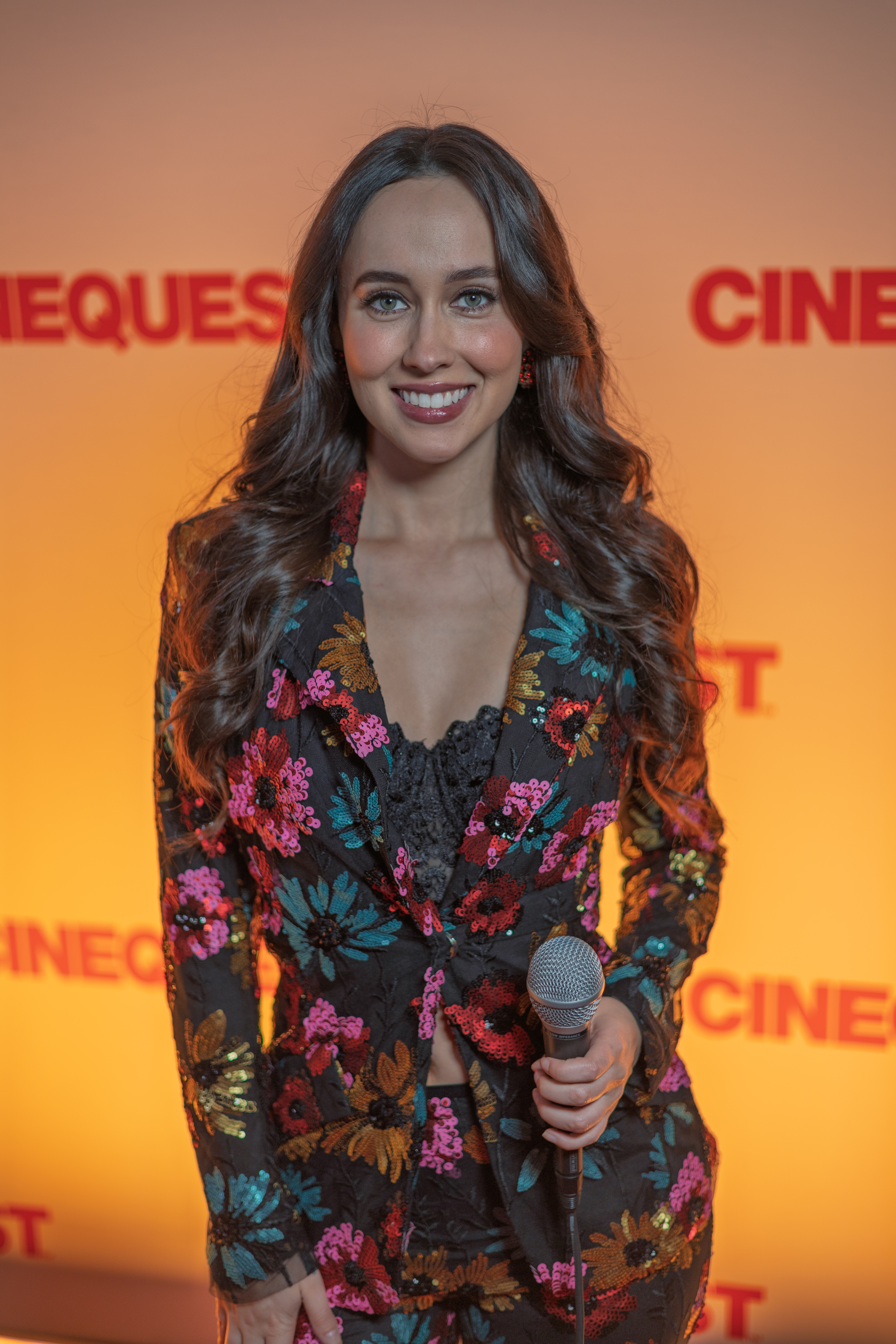
Miss World America 2025
Athenna Crosby

Miss World America 2021
Shree Saini

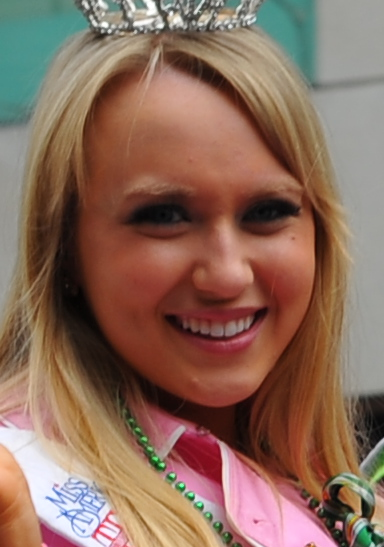
Miss World America 2020
Alissa Anderegg

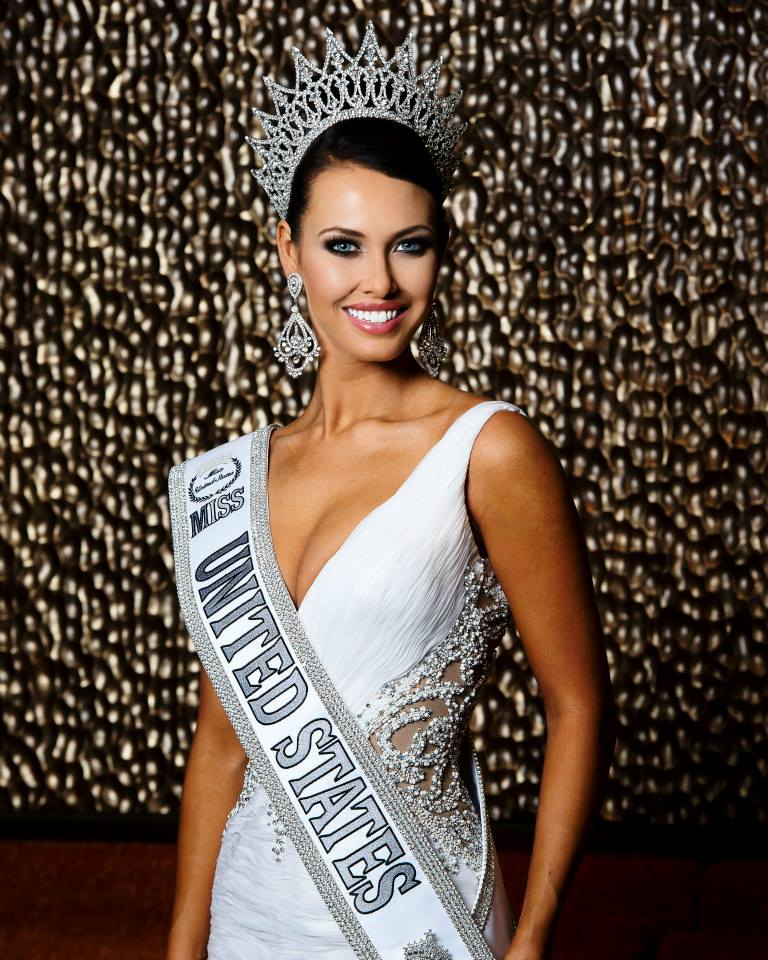
Miss United States 2014
Elizabeth Safrit

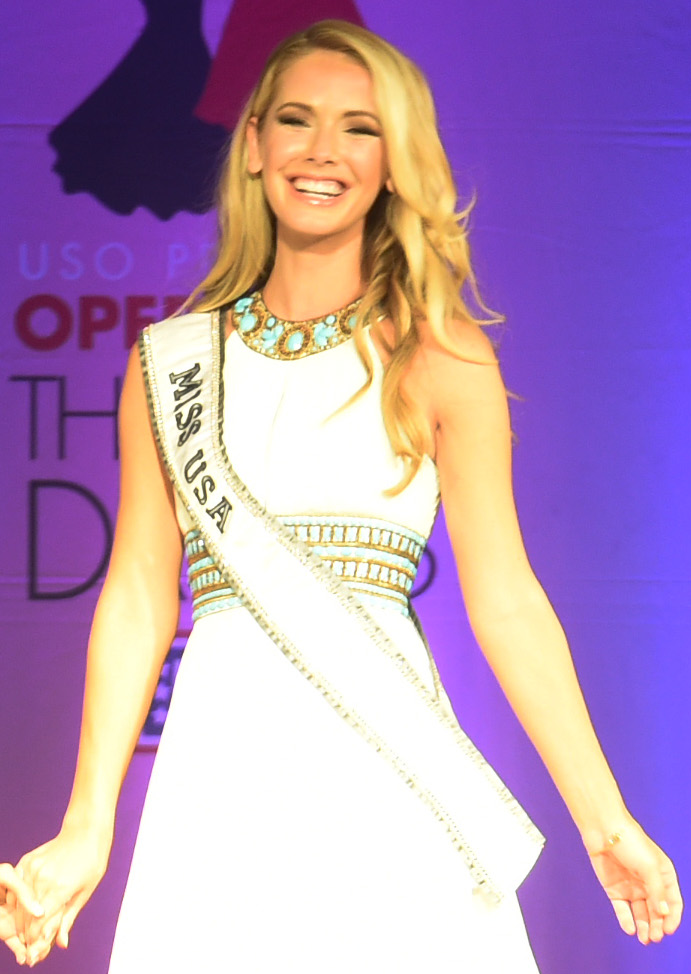
Miss World United States 2013 and Miss USA 2015
Olivia Jordan

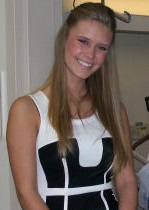
Miss World United States 2010 and Miss World 2010
Alexandria Mills

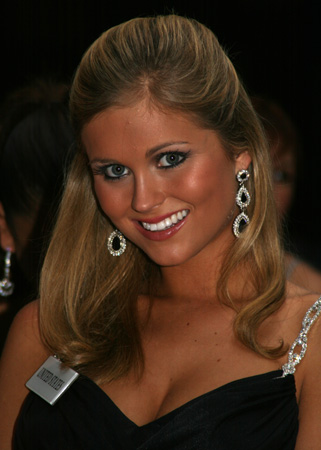
Miss World United States 2008
Lane Lindell

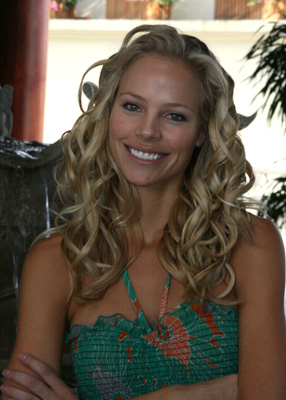
Miss World United States 2007
Abigail McCary

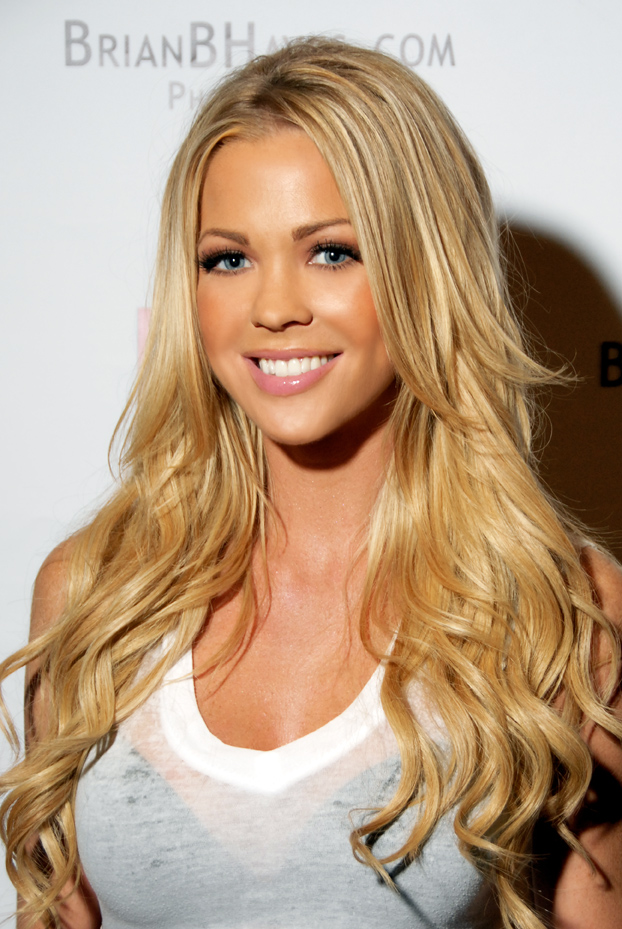
Miss World United States 2001
Carrie Ann Stroup

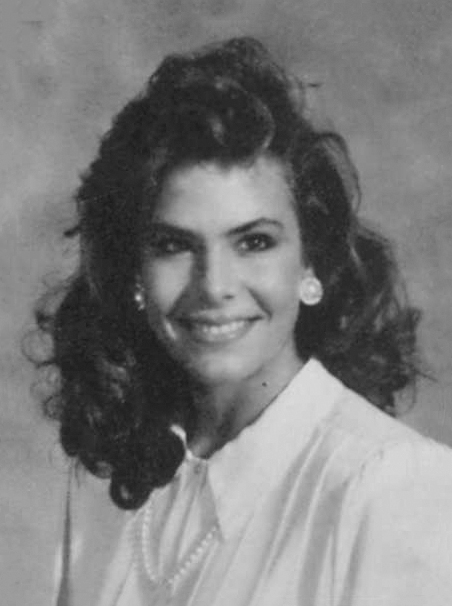
Miss World USA 1990 and Miss World 1990
Gina Tolleson

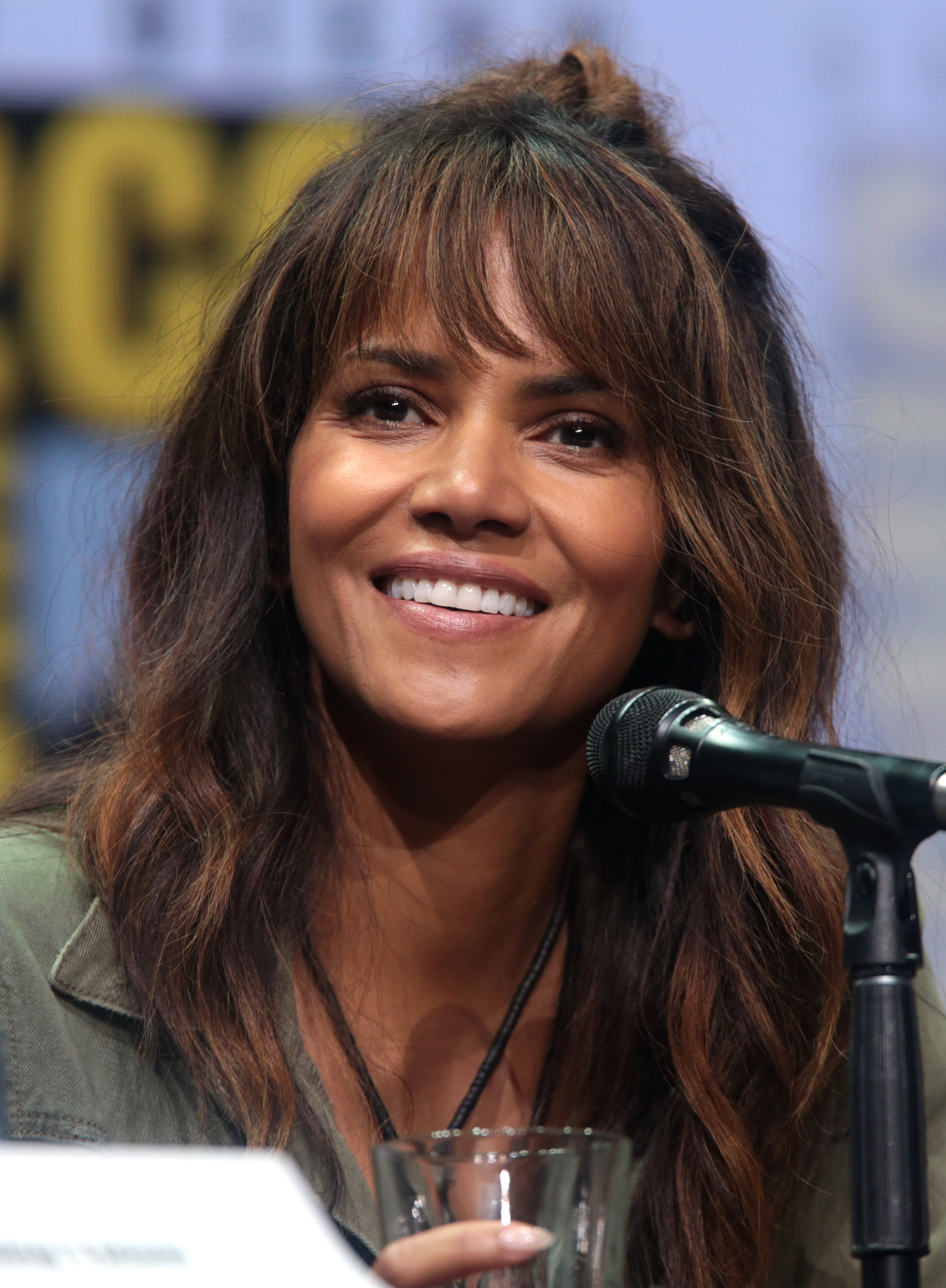
Miss World USA 1986
Halle Berry

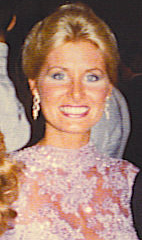
Miss World USA 1983
Lisa Allred

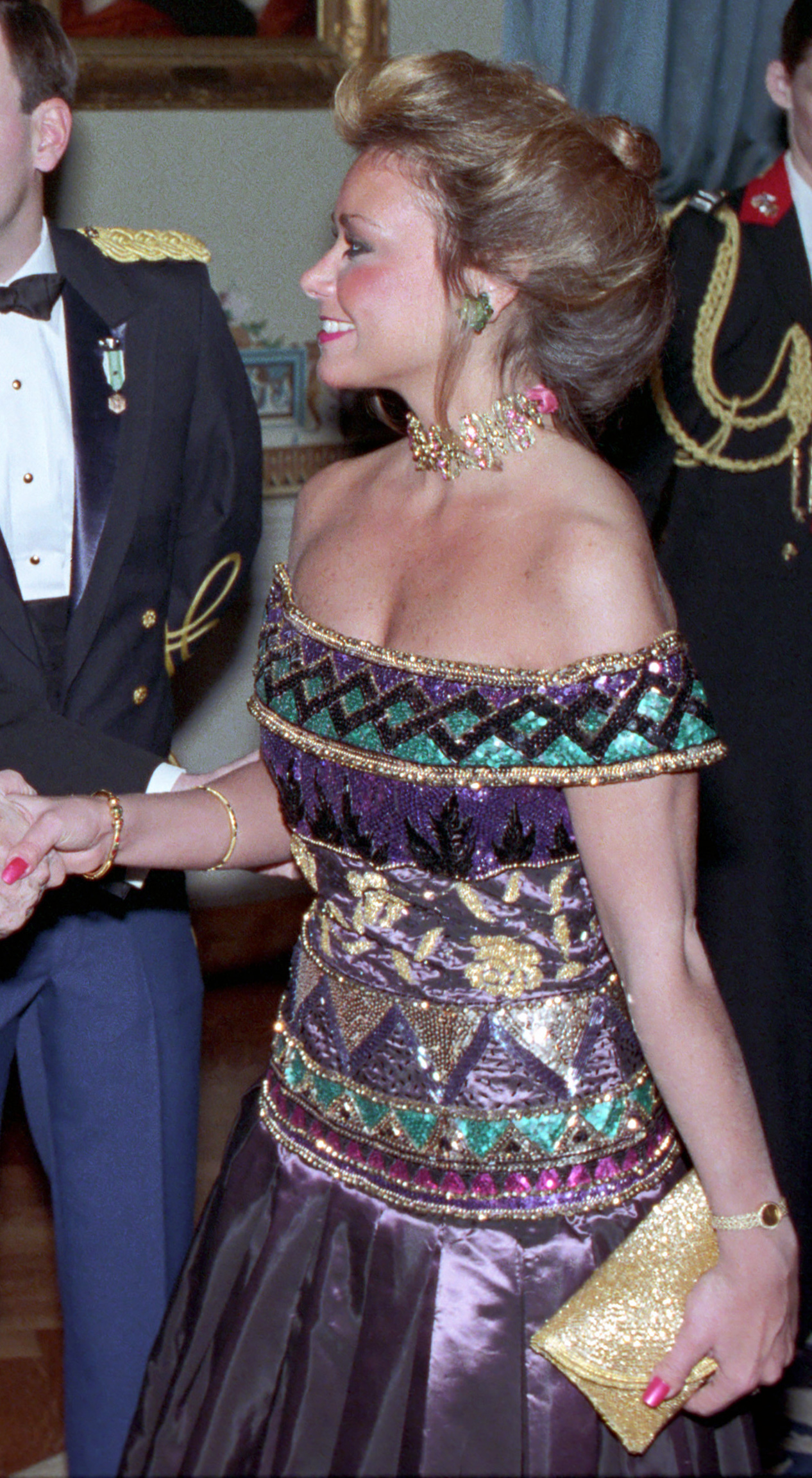
Miss World USA 1975
Annelise Ilschenko

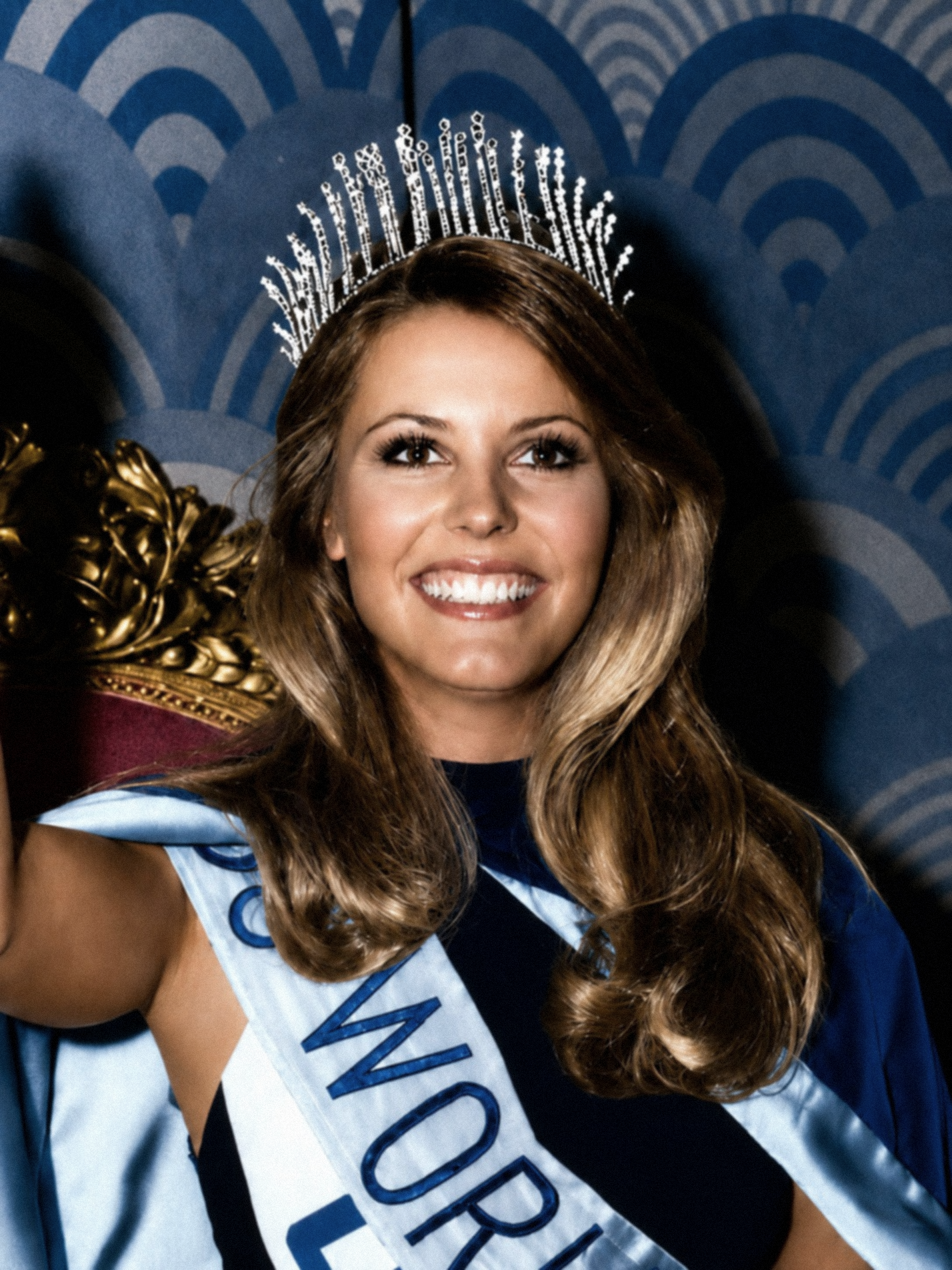
Miss World USA 1973
Marjorie Wallace

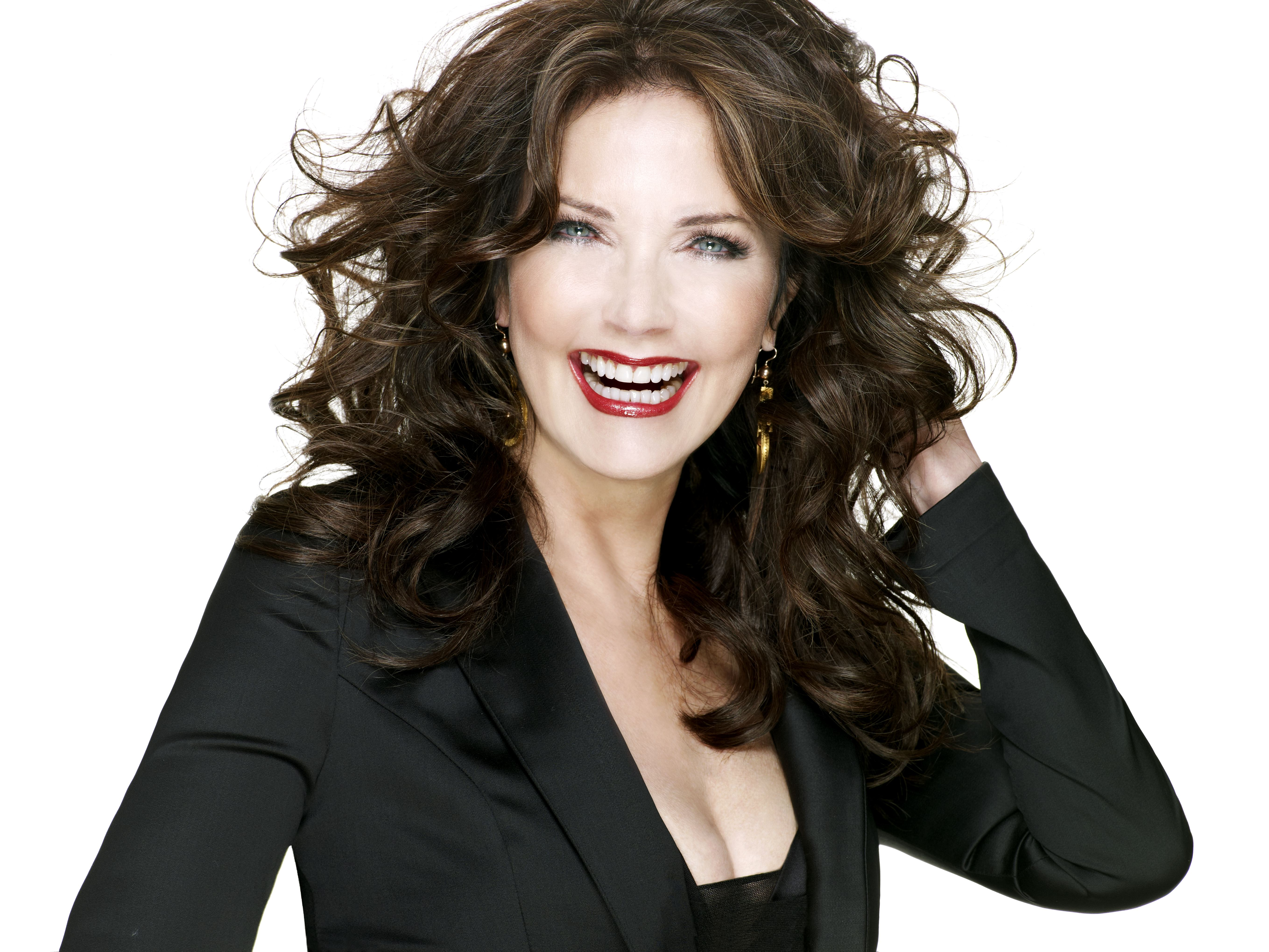
Miss World USA 1972
Lynda Carter

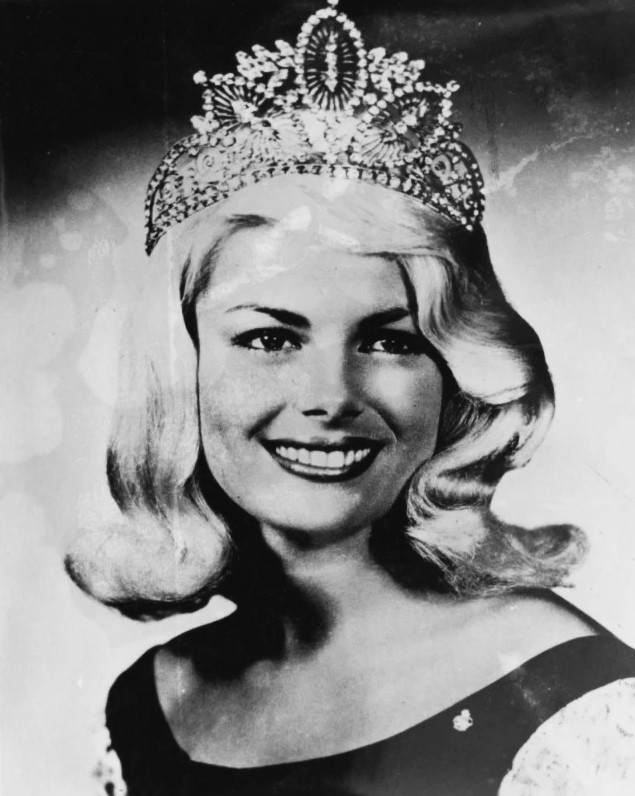
Miss USA World 1965
Diana Lynn Batts

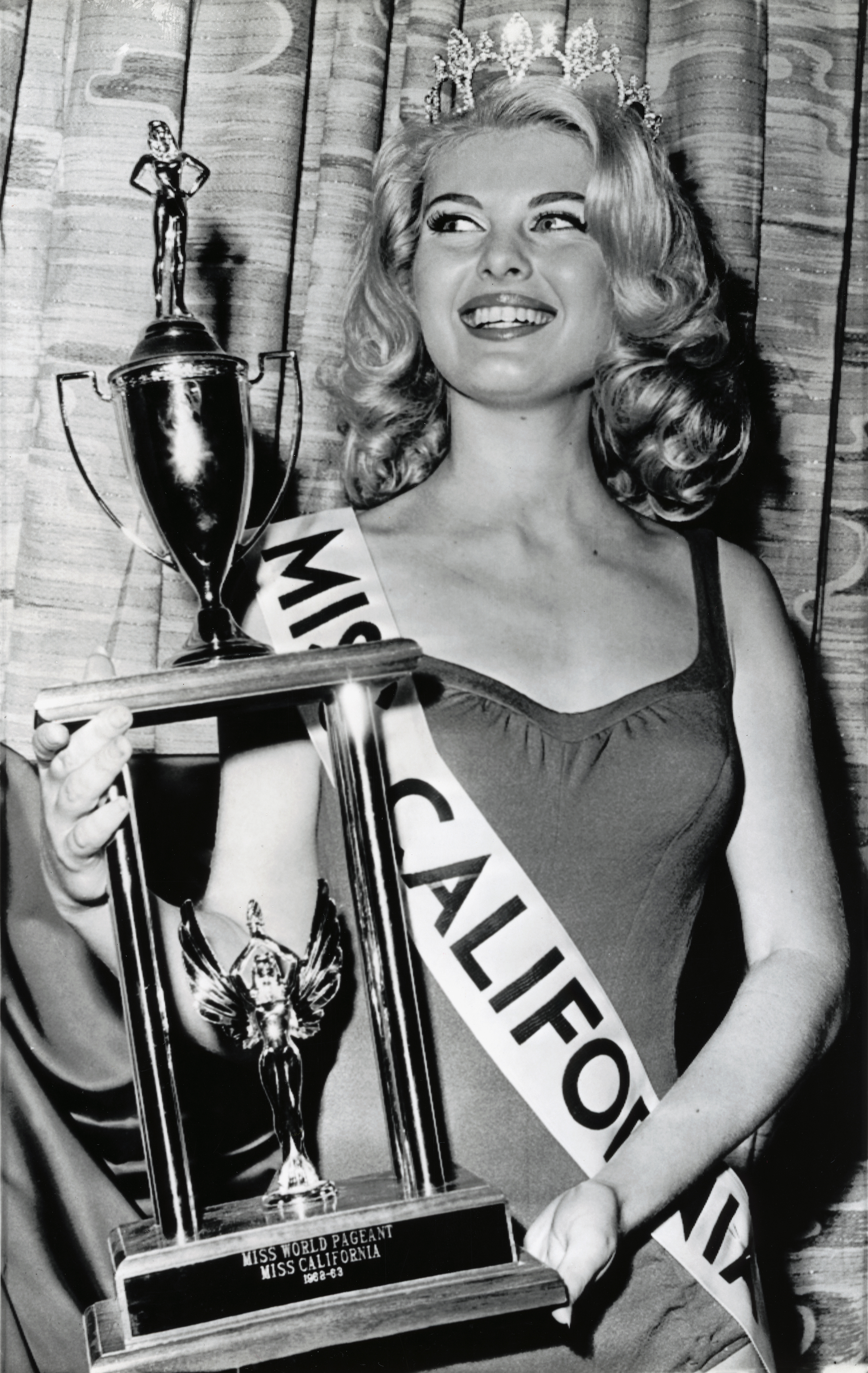
Miss USA World 1962
Amedee Chabot

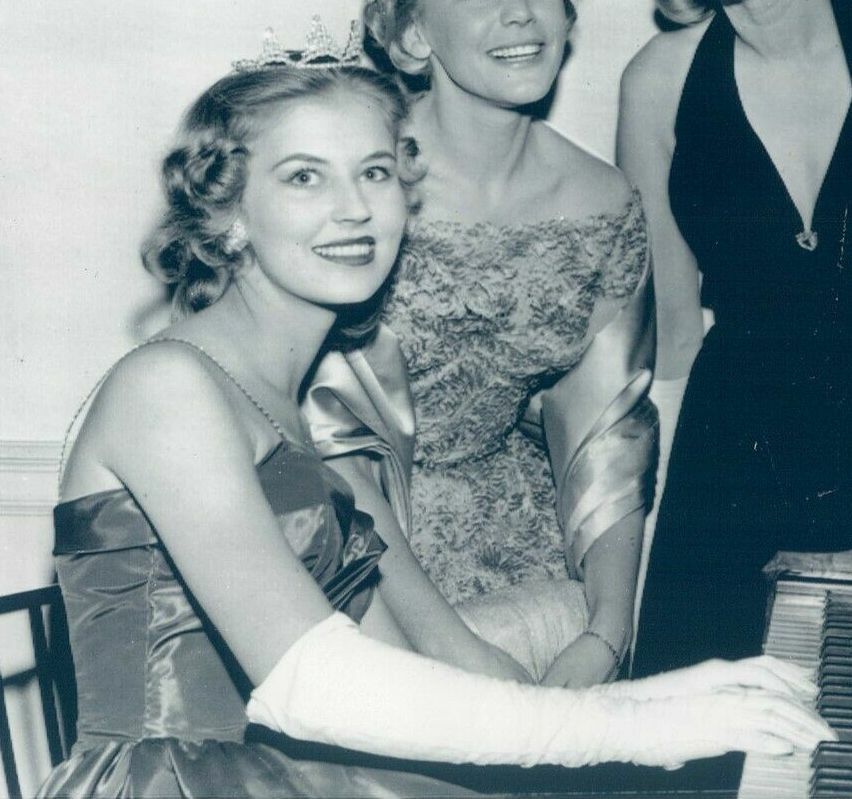
Miss USA 1957
Charlotte Sheffield
