= Miss United States 1961 =

- Date: August 26, 1961
- Venue: Carnegie Hall, New York City, New York
- Entrants: 33
- Placements: 5
- Winner: West Virginia

Miss United States 1961, also referred to as Miss World USA 1961, was the 4th edition of the Miss United States World pageant. It was held at Carnegie Hall in New York City, New York, and was won by Jo Ann Odum of West Virginia. Odum was crowned by outgoing titleholder, Judith Ann Achter of Missouri. Odum went on to represent the United States at the Miss World 1961 Pageant in London later that year. She finished in the Top 7 at Miss World.

== Results ==
=== Placements ===
Placement	Contestant
Miss United States 1961	West Virginia – Jo Ann Odum
1st Runner-Up	New York – Janet Boring
2nd Runner-Up	California – Marlena Loren
3rd Runner-Up	Maryland – Diane Dolores White
4th Runner-Up	Missouri – Barbara Kohler

== Delegates ==
The Miss United States World 1961 delegates were:

- Atlantic City – Lonnie Bell
- California – Marlena Loren
- Connecticut – Jayne Burghardt
- Delaware – Alicia Silver
- District of Columbia – Patricia Alice Buck
- Florida – Lynne Shirley
- Georgia – Sandra New
- Idaho – Marva Jean Rich
- Kentucky – Louise King
- Louisville – Martha Shipp
- Maine – Jennifer Farrell
- Maryland – Diane Dolores White
- Massachusetts – Sandra Smith
- Michigan – Mikki Catsman
- Mississippi – Diane Carpenter
- Missouri – Barbara Kohler
- New Jersey – Ione Williams
- New York – Janet Boring
- New York City – Marilyn Chase
- North Carolina – Betsy Medlin
- Ohio – Judith Kay Tewalt
- Oregon – Sharon Wiley
- Pennsylvania – Marcia Freedman
- Philadelphia – Mary Lee Winton
- Rhode Island – Paula Holmes
- South Carolina – Judy Austin
- Spartanburg – Rita Souther
- Tennessee – Christine McSwain
- Texas – Cheryl Stubblefield
- Vermont – Florene Mayette
- Virginia – Laurie Mills
- West Virginia – Jo Ann Odum
- Wisconsin – Judith Greco
