= Miss United States 2014 =

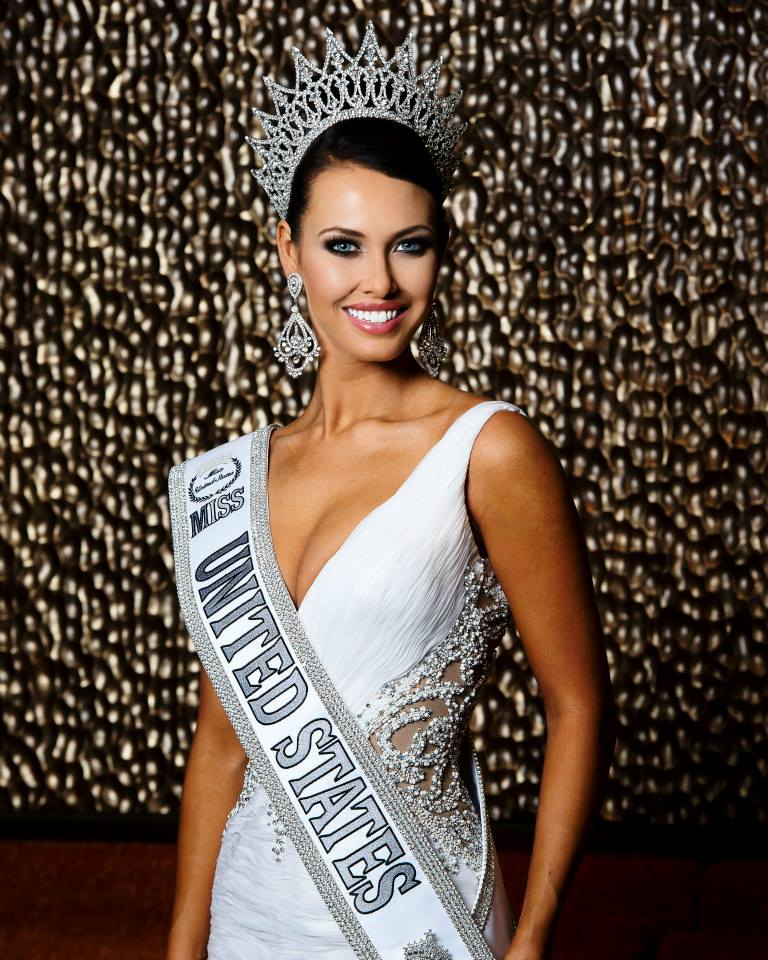
- Elizabeth Safrit, Miss United States 2014
- Date: July 4, 2014
- Presenters: Steven Roddy, Stephanie McGrane
- Venue: Washington, D.C., United States
- Entrants: 55
- Placements: 16
- Winner: Elizabeth Safrit; North Carolina

Miss United States 2014 was the 14th Miss United States pageant, held in Washington, D.C., United States, on July 4, 2014.

It was won by a contestant from North Carolina, Elizabeth Safrit, who also became Miss World America 2014, after Miss United States acquired the license for Miss World in the US, and was the 2nd runner-up of Miss World 2014 held during December 2014 in London. Safrit crowned her successors for both Miss United States 2015 and Miss World America 2015 the following year.

== State representation ==
The contest was attended by competitors from all states and territories of the United States. Each delegate represented their state or territory, including Guam, American Samoa, Virgin Islands, and Puerto Rico. The competition covered four categories: interview, swimwear, evening gown and on-stage question categories.

The 16 finalists again competed in swimwear. The top 10 from that round then competed again in the evening gown category and finally the top five participated in the on-stage question. The on-stage question this year was "With the state of the current economy, how do you justify competing in pageants?".

== Hosts ==
The pageant hosts were Steven Roddy and Stephanie McGrane. Steven Roddy is the founder of ThePageantPlanet.com, a website with interviews, updates, and news about the world of pageantry. Stephanie McGrane was then a host for PageantLive, a web-based media outlet focusing on all aspects of pageantry.

== Results ==
=== Placements ===
Placement	Contestant
Miss United States 2014	North Carolina – Elizabeth Safrit
1st Runner-Up	South Carolina – Mae-Ann Webb
2nd Runner-Up	Delaware – Vincenza Carrieri-Russo
3rd Runner-Up	Kentucky – Katy Moody
4th Runner-Up	Pennsylvania – Khari Siegfried
Top 10	Alabama – Jessica Escamilla; Florida – Tia McDonald; Iowa – Jessica Versteeg; Massachusetts – Renata De Carvalho; New Jersey – Jennifer De Cillis
Top 16	Hawaii – Lauren Hickey; Ohio – Chelsea Folden; Tennessee – Jordan Davis; Texas – Rachel White; Vermont – Raven Reed; Wyoming – Natasha Dirck

=== The Order of Announcements ===
Top 16

- Florida
- Hawaii
- Kentucky
- New Jersey
- Massachusetts
- Pennsylvania
- Iowa
- Texas
- Delaware
- North Carolina
- South Carolina
- Wyoming
- Vermont
- Tennessee
- Ohio
- Alabama

Top 10

- Iowa
- Florida
- Alabama
- Pennsylvania
- South Carolina
- North Carolina
- Kentucky
- Delaware
- Massachusetts
- New Jersey

== Delegates ==
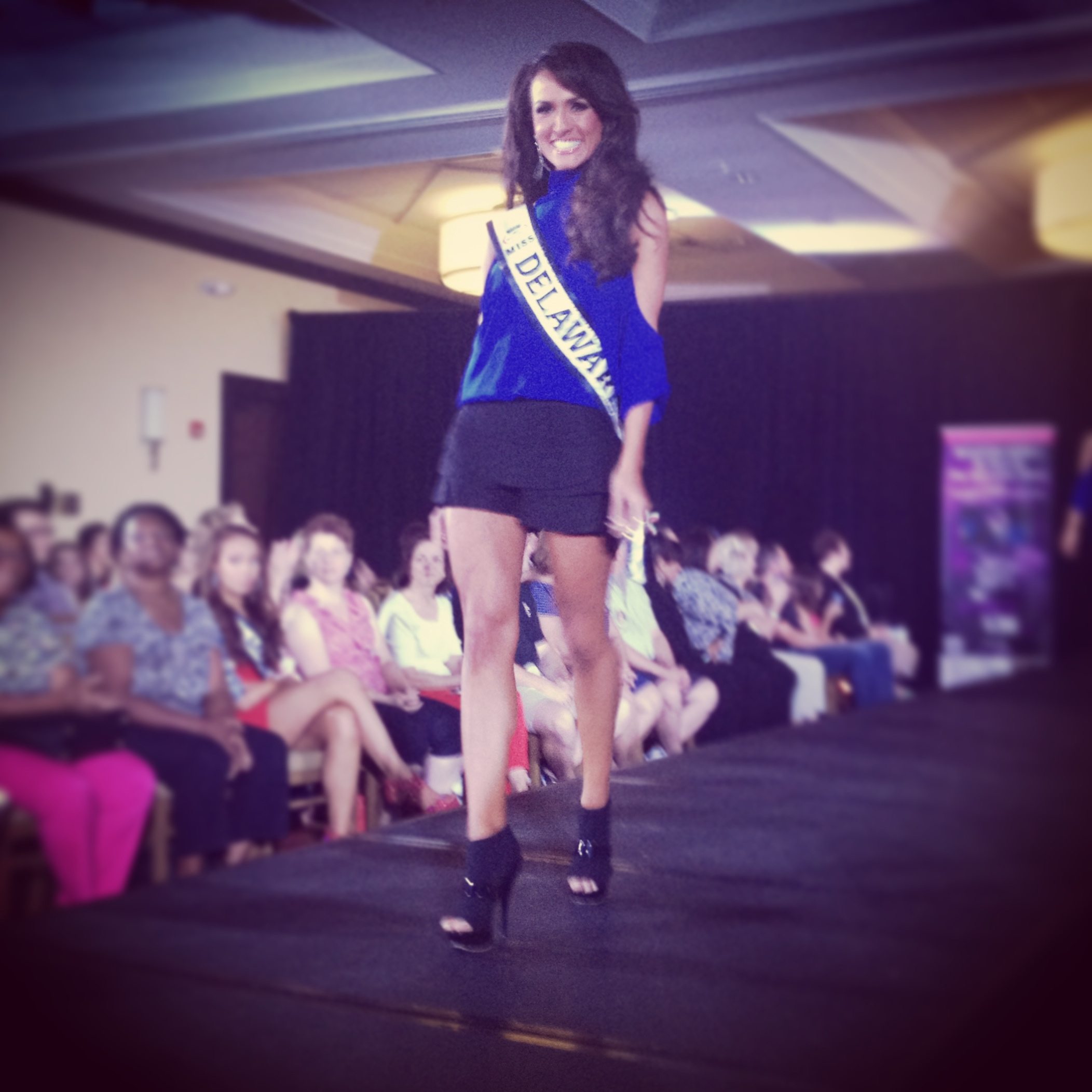
Vincenza Carrieri-Russo (Delaware)

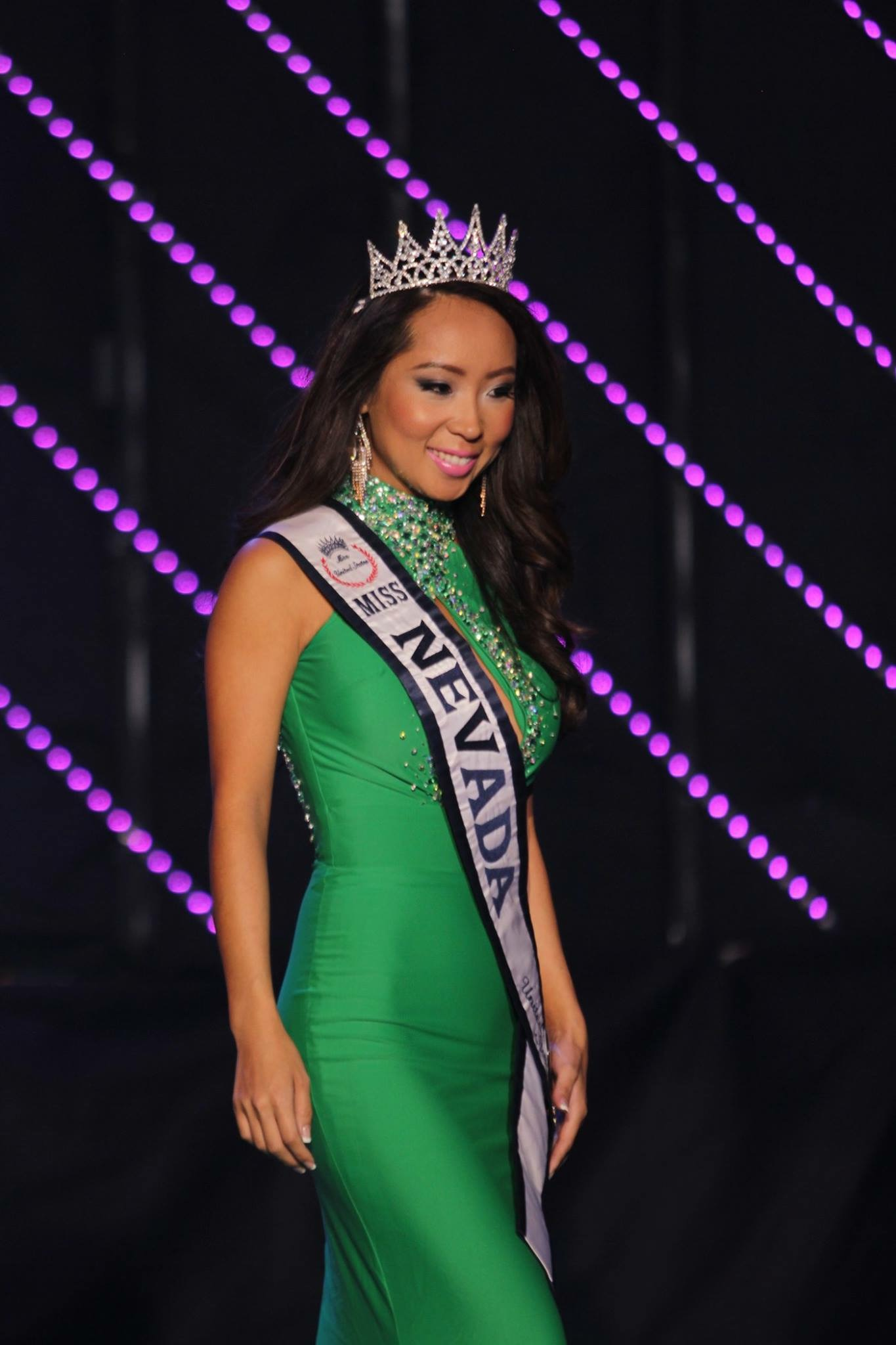
Lisa Song Sutton (Nevada)

The Miss United States 2014 delegates were:

- Alabama - Jessica Escamilla
- Alaska - Kassidy Whitley
- American Samoa - Meagan Moana Palelei HoChing
- Arizona - Savanna Troupe
- Arkansas - Danielle Vaughn
- California - Brandy Fisher
- Colorado - Jenna Fraizer
- Connecticut - Ashley Boate
- Delaware - Vincenza Carrieri-Russo
- (Washington, D.C.) District of Columbia - Shannon Lynch
- Florida - Tia McDonald
- (Georgia (U.S. state)) Georgia - Amy Brady
- Guam - Gilda Villela
- Hawaii - Lauren Hickey
- Idaho - Allison Urycki
- Illinois - Brittany Middlebrooks
- Indiana - Sylvia Crowder
- Iowa - Jessica Versteeg
- Kansas - Charity Stowers
- Kentucky - Katy Moody
- Louisiana - Alexis Corsentino
- Maine - Katherine Meservier
- Maryland - Amanda Ross
- Massachusetts - Renata De Carvalho
- Michigan - Heather Laymond
- Minnesota - Lucia Arseni
- Mississippi - TaNechi Temple
- Missouri - Alexandria Steele
- Montana - Erika Baldwin
- Nebraska - Dara Newson
- Nevada - Lisa Song Sutton
- New Hampshire - Candice Dodge
- New Jersey - Jennifer De Cillis
- New Mexico - Elizabeth Sheron
- (New York (state)) New York - Julia La Roche
- North Carolina - Elizabeth Safrit
- North Dakota - Jamie Whitehead
- Ohio - Chelsea Folden
- Oklahoma - Alexys Razien
- Oregon - Kendra Koback
- Pennsylvania - Khari Siegfried
- Puerto Rico - Anaís Vallejo
- Rhode Island - Mary Kate Gorman
- South Carolina - Mae-Ann Webb
- South Dakota - Sierah Tyson
- Tennessee - Jordan Davis
- Texas - Rachel White
- Utah - Alissa Drummond
- Vermont - Raven Reed
- Virginia - Phyllicia Whittingham
- (United States Virgin Islands) Virgin Islands (U.S.) - Jasmine Canady
- (Washington (state)) Washington - Roksolana Drofiak
- West Virginia - Chelsea Anderson
- Wisconsin - Kristy McFaul
- Wyoming - Natasha Dirck
