= Miss World USA 1975 =

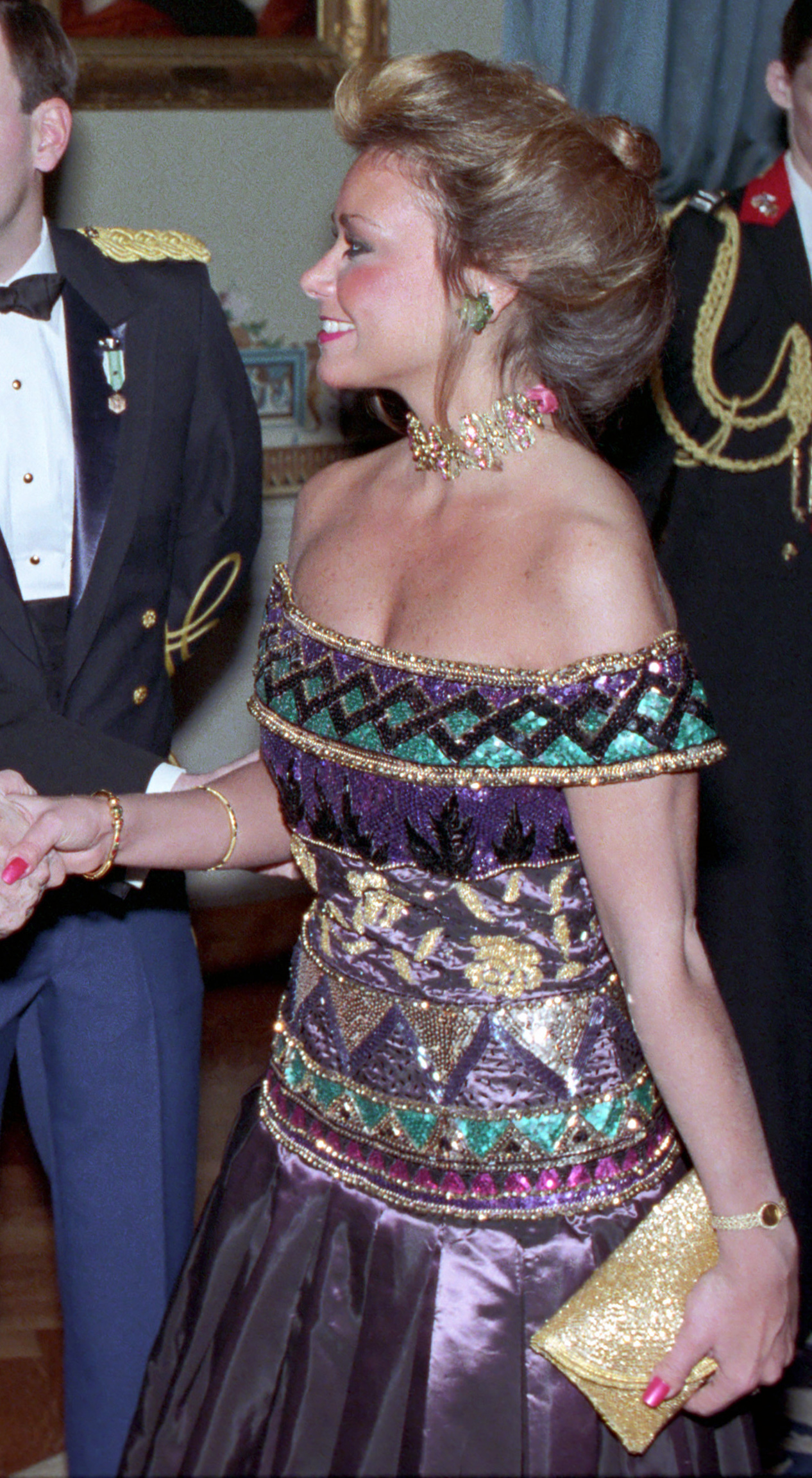
- Annelise Ilschenko in 1987
- Date: August 17, 1975
- Presenters: Bob Hope
- Entertainment: Bob Hope; Sammy Davis Jr.
- Venue: Springfield, Massachusetts
- Entrants: 48
- Winner: Annelise Ilschenko; Ohio

Miss World USA 1975 was the 14th edition of the Miss World USA pageant and it was held in Springfield, Massachusetts and was won by Annelise Ilschenko of Ohio. She was crowned by outgoing titleholder, Terry Browning of Florida. Ilschenko went on to represent the United States at the Miss World 1975 Pageant in London later that year.

== Results ==
=== Placements ===
Final results	Contestant
Miss World USA 1975	Ohio – Annelise Ilschenko
1st Runner-Up	Indiana – Julie Jo Clifford
2nd Runner-Up	Hawaii – Tracy Lynn Monsarrat
3rd Runner-Up	Massachusetts – Mona Jean Tessier
4th Runner-Up	Texas - Susan Schlesinger
Top 7	Arkansas - Mary Jane Comstock
Semi-Finalists	California - Debra Reichter; Connecticut - Annette L. Tedesco

== Delegates ==
The Miss World USA 1975 delegates were:

- Alabama - Denise Banks
- Alaska - Karen Elizabeth Malcolm
- Arizona - Crickett Jones
- Arkansas - Mary Jane Comstock
- California - Debra Reichter
- Colorado - Donna Marie Pfannenstiel
- Connecticut - Annette L. Tedesco
- Delaware - Natasha A. Prater
- (Washington, D.C.) District of Columbia - America "Mary" Lou Fackler
- Florida - Victoria Jean Bass
- (Georgia (U.S. state)) Georgia - Terry Eileen Morse
- Hawaii - Tracy Lynn Monsarrat
- Idaho - Raenae Gay
- Illinois - Carrie Anne Kravchuk
- Indiana - Julie Jo Clifford
- Kansas - Elise Mark Pratt
- Kentucky - Carol Louise Shanander
- Louisiana - Lottie Metzler
- Maine - Debra J. Collet
- Maryland - Elizabeth Erinn Pittengee
- Massachusetts - Mona Jean Tessier
- Michigan - Cynthia Mimi Guenther
- Minnesota - Sheri Hueffmeier
- Mississippi - Paula "Suzanne" Belcher
- Missouri - Tamara Sue Hultz
- Nebraska - Linda Ann Bott
- Nevada - Janice Ann Carrell
- New Hampshire - Robin Davis
- New Jersey - Deborah Ann Boone
- New Mexico - Kathryn Louise Rehm
- (New York (state)) New York - Hildegard Holig
- North Carolina - Tonda Brown
- Ohio - Annelise Ilschenko
- Oklahoma - Waukita Gaddy
- Oregon - Amanda Linn Peters
- Pennsylvania - Susan Volpe
- Rhode Island - Sue Strauss
- South Carolina - Vicki Corley
- South Dakota - Barbara Marie Guthmiller
- Tennessee - Susan Elizabeth Carlson
- Texas - Susan Schlesinger
- Utah - Karen Tucker
- Vermont - Nancy Gayle Wilson
- Virginia - Debbie Joan Evans
- (Washington (state)) Washington - Trudy Lorraine Holderby
- West Virginia - Rebecca Lynn Tudor
- Wisconsin - Debi Ann Burkman
- Wyoming - Tauna Presgrove

== Notes ==
=== Did not Compete ===
- Iowa
- Montana
- North Dakota

== Crossovers ==
Contestants who competed in other beauty pageants:

Miss USA

- 1972: Indiana: Julie Jo Clifford
- 1973: Tennessee: Susan Elizabeth Carlson (1st Runner-Up; as New York)

Miss International

- 1976: Tennessee: Susan Elizabeth Carlson (3rd Runner-up; as United States)
