= Miss World America 1994 =

- Date: October 3, 1994
- Venue: Veracruz, Mexico
- Entrants: 37
- Placements: 7
- Withdrawals: Alaska; Arizona; Arkansas; Colorado; Connecticut; Kansas; Maine; Missouri; Montana; New Hampshire; North Dakota; Oregon; Vermont; Wyoming
- Returns: Delaware; Nevada; New Mexico; Rhode Island
- Winner: Kristie Harmon (Georgia (U.S. state)) Georgia

Miss World America 1994 was the 6th edition of the Miss World America pageant and was held in Veracruz, Mexico. The title was won by Kristie Harmon of Georgia. She was crowned by outgoing titleholder, Maribeth Brown of Massachusetts. Harmon went on to represent the United States at the Miss World 1994 Pageant in South Africa later that year. She did not place at Miss World.

== Results ==
=== Placements ===
Final results	Contestant
Miss World America 1994	(Georgia (U.S. state)) Georgia – Kristie Harmon
1st Runner-Up	Michigan – Lainie Lu Howard
2nd Runner-Up	California – Angi Aylor
Top 7	Kentucky – Mimi Ford; Nevada – Alexis Oliver; North Carolina – Michelle Mauney; Texas – Ara Celi Valdez

== Delegates ==
The Miss World America 1994 delegates were:

- Alabama - Lilly Kamar
- California - Angi Aylor
- Delaware - Beth Ann Jones
- (Washington, D.C.) District of Columbia - Evangelin Smith
- Florida - Jessica White
- (Georgia (U.S. state)) Georgia - Kristie Harmon
- Hawaii - Annette Michard
- Idaho - Randi Thorp
- Illinois - Brenda Blazek
- Indiana - Shelly McKown
- Iowa - Ronda Carpenter
- Kentucky - Mimi Ford
- Louisiana - Crystal Downs
- Maryland - Jennifer Kelly
- Massachusetts - Michelle Gados
- Michigan - Lainie Lu Howard
- Minnesota - Heather McLeod
- Mississippi - Shea Broom
- Nebraska - Lisa Hatch
- Nevada - Alexis Oliver
- New Jersey - Yvonne Christiano
- New Mexico - Gina Swankie
- (New York (state)) New York - Fionna Kennedy
- North Carolina - Michelle Mauney
- Ohio - Marcia Mcguire
- Oklahoma - Penny Smith
- Pennsylvania - Terri MacIntosch
- Rhode Island - Tina Cordeira
- South Carolina - Michelle Pitts
- South Dakota - Shawn Frerichs
- Tennessee - Stephanie Kan
- Texas - Ara Celi Valdez
- Utah - Natalie Dixon
- Virginia - Chera Wood
- (Washington (state)) Washington - Celine Clements
- West Virginia - Amanda Mobley
- Wisconsin - Angela Pastorelli

== Notes ==
=== Withdrawals ===
- Arizona
- Arkansas
- Colorado
- Connecticut
- Kansas
- Maine
- Missouri
- Montana
- New Hampshire
- North Dakota

=== Returns ===
Last competed in 1992:

- Delaware
- Nevada
- New Mexico
- Rhode Island

=== Did not compete ===
- Alaska
- Oregon
- Vermont
- Wyoming

== Crossovers ==
Contestants who competed in other beauty pageants:

Miss Teen USA

- 1987: California: Angi Aylor
- 1989: New Jersey: Yvonne Christiano
- 1992: Georgia: Kristie Harmon

Miss USA

- 1992: Michigan: Lainie Lu Howard
- 1992: South Dakota: Shawn Frerichs
- 1993: Nevada: Alexis Oliver
- 1995: North Carolina: Michelle Mauney
