= Miss India Worldwide India =

National beauty pageant

- Formation: 1990
- Type: Beauty Pageant
- Location: India
- Members: Miss India Worldwide
- Official language: Standard Hindi, English

Miss India Worldwide India is a national beauty pageant in India that sends its winner to Miss India Worldwide. The incumbent titleholder is Apeksha Porwal from Mumbai who was 1st runner-up in Miss India Worldwide 2015 held in Mumbai, India

== History ==
India has been participating in Miss India Worldwide pageant since its inception in 1990. Karminder Kaur Virk made history in 1994 as the first Indian and Asian delegate to win the coveted title. Sandhya Chib followed suit in 1996.

Over the years, India has continued to excel in the competition, with a total of five Miss India Worldwide crowns won by Karminder Kaur Virk, Sandhya Chib, Aarti Chhabria, Purva Merchant, and Shagun Sarabhai.

== Titleholders ==
Color key

- : Declared as winner
- : Ended as runner-up or top 5/6 qualification
- : Ended as one of the finalists/semi-finalists
- : Unplaced but given special award(s)

Year	Delegate	Placement & Performance	
Year	Delegate	Placements	Special award(s)
1991	Rithu Singh	1st Runner-up	
1994	Karminder Kaur Virk	Miss India Worldwide 1994	
1996	Sandhya Chib	Miss India Worldwide 1996	
1997	Sumera Peerbhoy	Unplaced	1 Special Award: Miss Beautiful Eyes
1998	Himani Isar	Unplaced	
1999	Aarti Chhabria	Miss India Worldwide 1999	2 Special Awards: Miss Photogenic; Most Beautiful Face
2000	Sheetal Shah	2nd Runner-up	
2001	Anurithi Chikkerpur	Unplaced	
2002	Rohini Banjeree	2nd Runner-up	2 Special Awards: Miss Beautiful Skin; Miss Congeniality
2003	Purva Merchant	Miss India Worldwide 2003	1 Special Award: Miss Congeniality
2005	Anchal Dwivedi	Unplaced	
2006	Priyanka Jha	Top 6	
2007	Movina Nagarajan	Top 5	
2008	Shagun Sarabhai	Miss India Worldwide 2008	
2009	Deepthi Mary Varughese	Unplaced	
2011	Sukirti Kandpal	Top 10	1 Special Award: Miss Bollywood Diva
2012	Eram Karim	Top 11	1 Special Award: Miss Beautiful Figure
2013	Preeti Soni	Unplaced	
2014	Anugya Sharma	Top 11	
2015	Apeksha Porwal	1st Runner-up	1 Special Award: Best Talent
2016	Akila Narayanan	Unplaced	
2017	Reena Merchant	Unplaced	
2018	Renu Kaushal	Unplaced	
2019	Varuna Divekar	Unplaced	
2022	Riya Sapkal	Unplaced	1 Special Award: Miss Congeniality
2023	Aishwarya Dhatingan	Top 5	

== Notes ==
- Karminder Kaur Virk was the 1st runner-up in the Femina Miss India 1993 pageant and represented India at the Miss World 1993 competition.
- Sandhya Chib won the Femina Miss India 1996 title and went on to compete in the Miss Universe 1996 pageant, where she achieved a Top 10 finish.
- Ritu Singh won the Femina Miss India World title in 1991 and represented India at the Miss World 1991 competition, reaching the Top 6 finalists.
- Audrey D'silva, who was the 2nd runner-up in the Miss India Worldwide India 2014 pageant, later participated in the Indian Princess beauty pageant held at Rangsit University in Thailand and won the Best Body subtitle award.
- Apeksha Porwal was crowned Femina Miss India Delhi 2015 and was subsequently selected to represent Delhi at the Femina Miss India 2015 pageant.

== See also ==
- Femina Miss India
