= Shree Saini =

Indian-American philanthropist and motivational speaker (born 1996)

- Saini in 2019
- Born: January 6, 1996 (age 30); Punjab, India
- Education: University of Washington
- Occupations: Activist; philanthropist; motivational speaker; ballet dancer; beauty pageant titleholder
- Height: 5 ft 9 in (175 cm)
- Beauty pageant titleholder
- Title: Miss India USA 2017; Miss India Worldwide 2018; Miss Washington World 2019; Miss Washington World 2020; Miss World America 2021; Miss World Americas 2021
- Major competitions: Miss India USA 2017 (Winner); Miss India Worldwide 2018 (Winner); Miss World America 2021 (Appointed); Miss World 2021 (1st Runner-Up) (Miss World Americas)
- Website: shreesaini.org

Shree Saini (born January 6, 1996) is an Indian-American activist, philanthropist, motivational speaker, ballet dancer, and beauty pageant titleholder who was crowned Miss World America 2021, and later finished as the first runner-up of the Miss World 2021 pageant held in San Juan, Puerto Rico, where she also received the continental title of Miss World Americas 2021 and the Beauty With a Purpose Ambassador Award.

Saini is the first Asian and Indian American woman to represent the United States at Miss World, and was previously crowned Miss India USA 2017 and Miss India Worldwide 2018.

== Early life and education ==
Shree Saini was born on January 6, 1996, in Punjab, India, and has lived in the United States since age 5. She first dreamed of competing for the Miss World title at the age of 5. For the first 12 years of her life, while growing up in Moses Lake, Washington, Saini's heartbeat had an average of just 20 beats per minute. Doctors told her she could never dance again but she persisted, and continued training in ballet. At the age of 15, Saini was involved in a major car crash in Moses Lake that resulted in her suffering from significant facial burns. Saini was advised that her recovery would take a year, but she returned to her classes after just two weeks. Saini attended the University of Washington. She is a trained ballerina, and has been accepted to the Chicago Joffrey Ballet's summer intensive.

== Pageantry ==
=== Miss India USA 2017 ===
On December 7, 2017, Saini represented the state of Washington at the Miss India USA 2017, held at the Royal Albert's Palace in Fords, New Jersey. At the conclusion of the event, she was crowned Miss India USA 2017 by Madhu Valli, who also held the title of Miss India Worldwide 2017. In addition to winning the title, Saini was voted Miss Congeniality by her fellow delegates. Prior to her national victory, Saini competed in the Miss India Washington 2017, where she received the Best Talent Award, the People’s Choice Award, and the Top Interview Award.

=== Miss India Worldwide 2018 ===
As Miss India USA 2017, Saini represented the United States at the Miss India Worldwide 2018, held at the Royal Albert's Palace in Fords, New Jersey on December 1, 2018, where she competed alongside contestants from Indian communities in over 40 countries. At the conclusion of the pageant, Saini was crowned Miss India Worldwide 2018 by the outgoing titleholder Madhu Valli, becoming the third consecutive winner of Indian diaspora from the United States, following Karina Kohli in 2016 and Valli in 2017. She was also the tenth Indian American overall to capture the title.

=== Miss World America 2019 ===
On October 3, 2019, Saini was scheduled to compete in the Miss World America 2019 after being selected as Miss Washington World 2019. The national pageant was held at the The Orleans Hotel & Casino in Las Vegas, Nevada, where Saini was announced as the winner of four of the eight fast-track events that took place prior to the finals, winning the People’s Choice, Beauty with a Purpose, Top Influencers Award, and Entrepreneur Challenge events, and was also a runner-up in Talent and Top Model Challenge events. However, during the preliminary competition held the day before the coronation night, Saini collapsed and was taken to a hospital. According to her mother, she remained under observation for a possible cardiac arrest.

=== Miss World America 2020 ===
In 2020, Saini returned to compete in the Miss World America 2020, representing Washington. The competition was held virtually on October 16, 2020, due to the COVID-19 pandemic, with twenty-nine contestants from across the United States participating. At the conclusion of the event, Alissa Anderegg of New York was announced as the winner. Saini finished as a Top 10 semifinalist and received several awards, including the Influencer Award and the People’s Choice Award. She was also named the Miss World America Beauty with a Purpose National Ambassador, received a $2,000 Beauty with a Purpose Service Fund award, and was recognized for her Beauty with a Purpose projects by Julia Morley.

=== Miss World America 2021 ===
On October 2, 2021, Shree Saini was officially designated as Miss World America 2021 at a special ceremony in Los Angeles, California broadcast on KABC, and was crowned by Diana Hayden, Miss World 1997, making history as the first Indian-American and Asian-American woman to hold the Miss World America title. Her appointment granted her the rights to represented the United States of America at the Miss World 2021 international pageant held in San Juan, Puerto Rico. In February 2022, the Washington State Legislature passed a resolution recognizing Saini's philanthropic achievements and wishing her success at Miss World.

=== Miss World 2021 ===
Saini was the first runner up at Miss World 2021, with Karolina Bielawska of Poland the winner. She was also chosen as the 2021 Beauty with a Purpose Ambassador to travel with Bielawska during her reign. The second runner-up was Olivia Yacé of Côte d'Ivoire.

== Philanthropy ==
Saini has volunteered with hundreds of nonprofits including the USO, Paralyzed Veterans of America, Make A Wish, UNICEF, Victoria's Voice Foundation, American Heart Association, Children's Right And YOU, Doctors Without Borders, Special Olympics, homeless shelters, and several Anti Human Trafficking nonprofits and she has raised more than $200,000 for dozens of 10 nonprofits, including $50,000 for Variety Children's Charity. In 2020, Saini was awarded the World Peace Messenger award from Passion Vista Magazine in recognition for her hard work and dedication.

Awards and achievements
| Preceded by (France) Ophély Mézino | Miss World 1st Runner-Up; 2021 | Succeeded by (Lebanon) Yasmina Zaytoun |
| Preceded by (Brazil) Elís Miele Coelho | Miss World Americas; 2021 | Succeeded by (Brazil) Leticía Frota |
| Preceded by Alissa Anderegg (New York) | Miss World America; 2021 | Succeeded by Victoria DiSorbo (Tennessee) |
