= Miss India =

Miss India may refer to:

== Beauty pageants ==
- Femina Miss India, selects representatives to compete in Miss World
  - Femina Miss India Bangalore
  - Femina Miss India Delhi
  - Femina Miss India South
- Miss India Worldwide India, selects representative for Miss India Worldwide
- Miss India International
- Miss Earth India
- Miss India USA, in the United States
- Miss India Connecticut, in the United States

== Other uses ==
- Miss India (2020 film), a film by Narendra Nath
- Miss India (1957 film), a film by S. D. Burman
- Miss India (TV series), 2004–2007
- Miss New India, 2011 novel by Bharati Mukherjee

== See also ==
- India at the Big Four international beauty pageants
- Elite Model Look India, an annual modelling contest
- Glamanand Supermodel India, that sends its winners to Miss Grand International
- I Am She–Miss Universe India, a former pageant
- Miss Diva, part of Femina Miss India that sends its winners to Miss Universe
- Miss Divine Beauty, selects India's representatives to compete at Miss Earth and Miss International
- Miss Earth India, women who represent India at Miss Earth
- Miss Transqueen India, an Indian beauty pageant for transgender people
