= Miss Washington World =

Beauty pageant competition

- Formation: 1951
- Type: Beauty pageant
- Headquarters: Seattle
- Location: Washington
- Members: Miss World America (1951–present)
- Official language: English
- State Director: Miss World America Organization
- Website: Official Website

Miss Washington World is an American state beauty pageant that selects a representative for the Miss World America national competition from the State of Washington. The pageant is headquartered in Seattle, King County.

To date, three women from Washington have been crowned Miss World America:

- Johnine Leigh Avery, 1968
- Erin Michelle Cummins, 2011
- Shree Saini, 2021

== Winners ==
Color key

- Declared as Winner/Ended as Miss World America
- Ended as runner-up
- Ended as one of the finalists or semifinalists
- Ended as special awards winner
- Ended as Miss USA

| Year | Name | Hometown | Age (Note: Age at the time of the Miss World America pageant) | Placement at Miss World America | Special awards at Miss World America | Notes |
|---|---|---|---|---|---|---|
| 2020 | Shree Saini | Ellensburg | 24 | Top 10 | Top 10 Beauty with a Purpose, Top 10 Talent, Top Influencer Award, People's Choice Award | |
| 2019 | Shree Saini | Ellensburg | 23 | | People's Choice; Beauty With a Purpose; Top Influencers Award; Entrepreneur Challenge Winner | Previously Miss India USA 2017 and Miss India Worldwide 2018. |
| 2018 | Did not compete | | | | | |
| 2017 | Did not compete | | | | | |
| 2016 | Keilani Afalava | Seattle | 26 | | Most Photogenic | |
| 2016 | Annysia Arthur | Seattle | 23 | | | Later Miss Earth Washington 2017 and unplaced at Miss Earth United States 2017. |
| 2015 | Delia Lubanovici | Seattle | 23 | Top 22 | Miss Congeniality | Became Miss Washington World after the original winner resigned. |
| 2015 | Trinity Shaffer | | | Did not compete | | Shaffer resigned for personal reasons. |
Miss Washington United States 2014
| 2014 | Roksolana Drofiak | | | | | |
Miss Washington World
| 2013 | No titleholders as Miss World America was designated from 2006 to 2013. | | | | | |
| 2012 | No titleholders as Miss World America was designated from 2006 to 2013. | | | | | |
| 2011 | No titleholders as Miss World America was designated from 2006 to 2013. | | | | | |
| 2010 | No titleholders as Miss World America was designated from 2006 to 2013. | | | | | |
| 2009 | No titleholders as Miss World America was designated from 2006 to 2013. | | | | | |
| 2008 | No titleholders as Miss World America was designated from 2006 to 2013. | | | | | |
| 2007 | No titleholders as Miss World America was designated from 2006 to 2013. | | | | | |
| 2006 | No titleholders as Miss World America was designated from 2006 to 2013. | | | | | |
| 2005 | No known representatives from Washington from 2003 to 2005. | | | | | |
| 2004 | No known representatives from Washington from 2003 to 2005. | | | | | |
| 2003 | No known representatives from Washington from 2003 to 2005. | | | | | |
| 2002 | No titleholders as Miss World America was designated from 1995 to 2002. | | | | | |
| 2001 | No titleholders as Miss World America was designated from 1995 to 2002. | | | | | |
| 2000 | No titleholders as Miss World America was designated from 1995 to 2002. | | | | | |
| 1999 | No titleholders as Miss World America was designated from 1995 to 2002. | | | | | |
| 1998 | No titleholders as Miss World America was designated from 1995 to 2002. | | | | | |
| 1997 | No titleholders as Miss World America was designated from 1995 to 2002. | | | | | |
| 1996 | No titleholders as Miss World America was designated from 1995 to 2002. | | | | | |
| 1995 | No titleholders as Miss World America was designated from 1995 to 2002. | | | | | |
| 1994 | Celine Clements | | | | | |
| 1993 | Christine Swinehart | | | | | |
| 1992 | Shah-yee Jackson | | | | | |
Miss Washington USA 1981-1991
| 1991 | Lanae Williams | Burien | | | | |
| 1990 | Melissa Dickson | Seattle | | | | |
| 1989 | Chiann Fan Gibson | Seattle | | | | |
| 1988 | Sandra Kord | Seattle | | | | |
| 1987 | Jennifer Doerflinger | Seattle | | | | |
| 1986 | Jacqueline McMahon | Orting | | | | |
| 1985 | Sherry Rials | Bellevue | | | | |
| 1984 | Sue Gerrish | Seattle | | | | |
| 1983 | Kathi Tucker | Renton | | Top 12 | | Mother of Tucker Perry, Miss Tennessee USA 2010, who placed in the Top 10 at Miss USA 2010. |
| 1982 | Jana Minerich | Seattle | | | | |
| 1981 | Leila Wagner | Seattle | | | | |
Miss Washington World
| 1980 | Kellie Colleen Jones | Lake Forest Park | 21 | | | Miss Photogenic and runner up, Miss Washington USA |
| 1979 | Sydney Louise Smith | | | | | |
| 1978 | Ivy Lynn Reed | Lynnwood | 18 | | | Previously Miss Washington USA 1977 and contestant at Miss USA 1977. |
| 1977 | Unknown | | | | | |
| 1976 | Salli Ann Wainwright | | | | | |
| 1975 | Trudy Lorraine Holderby | | | | | |
| 1974 | Norene Lee Gilbert | Custer | 23 | | | Later Miss Washington USA 1976 and Top 12 semi-finalist at Miss USA 1976. |
| 1973 | Lexie H. Brockway | Richland | 19 | 1st Runner-up/Miss World USA 1973 | | Originally the 1st Runner-up at Miss World USA. Later became Miss World USA after the original winner, Marjorie Wallace, resigned after winning Miss World 1973. |
| 1972 | Debra Kelley | | | | | |
| 1971 | Sharon Lynne Conrad | | | | | |
| 1970 | Debra Sue Dollemore | | | | | |
| 1969 | Marie Albertson | | | | | |
| 1968 | Johnine Leigh Avery | Los Angeles, CA | 23 | Miss World USA 1968 | | Unlaced at Miss World 1968. |
| 1967 | Johnine Leigh Avery | Los Angeles, CA | 22 | 1st Runner-up | | Later Miss World USA 1968. |
| 1966 | Unknown | | | | | |
| 1965 | Did not compete | | | | | |
| 1964 | Betty Silcott | | | | | |
| 1963 | La Rayne Richards | | | | | |
| 1962 | Patricia Dzejachok | | | Top 15 | | |
| 1961 | Did not compete | | | | | |
| 1960 | Did not compete | | | | | |
| 1959 | No known representatives from Washington in 1958 & 1959. | | | | | |
| 1958 | No known representatives from Washington in 1958 & 1959. | | | | | |
Miss Washington USA 1953-1957
| 1957 | Diana Schafer | | | Top 15 | | |
| 1956 | June Svedin | | | Top 15 | | |
| 1955 | Shirley Givins | | | Top 15 | | |
| 1954 | Darlene Shride | | | | | |
| 1953 | Nancy Petraborg | | | 3rd Runner-up | | |
Miss Washington World
| 1952 | No known representatives from Washington in 1951 & 1952. | | | | | |
| 1951 | No known representatives from Washington in 1951 & 1952. | | | | | |

Notes to table
