= Yadvi – The Dignified Princess =

Yadvi - The Dignified Princess
- Directed by: Jyoti Singh
- Written by: Gauri Singh
- Produced by: Jyoti Singh
- Starring: Chandrachur Singh; Charu Vyas; Rahul Godara; Vibhu Raghave; Jyoti Singh
- Music by: Anuj Garg
- Release date: August 25, 2017
- Country: India
- Language: English

Yadvi – The Dignified Princess is an Indian English film produced and directed by Jyoti Singh.

The film stars Chandrachur Singh and popular Indian TV actor Vibhu Raghave. Miss India Worldwide 2009 Nikkitasha Marwaha also had a cameo in the film. The film was released theatrically on August 25, 2017. The screenplay was written by Gauri Singh, who is also the Founder of Wake Forest Film Festival, North Carolina Indian And South Asian Film Festival, and Franklin Flicks Film Festival.

== Story ==
The film is about a real life princess raised in an extremely wealthy family who ends up losing all her privileges in her middle age. Set in 1940s India, much before the cry for feminist equality caught ground, the princess not only holds her own dignity but raises three daughters.

It showcases the life and times of Maharani Yadhuvansh Kumari, Patiala's Maharaja Bhupinder Singh of Patiala.

The film tells the story of integrity and true grit in face of unexpected adversity. Yadvi, will take you on her journey through the India of Kings and Queens, of Princes and polygyny. Her deep internal strength bolstering her family honour will inspire viewers.

== Cast ==
- Chandrachur Singh as His Highness Maharaja Bhupinder Singh
- Charu Vyas as Her Highness Maharani Vimal Kaur
- Rahul Godara as Yuvraj Govind Singh
- Jyoti Singh as Yadvi
- Vibhu Raghave as Prince Billie
- Namya Saxena as Yadvi
- Gauri Singh as Gauri Singh
- Nikkitasha Marwaha
- Reshaa Sabarawal
- Mini Pandit
- Ashwarya Singh

== Film festivals and awards ==
Yadvi - The Dignified Princess was screened at multiple film festivals across the world, including Manhattan Film Festival and DC South Asian Film Festival.

- Best Director (Jyoti Singh) at 4th Indian Cine Film Festival, 2016
- Best Music (Anuj Garg) at 4th Indian Cine Film Festival, 2016
- Globe Award at Around Intl. Film Festival, May 2016
- Award of Recognition for Film Feature at Global Film Competition, November 2016
- Best Feature Film: Yadvi (3rd Prize) at Rishikesh Art & Film Festival, 2017
- Gold Award Winner at International Film Festival for Women, Social Issues, and Zero Discrimination
- World Platinum Award at World's Women Award
- Best Direction at NCISAFF
- Best Screenplay (Gauri Singh) at NCISAFF
- Best Film at NCISAFF
- Best Actress (Jyoti Singh) at NCISAFF
- Best Emerging Female Director (Jyoti Singh) at Dada Saheb Phalake Film Festival
- Award of Excellence, Lead Actress (Jyoti Singh) at Depth of Field International Film Festival
- Award of Excellence, Lead Actor (Vibhu Raghave) at Depth of Field International Film Festival
- AWARD of Outstanding Excellence, Editing (Vick Krishna) at Depth of Field International Film Festival
- AWARD of Excellence, Original Concept (Gauri Singh) at Depth of Field International Film Festival
- Best Cinematography (Jigme Tenzing), at The People's Film Festival
- Nomination for Best Actress
