= Miss India Worldwide =

Beauty pageant

- Formation: 1990; 36 years ago
- Founder: Dharmatma Saran
- Founded at: New York City, United States
- Type: Beauty Pageant
- Headquarters: New York City
- Location: United States
- Official language: English
- Chairman: Dharmatma Saran
- Key people: Monica Gill
- Parent organization: Dharmatma Saran, Worldwide Pageants
- Website: www.worldwidepageants.com

Miss India Worldwide is a beauty pageant which draws contestants from India and from among members of the Indian diaspora residing in other countries. It is conducted by India Festival Committee (IFC), first founded and headed by Dharmatma Saran in New York City, USA.

== History ==
The pageant started in 1990. Simi Chaddha (now Dr. Simi Chaddha Ranajee), from the United States, was crowned the first ever Miss India Worldwide in New York City. Simi was the winner of the 1990 Miss India USA pageant. The pageant was held in the United States until 1996. In 1997, the pageant was hosted in India. Poonam Chibber of Canada became the first Miss India Worldwide winner to be crowned outside the United States. It was the first time that the pageant moved out of its home turf and was held in the Asian continent. The next year in 1998 the pageant moved to the southeast region of Asia and was held in Singapore. Once again, Canada's representative Melissa Bhagat was crowned the Miss India Worldwide 1998 by outgoing titleholder Poonam Chibber, giving Canada a rare back to back victory at the pageant. Canada is one of three countries to have a back to back victory, the other two being the USA and the UK.

The pageant moved back to the United States in 2000 and was held in Florida. Rita Upadhyay of the United States was crowned Miss India Worldwide 2000 and became the fourth woman from the United States to win the crown. Since 2012 international choreographer Sandip Soparrkar is the official show director and grooming expert.

== Notable Miss India Worldwide Participants ==
Past pageant participants include Bollywood actress Pallavi Sharda (Miss India Australia 2010), media personality and television host Amin Dhillon (Miss India Worldwide Canada 2010), and Indian television actress Uppekha Jain (Miss India Worldwide Canada 2008).

== Titleholders ==
Year	Nation represented	Miss India Worldwide	National Title	City	Country	Notes
1990	United States	Simmi Chadha	Miss India USA	New York City	United States	
1991	United States	Bela Bajaria	Miss India USA	New York City	United States	Bajaria would go on to become an executive at Universal Television.
1992	United States	Icha Singh	Miss India USA	New York City	United States	
1994	India	Karminder Kaur Virk	Miss India Worldwide India	New York City	United States	The first of five wins for a Miss India Worldwide India titleholder. This was the first year in which Hong Kong sent a delegate to the worldwide pageant, Puja Venkataraman who was Miss India Hong Kong winner, which was held in New York City; local businessman Hari Harilela was one of the judges.
1995	Hong Kong	Nirupama Anand	Miss India Hong Kong	New York City	United States	First winner from Hong Kong.
1996	India	Sandhya Chib	Miss India Worldwide India	New York City	United States	Also became a semi-finalist in Miss Universe 1996
1997	Canada	Poonam Chibber	Miss India Canada	Mumbai	India	The first win by a Miss India Worldwide Canada titleholder. Chibber would go on to become a Bollywood actress.
1998	Canada	Melissa Bhagat	Miss India Canada	Singapore	Singapore	Bhagat went on to work for the Department of Citizenship and Immigration Canada under Minister Jason Kenney.
1999	India	Aarti Chabria	Miss India Worldwide India	Rahway	United States	Third winner from India
2000	United States	Rita Upadhyay	Miss India USA	Tampa	United States	Held in November 2000. Upadhyay was age 23 and a New York-based staff writer for Time magazine then.
2001	South Africa	Sarika Sukhdeo	Miss India South Africa	San Jose	United States	Originally scheduled to be held in Durban, South Africa, it was later delayed until March 2002 and moved to San Jose, California. Nevertheless, Sarika Sukhdeo of Durban garnered the first win for a Miss India Worldwide South Africa titleholder after ten years of South African delegates to the worldwide pageant.
2002	United Arab Emirates	Santripti Vellody	Miss India UAE	Durban	South Africa	First winner from UAE. Held in November 2002
2003	India	Purva Merchant	Miss India Worldwide India	San Francisco	United States	Held in September 2003
2005	United Kingdom	Amrita Hunjan	Miss India UK	Mumbai	India	Held in February 2005; the fourteenth edition of the Miss India Worldwide pageant.
2006	United States	Trina Chakravarty	Miss India USA	Mumbai	India	
2007	Suriname	Fareisa Joemmanbaks	Miss India Suriname	Fords	United States	Held in April 2007. Joemmanbaks would later go on to a career in Mollywood.
2008	India	Shagun Sarabhai	Miss India South Africa	Johannesburg	South Africa	Held in February 2008. Prizes included $5,000 in cash, jewellery, clothing, and a notebook computer.
2009	United States	Nikkitasha Marwaha	Miss India USA	Durban	South Africa	Held in February 2009. Marwaha was age 20 and a drama student at the time. She went on to star in the Indian television series 24.
2010	South Africa	Kajal Lutchminarian	Miss India South Africa	Durban	South Africa	Held in March 2010. Lutchminarian was age 21 and a medical student at the time.
2011	Australia	Ankita Ghazan	Miss India Australia	Abu Dhabi	United Arab Emirates	Held in May 2011; the twentieth edition of the pageant. Ghazan was age 19 and a university student at the time.
2012	Guyana	Alana Seebarran	Miss India Guyana	Paramaribo	Suriname	Held in February 2012. Following her crowning, Seebarran had various conflicts with the organisers, and was not invited to the following year's pageant in Malaysia to crown the new winner.
2013	United Kingdom	Nehal Bhogaita	Miss India UK	Kuala Lumpur	Malaysia	Held in May 2013. Bhogaita was the first deaf contestant in the pageant's history.
2014	United States	Monica Gill	Miss India USA	Dubai	United Arab Emirates	Held in June 2014. Prizes included $8,000 in cash, as well as photo assignments and modelling sessions.
2015	Oman	Stephanie Lohale	Miss India Oman	Mumbai	India	First winner from Oman. Pageant held in September 2015.
2016	United States	Karina Kohli	Miss India USA	New Jersey	United States	
2017	United States	Madhu Valli	Miss India USA	New Jersey	United States	Pageant held in October, 2017. Winner is a student of criminal law and a hip hop artist from USA.
2018	United States	Shree Saini	Miss India USA	Washington	United States	Pageant held in December, 2018. Shree is a pacemaker patient and a graduate from University of Washington, who studied at Harvard, Yale and Stanford. She won the "Best Titleholder" award from the pageant community for her endless service work with hundreds of charities.
2019	Oman	Tanishq Sharma	Miss India Oman	Mumbai	India	Pageant held in December, 2019.
2022	United Kingdom	Khushi Patel	Miss India UK	New Jersey	United States	Pageant held in June, 2022.
2023	Guyana	Aruna Sukhdeo	Miss India Guyana	Pune	India	Pageant held in June, 2023.
2024	United States	Dhruvi Patel	Miss India USA	New Jersey	United States	Pageant held in September, 2024.
