= Shatrughan Sinha =

Indian actor and politician (born 1946)

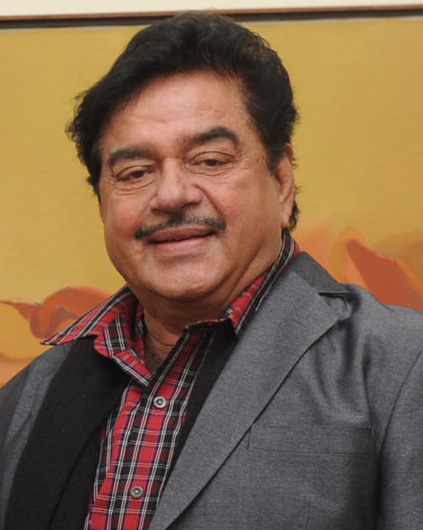
- Sinha in 2017

Member of Parliament, Lok Sabha
- Incumbent
- Assumed office 16 April 2022
- Preceded by: Babul Supriyo
- Constituency: Asansol, West Bengal
- In office 16 May 2009 – 23 May 2019
- Preceded by: Constituency established
- Succeeded by: Ravi Shankar Prasad
- Constituency: Patna Sahib, Bihar

35th Union Minister of Health and Family Welfare
- In office 22 July 2002 – 29 January 2003
- Prime Minister: Atal Bihari Vajpayee
- Preceded by: C. P. Thakur
- Succeeded by: Sushma Swaraj

3rd Union Minister of Shipping
- In office 30 January 2003 – 22 May 2004
- Prime Minister: Atal Bihari Vajpayee
- Preceded by: Ved Prakash Goyal
- Succeeded by: K. Chandrashekhar Rao

Member of Parliament, Rajya Sabha
- In office 10 April 1996 – 9 April 2008
- Constituency: Bihar

Personal details
- Born: Shatrughan Prasad Sinha; 15 July 1946 (age 80) Patna, Bihar, British India
- Party: All India Trinamool Congress Since 2022
- Other political affiliations: Indian National Congress (2019–2022); Bharatiya Janata Party (1980–2019)
- Spouse: Poonam Sinha (m. 1980)
- Children: 3; including Sonakshi and Luv
- Education: Patna Science College, Patna; FTII, Pune
- Occupation: Actor; politician
- Nicknames: Shotgun; Shatru

Shatrughan Prasad Sinha (born 15 July 1946) is an Indian actor and politician. He is a Member of Parliament, Lok Sabha from Asansol constituency as a member of All India Trinamool Congress. Earlier, he was elected as Member of Parliament, Lok Sabha (2009–2014, 2014–2019) from Patna Sahib. He was also a Member of Parliament, Rajya Sabha from 1996–2002 and 2002–2008. He was a Union Cabinet Minister of Health and Family Welfare and Shipping in the Atal Bihari Vajpayee government. He was a member of standing committee on Transport, Tourism and Culture and member of consultative committee in the Ministry of External Affairs and overseas Indian affairs from 2014 to 2019. In 2016, his biography, Anything but Khamosh, was released.

Sinha first gained popularity in the early 1970s playing supporting roles in successful films, including Mere Apne, Bombay to Goa, Raampur Ka Lakshman, Do Yaar, Aa Gale Lag Jaa, Heera, Dost and Do Thug. He achieved stardom with Kalicharan (1976) and consistently starred in top–grossing Indian films from the late-1970s to the 1980s, such as Vishwanath, Jaani Dushman, Kaala Patthar, Dostana, Kranti, Naseeb, Ilzaam, Khudgarz and Aag Hi Aag, as well as some of his acclaimed performances, such as Paras, Tanhai, Blackmail, Muqabla, Bombay 405 Miles, Naram Garam, Haathkadi, Phaansi Ke Baad, Khoon Bhari Maang and Adharm.

== Early life ==
Sinha was born in Patna, Bihar, to Bhuvaneshwar Prasad Sinha and Shyama Devi Sinha on 15 July 1946. He is the youngest of four brothers – Ram, Lakshman, Bharat and himself. He graduated from Patna Science College with a Bachelor of Science degree. He then earned a Diploma in Acting from the Film and Television Institute of India Pune. Currently the institute awards a scholarship to Diploma students in his name. He moved to Mumbai, where he started his career in the film industry. He is married to former Miss India Poonam Sinha (née Chandiramani).

== Acting career ==
Sinha got his first acting opportunity playing a Pakistani military officer in Dev Anand's Prem Pujari. Before that, he got a small role as a police inspector in Mohan Sehgal's Sajan in 1969. The release of Prem Pujari was delayed, so his first released film was Sajan. He later appeared in villainous roles in Pyar Hi Pyar, Banphool, Manmohan Desai's Raampur Ka Lakshman, Bhai Ho Toh Aisa, Sultan Ahmed's Heera, and in Vijay Anand's Blackmail.

He played supporting roles in many films before appearing in Gulzar's Mere Apne in 1971. He was cast along with his future wife Poonam Sinha, then called as Komal, in the movie Sabak (1973). He played supporting roles in Khilona, Dulal Guha's Dost in 1974, Aa Gale Lag Jaa, Jheel Ke Us Paar and Gambler in 1970. He later acted in Bombay to Goa, Dostana and Naseeb. His films as the lead hero between 1970 and 1975 were not hits. His first successful film as lead hero was in Kalicharan in 1976. Subhash Ghai went with the story of Kalicharan to N. N. Sippy and said he wanted to direct his first film. N. N. Sippy got ready to produce after few days, but wanted to cast only Rajesh Khanna in the lead role of Kalicharan. When N. N. Sippy confirmed with Rajesh Khanna that Khanna did not have dates for the years 1976 and 1977, Sippy asked Subhash Ghai to go ahead with the script and direct Kalicharan with Sinha in the lead. He acted with Amitabh Bachchan in films like Raaste Kaa Patthar, Yaar Meri Zindagi, Shaan and Kaala Patthar, of which Shaan was the biggest success.

The films Sinha played the lead hero were Ab Kya Hoga, Khan Dost, Yaaraon Ka Yaar, Dillagi, Vishwanath, Muqabla and Jaani Dushman. He then became a bankable action hero from early eighties to mid-nineties. He co-starred with Sanjeev Kumar in Bereham, Hathkadi, Baad Aur Badnaam, Chehre Pe Chehra, Hirasat and Qatl. He starred in Hrishikesh Mukherjee's Naram Garam, Brij's Bombay 405 Miles and Taqdeer. He has sung the song "Ek Baat Suni Hai Chachaji" with singer Sushma Shrestha in the film Naram Garam in 1981, composed by R. D. Burman. However, when his films as lead hero like Prakash Mehra's Jwalamukhi, Amjad Khan's Chor Police, Ameer Aadmi Garib Aadmi and Raj Khosla's Mera Dost Meraa Dushman became flops, despite being appreciated by critics, there was threat to his career as lead hero. He also produced and acted in the film Kalka, based on life of coal mine workers, released in 1983.

He then bounced back by bagging roles in films, with Rajesh Khannna as the lead hero, like Dil E Nadan, Aaj Ka M.L.A Ram Avtaar, Maqsad and Paapi Pet Ka Sawal Hai. His other hit films in the mid-eighties included Jeene Nahi Doonga, Bhawani Junction, Aandhi-Toofan, Ramkali, Ilzaam and Asli Naqli. He then went on to star with Jeetendra in Hoshiyar, Khudgarz, Ranbhoomi and Mulzim. He co-starred with Dharmendra in Insaniyat Ke Dushman, Loha (1987), Aag Hi Aag (1987), Hawalaat and Zalzala. He was in films like Telephone (1985), Sherni (1988), Khoon Bhari Maang (1988) and Adharm (1992). He starred with Raajkumar in Betaaj Badshah in 1994 and Salman Khan in Chaand Kaa Tukdaa in 1994. Sinha credited Rajesh Khanna for getting him Kaalicharan and for the revival of his career as lead hero in the 1980s, however their friendship got affected when Shatrughan Sinha stood as the BJP candidate against Rajesh Khanna in the 1992 election. Though as a Congress candidate Khanna defeated Sinha by 25,000 margin of votes, Khanna was disappointed at Sinha for standing against him in the elections.

Sinha was selected by Rediff as one of the most unconventional actors in Hindi cinema (the others being Ajay Devgan, Amitabh Bachchan, Irrfan Khan, Rajesh Khanna, Rajinikanth, Shahrukh Khan and Sunil Shetty). In 2008, he became a judge on The Great Indian Laughter Challenge show, season 4 on STAR One TV. On 3 October 2009, Sinha appeared on Sony Entertainment Television Asia's show Dus Ka Dum season 2 as host for a special episode. He is currently hosting the Bhojpuri version of the popular game show Kaun Banega Crorepati on Mahuaa channel.

He portrayed Chief Minister Konda Shivaji Rao, a character based on NTR in Ram Gopal Varma's Rakta Charitra.

== Political career ==
Sinha entered politics by contesting in a by-election opposite Rajesh Khanna. He quoted in an interview that his biggest regret in his life was contesting election against his friend Khanna. Khanna won the election by 25,000 votes but was hurt and never spoke to Sinha thereafter. Sinha did try to reconcile with Khanna but to no avail; Khanna died in 2012.

He won the Patna Sahib Lok Sabha constituency in Bihar during the 2009 Indian general elections. He defeated another cinema celebrity, Shekhar Suman. Out of a total of 552,293 votes polled, Sinha received 316,549 votes. He won the seat in the subsequent 2014 Indian general elections as well. In 2014, he received 485,905 from the 813,411 total votes polled.

Sinha became a cabinet minister in the Third Vajpayee ministry from the 13th Lok Sabha, holding two portfolios, the Ministry of Health and Family Welfare (January 2003 – May 2004), and the Department of Shipping (August 2004). As of May 2006, he was appointed as the head of the BJP Culture and Arts Department.

On 6 April 2019, Sinha became a member of the Indian National Congress in presence of Congress general secretary K. C. Venugopal and Randeep Surjewala. Sinha became a member of the Indian National Congress Party, having joined them after not being given a seat for the 2019 Indian general elections by the Bharatiya Janata Party.

In March 2022, Sinha joined Trinamool Congress to contest in the By-election for the Asansol Lok Sabha constituency. On 16 April 2022, Sinha won by defeating Bharatiya Janata Party's Agnimitra Paul by a margin of 303,209 votes.

In the 2024 Indian general elections, Sinha won from Asansol seat, defeating BJP's Surendrajit Singh Ahluwalia by a margin of 59,564 votes.

=== 2026 Rebellion ===
In June 2026, almost immediately after the massive Trinamool Congress defeat, around 20 MPs of TMC including Yusuf Pathan, Saayoni Ghosh, Sinha, Bapi Halder, Mala Roy, Mitali Bag, Deepak Adhikari, Arup Chakraborty, Sharmila Sarkar, Satabdi Roy, Rachna Banerjee, Prasun Banerjee and others, allegedly declared rebellion from their Party, and presented their written wish to join Bhartiya Janata Party. This group was led by Kakoli Ghosh.

Later, on 14 June, 20 MPs, including Sinha, signed a formal letter declaring their split from Trinamool Congress as to merge with the Nationalist Citizen Party of India (NCPI). They formally submitted the letter to Lok Sabha Speaker Om Birla.

The total strength of TMC in Lok Sabha had been 28, so that a number of 20 MPS made it eligible for splitting from the Party, as per the Indian Defection laws, so as to escape the anti-defection disqualification.

== Awards ==
| Year | Category | Movie | Results |
|---|---|---|---|
| 1971 | Filmfare Award for Best Supporting Actor | Paras | Nominated |
| 1973 | Bengal Film Journalists' Association Awards – Best Supporting Actor | Tanhai | Won |
| 1974 | Filmfare Award for Best Supporting Actor | Dost | Nominated |
| 1979 | Filmfare Award for Best Supporting Actor | Kaala Pathar | Nominated |
| 1980 | Filmfare Award for Best Actor | Dostana | Nominated |
| 2003 | Stardust Awards for "Pride of the Film Industry" | N/A | Won |
| 2003 | Stardust Award for Lifetime Achievement | N/A | Won |
| 2007 | National Kishore Kumar Samman | N/A | Won |
| 2011 | Zee Cine Award for Lifetime Achievement | N/A | Won |
| 2011 | "The ITA Scroll of Honour" KBC regional at the Indian Television Academy Awards | N/A | Won |
| 2014 | IIFA Awards for Outstanding Contribution to Indian Cinema | N/A | Won |
| 2017 | Filmfare Lifetime Achievement Award | N/A | Won |

== Filmography ==
Playback singer:

- Dost (1974) (uncredited)
- Jwalamukhi (1980)
- Naram Garam (1981)

== See also ==
- List of politicians from Bihar

Lok Sabha
| Preceded by Constituency did not exist | Member of Parliament for Patna Sahib; 2009 – 2019 | Succeeded by Ravi Shankar Prasad |
| Preceded by Babul Supriyo | Member of Parliament for Asansol; 2022 – Present | Incumbent |
Political offices
| Preceded by C. P. Thakur | Minister of Health and Family Welfare; 1 July 2002 - 29 January 2003 | Succeeded by Sushma Swaraj |
| Preceded by Ved Prakash Goyal | Minister of Shipping; 29 January 2003- 22 May 2004 | Succeeded by K. Chandrashekar Rao |
