= Miss India Worldwide 2010 =

- Date: March 27, 2010
- Venue: Durban, South Africa
- Entrants: 26
- Placements: 10
- Winner: Kajal Lutchminarain; South Africa

Miss India Worldwide 2010 was the 19th edition of the international beauty pageant. The final was held in Durban, South Africa on March 27, 2010. About 24 countries were represented in the pageant. Kajal Lutchminarain of South Africa was crowned as the winner at the end of the event.

== Notable participants in this pageant ==
- Priyanka Singha, American actress and activist
- Ruhi Chaturvedi, Indian television actress
- Niharica Raizada, Luxembourgish film actress
- Pallavi Sharda, Australian film and television actress
- Amin Dhillon, Canadian television host and media personality

== Results ==
Final result	Contestant
Miss India Worldwide 2010	South Africa – Kajal Lutchminarain
1st runner-up	United Kingdom – Niharica Raizada
2nd runner-up	Suriname – Cher Merchand
Top 5	New Zealand – Jumana Shakeer; United States – Priyanka Singha

=== Special awards ===
Award	Name	Country
Miss Beautiful Hair	Akanksha Nehra	Kenya
Miss Healthy Skin	Neelaveni Kathirtchelvan	Malaysia

== Delegate ==
- Australia – Pallavi Sharda
- Brazil – Sohum Bhatt
- Canada – Amin Dhillon
- Guyana – Lucria Rambalak
- India – Ruhi Chaturvedi
- Ireland – Namrata Udani
- Italy – Rucha Gawas
- Kenya – Akanksha Nehra
- Malaysia – Neelaveni Kathirtchelvan
- Mauritius – Not Known
- Nepal – Vatsala Sharma
- Netherlands – Vandana Biere
- New Zealand – Jumana Shakeer
- Qatar – Not Known
- South Africa – Kajal Lutchminarain
- Suriname – Cher Merchand
- Tanzania – Richa Adhia
- Trinidad – Not Known
- Uganda – Aparna Sharma
- United Kingdom – Niharica Raizada
- United States – Priyanka Singha
