= Amin Dhillon =

- Occupation: Media Personality
- Years active: 2011–present
- Website: www.amindhillon.com

Amin Dhillon is a Canadian on-air host, producer, podcaster, and emcee. She is a former Miss India Worldwide Canada.

== Early life ==
Amin Dhillon was born in Winnipeg, Manitoba, Canada to an immigrant family from Punjab, India. At the age of 3, Dhillon lost her father to cancer and since then has hosted various fundraising events in support of the Canadian Cancer Society. She graduated from the University of Manitoba, with a degree in commerce.

== Career ==
Prior to her media career, Dhillon was a former beauty queen becoming the first woman from Winnipeg to win the title of Miss India Worldwide Canada. She represented Canada at the Miss India Worldwide pageant, placing TOP 10 overall.

From 2011, she was the entertainment and news reporter of the Asian Television Network (ATN). Dhillon spent a decade covering national news and events for Canada's Indo-Canadian community.

She is also one of Canada's leading emcees for various cultural and community events Some of the high-profile events Dhillon has hosted include Markham South Asian Festival, Indo-Canadian Awards, Miss India Worldwide Canada pageant, Miss India Carrassauga pageant, Canada's largest India Day celebrations at Nathan Phillips Square and at Yonge and Dundas Square, Pam Am Games Globalfest, Mosaic Festival, Bollywood Monster Mashup, Vibrant Brampton, Diwali Gala, Global Gujarati Awards, Festival of South Asia, and the Indo-Canada Chamber of Commerce Awards.

In 2019, Dhillon launched her own podcast and digital series "In Conversation with Amin Dhillon". With a focus on promoting diversity and inclusion, the podcast has featured politicians, newsmakers, artists, and entrepreneurs with inspirational stories of success and achievement.

== Politics ==
In April 2021, Dhillon announced she would be seeking the federal Liberal nomination in Brampton Centre.

== Notable guests and interviews ==
=== Music ===
- Jaz Dhami
- Arjun
- Jonita Gandhi
- Aaman Trikha
- Satinder Sartaaj
- Parichay
- Rup Magon
- Neeti Mohan
- Raja Kumari
- Raghav
- Sunny Brown
- Jay Sean
- Chloe Flower
- Nikhita Gandhi
- Jatin Pandit
- Amaal Malik

=== Actors and actresses ===
- Pallavi Sharda
- Uppekha Jain

=== YouTube and reality TV stars ===
- Aparna Shewakramani from Indian Matchmaking
- Zaid Ali
- Priyanka and Poonam Shah
- Rupan Bal
- Siera Bearchell

=== Entrepreneurs ===
- Manny Kohli
- Dee Murthy
- Mani Jassal
- Lisa Sohanpal
- Ritu Bhasin
- Samra Zafar
- Roxy Earle
- Rakhi Mutta

=== Athletes and politicians ===
- Tiger Ali Singh
- Patrick Brown
