= Miss India Worldwide 2008 =

- Date: February 23, 2008
- Venue: Johannesburg, South Africa
- Entrants: 20
- Placements: 10
- Winner: Shagun Sarabhai; India
- Congeniality: Cassandra Fernandez; Australia
- Photogenic: Richa Gangopadhyay; United States

Miss India Worldwide 2008 was the 17th edition of the international beauty pageant. The final was held in Johannesburg, South Africa on February 23, 2008. About 20 countries were represented in the pageant. Shagun Sarabhai of India was crowned as the winner at the end of the event.

== Results ==
Final result	Contestant
Miss India Worldwide 2008	India – Shagun Sarabhai
1st runner-up	Canada – Uppekha Jain
2nd runner-up	South Africa – Sabeeha Husain
Top 5	Netherlands – Suraya Baboeram Pandaij; Suriname – Vanita Singh

=== Special awards ===
Award	Name	Country
Miss Photogenic	Richa Gangopadhyay	USA
Miss Congeniality	Cassandra Fernandez	Australia
Best Talent	Suraya Baboeram Pandaij	Netherlands
Miss Beautiful Eyes	Richa Gangopadhyay	USA
Miss Beautiful Hair	Laila Ryan	Ireland
Most Beautiful Smile	Uppekha Jain	Canada
Most Beautiful Skin	Sahira Binte Rashim	Singapore

== Delegates ==
- Australia – Cassandra Fernandez
- Canada – Uppekha Jain
- Fiji – Ashley Singh
- France – Divya Ranganathan
- India – Shagun Sarabhai
- Ireland – Laila Ryan
- Jamaica – Racquel Baghaloo
- Lesotho – Zohra Adam
- Malawi – Aisha Tayub
- Mauritius – Sarina Sookeea
- Namibia – Rashi Singh
- Netherlands – Suraya Baboeram Pandaij
- New Zealand – Uttara Iyer
- Singapore – Sahira Binte Rashim
- South Africa – Sabeeha Husain
- Sri Lanka – Dasuni Chathurika
- Suriname – Vanita Singh
- Trinidad – Leanna Chadee
- United Kingdom – Suma Bhattacharya
- United States – Richa Gangopadhyay
