= Jyoti Singh =

Jyoti Singh may refer to

- Jyoti Singh (actress)
- Jyoti Singh (field hockey), Indian field hockey defender
- Jyoti Singh, victim of the 2012 Delhi gang rape and murder
- Jyoty, Indian-Dutch DJ, Producer and Radio host also known as Jyoty Singh

== See also ==
- Jyot Singh
