= Aadrika =

Indian-Malayalam film (2025)

- Directed by: Abhijit Adhya
- Written by: Vinod Narayanan
- Produced by: The Garage House Production
- Starring: Donovan T. Wodehouse, Niharica Raizada, Ajumalna Azad
- Cinematography: Jayakumar Thangavel
- Music by: Sarthak Kalyani
- Production companies: The Garage House, Uniiq Films, Raizada Entertainments
- Release date: 9 May 2025
- Running time: 143 minutes
- Country: India
- Language: Malayalam

Aadrika is a 2025 Indian Malayalam-language thriller film directed by Abhijit Adhya. The film stars Niharica Raizada in the titular role, alongside Donovan T. Wodehouse and Ajumalna Azad. The storyline follows a pregnant woman who returns to her ancestral home, only to experience a series of mysterious and supernatural occurrences.

== Cast ==
- Donovan T. Wodehouse
- Niharica Raizada
- Ajumalna Azad

== Production ==
The film is produced by The Garage House in collaboration with Uniiq Films and Raizada Entertainments. Principal photography took place across various locations in Kerala, with Jayakumar Thangavel serving as the Director of Photography. The film integrates elements of suspense, supernatural horror, and dark comedy, making it a distinctive addition to the Malayalam film industry.

== Trailer and Promotions ==
The official trailer for Aadrika premiered at the 77th Cannes Film Festival in 2024, where it received significant attention from critics and audiences. The first-look poster was also unveiled at Cannes 2024, generating anticipation ahead of its release.

== Release ==
Aadrika was released theatrically on 9 May 2025.
