= Miss India Worldwide 1995 =

- Venue: New York City, New York, United States
- Winner: Nirupama Anand; Hong Kong

Miss India Worldwide 1995 was the fifth edition of the international female pageant. The final was held in New York City, New York, United States. Total number of contestants were not known. Nirupama Anand of Hong Kong crowned as winner at the end of the event.

== Delegates ==
- Canada – Stephanie Lushington
- Hong Kong – Nirupama Anand
- South Africa – Nita Kanjee
