= Miss India Worldwide 2005 =

- Date: January 9, 2005
- Venue: Mumbai, India
- Entrants: 16
- Placements: 10
- Winner: Amrita Hunjan; United Kingdom
- Congeniality: Thebashini Jega Jeevan; Singapore
- Photogenic: Reshma van der Vliet; Netherlands

Miss India Worldwide 2005 was the 14th edition of the international beauty pageant. The final was held in Mumbai, India on January 9, 2005. About 16 countries were represented in the pageant. Amrita Hunjan of the United Kingdom was crowned as the winner at the end of the event.

== Results ==
Final result	Contestant
Miss India Worldwide 2006	United Kingdom – Amrita Hunjan
1st runner-up	Netherlands – Reshma van der Vliet
2nd runner-up	Singapore – Thebashini Jega Jeevan
Top 5	Australia – Vimala Raman; United Arab Emirates – Madhuvanthi Ramakrishnan

=== Special awards ===
Award	Name	Country
Miss Photogenic	Reshma van der Vliet	Netherlands
Miss Congeniality	Thebashini Jega Jeevan	Singapore
Best Talent	Amrita Hunjan	United Kingdom
Miss Beautiful Eyes	Lakshmi Mohan	Germany
Miss Beautiful Hair	Amrita Hunjan	United Kingdom
Most Beautiful Smile	Madhuvanthi Ramakrishnan	United Arab Emirates
Most Beautiful Skin	Zulfiya Merchant	Portugal

== Delegates ==
- Australia – Vimala Raman
- Canada – Simranjit Singh
- France – Anusha Cherer
- Germany – Lakshmi Mohan
- Hong Kong – Shalani Mirchandani
- India – Anchal Dwivedi
- Indonesia – Bhavna Tolani
- Netherlands – Reshma van der Vliet
- Oman – Rajini Sathyamurth
- Portugal – Zulfiya Merchant
- Singapore – Thebashini Jega Jeevan
- South Africa – Suraya Naidoo
- Trinidad – Lisa Dookie
- United Arab Emirates – Madhuvanthi Ramakrishnan
- United Kingdom – Amrita Hunjan
- United States – Reshoo Pande
