= Miss India Worldwide 2015 =

- Date: September 05, 2015
- Presenters: Karan Tacker
- Venue: Lalit Hotel, Mumbai, India
- Broadcaster: Emirates Vision
- Entrants: 32
- Winner: Stephanie Lohale; Oman
- Congeniality: Soesoe Mustafa; Netherlands
- Photogenic: Priyanka Sebastian; Sri Lanka

Miss India Worldwide 2015 was the 24th edition of the Miss India Worldwide pageant, held on 5 September 2015. The event was held at Lalit Hotel in Mumbai, India.

Monica Gill of the United States crowned her successor Stephanie Lohale of Oman at the end of the event.

== Results ==
Final result	Contestant
Miss India Worldwide 2015	Oman – Stephanie Lohale
1st Runner-up	India – Apeksha Porwell
2nd Runner-up	South Africa – Shivani Govender
Top 5	Qatar – Jyotsna Arora; United Arab Emirates – Nivetha Pethuraj

=== Special awards ===
Award	Name	Country
Miss Congeniality	Soesoe Mustafa	Netherlands
Miss Talented	Jyotsna Arora	Qatar
Miss Photogenic	Priyanka Sebastian	Sri Lanka
Miss Social Media	Dipti Bhudrani	Sint Maarten
Miss Beautiful Smile	Nandini Kochar	Botswana
Miss Beautiful Skin	Lieve Blanckaert	Guyana
Miss Catwalk	Apeksha Porwal	India
Miss Beautiful Eyes	Kareen Seepersaud	French Guiana
Miss Chairman's Professional	Veena Gurbani	Jamaica
Miss Bollywood Diva	Grace Walia	Indonesia

== Contestants ==
32 contestants competed for the title of Miss India Worldwide 2015.

Country/Territory	Candidate	Age	Hometown
Australia	Nibedita Pal	22	Brisbane
Bahrain	Ritu Pamnani	24	Dubai
Botswana	Nandini Kochar	17	Gaborone
Canada	Samantha Rodrigues	20	Toronto
Fiji	Monisha Gounder	17	Auckland
France	Chanda Rughoo		
French Guiana	Kareen Seepersaud	18	Cayenne
Guadeloupe	Trycia Ramaye		Grande-Terre
Guyana	Lieve Blanckaert	17	Georgetown
India	Apeksha Porwal	18	Mulund
Indonesia	Grace Walia	17	Jakarta
Italy	Natasha Jabul	20	Bari
Jamaica	Veena Gurbani	26	Michigan
Kenya	Aliza Rajan	24	Nairobi
Kuwait	Sharola Prasad	22	Dubai
Malaysia	Mogansundari Mahalingam		
Martinique	Nirmala Marimoutou	17	Fort-de-France
Mauritius	Lovna Peeharry	23	Rose-Belle
Netherlands	Soesoe Mustafa	26	Delft
New Zealand	Advaita Shetty	20	Auckland
Oman	Stephanie Lohale	19	Muscat
Qatar	Jyotsna Arora	23	Dubai
Russia	Ashita Munjely		Moscow
Singapore	Durga Naidu		Singapore
Sint Maarten	Dipti Budhrani	17	Cay Hill
South Africa	Shivani Govender	22	Johannesburg
Sri Lanka	Priyanka Sebastian		
Sweden	Sanaya Singh	24	Gävle
Switzerland	Kanika Jain		Zürich
Trinidad and Tobago	Melissa Hanoman		
United Arab Emirates	Nivetha Pethuraj	23	Dubai
United Kingdom	Nandini Patel		London
USA	Pranathy Gangaraju	19	Duluth

== Judges ==
The Miss India Worldwide 2015 final judges were:

- Richa Sharma
- Hrishitaa Bhatt
- Niharika Raizada
- Nikkitasha Marwah
- Sandeep Soparkar
- Raj Suri
- Alesia Raut

== Contestant notes ==
- Natasha Jabul, has Mauritian origins on her parents' side.
- Samantha Rodrigues, is born in Guyana.

== Crossovers ==
Contestants who previously competed at other national and international beauty pageants:

- Bahrain – Ritu Pamnani placed top 5 at Miss India United Arab Emirates 2015.
- India – Apeksha Porwal represented India at Miss Teen International 2009 in Chicago. She was Femina Miss India Delhi 2015 but she unplaced at Femina Miss India 2015. She has finished 2nd runner-up at Miss Diva 2017.
- Jamaica – Veena Gurbani was Miss South Asia USA 2014 and Miss India Global 2017.
- New Zealand – Advaita Shetty had competed at Miss Teen International New Zealand 2014 and placed 3rd runner-up. She has finished 1st runner-up at Miss India Worldwide New Zealand 2014.
- Russia- Dr. Ashita Munjely was Miss Himachal Face of The Year 2015. She was also crowned as Miss Himachal Runner up and Miss Himachal- Miss Style Diva 2015. She had also won Miss Tiara. She also won Miss SGMU 2018.
