= Mercy (2025 film) =

2025 Hindi-language film

- Directed by: Mitul Patel
- Written by: Mitul Patel
- Starring: Adil Hussain; Raj Vasudeva; Niharica Raizada
- Cinematography: Karthik Mallur
- Edited by: Sanjay Ingle
- Music by: Kingshuk Chakravarthy
- Production company: Everclear Films
- Release dates: 5 May 2025 (UK Asian Film Festival); 24 April 2026
- Country: India
- Language: Hindi

Mercy is a 2025 Hindi-language drama film directed by Mitul Patel. The film stars Adil Hussain, Raj Vasudeva and Niharica Raizada in lead roles.

The film is based on the subject of passive euthanasia and explores the emotional and ethical complexities surrounding end-of-life decisions.

== Plot ==
The film follows Shekhar on a silent Christmas Eve as he struggles with the agonizing decision of whether to end his mother's life.

== Cast ==
- Adil Hussain as Father Joel
- Raj Vasudeva as Shekhar
- Niharica Raizada as Jiya
- Aparna Ghoshal as Sujata
- Kunal Bhan as Vihaan
- Azinkya Mishra as
- Ajay Dutta as Doctor

== Production ==
The film marks the directorial debut of Mitul Patel and is produced by Ever Clear Films.

== Release ==
Mercy is scheduled to be released theatrically in India on 24 April 2026.

== Reception ==
The film has been shown at international film festivals including the UK Asian Film Festival and Indian Film Festival of Melbourne, where it received positive responses. Mercy also won Best International Feature Film at the 2025 London Independent Film Festival (LIFF) and won Best Actor and Best Debutante Director at the 18th Jaipur International Film Festival (JIFF) 2026.

Rahul Desai of The Hollywood Reporter India stated that it "lacks the artistic sensibilities to explore a complex subject". Nandini Ramnath of Scroll.in writes that "Mercy is one of those low-budget, Rotary Club-worthy films that is noteworthy only for its topicality. The bareness across the scripting, performance and production design departments doesn’t do justice to an important subject, especially in India."

Vinamra Mathur of Firstpost observe that "Mercy is a film that has its heart in the right place. But barring a couple of heartfelt moments and piercing dialogues, it does not have the kind of gravitas a film of such urgency needs." Vineeta Kumar of India Today gave 2 stars out of 5 and said that "The film takes on the difficult subject of passive euthanasia with sincerity, but struggles to translate its intent into a consistently engaging cinematic experience."
