= Alissa Anderegg =

American beauty pageant contestant (born 1994)

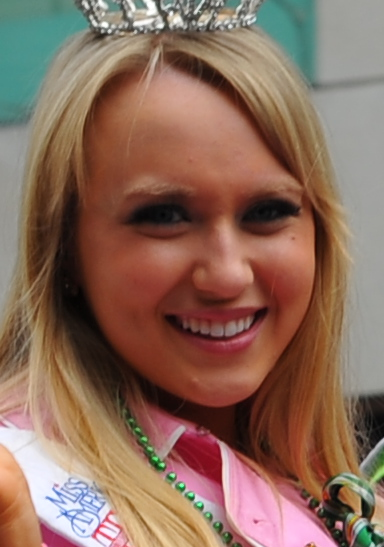
- Anderegg in 2012
- Born: April 8, 1994 (age 32); Danville, California, U.S.
- Education: Duke University; Northwestern University
- Height: 1.61 m (5 ft 3 1/2 in)
- Beauty pageant titleholder
- Title: Miss World America 2020
- Hair color: Blonde
- Eye color: Blue
- Major competitions: Miss World America 2020 (Winner)
- Website: www.alissaanderegg.com

Alissa Anderegg (born April 8, 1994) is an American beauty pageant titleholder and national Alzheimer's activist who was crowned as the winner of Miss World America 2020 to represent the United States in Miss World. Anderegg represented New York (state) in the national competition as Miss World New York.

== Early life ==
Anderegg was raised in Danville, California. As a child, she starred several professional theatrical productions - including the Los Angeles premiere of Parade, the world premiere of Night of the Hunter, and a three-year contract in the West Coast premiere of An American Girls Revue.

Anderegg graduated from Duke University in 2016. She went on to graduate with a Masters in Science from Northwestern University's Medill School of Journalism.

== Alzheimer's activism ==
Anderegg began advocating for Alzheimer's disease at age 11, in honor of her grandmother Mary Fran Anderegg who had the disease. She has been featured in the Emmy-winning HBO documentary The Alzheimer's Project, contributed an essay to The Shriver Report: A Woman’s Nation Takes on Alzheimer’s and Alzheimer's in America, served as a face of Maria Shriver's Women's Alzheimer's Movement national campaign, and more. In 2021, she partnered with CaringKind: The Heart of Alzheimer's Caregiving as an ambassador and joined the Board of Directors of the Youth Movement Against Alzheimer's.

== Pageantry ==
On 16 August 2020, Anderegg was awarded the title of Miss World America New York 2020, a preliminary to Miss World America 2020.

On 16 October 2020, Anderegg was crowned as Miss World America 2020, succeeding the outgoing Miss World America 2019 and Miss World 2019 Top 40 semifinalist, Emmy Rose Cuvelier. Due to the COVID-19 pandemic, the pageant was conducted virtually over the course of a month. Anderegg also won the Beauty with a Purpose Award.

Awards and achievements
Preceded by Emmy Rose Cuvelier	Miss World America; 2020	Succeeded by Shree Saini
