= Moods of Crime =

- Hindi: मूड्स ऑफ़ क्रॉइम
- Directed by: Sunil Shah
- Story by: Jasuraj
- Produced by: Sunil Shah
- Starring: Ayaz Ahmed; Anima Pagare; Uppekha Jain as Pooja Desai; Hemant Dedhia
- Cinematography: Anirudh Nakhare
- Edited by: Sunil Shah
- Music by: Jeetu Ramachandran
- Production company: Bhumii Creations
- Distributed by: Jai Viratra Entertainment Limited
- Release date: 5 August 2016
- Country: India
- Language: Hindi

Moods Of Crime (Hindi: मूड्स ऑफ़ क्रॉइम) is a 2016 Hindi crime thriller featuring Ayaz Ahmed, Anima Pagare and Upekha Jain. Directed, edited and produced by Sunil Shah, it was released on 5 August 2016.

== Synopsis ==
The story is based on the intricacies of the phenomenal capabilities of a human mind. The plot begins with an experiment on criminal psychology and intensifies as this experiment triggers a series of unprecedented crimes which are seemingly motiveless.

== Cast ==
- Ayaz Ahmed as Zubin Modi
- Anima Pagare as Nivedita Bhattacharya
- Uppekha Jain as Pooja Desai
- Hemant Dedhia
- Partho Das
- Nilima Kadhe
- Shyamal Ganguly
