= Miss New York World =

- Formation: 1951
- Type: Beauty pageant
- Headquarters: New York City
- Location: New York State
- Members: Miss World America (1951–present)
- Official language: English
- State Director: Shane Santacroce
- Website: Official Website

The Miss New York World competition is a beauty pageant that selects the representative for New York State in the Miss World America pageant.

The current Miss New York World is Ashley Wells of Long Island, NY. Wells was selected to become Miss New York World on July 17, 2023. The previous Miss New York World, Alissa Anderegg, was crowned Miss World America 2020 on October 16, 2020.

== Winners ==
Color key

- Declared as Winner/Ended as Miss World America
- Ended as runner-up
- Ended as one of the finalists or semifinalists
- Ended as special awards winner
- Ended as Miss USA

Year	Name	Hometown	Age (Note: Age at the time of the Miss World America pageant)	Placement at Miss World America	Special awards at Miss World America	Notes
2023	Ashley Wells	Westbury, Long Island	26	Top 20	Top 10 Beauty with a Purpose Winner, Top 5 Talent	Previously Miss Black Washington USA 2023
2022	No Representative					
2021	No Representative					
2020	Alissa Anderegg	New York City	26	Miss World America 2020	Beauty with a Purpose Winner, Top 10 Talent, Top 10 Beautiful Me	
2019	Kiana Gonzalez	New York City	24	Top 10		
2018	Did not compete					
2017	Abena Appiah	New York City	24	Top 16		Previously Top Model Ghana 2013 and Miss Universe Ghana 2014. Later Miss Earth Ghana 2019 and Top 20 semi-finalist at Miss Earth 2019. Later Miss Grand USA 2020 and Miss Grand International 2020.
2017	Marjana Chowdhury	New York City	23	Top 16		Previously Miss Bangladesh USA 2016; Later Miss Asia-Pacific Bangladesh 2017 and Top 20 semi-finalist at Miss Asia Pacific International 2018. Later Miss Alaska World 2019 and top 25 semi-finalist at Miss World America 2019.
2017	Leila Kraja	New York City	24			
2017	Michaela Rose Kenny	Geneva	23			Previously Miss New York World 2016 and was supposed to compete at Miss World America 2016 but withdrew before the finals.
2017	Razana Angel	New York City	26			
2016	Michaela Rose Kenny	Geneva	22	Did not compete		Withdrew before the finals.
2015	Katherine Cooksey	New York City	25	Top 22		
Miss New York United States 2014
2014	Julia La Roche					
Miss New York World
2013	No titleholders as Miss World America was designated from 2006 to 2013.					
2012	No titleholders as Miss World America was designated from 2006 to 2013.					
2011	No titleholders as Miss World America was designated from 2006 to 2013.					
2010	No titleholders as Miss World America was designated from 2006 to 2013.					
2009	No titleholders as Miss World America was designated from 2006 to 2013.					
2008	No titleholders as Miss World America was designated from 2006 to 2013.					
2007	No titleholders as Miss World America was designated from 2006 to 2013.					
2006	No titleholders as Miss World America was designated from 2006 to 2013.					
2005	No known representatives from New York between 2003 and 2005.					
2004	No known representatives from New York between 2003 and 2005.					
2003	No known representatives from New York between 2003 and 2005.					
2002	No titleholders as Miss World America was designated from 1995 to 2002.					
2001	No titleholders as Miss World America was designated from 1995 to 2002.					
2000	No titleholders as Miss World America was designated from 1995 to 2002.					
1999	No titleholders as Miss World America was designated from 1995 to 2002.					
1998	No titleholders as Miss World America was designated from 1995 to 2002.					
1997	No titleholders as Miss World America was designated from 1995 to 2002.					
1996	No titleholders as Miss World America was designated from 1995 to 2002.					
1995	No titleholders as Miss World America was designated from 1995 to 2002.					
1994	Fionna Kennedy					
1993	Renne Robertson					
1992	Heather Quarles			Top 10		
Miss New York USA 1981-1991
1991	Maureen Murray	New York City	24	Top 11		Previously Miss New Hampshire Teen USA 1983
1990	Patricia Murphy	Pearl River				
1989	Jennifer Fisher	Rochester				
1988	Linnea Mancini	Carmel	24			Went on to become the Pageant Director for The CW reality show Crowned: The Mother of All Pageants
1987	Constance McCullough	New York City				
1986	Beth Laufer	West Islip				
1985	Lovey King	Yonkers				
1984	Caroline Flury	West Seneca				Miss Oktoberfest 1983 as Miss Buffalo
1983	Jennifer Mikelinich	Huntington		Top 12		
1982	Annemarie Henderson	Monroe				
1981	Deborah Fountain	Bronx				Previously Miss North Carolina World 1979 and Top 8 finalist in Miss World America 1979. Was not allowed to compete at Miss USA after she was caught padding her swimsuit during the preliminary competition.
Miss New York World
1980	Patty Blanchfield					
1979	Shelly Broadwell					
1978	Kathleen Peartree			Top 8		
1977	Kathleen Downey					
1976	Anneliese Ettrich					
1975	Hildegard Holig					
1974	Debra Ann Purritano					
1973	Vanessa J. Santo					
1972	Michelle Renee Franqui				Miss Congeniality	
1971	Susan Elizabeth Dishaw			Top 7		
1970	Peggy Molitor					
1969	Gloria E. Graham					
1968	Eve Ramirez					
1967	Patricia Louise McKeegan					Competed as New York State.
1967	Madeline Young	New York City		Top 15		Competed as New York City, New York.
1967	Nancy Jo Brossman					Competed as Long Island, New York.
1966	Sherry Lyn Armbruster					Competed as New York State.
1966	Carol Collins	New York City				Competed as New York City, New York.
1966	Linda Cumbo	Brooklyn				Competed as Brooklyn, New York.
1965	Dorothy Langhans	Wantagh		4th Runner-up		Competed as New York State. Previously Miss New York USA 1964 and Top 15 semi-finalist at Miss USA 1964
1965	Maureen Nichols	New York City				Competed as New York City, New York.
1965	Priscilla Mullin					Competed as Long Island, New York.
1964	Jeanne Marie Quinn	East Meadow	20	Miss USA World 1964		Competed as New York State. Top 16 semi-finalist at Miss World 1964. Previously Miss New York USA 1963 and top 15 semi-finalist at Miss USA 1963. Previously Miss New York American Beauty 1964 (Miss New York U.S. International 1964) and 1st Runner-up at Miss American Beauty 1964 (Miss U.S. International 1964)
1964	Ruth Stein	New York City		Top 7		Competed as New York City, New York.
1963	Elyse K. Mars					Competed as New York State.
1963	Michele Bettina Metrinko	New York City; Washington, D.C.	18	Miss USA World 1963		Competed as New York City, New York. Top 14 semi-finalist Miss World 1963. Previously Miss District of Columbia USA 1963 and 1st Runner-up at Miss USA 1963. Her sister Marsha Metrinko also competed at Miss USA 1963 as Miss Maryland and in Miss America 1963 as Miss New York City. Candidate for the Republican nomination in the 2010 U.S. House of Rep. election in Delaware for Delaware's at-large congressional district under her married name Michele Rollins.
1962	Pat Franklin			2nd Runner-up		Competed as New York State.
1962	Mimi Miller	New York City				Competed as New York City, New York.
1961	Janet Boring	Williston Park	18	1st Runner-up		Competed as New York State.
1961	Marilyn Chase	New York City				Competed as New York City, New York.
1960	Arlene Nesbitt					Competed as New York State.
1960	Annette Driggers	New York City; Freeport	15	Miss United States World 1960 (dethroned)		Competed as New York City, New York. Driggers was later dethroned, 15 days into her reign, after being disqualified from the Miss World Competition for being underage after being caught lying about her age when it was found out that she was actually 15 years old instead of 20 like she had said earlier. She also had been married a year prior to her reign but it didn't last long.
1959	No known representatives from New York in 1959.					
1958	Nancy Anne Corcoran	New York City	23	Miss United States World 1958		Unplaced at Miss World 1958.
Miss New York USA 1953-1957
1957	Sanita Pelkey	New York City		Top 15		
1956	Kay Douglas	New York City				
1955	Janet Kadlecik	New York City		Top 15		
1955	Patricia O'Kane	New York City		Top 15		She represented New York City and finished in the Top 15.
1954	Karin Hultman	New York City; Brighton		Miss World USA 1954		Later Miss World USA 1954 after original winner was dethroned; 1st Runner-up at Miss World 1954
1954	Renee Roy	New York City		2nd Runner-up		She represented New York City and finished as 3rd Runner-up, but later 2nd Runner-up after the original 2nd moved one place up taking the place of the 1st Runner-up
1953	Reta Knapp	New York City		Top 20		
Miss New York World
1952	Tally Richards	New York City	24	Miss World United States 1952		4th Runner-up at Miss World 1952.
1951	No known representatives from New York in 1951.					

Notes to table
