= Miss India Worldwide 1990 =

- Winner: Simi Chaddha; United States

Miss India Worldwide 1990 was the first edition of the international female pageant. The total number of contestants is not known. Simi Chaddha of the United States was crowned as winner at the end of the event.
