= Miss India Worldwide 1992 =

- Winner: Icha Singh; United States

Miss India Worldwide 1992 was the third edition of the international female pageant. Total number of contestants were not known. Icha Singh of United States crowned as winner at the end of the event.

== Delegates ==
- Canada – Komal Sahni
- South Africa – Manjul Baharie
- United States – Icha Singh
