= Miss India Worldwide 1998 =

- Date: December 3, 1998
- Venue: Singapore
- Entrants: 18
- Placements: 10
- Winner: Melissa Bhagat; Canada
- Congeniality: Reshma Sharina Tewarles; Netherlands
- Photogenic: Leena Ramphul; Mauritius

Miss India Worldwide 1998 was the eighth edition of the international beauty pageant. The final was held in Singapore, December 3, 1998. About 18 countries were represented in the pageant. Melissa Bhagat of Canada was crowned as winner at the end of the event.

== Results ==
Final result	Contestant
Miss India Worldwide 1998	Canada – Melissa Bhagat
1st runner-up	Singapore – Ssunita Laximi Rai
2nd runner-up	Netherlands – Reshma Sharina Tewarles
Top 5	Malaysia – Kathleen Cyril; United States – Nileem Shah
Top 10	Hong Kong – Sonisha Kirpalani; Mauritius – Leena Ramphul; South Africa – Sunitha Singh; Suriname – Shamla Mathoera; Trinidad – Somatie Natacha Persad

=== Special awards ===
Award	Name	Country
Miss Photogenic	Leena Ramphul	Mauritius
Miss Congeniality	Reshma Sharina Tewarles	Netherlands
Best Talent	Kathleen Cyril	Malaysia
Miss Beautiful Eyes	Sonisha Kirpalani	Hong Kong
Miss Beautiful Hair	Unknown	
Most Beautiful Smile	Unknown	
Most Beautiful Skin	Unknown	
Miss Elegance	Ssunita Laximi Rai	Singapore
Miss Personality	Melissa Bhagat	Canada

== Delegates ==
- Canada – Melissa Bhagat
- Denmark – Pinky Harwani
- Hong Kong – Sonisha Kirpalani
- India – Himani Isar
- Indonesia – Shanti Tolani
- Malaysia – Kathleen Cyril
- Mauritius – Leena Ramphul
- Nepal – Gogi Ishani
- Netherlands – Reshma Sharina Tewarles
- Philippines – Sureen Bhagawandas
- Singapore – Ssunita Laximi Rai
- South Africa – Sunitha Singh
- Suriname – Shamla Mathoera
- Trinidad – Somatie Natacha Persad
- Thailand – Shital Tolani
- United Kingdom – Sharon Jutla
- United States – Nileem Shah
- Zimbabwe – Jeshmeen Kanjee
