= Niharica Raizada =

Luxembourgish actress

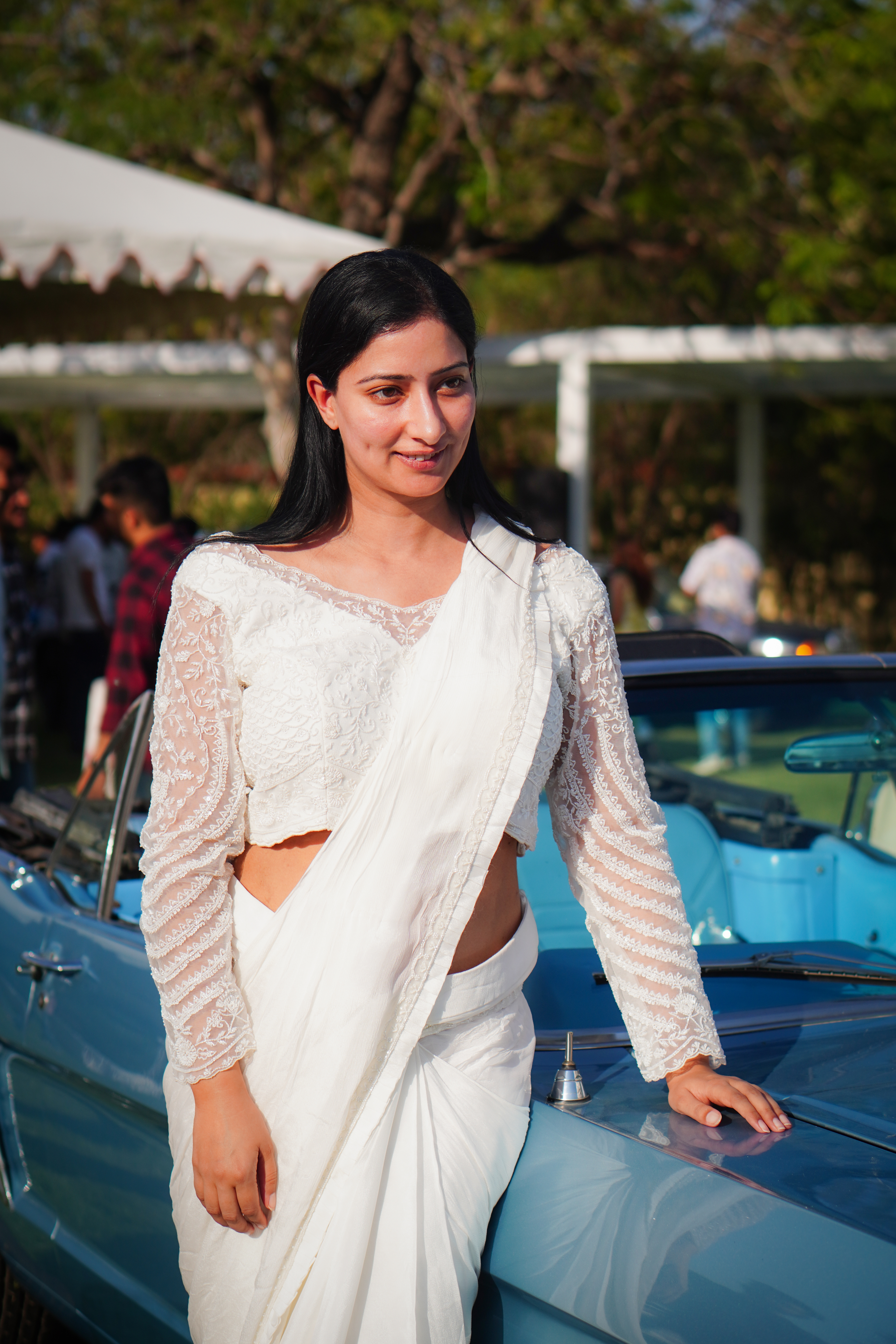
- Born: Niharica Kumari Raizada; 18 April 1990 (age 36); Luxembourg
- Education: Johns Hopkins University; Imperial College; New York Film Academy
- Occupation: Actress
- Years active: 2013–present
- Title: Miss India UK 2010; Runner up–Miss India Worldwide 2010
- Family: O. P. Nayyar (grandfather)

Niharica Raizada (born 18 April 1990) is a Luxembourgish actress. She was crowned as Miss India UK 2010 and was runner-up at Miss India Worldwide 2010. She is the granddaughter of former Bollywood musician O. P. Nayyar. She has worked in films like IB71, Masaan, 6-5=2, Damadol, Total Dhamaal (2018) and Sooryavanshi (2021).

== Early life ==
Niharica is the granddaughter of music composer O. P. Nayyar. She was born to Indian parents and was raised in Luxembourg. Her mother tongue is French and she also speaks Luxembourgish, German, English, Spanish, and Hindi. She has a sister Nirekhna Raizada and a brother Avneesh Raizada. She is a Medical Scientist by qualification and studied MRes in Translational Medicine at Imperial College London, and then did research in Cardiology at Johns Hopkins University (Baltimore), under a Fulbright scholarship. She got training in acting from New York Film Academy. She is trained in Indian classical music and ballet. Niharica was crowned Miss India UK 2010 and was also the first runner-up of Miss India Worldwide 2010. Niharica released one song for the brand Chambor in French. She was ranked 45 in the list of Times 50 Most Desirable Women of 2013, and rose to 44 in 2015.

Niharica made her film debut in a Bengali film Damadol in 2013. She acted in a Gujarati film Var to NRI J in 2016. Niharica has done a film titled Full 2 Jugaadu in 2016 with Krushna Abhishek.

She is the honorary cultural and arts ambassador between the Grand Duchy of Luxembourg and the Republic of India.

Niharica Raizada as a jury member at the Miss Universe India 2025 Grand Finale, held at Zee Studios, Jaipur, on 18 August 2025.

== Filmography ==
=== Films ===
Year	Film	Role	Notes
2013	Damadol	Dancer	Bengali film
2014	6-5=2	Priya	
2015	Masaan	Traveller Girl	
2015	Alone	Anu	
2015	Baby	Reporter	
2015	Ek Kali		Short film
2016	Waarrior Savitri	Savitri	
2016	Var to NRI J	Tejasvini	Gujarati film
2017	Dwaraka		Telugu film; Special appearance in the song "Allabi Allabi"
2019	The Perfect Murder	Carol	Short film
2019	Total Dhamaal	Dream Girl	
2021	Sooryavanshi	Inspector Tara Manchandani	
2021	Himbeeren mit Senf	Junge Ehefrau	German film
2023	IB71	Air Hostess	
2024	Janma Runn		Marathi film
2025	Aadrika		Malayalam film
2026	Mercy	Jiya	

=== Web series ===
Year	Web Series	Role	Language	Notes
2019	Asli Mard	Mia Gupta	Hindi	
2021	Coyotes		French	
