= Miss India Worldwide 2009 =

- Date: February 14, 2009
- Venue: Durban, South Africa
- Entrants: 20
- Placements: 10
- Winner: Nikkitasha Marhawa; United States
- Photogenic: Shruti Dilip; Oman

Miss India Worldwide 2009 was the 18th edition of the international beauty pageant. The final was held in Durban, South Africa on February 14, 2009. About 20 countries were represented in the pageant. Nikkitasha Marhawa of the United States was crowned as the winner at the end of the event.

== Results ==
Final result	Contestant
Miss India Worldwide 2009	United States – Nikkitasha Marhawa
1st runner-up	Australia – Kanchan Verma
2nd runner-up	Netherlands – Sunaina Nadiya Bhoendie
Top 5	United Arab Emirates – Rashmi Premaney; Suriname – Pamela Mangroelal

=== Special awards ===
Award	Name	Country
Miss Photogenic	Shruti Dilip	Oman
Miss Beautiful Hair	Padmini Renata Rambalak	Guyana
Most Beautiful Smile	Sunaina Nadiya Bhoendie	Netherlands

== Delegates ==
- Australia – Kanchan Verma
- Bahrain – Jenai Kavarana
- Canada – Gauravi Shah
- Fiji – Naziah Ali
- Guyana – Padmini Renata Rambalak
- India – Deepthi Mary Varughese
- Ireland – Habreen Kaur
- Kenya – Melissa De Blok
- Malawi – Avanthi Patel
- Netherlands – Sunaina Nadiya Bhoendie
- New Zealand – Jannat Kaur
- Oman – Shruti Dilip
- Qatar – Kubbra Sait
- Singapore – Asmaa Pandit
- South Africa – Kasrivia Nagesar
- Suriname – Pamela Mangroelal
- Uganda – Gurpreet Kaur
- United Arab Emirates – Rashmi Premaney
- United Kingdom – Poonam Mehmi
- United States – Nikkitasha Marhawa
