= Miss India Worldwide 2016 =

- Date: October 8, 2017
- Presenters: Manav Gohil, Anuradha Maharaj
- Venue: Royal Albert’s Palace, Fords, New Jersey, USA
- Broadcaster: TV Asia
- Winner: Karina Kohli; United States
- Congeniality: Neha Gidwani; Sint Maarten
- Photogenic: Unknown (Brittany Singh, Dethroned)

Miss India Worldwide 2016 was the 25th edition of the Miss India Worldwide pageant, held on 8 October 2017. The event was held at Royal Albert’s Palace in New Jersey, United States.

Stephanie Lohale of Oman crowned her successor Karina Kohli of the United States at the end of the event.

The show was hosted by Indian actor Manav Gohil and Miss India Trinidad & Tobago, Anuradha Maharaj.

== Results ==
Final result	Contestant
Miss India Worldwide 2016	United States - Karina Kohli
1st runner-up	South Africa - Krsna Priya Dasa
2nd runner-up	Aruba - Karishma Malhotra
Top 5	France – Stephanie Madavane; Sri Lanka - Lankika Mathotaarachchi
Top 10	Canada – Zooni Thusoo; Guyana – Brittany Singh

=== Special awards ===
Award	Name	Country
Miss Congeniality	Neha Gidwani	Sint Maarten
Miss Photogenic	Brittany Singh	Guyana
Miss Beautiful Skin	Zooni Thusoo	Canada
Miss Beautiful Smile	Alisha Nanden	Netherlands
Miss Bollywood Diva	Lankika Mathotaarachchi	Sri Lanka

== Contestants ==
40 contestants competed for the title of Miss India Worldwide 2016.

- Aruba – Karishma Malhotra
- Australia – Sukhmani khaira
- Canada – Zooni Thusoo
- Fiji – Ashwani Maharaj
- France – Setphanie Madavane
- French Guiana – Mayeline Estevez
- Guadeloupe – Indirah Mekel
- Guyana – Brittany Singh
- India – Akila Narayanan
- Italy – Basanti Tak
- Kenya – Finali Galaiya
- Laos – Nassima Mohamed
- Martinique – Anne Sophie Herard
- Mauritius – Jaleela Hassennally
- Netherlands – Alisha Nanden
- New Zealand – Pooja Bhagath
- Scotland – Kamilah Afaq
- Sint Maarten – Neha Gidwani
- South Africa – Krsna Priya Dasa
- Sweden – Namita Arora
- Sri Lanka – Lankika Mathotaarachchi
- Switzerland – Veena Tanner
- Trinidad and Tobago – Martina Mahase
- United Arab Emirates – Sukanya Sudhakaran
- United Kingdom – Jamini Patel
- United States – Karina Kohli

== Crossovers ==
Contestants who previously competed or will compete at other beauty pageants:

- India – Akila Narayan has finished 1st runner-up at Miss India Teen New England 2015 and Miss Teen India USA 2015. She had completed at Miss India USA 2015 and Miss South India 2017.
- Kenya – Finali Galaiya, Miss India Wordwilde Kenya, won the title of Miss Attitude East Africa 2016 in Nairobi, Kenya.
- Mauritius – Jaleela Hassennally, Miss India Worldwide Mauritius, has been conferred the title of Miss Humanity Hope 2016 by Cancer Association of Mauritius (CANMA).
- South Africa – Krsna Priya Dasa, Miss India South Africa, was previously Miss India South Africa KwaZulu-Natal 2015.
- Sweden – Namita Arora won the title of Miss India Europe 2014 in Barcelona, Spain.
- United Arab Emirates – Sukanya Sudhakaran, Miss India UAE, won the award of Miss Photogenic at Miss Kerala 2014.
