= Miss India Worldwide 1994 =

- Date: July 30, 1994
- Venue: New York City, New York, United States
- Winner: Karminder Kaur Virk; India

Miss India Worldwide 1994 was the fourth edition of the beauty pageant with contestants from India and from among the Indian diaspora. The final was held in New York City, New York, United States on July 30, 1994. Total number of contestants is not listed. Karminder Kaur Virk of India was crowned the winner at the end of the event.

== Results ==
Final result	Contestant
Miss India Worldwide 1994	India – Karminder Kaur Virk
1st runner-up	South Africa – Dennis Dass
2nd runner-up	United States – Ratna Kancherla

== Delegates ==
- Canada – Gita Bali
- India – Karminder Kaur Virk
- South Africa – Dennis Dass
- United States – Ratna Kancherla
