= Samra Zafar =

Pakistani-Canadian human rights activist

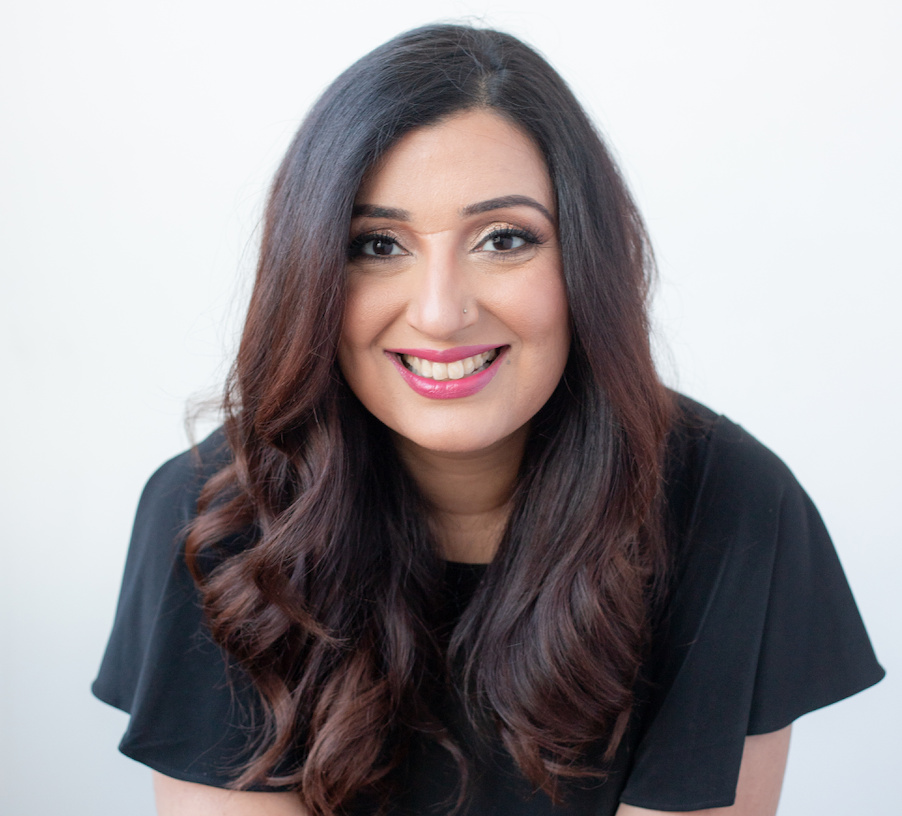
- Born: 19 April 1982 (age 44); Pakistan
- Education: University of Toronto (HBSc, MA)
- Organization: Brave Beginnings
- Known for: Women's rights advocacy, human rights advocacy, domestic violence victim support
- Notable work: A Good Wife: Escaping the Life I never Chose, Toronto Life article, TED Talks
- Website: samrazafar.com

Samra Zafar is a human rights advocate, speaker and writer, whose story of being a teen bride and survivor of domestic abuse became a bestselling memoir, "A Good Wife: Escaping the Life I Never Chose".

== Family and early life ==
Zafar was born in Pakistan and grew up in Abu Dhabi in the United Arab Emirates,(UAE).

Her father, while supportive of Zafar wanting to get an education, was abusive to his wife. At the age of sixteen, Zafar was engaged to be married to a friend of the family's brother, who lived in Canada and who was eleven years her senior. She was not happy with the idea until she was assured by her future husband and his family that she would be able to continue her education and go to university in Canada. The arranged marriage was held when Zafar was seventeen. After the marriage, her husband began the paperwork to bring her to Canada, and a year later Zafar joined her husband in Ontario.

A month after her arrival in Canada, she realized she was pregnant with her first daughter. When her in-laws moved in with the couple, Zafar realized that their promises of continuing her education had been a lie. Five years later, she gave birth to a second daughter. For many years she was not permitted to go out of the house alone, have her own friends, or have any independence. She was advised by her husband and his parents that her destiny was to be a mother and a wife.

She stayed in the marriage for 12 years, enduring both physical and emotional abuse, while living with her husband and, intermittently, his parents.

“… I was humiliated and assaulted and insulted everyday. I started believing that… it was all my fault and that I was not good enough.”

— Samra Zafar, Global News

Zafar left the marriage when she was 26.

== Book ==
Zafar was asked to share her story with a journalist who wrote for the Express Tribune, an online Pakistani newspaper. In 2013, she agreed and was surprised with the number of people who reached out to her after the article was published. Zafar started being asked to speak at events and in 2017 she wrote a personal essay for Toronto Life magazine that became the top long-form article of the year. The article attracted the attention of publishers which lead HarperCollins to print her memoir called A Good Wife: Escaping the Life I Never Chose. The book was written with Meg Masters, a Toronto editor and the cover of the book features a photograph of Zafar from her wedding day.

The book was named as one of the Canadian Broadcasting Corporation's 2019 best non-fiction books of the year and was listed as a top ten book to read in 2019 by Angela Haupt in the Washington Post. In 2020, it was listed by the CBC as one of 21 books, by Canadian women, to read now.

The book has appeared on the bestseller lists of the Globe and Mail and the CBC and has been optioned to be adapted to a TV series by Pier 21 films.

== University ==
By earning money from a home daycare, which she was permitted to do only because the family was having financial difficulties, Zafar was able to save enough money to attend the University of Toronto Mississauga after eight years of marriage. With the support of professors, students, a social worker and counsellors, she left her husband and lived on campus supporting herself and daughters by working at the university and selling butter chicken to students.

She received 17 academic awards and scholarships, including the John H Moss Scholar award, which is awarded to the most outstanding student graduating from all three University of Toronto campuses.

Zafar went on to receive a master's degree in economics.

Since 2016, Zafar has held the position of an Alumni Governor for the University of Toronto, an elected position.

As of 2021, Zafar is a medical student at the Micheal G. DeGroote School of Medicine at McMaster University and will be a part of the 2024 graduating cohort.

== Activism ==
Zafar has presented at three TED Talks, one of which was "...named an all-time top 10 talk on gender-based violence..."

She has been asked to speak at events such as at the Canadian Federation of University Women Etobicoke's sixth annual Valentine's Stop the Violence breakfast and the University of Regina's Inspiring Leadership Forum.

In 2019, Zafar became an Ambassador for Plan International Canada.

=== Non-profit ===
Zafar founded a not-for-profit organization called Brave Beginnings to help abuse victims rebuild their lives.

== Awards and recognition ==
In 2019, Zafar was recognized as one of the Top 100 Most Powerful Women in Canada by the Women's Executive Network and was a winner of Canada's Top 25 Immigrants.

In May 2021, Zafar was named the Desmond Parker Outstanding Young Alumni Award winner at the University of Toronto, which is given to past students who demonstrate excellence in community service and professional accomplishments.

== Personal life ==
Zafar lives in Toronto, downtown with her two daughters.. She had a career in banking.. She is currently pursuing medical school as of fall 2021.
