= Miss India Worldwide 2002 =

- Date: November 2, 2002
- Venue: Durban, South Africa
- Entrants: 25
- Placements: 10
- Winner: Santripti Vellody; Dubai
- Congeniality: Rohini Banjeree; India

Miss India Worldwide 2002 was the 12th edition of the international beauty pageant. The final was held in Durban, South Africa on November 2, 2002. About 25 countries were represented in the pageant. Santripti Vellody of Dubai was crowned as the winner at the end of the event.

== Results ==
Final result	Contestant
Miss India Worldwide 2002	Dubai – Santripti Vellody
1st runner-up	India – Rohini Banjeree
2nd runner-up	United States – Priya Arora
3rd runner-up	Singapore – Gayathri Unnikrishnan
Top 11	Australia – Lalenya Brown; Canada – Kiran Shergrill; France – Nidhya Paalakaria; Malaysia – Jasminder Kaur Chalal; South Africa – Sorisha Naidoo; United Kingdom – Suky Kaur Sangha

=== Special awards ===
Award	Name	Country
Miss Congeniality	Rohini Banjeree	India
Best Talent	Santripti Vellody	Dubai
Miss Beautiful Eyes	Priya Arora	United States
Miss Beautiful Hair	Suky Kaur Sangha	United Kingdom
Most Beautiful Smile	Gayathri Unnijkrishan	Singapore
Most Beautiful Skin	Rohini Banjeree	India

== Delegates ==
- Australia – Lalenya Brown
- Botswana – Naushina Khan
- Canada – Kiran Shergrill
- Dubai – Santripi Vellody
- France – Nidhya Paalakaria
- Guyana – Marita Ann Persaud
- India – Rohini Banjeree
- Kenya – Sonia Sheikh
- Malaysia – Jasminder Kaur Chalal
- Malawi – Khiloni Baboo
- Mauritius – Vandanah Mahadeo
- Mozambique – Dharma Govind
- Netherlands – Radha Sudan
- New Zealand – Kuljit Singh
- Nigeria – Xiyan Aweke
- Reunion – Karoona Nunhuck
- Singapore – Gayathri Unnijkrishan
- South Africa – Sorisha Naidoo
- Switzerland – Amrita Chandra
- Trinidad – Nadya Nandanie Ramnath
- Uganda – Fenulla Jiwani
- United Kingdom – Suky Kaur Sangha
- United States – Priya Arora
- Zimbabwe – Minal Shukla
