= Miss India Worldwide 1997 =

- Date: November 7, 1997
- Venue: Mumbai, India
- Entrants: 15
- Placements: 10
- Winner: Poonam Chibber; Canada
- Photogenic: Arvasini Persad; South Africa

Miss India Worldwide 1997 was the seventh edition of the international beauty pageant. The final was held in Mumbai, India on November 7, 1997. About 15 countries were represented in the pageant. Poonam Chibber of Canada was crowned as winner at the end of the event.

== Results ==
| Final result | Contestant |
|---|---|
| Miss India Worldwide 1997 | Canada – Poonam Chibber |
| 1st runner-up | Hong Kong – Shruti Nambiar |
| 2nd runner-up | United States – Priya Darshini Ayyar |
| Top 5 | Netherlands – Rishma Soedhoe; South Africa – Arvasini Persad |

=== Special awards ===
| Award | Name | Country |
|---|---|---|
| Miss Photogenic | Arvasini Persad | South Africa |
| Miss Congeniality | Not Known | |
| Best Talent | Shruti Nambiar | Hong Kong |
| Miss Beautiful Eyes | Sumera Peerbhoy | India |
| Miss Beautiful Hair | Shruti Nambiar | Hong Kong |
| Most Beautiful Smile | Poonam Chibber | Canada |
| Most Beautiful Skin | Unknown | |

== Delegates ==
- Canada – Poonam Chibber
- Guyana – Bibi Naema Khan
- Hong Kong – Shruti Nambiar
- India – Sumera Peerbhoy
- Indonesia – Shanti Tolani
- Malaysia – Magaswari Subermaniam
- Netherlands – Rishma Soedhoe
- Singapore – Jeymani Atthiappan
- South Africa – Arvasini Persad
- Suriname – Rosana Mahawatkhan
- Switzerland – Anjali Keshava
- Trinidad – Nalini Ramrattan
- United Kingdom – Anupama Jaidka
- United States – Priya Darshini Ayyar
- Zambia – Sangita Patel
