= Miss India Worldwide 2006 =

- Date: January 28, 2006
- Venue: Mumbai, India
- Entrants: 21
- Placements: 10
- Winner: Trina Chakravarty; United States
- Congeniality: Mona Singh; Germany
- Photogenic: Remona Moodley; South Africa

Miss India Worldwide 2006 was the 15th edition of the international beauty pageant. The final was held in Mumbai, India on January 28, 2006. About 21 countries were represented in the pageant. Trina Chakravarty of the United States was crowned as the winner at the end of the event.

== Results ==
Final result	Contestant
Miss India Worldwide 2006	United States – Trina Chakravarty
1st runner-up	United Kingdom – Nikki Kaur Rana
2nd runner-up	Netherlands – Charlene Asgarali
Top 5	Australia – Tahirah Islam; South Africa – Remona Moodley

=== Special awards ===
Award	Name	Country
Miss Photogenic	Remona Moodley	South Africa
Miss Congeniality	Mona Singh	Germany
Best Talent	Trina Chakravarty	USA
Miss Beautiful Eyes	Aakanksha Mansukhani	Oman
Miss Beautiful Hair	Tahirah Islam	Australia
Most Beautiful Smile	Sabrina Naseem	Djibouti
Most Beautiful Skin	Tejhall Jaiantilal	Mozambique

== Delegates ==
- Australia – Tahirah Islam
- Canada – Nital Gosai
- Djibouti – Sabrina Naseem
- Fiji – Pauline Poonam Nair
- France – Jessica Honoré
- Germany – Mona Singh
- India – Priyanka Jha
- Indonesia – Ritika Sharma
- Jamaica – Chantal Mcdonald
- Malaysia – Bhavani Prasana Ramasendrain
- Mozambique – Tejhall Jaiantilal
- Netherlands – Charlene Asgarali
- New Zealand – Shardae Mitha
- Oman – Aakanksha Mansukhani
- Singapore – Gaiyethri Dio Rahman
- South Africa – Remona Moodley
- Sri Lanka – Nadaraja Karthiga
- Trinidad – Indira Misir
- United Arab Emirates – Rajani Sathyamurthi
- United Kingdom – Nikki Kaur Rana
- United States – Trina Chakravarty

=== Crossovers ===
Contestants who previously competed or will compete at other beauty pageants:

Miss World

- 2012: South Africa: Remona Moodley
