= Miss India Worldwide 1999 =

- Date: November 27, 1999
- Venue: Rahway, New Jersey United States
- Entrants: 22
- Placements: 10
- Winner: Aarti Chabaria; India
- Congeniality: Gaby Janita Arjun Sharma; Netherlands
- Photogenic: Aarti Chabaria; India

Miss India Worldwide 1999 was the ninth edition of the international beauty pageant. The final was held in Rahway, New Jersey United States on November 27, 1999. About 22 countries were represented in the pageant. Aarti Chabaria of India was crowned as winner at the end of the event.

== Results ==
Final result	Contestant
Miss India Worldwide 1999	India – Aarti Chabaria
1st runner-up	United States – Sharan Gill
2nd runner-up	Hong Kong – Anupama Anand
Top 5	Canada – Komila “Kim” Jagtiani; United Arab Emirates – Shweta Vijay
Top 10 Semi-finalists	Grenada – Kavita Malhotra; Mauritius – Géraldine Heeroo; Reunion – Sabrina Swamy; South Africa – Maashi Ramdutt; United Kingdom – Simran Kochar

=== Special awards ===
Award	Name	Country
Miss Photogenic	Aarti Chabaria	India
Miss Congeniality	Gaby Janita Arjun Sharma	Netherlands
Best Talent	Anupama Anand	Hong Kong
Most Beautiful Face	Aarti Chabaria	India
Miss Beautiful Hair	Heera Raghubir	Guyana
Most Beautiful Smile	Kavita Malhotra	Grenada
Most Beautiful Skin	Simran Kochar	United Kingdom

== Delegates ==
- Barbados – Natalie Awad
- Belgium – Neela Premlata Renu Ramdas
- Canada – Komila “Kim” Jagtiani
- Grenada – Kavita Malhotra
- Guyana – Heera Raghubir
- Hong Kong – Anupama Anand
- India – Aarti Chabaria
- Jamaica – Sunita A. Ramlal
- Mauritius – Géraldine Heeroo
- Netherlands – Gaby Janita Arjun Sharma
- Reunion – Sabrina Swamy
- Singapore – Sri Rajini Sathyamurthi
- Sint Maarten – Denisia Sookram
- Sri Lanka – Brenda Menaka Poorajan
- South Africa – Maashi Ramdutt
- Suriname – Maya Sudama
- Switzerland – Shalini Sanghvi
- Trinidad – Kavita Jagmohan
- Tobago – Elizabeth Alicia John
- United Kingdom – Simran Kochar
- United States – Sharan Gill
- United Arab Emirates – Shweta Vijay
