= Miss India Worldwide 2012 =

21st edition of the international beauty pageant

- Date: February 25, 2012
- Venue: Paramaribo, Suriname
- Entrants: 35
- Placements: 11
- Winner: Alana Seebarran; Guyana
- Congeniality: Sharmisttha Yoogan; Malaysia
- Photogenic: Uraysha Ramrachia; Mauritius

Miss India Worldwide 2012 was the 21st edition of the international beauty pageant. The final was held in Paramaribo, Suriname on February 25, 2012. About 35 countries were represented in the pageant. Alana Seebarran of Guyana was crowned as the winner at the end of the event.

== Results ==
Final result	Contestant
Miss India Worldwide 2012	Guyana – Alana Seebarran
1st runner-up	Kuwait – Anvita Sudarshan
2nd runner-up	AUS – Olivia Rose
Top 5	Suriname – Varsha Ramrattan; United Kingdom – Deana Uppal
Semi-finalists	Canada – Shreeya Chawla; Germany – Leonie Singh Dhillon; India – Eram Karim; South Africa – Sheina Gokool; Switzerland – Sharmila Singh; United States – Chandal Kaur

=== Special awards ===
Award	Name	Country
Miss Photogenic	Uraysha Ramrachia	Mauritius
Miss Congeniality	Sharmisttha Yoogan	Malaysia
Best Talent	Alana Seebarran	Guyana
Miss Beautiful Figure	Eram Karim	India
Miss Beautiful Face	Anvita Sudarshan	Kuwait
Miss Beautiful Eyes	Chandal Kaur	USA
Miss Beautiful Hair	Ankita Arora	Italy
Most Beautiful Smile	Shreeya Chawla	Canada
Most Beautiful Skin	Varsha Ramrattan	Suriname
Miss Professional	Veebha Sharma	Qatar
Miss Catwalk	Lizann Lourdes Afonso	Dubai
Miss Bollywood Diva	Deana Uppal	United Kingdom

== Delegates ==
- Australia – Olivia Rose
- Bahrain – Natasha Adil Katrik
- Barbados – Tanha Dil
- Canada – Shreeya Chawla
- France – Christina Suthanthara
- French Guiana – Wirasha Kasi
- Germany – Leonie Singh Dhillon
- Guadeloupe – Seetha Doulayram
- Guyana – Alana Seebarran
- India – Eram Karim
- Ireland – Komal Udani
- Italy – Ankita Arora
- Jamaica – Shannell Brown
- Kuwait – Anvita Sudarshan
- Malaysia – Sharmisttha Yoogan
- Martinique – Sanjna Reinette
- Mauritius – Uraysha Ramrachia
- Netherlands – Charisma Dihal
- New Zealand – Madhu Ramasubramanian
- Qatar – Veebha Sharma
- Scotland – Rameet Kaur
- Sint Maarten – Sheha Idnani
- Singapore – Kavita Sonapal Kaur
- South Africa – Sheina Gokool
- Spain – Vinatha Sreeramkumar
- Sri Lanka – Lavanya Kunalingam
- Suriname – Varsha Ramrattan
- Switzerland – Sharmila Singh
- Thailand – Komal Gandhi
- Trinidad – Raivatie Usha Sooknanan
- Uganda – Ruchi Vohra
- Dubai – Lizann Lourdes Afonso
- United Kingdom – Deana Uppal
- United States – Chandal Kaur
- Virgin Island – Monica Vaswani
