= Miss India Worldwide 2000 =

- Date: November 25, 2000
- Venue: Tampa, Florida, United States
- Entrants: 16
- Placements: 10
- Winner: Ritu Upadhyay; United States
- Congeniality: Sapna Malini; Fiji
- Photogenic: Subashnie Devkaran; South Africa

Miss India Worldwide 2000 was the tenth edition of the international beauty pageant. The final was held in Tampa, Florida, United States on November 25, 2000. About 16 countries were represented in the pageant. Ritu Upadhyay of the United States was crowned as the winner at the end of the event.

== Results ==
Final result	Contestant
Miss India Worldwide 2000	United States – Ritu Upadhyay
1st runner-up	Malaysia – Jayalaxmi Appadorai
2nd runner-up	India – Sheetal Shah
Top 5	Canada – Retu Jahlan; Netherlands – Rovana Shankar
Top 10	Jamaica – Munchan Ahmed Ghelani; Kenya – Preeti Ghelani; Nepal – Nikita Bhandari Kshatriya; Suriname – Namita Ajodhia; United Kingdom – Simran Kochar

=== Special awards ===
Award	Name	Country
Miss Photogenic	Subashnie Devkaran	South Africa
Miss Congeniality	Sapna Malini	Fiji
Best Talent	Rovana Shankar	Netherlands
Miss Beautiful Face	Unknown	
Miss Beautiful Hair	Preeti Ghelani	Kenya
Most Beautiful Smile	Unknown	
Most Beautiful Skin	Unknown	

== Delegates ==
- Canada – Retu Jahlan
- Fiji – Sapna Malini
- Germany – Unknown
- Guyana – Unknown
- India – Sheetal Shah
- Jamaica – Munchan Ahmed Ghelani
- Kenya – Preeti Ghelani
- Malaysia – Jayalaxmi Appadorai
- Nepal – Nikita Bhandari Kshatriya
- Netherlands – Rovana Shankar
- Singapore – Vanitha Veerasamy
- South Africa – Subashnie Devkaran
- Suriname – Namita Ajodhia
- United Arab Emirates – Unknown
- United Kingdom – Simran Kochar
- United States – Ritu Upadhyay
