= Miss India Worldwide 2013 =

- Date: April 28, 2013
- Venue: Kuala Lumpur, Malaysia
- Entrants: 39
- Placements: 10
- Winner: Nehal Bhogaita; United Kingdom
- Congeniality: Aavishka Ragam; Singapore
- Best Talented: Gayathri Kesavan; Spain

Miss India Worldwide 2013 was the 22nd edition of the international beauty pageant. The final was held in Kuala Lumpur, Malaysia on April 28, 2013. About 39 countries were represented in the pageant. Nehal Bhogaita of the United Kingdom was crowned as winner at the end of the event. Nehal was the first deaf contestant and first deaf winner in the pageant's history.

== Results ==
Final result	Contestant
Miss India Worldwide 2013	United Kingdom – Nehal Bhogaita
1st runner-up	Malaysia – Jasveer Kaur Sandhu
2nd runner-up	Oman – Surbhi Sachdev
Top 5	Nigeria – Ayushi Chhabra; United Arab Emirates – Geentanjali Kelath
Top 10	Sint Maarten – Dolly Mirpuri; Singapore – Aavishka Ragam; South Africa – Koschika Singh; Spain – Gayathri Kesavan; Sri Lanka – Rukshani Ranathunga

=== Special awards ===
Miss Photogenic	Janita Deerpaul	Mauritius
Miss Congeniality	Aavishka Ragam	Singapore
Miss Best Talented	Gayathri Kesavan	Spain

== Delegates ==
- Andorra – Karishma Manwani
- Australia – Zenia Starr Miss India Australia 2013
- Bahrain – Arpita Khaur
- Belize – Janine Gilharry
- Canada – Rupal Lakhani
- Fiji – Sheryl Kumar
- France – Joelle Joseph
- French Guiana – Shivani Sandher
- Germany – Kershnee Pillay
- Guadeloupe – Cindy Patrix
- Guyana – Katherina Roshana
- India – Preeti Soni
- Indonesia – Shreenjit Kaur
- Italy – Selma Gabbarini
- Kenya – Bhavini Sheth
- Kuwait – Manisha Singh
- Malaysia – Jasveer Kaur Sandhu
- Mauritius – Jannita Deerpaul
- Martinique – Madleen Appaoo
- Nepal – Gareema Pandey
- Netherlands – Astrid Narain
- New Zealand – Anamika Singh
- Nigeria – Ayushi Chhabra
- Norway – Nisha Haroon
- Oman – Surbhi Sachdev
- Qatar – Alysha Suri
- Reunion – Carole Ravoula
- Sint Maarten – Dolly Mirpuri
- Singapore – Aavishka Ragam
- South Africa – Koschika Singh
- Spain – Gayathri Kesavan
- Sri Lanka – Rukshani Ranathunga
- Suriname – Jeanine Jaikaran
- Switzerland – Ritika Sood
- Trinidad – Shridevi Bissoondial
- Uganda – Savi Chaplot
- United Arab Emirates – Geentanjali Kelath
- United Kingdom – Nehal Bhogaita
- United States – Priyam Bhargava

=== Crossovers ===
Contestants who previously competed or will compete at other beauty pageants:

Miss Universe

- 2013: Guyana: Katherina Roshana
