= Miss India Worldwide 1991 =

- Winner: Bela Bajaria; United States

Miss India Worldwide 1991 was the second edition of the international female beauty pageant. The total number of contestants was not known. Bela Bajaria of the United States crowned as winner at the end of the event.

== Results ==
| Final result | Contestant |
|---|---|
| Miss India Worldwide 1991 | United States – Bela Bajaria |
| 1st runner-up | India – Rithu Singh |
| 2nd runner-up | Guyana – Sandra Singh |
| Top 5 | Canada – Kamal Sidhu; South Africa – Gerelene Jagganath |
| Top 12 | Germany – Shalini Singh; Netherlands – Asha Bhoelai; Israel – Ronit Yehskiel; Mauritius – Anastasia Ramlall; Singapore – Suriakava Manikam; Switzerland – Smita Bansal; United Kingdom – Anupama Jaidka |

== Delegates ==
- Canada – Kamal Sidhu
- Germany – Shalini Singh
- Guyana – Sandra Singh
- India – Ritu Singh
- Israel – Ronit Yehskiel
- Mauritius – Anastasia Ramlall
- Netherlands – Asha Bhoelai
- Singapore – Suriakava Manikam
- South Africa – Gerelene Jagganath
- Switzerland – Smita Bansal
- United Kingdom – Anupama Jaidka
- United States – Bela Bajaria
