= Miss India Worldwide 2003 =

- Date: September 27, 2003
- Venue: San Francisco, California, United States
- Entrants: 21
- Placements: 10
- Winner: Purva Merchant; India
- Congeniality: Purva Merchant; India
- Photogenic: Pooja Chitgopekar; New Zealand

Miss India Worldwide 2003 was the 13th edition of the international beauty pageant. The final was held in San Francisco, California, United States on September 27, 2003. About 21 countries were represented in the pageant. Purva Merchant of India was crowned as the winner at the end of the event.

== Results ==
Final result	Contestant
Miss India Worldwide 2003	India – Purva Merchant
1st runner-up	New Zealand – Pooja Chitgopekar
2nd runner-up	United States – Meghna Nagarajan
Top 5	Australia – Rashi Chandhok; South Africa – Shabnam Mohammed

=== Special awards ===
Award	Name	Country
Miss Photogenic	Purva Merchant	India
Miss Congeniality	Pooja Chitgopekar	New Zealand
Best Talent	Pooja Chitgopekar	New Zealand
Miss Beautiful Eyes	Anjali Punjabi	Hong Kong
Miss Beautiful Hair	Laavanya Ambur	Germany
Most Beautiful Smile	Meghna Nagarajan	United States
Most Beautiful Skin	Rashi Chandhok	Australia

== Delegates ==
- Australia – Rashi Chandhok
- Bahrain – Sweta Joshi
- Canada – Shalini Vasdani
- Fiji – Priscilla Solanki
- France – Kiranne Devi
- Germany – Laavanya Ambur
- Gibraltar – Sheetal Viroomal
- Hong Kong – Anjali Punjabi
- India – Purva Merchant
- Indonesia – Shraysi Tandon
- Kenya – Rakhi Shah
- Netherlands – Shrila Jagessar
- New Zealand – Pooja Chitgopekar
- Singapore – Sujeeta Menon
- South Africa – Shabnam Mohammed
- Spain – Pinky Shamdasani
- Trinidad – Nadya Nandanie Ramnath
- Uganda – Fenulla Jiwani
- United Arab Emirates – Sahiba Singh
- United Kingdom – Neelam Salhotra
- United States – Meghna Nagarajan

=== Crossovers ===
Contestants who previously competed or will compete at other beauty pageants:

Miss Earth

- 2007: New Zealand: Pooja Chitgopekar (Placement: Miss Earth Air)
  - India's representative
