= Miss India Worldwide 2007 =

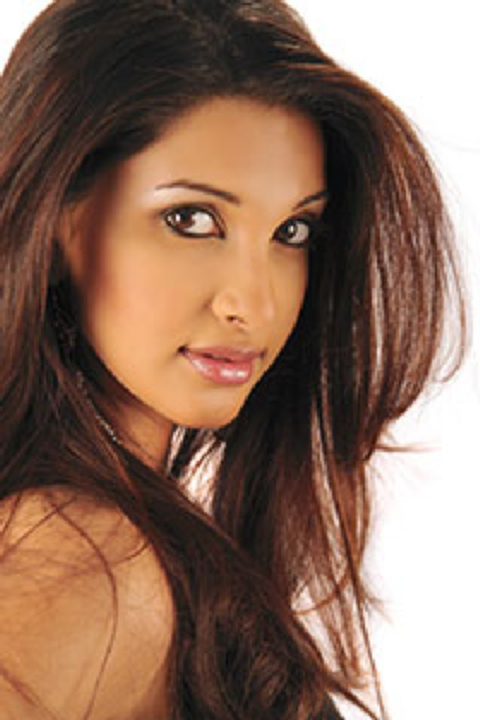
- The winner Fareisa Joemmanbaks
- Date: April 8, 2007
- Venue: Fords, New Jersey, United States
- Entrants: 19
- Placements: 10
- Winner: Fareisa Joemmanbaks; Suriname
- Congeniality: Nadia Vorajee; South Africa
- Photogenic: Nadia Vorajee; South Africa

Miss India Worldwide 2007 was the 16th edition of the international beauty pageant. The final was held in Fords, New Jersey, United States on April 8, 2007. About 19 countries were represented in the pageant. Fareisa Joemmanbaks of Suriname was crowned as the winner at the end of the event.

== Results ==
Final result	Contestant
Miss India Worldwide 2007	Suriname – Fareisa Joemmanbaks
1st runner-up	South Africa – Nadia Vorajee
2nd runner-up	Canada – Sapna Sehravat
Top 5	India – Movina Nagarajan; United Kingdom – Snehali Naik
Top 10	Australia – Kiara Podesta; Malaysia – Reneetha Veeraya; Netherlands – Reneetha Veeraya; United Arab Emirates – Ashita Ghote; United States – Ayushka Singh-Gharib

=== Special awards ===
Award	Name	Country
Miss Photogenic	Nadia Vorajee	South Africa
Miss Congeniality	Nadia Vorajee	South Africa
Best Talent	Sapna Sehravat	Canada
Miss Beautiful Eyes	Sabrina Bou Ali	Morocco
Miss Beautiful Hair	Reneetha Veeraya	Malaysia
Most Beautiful Smile	Jaishree Manuferan	Singapore
Most Beautiful Skin	Priya Singh	Fiji

== Delegates ==
- Australia – Kiara Podesta
- Canada – Sapna Sehravat
- Fiji – Priya Singh
- France – Sunita Vaz
- Guyana – Annushka Prabhudyal
- India – Movina Nagarajan
- Ireland – Sonya Bugwandeen-Reilly
- Jamaica – Racquel Baghaloo
- Malaysia – Reneetha Veeraya
- Morocco – Sabrina Bou Ali
- Netherlands – Celina Kalfane
- New Zealand – Gaganpreet Kaur
- Singapore – Jaishree Manuferan
- South Africa – Nadia Vorajee
- Suriname – Fareisa Joemmanbaks
- Trinidad – Anushka Nirupa Dube
- United Arab Emirates – Ashita Ghote
- United Kingdom – Snehali Naik
- United States – Ayushka Singh-Gharib
