= Bela Bajaria =

British-American businesswoman and media executive

- Born: 1970 (age 55–56); London Borough of Brent, England
- Education: Torrance High School, Rolling Hills High School
- Alma mater: California State University, Long Beach
- Occupations: Businesswoman and media executive
- Years active: 2016–present
- Employer: Netflix, Inc.
- Title: Chief content officer
- Spouse: Doug Prochilo
- Children: 3
- Awards: Miss India Worldwide 1991
- Honours: Miss LA India contest, Miss India USA

Bela Bajaria (born 1970) is a British-American businesswoman and media executive. She joined Netflix in 2016 to oversee unscripted and scripted series. Bajaria was the chief content officer from January 2023 until October 2026.

== Early life and education ==
Bajaria was born in London, England, to parents of Gujarati descent and spent time in London and Zambia growing up. In the 1970s, when Bajaria was four, her parents moved from London to the United States' West Coast with her brother to explore business opportunities. However, her parents overstayed their visas and became illegal immigrants, resulting in Baja being raised by her grandparents until her parents could legally obtain residency. Upon joining her parents in the United States in 1979, she enrolled in the local Los Angeles public schools. As a teenager, she attended Torrance High School and Rolling Hills High School while working as a cashier.

Upon graduating high school, Bajaria was encouraged to enter beauty pageants by a friend. She subsequently won the Miss LA India contest, Miss India USA, and Miss India Worldwide 1991. Bajaria graduated from California State University, Long Beach in 1995 with a Bachelor of Arts degree in communications.

== Career ==
Upon graduating from university, Bajaria accepted a position with CBS in 1996 as an assistant in the movies and miniseries department. As an assistant, she read scripts and spent hours in CBS' basement videotape library studying old films. She left CBS for a management position at Warner Bros. Television Studios but returned to CBS in 1997 as a director. After the January 2002 departure of longtime CBS Movies and Miniseries senior vice president Sunta Izzicupo, under whom she had worked since the mid-'90s, Bajaria was promoted to vice president and then senior vice president. When television films began to decline, Bajaria requested a move to CBS' production studio to develop cable shows. She joined Universal Television as executive vice president in 2011 and shortly thereafter became president of the studio.

Bajaria joined Netflix in 2016 as head of unscripted and scripted content. In the same year, she was ranked 43rd on Fortune's Most Powerful Women list. In 2019, she began leading all local language series. In 2020, she was promoted to the role of global head of television for Netflix and three years later she was named Chief Content Officer.

In both 2021 and 2022, Bajaria was named one of the top "captains" of the home entertainment industry in the annual Media Play News Women in Home Entertainment issue. In December 2022, she was named to The Hollywood Reporter's Women in Entertainment Power 100.

In October 2026, it was announced that Bajaria would be leaving Netflix, with Peter Rice succeeding her as chief content officer. News of her departure came a day after the company announced layoffs of a thousand employees.

== Personal life ==
Bajaria and her husband, writer-producer Doug Prochilo, have three children: two daughters and one son.

On May 4, 2021, the Chicago Red Stars of the National Women's Soccer League announced that Bajaria had joined the women's soccer team's ownership group.

== Accolades ==
- 2023 – Forbes World's 100 most powerful women
- 2023 – 53rd on Fortune's list of Most Powerful Women
- 2022 – Time 100 Most Influential People
- 2022 – The Hollywood Reporter's Women in Entertainment Power 100
