= Jyoti Singh (actress) =

Indian-American actress

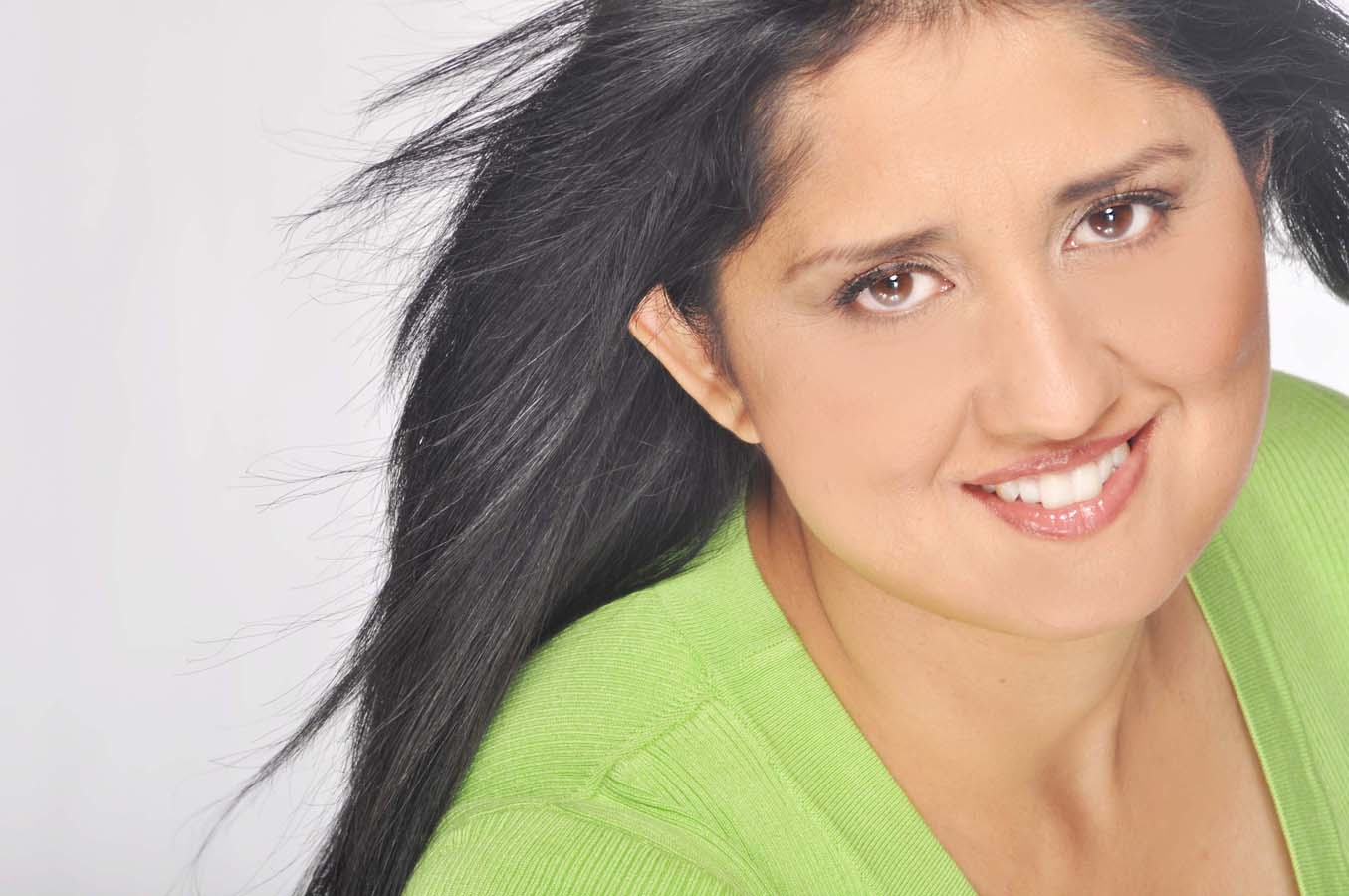
- Singh, 2010
- Born: Dehradun, Uttarakhand, India
- Occupations: Actor; film director
- Spouse: Sumeet Verma
- Awards: Winner Best Actress at The People's Film Festival, New York 2014
- Website: jyotisingh.net

Jyoti Singh is a US-based actress of Indian origin. She is also the director of Yadvi – The Dignified Princess, a biopic on Maharani Yadhuvansh Kumari, the daughter of Maharaja Bhupinder Singh of Patiala.

== Early life ==
Jyoti Singh lived with her grandmother, Maharani Yadhuvansh Kumari, till she was 13 years old. After that, she along with her mother and sisters moved to the United States of America.

== Career ==
After working as an actress for close to a decade, Jyoti Singh turned a director with Yadvi – The Dignified Princess, which went on to be screened at numerous film festivals across the world.

The film got positive to mixed reviews across board.

As an actress Jyoti has worked on NBC mini series The Slap and the Bollywood movie Mirror Game.
