= Miss India Worldwide 1996 =

- Venue: New York City, New York, United States
- Winner: Sandhya Chib; India

Miss India Worldwide 1996 was the sixth edition of the international female pageant. The final was held in New York City, New York, United States. The total number of contestants is not known. Sandhya Chib of India was crowned as the winner at the end of the event.

== Results ==
Final result	Contestant
Miss India Worldwide 1996	India – Sandhya Chib
1st runner-up	South Africa – Krijay Govender
2nd runner-up	United States – Pooja Kumar
Top 5	Canada – Rishma Malik; Ethiopia – Sharon Chandni

=== Special awards ===
Award	Name	Country
Miss Photogenic	Not Known	
Miss Congeniality	Krijay Govender	South Africa
Best Talent	Krijay Govender	South Africa

== Delegates ==
- Canada – Rishma Malik
- Ethiopia – Sharon Chandni
- India – Sandhya Chib
- South Africa – Krijay Govender
- United States – Pooja Kumar
- Netherlands – Maya Kalloe

=== Crossovers ===
Contestants who previously competed or will compete at other beauty pageants:

Miss Universe

- 1996: India: Sandhya Chib (Semi-finalists)
