= Miss India Worldwide 2001 =

- Date: March 9, 2001
- Venue: San Jose, California, United States
- Entrants: 14
- Placements: 10
- Winner: Sarika Sukhdeo; South Africa
- Congeniality: Parveen Sian; United Kingdom
- Photogenic: Ekta Bhatt; Tanzania

Miss India Worldwide 2001 was the 11th edition of the international beauty pageant. The final was held in Durban, South Africa on March 9, 2001. About 14 countries were represented in the pageant. Sarika Sukhdeo of South Africa crowned as the winner at the end of the event.

== Results ==
Final result	Contestant
Miss India Worldwide 2001	South Africa – Sarika Sukhdeo
1st runner-up	Trinidad – Tricia Bhim
2nd runner-up	Tanzania – Ekta Bhatt
Top 5	United Kingdom – Parveen Sian; United States – Stacy Isaac

=== Special awards ===
Award	Name	Country
Miss Photogenic	Ekta Bhatt	Tanzania
Miss Congeniality	Parveen Sian	United Kingdom
Best Talent	Stacy Isaac	United States
Miss Beautiful Eyes	Stacy Isaac	United States
Miss Beautiful Hair	Sarika Sukhdeo	South Africa
Most Beautiful Smile	Hiral Shah	Kenya
Most Beautiful Skin	Unknown	

== Delegates ==
- Canada – Stephanie Singh
- India – Anurithi Chikkerpur
- Jamaica – Tejal Patel
- Kenya – Hiral Shah
- Malaysia – Mohanaapriya Sina Raja
- Netherlands – Marilyn Ahelia Sewbalak
- Norway – Priya Isaac
- Singapore – Krisstel Martin
- South Africa – Sarika Sukhdeo
- Trinidad – Tricia Bhim
- Tanzania – Ekta Bhatt
- United Arab Emirates – Nova Krishnan
- United Kingdom – Parveen Sian
- United States – Stacy Isaac
