= Miss India Connecticut =

Connecticut beauty pageant, USA

Miss India CT is an annual Connecticut beauty contest for Indian origin girls who are residents of the state. The Pageant consists of two competitions, Miss India Connecticut (17–27 years old) and Miss India Teen Connecticut (14 –16 years old). This includes a catwalk by the contestants in Indian dress, Western dress, a talent show, and a special interview on questions related to healthy living .

The winners represent the Connecticut state in Miss India USA Pageant together with the winners from other states. The winners of Miss India USA, in turn, represent the US in the annual Miss India Worldwide Pageant that has been acclaimed as “the most glamorous Indian event” outside India. Participants and the winners from Miss India Beauty Pageants have gone on to achieve stellar careers in professional fields and have also served as ambassadors of Indian community and culture in the world.

The First Miss India Connecticut Beauty Pageant took place on Sunday November 8, 2009 at the Westover Elementary School in Stamford Connecticut.

Ronita Choudhuri was crowned Miss India CT 2012 on Sunday September 9, 2012.
