= Amrita Hunjan =

British model and singer (born 1984)

Amrita Hunjan (born 25 June 1984) is a British model and singer. She is known for being a singer in the R'n'B/pop band Rouge. Amrita is also known in the British Asian community for being the winner of Miss India UK 2004 and Miss India Worldwide 2005. She was ranked as the 20th most sexy Asian woman in the world by Eastern Eye in 2007.

== Early life ==
Amrita was born in Leeds and claims to be "Yorkshire born and bred". She is 5 feet 6 inches tall (1.68 m). She studied dentistry at Birmingham University.

== Miss India and Rouge ==
Amrita won Miss India UK 2004. A rendition of Maria McKee's 'Show Me Heaven' saw her singing voice being compared to the likes of Mariah Carey and Whitney Houston. She then won the "Miss India Worldwide" competition held in New Delhi, India in January 2005.

With friend Laura Ismail and fellow band member Legha Yousuf, they formed the band Rouge in 2005. Over the next year, they released they appeared on the single by Zeus feat. Rouge, "Don't Be Shy", and the subsequent self-titled debut album. Hunjan has performed in New York, Dubai, and the netherlands.

== Future plans ==
In 2008, Amrita was reported to be focusing on her studies, with the next Rouge album set to be produced by Timbaland in Miami. She was reportedly writing and recording with Rouge, and they were said to be "in no rush to release it until they get it right".
