= Miss India Worldwide 2017 =

- Date: October 8, 2017
- Venue: Royal Albert’s Palace, Fords, New Jersey, USA
- Broadcaster: TV Asia
- Entrants: 14
- Winner: Madhu Valli; USA
- Congeniality: Sangeeta Bahadur; Guyana
- Photogenic: Aarzu Singh; Australia

Miss India Worldwide 2017 was the 26th edition of the Miss India Worldwide pageant, held on 8 October 2017. The event was held at Royal Albert's Palace in New Jersey, United States.

Karina Kohli of the United States crowned her successor Madhu Valli of the US at the end of the event.

== Results ==
Final result	Contestant
Miss India Worldwide 2017	United States - Madhu Valli
1st runner-up	France – Stephanie Madavane
2nd runner-up	Guyana – Sangeeta Bahadur
Top 5	Australia – Aarzu Singh; Saudi Arabia – Reema Matthew
Top 8	Netherlands – Erisha Ghogli; Kenya – Shivani Shah; South Africa – Supriya Soorju

=== Special awards ===
Award	Name	Country
Miss Congeniality	Sangeeta Bahadur	Guyana
Miss Cawalk	Stephanie Madavane	France
Miss Photogenic	Aarzu Singh	Australia
Miss Beautiful Face	Dilpreet Kaur	United Kingdom
Miss Beautiful Smile	Archana Goundar	Fiji
Miss Beautiful Skin	Shivani Shah	Kenya
Miss Beautiful Hair	Supriya Soorju	South Africa
Miss Beautiful Eyes	Erisha Ghogli	Netherlands
Miss Bollywood Diva	Priya Dhunna	Canada
Chairman Miss Professional	Amardeep Talwar	Luxembourg

== Contestants ==
14 contestants competed for the title of Miss India Worldwide 2017.

- Australia – Aarzu Singh
- Canada – Priya Dhunna
- Fiji – Archana Goundar
- France – Stephanie Madavane
- Guyana – Sangeeta Bahadur
- India – Reena Merchant
- Kenya – Shivani Shah
- Luxembourg – Amardeep Talwar
- Mauritius – Sanjeda Rumajogee
- Netherlands – Erisha Ghogli
- New Zealand – Kashni Thakur
- Saudi Arabia - Reema Matthew
- South Africa – Supriya Soorju
- United Kingdom – Dilpreet Kaur
- United States – Madhu Valli

== Crossovers ==
Contestants who previously competed or will compete at other beauty pageants:

- Mauritius – Sanjeda Rumajogee, Miss India Worldwide Mauritius, has been conferred the title of Miss Humanity Hope 2017 by Cancer Association of Mauritius (CANMA).
- United Kingdom – Dilpreet Kaur, Miss India UK, won the title of Andaman Beauty Pageant 2017 in Port Blair, Andaman and Nicobar Islands.
