= Miss India USA =

American beauty contest

- Formation: 1980
- Founder: Dharmatma Saran
- Founded at: New York City, United States
- Type: Beauty pageant
- Headquarters: New York City
- Location: United States
- Members: Miss India Worldwide (1990–present)
- Official language: English
- Owner: Dharmatma Saran
- Chairman: Dharmatma Saran
- Parent organization: India Festival Committee
- Website: www.worldwidepageants.com

Miss India USA is a beauty pageant for young women of Indian descent who are residents of the United States. The pageant was established in 1980 by the India Festival Committee headed by Dharmatma Saran. The winner of the Miss India USA pageant represents the United States at the Miss India Worldwide pageant.

The current titleholder of Miss India USA is Caitlin Sandra Neil.

== Titleholders ==
Year	Miss India USA	State Represented
1980	Surita Mansukhani	Illinois
1981	Sabina Paul	Pennsylvania
1982	Rani Chandran	Illinois
1983	Neeta Puri	New York
1984	Sandhya Satia	New York
1985	Nimisha Patel	New York
1985	Radhika Rao	Massachusetts
1986	Vidya Chandra Sekhar	Michigan
1987	Luckmi Anantha	Texas
1988	Vaishali Mathur	Texas
1989–1990	Simi Chaddha	Illinois
1991	Bela Bajaria	California
1992	Icha Singh	Georgia
1993	Rathna Kanchrela	Georgia
1994	Kavita Chabra	California
1995	Pooja Kumar	Missouri
1996	Priya Ayyar	Washington
1997	Nileem Shah	New Jersey
1999	Sharan Kaur	California
2000	Ritu Upadhyay	Illinois
2001	Stacy Isaac	Florida
2002	Priya Arora	Arizona
2003	Meghna Nagarajan	Georgia
2004	Reshoo Pande	Mississippi
2005	Trina Chakravarty	Florida
2006	Ayushka Singh Gharib	Nevada
2007	Richa Gangopadhyay	Michigan
2008	Nikkitasha Marwaha	District of Columbia
2009	Priyanka Singha	California
2010	Natasha Arora	Texas
2011	Chandan Kaur	New York
2012	Priyam Bhargava	District of Columbia
2013	Monica Gill	Massachusetts
2014	Pranathy Sharma Gangaraju	Georgia
2015	Karina Kohli	New York
2016	Madhu Valli	Virginia
2017	Shree Saini	Washington
2019	Kim Kumari	New Jersey
2019–2020	Aaishwariya Gulani	Florida
2021	Vaidehi Dongre	Michigan
2022	Aarya Walvekar	Virginia
2023	Rijul Maini	Michigan
2024	Caitlin Sandra Neil	California

== See also ==
- Indian Americans
- Indians in the New York City metropolitan region
- Miss India Connecticut
