= Uppekha Jain =

Canadian actress, model, and television anchor

- Born: Jammu, Jammu and Kashmir, India
- Citizenship: Canada
- Occupations: Actress, model, anchor
- Years active: 2007–present

Uppekha Jain is a Canadian actress, model, TV anchor, writer, dancer and spoken word artist. She is the first Canadian to essay a permanent role on prime time Indian television, in Star Plus' top rated soap opera Saath Nibhaana Saathiya. She played the conniving, NRI daughter-in-law, Monika Modi, bent on creating havoc in the Modi household from early 2016 to mid-2017. Uppekha is also internationally known for her viral video #Rap Against Rape (a spoken word rap she wrote & performed), that created worldwide waves shaming rape culture in India. Uppekha was crowned Miss India Worldwide Canada in 2008 and went on to win the 1st princess Miss India Worldwide title in 2010.

== Career and early life ==
Uppekha Jain was born in a Dogra Hindu family in Jammu. She grew up in the Greater Toronto Area and though studious, she was always encouraged to explore the arts. Jain is an accomplished kathak and bharatnatyam dancer, having performed across the world as a Company A dancer with Toronto's finest Classical Indian Dance Institute Sampradaya Dance Creations, under the tutelage of the renowned Lata Pada. Jain spent her teenage years in Mississauga enrolled in the International Business & Technology program at Gordon Graydon Memorial Secondary School and later transferred to The Woodlands School. She graduated high school at the top of her class and was admitted into the BBA program at Wilfrid Laurier University. After graduating with honours, Uppekha was hired as an Associate Brand Manager at Cadbury Adams, where she worked for just over a year before quitting her promising corporate career to pursue her passion for the arts. While working at Cadbury, Uppekha continued to perform with her dance group and also enrolled in various acting courses including with Toronto's renowned Sear's & Switzer Acting School. It was at that time she won the Miss India Worldwide Canada and Miss India Worldwide 1st Princess titles in 2008, 2009. She also went home with the titles of Miss Beautiful Smile & Miss Talented. Soon after came a role in the Mike Myers and Jessica Alba-starrer The Love Guru. Following which, she acted in various commercials in the GTA. But Mumbai called and Jain packed her bags and moved to the City of Dreams in 2011.

While navigating her way across unknown plains in Mumbai, Uppekha was lucky to bag her very first commercial/ad opposite Bollywood superstar Shah Rukh Khan. There after came a slew of ads for various brands and with various Bollywood stars, including Hoppits with Priyanka Chopra, Yardley and Line App with Katrina Kaif, Just Dance with Hrithik Roshan, Simply Learn with Irfan Khan and various others for household brands including Parle, Dove, Pantene, Maruti, Karbonn Mobile, Blackberry, Mumbai Midday, Koryo, and others.

Uppekha acted in leading roles for the independent features The Interview and Moods of Crime, and a supporting role in Yash Raj Films first release from Y-Films, titled Luv Ka The End. Uppekha also built a successful career as a live show anchor/emcee, hosting over 300 events for various corporate, celebrity and televised shows both in Indian and internationally. She is a sought after celebrity anchor in India and North America today.

In addition to film acting, Uppekha is also a theater actress and was a permanent cast member of the Indian rendition of Eve Ensler's off-Broadway play Emotional Creatures, a play that shed light on atrocities and the secret lives of girls across the world. She also performed in various other theatre productions in India.

In 2015 Uppekha wrote, co-produced and performed in a YouTube video entitled #RapAgainstRape that garnered international acclaim from top publications, including The Huffington Post, The Wall Street Journal, NRI Tribune, Cosmopolitan and a host of other publications as well as news shows. The video slammed misogyny and the regressive mindset still present in India while bringing awareness to the atrocities women face and including rape, assault and hypocrisy in India.

In 2016, Uppekha bagged the permanent cast role on Star Plus's long-running hit soap opera Saath Nibhana Saathiya. Her conniving yet fashionable character of Monika Modi struck a chord with audiences, and the antagonistic mother-in-law and daughter-in-law "Jodi" with co-star Lovey Sasan became widely popular. In March 2017, though, both Lovey and Uppekha decided to quit the show. According to sources, Jain was not happy with the track record of her character.

== Filmography ==
Films

Year	Film	Language	Character	Notes
2007	Kaali Ma	Hindi	Lead actress and dancer	Short film
2008	The Love Guru	English	dancer	Cameo
2009	I Do. Do I?	English	Priya	Independent short film
2013	The Interview	Priya	Lead Role	
2014	Luv Ka The End	Maya	Supporting Role	
2015	Moods of Crime	Hindi	Pooja Desai	Lead role
2017	Tales of Sin: Trophy	Lead Role	Filming	
2018	Forgive Me, Father	Lead Role	Marianna	

Television

Year(s)	Series	Channel	Character	Notes
2016–17	Saath Nibhaana Saathiya	Star Plus	Monika Samar Modi	Supporting role
