= Aarti Chabria =

Indian actress (born 1982)

- Chabria in 2016
- Born: 21 November 1982 (age 43); Bombay, Maharashtra, India
- Occupations: Actor; model
- Years active: 2001-present
- Spouse: Visharad Beedassy (m. 2019)

Aarti Chabria (born 21 November 1982) is an Indian actress and former model who appears in Hindi, Telugu, Punjabi and Kannada films.

== Modeling career ==
Aarti Chabria started her career as a model in advertisements at the age of three years. Her first advertisement was a press Ad for Farex. After which she continued modeling for more than 300 Television commercials for Maggi Noodles, Pepsodent Toothpaste, Clean & Clear Face Wash, Amul Frostick Ice Cream, Krack Cream, and LML Trendy Scooter. Her recent TVC's are Kalyan Jewellers with Amitabh Bachchan, Nirma Advance with Hrithik Roshan, and Goldie Masale with Salman Khan to name a few.

She won the Miss India Worldwide 1999 pageant in November 1999 along with awards for the sub rounds where she was crowned Miss Photogenic and Miss Beautiful Face. After winning the pageant, she did music videos 'Nasha hi Nasha hai' for Sukhwinder Singh, 'Chaahat' for Harry Anand, 'Meri Madhubala' for Avdooth Gupte, and 'Roothe Hue Ho Kyo' for Adnan Sami.

== Acting career ==
She made her acting debut in the Bollywood film, Lajja (2001), directed by Rajkumar Santoshi. and then starred in the film Tum Se Achcha Kaun Hai (2002), along with Nakul Kapoor and Kim Sharma. She next starred opposite Akshay Kumar in Awara Paagal Deewana and was appreciated for her work. She starred in movies like Raja Bhaiya, Shaadi No. 1, Teesri Aankh: The Hidden Camera, Shootout at Lokhandwala, Milenge Milenge and Dus Tola.

She made appearances in Telugu language films beginning with her debut role in Madhura Kshanam and then went on to act in several films such as Okariki Okaru, Intlo Srimathi Veedhilo Kumari, Chintakayala Ravi and Gopi – Goda Meeda Pilli. She appeared in a few Kannada language films and later appeared in the Punjabi film Vyah 70 km (2013).

Chabria was the winner of the fourth season of Fear Factor - Khatron Ke Khiladi, in 2011. In 2013, She was a contestant on the show Jhalak Dikhhla Jaa 6.

Aarti graduated in film direction from the New York Film Academy and later went on to produce and direct a 30-minute long-short film, Mumbai Varanasi Express which won many awards, screened at film festivals and was acquired by Royal Stag Large Short Films. She currently directs TVC's and music videos under her production banner Rising Phoenix.

== Other work ==
Aarti promotes wellness, mindset methods, and holistic growth in her chat series, Secrets of a Victorious Mind.

Aarti is the founder of an online coaching platform Victorious Mind Power which hosts a range of programmes based on motivation architecture, spiritual strategy and creative mindset methods. She is the creator and host of a programme called The Perfect Soulmate Programme which helps people find their ideal life partner.

== Personal life ==
She got engaged to Australia-based chartered accountant Visharad Beedassy in Mauritius and married him in a private ceremony in Mumbai in 2019.

== Filmography ==
Year	Title	Role	Language	Notes
2001	Lajja	Sushma	Hindi	
2001	Madhura Kshanam	Anuja	Telugu	
2002	Tum Se Achcha Kaun Hai	Naina Dixit	Hindi	
2002	Awara Paagal Deewana	Tina Chappu	Hindi	
2003	Raja Bhaiya	Pratibha Sahni/Radha	Hindi	
2003	Okariki Okaru	Subbalakshmi	Telugu	
2004	Intlo Srimathi Veedhilo Kumari	Anjali	Telugu	
2004	Ab Tumhare Hawale Watan Saathiyo	Trilok's wife	Hindi	Special appearance
2005	Aham Premasmi	Apsara	Kannada	
2005	Shaadi No. 1	Rekha Kothari	Hindi	
2005	Ssukh	Bhavna Rakesh Verma	Hindi	
2006	Teesri Aankh: The Hidden Camera	Aarti	Hindi	
2006	Gopi – Goda Meeda Pilli	Monica Judi	Telugu	
2007	Shootout at Lokhandwala	Tarannum "Tanu"	Hindi	
2007	Partner	Nikki	Hindi	Special appearance
2007	Anamika	Anamika Shroff/Anamika V. Sesodia	Hindi	Special appearance
2007	Santha	Santha's girl friend	Kannada	
2007	Heyy Babyy	Ali's ex-girlfriend	Hindi	Special appearance
2008	Dhoom Dadakka	Shivani Sawant	Hindi	
2008	Chintakayala Ravi	Unnamed	Telugu	Special appearance
2009	Daddy Cool	Nancy Lazarus	Hindi	
2009	Toss	Sasha	Hindi	
2009	Rajani	Sandhya	Kannada	
2009	Kisse Pyaar Karoon	Natasha	Hindi	
2010	Milenge Milenge	Sofiya Rajeev Arora	Hindi	
2010	Dus Tola	Suvarnalata Shastri	Hindi	
2013	Viyah 70 km	Preeto	Punjabi	
2017	Mumbai Varanasi Express	—N/a	Hindi	Director, Producer Short film

=== Television and commercials ===
Year	TV Title	Role	Notes
2011	Fear Factor: Khatron Ke Khiladi 4	Contestant	Winner
2013	Jhalak Dikhhla Jaa 6	Contestant	11th place
2015	Darr Sabko Lagta Hai		Episode 17
2020	Kalika Steel TMT Commercial	Collector Saahiba	
2022	Goldiee Masale Commercial with Salman Khan	Wife	
2026	Prabhuji Laccha with Shah Rukh Khan^{[32]}	Wife	

=== Music video appearances ===
Year	Title	Performer(s)	Album	Ref.
2002	"Roothe Hue Ho Kyon"	Adnan Sami	Tera Chehra	
