= Shagun Sarabhai =

Indian beauty queen

- Born: Shagun Sarabhai; 2 March 1987 (age 38); Mumbai, India
- Height: 1.70 m (5 ft 7 in)
- Beauty pageant titleholder
- Title: Miss India Worldwide 2008

Shagun Sarabhai (born 2 March 1987) is an India beauty queen who won the Miss India Worldwide India 2008 and Miss India Worldwide 2008 pageants, a beauty contest produced by the India Festival Committee (IFC) based in New York.

On 23 February 2008, she was crowned the new Miss India Worldwide 2008 at the finals in Johannesburg, South Africa.

Sarabhai anchored shows on Zoomtv for six months and is currently an anchor on Zing.
