= Nikkitasha Marwaha =

Indian-American model

Nikkitasha Marwaha is an Indian-American model who won Miss India Worldwide 2009 at Durban, South Africa on February 14, 2009. She was a contestant on Dance India Dance season two. She placed First Runner-up on NDTV's Hunt for the Kingfisher Calendar Girl in 2013.

She performed as the assassin 'Mehr' in Anil Kapoor's released 24 (Indian TV series) on Colors.
