= Thayer (surname) =

Thayer (/ˈθɛər/) is an English surname found in Somerset, the name and given name derived from English tawyer, one who dressed skins. Notable people with the surname include:

- Abbott Handerson Thayer (1849–1921), American artist
- Adin Thayer (1816–1890), New York politician
- Alexander Wheelock Thayer (1817–1897), author of The life of Ludwig van Beethoven, a standard biography, and other music biographies
- Albert R. Thayer (1878–1965), painter and etcher
- America Thayer (died 2021), American murder victim
- Amos Madden Thayer (1841–1905), United States federal judge
- Andrew J. Thayer (1818–1873), attorney and legislator
- Bronson Thayer (1939–2016), executive
- Brynn Thayer (born 1949), American actress
- Caroline Matilda Warren Thayer, American educator, novelist and children's writer
- Charles W. Thayer (1910–1969), US military officer, diplomat and author (fiction and non fiction)
- Dale Thayer (born 1980), baseball pitcher
- David Thayer (born 1949), birth name of Teddy Harvia, cartoonist
- Deborah Jinza Thayer, choreographer
- Donnette Thayer, vocalist and guitarist
- Douglas Thayer (1929–2017), American writer
- Edwin Pope Thayer, Secretary of the United States Senate 1925–1933
- Eli Thayer (1819–1899), Kansas politician
- Ella Cheever Thayer (1849–1925), playwright and novelist
- Emma Homan Thayer (1842–1908), American botanical artist and author
- Ernest Thayer (1863–1940), American poet, author of "Casey at the Bat"
- Francis S. Thayer (1822–1880), New York politician
- George Thayer (football player), American football player and businessman (1905–1952)
- George Thayer (writer), American political writer (1933–1973)
- Greg Thayer (born 1949), baseball pitcher
- Harry Thayer (disambiguation), several people
- Helen Thayer, explorer
- Helen Rand Thayer (1863–1935), American social reformer
- Henry W. Thayer (1867–1940), co-founder of the Decorative Designers
- James Thayer (author) (born 1949), thriller writer
- James Thayer (Medal of Honor) (1853–86), United States Navy sailor and Medal of Honor recipient
- James Bradley Thayer (1831–1902), American legal writer and educationist
- James B. Thayer (1922–2018), United States military officer and businessman
- Jeritt Thayer (born 1986), American soccer player
- Jesse B. Thayer (1845–1910), educator
- John Thayer (disambiguation), several people
- Joseph Henry Thayer (1828–1901), American biblical scholar
- Lizzie E. D. Thayer (1857–1923), first female train dispatcher in the US
- Lorna Thayer (1919–2005), American actress
- Maria Thayer (born 1975), American actress/comedian
- Marian Thayer, Titanic survivor
- Martin Russell Thayer (1819–1906), politician
- Max Thayer (born 1946), American movie actor
- Nate Thayer (1960–2023), American journalist who interviewed Pol Pot
- Nathaniel Thayer (1769–1840), minister
- Nathaniel Thayer, Jr. (1808–1883), railroad developer
- Orla Ed Thayer, inventor of the Thayer Valve for trombones
- Otis B. Thayer (1862–1935), American actor, director and film producer
- Pam Thayer, American politician
- Pauline Revere Thayer (1860–1934), benefactor
- Robert H. Thayer (1901–1984), American lawyer, naval officer and diplomat.
- Samuel J. F. Thayer (1842–1893), American architect
- Samuel J. Thayer (born 1976), American wild food forager and author
- Samuel R. Thayer (1837–1909), attorney and diplomat
- Scofield Thayer (1889–1982), American poet and publisher
- Sigourney Thayer (1896–1944), theatrical producer
- Simeon Thayer (1737–1800), American officer of the American Revolutionary War
- Stella F. Thayer (born 1940), president of the National Museum of Racing and Hall of Fame
- Steve Thayer (born 1953), novelist
- Stuart Thayer (1926–2009), American circus historian
- Susan Thayer, American artist
- Sylvanus Thayer (1785–1872), United States general
- Thomas Thayer (1812–1886), theologian
- Tiffany Thayer (1902–1959), founder of the Fortean Society
- Tom Thayer (born 1961), NFL player
- Tommy Thayer (born 1960), lead guitarist of KISS
- W. Paul Thayer (William Paul Thayer, 1919–2010), test pilot
- W. W. Thayer (William Wallace Thayer, 1827–1899), sixth Governor of Oregon
- Wallace Thayer (1866–1944), New York assemblyman
- Webster Thayer (1857–1933), the judge at the trial of Sacco and Vanzetti
- Whitney Eugene Thayer (1838–1889), American organist and composer
- William Thayer (disambiguation), several people

== See also ==
- Thayer David (1927–1978), film and TV actor
- Thayer Munford (born 1999), American football player
- Thayer family, Boston Brahmin and prominent American political family
- Justice Thayer (disambiguation)
