= Lissette (disambiguation) =

Lissette (born March 10, 1947), is a singer, songwriter, and record producer from Cuba. She is best known for recording a Spanish language-version of Bonnie Tyler's "Total Eclipse of the Heart" in 1985.

Lissette may refer to:

== Given names ==
- Lissette Ochoa, victim of the eponymous domestic violence case
- Lissette Martinez (born 1971), the lead electrical engineer for the Space Experiment Module program at the Wallops Flight Facility (WFF)
- Lissette Hanley, fictional character of the Command & Conquer Red Alert 3 video game
- Lissette Garcia (born May 3, 1985), an American television personality and beauty pageant titleholder from Miami, Florida
- Lissette Antes (born 2 May 1991), is Ecuadorian freestyle wrestler
- Lissette Cuza (born 26 February 1975 in Marianao), a retired Cuban athlete who specialized in the long jump
- Lissette Solorzano, a professional photographer born in Santiago de Cuba in 1969
- Lissette Diaz (born 1983), an American actress, model and beauty pageant contestant who represented the United States in Miss World 2005
- Lissette Melendez (born 1967), an American freestyle/Latin pop/dance-pop singer

== Middle names ==
- Marjorie Lissette de Sousa Rivas (born 23 April 1980), a Venezuelan actress and model of Portuguese descent
- Justine Lissette Pasek (born 27 August 1979), a Polish-Panamanian model, philanthropist, and beauty pageant titleholder who was crowned Miss Universe 2002

== Last names ==
- Allen Lissette (6 November 1919 – 24 January 1973), a New Zealand cricketer who played in two Tests in 1956

== See also ==
- Lisette
- Lizette
- Liset
- Lizeth
- Lizzie
