= TLC =

TLC may refer to:

== Arts and entertainment ==
=== Television ===
- TLC (TV series), a 2002 British situational comedy television series that aired on BBC2
- TLC (TV network), formerly the Learning Channel, an American cable TV network
  - TLC (Asia), an Asian television channel
  - TLC (Australian TV channel), the Australian and New Zealand TV channel Travel and Living Channel
  - TLC (French TV channel), a French television channel
  - TLC (German TV channel), a German television channel
  - TLC (India), an Indian television channel
  - TLC (Latin America), a television channel broadcasting to several countries in Latin America
  - TLC (Middle East and North Africa)
  - TLC (Dutch TV channel), a Dutch television channel, which broadcasts lifestyle programs
  - TLC (Poland), a Polish television channel
  - TLC (Swedish TV channel), a Swedish television channel
  - TLC (Turkish TV channel), a Turkish television channel
  - TLC (British and Irish TV channel), a UK and Ireland television channel
  - Discovery Real Time, a former UK television channel originally known as The Learning Channel

=== Music ===
- TLC (group), an American R&B/pop group
  - TLC (album), 2017 album by American R&B/pop group TLC
- "T.L.C.", a song on the album Show Your Hand by the Scottish funk and R&B band Average White Band

=== Sports ===
- Tables, ladders, and chairs match, a type of professional wrestling match
  - WWE TLC: Tables, Ladders & Chairs, a professional wrestling event featuring the above type of match

== Organizations ==
- New York City Taxi and Limousine Commission, a New York City government agency
- Taiwan Lutheran Church, church in Taiwan
- Tasmanian Land Conservancy, Australian non-profit organisation
- The Land Conservancy, a not-for-profit, charitable land trust based in British Columbia, Canada
- The Learning Company, an American educational software company
  - SoftKey, a Canadian shovelware company which acquired The Learning Company and used its name from 1995 to 1999
- TLC Camp, American nonprofit providing summer camp for children with cancer
- Trades and Labor Congress of Canada, the primary labor federation in Canada (1883-1956)
- Transitional Learning Center, a post-acute brain injury rehabilitation facility based in Galveston, Texas
- Transgender Law Center, an American civil-rights organization connecting transgender people to legal services
- True and Living Church of Jesus Christ of Saints of the Last Days, an offshoot of The Church of Jesus Christ of Latter-day Saints
- The Literary Consultancy, a UK-based editorial consultancy service

=== Schools ===
- Thayer Learning Center, a boot camp for teens in Missouri, US
- The Learning Center for the Deaf, a school for the deaf and hard of hearing in Massachusetts, US
- The Lakes College, a private school in Brisbane, Australia

== Science and technology ==
- Technology life cycle, describes the commercial gain of a product through the expense of research and development phase, and the financial return during its "vital life"
- Therapeutic Lifestyle Change, a treatment for depression
- Thin-layer chromatography, a chromatography technique used in chemistry to separate chemical compounds
- Total lung capacity, refers to the volume of air associated with different phases of the respiratory cycle
- Triple-level cell, a type of flash memory
- Tank Landing Craft, a British WWII landing craft, US called Landing craft tank

== Other uses ==
- Toluca International Airport (IATA airport code TLC), Mexico
- Toyota Land Cruiser, an automobile

== See also ==
- Tender Loving Care (disambiguation)
- TLS (disambiguation)
