= Lisette =

Lisette may refer to:

== People ==
- Jean Lisette Aroeste (1932-2020), Star Trek fan who sold scripts to the program
- Lisette de Brinon (1896–1982), the Jewish wife of the pro-Nazi French collaborator, Fernand de Brinon
- Lisette Burrows, New Zealand physical education academic
- Lisette Diaz (born 1983), American actress, model and beauty pageant contestant
- Lisette Dufour (born 1949), Québécoise voice actress, the French voice of Lisa Simpson on The Simpsons
- Lisette Denison Forth (1786–1866), African-American woman from Michigan who was born a slave
- Lisette Kampus (born 1984), Estonian LGBT rights movement activist
- Lisette Kohlhagen (1890–1969), South Australian artist
- Lisette Lanvin (1913–2004), French film actress
- Lisette Lapointe (born 1943), Quebec politician, journalist and teacher
- Gabriel Lisette (1919–2001), Chadian politician, played a key role in the decolonization of Chad
- Lisette Luca of Luca Family Singers, African American singing group in the 19th century
- Lisette Marton or Amélie Le Gall, French competitive cyclist
- Lisette Melendez (born 1967), American freestyle/Latin pop/dance-pop singer
- Lisette Model (1901–1983), Austrian-born American photographer
- Lisette M. Mondello, headed the press offices for U.S. Senators
- Lisette Morelos (born 1978), Mexican actress, singer and model
- Lisette Nieves (born 1970), the founder of "Atrevete Latino Youth, Inc."
- Lisette Oropesa (born 1983), American operatic soprano
- Lisette Pagler, (born 1981), Swedish musical singer and actress
- Lisette de Pillis, American mathematician, chair of the department of mathematics at Harvey Mudd College
- Lisette Pollet (born 1968), French politician
- Lisette Schandein, (1848–1905), the first vice-president of Pabst Brewing Company
- Lisette Schulman (1951–2015), Swedish former television host and politician
- Lisette Sevens (born 1949), retired Dutch field hockey defender, 1984 Summer Olympics gold medallist
- Lisette Stenberg (1770–1847), Swedish stage actress, singer and pianist
- Aurélie Marie-Lisette Talate (1941–2012), Chagossian activist
- Lisette Verea (1914–2003), Romanian-born cabaret singer and actress

== Other ==
- Lisette of Let Them Eat Cake (TV series), British sitcom that aired on BBC One in 1999
- Severe Tropical Storm Lisette (1997), South-West Indian Ocean cyclone
- Tropical Storm Lisette in 1997
- Lisette, a horse of French soldier Marcellin Marbot (1782-1854)

== See also ==
- Liset, given name
- Lissette, given name
- Lizette, given name
- Lizeth, given name
- Glissette
- Louisiette
