= Thayer =

Thayer may refer to:

== Places ==
United States

- Thayer, Illinois
- Thayer, Indiana
- Thayer, Iowa
- Thayer, Kansas
- Thayer, Michigan
- Thayer, Missouri
- Thayer, Nebraska
- Thayer, West Virginia
- Thayer County, Nebraska
- Thayer Street, Providence, Rhode Island
- Thayer Township, Thurston County, Nebraska
- Mount Thayer, a mountain in the Santa Cruz Mountains of California

== Education ==
United States

- Thayer Academy in Braintree, Massachusetts
- Thayer Hall, a Harvard University dormitory
- Thayer Learning Center, Kidder, Missouri
- Thayer School of Engineering, Dartmouth College

== Other ==
- Thayer (name), including a list of people with the name
- Thayer's gull
- Thayer Valve, a valve for trombones
- C.A. Thayer, a schooner preserved at the San Francisco Maritime National Historical Park.

== See also ==
- Justice Thayer (disambiguation)
