= John Thayer =

John Thayer may refer to:

== Politicians ==
- John R. Thayer (1845–1916), member of the United States House of Representatives from Massachusetts
- John A. Thayer (1857–1917), member of the United States House of Representatives from Massachusetts
- John Milton Thayer (1820–1906), United States Senator from Nebraska and Civil War general

== Others ==
- John Thayer (priest) (1755–1815), Boston priest
- John B. Thayer (1862–1912), American cricketer and businessman who died on the RMS Titanic
- Jack Thayer (1894–1945), his son, survivor of the Titanic sinking
- Jack G. Thayer (1922–1995), American radio executive and disc jockey
- John Thayer (ornithologist) (1862–1949), American amateur ornithologist
- John M. Thayer (judge), Connecticut Supreme Court judge

== See also ==
- John Theyer (1597–1673), English royalist lawyer and writer, antiquary and bibliophile
- Thayer (disambiguation)
