= Liset =

Liset is a feminine given name. Notable people with this name include:

- Liset Alea (born 1979), Cuban-born singer
- Liset Castillo (born 1973), Cuban retired basketball player
- Liset Herrera (born 1998), Cuban volleyball player

== See also ==
- Lisets (disambiguation), multiple places in Eastern Europe
- Lisette, given name
- Lissette, given name
- Lizeth, given name
- Lizette, given name
