= Miss California (disambiguation) =

The Miss California competition selects the representative for the state of California in the Miss America competition.

Miss California may also refer to:

- Miss California USA, for the Miss USA pageant
- Miss California Teen USA, for the Miss Teen USA pageant
- Miss California World, for the Miss World America pageant
- Miss California's Outstanding Teen, for in the Miss America's Teen pageant
- "Miss California" (song), 2001 song by Dante Thomas featuring Pras
- Miss California (film), a 2006 Indian film
- "Mrs. California", an episode of the American TV series The Office
