= Bandwagon (magazine) =

Bandwagon is the quarterly journal of the Circus Historical Society (CHS). Originated in 1940 as SPEC, it is still in print today and covers a variety of topics relating to circus history. The magazine was renamed as Bandwagon in 1941. Contributing writers include Stuart Thayer and William L. Slout.

A complete, searchable index of articles is available on the Circus Historical Society website. In June, 2022 the Circus Historical Society released its Bandwagon collection on Internet Archive, with over 500 free, searchable issues dating back to SPEC in 1940. The Internet Archive collection does not contain the most recent three years of Bandwagon, which are embargoed on a members-only site for CHS members as a listed member benefit.
