= Benedict Joseph Labre =

French Roman Catholic saint

Saint Benedict Joseph Labre TOSF
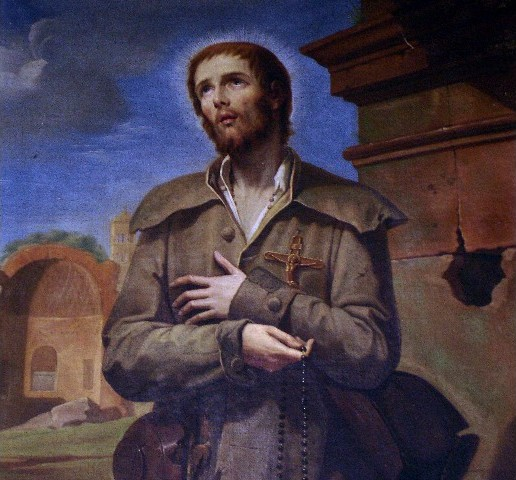
- Born: 26 March 1748; Amettes, Artois, Kingdom of France
- Died: 16 April 1783 (aged 35); Rome, Papal States
- Venerated in: Catholic Church
- Beatified: 20 May 1860, Rome by Pope Pius IX
- Canonized: 8 December 1881, Rome by Pope Leo XIII
- Major shrine: Church of Santa Maria ai Monti, Rome, Italy
- Feast: 16 April
- Attributes: tri-cornered hat; alms
- Patronage: The homeless, those suffering from mental illness

Benedict Joseph Labre, TOSF (French: Benoît-Joseph Labre, 26 March 1748 – 16 April 1783) was a French Franciscan tertiary, and Catholic saint. Labre was from a well-to-do family near Arras, France. After attempting a monastic lifestyle, he opted instead for the life of a pilgrim. He traveled to most of the major shrines of Europe, subsisting by begging. Labre is patron saint of the homeless.

== Life ==
Labre was born on 26 March 1748 in the village of Amettes, near Arras, in the former Province of Artois in the north of France. He was the eldest of fifteen children of a prosperous shopkeeper, Jean-Baptiste Labre, and his wife, Anne Grandsire.

Labre had an uncle, a parish priest, living some distance from his family home, who received Labre and undertook his early education for the priesthood. At the age of 16, he approached his uncle about becoming a Trappist monk, but was rebuffed by his parents, who wanted him to wait until he was older to do so.

When he was about 18, an epidemic struck the city. Labre’s uncle took care of the sick people, while Labre cared for the city's cattle. Among the last victims of the epidemic was Labre's uncle.

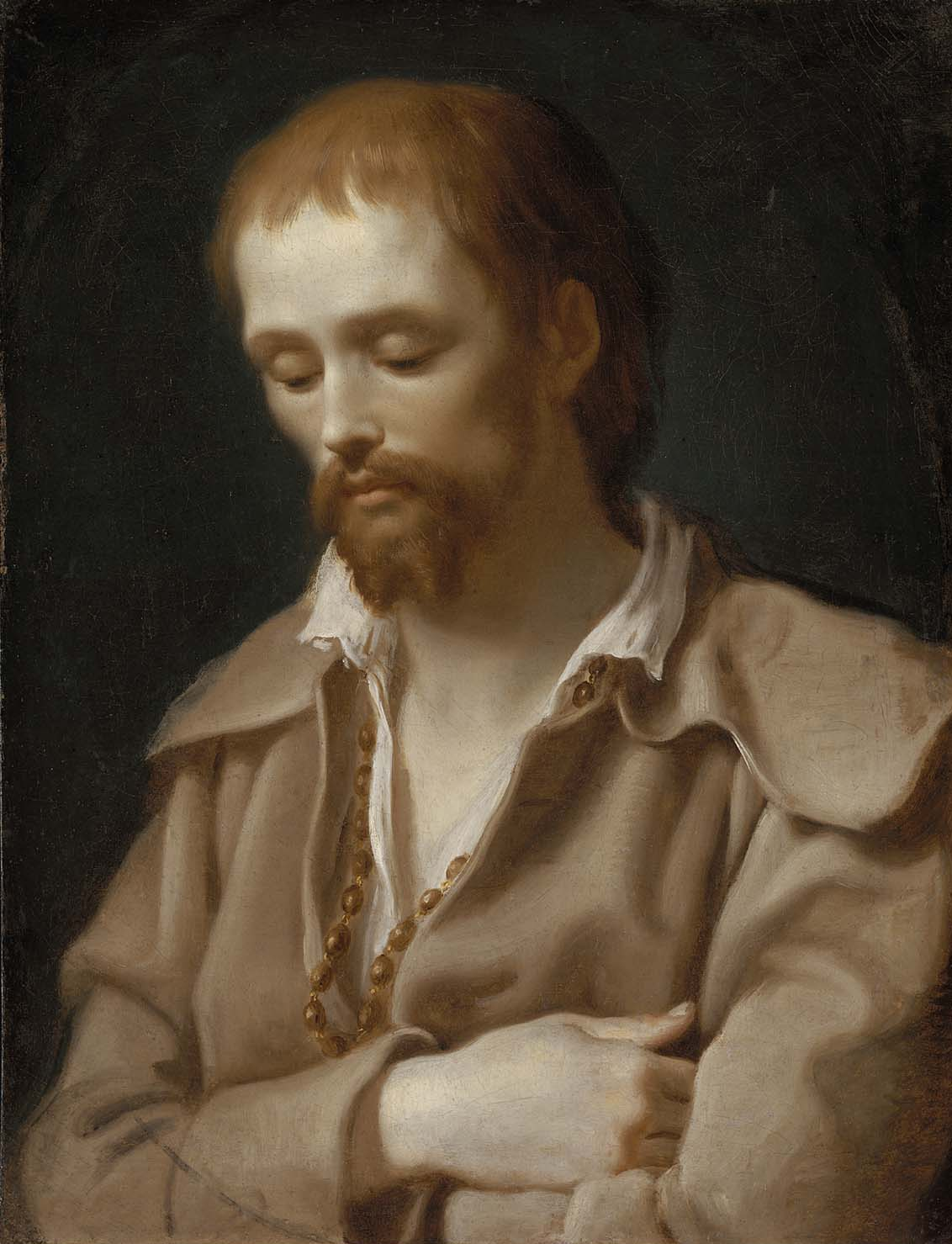
Benedict Joseph Labre depicted by Antonio Cavallucci (1752–1795)

Following the epidemic, Labre set off for La Trappe Abbey to apply to the Trappist Order, but was refused on grounds of being under age, too delicate, and having no special recommendations. He later attempted to join the Carthusians and Cistercians, but each order rejected him as unsuitable for communal life. He was, for about six weeks, a postulant with the Carthusians at Neuville. In November 1769 he obtained admission to the Cistercian Abbey of Sept-Fonts. After a short stay at Sept-Fonts his health gave way, and it was decided that his vocation lay elsewhere.

Labre, according to Catholic tradition, experienced a desire, which he considered was given to him by God and inspired by the example of Alexius of Rome and that of the Franciscan tertiary pilgrim, Saint Roch, to "abandon his country, his parents, and whatever is flattering in the world to lead a new sort of life, a life most painful, most penitential, not in a wilderness nor in a cloister, but in the midst of the world, devoutly visiting as a pilgrim the famous places of Christian devotion."

Labre joined the Third Order of Saint Francis and settled on a life of poverty and pilgrimage. He first traveled to Rome on foot, subsisting on what he could get by begging. He then traveled to most of the major shrines of Europe, often several times each. He visited the various shrines in Loreto, Assisi, Naples, and Bari in Italy, Einsiedeln in Switzerland, Paray-le-Monial in France, and Santiago de Compostela in Spain. During these trips he would always travel on foot, sleeping in the open or in a corner of a room, with his clothes muddy and ragged. On one occasion he stopped at the farmhouse of Matthieu and Marie Vianney, who would later become the parents of St John Vianney, known as the Curé d'Ars. He lived on what little he was given, and often shared the little he did receive with others. He is reported to have talked rarely, prayed often, and accepted quietly the abuse he received.

In so doing, Labre was following in the role of the mendicant, the "Fool-for-Christ," found more often in the Eastern Orthodox Church. Labre spent many hours in adoration of the Blessed Sacrament. He would often swoon when contemplating the crown of thorns, in particular, and, during these states, it is said he would levitate or bilocate. He was also said to have cured some of the other homeless people he met and to have multiplied bread for them. In the last years of his life, he lived in Rome, for a time living in the ruins of the Colosseum, and would leave only to make a yearly pilgrimage to the shrine of Our Lady of Loreto. He was a familiar figure in the city and known as the "saint of the Forty Hours" (or Quarant' Ore) for his dedication to Eucharistic adoration.

The day before he died, Labre collapsed on the steps of the church of Santa Maria ai Monti, blocks from the Colosseum, and despite his protestations was taken to a house behind the church at Via dei Serpenti 2. He died there of malnutrition and exhaustion on 16 April 1783, during Holy Week, and was buried in the Church of Santa Maria ai Monti.

== Veneration ==
Labre's confessor, Marconi, wrote his biography and attributed 136 separate cures to his intercession within three months of his death. Those miracles were instrumental in the conversion of the Reverend John Thayer, the first American Protestant clergyman to convert to Catholicism, who was resident in Rome at the time of St. Benedict's death. A cult grew up around him very soon after his death; he was declared Blessed by Blessed Pius IX in 1860, and canonized by Pope Leo XIII in 1881. Benedict is patron saint of the homeless. His feast day is observed on April 16.

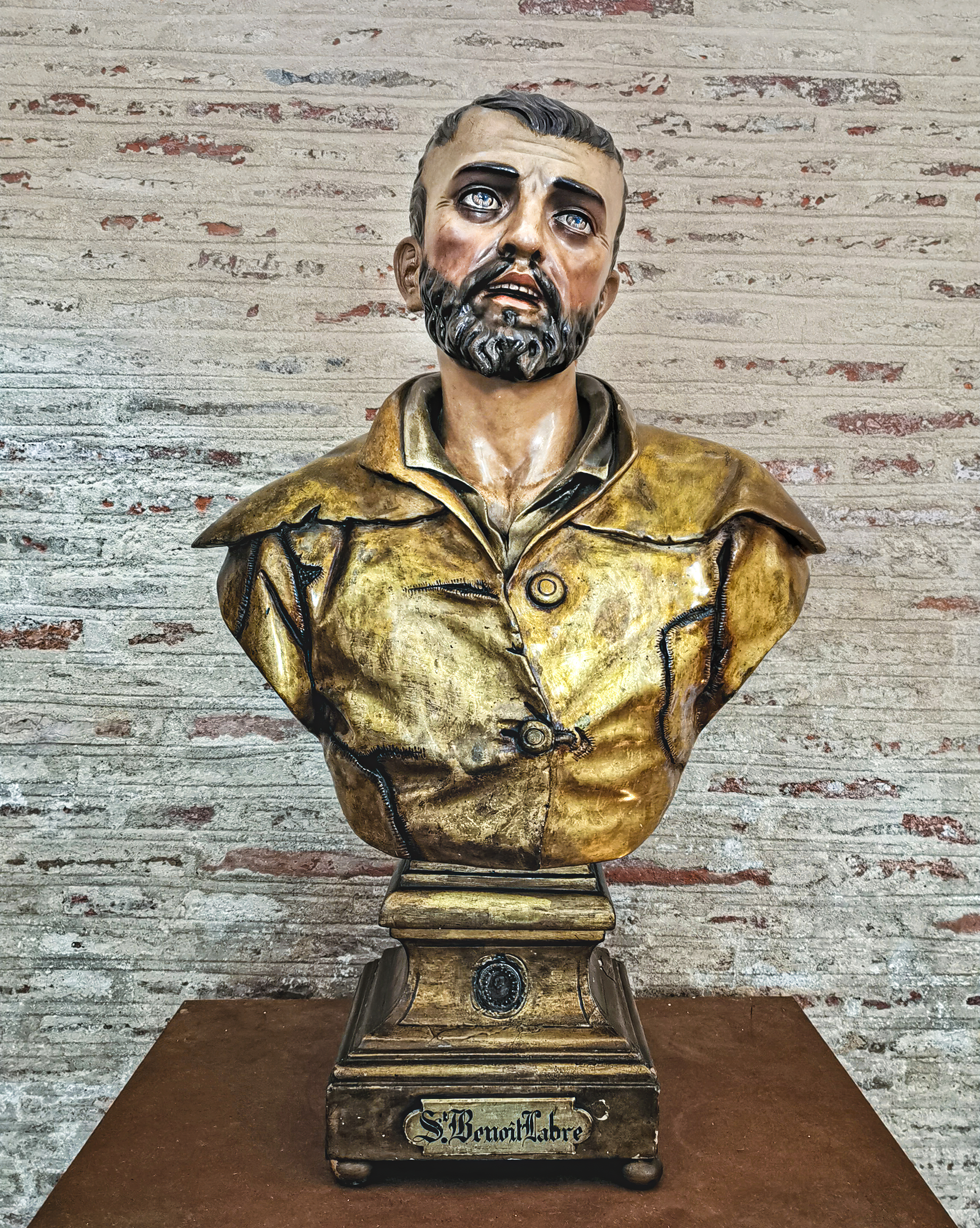
Reliquary bust in Basilica of Saint-Sernin, Toulouse

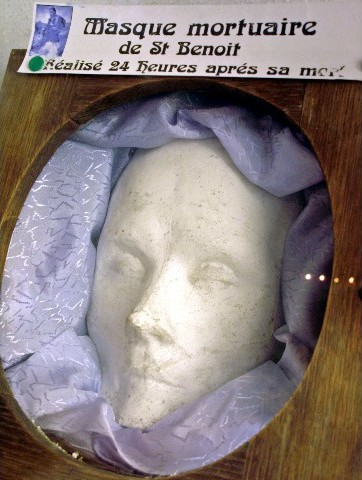
Death mask of Benedict Joseph Labre

== See also ==
- Saint Malachy's Church, Belfast.
- Saint Benedict Joseph Labre Parish, Richmond Hill, New York.
- St. Labre Indian Catholic High School
- Eucharistic adoration
- List of Catholic saints
- Saint Benedict Joseph Labre, patron saint archive
- Benedict Labre House, a lay apostolate in Montreal

== Sources ==
- Attwater, Donald and Catherine Rachel John. The Penguin Dictionary of Saints. 3rd edition. New York: Penguin Books, 1993. ISBN 0-14-051312-4.
- De la Gorce, Agnes. St Benedict Joseph Labre. London: Sheed & Ward, 1952
