= Benedict Labre House =

Lay apostolate in Montreal, Quebec, Canada

The Benedict Labre House is a Montreal based lay apostolate. It is a multipurpose house of hospitality, which serves the wider Montreal English Catholic Community. 3 During the 1950s, Benedict Labre House had close relations with the Patricia House, as well as the Little Sisters of Jesus.

== History ==
Benedict Labre House was founded in October 1952 by, Tony Walsh, Dr. Magnus Seng - a doctor, who ran a free medical clinic in the inner city of Montreal. Jim Shaw - a journalist and teacher at Loyola College. Patricia Conners - a Montreal dramatist and former staff worker at Madonna House Apostolate in Combermere, Ontario and Stephan Hagarty - a young college graduate [...] disenchanted with his new career in advertising. In 1949, Tony Walsh became acquainted with Jim Shaw through his column discussing lay apostolates entitled "Among Ourselves" which had been published in Ensign, a Canadian Catholic Journal. They met and discussed setting up a hospitality house within inner city Montreal. The founding group met every Thursday evening to discuss the possibility of launching a house of hospitality, along with a socially conscious Catholic newspaper. From 1951 to 1952, Tony experienced difficulty trying to support himself while only being able to afford one meal per day, all the while dealing with recurring issues of pneumonia. With Tony's imminent return to the hospital, Magnus Seng called the group into action by placing the house of hospitality as a number one priority. In October 1952, The Benedict Labre House project was launched. The group founded the house project at 418 Lagauchetière, in St. Patrick's ward in downtown Montreal. The House was informally named '418' until its official christening as Benedict Labre House in 1953. They opted not to officially align the project with the Catholic Worker movement due to the inability to determine their mission, mandate, and name. Nevertheless, the group had a strong vision of what the House was to be, thus demonstrating their proximity to discovering their mandate. The centre's philosophy revolves around the innate dignity each human being holds and preaches of respect for servants and those being served.

=== Purpose ===
The focus of the centre was to serve the poor to the best of their abilities. The group collected furniture and beds for the House where homeless men took any available beds or floor space available to them. Tony Walsh was one of the founding group members to voluntarily adopt a lifestyle of poverty. With the personal view that certain individuals of the Christian community were called to follow Christ's word to his followers. Tony Walsh chose to own nothing and live amongst the homeless in the centre. Jim Shaw also lived at the House on a part-time basis. All other members worked and lived outside the House while volunteering their time to the charity. In 1955, Benedict Labre House moved from 418 Lagauchetière to 122 Duke Street for a couple of months followed by its move to 308 Young Street. In 2019, the house moved to 4561 Notre Dame W.

=== Daily life ===
Daily life at the centre consisted of preparing and serving meals, hand washing laundry to prepare beds each night for guests inhabiting the House. There also included a free medical clinic and a free legal clinic, for inhabitants of the House and for the people of the neighbourhood. The house was funded by donations of supporters. The founding group envisioned the House as a home, not as an institution. This home would provide a source of food, clothing and shelter for the poor, where a personal, human, familial atmosphere existed rather than a clinical approach. The poor who came for help were treated with dignity; they were not subject to intake surveys. Such practices confused both the Montreal English Catholic community and the poor, leaving people to wonder if the House was some type of communist venture. The more widely known the House became; the more it received criticism from the Montreal English Catholic community. The criticisms included the House's lack of official Archdiocese recognition, lack of an official name, and lack of an official mission or mandate. Members of the House partook in a democratic voting process in which everyone voiced their preferences. On the day the vote took place, Tony Walsh spoke of Saint Benedict Joseph Labre. Saint Benedict's Life story and scripture was descriptive of the Households philosophy and a unanimous vote agreed to the name of Saint Benedict Joseph Labre. It was decided later however, that the words 'saint' and 'Joseph' would be removed so that it was officially named 'Benedict Labre House' by June 1953.

=== Patricia House ===
November 1954, Marjorie Conners founded the Patricia House, which caters to the needs of transient, marginalized women in Montreal, low-income women and children from Griffintown, an area within Montreal. It was modeled after the Benedict Labre House and is located on Murray Street in Griffintown Montreal. Because of Patricia House, Benedict Labre House extended its hospitality outreach to include marginalized women and children.

== Present day ==
Today, the Benedict Labre House serves up to 55 000 meals per year, and receives upwards of 500 volunteers. Volunteers help the mission function at a high level of operation. The Houses clothing drive extends into basic daily necessities as well, including socks, underwear, shampoo, deodorant and razors to help maintain basic hygiene. The House offers shower facilities every day in which guests may bathe. The House provides a service known as Crisis Intervention and Active Listening, in which basic, in house support is offered to guests suffering from addiction problems, mental illnesses or simply have urgent issues in need of address. The House goes as far to offer extensive referrals to various community resources. Weekly activities are offered at the House including art workshops, music jam sessions, and movie nights. The House offers bimonthly speaking conferences featuring guest speakers.Subjects include prevention of hepatitis C, targeting those who use syringes for various intravenous drugs, and presentations on low income housing. As of recently, mainly during the summer, barbecues have been held where large companies, General Motors for example, bring a variety of food to the Benedict Labre House grounds and employees as well as volunteers grill and serve the guests of the house. The House also offers help putting together annual tax reports for those guests seeking aid. The House publishes a by-annual newsletter called the "UNITY" to update the community with information about the centres current events and relevant informations. Benedict Labre House also offers an array of programs. Programs include a computer learning centre where guests learn how to create a CV, how to use the internet, email, Microsoft Word, Microsoft Publisher, and Microsoft Picture Manager. Yellow Bicycle Repair and Bicycle Shop, operated out of the backyard of the House, teaches hands-on experience in how to repair bicycles and build new ones from old parts. Green Healing, a garden grown in the backyard of the House offers guests an opportunity to help in the growing process of gardens.
