= Harry Thayer =

Harry Thayer may refer to:

- Harry Bates Thayer (1858–1936), businessman
- Harry E. T. Thayer (1927–2017), diplomat
- Harry Irving Thayer (1869–1926), Congressman from Massachusetts
- Harry Thayer (American football, born 1873) (1873–1936), All-American football player
- Harry Thayer (American football executive) (1907–1980), American football executive

== See also ==
- Thayer (disambiguation)
