= Liz =

Liz is a feminine given name. It is often a short form (nickname) of Elizabeth, Elisabeth, Lisbeth, Lizanne, Liszbeth, Lizbeth, Lizabeth, Lyzbeth, Lisa, Lizette, Alyssa, Melissa and Eliza.

== People ==
- Liz (American singer), American singer
- Liz (South Korean singer) (born 2004), member of Ive
- Liz Allan (cricketer) (born 1948), New Zealand Test cricketer
- Liz Allen (born 1969), Irish journalist and novelist
- Liz Balmaseda (born 1959), Cuban-American writer and journalist
- Liz Barker (born 1975), British television presenter
- Liz Berry (poet) (born 1980), British poet
- Liz Berry (politician) (born 1983), American politician from Washington
- Liz Bonnin (born 1976), Irish television presenter
- Liz Brown (politician), American politician first elected to the Indiana Senate in 2014
- Liz Brown, backing vocalist for Wheatus
- Liz Cambage (born 1991), Australian basketball player in the Israeli Female Basketball Premier League
- Liz Cho, American journalist
- Liz Claiborne (1929–2007), American fashion designer
- Liz Dixon (born 2000), American basketball player
- Liz Fraser, stage name of English actress Elizabeth Joan Winch (1930–2018)
- Liz Friedman, American television producer and television writer
- Liz Hyder, English author
- Liz Carolina Jaramillo (born 1981), Venezuelan politician
- Liz Kershaw (born 1958), English radio broadcaster
- Liz Kendall (born 1971), British politician
- Liz Krueger (born 1957), American politician
- Liz Lochhead (born 1947), Scottish poet, playwright, translator and broadcaster
- Liz Mace, half of the American country/pop duo Megan and Liz
- Liz María Márquez, Venezuelan politician
- Liz McClarnon (born 1981), English pop singer, dancer and television presenter
- Liz Mills, Australian basketball coach
- Liz Oates, American politician
- Liz Phair (born 1967), American singer, songwriter and guitarist
- Liz Sandals (born c. 1947), Canadian politician elected in 2003
- Liz Saville Roberts (born 1965), Welsh politician and Member of Parliament
- Liz Schepers (born 1999), American ice hockey player
- Liz Sharman (born 1957), British slalom and sprint canoeist
- Liz Smith (actress) (1921–2016), English character actress
- Liz Smith (journalist) (1923–2017), American gossip columnist
- Liz Specht, American research scientist specializing in chemical engineering and synthetic biology
- Liz Thomas (born 1987), American hiker
- Liz Torres (born 1947), American actress, singer and comedian
- Liz Truss (born 1975), British politician, Prime Minister of the United Kingdom for 50 days in 2022
- Liz Twist (born 1956), Labour MP Blaydon
- Liz White (actress) (born 1979), English actress
- Liz White (activist) (born c. 1950), Canadian animal rights activist
- Liz Mitchell (born 1952), former Boney M. lead singer and vocalist

== Fictional characters ==
- Liz Adams, on the American television series Dallas
- Liz Allan, a Marvel Comics character
- Liz Anya, a Raven disguise from a season 1 episode of That’s So Raven who later appears as a real person in Raven's Home
- Liz Burton, on the British soap opera Hollyoaks
- Liz Chandler, on the soap opera Days of Our Lives
- Liz Danes, a recurring character on Gilmore Girls
- Liz Lemon, main character of the American television series 30 Rock
- Liz McDonald, on the British soap opera Coronation Street
- Liz Parker, protagonist of the Roswell High book series and the Roswell television series
- Liz Shaw, on the British science fiction television series Dr. Who
- Liz Sherman, a Dark Horse Comics character associated with Hellboy
- Liz Topham-Myrtle, antagonist of the 2023 film Hemet, or the Landlady Don't Drink Tea
- Dr. Liz Wilson, in the Garfield franchise
- Liz, from the video games series Crash Bandicoot, first introduced in Crash Team Racing

== See also ==
- Lizzie / Lizzy
