= Kidder, Missouri =

- City
- Location of Kidder, Missouri
- Coordinates: 39°46′56″N 94°06′08″W
- Country: United States
- State: Missouri
- County: Caldwell

Area
  - Total: 0.40 sq mi (1.04 km^{2})
  - Land: 0.40 sq mi (1.04 km^{2})
  - Water: 0 sq mi (0.00 km^{2})
- Elevation: 1,027 ft (313 m)

Population (2020)
  - Total: 267
  - Density: 663.6/sq mi (256.22/km^{2})
- Time zone: UTC-6 (Central (CST))
  - Summer (DST): UTC-5 (CDT)
- ZIP code: 64649
- Area code: 816
- FIPS code: 29-38522
- GNIS feature ID: 2395526

Kidder is a city in northwest Caldwell County, Missouri. The population was 267 at the 2020 census.

The city was laid out in 1860 by H.B. Kidder or (Henry P. Kidder), of the Kidder Land Company in Boston, which was seeking to encourage non-slave owning European immigrants to settle along the Hannibal and St. Joseph Railroad which at the time was the furthest west railroad in the United States.

The city received national publicity in 2004 after a student at the Thayer Learning Center in the community died after not receiving treatment early enough. In 2009 the Center was sold to become the White Buffalo Academy. The campus was formerly Thayer College and Thayer High School. Thayer College was founded in 1871 and closed in 1876. It reopened in 1877 as the Kidder Institute and operated under the auspices of the Congregational Church of Missouri. The building was used as a public school from 1934 to 1981.

== Geography ==
According to the United States Census Bureau, the city has a total area of 0.40 square miles (1.04 km^{2}), all land.

== Demographics ==
Historical population
Census	Pop.	Note	%±
1880	260		—
1890	322		23.8%
1900	357		10.9%
1910	306		−14.3%
1920	335		9.5%
1930	314		−6.3%
1940	270		−14.0%
1950	222		−17.8%
1960	224		0.9%
1970	231		3.1%
1980	265		14.7%
1990	241		−9.1%
2000	271		12.4%
2010	323		19.2%
2020	267		−17.3%
U.S. Decennial Census

=== 2010 census ===
As of the census of 2010, there were 323 people, 121 households, and 88 families residing in the city. The population density was 807.5 inhabitants per square mile (311.8/km^{2}). There were 132 housing units at an average density of 330.0 per square mile (127.4/km^{2}). The racial makeup of the city was 96.9% White, 0.6% from other races, and 2.5% from two or more races. Hispanic or Latino of any race were 0.6% of the population.

There were 121 households, of which 34.7% had children under the age of 18 living with them, 60.3% were married couples living together, 9.1% had a female householder with no husband present, 3.3% had a male householder with no wife present, and 27.3% were non-families. 24.8% of all households comprised individuals, and 13.2% had someone living alone who was 65 years of age or older. The average household size was 2.67 and the average family size was 3.15.

The median age in the city was 40.9 years. 26.9% of residents were under the age of 18; 7.1% were between the ages of 18 and 24; 20.8% were from 25 to 44; 29.6% were from 45 to 64; and 15.5% were 65 years of age or older. The gender makeup of the city was 50.5% male and 49.5% female.

=== 2000 census ===
As of the census of 2000, there were 271 people, 109 households, and 79 families residing in the city. The population density was 663.7 inhabitants per square mile (256.3/km^{2}). There were 119 housing units at an average density of 291.5 per square mile (112.5/km^{2}). The racial makeup of the city was 99.26% White, 0.37% African American, and 0.37% from two or more races. Hispanic or Latino of any race were 2.95% of the population.

There were 109 households, out of which 33.9% had children under the age of 18 living with them, 57.8% were married couples living together, 9.2% had a female householder with no husband present, and 27.5% were non-families. 27.5% of all households were made up of individuals, and 13.8% had someone living alone who was 65 years of age or older. The average household size was 2.49 and the average family size was 3.01.

In the city the population was spread out, with 28.4% under the age of 18, 6.6% from 18 to 24, 23.2% from 25 to 44, 28.8% from 45 to 64, and 12.9% who were 65 years of age or older. The median age was 38 years. For every 100 females, there were 90.8 males. For every 100 females age 18 and over, there were 90.2 males.

The median income for a household in the city was $26,771, and the median income for a family was $41,477. Males had a median income of $26,818 versus $18,906 for females. The per capita income for the city was $13,424. About 15.6% of families and 22.1% of the population were below the poverty line, including 41.8% of those under the age of eighteen and 5.3% of those 65 or over.

== Education ==
It is in the Hamilton R-II School District.
