= Lisec =

Lisec or Lisets may refer to:

== Places ==
=== Bulgaria ===
- Lisets, Kyustendil Province
- Lisets, Lovech Province
- Lisets (mountain), mountain range

=== North Macedonia ===
- Lisec, a village in Tetovo Municipality

=== Slovenia ===
- Lisec, Tolmin, a settlement in the Municipality of Tolmin
- Lisec, Trebnje, a settlement in the Municipality of Trebnje

== People ==
- Eva Lisec (born 1995), Slovenian basketball player
