= Lizeth =

Lizeth is a feminine given name. Notable people with the name include:

- Lizeth González (born 1986), Colombian model
- Lizeth Rueda (born 1994), Mexican swimmer
- Lizeth López (born 1990), Mexican volleyball player
- Lizeth Mahecha (born 1970), Colombian lawyer

== See also ==
- Liset, given name
- Lisette, given name
- Lissette, given name
- Lizette, given name
