= Miss California World =

Beauty pageant

- Formation: 1951
- Type: Beauty pageant
- Headquarters: Costa Mesa
- Location: California
- Members: Miss World America (1951–present)
- Official language: English
- State Director: Diane Schmidt
- Website: Official Website

Miss California World is an American state beauty pageant that selects a representative for the Miss World America national competition from the State of California. The pageant is headquartered in Costa Mesa, Orange County, and is currently directed by Diane Schmidt, who serves as State Director.

To date, ten women from California have been crowned Miss World America:

- Amedee Chabot, 1962
- Pamela Valari Pall, 1967
- Diana Magaña, 1988
- Shauna Gene Gambill, 1998
- Natasha Allas, 1999
- Angelique Sue Breaux, 2000
- Lisette Diaz, 2005
- Lisa-Marie Kohrs, 2009
- Claudine Elsa Book, 2012
- Athenna Michaela Crosby, 2024

== Winners ==
Color key

- Declared as Winner/Ended as Miss World America
- Ended as runner-up
- Ended as one of the finalists or semifinalists
- Ended as special awards winner
- Ended as Miss USA

Year	Name	Hometown	Age (Note: Age at the time of the Miss World America pageant)	Placement at Miss World America	Special awards at Miss World America	Notes
2020	Melanie Wardhana	San Francisco	26	Top 10		Previously Miss Asian America 2019.
2019	Manju Bangalore	Los Angeles/Corvallis, OR	22	Top 10		Previously Miss Oregon World 2018 and Top 10 at Miss World America 2018. Later Miss Oregon World 2020, Top 10 at Miss World America 2020, Miss Oregon USA 2023, and competed in Miss USA 2023 but unplaced.
2018	Raquel Basco		23	1st Runner-Up		
2018	Yasmin Ashir		25	Top 10		
2017	Katerina Villegas	Chino	24	Top 16		Later Miss Oregon USA 2020 and competed in Miss USA 2020 but unplaced.
2016	Salisha Thomas	Los Angeles	21	Unplaced	Talent	
2015	Isela Vasquez	San Pedro	18	Top 22		
Miss California United States 2014
2014	Brandy Fisher					
Miss California World
2013	No titleholders as Miss World America was designated from 2006 to 2013.					
2012	No titleholders as Miss World America was designated from 2006 to 2013.					
2011	No titleholders as Miss World America was designated from 2006 to 2013.					
2010	No titleholders as Miss World America was designated from 2006 to 2013.					
2009	No titleholders as Miss World America was designated from 2006 to 2013.					
2008	No titleholders as Miss World America was designated from 2006 to 2013.					
2007	No titleholders as Miss World America was designated from 2006 to 2013.					
2006	No titleholders as Miss World America was designated from 2006 to 2013.					
2005	Lisette Diaz	Chula Vista	22	US Miss World 2005		Unplaced at Miss World 2005.
2004	No known representatives from California between 2003 and 2004.					
2003	No known representatives from California between 2003 and 2004.					
2002	No titleholders as Miss World America was designated from 1995 to 2002.					
2001	No titleholders as Miss World America was designated from 1995 to 2002.					
2000	No titleholders as Miss World America was designated from 1995 to 2002.					
1999	No titleholders as Miss World America was designated from 1995 to 2002.					
1998	No titleholders as Miss World America was designated from 1995 to 2002.					
1997	No titleholders as Miss World America was designated from 1995 to 2002.					
1996	No titleholders as Miss World America was designated from 1995 to 2002.					
1995	No titleholders as Miss World America was designated from 1995 to 2002.					
1994	Angi Aylor			2nd Runner-Up		
1993	Patricia Sturla					
1992	Shannon Stone			Top 10		
Miss California USA 1981-1991
1991	Diane Schock	Fontana	24	2nd Runner-Up		
1990	Cynthia Nelson	Gilroy				
1989	Christina Maria Faust	San Fernando Valley	23	Top 10		
1988	Diana Magaña	Rancho Palos Verdes	22	Miss World USA 1988		Top 10 semifinalist at Miss World 1988.
1987	Lori Dickerson	Lodi			Miss Congeniality	
1986	Kelly Parsons	Los Angeles	22	4th Runner-Up		Mouseketeer, Model and Actress
1985	Zina Ponder	Long Beach				
1984	Theresa Ring	San Diego				1987 Star Search spokesmodel
1983	Julie Lynne Hayek	Westwood	22	Miss USA 1983		Later 1st Runner-Up at Miss Universe 1983, has starred in Dallas, Twin Peaks and As the World Turns; Future actress Mariska Hargitay placed 4th Runner-Up in this competition
1982	Suzanne Dewames	Thousand Oaks				
1981	Cynthia Kerby	Westlake Village		3rd Runner-Up	Miss Photogenic & Miss Congeniality	First woman to win Miss Photogenic & Miss Congeniality at Miss USA
Miss California World
1980	Kelly Bailey			Top 8		
1979	Ramona Henriette Rolle			2nd Runner-Up		
1978	Linda Howerton			Top 8		
1977	Melissa Prophet					
1976	Leila Pauschek					
1975	Debra Reichter			Semi-Finals		
1974	Susan Elaine Palmer					
1973	Toni Tuso					
1972	Rochelle A. Wallace			Semi-Finals		
1971	Darlene Poole			Top 18		
1970	Seelchen Sund			4th Runner-Up		
1969	Vickie Ann Siggers					
1968	Diane Dye			3rd Runner-Up		Competed as California.
1968	Karen Dumouchelle	Los Angeles				Competed as Los Angeles, California.
1967	Pamela Valari Pall	Norwalk	20	Miss World USA 1967		Competed as California. Top 15 semi-finalist at Miss World 1967.
1967	Susan Lee Glicksman	Los Angeles		4th Runner-Up		Competed as Los Angeles, California.
1966	Alexa Clark					Competed as California.
1966	Gigi Dahl	Los Angeles		3rd Runner-Up (tied)		Competed as Los Angeles, California.
1965	Darlene Louise Ermis					Competed as California.
1964	Diana Dean			Top 15		Competed as California.
1964	Eddi Zippi	Los Angeles		Top 15		Competed as Los Angeles, California.
1964	Susan Arnell	San Francisco				Competed as San Francisco, California.
1963	Shari Roark			Top 15		Competed as California.
1963	Annette Allen	Los Angeles				Competed as Los Angeles, California.
1962	Amedee Chabot	Los Angeles	17	Miss USA World 1962		Competed as California. Top 8 finalist at Miss World 1962.
1962	Linda Pauline Kennon	Los Angeles		3rd Runner-Up		Competed as Los Angeles, California.
1961	Marlena Loren	Los Angeles		2nd Runner-Up		Competed as California.
1960	Gail Stevens					Competed as California.
1960	Gail Shapiro	Beverly Hills				Competed as Beverly Hills, California
1959	No known representatives from California between 1958 and 1959.					
1958	No known representatives from California between 1958 and 1959.					
Miss California USA 1953-1957
1957	Peggy Jacobson	Los Angeles		Top 15		
1956	Shirlee Witty	Los Angeles				
1955	Donna Schurr	Los Angeles		3rd Runner-Up		
1954	Sandra Constance	Los Angeles		Top 20		
1953	Marcella Roulette	Los Angeles		Top 20		
Miss California World
1952	No known representatives from California between 1951 and 1952.					
1951	No known representatives from California between 1951 and 1952.					

Notes to table
