= Lizzie =

Lizzie or Lizzy is a diminutive form of Elizabeth, sometimes given as an independent name in the United States, especially in the late 19th century.

Lizzie can also be the shortened version of Lizeth, Lissette or Lizette.

== People ==
- Elizabeth Sewall Alcott (1835–1858), real-life model for the character Beth March in the novel Little Women
- Marie Elisabeth Lizzy Ansingh (1875–1959), Dutch painter
- Lizzie Arlington, alias of Elizabeth Stroud, regarded by many historians as the first female to play organized baseball in the 19th century
- Lizzie Arnot (born 1996), Scottish footballer
- Elizabeth Mary Lizzie Deignan (née Armitstead) (born 1988), world champion British track and road racing cyclist
- Lizzy Bardsley (born 1973), English media and television personality
- Elizabeth Bolden (1890–2006), world's oldest person at the time of her death
- Lizzie Borden (1860–1927), tried and acquitted for the notorious murder of her parents
- Elizabeth Anne Lizzy Caplan (born 1982), American actress
- Lizzie Compton (1847–?), woman who disguised herself as a man in order to fight for the Union in the American Civil War
- Lizzie Petit Cutler (1831–1902), writer
- Elisabeth Carolina Lizzy van Dorp (1872–1945), Dutch lawyer, economist, politician and feminist
- Lizzie May Elwyn, American playwright
- Lizzie Evans (1864 or 1865 – ?), American vaudeville and musical theatre entertainer
- Lizzie Fletcher (born 1975), American politician
- Lizzie Freeman (born 1992), American voice actress
- Margaret Elizabeth Lizzie Crozier French (1851–1926), American educator, women's suffragist and social reform activist
- Lizzy, former stage name of Park Soo-ah (born 1992), former member of Kpop girl group After School
- Lizzy Gardiner (born 1966), Australian Academy Award-winning costume designer
- Lizzy Greene (born 2003), American actress
- Elizabeth Lizzie Greenwood-Hughes, English television presenter
- Lizzie Grey, stage name of Stephen Perry, American rock guitarist
- Lizzie Grubman (born 1971), American publicist
- Lizzie George Henderson (1863–1937), American clubwoman and philanthropist
- Lizzie Holmes (1850–1926), American anarchist, editor
- Lizzie Hopley, British actress and writer
- Lizzie Halliday (1859–1918), Irish-American serial killer
- Elizabeth Jane Lizzy Igasan (born 1982), field hockey defender from New Zealand
- Lizzie Kiama, Kenyan disability rights activist
- Emilie Augusta Louise Lizzy Lind af Hageby (1878–1963), Swedish feminist and animal rights advocate
- Elizabeth Lizzy Lovette, Australian radio presenter and TV presenter
- Lizzie Lloyd King (1847–?), American alleged murderer
- Elizabeth Magie (1866–1948), inventor of a predecessor of the game of Monopoly
- Martine-Elizabeth Lizzy Mercier Descloux (1956–2004), French singer and musician, writer and painter
- Elizabeth Lizzie Mickery, British writer and former actress
- Lizzie Miles (1895–1963), stage name of Elizabeth Mary Landreaux, African American blues singer
- Lizzy Pattinson, English singer and songwriter
- Elizabeth Siddal (1829–1862), English artists' model, poet and artist
- Lizzie Shabalala, South African politician
- Lizzie Caswall Smith (1870–1958), British photographer
- Lizzie E. D. Thayer (1857–1923), first female train dispatcher in the US
- Elizabeth Ann Lizzie Velásquez (born 1989), American motivational speaker, author, and YouTuber
- Lizzie Webb, often known as Mad Lizzie, English television presenter of exercise routines
- Lizzie West (born 1973), American singer/songwriter
- Lizzy Yarnold (born 1988), British skeleton racer
- Lizzie Yu Der Ling (1885–1944), better known as Princess Der Ling, Chinese-American writer of several memoirs
- Lizzie van Zyl (1894–1901), South African child inmate of the Bloemfontein concentration camp during the Second Boer War

== Fictional characters ==
- Elizabeth Bennet, from Jane Austen's Pride and Prejudice, often called Lizzy by her friends and family
- Lizzie, the title character of Lizzie McGuire, a Disney Channel television series
- Lizzie, the title character of the 2000 children's novel Lizzie Zipmouth
- Lizzie, a character in the Irish television drama Love/Hate
- Lizzie (Cars), a female car from the Disney Pixar animated film Cars and its two sequels
- Lizzie Devine, in Codename: Kids Next Door
- Lizzie Griffiths, a nine-year-old girl from the movie Tinker Bell and the Great Fairy Rescue
- Lizzie Hearts, the teenage daughter of the Queen of Hearts from the Mattel franchise Ever After High
- Lizzie Lakely, from the British soap opera Emmerdale
- Lizzie Birdsworth, from the Australian soap opera Prisoner (also titled Prisoner: Cell Block H)
- Lizzie McDonald, from the television series Life with Derek
- Lizzie Ramesy, a pirate from the video game Age of Empires III
- Lizzie Saltzman, a witch and one of the daughters of Alaric Saltzman from the TV series Legacies
- Lizzie Samuels, a young psychotic girl from the TV series The Walking Dead
- Lizzie Sparkes, a veterinarian and supporting character in the animated series Fireman Sam
- Lizzie Spaulding, from the American soap opera Guiding Light
- Lizzy, from the Midway arcade game series Rampage
- Lizzy (South Park)
- Lizzy Taylor, a girl character that uses a wheelchair in Postman Pat
- Lizzy Watson, the twin sister of Nicki Watson from the 2013 horror film Carrie
- Lizzie, a giant crocodile monster from video game Rampage

== Films ==
- Lizzie (1957 film), film noir about woman with multiple personalities
- Lizzie (2018 film), biographical thriller film based on Lizzie Borden

== Other uses ==
- Lizzie (elephant), elephant used as draft animal during WW1
- Lizzie (mascot), mascot of the 2000 Paralympics
- The Lizzie, informal name for the Elizabeth line, a railway line in London
- Westlothiana or Lizzie the Lizard, a fossil discovered in Bathgate, West Lothian

== See also ==
- Liz
