= Tender loving care =

Tender Loving Care may refer to:

- Tender, Loving Care, a 1984 novel written by Andrew Neiderman
  - Tender Loving Care (video game), a 1998 interactive movie based on the novel, re-released in 2012
- Tender Loving Care (1974 film), a film about the adventures of three nurses
- Tender Loving Care (2026 film), an upcoming film written and directed by Mike Leigh
- Tender Loving Care (Nancy Wilson album), 1967
- Tender Loving Care (Tom Jones album), 1985
- "Tender Loving Care" (Backup), a 1995 television episode

== See also ==
- TLC (disambiguation)
