= Lizette =

Lizette is a female given name that may refer to:

- Lizette Alvarez (born 1964), American journalist
- Lizette Cabrera (born 1997), Australian tennis player
- Lizette Carrión (born 1972), American actress
- Lizette Etsebeth (born 1963), South African discus thrower
- Lizette Parker (1971–2016), American politician and social worker
- Lizette Salas (born 1989), American professional golfer
- Lizette Santana (born 1980), American singer-songwriter, record producer and actress known as Lizé
- Lizette Thorne (1882–1970), English-born silent film actress
- Lizette Woodworth Reese (1856–1935), American poet
- Georgette Lizette Withers (1917–2011), British entertainer

== See also ==
- Lisette, given name
- Lissette, given name
- Lizeth, given name
- Liset, given name
- Elizabeth (given name), related name
- Liz, related name
- The Innocence of Lizette, 1916 American silent comedy-drama film
