= Judge Thayer (disambiguation) =

Webster Thayer (1857–1933) was a judge of the Superior Court of Massachusetts. Judge Thayer may also refer to:

- Amos Madden Thayer (1841–1905), judge of the United States Court of Appeals for the Eighth Circuit
- Rufus Thayer (1850–1917), judge of the United States Court for China

== See also ==
- Justice Thayer (disambiguation)
