= Lisette Nieves =

Puerto Rican businesswoman

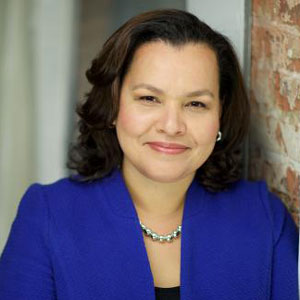
- Education: Brooklyn College (BA); University of Oxford (BA, MA); Princeton University (MPA); University of Pennsylvania (Ed.D.)
- Occupations: Non-profit executive, professor, public official

Lisette Nieves is an American academic, non-profit leader, and public official. She is the president of the Fund for the City of New York and a Distinguished Clinical Instructor with New York University. In July 2022, she became a U.S. Senate-confirmed member of the board of directors of AmeriCorps.

== Early life and education ==
Nieves was born and raised in Brooklyn, New York, and graduated from John Dewey High School. She received her B.A. from Brooklyn College in 1992, and while an undergraduate she spent time studying at the London School of Economics as a Harry S. Truman Scholarship.

As a Rhodes Scholar she earned a B.A./M.A. from the University of Oxford in 1994, and then returned to the United States to earn a master's degree in public administration from Princeton University. She went on to earn a master's degree in public affairs and domestic politics from the Woodrow Wilson School at Princeton University, and an executive doctorate (Ed.D.) in Higher Education Management at the University of Pennsylvania.

== Career ==
While in college, Nieves worked with Hispanic adults in Brooklyn on adult literacy, and volunteered to help address issues of homelessness and poverty.

Following her time at the University of Oxford, Nieves moved to Washington, D.C. where she worked for the Corporation for National and Communication Services, a federal agency in Washington, D.C.

She then worked for The After School Corporation, and from 2002 until 2004, she was the chief of staff in New York City's Department of Youth and Community Development office. She was the founding executive director of Year Up, a program that centered on workplace development.

In 2011, while she was a social entrepreneur-in-residence at the Blue Ridge Foundation, Barack Obama appointed her to the President's Advisory Commission on Educational Excellence for Hispanics, where she served as a commissioner.

On July 30, 2021, Nieves was nominated as a member of the board of directors of AmeriCorps, a position that was confirmed by the United States Senate in July 2022.

In 2020 Nieves was named president of the Fund for the City of New York. As of 2022 she is also a Distinguished Clinical Instructor with New York University.

== Selected works ==
- Anderson, N., & Nieves, L. (2020). Working to learn: Disrupting the divide between college and career pathways for young people. Pal-grave MacMillan. book/10.1007%2F978-3-030-35350-6
- Nieves, L. (Fall 2021). "I Need You to See All of Me: Latinx Students from Mixed-Immigration-Status Families Speak Out on School and Work Roles and Offer Lessons for Latinx Community College Leaders". Journal of Applied Research in the Community College. 28 (2): 1–16.

== Awards and honors ==
In 1991 Nieves was named a Rhodes Scholar, thereby becoming the first person from Brooklyn College to receive this honor, the second person from the City University of New York and the first Puerto Rican woman. In March 1992, she was one of several women honored by the New York City chapter of the National Conference of Puerto Rican Women for their "contributions in helping Puerto Rican females make history."

In 2008, the Robin Hood Foundation named her one of their '2008 Heroes', which included a $50,000 grant for her work with Year Up, a program supporting the education and employment of urban youth.

== See also ==
- List of Puerto Ricans
