= John Thayer (priest) =

American Catholic priest

The Reverend John Thayer
- Church: Catholic Church

Orders
- Ordination: 1789

Personal details
- Born: 1755 Boston, Province of Massachusetts Bay
- Died: February 17, 1815 (aged 59–60) Limerick, County Limerick, Ireland
- Buried: Limerick, County Limerick, Ireland
- Education: Yale College

Ordination history of John Thayer
History
Priestly ordination
- Date: 1789
- Place: Paris, France

John Thayer (1755 – 17 February 1815) was the first native of New England ordained to the Roman Catholic priesthood. He was born in Boston, Massachusetts. Thayer was educated at Yale College and was a Protestant in his early life. He was ordained as a Congregationalist minister and served as a chaplain during the American Revolutionary War. While visiting Rome in 1783, he converted to the Roman Catholic faith, an act which caused a sensation in New England at the time. He credited his conversion to miracles attributed to the noted mendicant, Saint Benedict Joseph Labre, who lived and died there in that period.

Thayer studied for the priesthood with the Sulpician order in Paris, where he was ordained in 1789. Upon his return to Boston, he established a small chapel in School Street, primarily for French Catholics.

After a brief stint serving the Catholic community of Boston, he left to serve the scattered Catholics of Virginia and Kentucky. He had a rather checkered career mostly because of his erratic and confrontational temperament. In 1803, he returned to Europe and finally settled in Limerick, Ireland, United Kingdom where he was much more successful in his ministry. He died there in 1815.

After his death, his estate was used to found an Ursuline convent on Mount Benedict in Charlestown, Massachusetts. It was founded by the three daughters of the family with whom he lived while in Limerick. The first convent to be established in New England, it was burned down by a nativist crowd in anti-Catholic rioting in 1834.

== Sources ==
- Herbermann, Charles, ed. (1913). "John Thayer". Catholic Encyclopedia. New York: Robert Appleton Company.
- An Account of the Conversion of the Reverend John Thayer
