= Albert R. Thayer =

American painter

Albert Rufus Thayer (19 October 1878 - October 1965) was an American artist and educator. As a multidisciplinary artist, he worked primarily in the mediums of painting, etching, and illustration. Born in Concord, Massachusetts, he studied at the Boston Museum School and at the Art Students League in New York City. His teachers included Edmund Tarbell, Eric Pape and Aldro Hibbard. Thayer was a longstanding member of the Rockport Art Association, where he served as a treasurer.

His work is included in the permanent Museum Collection of the Rockport Art Association and was featured in a traveling exhibition titled 'Images of a New England Seacoast' 1900–1950. He provided the illustration for the American edition of a popular Christmas book, The Man at the Gate of the World. He also provided the illustrations for the book, The Mystery of Molly Mott. He is best known for marshy landscapes and harbor scenes, but on occasion, he painted a Boston house that caught his fancy. His work, primarily his oil paintings, occasionally appear at auction and at private sales.

He painted a portrait of Rose Fitzgerald Kennedy.

== Works by Albert Rufus Thayer ==
- Street Scene, France
- Putting up the Sails
- Old Ice House
