= Stuart Thayer =

American historian

Stuart LeRoy Thayer
- Thayer in Paris in 1984
- Born: March 27, 1926; Ann Arbor, Michigan, US
- Died: June 24, 2009 (aged 83)
- Education: University of Michigan
- Occupations: Historian and author
- Spouse: Boyka Thayer

Stuart LeRoy Thayer (March 27, 1926 – June 24, 2009) was a historian of American circuses.

== Biography ==
Stuart Thayer was born on March 27, 1926, in Ann Arbor, Michigan, to Louise and Lyle O. Thayer (1901–1968). Thayer served in World War II after which he graduated with a degree in literature from the University of Michigan. He operated an insurance agency in Ann Arbor until his late 40s, when he retired to devote the remainder of his life to documenting the history of the American circus. He began writing articles on circus history in Bandwagon, the journal of the Circus Historical Society, in the late 1960s, one a piece on Ringling cages co-authored by Richard Conover, then the leading student of American field shows.

His first major work was Mudshows and Railers, an account of the 1879 circus season based mainly on a close reading of the New York Clipper, the industry's trade paper, and metropolitan dailies. The first of his three groundbreaking books on the history of the American Circus before 1860, Annals of the American Circus, came out in 1976. It was the first extensively researched, comprehensive account of the ante-bellum American circus, obsoleting virtually all previous secondary work on the subject. He later co-authored books with fellow historians Fred Dahlinger and William L. Slout, and continued to publish in Bandwagon. Traveling Showmen, his masterpiece, was published in 1997. The distillation of his thirty years of research, the book analyzed the economic and operational aspects of pre-Civil War circuses. A companion volume on the performance and performers appeared in 2006. At the time of his death, he was finishing a biography of Adam Forepaugh, the late 19th century circus manager.

Thayer died in Seattle, Washington, on June 24, 2009. He was survived by his wife Boyka, son Preston, stepdaughter Katherine Davis, stepson Jon Davis, and grandchildren Amin, Nilofar, Aydan, and Thayer.

== Publications ==
- “One Sheet,” Bandwagon 18, no. 5 (1974): 23.
- Annals of the American Circus: 1830-1847 (1976)
- A capsule history of the Washtenaw County farm (1976) with Rhonda Barnat
- “The Keeper Will Enter the Cage: Early American Wild Animal Trainers,” Bandwagon 26, no. 6 (1982): 38.
- Annals of the American Circus: 1793-1829 (1986)
- “The Elephant in America Before 1840,” Bandwagon 31, no. 1 (1987): 20–26.
- “The Elephant in America, 1840-1860,” Bandwagon 35, no. 5 (1991): 34–37.
- Annals of the American Circus: 1848-1860 (1992)
- Grand Entree: The Birth of the Greatest Show on Earth, 1870-1875 (1997) with William L. Slout
- Traveling showmen: the American circus before the Civil War (1997)
- Badger State showmen: a history of Wisconsin's circus heritage (1998) with Fred Dahlinger
