= William L. Slout =

American historian (1923–2017)

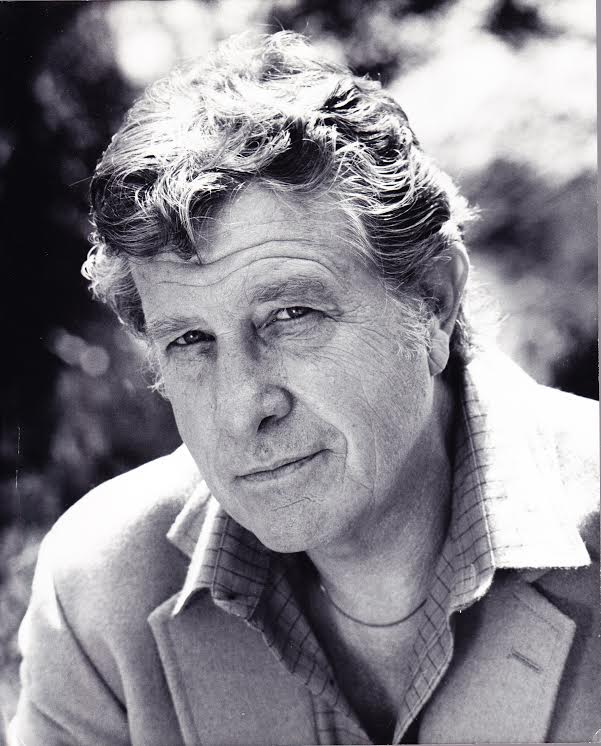
William Lawrence Slout in 1980

William Lawrence Slout (July 17, 1923 – February 4, 2017) was an American professor of theater at California State University, San Bernardino. He wrote Olympians of the Sawdust Circle and other reference books on circus history.

== Biography ==
Slout was born on July 17, 1923, in Charlotte, Michigan. He served in World War II and received a B.A. from Michigan State University in 1947 and an M.A. from Utah State University in 1953. He received a Ph.D. from the University of California, Los Angeles.

Slout died in Redlands, California, on February 4, 2017, at the age of 93.

== Publications ==
=== Author ===
- Theatre in a Tent: The Development of a Provincial Entertainment (1972) ISBN 0-87972-028-X
- Olympians of the Sawdust Circle (1998) ISBN 0-8095-0310-7

=== Editor ===
- Life upon the Wicked Stage: A Visit to the American Theatre of the 1860s, 1870s, and 1880s As Seen in the Pages of the New York Clipper (Clipper Studies in the Theatre, No. 14, 1996) ISBN 0-89370-463-6
- Old Gotham Theatricals ISBN 978-0-89370-462-9
- Popular Amusements in Horse and Buggy America ISBN 978-0-89370-461-2
- Broadway Below the Sidewalk ISBN 978-0-8095-1301-7
- The Theatrical Rambles of Mr. And Mrs. John Greene ISBN 978-0-8095-0306-3
- Clowns and Cannons ISBN 978-0-8095-1304-8
- Amphitheatres and Circuses ISBN 978-0-913960-33-2
- Ink From a Circus Press Agent ISBN 978-0-8095-1302-4
- A Royal Coupling ISBN 978-0-89370-013-3
- A Clown's Log ISBN 978-0-8095-1307-9
- Grand Entrée (with Stuart Thayer) ISBN 978-0-8095-1309-3
- Chilly Billy ISBN 978-0-89370-012-6
