= Therapeutic Lifestyle Change (depression treatment) =

Mental health treatment method

Therapeutic Lifestyle Change (TLC) is a treatment for depression which was developed by Dr. Stephen Ilardi and several graduate students at the University of Kansas. The TLC program is drug-free and relies on six lifestyle changes. The program has been found to be an effective treatment for depression, with 70-75% of patients experiencing a significant reduction in depressive symptoms.

== Background ==
The World Health Organisation has stated that depression is a leading cause of disability worldwide and a major contributor to the global burden of disease. Stephen Ilardi has described depression as a "disease of civilisation", stating "We were never designed for the sedentary, indoor, sleep-deprived, socially-isolated, fast-food-laden, frenetic pace of modern life".

Ilardi has stated that the increasing prevalence of depression is largely due to unhealthy lifestyle choices, particularly among people in developed nations. He cites research which has established that the prevalence of depression is significantly lower in parts of the world where people still live traditional lifestyles.

== TLC components ==
The TLC is composed of six lifestyle changes which include:

- Increasing consumption of omega-3 fatty acids.
- Engaging in meaningful hobbies to prevent rumination.
- Engaging in physical activity.
- Receiving sunlight exposure.
- Staying socially connected.
- Getting at least 8 hours of sleep every night.

== Efficacy ==
In his book The Depression Cure: The 6-Step Program to Beat Depression without Drugs, Ilardi cites a 2002 meta-analysis by Kirsh, which found that roughly half of depressed patients will not experience a meaningful reduction in depressive symptoms after using antidepressants. In comparison, 70-75% of patients who were treated with the TLC program noticed a significant reduction in depressive symptoms (indicated by an at least 50% reduction in symptoms).
