= TLC Camp =

Coordinates: 41°52′8″N 88°1′53″W

- Founded: 1983
- Location: Lombard, Illinois
- Region served: Northeast Illinois and surrounding states
- Website: tlccamp.org

TLC Camp is a privately held 501(c) 3 organization in Illinois, United States that provides a free one-week summer camp for children with cancer and their siblings. TLC (Togetherness in Love and Care) is held annually during the third week of June at Sunset Knoll Park in Lombard, Illinois (TLC Camp 2009). Its purpose is to provide an opportunity for these children to experience a week of fun activities that allows them a break from the rigors of treatment and worry; to enjoy life as a normal child. What separates TLC from other camps of this sort is the inclusion of siblings, who experience the stresses of living with a cancer-stricken brother or sister (Tennison 1993). Extra effort is made to not distinguish those suffering from cancer with those who are healthy. Each year around 100 children ages 5–13 attend the camp free of charge. TLC is run by the Lombard Junior Women’s Club (LJWC), who along with their families and other local volunteers staff the event. Former campers are encouraged to come back as counselors once they are too old to attend (Fellers 2004).

== History ==
TLC Camp was devised by the LJWC in 1983. The organization was in the market for a signature charitable event and one member, who was a nurse, read about a similar camp in another state and saw the potential to bring such a camp to Lombard (Hotchkin 1996). The organization liked the idea of including a sibling, which is something that no other children’s camps in the area offered. The first camp was attended by a dozen children from the Chicago area (Dassow 1995) and has since expanded to 100 campers from throughout the Midwest. TLC camp has been previously held at Four Seasons and Madison Meadows parks before moving to its present home in the late 1990s.

== Funding ==
The camp relies on tax-deductible donations to cover costs, which is around $500 per camper (TLC Camp 2009). LJWC holds a number of annual fundraisers, including a fashion show and “Bistro in the Burbs” restaurant event; the proceeds of which go to TLC. Many local individuals, businesses, and corporations donate money, goods, and services. Other women's clubs from around the Chicago area also contribute monetary donations and meals for the campers.

== Location ==
TLC is currently held at Sunset Knoll Park in Lombard, located at 820 S. Finley Road. This centralized location within the Western Suburbs of Chicago, IL allows easy access for residents of northern Illinois and surrounding states. Sunset Knoll provides 40 acres (160,000 m^{2}) that contain a picnic area, a playground, soccer and baseball fields, a recreation center, and plenty of open space for the camp’s various activities (Lombard Park District 2009).

== Activities ==
Activities during the week of TLC include arts and crafts, sports, games, and outings to various venues in the area. In the past these have included trips to Brookfield Zoo, bowling alleys, arcades, professional sporting events, and water parks to name a few (Rosen 2009). Each year a different theme ties the week together; past themes include the Wild West, Hollywood, African Safari, Americana, Mardi gras, and the 1960s.

== Staffing ==
The camp is mainly staffed by members of the Lombard Junior Women’s Club and their families. Other volunteers include former campers, members of other women’s clubs, and local high school and college students. All staff members go through an orientation process that includes training from medical professionals. In addition to this training, registered nurses are on hand at all times and the Lombard Police and Fire Departments are alerted as to when the camp is occurring (TLC Camp 2009).

== Recognition ==
In the past, the week of TLC Camp has been declared “TLC Camp Week” by both the mayor of Lombard and the governor of Illinois (Skweres 1997).
