= Lisec, Trebnje =

Lisec
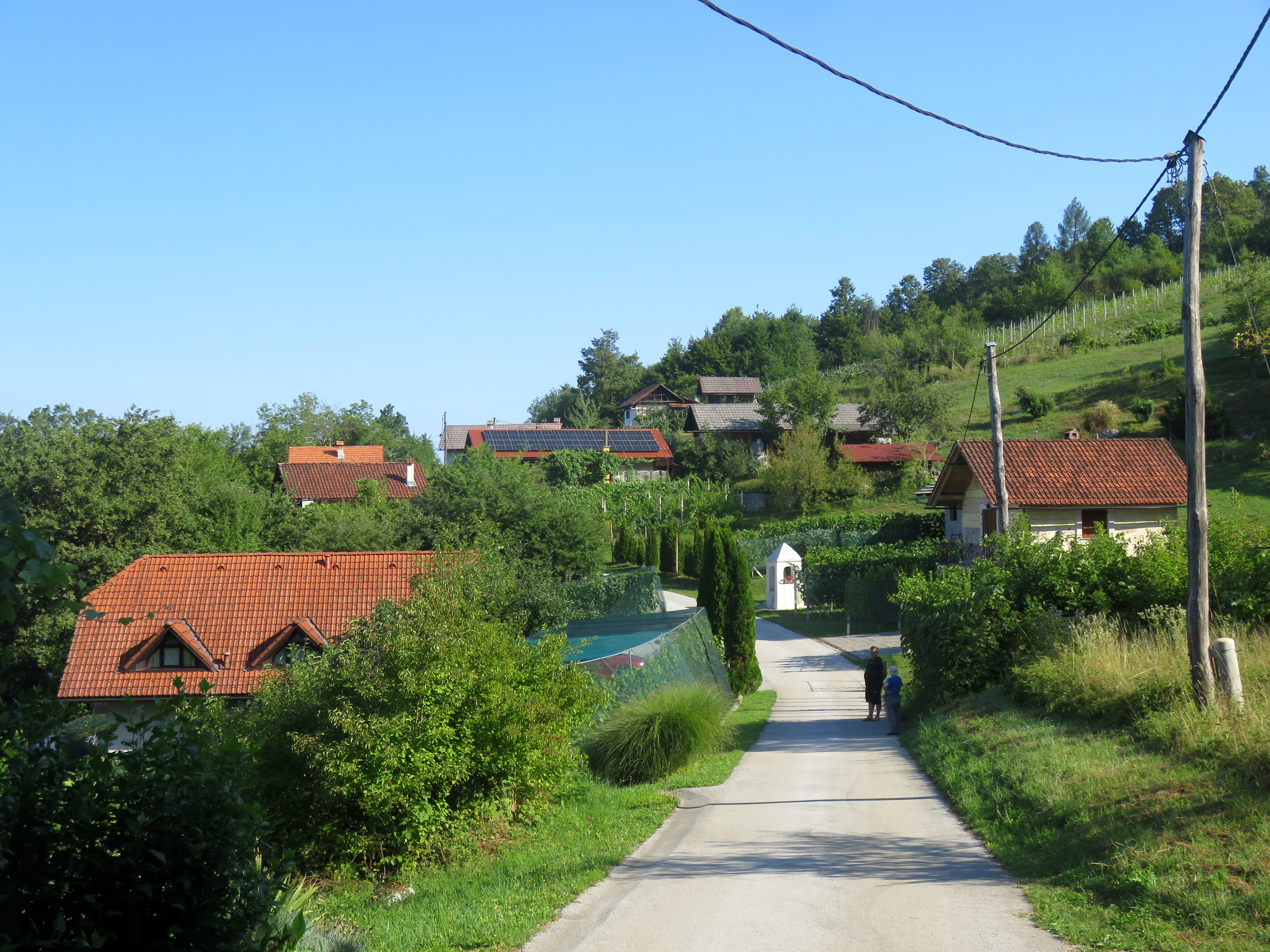

- Location in Slovenia
- Coordinates: 45°51′51.15″N 14°56′57.75″E
- Country: Slovenia
- Traditional region: Lower Carniola
- Statistical region: Southeast Slovenia
- Municipality: Trebnje

Area
  - Total: 1.82 km^{2} (0.70 sq mi)
- Elevation: 360.8 m (1,184 ft)

Population (2002)
  - Total: 12

Lisec (pronounced [ˈliːsəts]) is a settlement in the Municipality of Trebnje in eastern Slovenia. It is a settlement of dispersed houses among the vineyards on the western slopes of Lisec Hill west of Dobrnič. The area is part of the historical region of Lower Carniola. The municipality is now included in the Southeast Slovenia Statistical Region.

A small open chapel-shrine in the northern part of the settlement dates to the second half of the 19th century.
