= George Thayer (football player) =

American football player (1905–1952)

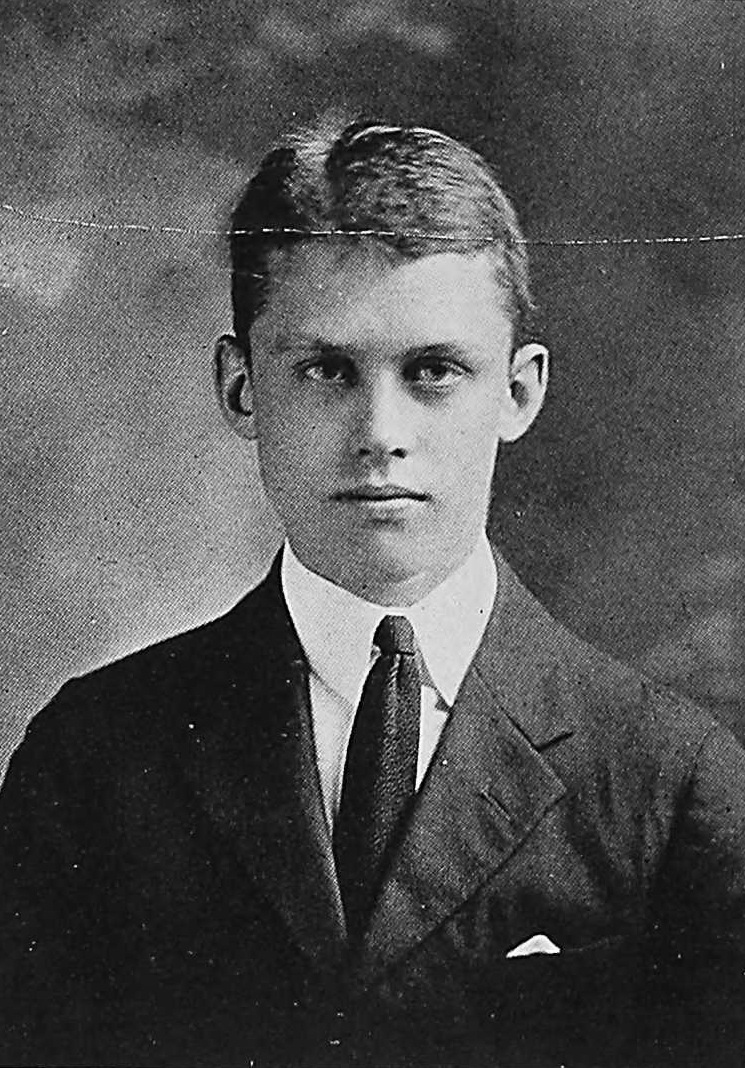
- 1923 yearbook photo of Thayer

Profile
- Position: End

Personal information
- Born: March 5, 1905; Philadelphia, Pennsylvania
- Died: April 21, 1952 (age 47)

Career information
- College: University of Pennsylvania

Career history
- 1924–1925: Penn

Awards and highlights
- First-team All-American (1925)

George Chapman Thayer Jr. (March 5, 1905 – April 21, 1952) was an American football player. He grew up in Villanova, Pennsylvania, and attended the University of Pennsylvania. While at Penn, he was a member of Delta Psi. He also played college football at the end position for the Penn Quakers football team in 1924 and 1925. In December 1925, he was voted by his teammates as the captain of the 1926 Penn football team. At the end of the 1926 season, he was selected by Grantland Rice as a first-team end on his 1925 College Football All-America Team for Collier's Weekly. He was also named a second-team All-American by the Associated Press. He declined offers to play professional football, and in 1927, he traveled to Honduras for a two-year to learn the business of growing and exporting fruit. He died in 1952 at age 47, just 6 months after being named a partner at Merrill Lynch. He was buried at the Church of the Redeemer cemetery in Bryn Mawr, Pennsylvania.

He was the father of the political writer George Thayer.
