= George Thayer (writer) =

American political writer (1933–1973)

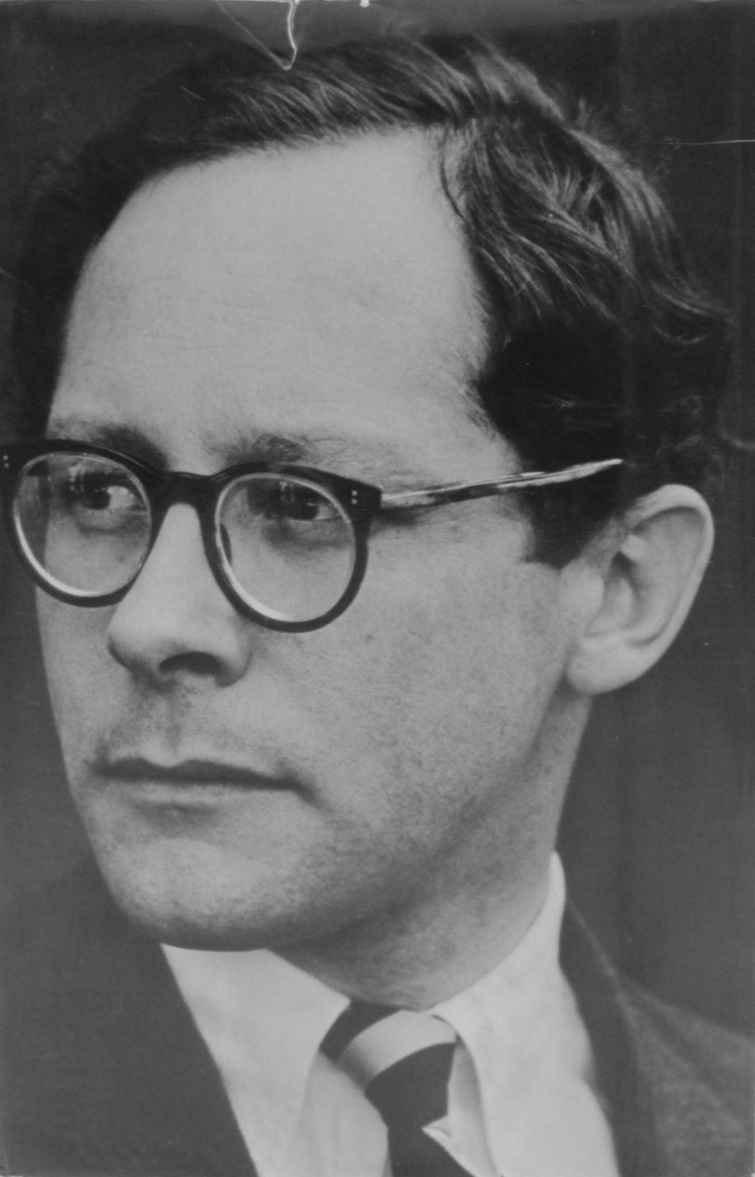
- Thayer c. 1967
- Born: George Chapman Thayer Jr. September 18, 1933; Philadelphia, Pennsylvania, U.S.
- Died: August 13, 1973 (aged 39); Washington, D.C., U.S.
- Education: University of Pennsylvania, University of Geneva
- Occupations: Author, political scientist, journalist
- Years active: 1965–1973
- Notable work: The Farther Shores of Politics, The War Business
- Spouse: Carol Edgerton (m. 1972)
- Father: George Thayer

George Chapman Thayer Jr. (September 18, 1933 – August 13, 1973) was an American political writer, journalist, and speechwriter. Thayer was a speechwriter for several American political figures, including Nelson Rockefeller and Lawrence Coughlin, and wrote articles for The Washington Post and Harper's Magazine, among other publications.

Thayer wrote four books in his lifetime, which all focused on economic and political topics. His first book, The British Political Fringe, was published in 1965. He followed this up with The Farther Shores of Politics, which focuses on the extremes of politics in 1960s America, and The War Business, which focuses on the United States's role in the international arms industry. Thayer died of cancer in 1973, with his fourth book, Who Shakes the Money Tree?, published posthumously.

== Early life and education ==
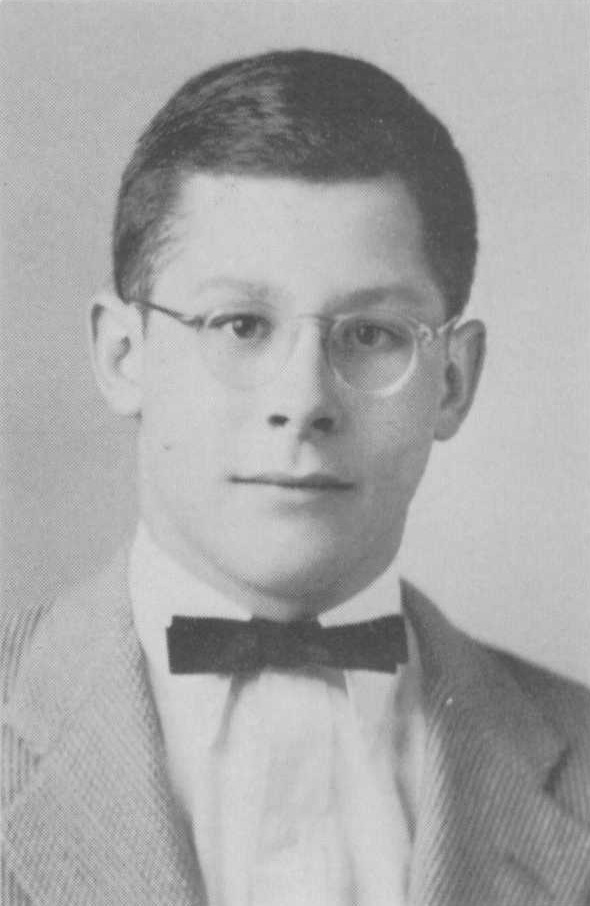
Thayer's 1951 yearbook photo

George Chapman Thayer Jr. was born on September 18, 1933, in Philadelphia, Pennsylvania. His parents were George Thayer and Mary H. Steel. His father George Thayer was a businessman with Merrill Lynch and former professional football player at the University of Pennsylvania. Thayer had five siblings, four sisters and one brother.

Thayer attended high school at St. Paul's School in Concord, New Hampshire. He graduated in 1951. He served in the U.S. Army where he specialized as a cryptologist. He went on to the University of Pennsylvania, from which he graduated in 1955 with a Bachelor of Arts degree in English literature. He studied further at the University of Geneva. He graduated from the University of Geneva in 1958 with a degree in International Business Administration. From 1963 to 1964, Thayer studied in residence at the London School of Economics and Political Science.

== Career ==
Thayer was a political scientist and primarily wrote on political and economic topics. He wrote for several publications, including articles and book reviews. The publications he wrote for included The Washington Post, The Observer, Washington Monthly, and Harper's Magazine.

In 1965, he was a research assistant to the British writer Randolph Churchill while Churchill worked on his biography of his father, Winston Churchill. He moved back to the United States and lived in Washington, D.C., from the mid-1960s. He was also employed as a speechwriter. Thayer wrote speeches for several American politicians, including Nelson Rockefeller in 1968 and Claiborne Pell in 1969. He was an assistant and speechwriter for representative Lawrence Coughlin from 1969 to 1972.

== Works ==
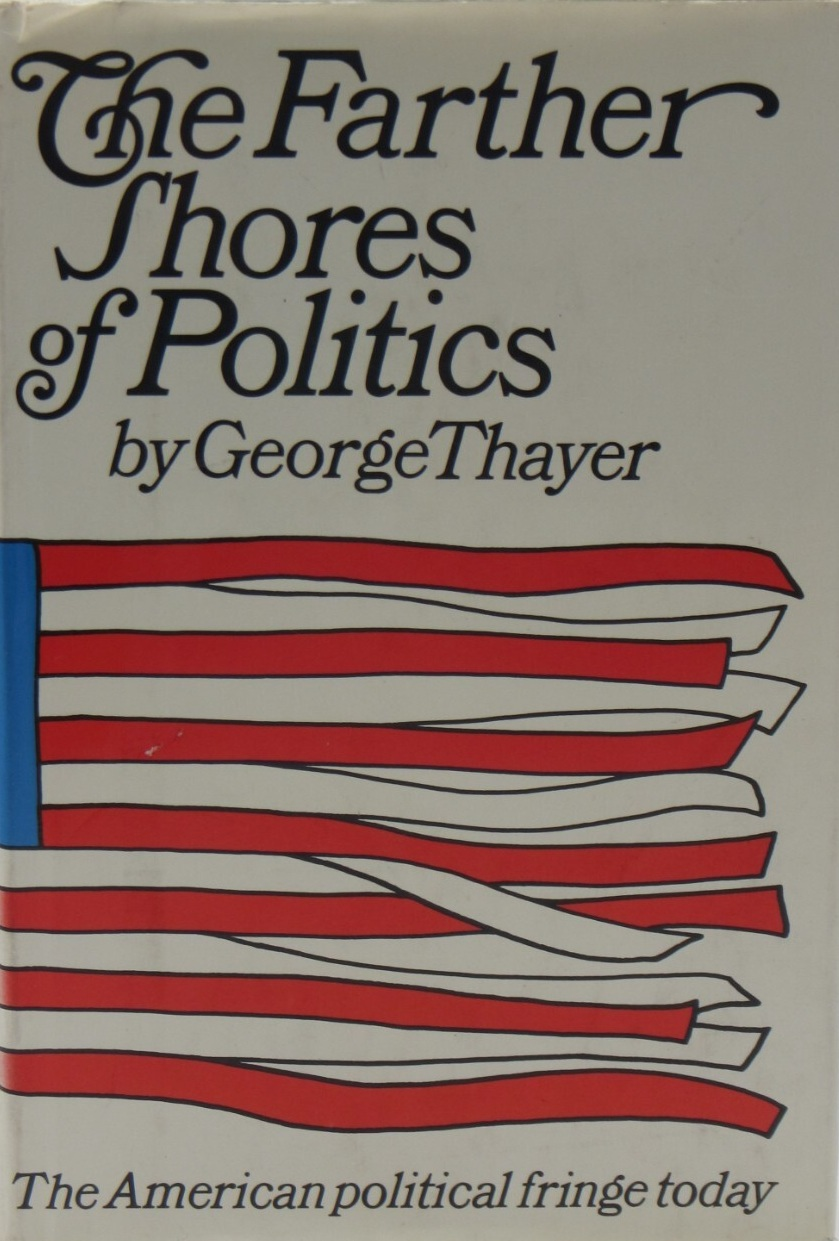
Cover of the first hardcover edition of Thayer's book The Farther Shores of Politics

Thayer's first book, The British Political Fringe: A Profile, was published in 1965 by Anthony Blond. focusing on British political extremism, focusing on 12 major fringe movements, including fascists, socialists, nationalists, and Irish Republicans.

In 1969, his second book, The Farther Shores of Politics: The American Political Fringe Today, was published by Simon & Schuster. The book is 610 pages long, and focuses on American political extremism. To research the book he interviewed over 400 people and traveled over 16,000 miles to research. While writing the book, several of the people he was writing about threatened to harm him, both far-left and far-right, though most were friendly to him. He interviewed several notable political figures, including the neo-Nazi George Lincoln Rockwell and perennial candidate Henry B. Krajewski. Thayer argues that political extremists, despite often being referred to as the "lunatic fringe", are largely not insane. It was published in the UK the next year by Allen Lane The Penguin Press.

His third book, The War Business: The International Trade in Armaments, was published in 1969 by Simon & Schuster in a 417-page edition. He became interested in the subject matter following an assignment for CBS. The book took him roughly three years to write. In the book, Thayer argued in the book that the United States served as the world's "largest arms dealer" and provides the weapons for conflicts globally, arming rebels and foreign governments. The War Business was translated into several languages.

Thayer's fourth and final book, published posthumously in November 1973, was Who Shakes the Money Tree? American Campaign Financing Practices from 1789 to the Present. It covers the political history of political funding in America and the influence of advocacy group funding on politics.

== Personal life and death ==
In July 1972, Thayer became engaged to Carol Lytle Edgerton. On September 9, 1972, they married in an Episcopal ceremony in Washington, D.C.

Thayer died on August 13, 1973, in Washington, D.C. at Georgetown University Hospital, from cancer. He was 39. He had previously undergone two surgeries related to cancer. He was buried in the Church of the Redeemer Cemetery in Philadelphia.

== Bibliography ==
- —— (1965). The British Political Fringe: A Profile. London: Anthony Blond.
- —— (1967). The Farther Shores of Politics: The American Political Fringe Today. New York: Simon & Schuster.
- —— (1969). The War Business: The International Trade in Armaments. New York: Simon & Schuster.
- —— (1973). Who Shakes the Money Tree? American Campaign Financing Practices from 1789 to the Present. New York: Simon & Schuster. ISBN 0-671-21601-5.
