= William Thayer =

William Thayer may refer to:

- William Greenough Thayer (1863–1934), American educator
- W. Paul Thayer (1919–2010), American test pilot, aviation executive, and Deputy Secretary of Defense during the Reagan Administration
- William Roscoe Thayer (1859–1923), American author and editor
- William Sydney Thayer (consul) (died 1864), American Consul General to Egypt (1861–1864) - see United States Ambassador to Egypt
- William Sydney Thayer (1864–1932), American physician and professor of medicine
- W. W. Thayer (William Wallace Thayer, 1827–1899), American politician, governor of Oregon, and Oregon Supreme Court chief justice
- William Wilde Thayer, one of the founders of the short-lived Thayer & Eldridge publishing firm (c. 1860–1861)
- William Thayer Arteaga (1918–2018), Chilean politician
