= Lisette Burrows =

New Zealand physical education academic

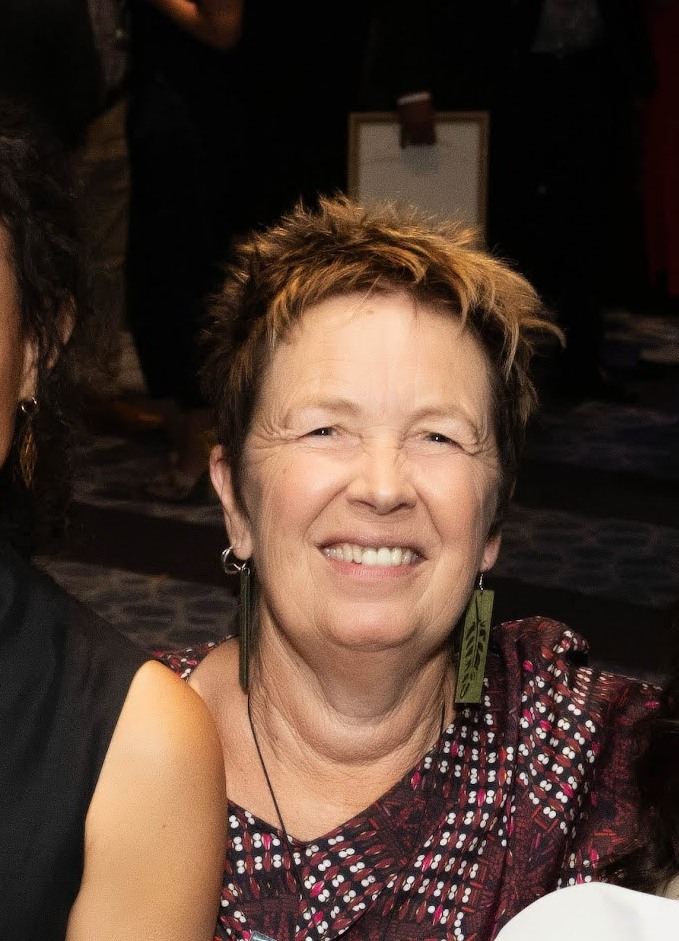
- Burrows in 2025
- Other name: Lisette C. Burrows
- Education: University of Wollongong
- Scientific career
- Fields: Physical education
- Workplaces: University of Otago, University of Waikato
- Thesis: Developmental discourses in school physical education (1999)

Lisette C. Burrows is a New Zealand physical education academic. She is currently a full professor at the University of Waikato, where she holds the role as the director of the Te Ngira Institute for Population Research.

== Academic career ==
After a 1999 PhD from the University of Wollongong titled 'Developmental discourses in school physical education,' Burrows worked at the University of Otago from 1991, rising to full professor in 2015 before moving to the University of Waikato in 2017.

In 2014, Burrows received Physical Education New Zealand's (PENZ) Sir Alexander Gillies Medal.

As part of her appointment at the University of Waikato, Burrows is also the Director of the Te Ngira Institute for Population Research, and is the co-editor of the journal "Sport, Education, and Society".

== Selected works ==
- Wright, Jan, Lisette Burrows, and Doune MacDonald, eds. Critical inquiry and problem-solving in physical education. Psychology Press, 2004.
- Burrows, Lisette, and Jan Wright. "Prescribing practices: Shaping healthy children in schools." The International Journal of Children's Rights 15, no. 1 (2007): 83–98.
- Wright, Jan, and Lisette Burrows. "Re-conceiving ability in physical education: a social analysis." Sport, Education and Society 11, no. 3 (2006): 275–291.
- Burrows, Lisette, Jan Wright, and Justine Jungersen-Smith. "“Measure Your Belly.” New Zealand Children's Constructions of Health and Fitness." Journal of Teaching in Physical Education 22, no. 1 (2002): 39–48.
- Wright, Jan, and Lisette Burrows. "“Being healthy”: the discursive construction of health in New Zealand children's responses to the National Education Monitoring Project." Discourse: studies in the cultural politics of education 25, no. 2 (2004): 211–230.
- WRIGHT, JAN, and LISETTE BURROWS. "The discursive production of childhood, identity and health." In Body knowledge and control, pp. 107–119. Routledge, 2004.
