= Lissette Solorzano =

Cuban photographer

Lissette Solórzano
- Born: 1969 (age 56–57); Santiago de Cuba
- Education: San Alejandro School of Fine Art; Havana’s School of Photography; Havana’s School of Design
- Occupation: photographer

Lissette Solórzano is a professional photographer born in Santiago de Cuba in 1969. She has worked as a medical photographer, photojournalist, photo curator and graphic designer. She has won many prizes – such as the “Photographic Essay Prize” of the Casa de las Américas - and her work has been exhibited in museums and galleries throughout Cuba as well as in Mexico, in England and in the United States. She is also a member of the Cuban Writers and Artists Union (UNEAC).

== Education ==
Lissette Solórzano attended the San Alejandro School of Fine Art in 1986. She entered the Havana's School of Photography in 1991, and took courses at the Havana's School of Design two years later, in 1993.

== Style ==
Solórzano specializes in black and white photographs taken in the street, in her native island, Cuba.

== Work ==
In 1992, she began showing her personal work in an exhibition called Fantasmas efímeros y otras imagines (Ephemeral Ghosts and other images) at the Fototeca of Cuba. Thanks to this exhibition, she won the “Photographic Essay Prize” of the Casa de las Américas in 1994. She also won this prize in 1998 with her Homeless series, for which she had spent two months in New York.

Solórzano often uses some effects to present her work in its livelier environment. For her El Ferrocarril exhibition in 2002, galleries were outfitted with train tracks and resonated with music and sound effects.

She travels across the world, and her work is exhibited in Cuba, Mexico, Venezuela, Spain and the United States. She also participates in the Havana Biennial, as in many collective exhibitions.

Solorzano also did a collaborative project with another Cuban photographer, Jose Marti, and James Quine and Theresa Segal of St. Augustine. The project they worked on together was a documentary, entitled ""Shared Vision: Vision Compartida/Photographs of Baracoa, Cuba: A Collaborative Documentary" which documented Cuba through the eyes of the four photographers. Within this collaboration, Solorzano's contribution was uniquely stylistic, having an emphasis on linear, diagonal elements.

== Awards ==
• 2002 - UNEAC prize, V Bienal of Photography, San Antonio de los Baños.

• 1999 - “II Salón Combinatorio Arte-Cuerpo”, Galería de Arte Her-Car, Arroyo Naranjo, Prize given to the best performance based on the artistic work of Lissette Solorzano.

• 1998 - Photographic Essay Prize, Selected Salon, Casa de las Américas Prize.

• 1996 - Photographic Essay Prize, Selected Salon, Casa de las Américas Prize.

• 1995 - “Tina Modotti” Prize, given by the Cuban press.

• 1994 - Photographic Essay Prize, Selected Salon, Casa de las Américas Prize.

== Collections ==
- Casa de las Américas, La Habana, Cuba. - Fototeca de Cuba, Cuba. - Harvard University, Boston, E.U. - Latin American Studies Centre, NY. E.U. - The Gallery, Milan, Italy. - Collection-Palmquist Women photography. - Benham Gallery, Seattle, Washington, E.U.

== Publications ==
- Magazine of Harvard University DRCLAS. - The Millennium Capsule Book and the Book Collection at the Millennium Photo Project. - Topo magazine (art magazine from Quebec). - Cuban publications and specialized magazines. - “Vórtice” magazine from Yucatan. - Luna Cornea (Centre for the Photographic Image). - Photographic book : The photo of my mother.

== Personal exhibitions ==
• 2005 - The City of Columns, Université d´Architecture La Villette, Paris.

• 2004 - Mes de la Fotografía en Gwanza, Harare, Zimbabwe.

• 2004 - The City of Columns (1st Part), Photographs, Fototeca de Cuba.

• 2003 - Ferro-Carril, Benham Gallery, Seattle, Washington, United States.

• 2003 - Ferro-Carril, National Gallery of Zimbabwe, Zimbabwe.

• 2002 - Ferro-Carril, Fototeca de Cuba, Havana, Cuba.

• 2002 - Latin Atmospheres, The Gallery, Milan, Italy.

• 2002 - Margins, Kultstein Gallery, Austria.

• 2001 - Four visions of Cuba, Blue Circle Gallery, Chicago, United States.

• 2000 - Patina del Tiempo, Spanish Cultural Centre, Havana, Cuba.

• 2000 - Qué somos ? Provincial Centre for the Plastic Arts and Design. Luz y Oficios, Old Havana, Cuba.

• 1999 - Un solo de camara, Her-Car Gallery, Arroyo Naranjo, Havana, Cuba.

• 1998 - Homeless, Casa de la Cultura Plaza, Havana, Cuba.

• 1997 - Contemporary Cuban Photography, Museum of the Americas, Denver, United States.

• 1997 - Lissette Solórzano's photos, Ohio University, United States.

• 1997 - Contemporary Cuban Photography, Casa de las Américas of New York, United States.

• 1994 - Photographic work of Lissette Solórzano, Espacio Abierto Gallery, Havana, Cuba.

• 1994 - Two photographic essays, Arawak Centre, Curazao, Antillas Holandesas.

• 1994 - Photos of the Cuban Lissette Solórzano, Galería Viva, New York, United States.

• 1994 - The image of theatre(The Theatrical Image), Fine Arts Museum, Maracaibo, Venezuela.

• 1992 - Fantasmas efímeros y otras imágenes (Ephemeral Ghosts and other images), Fototeca of Cuba, Havana, Cuba.

== Collective exhibitions ==
• 2013 - Reality of Placement, Union College, Schenectady, NY

• 2006 - Lo real...es maravilloso, Exposición Collateral 9na Bienal de la Habana, Taller de Serigrafía René Portocarrero, Havana, Cuba.

• 2005 - Panorama of Cuban Photography by Cuban Photographers, The Photographers Gallery, Kuala Lumpur, Malaysia.

• 2005 - La Imagen, Fototeca de Cuba, Habana Vieja, Cuba.

• 2005 - Visión Compartida, Galería del Hostal Conde de Villanueva, Habana Vieja, Cuba.

• 2005 - Visión Compartida, Galería de arte Eliseo Reyes, Baracoa, Cuba.

• 2004 - La Habana, lo bello, Museo Simon Bolivar, La Habana, Cuba.

• 2004 - The Mysteries of “Santeria”, Paterson Museum, New Jersey.

• 2004 - Mes de la Fotografía en Gwanza, Harare, Zimbabwe.

• 2003 - The History of Cuba through photographic images, National Museum, Malasya.

• 2003 - Cuban Photography, Benham Gallery, Seattle, Washington, United States.

• 2003 - Interior space, Fototeca de Cuba, VIII Bienal de la Habana, Cuba.

• 2003 - Cuba-Canada one hundred years view”, Fototeca de Cuba, Havana, Cuba.

• 2003 - Havana Images, Development Centre for Visual Arts, Havana, Cuba.

• 2002 - Women, Gallery of the Alianza Francesa de Cuba, Havana, Cuba.

• 2002 - Havana in my heart, Proud Galleries, London.

• 2001 - One Photograph, Two Photographs, Hall of Contemporary Cuban Photography, Fototeca de Cuba.

• 2001 - Exhibition at “La Llorona Gallery” in Chicago, United States.

• 2001 - Dawn of the 21st Century, O’Hare International Airport, Chicago, United States.

• 2001 - Cuban Photography, Contemporary Art Festival, Seattle, United States.

• 2001 - Salon Nacional de Fotografía Contemporanea, Havana, Cuba.

• 2001 - A Winter in Havana, Morro-Cabaña Complex, Havana, Cuba.

• 2000 - 4th IIPC, (Internet International Photo Contest) : the photo Coincidences.

• 2000 - The Cuban Photo in the Fifties up to the present. Photographic Museum in Israel.

• 1999 - II Salón Combinatorio “Arte-Cuerpo, Galería de Arte HER-CAR”, Arroyo Naranjo, Havana.

• 1999 - 3rd IIPC (Internet International Photo Contest) : the photo My dreams.

• 1997 - Fotonoviembre, hosted by the Caguayo Foundation, Santiago de Cuba, Cuba.

• 1995 - Exhibition at the Latin-American Studies Centre "Rómulo Gallegos", Caracas, Venezuela.

• 1995 - Exhibition in Pachuca, Hidalgo, Mexico.

• 1995 - Exhibition in Techo Peón Contreras, Mérida, Yucatan, Mexico.

• 1994 - The photo of my mother, Edimbourg, London.

• 1992 - Salón de la Ciudad, Havana, Cuba.

• 1992 - Minifoto (1,2 y 3), Journalists Union of Cuba, Havana, Cuba.

• 1992 - Expo-Salón, Journalists Union of Cuba, Havana, Cuba.

• 1992 - Por el camino, Universal Art Gallery, Cienfuegos, Cuba.

• 1992 - Made in Cuba, House of Culture Flora, Havana, Cuba.

• 1992 - America & Americhe, Casina Grande, Milan, Italy.

• 1992 - Per Cuba, Ciudad Matera, Italy.

• 1992 - Imagen, Wifredo Lam Gallery, Havana, Cuba.
