= Lizzie E. D. Thayer =

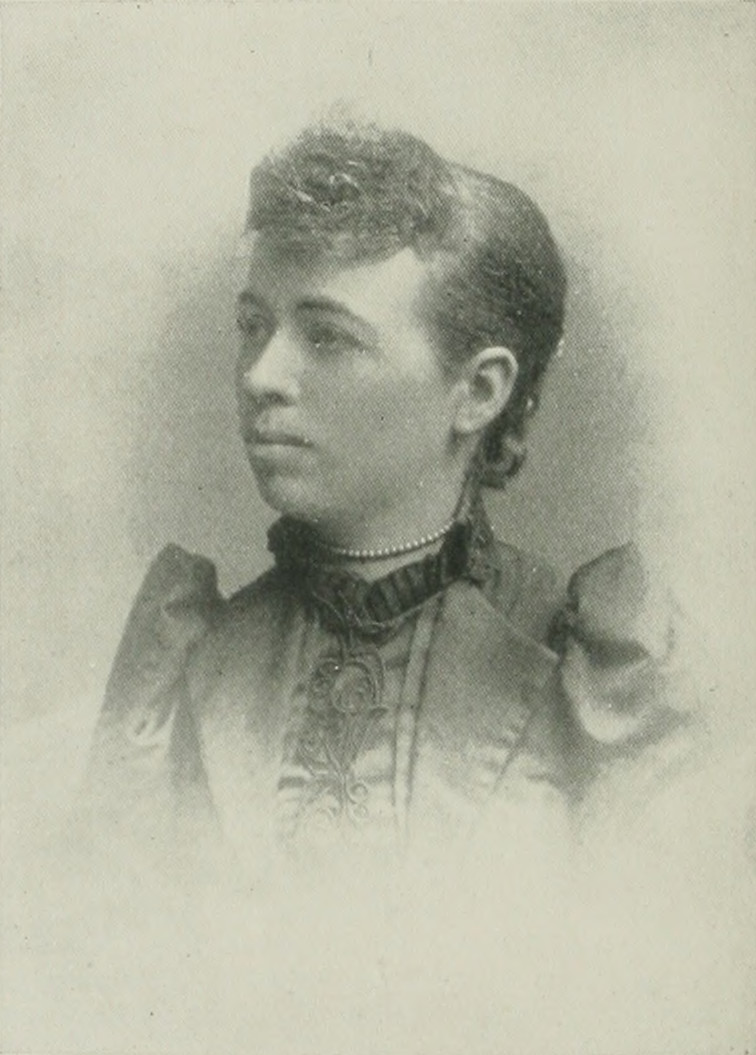
- Lizzie E. D. Thayer, A Woman of the Century
- Born: 5 October 1857; Ware, Massachusetts
- Died: 6 December 1923 (aged 66); Glencliff, New Hampshire
- Other names: Lizzie Sprague

Lizzie Sprague (née Lizzie E. D. Thayer; 5 October 1857 – 6 December 1923) was train dispatcher and telegraph operator. In 1889 she entered the service of the New London Northern Railroad, and on the resignation of the train dispatcher, whose assistant she had been for a year, she was appointed to the office. She was the first woman to hold the position of train-dispatcher.

== Biography ==
Lizzie E. D. Thayer was born in Ware, Massachusetts on the 5 October 1857. She was the granddaughter, on her mother's side, of Selina Simpson of Castle Craig and Ariel de la Roque, a captain in the French navy. On her father's side, she was related to the President of France, Adolphe Thiers, and to the Revolutionary general, Nathanael Greene.

Her family moved to New London, Connecticut in 1871 and she graduated the young ladies' high school in New London. Since 1878, she was employed as a telegraph operator and was employed in various New England telegraph offices of the Western Union Telegraph Company and one year in an office of the New York and New England Railroad. In 1889 she entered the service of the New London Northern Railroad, which at the time, was primely a large freight business, connecting, among others, the Soo lines, the Canadian Pacific, and the Canadian Atlantic and the Erie Dispatch. It was not intended that she should become the train-dispatcher of the railroad but she had been the train-dispatcher's assistant for nearly a year, and when he resigned, there was no one else to take his place.

Thayer was put in charge temporarily until the officials of the railroad could find a man who had the necessary qualifications. However after a few months, with their search turning up nothing and Thayer's work being deemed satisfactory, she was made the official train-dispatcher. For the first seven months she held the place without assistance of any kind, and was on duty daily from 7 a.m. until 9 p.m. Later, she gained an assistant, making her work lighter. She was the first woman in the world to hold the position of train-dispatcher.

She would marry John Sprague in 1897, with the pair going on to have a total of ten children. She died on the 6 December 1923, at the age of 66, and was buried in Glencliff, New Hampshire.
