= Thayer Learning Center =

Boot camp for teenagers in Missouri, US

Coordinates: 39°47′6″N 94°5′42″W

The Thayer Learning Center or TLC was a military based, Christian boarding school boot camp for troubled teens in Kidder, Missouri from 2002 to 2009. The program enrolled over 100 students and costs run up to $4,000 a month. The program stated that it "... changes, reunites, and restores hope to families across the nation." There has been some controversy in past years. The center is one of many facilities for troubled teens listed on the watch list on the International Survivors Action Committee (ISAC).

The facility closed in September 2009. In October 2009, it was announced that John and Willa Bundy, of St. George, Utah had sold the grounds to Lakota John (also of St. George) for the White Buffalo Academy, which is to focus on Native American education.

The campus was formerly Thayer College and a public school. Thayer College was founded in 1871 and closed in 1876. It reopened in 1877 as the Kidder Institute and operated under the auspices of the Congregational Church of Missouri. The building was used as a public school from 1934 to 1981.

== Program information ==
The TLC offered a year-long program, and summer programs of four, eight, and twelve weeks in the summer for teenagers from the ages of thirteen to seventeen. A typical student, as described on Thayer Learning Center's website, is:

- Acting defiant, disrespectful, and disobedient to authority figures at home and/or in school
- Doing poorly, refusing to attend, or failing in school
- Experimenting with drugs, alcohol, sex, and other risky behaviors
- Having some minor legal troubles, shoplifting, taking the family car, etc.
- Struggling with or showing signs of ADD/ADHD or ODD

== Academics ==
Of the two phases of the TLC, only the second permits a student to participate in schooling. This is because TLC wants children to view education as a privilege. Thayer Learning Center employs several certified teachers and the children also have access to tutors. The self-directed study is done through Penn Foster High School, an accredited distance-learning program.

== Motto ==
From TLC's website:

It is mastery of these simple things in life that brings true success in life:

- Spiritual Identity
- Physical Fitness
- Good Nutrition
- Time Management
- Financial Management
- Goal Setting
- Service to others

== Controversy ==
On November 3, 2004, an event took place which has sparked investigations and allegations of abuse concerning TLC's treatment of cadets. Roberto Reyes, of Santa Rosa, California, had been at Thayer Learning Center for less than a week when he died after being bitten by a spider, according to his autopsy. The Caldwell County, Missouri coroner said at the time that the autopsy concluded that the death was an accident and said Reyes could have been bitten before he arrived at the camp.

The Government Accountability Office (GAO), the investigative arm of Congress, studied the Reyes death, in late 2007, for a report released to the House of Representatives. The GAO report said Reyes had more than 30 cuts and bruises on his body when he died. The staff had interpreted Reyes’ symptoms – including falling down frequently, complaining of muscle soreness, vomiting and involuntarily urinating and defecating on himself – as rebellion.

After complaining of illness, Reyes was forced to the ground and held there on several occasions, according to the report. On one occasion, he had a 20-pound sandbag tied around his neck when he was too sick to exercise.

Reyes was placed in the “sick bay” the morning of the day he died, where a staff member checked on him mid-afternoon and found he had no pulse. The staff then called 911 and Reyes was taken to the hospital, where he was pronounced dead.

A state investigation found that Reyes might have survived if he had earlier medical attention, and that records at the camp may have been falsified. No criminal charges were ever filed, though Reyes’ parents filed a wrongful death suit that was settled out of court for about US$1 million, according to the GAO.

In late October 2007, Representative George Miller, D-Calif., announced the GAO had referred the case to the Federal Bureau of Investigation, stating, "In light of the seriousness of this case, in which neglect, if not outright abuse, likely contributed to the death of a child, I urge the Federal Bureau of Investigation to treat this referral with urgency."

Despite the allegations, as of 2009, the Thayer Learning Center had never been charged nor found to have committed any wrongdoing.
