= Justice Thayer =

Justice Thayer may refer to:

- Andrew J. Thayer (1818–1873), associate justice of the Oregon Supreme Court
- John M. Thayer (judge) (1847–1923), associate justice of the Connecticut Supreme Court
- W. Stephen Thayer III (born 1946), associate justice of the New Hampshire Supreme Court
- W. W. Thayer (1827–1899), chief justice of the Oregon Supreme Court

== See also ==
- Judge Thayer (disambiguation)
