= Lisette Diaz =

American beauty pageant titleholder and actress, model

- Born: 1983 (age 42–43)
- Occupations: actress, model and beauty pageant

Lissette Diaz (born 1983) is an American actress, model and beauty pageant titleholder who represented the United States at Miss World 2005. She was the third Hispanic contestant to be crowned. Lissette also graduated from Barbizon Modeling and Acting School in San Francisco.

Preceded by Nancy Randall	Miss World America; 2005	Succeeded by Brooke Angus
