= Miss USA 1965 =

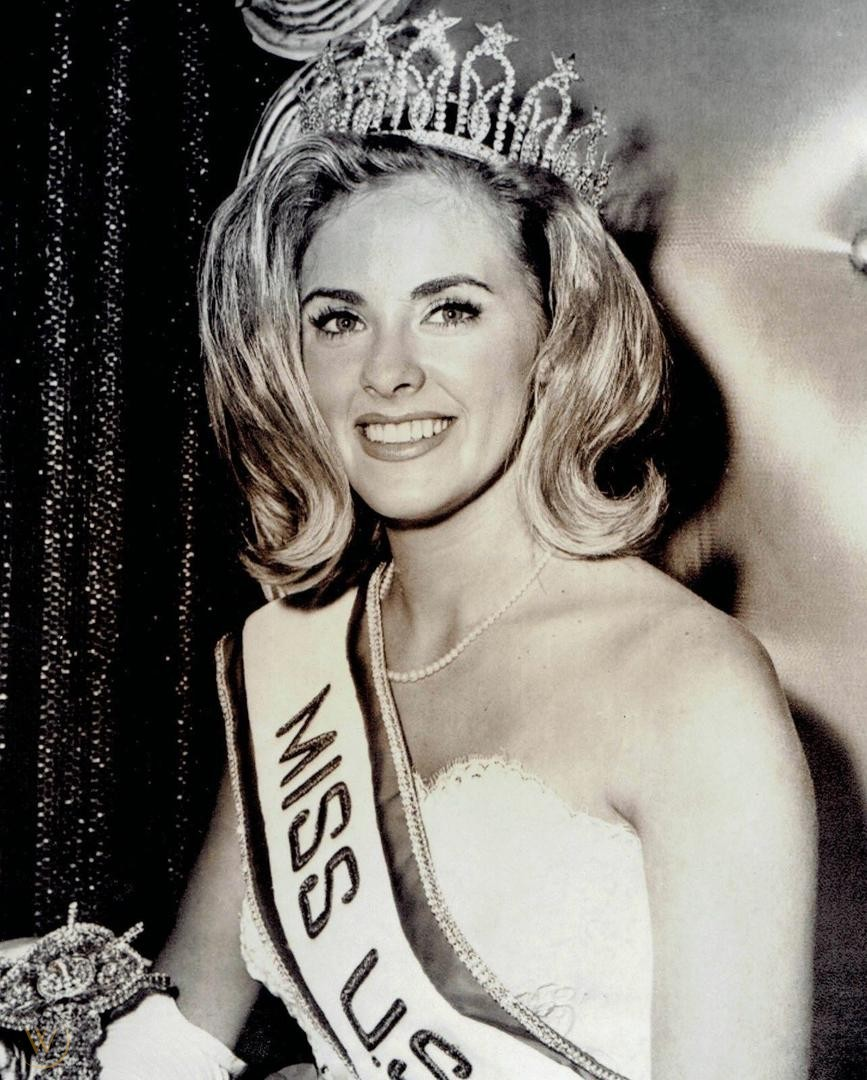
- Sue Ann Downey after winning Miss USA 1965
- Date: June 4, 1965
- Venue: Miami Beach, Florida
- Broadcaster: CBS, WTVJ
- Entrants: 47
- Placements: 15
- Winner: Sue Downey; Ohio

Miss USA 1965 was the 14th Miss USA pageant, held in Miami Beach, Florida on June 4, 1965. This was the first Miss USA pageant to be televised live (on the CBS network), and the first to be a self-contained production, held several weeks before, and independent of, the Miss Universe pageant.

The pageant was won by Sue Downey of Ohio. Downey's sponsor said he had received over 100 telephone calls warning that she had no chance to win, because she looked too much like the outgoing titleholder, Bobbi Johnson of the District of Columbia; but this only made them more determined. To add to the tension, Downey fell and injured her leg during rehearsals the day before the contest, received x-rays, and recovered after ice and bed rest.

Downey went on to place as 2nd runner-up to Apasra Hongsakula of Thailand at Miss Universe 1965. Pageant finalist Dianna Lynn Batts (later known as Dian Parkinson when she was a Barker's Beauty on The Price Is Right) later won the 1965 Miss World USA title, and placed 1st runner-up to Lesley Langley of the United Kingdom at Miss World 1965.

== Results ==
Final results	Contestant
Miss USA 1965	Ohio – Sue Downey
1st Runner-Up	Arizona – Jane Nelson
2nd Runner-Up	New Mexico – Judith "Judy" Baldwin
3rd Runner-Up	Kentucky – Julie Andrus
4th Runner-Up	(Washington, D.C.) District of Columbia - Dianna Lynn Batts
Top 15	Alabama – Leigh Sanford; California – Kathryn Hage; Hawaii – Elithe Aguiar; Michigan – Susan Pill; Nevada – Denyse Turner; (New York (state)) New York – Gloria Jon; Oklahoma – Cheryl Semrad; South Carolina – Vicki Harrison; Texas – Phyllis Johnson; Utah – Janice Sadler
