= The Burning (1981 film) =

1981 slasher film by Tony Maylam

- Theatrical release poster
- Directed by: Tony Maylam
- Screenplay by: Bob Weinstein; Peter Lawrence
- Story by: Brad Grey; Tony Maylam; Harvey Weinstein
- Produced by: Harvey Weinstein
- Starring: Brian Matthews; Leah Ayres; Brian Backer; Jason Alexander; Larry Joshua; Lou David
- Cinematography: Harvey Harrison
- Edited by: Jack Sholder
- Music by: Rick Wakeman
- Production companies: Cropsy Venture; Miramax Films
- Distributed by: Filmways Pictures (United States); Ambassador Film Distributors (Canada); J&M Entertainment (International)
- Release date: May 8, 1981
- Running time: 91 minutes
- Countries: United States; Canada
- Language: English
- Budget: $1.5 million
- Box office: $707,770 (United States/Canada)

The Burning (aka Carnage) is a 1981 Canadian-American slasher film directed by Tony Maylam, and starring Brian Matthews, Leah Ayres, Brian Backer, Larry Joshua, and Lou David. Its plot follows a summer camp caretaker who is horribly burnt from a prank gone wrong, where he seeks vengeance at a nearby summer camp years later. The film marks the debuts of actors Jason Alexander, Fisher Stevens, and Holly Hunter. The film is an international co-production between the United States and Canada.

Based on the New York urban legend of the Cropsey maniac, the screenplay was written by Bob Weinstein and Peter Lawrence, from a story conceived by producer Harvey Weinstein, Tony Maylam, and Brad Grey. Rick Wakeman, of the progressive rock band Yes, composed the score.

The Burning was theatrically released on May 8, 1981, by Filmways. Its critical reception was largely unfavorable, with many film critics deriding its similarities to Friday the 13th and Friday the 13th Part 2 and its graphic violence. However, it has since become a cult classic and received positive reappraisal from film critics.

== Plot ==
One night at Camp Blackfoot, campers play a prank on Cropsy, the alcoholic and abusive caretaker, by placing a worm-infested skull with candles in the eye sockets next to his bed. When they bang on his window, he is startled and accidentally knocks the skull onto his bed, starting a fire. The flames reach a gas tank, igniting Cropsy and the cabin. Engulfed in flames, he runs outside into the river as the campers flee. Despite severe injuries, he survives.

Five years later, Cropsy is released from the hospital, still badly scarred after failed skin grafts. He conceals his disfigurement with a coat and hat. One night, a prostitute invites him to her apartment, but recoils at his burned face, prompting him to kill her with scissors. Armed with hedge trimmers, he makes his way to another summer camp, Stonewater. During a softball game, a camper narrowly avoids him.

The next morning, camper Alfred frightens female camper Sally as she exits the shower, attracting the attention of counselors Michelle, Todd, Karen, and Eddy. Michelle demands Alfred leave, but Todd learns he is bullied and only wanted revenge on Sally’s boyfriend, Glazer. Later that night, Alfred sees Cropsy outside the boys’ cabin, but no one believes him.

Todd and Michelle lead a canoe trip down Devil’s Creek. Around the campfire, Todd tells the legend of Cropsy. At the climax of the story, Eddy scares the campers wearing a mask and wielding a machete. When Eddy and Karen sneak down to the lake to skinny dip, she turns down Eddy's advances for sex, and he leaves. She gets out of the water to find her clothes taken and strewn through the forest; as she is collecting them, Cropsy appears and slashes her throat with shears.

The next day, Michelle discovers Karen and the canoes are missing. The campers build a makeshift raft to search the creek. They find one canoe, but Cropsy is hiding in it and attacks and kills five of them. That night, Glazer leaves Sally to fetch matches for a fire, and Cropsy kills her. Glazer returns and is pinned to a tree with the shears through his throat. Alfred witnesses the attack and alerts Todd, who is knocked unconscious by Cropsy while he chases Alfred. Michelle finds the bodies and leads the survivors back to camp to contact the police.

Todd regains consciousness and confronts Cropsy with an axe in an abandoned mine shaft. Cropsy traps Alfred and menaces him with a flamethrower, recalling the prank that caused his disfigurement. Alfred breaks free and stabs him in the back with shears, then Todd strikes him in the face with an axe. Alfred finishes Cropsy by setting him alight with the flamethrower. They rejoin Michelle and the police as Cropsy’s body burns.

Later, a new group of campers retells the legend of Cropsy around a campfire.

== Cast ==
- Brian Matthews as Todd
  - Keith Mandell as Young Todd
- Leah Ayres as Michelle
- Brian Backer as Alfred
- Lou David as Cropsy
- Larry Joshua as Glazer
- Jason Alexander as Dave
- Ned Eisenberg as Eddy
- Carrick Glenn as Sally
- Carolyn Houlihan as Karen
- Fisher Stevens as Woodstock
- Shelley Bruce as Tiger
- Sarah Chodoff as Barbara
- Bonnie Deroski as Marnie
- Holly Hunter as Sophie
- Kevi Kendall as Diane
- J.R. McKechnie as Fish
- George Parry as Alan
- Ame Segull as Rhoda
- Jeff De Hart as Supervisor
- Bruce Kluger as Rod
- Jerry McGee as Intern
- Mansoor Najeeullah as Orderly
- Willie Reale as Paul
- John Roach as Snoop
- K.C. Townsend as Hooker
- John Tripp as Camp Counselor
- James Van Verth as Jamie
- Therese Morreale as Girl Playing Softball

== Production ==
=== Conception ===
In 1980, Harvey Weinstein was desperate to break into the movie business. Weinstein and producing partner Michael Cohl recognized the success of low-budget horror films such as The Texas Chain Saw Massacre (1974) and Halloween (1978), and began swapping horror stories. Having heard stories about the Cropsy legend when he was a young camper in upstate New York, Weinstein brought the idea to Cohl, who loved it.

The project was initiated before the popularity of Sean S. Cunningham's sleeper hit Friday the 13th (1980), with Harvey Weinstein creating a five-page treatment in 1979 under the title "The Cropsy Maniac" and registering it in April 1980, a full month before Cunningham's film was released. Coincidentally, at the same time, director Joseph Ellison also had a film in pre-production under the title "The Burning", but changed the name to Don't Go in the House (1980) to avoid confusion with Weinstein's film. The production also bore similarities to another slasher movie in pre-production, a film that would become known as Madman (1982). In summer 1980, during a casting call for Madman, one of the actresses commented that her boyfriend was acting in The Burning. This prompted Madman to change its entire premise, which was built around the Cropsy legend. This led to a delay in its filming until October 1980, which proved costly as it didn't receive a theatrical release until January 1982. The over-saturation of genre films competing with each other was one of the side-effects of the early 1980s slasher boom.

Cohl told Variety that he, Weinstein and producer Corky Burger took an early version of the script to the 1980 Cannes Film Festival, where it was well received, although they rejected initial six-figure offers, hoping to land more money once the film had been shot. This was a similar approach to how Friday the 13th had earned distribution with Paramount Pictures.

British director Tony Maylam, known for rock music documentaries in the 1970s, was hired as The Burning's director in summer 1980. Maylam had met Weinstein and Burger while the producers worked as rock promoters.

During his discussion with film critic Alan Jones on the audio commentary of MGM's DVD, Maylam said that once he came on board things moved very quickly. The screenplay was written in just six weeks and was sculpted to conform to the emerging genre conventions of the time. As the film takes place mostly outside and is set in summer, the production had a small window of opportunity in which to make the film or it risked having to wait until the following year. Knowing that the slasher craze would not last forever, and wanting to get their film released before it fizzled out, the producers rushed into production. The screenplay was written by Peter Lawrence and Harvey's brother Bob Weinstein. Again, reflecting an understanding of slasher movie conventions of the time, the script featured a murder every ten minutes in the script. It was Maylam's idea to make gardening shears Cropsy's weapon of choice.

The film originally had a different ending. A script dated July 6, 1980 shifted the location to one much more in keeping with a summer camp slasher. Originally, the showdown was to take place in a boathouse. Another big change is that Todd ends up as the "final boy" rather than as the heroic adult, and Alfred is killed by Cropsy. Other changes included an excised character named Alan, who was to be the love interest for Tiger. This version also ends with a campfire scene, but the last line is different: "...And every year he seeks revenge for the terrible things those kids did to him ... every year he kills!"

The production company became Miramax, named after Harvey and Bob Weinstein's parents, Miriam and Max, who helped fund the picture. The budget is reported to have been between $500,000 and $1.5 million, although the latter is more often cited. Cohl admitted that the relatively inexperienced filmmakers underestimated production costs, which caused the movie to go over budget.

=== Casting ===
Casting took place in New York in the spring of 1980, and Maylam met most of the cast in person. There was a remarkably quick turnaround, as the start date for filming was August 18, 1980 (although some shooting may have taken place prior to this date). Brian Matthews and Leah Ayres were cast first. Ayres already had a successful small screen career. Maylam reportedly insisted that Matthews dye his hair brown, as he did not think he would look macho enough with blonde hair. Larry Joshua was cast as one of the kids at the camp, even though he was older in real life than either Matthews or Ayres. Like most of the cast, it was his first role, but led to a long and successful career, mostly on the small screen. The rest of the cast was hired during a series of auditions. For some of the soon-to-be-stars, such as Holly Hunter, Jason Alexander, and Fisher Stevens, The Burning was their first big screen appearance.

The Weinsteins and Maylam also secured the services of make-up supremo Tom Savini, who they flew to Pittsburgh to meet. Savini had worked on films such as Dawn of the Dead (1978), Friday the 13th (1980), Maniac (1980), and Eyes of a Stranger (1981). Savini turned down the chance to work on Friday the 13th Part 2 (1981), ostensibly because he could not understand the logic that Jason was fully grown and was now the killer, as well as what he described as "miscommunications" with the film's backers. He also said that he liked the script for The Burning more.

=== Filming ===
The Burning was shot in the late summer of 1980 around Buffalo and North Tonawanda, New York. Much of the filming took place in and around existing summer camps to give it an authentic look while keeping costs down. The cast wore their own clothes throughout the production. Many of the cast were local to the New York area and were aware of the Cropsy legend.

In the interview on the MGM DVD, Savini recalls that the cast were literally queuing up to find out how they would die, making him feel like an assassin. He was very hands-on with the production, though he did not have much time to put together the special effects. He only had three or four days to make the Cropsy make-up – the mask was created in his dressing room in-between special effects duties elsewhere on the film. In Grande Illusions, his first book on his life as a special effects guru, Savini says he based the look of Cropsy on a burnt beggar he had seen as a kid in Pittsburgh, as well as textbooks on burn victims. Due to time constraints, the resulting mask was more of a melt than a burn. Savini was pleased enough with what he had done that he subsequently agreed to go on a publicity tour for the film.

Savini expanded on his Friday the 13th experience for his work on The Burning. The scene where a victim has her throat cut by Cropsy with the shears was similar in execution to the demise of the hitchhiker in the earlier film. Cropsy's demise, when the axe smashes into his face, is an almost identical effect to a scene in Friday the 13th.

The mine system was chosen for the climactic battle between Cropsy and Todd. As an earlier script showed, it was originally meant to be a boat house at the camp, but this was switched to a cave system. Indeed, another subsequent version of the script has a scene in Cropsy's lair, where he looks over old newspaper clippings. Maylam says it was changed again to the copper mine because they found bats roosting in the boat house and considered it unsafe.

Maylam has recalled that Carolyn Houlihan, who was Miss Ohio USA in 1979, found her nude scenes extremely difficult to do. Carrick Glenn, who also had a nude scene, was relaxed in front of the camera, according to the director.

Maylam maintains that he was Cropsy for about 90% of the movie, as he could not get anyone else to hold the shears the way he wanted (to perfect the gleam bouncing off the metal).

=== Post-production ===
The film was edited by Jack Sholder, who went on shortly to direct the first film for New Line Cinema, the slasher Alone in the Dark (1982), starring Jack Palance, Martin Landau, and Donald Pleasence. He also directed A Nightmare on Elm Street 2: Freddy's Revenge (1985), a sequel to the 1984 classic.

Maylam has said that there was talk of a sequel at the time The Burning was wrapping; however, Maylam was leery of being type-cast as a horror director and the disappointing box office performance of the original stalled the sequel's production.

== Promotion and release ==
According to Maylam, the film received a very good response at test screenings. In February 1981, Filmways Pictures picked up the rights to distribute the film from Miramax for an undisclosed sum after viewing it in Los Angeles. According to Variety, Filmways was in financial difficulties and saw an opportunity to make quick money during the slasher boom. The company had already produced Brian De Palma's Dressed to Kill (1980), which had made serious money the previous year. Filmways also released horror thrillers such as The Town That Dreaded Sundown (1976), Without Warning (1980), and The Last House on the Left (1972). Filmways originally was intent on renaming the film Tales Around the Campfire due to its now-iconic campfire scenes, but its original title remained. The film was subsequently sold to foreign territories including Britain, Germany, France, Spain and Japan at the 1981 Cannes Film Festival.

=== Box office ===
The film opened on May 8, 1981, in Florida on 110 screens, with a regional rollout following on May 22.

According to Variety, the film did especially well in Buffalo, near where it had been filmed, playing in three theaters and two drive-ins, bringing in $33,000. Interest soon fizzled, and the film suffered a more than 50% drop-off in box office receipts the following week. Despite this brief bright spot, overall box office for The Burning was initially low. It stayed in the top 50 for four weeks, bringing in $270,508. Variety reported it received a "chilly reception" in San Francisco and Chicago. Unlike in Buffalo, it opened elsewhere to stiff competition: it debuted at number 23 behind slasher films Happy Birthday to Me, which was at number one, and Friday the 13th Part 2 at number two; however, The Burning also opened on far fewer screens than those wider releases.

The oversaturation of the slasher film market did not help draw in audiences to The Burning. Aside from playing against Friday the 13th Part 2, which featured a very similar plot, the film suffered from competition with Happy Birthday to Me, Final Exam, The Fan, Graduation Day, Eyes of a Stranger, and a successful re-release of Tobe Hooper's The Texas Chain Saw Massacre. The success of Friday the 13th Part 2 hampered The Burning's attendance, as the audience flocked to the known series instead.

The Burning opened in New York with new poster artwork (showing a face with a fire reflected in an eye) on November 5, 1982, distributed by Orion Pictures, which had recently merged with Filmways. The New York Times film critic Janet Maslin's gave it a scathing review. An ad in Variety from November 17 noted that the film had grossed $401,258 in seven days. Its last week on the Variety sample chart was December 8, where it slipped from 78 screens the previous week to 8 that week, with a final gross of $707,770.

Promotional press artwork exists under the title Cropsy, but it is unclear when the film played in theaters under that title, as it was a common practice to give films multiple names in an effort to trick audiences into seeing it several times. According to the MPAA site, it may have also played under the title Campfire Tales. These releases and re-releases make it difficult to find a definitive box office tally for the film.

According to Tony Maylam, the film sold well around the world, making back its $1.5 million budget. The film performed well in Japan when it was released there in September 1981. Variety reported it making a total of $283,477 in a week at just four cinemas in Tokyo. In its first 16 days, it grossed $1.2 million from 11 theatres in Japan.

The film was released to British screens on November 5, 1981, by HandMade Films, where it was met with modest success. Within a couple of weeks it was made into a double feature with When a Stranger Calls (1979), which did not boost its fortunes, as Variety said it soon "hit the skids" with "pathetic" results.

=== Censorship ===
Despite the graphic gore effects of slasher films being the driving force behind their box office success, the MPAA gave in to the critical reception and reaction of pressure groups who were protesting the films in the wake of violent acts, such as the assassination of John Lennon, and the growing debate about violence in the media. The Burning was heavily trimmed to receive its R rating. The film remained cut in the United States until its 2007 DVD release that restored the scenes of gore.

The British cinema release of The Burning was severely cut as well by the BBFC, receiving an X certificate on September 23, 1981, with cuts to the scissor murder of the prostitute and some gore during the raft attack. When the film was accidentally released uncut on video in the United Kingdom by Thorn EMI, the tape was liable for seizure and prosecution under the Obscene Publications Acts. Thorn-EMI had unwittingly released a "video nasty", a term used to describe films judged as obscene and too violent for home rental. They tried to rectify matters by reissuing a BBFC-approved version. The original uncut Thorn-EMI release is worth a great deal of money today. In 1992, the United Kingdom video re-release suffered additional cuts to the raft attack, plus cuts to the killing of Karen. It was finally released fully uncut in 2002.

=== Critical response ===
On Rotten Tomatoes, the film has an approval rating of 86% based on reviews from 14 critics. On Metacritic, the film has a weighted average score of 42 out of 100, based on reviews from 5 critics, indicating "mixed or average reviews".

A number of critics noted the film's graphic violence and parallels to Friday the 13th (1980) and its sequel: On his weekly "Sneak Previews" show with Gene Siskel, Roger Ebert chose the film as one of the critics' "Dogs of the Week"; Ebert was particularly unimpressed by the film's similarity to Friday the 13th Part II, another slasher film from the summer of 1981 that he despised. Bill Cosford of the Miami Herald praised the film's dialogue and special effects as convincing, but similarly noted that it bore too many similarities to films such as Friday the 13th and Friday the 13th Part II. Joe Baltake of the Philadelphia Daily News also compared the film to Friday the 13th, but added that, where that film "is periodically nasty, The Burning is all nastiness." A review published in Variety was similarly critical of the film, describing it as derivative and overtly violent.

Janet Maslin of The New York Times wrote: "The Burning makes a few minor departures from the usual cliches of its genre, though it carefully preserves the violence and sadism that are schlock horror's sine qua non".

The Time Out film guide wrote: "Suspensewise, it's proficient enough, but familiarity with this sort of stuff can breed contempt". Kim Newman of Empire magazine was critical of the film for being "an obvious imitation of Friday the 13th" but praised Tom Savini's special effects. AllMovie wrote: "With deliberant pacing and shocking scenes of full-on gore, The Burning delivers on the creep-out levels and would probably be better regarded if not for the boom of familiar flicks that came out after this release". While reviewing the film's 2013 Blu-ray release from Scream Factory, Scott Weinberg of Fearnet wrote, "[The Burning is] dated and sort of dull. But there's some amazing gore, and the new Blu-ray makes it shine". Leonard Maltin gave the film one out of a possible four stars, calling it "[an] awful Friday the 13th rip-off".

=== Home media ===
The Burning was released on DVD in North America for the first time ever on September 11, 2007, by MGM Home Entertainment. The DVD contains several extras, including a commentary by director Tony Maylam, a featurette covering Savini's make-up effects, a stills gallery, and the theatrical trailer. Despite the DVD cover displaying the 'R' rating, the print used is the full uncut version.

Shout! Factory released The Burning on Blu-ray Disc/DVD Combo Pack on May 21, 2013, under their sub-label Scream Factory. In May 2023, Scream Factory announced a Ultra HD Blu-ray release that came out on July 11, 2023.

== Soundtrack ==
The Burning

Soundtrack album by Rick Wakeman
- Released: 1981
- Recorded: 1981
- Studios: Workshoppe Recording Studios, New York
- Genre: Progressive rock
- Length: 35.42
- Labels: Charisma (UK); Varèse Sarabande (USA)
- Producer: Rick Wakeman

Rick Wakeman chronology
| Rhapsodies (1979) | The Burning (1981) | 1984 (1981) |

A soundtrack album featuring Rick Wakeman's score was released on LP in 1981 in Europe, and shortly after in the United States and Japan. It includes music from the film and rock band arrangements by Wakeman, known as The Wakeman Variations, as well as selections from the score, written by Alan Brewer and Anna Pepper. Brewer was musical director for the film and co-producer of the score and soundtrack album with Wakeman.

The soundtrack was released in the United Kingdom for the first time on CD in February 2007.

Track listing

1. "Theme from The Burning" – 3:32
2. "The Chase Continues (Po's Plane)" – 3:53
3. "Variations on the Fire" – 5:13
4. "Shear Terror and More" – 4:39
5. "The Burning (End Title Theme)" – 2:00
6. "Campfire Story" – 3:08
7. "The Fire" – 3:25
8. "Doin' It" – 2:42
9. "Devil's Creek Breakdown" – 2:21
10. "The Chase" – 2:00
11. "Shear Terror" – 2:49

== Legacy ==
Many people involved in The Burning have gone onto achieve great success. Harvey Weinstein's gofer Brad Grey, who received a writing credit on The Burning, became the chairman and CEO of Paramount Pictures, a position he held from 2005 until his death in 2017. Grey produced eight of the ten top-grossing films to come from the studio. Actress Holly Hunter won an Academy Award in 1993 for her performance in The Piano, and was also nominated for her performances in Broadcast News (1987), The Firm (1993), and Thirteen (2003), as well as winning two Emmy Awards and receiving seven nominations. Jason Alexander would star in the long-running, critically acclaimed sitcom Seinfeld as George Costanza. Fisher Stevens would star in The Flamingo Kid (1984) and Short Circuit (1986), before turning to documentary directing, where he won an Academy Award for his film The Cove (2010) and an Independent Spirit Award for Crazy Love (2007).

The film was cited by Hifumi Kono as being the inspiration for Bobby Barrow's signature scissors weapon in Clock Tower.

In 2009, writer-director Joshua Zeman and director Barbara Brancaccio released a documentary titled Cropsey, which details the Cropsey maniac urban legend on which The Burning is based. Despite sharing little connection to The Burning, the film re-ignited the popular mythos of the character.

In 2017, Complex magazine named The Burning the 12th-best slasher film of all time. The following year, Paste included it in their list of "The 50 Best Slasher Movies of All Time", while Cropsy was ranked the 12th-greatest slasher villain of all time by LA Weekly.

In October 2017, former-production assistant Paula Wachowiak alleged that producer Harvey Weinstein's history of predatory behavior went back as far as the initial filming of The Burning in June 1980. Then a 24-year-old University at Buffalo graduate and divorced mother, Wachowiak was tasked with getting Weinstein to sign checks for an auditor working with the production's accounting department. When Wachowiak arrived at Weinstein's hotel room to have him sign the checks, he allegedly answered the door wearing only a towel, that he then dropped and asked for a massage from his employee. When Wachowiak refused, she alleges that Weinstein harassed her about the incident through the rest of the film's production, up until the film's May 1981 premiere.
