= Clara Peller =

American TV personality (1902–1987)

- Publicity headshot
- Born: August 4, 1902; Polotsk, Vitebsk Governorate, Imperial Russia
- Died: August 11, 1987 (aged 85); Chicago, Illinois, U.S.
- Occupations: Manicurist, television personality
- Spouse: William Peller (divorced)
- Children: 2

Clara Peller (born Rocha Swerdlova; (Note: Russian: Рахиль Wолфовна Свердлова Hebrew: רָחֵל סברדלוב) August 4, 1902 – August 11, 1987) was a Russian-born American manicurist and television personality who, already an octogenarian, starred in the 1984 "Where's the beef?" advertising campaign for the Wendy's fast food restaurant chain, created by the Dancer Fitzgerald Sample advertising agency.

== Life and career ==
Born in Polotsk (Note: Spelled "Politska" on immigration documents) in Imperial Russia, in 1902, one of eight or nine children born to Jewish parents Wolf Swerdlove (originally Swerdlov/Sverdlov; died 1949) and Yudis (aka "Julia" or "Judith") Tilkin (or Tilken; died 1952), young Clara spent most of her early life in Chicago. Her father left Russia in February 1906 when he was being drafted for the second time, and after arriving in Boston, Massachusetts, they settled down in Illinois. At age 20, Clara married a local jeweler, William Peller. They had a son (Leslie) and a daughter (Marlene), but later divorced. She never remarried. She worked for 35 years as a manicurist at a Chicago beauty salon, and later moved to the suburban North Shore area to be near her daughter, Marlene Necheles.

At age 80, Peller was hired as a temporary manicurist for a television commercial set in a Chicago barbershop. Impressed by her no-nonsense manners and unique voice, the agency later asked her to sign a contract as an actress for the agency. Though hard of hearing and suffering from emphysema, which limited her ability to speak long lines of dialogue, Peller was quickly used in a number of TV spot advertisements. She first attracted attention as a comical cleaning lady in an advertisement for the new Massachusetts State Lottery game "Megabucks", and later nationally in a series of commercials for the Wendy's restaurant chain.

=== Wendy's campaign ===
First airing on January 10, 1984, the Wendy's commercial portrayed a fictional fast-food competitor named "Big Bun", where three elderly ladies are served an enormous hamburger bun containing a minuscule hamburger patty. While the two soft-spoken of the three women are commenting on the size of the bun, they are interrupted by an irascible Peller, who looks around in vain for customer assistance while making the outraged demand: "Where's the beef?" Sequels featured a crotchety Peller yelling her famous line in various scenes, such as storming drive-thru counters, or in telephone calls to a fast-food executive attempting to relax on his yacht, the S.S. Big Bun.

Peller's "Where's the beef?" line instantly became a catchphrase across the United States and Canada. The diminutive octogenarian actress made the three-word phrase a cultural phenomenon, and herself a cult star. At Wendy's, sales jumped 31% to $945 million in 1985 worldwide. Wendy's senior vice president for communications, Denny Lynch, stated at the time that "with Clara we accomplished as much in five weeks as we did in 14 1/2 years." Former Vice President Walter Mondale also used the line against rival Senator Gary Hart in his bid for the Democratic presidential nomination in the 1984 campaign.

While hugely popular, the advertising campaign proved to be short-lived, at least for Wendy's. Peller had made actor-scale wages — $317.40 per day — for the initial Wendy's TV commercial of the campaign in January 1984. Her fee for subsequent work as a Wendy's spokesperson was not disclosed, though Peller acknowledged in an interview with People magazine that she had earned $30,000 from the first two commercials and profits from product tie-in sales. Wendy's later stated that the company had paid Peller a total of $500,000 for her work on the campaign, though Peller denied earning that much.

Per the terms of her Screen Actors Guild union contract, the actress was free to participate in any commercials for products, goods or services, which did not directly compete with Wendy's hamburgers. She subsequently signed a contract with the Campbell's to appear in an advertisement for Prego Pasta Plus spaghetti sauce. In the Prego commercial, Peller examines the Prego sauce and after wondering "Where's the beef?" declares, "I found it! I really found it". However, after the Prego commercial aired on television in 1985, Wendy's management decided to terminate her contract, contending that the Prego commercial implies "that Clara found the beef at somewhere other than Wendy's restaurants". In announcing the dismissal, Wendy's Denny Lynch stated, "Clara can find the beef only in one place, and that is Wendy's". Peller responded, "I've made them millions, and they don't appreciate me."

Following the conclusion of the "Where's the beef?" campaign, Wendy's Restaurants entered a two-year sales slump. Vice President Lynch later admitted that consumer awareness of the Wendy's brand did not recover for another five years, with the advent of a new, humorous line of TV commercials featuring the brand's founder, Dave Thomas.

=== Final appearances and death ===
Despite the setback with Wendy's, Peller continued to make the most of her newfound fame, granting numerous press interviews and making several guest TV appearances. She regularly amused interviewers and friends by claiming not to know exactly how old she was, once telling a frustrated Social Security clerk (who was given three different ages by Peller) that she was "whichever one will get me Social Security."

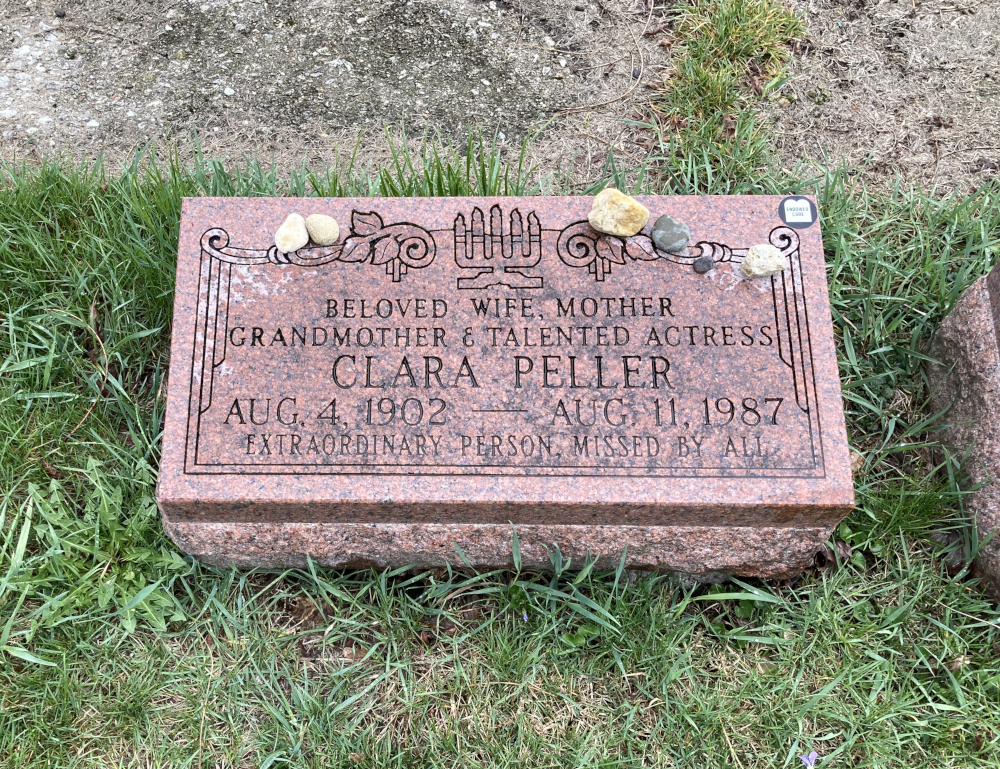
Peller's grave at Waldheim Jewish Cemetery

On April 14, 1984, Peller made an uncredited cameo appearance on Saturday Night Live which was hosted that night by 1972 Democratic presidential candidate George McGovern. She also made an appearance in the low-budget 1985 Neal Israel comedy Moving Violations. In Larry Cohen's horror movie The Stuff, she appeared with Abe Vigoda in a commercial. In the "Remote Control Man" episode of the Steven Spielberg show Amazing Stories, she had a cameo appearance as a disgruntled motorist. On April 7, 1986, she made an appearance at WrestleMania 2 at Chicago's Rosemont Horizon, where she was the guest timekeeper for the 20-man invitational over-the top-rope battle royal involving both wrestlers and NFL players of the 1970s and 1980s.

Peller died on August 11, 1987, in Chicago, one week after her 85th birthday, from congestive heart disease. She is buried at Waldheim Jewish Cemetery in Forest Park, Illinois.

Daughter Marlene Necheles published a biography in 2010, Clara Peller: An American Icon, then collaborated with Geoff Shell on a musical, Clara and the Beef, based on her biography.
