= Sue Downey =

American former model and beauty queen (born 1945)

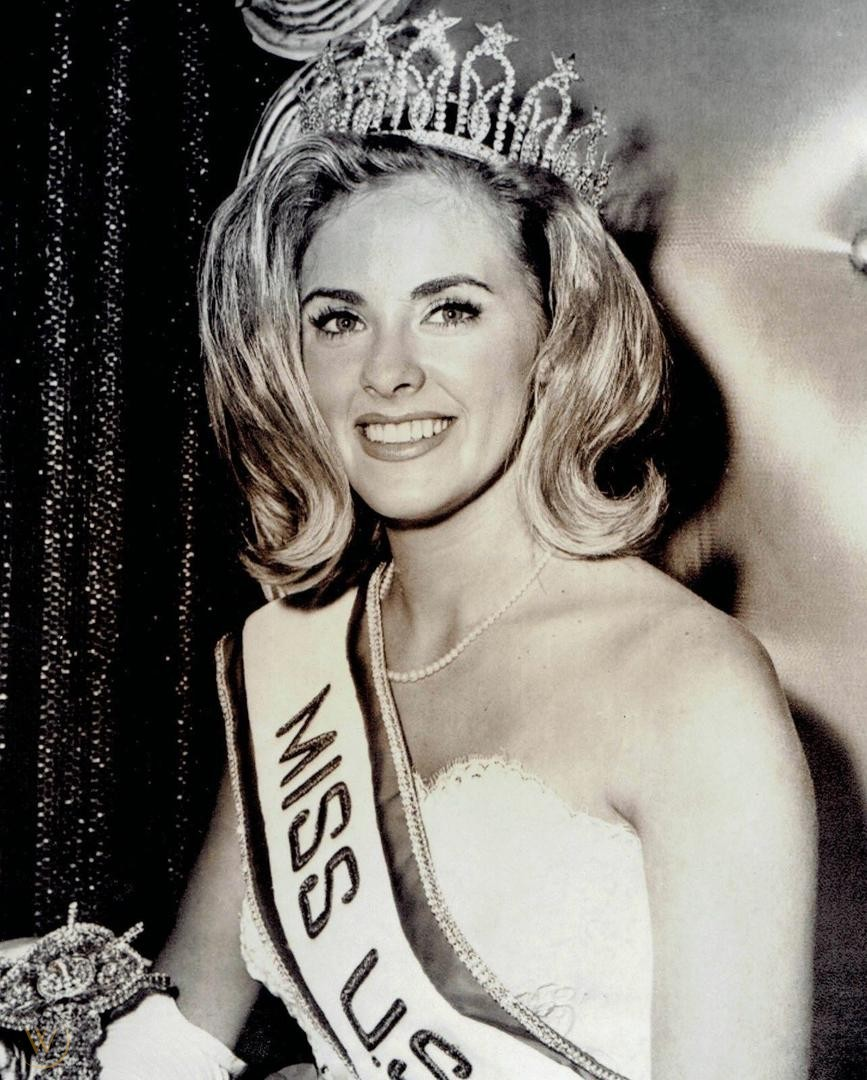
- Downey after winning Miss USA 1965
- Born: Sue Ann Downey; May 8, 1945 (age 81); Lima, Ohio, U.S.
- Beauty pageant titleholder
- Title: Miss Ohio USA 1965; Miss USA 1965
- Major competition: Miss Ohio USA 1965 (Winner) Miss USA 1965 (Winner) Miss Universe 1965 (2nd Runner-Up) (Best National Costume)

Sue Ann Downey (born May 8, 1945) is an American former model and beauty pageant titleholder who has held the Miss USA 1965 title and competed in the Miss Universe 1965 she where placed in 2nd Runner-Up.

Downey won the Miss Ohio USA title and then the Miss USA 1965 title. She later competed in the Miss Universe 1965 pageant, where she placed Second Runner-Up and the recipient of the Best National Costume award.
