= Miss Ohio USA =

Beauty pageant competition

- Formation: 1952
- Type: Beauty pageant
- Headquarters: Cincinnati
- Location: Ohio
- Members: Miss USA
- Official language: English
- Key people: Melissa Proctor-Pitchford, state pageant director
- Website: Official website

The Miss Ohio USA competition is the pageant that selects the representative for the state of Ohio in the Miss USA pageant, and the name of the title held by that winner. It has previously been known as Miss Ohio Universe. It is produced by Proctor Productions.

The pageant is currently held in Springfield and has previously been hosted by Mentor, Steubenville and Portsmouth.

Two Ohio representatives, Sue Downey in 1965 and Kim Seelbrede in 1981, have won the Miss USA title and competed in the Miss Universe pageant.

The most notable Miss Ohio USA is actress and Oscar winner Halle Berry, who was 1st runner up at Miss USA 1986. Other notable former titleholders include actress, model and sportscaster Jayne Kennedy and two former Survivor contestants, Kim Mullen of Survivor: Palau and Candace Smith of Survivor: Tocantins. Two Miss Ohio USA titleholders have previously competed at Miss Teen USA. Two have also competed at Miss America. The most recent placement was Macy Hudson placing 4th runner-up in 2024.

The current titleholder is Kayelin Tiggs of Dayton and was appointed on July 30th, 2026 after the open casting call from Thomas Brodeur, the new owner of the national pageant. She will represent Ohio at Miss USA 2026.

== Gallery of titleholders ==
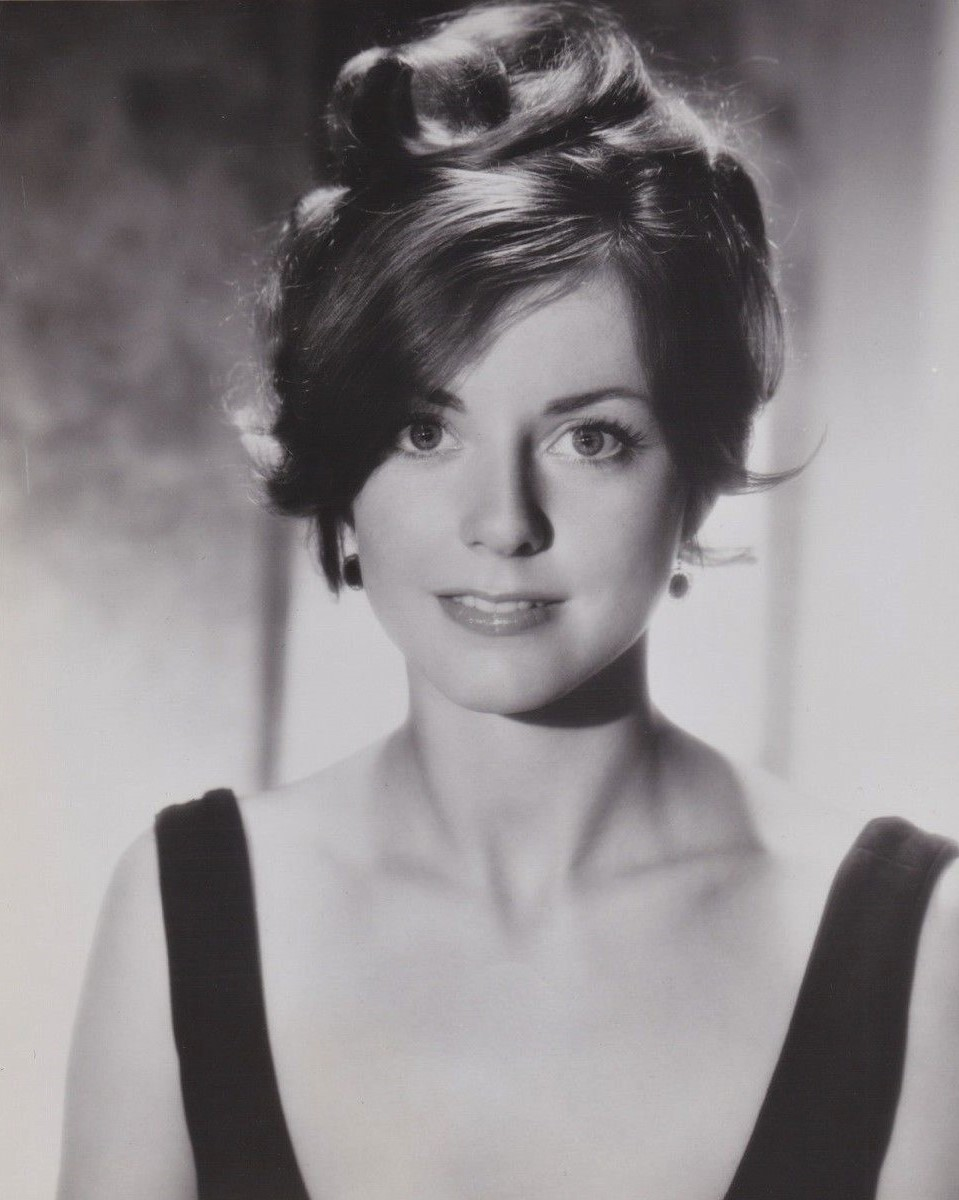
Katherine Justice, Miss Ohio USA 1960, seen in her film The Way West

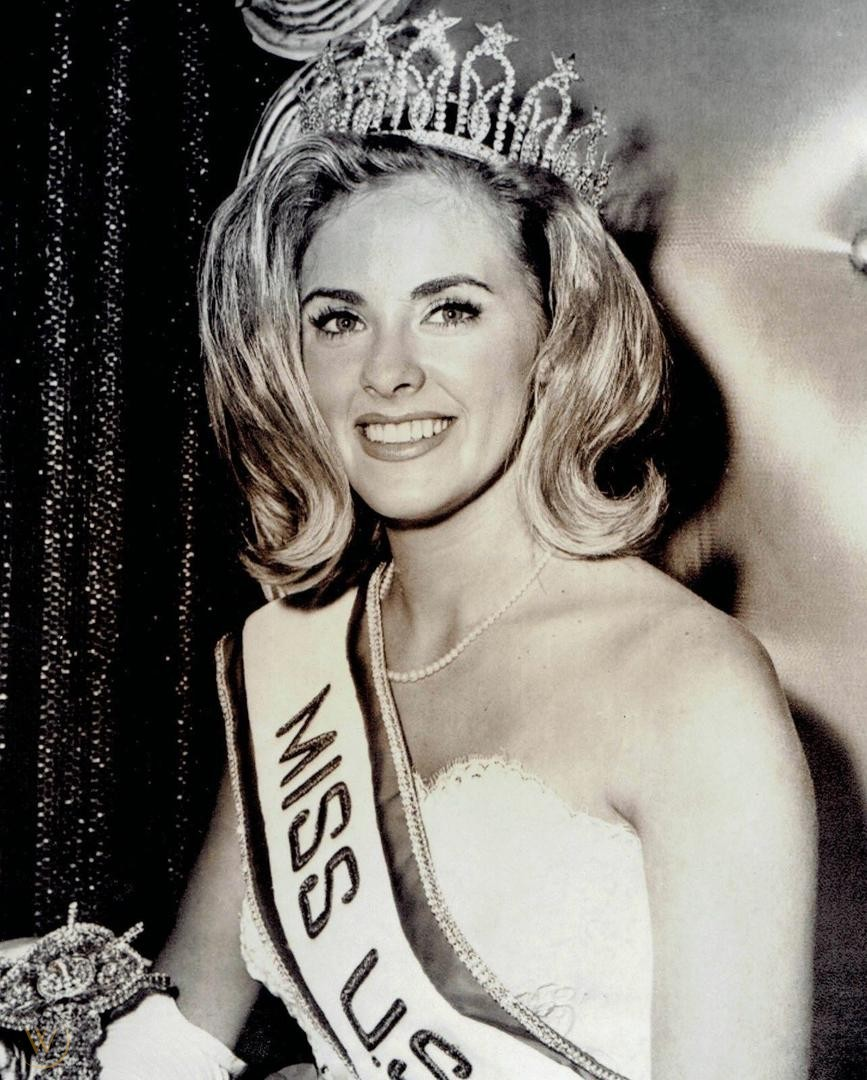
Sue Downey, Miss Ohio USA 1965 & Miss USA 1965

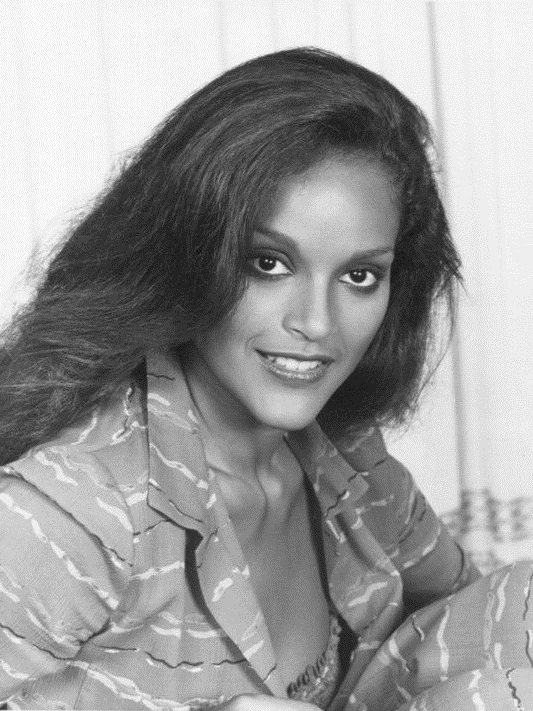
Jane Harrison, Miss Ohio USA 1970 (pictured in 1980)

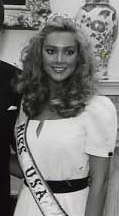
Kim Seelbrede, Miss Ohio USA 1981 & Miss USA 1981

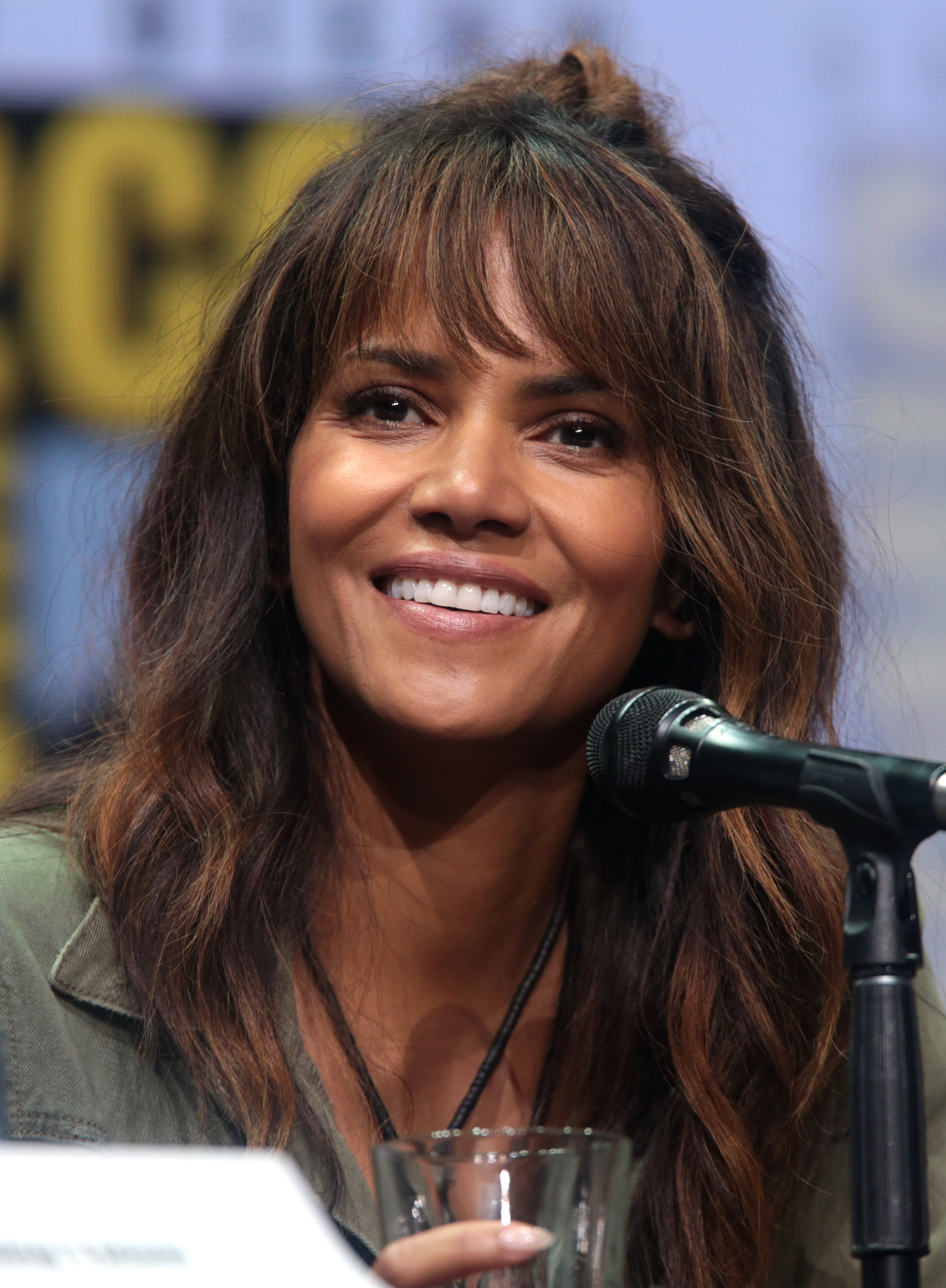
Halle Berry, Miss Ohio USA 1986 and Miss World USA 1986

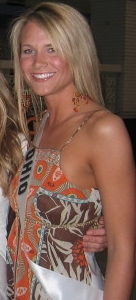
Stacy Offenberger, Miss Ohio USA 2006 and Miss Ohio Teen USA 1998

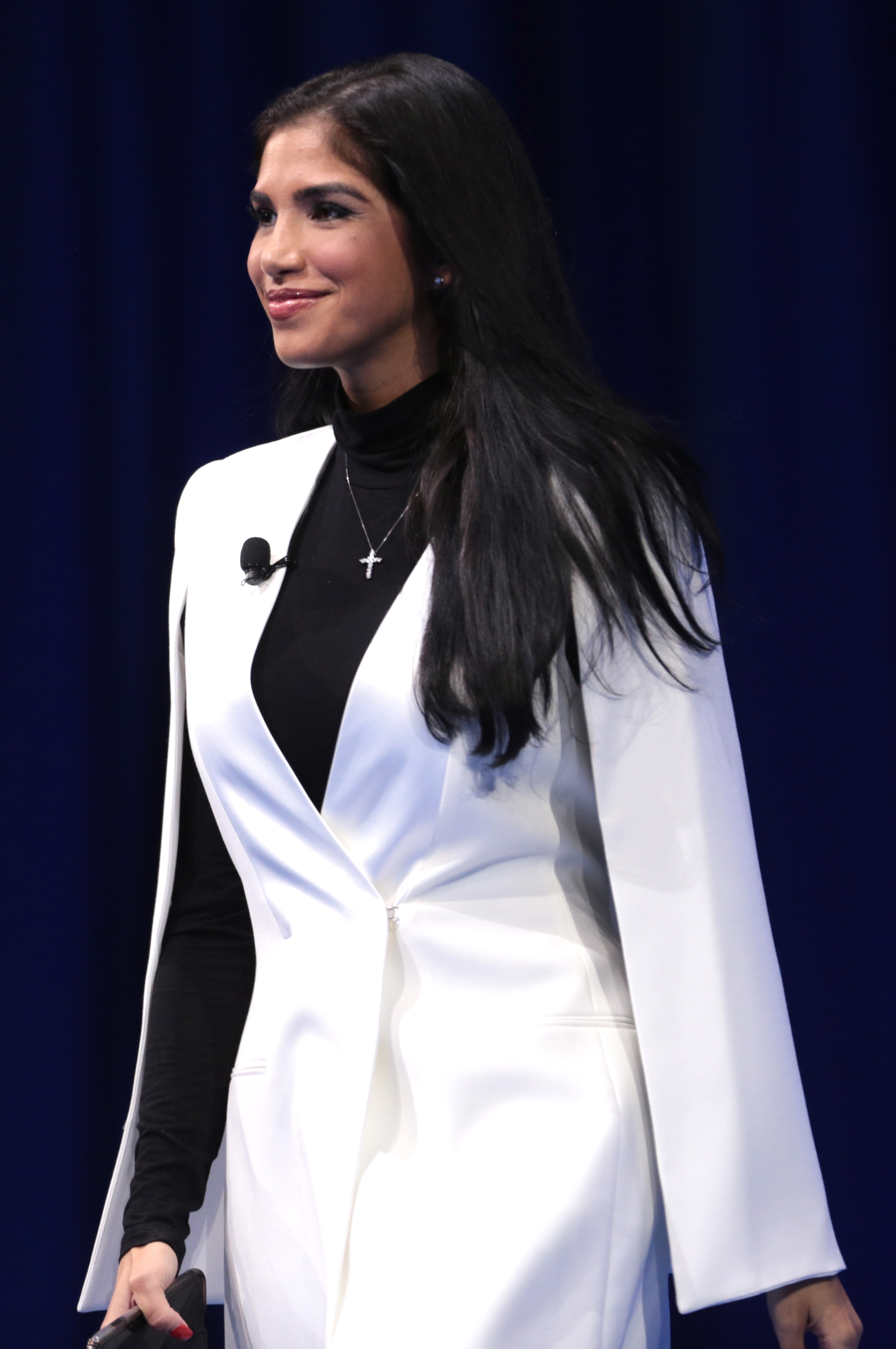
Madison Gesiotto, Miss Ohio USA 2014

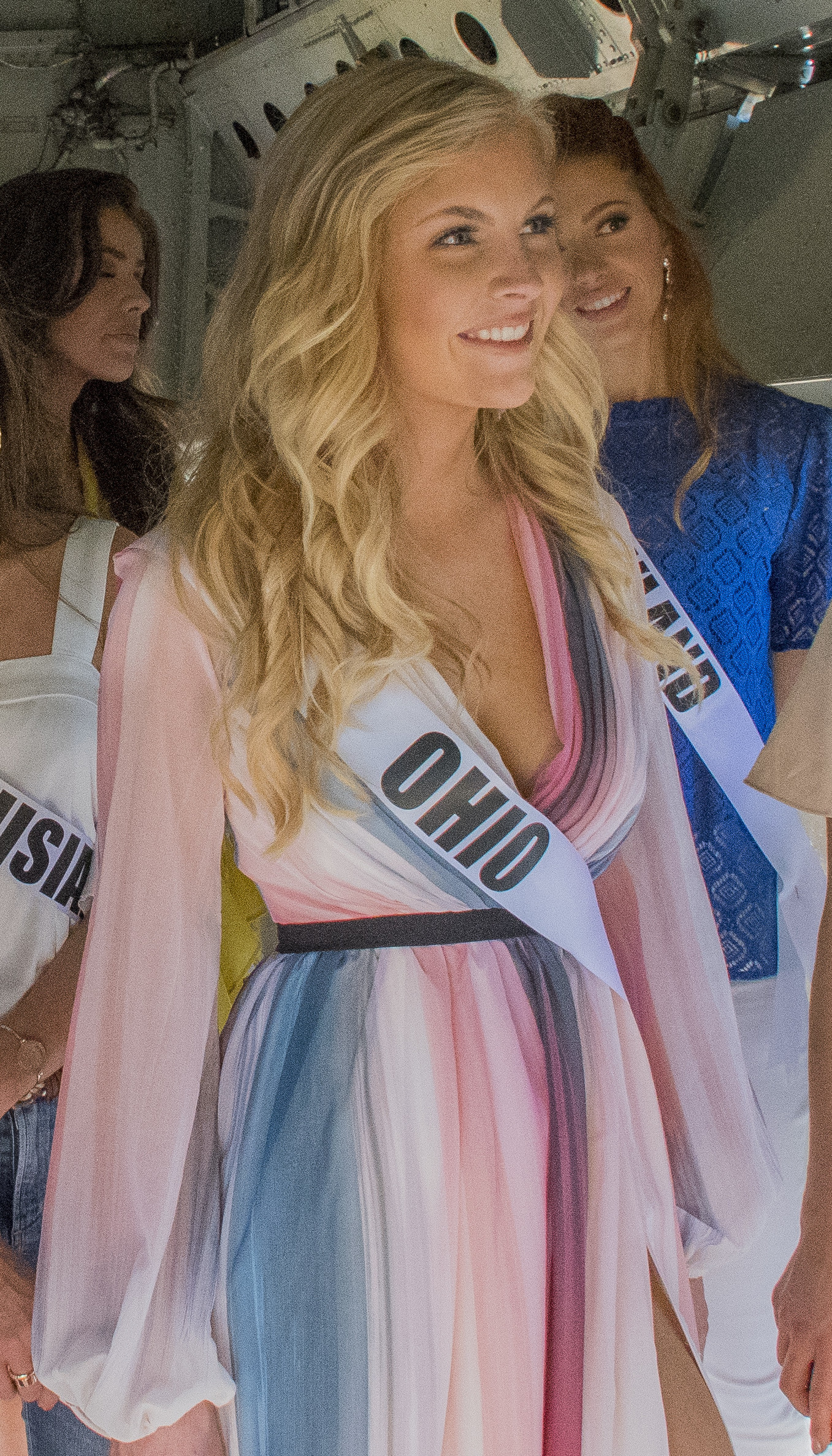
Deneen Penn, Miss Ohio USA 2018

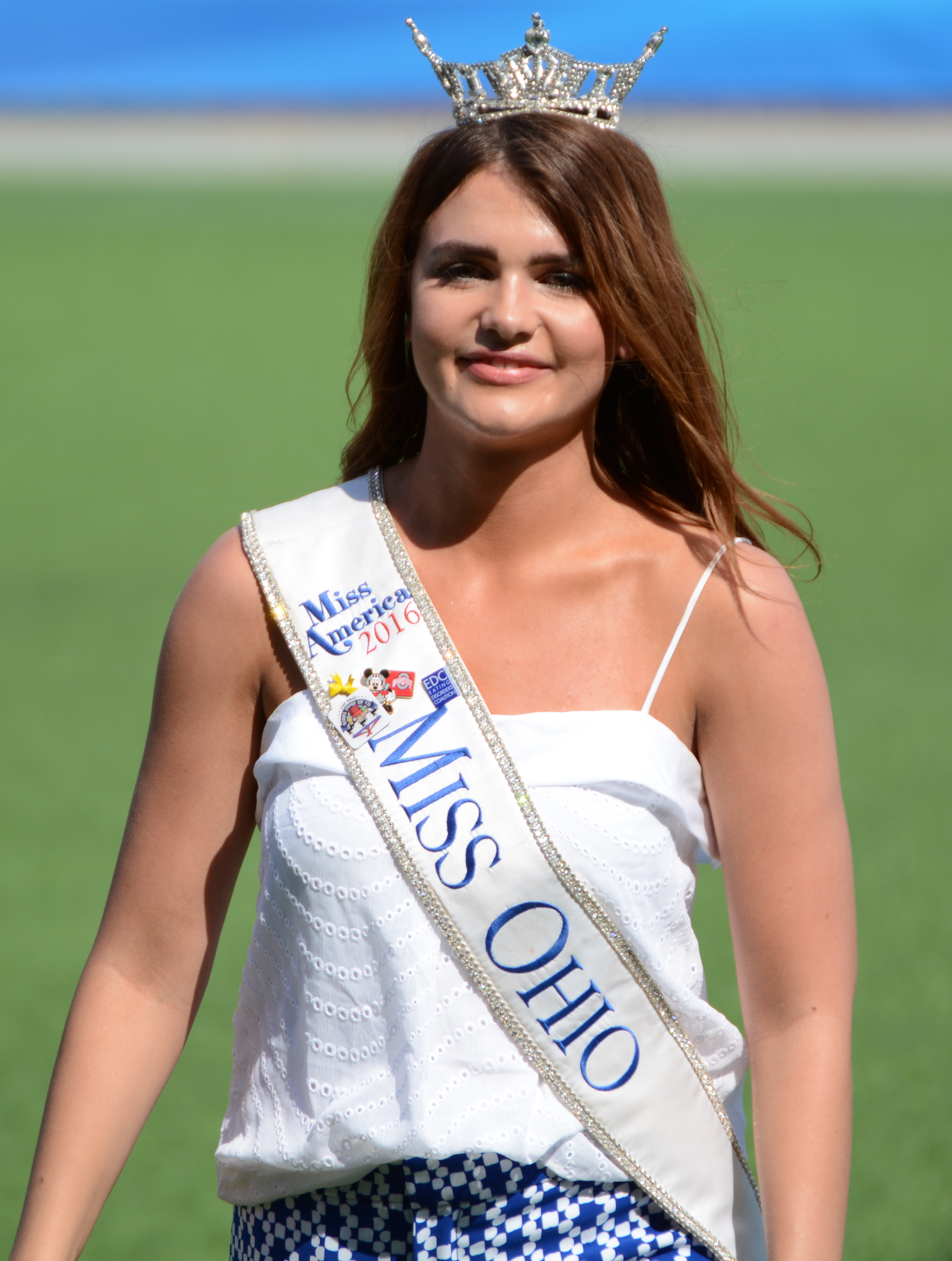
Alice Magoto, Miss Ohio USA 2019 (when she was Miss Ohio 2016)

== Results summary ==
- Miss USAs: Sue Downey (1965), Kim Seelbrede (1981)
- 1st runner-up: Halle Berry (1986)
- 2nd runner-up: Audrey Bolte (2012)
- 3rd runners-up: Kim Weeda (1982), Stacy Offenberger (2006), Sir'Quora Carroll (2022)
- 4th runners-up: Kathryn Gabriel (1957), Kathleen Kehlmier (1972), Macy Hudson (2024)
- Top 10/12: Melissa Proctor (1990), Melinda Miller (1999), Kristin Smith (2013), Alice Magoto (2019)
- Top 15/16: Eleanore Mack (1953), Barbara Randa (1954), Eleanor Wood (1956), Corrine Huff (1960), Gail Krielow (1964), Karen Dietz (1966), Linda Hoyle (1968), Jane Harrison (1970), Megan Wise (2016), Sthephanie Miranda (2020)

Ohio holds a record of 24 placements at Miss USA.

=== Awards ===
- Miss Photogenic: Kim Thomas (1980)
- Miss Congeniality: Monica Day (2008)
- Best State Costume: Kim Thomas (1980), Kim Weeda (1982)

== Winners ==
Color key

- Winner
- Runner-up
- Finalists or semifinalist

Year	Name	Hometown	Age (Note: Age at the time of the Miss USA pageant)	Local title	Placement at Miss USA	Special awards at Miss USA	Notes
2026	Kayelin Tiggs	Dayton	34	Miss Dayton			
2025	Hannah Klein	Cincinnati	33	Miss Queen City			
2024	Macy Hudson	Dayton	24	Miss Gem City	4th Runner-up		
2023	Mackenzie Schutt	Westerville	27	Miss Central Ohio			
2022	Sir'Quora Carrol	Canal Winchester	23	Miss Franklin County	3rd runner-up		
2021	Nicole Wess	Cincinnati	22	Miss Cincinnati Metro			Shortest reigning Miss Ohio USA at 10 months and 11 days
2020	Sthephanie Miranda	Campbell	26	Miss Campbell	Top 16		Born in Puerto Rico; Previously Miss Ohio Latina 2013; Previously Miss Ohio International 2015; Previously Miss Latinoamerica 2018; Longest reigning Miss Ohio USA (1 year, 8 months, and 1 day); Later Miss Grand United States 2023, 3rd runner-up at Miss Grand International 2023
2019	Alice Louisa Magoto	Cincinnati	20	Miss Hyde Park	Top 10		Previously Miss Ohio 2016
2018	Deneen Paige Penn	Cortland	20	Miss Cortland			
2017	Dinaleigh Baxter	Winchester	23	Miss Winchester			
2016	Megan Wise	Gallipolis	26	Miss Gallia County	Top 15		
2015	Sarah Newkirk	Columbus	25	Miss Capital City			
2014	Madison Mari Gesiotto	Massillon	21	Miss Mid Ohio			
2013	Kristin Smith	Dayton	21	Miss Dayton	Top 10		
2012	Audrey Claire Bolte	Batavia	21	Miss Batavia	2nd runner-up		
2011	Ashley Nicole Caldwell	Gallipolis	24	Miss Northwest Ohio			
2010	Amanda Tempel	St. Bernard	19	Miss St. Bernard			
2009	Natasha Aristea Vivoda	Champion	22	Miss Trumbull County			
2008	Monica Day Boggs	Whitehall	25	Miss Greater Ohio	Miss Congeniality		
2007	Anna Melomud	Richmond Heights	22	Miss Richmond Heights			
2006	Stacy Nicole Offenberger	Vincent	26	Miss Washington County	3rd runner-up		Previously Miss Ohio Teen USA 1998
2005	Aisha Berry	Cincinnati	25	Miss Southwest Ohio			
2004	Lauren Kelsey Hall	Wellston	20	Miss Wellston			
2003	Candace Elizabeth Smith	Dayton	26				Contestant on Survivor: Tocantins
2002	Kimberly "Kim" Danelle Mullen	Huber Heights	23	Miss Dublin			Contestant on Survivor: Palau
2001	Amanda Jane Canary	Columbus	19				
2000	Cheya Ranice Watkins	Cincinnati	26				Previously Miss Ohio 1998
1999	Melinda Miller	Ottoville	25		Semi-finalist		
1998	Cynthia Madden	Anderson Township	18				
1997	Michelle Mouser	Columbus	23				Previously Miss Ohio Teen USA 1991
1996	Melissa Boyd	Massillon	22				
1995	Julia Hughes	Grove City	22				
1994	Lisa Michelle Allison	Gahanna	18				
1993	Andrea Pacione	North Royalton					
1992	Courtney Lea Baber	Cincinnati					
1991	Amy Glaze	Lucasville					
1990	Melissa Proctor	West Chester	22		Semi-finalist		Current director of Michigan, Ohio, Kentucky and Pennsylvania (both Miss and Teen USA) pageants under her married name, Melissa Proctor-Pitchford
1989	Lisa Thompson	Marion					
1988	Gina West	Pickerington					
1987	Hallie Bonnell	Akron					Later Mrs. Illinois America 2007 as Hallie Thompson; Mrs. Photogenic winner at Mrs. America 2007; Mother of Christina Thompson, Miss New Jersey Teen USA 2013 and Miss Virginia USA 2021
1986	Halle Maria Berry	Oakwood	19		1st runner-up		5th runner-up at Miss World 1986, actress and Academy Award winner, Miss Teen All American 1985
1985	Lisa Barlow	Vandalia					
1984	Roxie Erwin	Pickerington					
1983	Gina Gangale	Youngstown					
1982	Kimberly Ann "Kim" Weeda	Dayton	21		3rd runner-up	Best State Costume	Top 5 in Miss Ohio USA 1980
1981	Kimberly "Kim" Kaye Seelbrede	Germantown	20		Miss USA 1981		Semi-finalist at Miss Universe 1981
1980	Elizabeth Kim Thomas	Cincinnati	20			Miss Photogenic; Best State Costume	Top 5 in Miss Ohio USA 1979
1979	Carolyn Houlihan	Youngstown					
1978	Sheila Anderson	Cincinnati	19				
1977	Lesa Rummell	Paris	19				Mother of Miss Teen USA 2005 Allie LaForce; Later Miss Ohio World 1978
1976	Karen Myers	Columbus					
1975	Sandra Kurdas	Conneaut					
1974	Kay Phillips	Bedford	21				
1973	Jackie Urbanek	Cleveland					Represented Ohio at Miss World USA 1974
1972	Kathleen Ann Kehlmier	Columbus	18		4th runner-up		
1971	Karen Haus	Chagrin Falls					
1970	Jane Harrison	Wickliffe	18		Semi-finalist		Actress, model and sportscaster; past host of The NFL Today
1969	Marlynn Singleton	Westerville	18				Assumed title
1969	Terry Chellis	Columbus	21				Hospitalised for haemorrhaging after checking in for Miss USA and was unable to compete
1968	Linda Hoyle	Columbus	21		Semi-finalist		
1967	Phyllis Smith	Caldwell					
1966	Karen Dietz	Willoughby	21		Semi-finalist		
1965	Sue Ann Downey	Columbus	20		Miss USA 1965		Second runner-up at Miss Universe 1965
1964	Gail Karen Krielow	Richmond Heights	20		Semi-finalist		1st runner up at Miss International 1965
1963	Gloria Jean McBride	Columbus					
1963	Andrea Getzlaff	Solon	17				Disqualified for being underage
1962	Joan Carole Colucy	Massillon					
1961	Alice Lou Englemann	Ashtabula					
1960	Corrine Huff	Youngstown	19		Semi-finalist		Replaced Justice for the title; First African American representing an American state in a national beauty contest"
1960	Katherine "Kathy" Justice	Poland	17		—N/a		Withdrawn because younger than 18 for Miss Universe
1959	Marie Dicarlo	Poland					
1958	Cindy Ann Garrison	Canton					
1957	Kathryn Gabriel	Cleveland	20		4th runner-up (Note: Finished in 6th place and later awarded 4th runner-up after disqualification of Leona Gage)		
1956	Eleanor Wood	Canton	18		Semi-finalist		
1955	Carol Hagerman	Columbus					
1954	Barbara Joyce Randa	Painesville	19		Semi-finalist		
1953	Eleanore Mack	Bellaire	20		Semi-finalist		
1952	Margie Broering	Cincinnati					
