= Moving Violations =

1985 film by Neal Israel

- Theatrical release poster
- Directed by: Neal Israel
- Screenplay by: Neal Israel; Pat Proft
- Story by: Paul Boorstin; Sharon Boorstin
- Produced by: Joe Roth; Harry J. Ufland
- Starring: John Murray; Jennifer Tilly; James Keach; Wendie Jo Sperber; Sally Kellerman
- Cinematography: Robert Elswit
- Edited by: Tom Walls
- Music by: Ralph Burns
- Production company: SLM Production Group
- Distributed by: 20th Century Fox
- Release date: April 19, 1985
- Running time: 90 minutes
- Country: United States
- Language: English
- Box office: $10.6 million (USA)

Moving Violations is a 1985 American comedy film based around a traffic school. Directed by Neal Israel, the film stars John Murray, Jennifer Tilly, Brian Backer, Sally Kellerman, Nedra Volz, Clara Peller, Wendie Jo Sperber, Fred Willard, and Don Cheadle (in his film debut.)

== Plot ==
The film follows a group of people in Birch County, California (a fictionalized city-county that is similar to real-life Los Angeles) who, after being ticketed for numerous traffic violations (and hence losing their drivers' licenses, and vehicles to impounding), are ordered by Judge Nedra Henderson (Sally Kellerman) to attend a driving course to get their licenses and their vehicles back. However, the assigned teacher for this course, Deputy Henry "Hank" Halik (James Keach), is conspiring with the judge to execute a plan to ensure these offenders fail miserably, at all costs, so the corrupt duo can sell their impounded vehicles for their own personal gain. Clues lead one of the traffic offenders, landscaper Dana Cannon (John Murray), to discover their scheme, and he enlists his fellow students to help him stop it.

== Cast ==
- John Murray as Dana Cannon
- Jennifer Tilly as Amy Hopkins
- James Keach as Deputy Henry "Hank" Halik
- Brian Backer as Scott Greeber
- Sally Kellerman as Judge Nedra Henderson
- Ned Eisenberg as "Wink" Barnes
- Clara Peller as Emma Jean
- Wendie Jo Sperber as Joan Pudillo
- Nedra Volz as Mrs. Loretta Houk
- Fred Willard as Terrence "Doc" Williams
- Lisa Hart Carroll as Deputy Virginia Morris
- Nadine van der Velde as Stephanie McCarty
- Ben Mittleman as Spencer Popodophalos
- Don Cheadle as Juicy Burgers Worker
- William Forward as Police Officer #1
- Casey Sander as Cop With Joan
- Robert Conrad as Chief Robert A. Fromm (uncredited)
- Willard E. Pugh as Jeff Roth
- Dedee Pfeiffer as Cissy
- Michael McManus as Farmer #1 (credited as Mike McManus)
- Jophery Brown as Baggage-Van (uncredited)

== Production ==
Writer and director Israel himself attended traffic school after having been pulled over by a police officer, for doing an illegal U turn:

"I made the mistake of arguing, and that was very foolish because the cop called in and found I had 13 tickets outstanding. Plus, I had one moving violation that I'd never settled. I went right to jail and did not collect $200. They put me in a cell with an arsonist. He had just blown somebody up. It was a very unsettling experience. I went to traffic school for a very long time, and I had to go to a whole lot of different courts with different jurisdictions. It was a real hassle. So, I suggested the idea of the film to Joe Roth, our producer, and he had just been to traffic school, too, so he thought it was great."

However he says "Traffic school is boring ... I interviewed a lot of people, including a man who owned a traffic school, but all his stories were boring. So, we made up everything."

Robert Conrad appeared in the film, uncredited, as a favor to Pat Proft, who was an old friend.

== Reception ==
The film was reviewed poorly by Janet Maslin at The New York Times, who described it as an "especially weak teen-age comedy, even by today's none-too-high standards." In a later appraisal, David Nusair of Reelfilm.com wrote that Moving Violations contains "enough laughs to be had here to warrant a mild recommendation."

== See also ==
- List of American films of 1985
