= Brian Matthews (actor) =

American actor (born 1953)

- Born: 1953 (age 72–73); U.S.
- Occupations: Actor, therapist
- Years active: 1981–1990 (Actor); 1994–present (Therapist)
- Spouse: Leslee
- Children: 5

Brian Matthews (born 1953) is an American actor, best known for acting in daytime soap operas in the 1980s.

Matthews and co-stars Holly Hunter, Jason Alexander, and Fisher Stevens all made their film debuts in The Burning (1981). That same year, he portrayed the Adult David in the 1981 Broadway musical Copperfield, which flopped. He then played Eric Garrison on the soap opera The Young and the Restless from 1983–1985. He went on to portray Brother Francis on Days of Our Lives from 1985–1986 and David Laurent on Santa Barbara in 1986. Then, he guest-starred in television shows such as Murder, She Wrote and acted in television movies before quitting acting. He then became a therapist and lives with his wife Leslee with whom he has five children.

He ran for Texas's 25th congressional district in the 2012 election; he placed seventh in the Republican primary with 1,824 votes (3.6%).
