= Brian Backer =

American actor

- Born: December 5, 1956 (age 69); New York City, U.S.
- Occupation: Actor
- Years active: 1980–2012

Brian Backer (born December 5, 1956) is an American former actor who has starred in film and on television. He is best known for his role in the 1982 hit comedy film Fast Times at Ridgemont High as shy teenager Mark "Rat" Ratner. He appeared in the 1985 comedy film Moving Violations as Scott Greeber and the 1987 comedy film Police Academy 4: Citizens on Patrol as Arnie.

Backer's primary television role was on the soap opera Santa Barbara in 1990 as A. Bartlett Congdon. He has made guest appearances on such shows as Charles in Charge, Gimme a Break! and Growing Pains.

Backer won the 1981 Tony Award for Best Featured Actor in a Play, and the Drama Desk Award in the same category as well as the Theatre World Award for Woody Allen's The Floating Light Bulb, in which he portrayed an Allen-like protagonist.

== Early life ==
Backer grew up in Brooklyn. He is Jewish.

== Filmography ==
- The Burning (1981) as Alfred
- Fast Times at Ridgemont High (1982) as Mark "Rat" Ratner
- Talk to Me (1984) as Men's Store Salesman
- Moving Violations (1985) as Scott Greeber
- The Money Pit (1986) as Ethan
- Gimme a Break! (1986) as Tyler (episode: The Purse Snatcher)
- Police Academy 4: Citizens on Patrol (1987) as Arnie
- Perry Mason: The Case of the Lethal Lesson (1989) as Eugene
- Steel and Lace (1991) as Norman
- A Clown in Babylon (1999) as Blake
- Loser (2000) as Doctor
- Marie and Bruce (2004) as Waiter
- Vamps (2012) as Middle-Aged Guy/Dentist
