= Carolyn Houlihan =

American actress and beauty pageant contestant

- Occupation: Actress
- Years active: 1981–1982 (film)

Carolyn Houlihan is an American former actor and beauty pageant contestant. In 1979, she won the Miss Ohio USA title and competed in Miss USA. Houlihan rose to prominence for her role as Karen in the cult horror film The Burning (1981), where she shares a scene with Jason Alexander and is the first victim. After a brief appearance in the comedy A Little Sex (1982), Houlihan ceased acting and show business.

== Filmography ==
Title	Year	Role
The Burning	1981	Karen
A Little Sex	1982	Bathing suit model
