= Kim Seelbrede =

American model

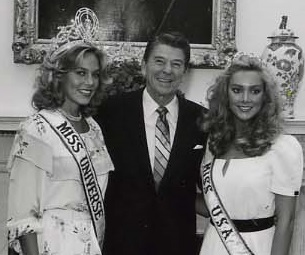
- Shawn Weatherly, Ronald Reagan and Kim Seelbrede in Oval Office in 1981
- Born: Kimberly Seelbrede; Germantown, Ohio, U.S.
- Spouse(s): Neil Cole (1985–2001), John Chambers Christopher, Ph.D (2018–present)
- Children: 2
- Beauty pageant titleholder
- Title: Miss Ohio USA 1981; Miss USA 1981
- Hair color: Blonde
- Eye color: Hazel
- Major competitions: Miss USA 1981 (Winner); Miss Universe 1981 (Top 12)

Kimberly Seelbrede is an American model and beauty pageant titleholder who held the title Miss USA 1981. Seelbrede is a licensed psychotherapist in the states of New York and New Mexico. Seelbrede holds a graduate degree from New York University. Following the pageant, Seelbrede embarked on a career in television, commercials and print modeling.

== Biography ==
Seelbrede, who hails from Germantown, Ohio won the Miss Ohio USA pageant in late 1980. She represented her state at the nationally televised 1981 Miss USA pageant that was held in Biloxi, Mississippi in May 1981, where she became the second woman from Ohio to win the Miss USA title.

Seelbrede later competed at the Miss Universe pageant held in New York City in July 1981. Her national costume was a cowgirl. Seelbrede placed in the semi-finals at the pageant, which was won by Irene Saez of Venezuela.
