= Ingrid Bethke =

German model and beauty queen

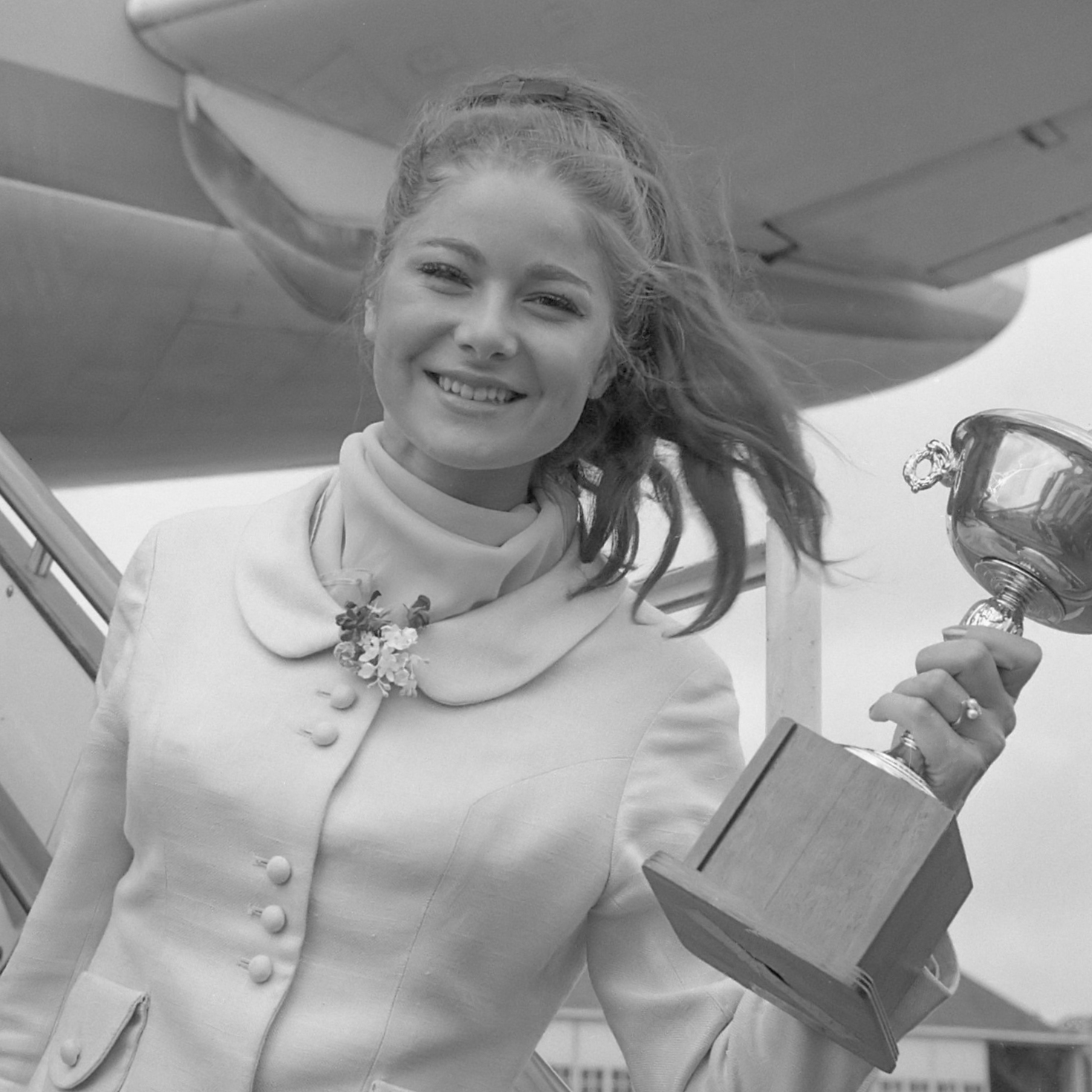
- Born: 14 December 1941 (age 84); Berlin, Germany
- Occupation: Model
- Years active: 1968–1971 (film)

Ingrid Bethke (born 1941) is a German former actress, model and beauty pageant titleholder. Elected Miss Germany 1965 she went on to represent the country at the Miss Universe 1965 where she was awarded Miss Congeniality. She also appeared in two films Street Acquaintances of St. Pauli (1968) and The Body in the Thames (1971).

== Bibliography ==
- Peter Cowie. World Filmography, 1968. Tantivy Press, 1977.
