= Miss USA 1981 =

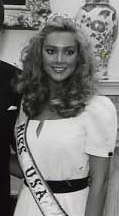
- Kim Seelbrede, Miss USA 1981
- Date: May 21, 1981
- Presenters: Bob Barker
- Venue: Gulf Coast Convention Center, Biloxi, Mississippi
- Broadcaster: CBS
- Entrants: 50
- Placements: 12
- Winner: Kim Seelbrede; Ohio
- Congeniality: Cynthia Kerby; California
- Photogenic: Cynthia Kerby; California

Miss USA 1981 was the 30th Miss USA pageant, held at the Gulf Coast Convention Center in Biloxi, Mississippi on May 21, 1981.

At the end of the event, Jineane Ford of Arizona crowned Kim Seelbrede of Ohio as Miss USA 1981. It is the second victory of Ohio in the pageant's history. Seelbrede later competed at Miss Universe and was named one of the twelve semi-finalists.

This year also marked the first year since 1957 that a runner-up of Miss USA was sent to Miss World. Holli Dennis, the first runner-up from Indiana, was supposed to compete at Miss World, but chose to marry instead. Due to this, Lisa Moss, the second runner-up from Louisiana, was appointed as the representative of the United States to Miss World. Moss later competed at Miss World and was named one of the seven finalists.

Contestants from forty-nine states and the District of Columbia competed in the pageant. The competition was hosted by Bob Barker.

== Results ==
=== Placements ===
Placement	Contestant
Miss USA 1981	Ohio – Kim Seelbrede
1st runner-up	Indiana – Holli Dennis
2nd runner-up	Louisiana – Lisa Moss
3rd runner-up	California – Cynthia Kerby
4th runner-up	Hawaii – Teri Ann Linn
Top 12	Alabama – JoAnne Henderson; Arizona – Cassie Hill; Georgia – Lisa Condrey; Maryland – Linda Lambert; Tennessee – Sharon Kay Steakley; Texas – Diana Durnford; Virginia – Pam Hutchens

== Pageant ==
=== Format ===
Same with 1971, twelve semi-finalists were chosen through the preliminary competition— composed of the swimsuit and evening gown competitions and closed-door interviews. The twelve semi-finalists competed in the evening gown and swimsuit competitions and were narrowed down to five afterward. The five finalists competed in the question and answer round and the final look.

=== Selection committee ===
==== Final telecast ====
- Cindy Adams – American gossip columnist and writer
- Joey Adams – American comedian and author
- John Mack Carter – American women's magazine editor
- Dwight Clark – American professional football player
- Wesley Eure – American singer, actor, and producer
- Jim Fowler – American zoologist and host of television show Mutual of Omaha's Wild Kingdom
- Mary Therese Friel – Miss USA 1979 from New York
- Gary Graffman – American pianist
- Patrice Munsel – American opera singer
- Freda Payne – American singer and actress
- Phil Roura – Editor at the New York Daily News

== Contestants ==
Fifty contestants competed for the title.

State	Contestant	Age (Note: Ages at the time of the pageant.)	Hometown	Notes
Alabama	JoAnne Henderson	21	Tuscaloosa	
Alaska	Shelly Brunaugh	18	Fairbanks	
Arizona	Cassie Hill	23	Phoenix	
Arkansas	Lynnanne Derryberry	18	Jerusalem	
California	Cynthia Kerby	18	Westlake Village	
Colorado	Shannon Davidson	19	Boulder	
Connecticut	Kelly Thompson	20	Monroe	
Delaware	Natalie Diane Ramsey	21	Wilmington	
District of Columbia	Belinda Johnson	23	Martinsville, Virginia	
Florida	Valerie Lundeen	24	Miami	Married to "Tarzan" actor Ron Ely, murdered by their son Cameron Ely at their Southern California home on October 15, 2019
Georgia	Lisa Joyce Condrey	20	Decatur	
Hawaii	Teri Ann Linn	20	Honolulu	Later became an actress, starred in The Bold and the Beautiful
Idaho	Lori Ditch	21	Boise	
Illinois	Leslie K. Renfrow	21	Chicago	
Indiana	Holli Rene Dennis	21	Fort Wayne	Initially appointed as Miss World USA but chose to marry instead
Iowa	Jennifer Lynn Wimpey	19	Coralville	
Kansas	Missy Kaser	18	Wichita	
Kentucky	Denise Gibbs	20	Kevil	
Louisiana	Lisa Lynn Moss	23	Shreveport	Later Miss World USA 1981; Finalist at Miss World 1981
Maine	Judy Lynn Footer	24	Bath	
Maryland	Linda Lambert	22	Baltimore	
Massachusetts	Jo Ann Savery	22	Bridgewater	
Michigan	Karen Eidson	21	Hazel Park	
Minnesota	Polly Peterson	22	Edina	Sister of Miss USA 1976 Barbara Peterson
Mississippi	Angela Ashmore	20	Muscle Shoals, Alabama	
Missouri	Karyn Marie Smagacz	19	Fulton	
Montana	Cathi Jo Locati	19	Billings	
Nebraska	La Donna Hill	21	Seward	
Nevada	Mary Lebsock	23	Las Vegas	
New Hampshire	Cynthia Lee Graves	21	North Conway	
New Jersey	Christy Garthwaite	19	Tuckerton	
New Mexico	Lise Gabrielle Dominique Thevenet	23	Las Cruces	
New York	Deborah Ann Fountain	25	Bronx	Previously Miss North Carolina World 1979; Finalist at Miss World America 1979; Disqualified after wearing a padded bra in the swimsuit competition
North Carolina	Lisa Colleen Swift	22	Southport	
North Dakota	Laurie Saarinen	20	Jamestown	Later Miss Minnesota 1982
Ohio	Kimberly Seelbrede	20	Germantown	Semi-finalist at Miss Universe 1981
Oklahoma	Stacey Loach	17	Oklahoma City	
Oregon	Dawn Michele Lewis	22	Portland	
Pennsylvania	Nena Stone	21	Bethel Park	
Rhode Island	Patti Reo	20	Cranston	
South Carolina	Zade Denise Turner	21	Myrtle Beach	
South Dakota	Joan Abbott	19	Irene	
Tennessee	Sharon Kay Steakley	24	Winchester	Mother of Alexandra Harper, Miss Tennessee USA 2018
Texas	Diana Durnford	22	El Paso	
Utah	Tonya Anderson	20	Orem	
Vermont	Jeannette Wulff	21	Middlesex	
Virginia	Pam Hutchens	22	Newport News	General District Court Judge in Virginia Beach, Virginia
Washington	Leila Wagner	20	Seattle	
West Virginia	Kelly Carr	19	Scherr	
Wisconsin	Dawn Marie Spreeman	18	Kaukauna	
Wyoming	Deborah Aspinwall	23	Riverton	
