= The Floating Light Bulb =

- Cover of the Random House first edition published March 12, 1982
- Original language: English
- Written by: Woody Allen
- Genre: Drama
- Setting: Canarsie, Brooklyn, 1945

Premiere
- Date: April 27, 1981
- Place: Vivian Beaumont Theater; New York City

The Floating Light Bulb is a 1981 Broadway play by Woody Allen. Semi-autobiographical, it focuses on a lower middle class family living in Canarsie, Brooklyn, New York City, in 1945.

== Plot ==
Matriarch Enid Pollack, who once aspired to be a dancer in George White's Scandals, spends her days hounding neighbors with telephone business schemes in order to support the family. Her philandering husband Max is a gambler, furtively planning his escape from his marriage. Stuttering teenaged son Paul is a frail, bright, shy boy who tries to perfect magic tricks — including a floating light bulb illusion — in his bedroom.

When talent agent Jerry Wexler arrives at the house, seemingly to audition Paul, Enid seizes the opportunity for Paul to shine in the spotlight that eluded her, only to have her hopes dashed when she realizes Wexler is more interested in wooing her than signing her son as a client.

== Production ==
The play premiered on Broadway at the Vivian Beaumont Theater in Lincoln Center on April 27, 1981 and ran for 62 performances and 16 previews. Directed by Ulu Grosbard, the cast included Beatrice Arthur as Enid, Danny Aiello as Max, Brian Backer as Paul, and Jack Weston as Jerry. The Magic Director was Robert Aberdeen who was responsible for the title effect, the floating lightbulb, and taught all the magic to Brian Backer who won the Tony Award for his performance.

== Cast ==
- Beatrice Arthur as Enid
- Danny Aiello as Max
- Brian Backer as Paul
- Jack Weston as Jerry

== Critical reception ==
In his review in The New York Times, Frank Rich called the play a "conventional, modest and at times pedestrian family drama" and "nothing to be embarrassed about" although "it could easily be mistaken for a journeyman effort by a much younger and less experienced writer." He added, "There are a few laughs, a few well-wrought characters, and, in Act II, a beautifully written scene that leads to a moving final curtain. But most of the time Light Bulb is superficial and only mildly involving. As a serious playwright, Mr. Allen is still learning his craft and finding his voice. Like so many young American plays, this one is overly beholden to the early Tennessee Williams."

== Awards ==
=== Tony Awards ===
The Tony Award is presented by the American Theatre Wing and The Broadway League. Considered the highest honor in US theatre.

Year	Category	Nominee	Result	Notes
1981	Best Actor in a Play	Jack Weston	Nominated	
1981	Best Featured Actor in a Play	Brian Backer	Won	
