= The Body in the Thames =

1971 film by Harald Philipp

- Directed by: Harald Philipp
- Written by: Edgar Wallace (story); Horst Wendlandt; Harald Philipp
- Produced by: Preben Philipsen; Horst Wendlandt
- Starring: Uschi Glas; Hansjörg Felmy; Werner Peters
- Cinematography: Karl Löb
- Edited by: Alfred Srp
- Music by: Peter Thomas
- Production company: Rialto Film
- Distributed by: Constantin Film
- Release date: 31 March 1971
- Running time: 89 minutes
- Country: West Germany
- Language: German

The Body in the Thames (German: Die Tote aus der Themse) is a 1971 West German thriller film directed by Harald Philipp and starring Uschi Glas, Hansjörg Felmy and Werner Peters. It is part of the series of Edgar Wallace adaptations made by Rialto Film. It was the last shot in Germany, with two Italian films following before the end of the series.

The film's sets were designed by the art director Johannes Ott. It was shot on location in London and Berlin.

== Synopsis ==
After her sister is murdered by a drug gang, Australian Danny Fergusson arrives in London to find out what happened.

== Cast ==
- Uschi Glas as Danny Fergusson
- Hansjörg Felmy as Inspector Craig
- Werner Peters as William Baxter
- Harry Riebauer as Milton S. Farnborough
- Vadim Glowna as David Armstrong
- Siegfried Schürenberg as Sir John
- Günther Stoll as Doctor Ellis
- Petra Schürmann as Susan
- Friedrich Schoenfelder as Anthony Wyman
- Lyvia Bauer as Myrna Fergusson
- Peter Neusser as Sergeant Simpson
- Friedrich G. Beckhaus as Brothel Owner (German: Bordellbesitzer)
- Michael Miller as Jim Donovan
- Gerd Frickhöffer as Pennymaker
- Ingrid Steeger as Kitty
- Brigitte Skay as Maggy McConnor
- Ivan Desny as Louis Stout
- Ingrid Bethke as Saleswoman

== Bibliography ==
- Bergfelder, Tim. International Adventures: German Popular Cinema and European Co-Productions in the 1960s. Berghahn Books, 2005.
