= Audrey Bolte =

American beauty pageant titleholder

- Born: Audrey Claire Bolte; April 5, 1989 (age 37); Batavia, Ohio, U.S.
- Education: St. Andrews Presbyterian College (BBA)
- Height: 1.78 m (5 ft 10 in)
- Beauty pageant titleholder
- Title: Miss Batavia USA 2012; Miss Ohio USA 2012
- Hair color: Blonde
- Eye color: Brown
- Major competitions: Miss Ohio USA 2012 (Winner); Miss USA 2012 (2nd Runner-Up)

Audrey Claire Bolte (born April 5, 1989) is an American beauty pageant titleholder from Batavia, Ohio. She was crowned Miss Ohio USA 2012 and competed in the Miss USA 2012 pageant where she was named second runner-up. She had never competed in a beauty pageant before becoming Miss Batavia 2012 and then Miss Ohio USA.

== Early life ==
Bolte was born in 1989 to Bill Bolte and Shelly Bolte. She grew up as an only child in Batavia, Ohio. She graduated from Batavia High School in 2007, and went on to attend St. Andrews Presbyterian College in North Carolina. She graduated in 2011 with a degree in business administration and a minor in equine science. While at St. Andrews, Bolte competed on the school's equestrian team. Bolte claims her mother encouraged her to participate in the Miss Ohio USA pageant. She had never competed in a beauty pageant prior to becoming Miss Batavia USA 2012 and then Miss Ohio USA 2012.

== Pageant answer ==
Bolte received international and sustained press coverage for her response to the question "Do you think women are depicted in movies and on television in an accurate and positive way? And please give us an example.” She answered by naming a prostitute as a positive role model: "I think there are some movies that depict women in a very positive role, and then some movies that put them in a little bit more of a negative role. But by the end of the movie, they show that woman-power that I know we all have. Such as the movie Pretty Woman. We had a wonderful, beautiful woman, Julia Roberts, and she was having a rough time, but, you know what? She came out on top and she didn’t let anybody stand in her path."

In a follow-up interview, Bolte maintained that she stood by her answer, claiming that "I feel very confident in the way I answered it. I felt I had 30 seconds on live TV and I felt I answered it the best I could at that moment... For the record, I do not feel that prostitutes are role models. That was not the question. Those words were not ever "out of my mouth."

== Murder trial testimony ==
In April 2015, Bolte testified in the trial of Shayna Hubers, who was charged with the murder of Ryan Poston. On October 12, 2012, the night of Poston's murder, she and Poston were scheduled to go on a date at a bar in Milford, Ohio. Bolte testified that she and Poston were supposed to meet at the bar at 9:30 that night, and that she was looking forward to it, but Poston never showed up. Hubers was ultimately convicted of Poston's murder and sentenced to life in prison.

Awards and achievements
Preceded by (Alabama) Madeline Mitchell	Miss USA 2nd Runner-Up; 2012	Succeeded by (Illinois) Stacie Juris
Preceded by Ashley Caldwell	Miss Ohio USA; 2012	Succeeded by Kristin Smith
