= Rainer Brandt =

German actor (1936–2024)

- Born: 19 January 1936; Berlin, Germany
- Died: 1 August 2024 (aged 88)
- Occupations: Actor, Dubbing director, Dubbing writer
- Years active: 1954–2024

Rainer Brandt (19 January 1936 – 1 August 2024) was a German actor, dubbing director and dubbing writer. He appeared in 40 films between 1959 and 1986, but is arguably most well known for his work in German dubbing. He was born in Berlin, Germany. Brandt died on 1 August 2024, at the age of 88.

== Selected filmography ==
Actor

- The Red Hand (1960)
- The Juvenile Judge (1960) as Kurt
- Horrors of Spider Island (1960) as Bobby
- The Avenger (1960) as Reggie Conolly
- Carnival Confession (1960) as Ferdinand Bäumler
- Das Riesenrad (1961) as Lothar Höpfner
- Aurora Marriage Bureau (1962) as Friedrich
- Genosse Münchhausen (1962) as Berthold
- Die Rechnung – eiskalt serviert (1966) as Stanley
- Funeral in Berlin (1966) as Benjamin
- The Hound of Blackwood Castle (1968)
- Street Acquaintances of St. Pauli (1968)

German dubbing/voice acting

- The Indian Scarf (1963) as Voice on the telephone
- The Last Ride to Santa Cruz (1964) as Pedro Ortiz (played by Mario Adorf)
- The Persuaders! (1971, TV series) as Danny Wilde (played by Tony Curtis)
