= Street Acquaintances of St. Pauli =

- Directed by: Werner Klingler
- Written by: Jürgen Büchmann; Jürgen Knop
- Produced by: Artur Brauner; Günter Schlesinger
- Starring: Günther Stoll; Rainer Brandt; Dagmar Lassander
- Cinematography: Günther Knuth; Klaus J. Merl
- Edited by: Ursula Kahlbaum
- Music by: Wolf Hartmeier
- Production company: Tele-Cine Film- und Fernsehproduktion
- Distributed by: Alpha Film
- Release date: 29 February 1968
- Running time: 82 minutes
- Country: West Germany
- Language: German

Street Acquaintances of St. Pauli (German: Straßenbekanntschaften auf St. Pauli) is a 1968 West German crime drama film directed by Werner Klingler and starring Günther Stoll, Rainer Brandt and Dagmar Lassander.

It was shot at the Wandsbek Studios in Hamburg and on location around St. Pauli.

== Synopsis ==
A nightclub owner who runs a major prostitution ring in the red light district of Hamburg kidnaps the daughter of an official in order to get him to stop investigating his business.

== Cast ==
- Günther Stoll as Inspector Torber
- Rainer Brandt as Ingo Werner
- Suse Wohl as Susanne Petersen
- Sibille Gilles as Renate Petersen
- Dagmar Lassander as Gerti Weber
- Reinhard Kolldehoff as Radebach
- Jürgen Feindt as Jensen
- Gabriele Gutkind as Viola
- Manuela Bock as Ilona
- Mathias Grimm as Manfred
- Richard Haller as Oehrchen
- Charles Huttin as Hinkefuss
- Ingrid Bethke as Petra

== Bibliography ==
- Bock, Hans-Michael & Bergfelder, Tim. The Concise CineGraph. Encyclopedia of German Cinema. Berghahn Books, 2009.
