= Günther Stoll =

German actor

- Born: August 18, 1924; Duisburg, Germany
- Died: January 10, 1977 (aged 52); Gelsenkirchen, West Germany
- Occupation: Actor

Günther Stoll (Duisburg, 18 August 1924 – Gelsenkirchen, 10 January 1977) was a German actor.

== Partial filmography ==
- Liebe, wie die Frau sie wünscht (1957) .... Toni
- Epitafios gia ehthrous kai filous (1965) .... Captain Ivanov
- Melissa (1966, TV miniseries) .... Guy Foster
- The Hunchback of Soho (1966) .... Inspektor Hopkins
- Maigret and His Greatest Case (1966) .... Alain Robin
- Date for a Murder (1967) .... Commissioner Silvio Giunta
- Street Acquaintances of St. Pauli (1968) .... Inspector Torber
- Beyond the Law (1968) .... Burtons Right Hand
- Van de Velde: Die vollkommene Ehe (1968) .... Gregor Bachmann
- God's Police Patrol (1968) .... Kaplan Wolf
- The Last Mercenary (1968) .... Man in Black
- Mattanza – ein Liebestraum (1969) .... Krämer alias Dr. Randolf
- The Castle of Fu Manchu (1969) .... Dr. Curt Kessler
- Double Face (1969) .... Inspector Stevens
- The Priest of St. Pauli (1970) .... Heino Docke
- The Body in the Thames (1971) .... Doctor Ellis
- Return of Sabata (1971) .... Circus Show Man
- The Bloodstained Butterfly (1971) .... Attorney Giulio Cordaro
- What Have You Done to Solange? (1972) .... Professor Bascombe
- Cold Blood (1975) .... Stazi
- Derrick (1975–1977, TV series) .... Schröder / Kriminalbeamter Schröder
- The Hook (1976) .... Kostas Maras
