= Miss Universe 1965 =

14th Miss Universe pageant

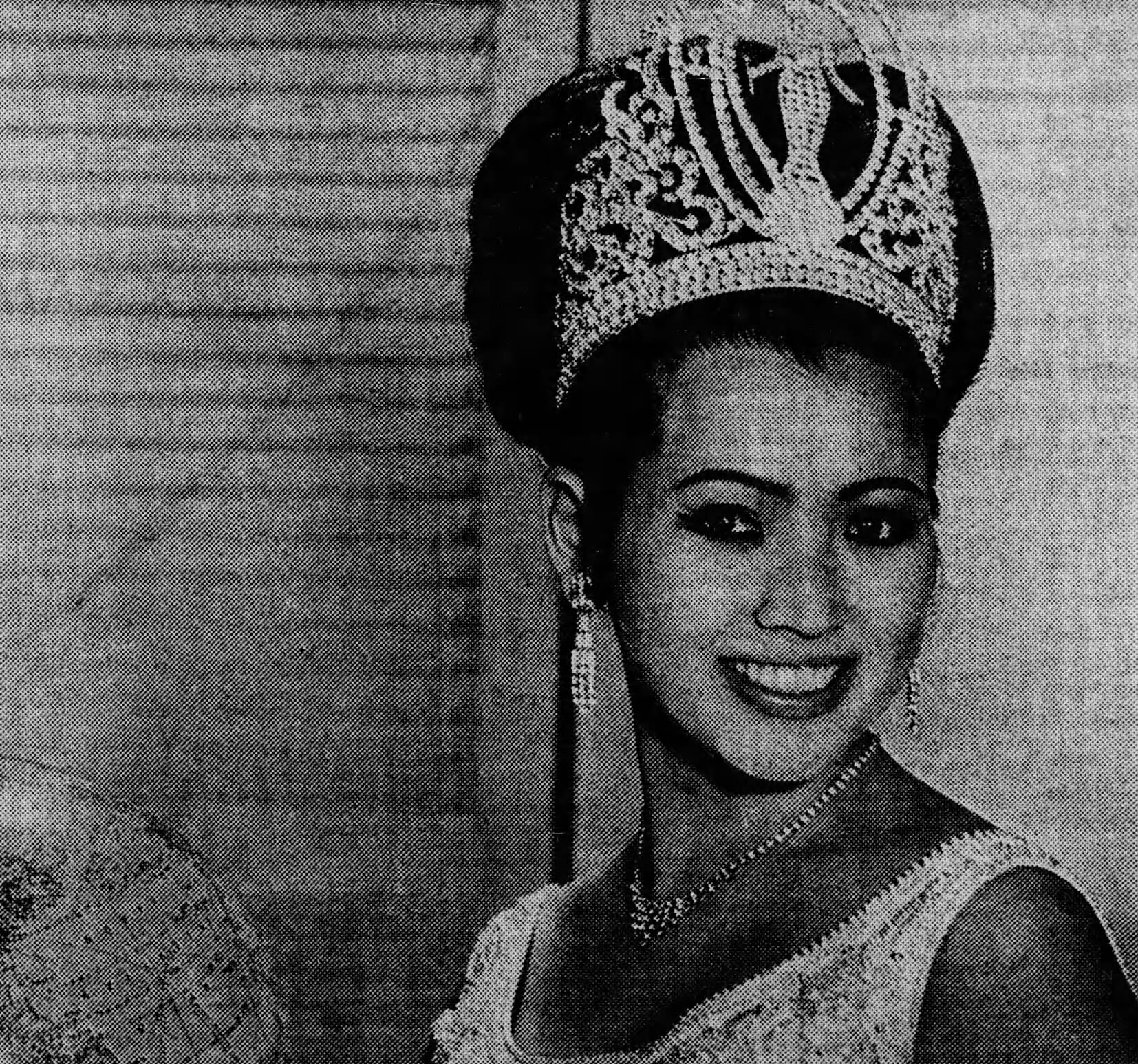
- Apasra Hongsakula
- Date: 24 July 1965
- Presenters: Jack Linkletter; John Daly; Sally Howes
- Venue: Miami Beach Auditorium, Miami Beach, Florida, United States
- Broadcaster: CBS
- Entrants: 56
- Placements: 15
- Debuts: Bermuda
- Withdrawals: Argentina; Chile; Dominican Republic; Grenada; Nigeria; Republic of China; Saint Vincent; Suriname; Trinidad and Tobago
- Returns: Cuba; Mexico; Portugal; Thailand
- Winner: Apasra Hongsakula; Thailand
- Congeniality: Ingrid Bethke (West Germany)
- Best National Costume: Sue Downey (United States)
- Photogenic: Karin Schmidt (Austria)

Miss Universe 1965 was the 14th Miss Universe pageant, held at the Miami Beach Auditorium in Miami Beach, Florida, on 24 July 1965.

At the conclusion of the event, Corinna Tsopei of Greece crowned Apasra Hongsakula of Thailand as Miss Universe 1965. It is the first victory of Thailand in the history of the pageant.

Contestants from fifty-six countries and territories competed in this edition. The pageant was hosted by Jack Linkletter, while Sally Howes and John Daly served as backstage correspondents.

== Background ==
=== Location and date ===
The Miss Universe Inc. announced that instead of holding the Miss USA and Miss Universe pageants back-to-back, there would be a seven-week gap between the two competitions. The Miss USA pageant would be held on June 4, while the Miss Universe pageant would be held on July 24. Although the two competitions would have separate productions, both competitions would still be held at the Miami Beach Auditorium in Miami Beach, Florida.

=== Selection of participants ===
Contestants from fifty-six countries and territories were selected to compete in the pageant. One candidate was appointed to represent her country to replace the original dethroned winner.

==== Replacements ====
Miss Turkey 1965, Zerrin Arbaş withdrew for unknown reasons and was replaced by Miss Turkey 1960, Nebahat Çehre.

==== Debuts, returns, and withdrawals ====
This edition saw the debut of Bermuda, and the returns of Mexico and Thailand, which last competed in 1959; Portugal in 1962; and Cuba in 1963.

Miss Argentina 1965, Mabel Azucena Caffarone, withdrew after having an intestinal infection. She was supposed to be replaced by her first runner-up, Nelida Jukna, but was unable to compete as the preliminary competition was already finished. Miss Dominican Republic 1965, Clara Andrea Herrera, Miss Nigeria 1965, Anna Eboweime, and Miss Saint Vincent 1965, Betty Boyea, withdrew for undisclosed reasons. Chile, Grenada, the Republic of China, Suriname, and Trinidad and Tobago withdrew after their respective organizations failed to hold a national competition or appoint a delegate.

== Results ==
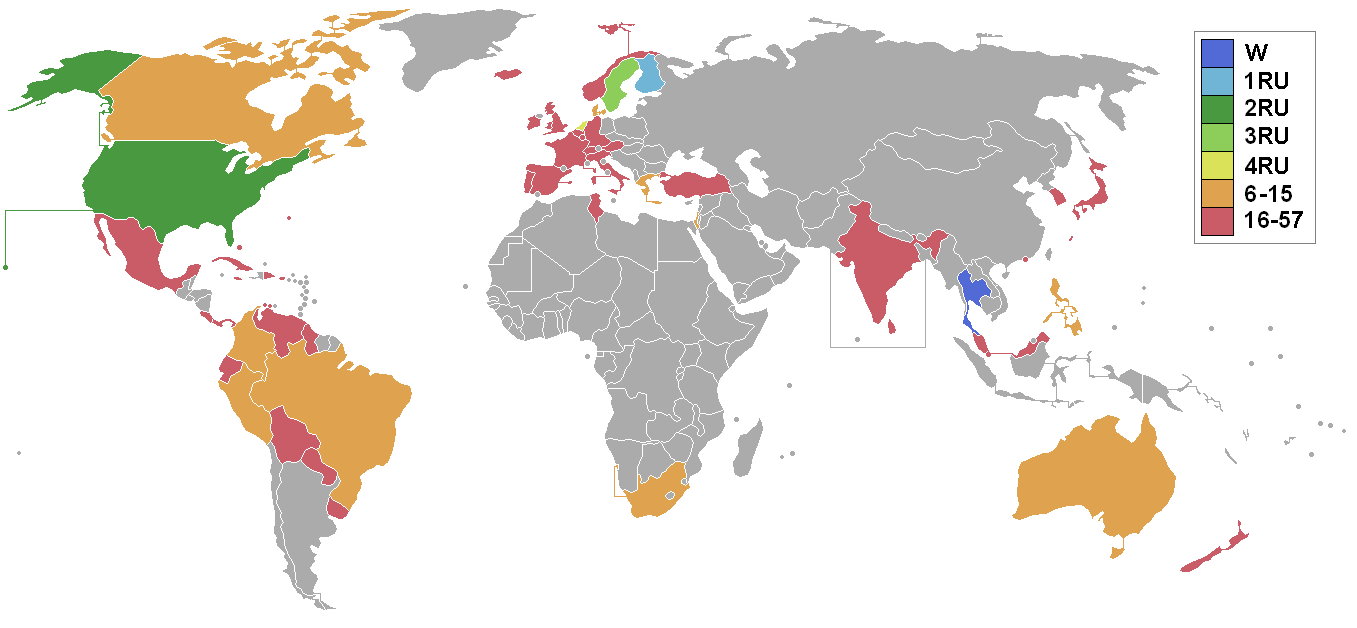
Miss Universe 1965 participating countries and territories.

=== Placements ===
Placement	Contestant
Miss Universe 1965	Thailand – Apasra Hongsakula
1st Runner-Up	Finland – Virpi Miettinen
2nd Runner-Up	United States – Sue Downey
3rd Runner-Up	Sweden – Ingrid Norman
4th Runner-Up	Holland – Anja Schuit
Top 15	Australia – Pauline Verey; Brazil – Maria Andrade; Canada – Carol Tidey; Colombia – María Victoria Ocampo; Denmark – Jeannette Christjansen; Greece – Aspa Theologitou; Israel – Aliza Sedeh; Peru – Frieda Holler; Philippines – Louise Vail; South Africa – Veronika Prigge

=== Special awards ===
Award	Contestant
Miss Photogenic	Austria – Karin Schmidt
Miss Congeniality	West Germany – Ingrid Bethke
Best National Costume	United States – Sue Downey

== Pageant ==
=== Format ===
Same with 1963, fifteen semi-finalists were chosen at the preliminary competition that consists of the swimsuit and evening gown competition. Each of the fifteen semi-finalists gave a short speech during the final telecast using their native languages. Afterwards, the fifteen semi-finalists paraded again in their swimsuits and evening gowns, and the five finalists were eventually chosen.

== Contestants ==
Fifty-six contestants competed for the title.

Country/Territory	Contestant	Age (Note: Ages at the time of the pageant)	Hometown
Aruba	Dorinda Croes	24	Oranjestad
Australia	Pauline Verey	19	Dandenong
Austria	Karin Schmidt	22	Linz
Bahamas	Janet Thompson	21	Nassau
Belgium	Lucy Nossent	21	Brussels
Bermuda	Elaine Simons	18	Hamilton
Bolivia	Patricia Estensoro	19	Tarija
Brazil	Maria Andrade	20	Rio de Janeiro
British Guiana	Cheryl Cheong	20	Georgetown
Canada	Carol Tidey	18	Ancaster
Ceylon	Shirlene De Silva	19	Colombo
Colombia	María Victoria Ocampo	18	Cartagena
Costa Rica	Mercedes Pinagel	18	Guanacaste
Cuba	Alina de Varona	18	Miami
Curaçao	Ninfa Palm	23	Willemstad
Denmark	Jeannette Christjansen	18	Copenhagen
Ecuador	Patricia Ballesteros	19	Quito
England	Jennifer Gurley	20	Cheshire
Finland	Virpi Miettinen	19	Helsinki
France	Marie-Thérèse Tullio	24	Paris
Greece	Aspa Theologitou	21	Athens
Holland	Anja Schuit	21	Amsterdam
Hong Kong	Joy Drake	21	Kowloon
Iceland	Bára Magnúsdóttir	18	Reykjavík
India	Persis Khambatta	18	Bombay
Ireland	Anne Elizabeth Neill	18	Belfast
Israel	Aliza Sadeh	18	Tel Aviv
Italy	Erika Jorger	23	Milan
Jamaica	Virginia Redpath	18	Runaway Bay
Japan	Mari Katayama	24	Tokyo
Luxembourg	Marie-Anne Geisen	18	Luxembourg City
Malaysia	Patricia Augustus	19	George Town
Mexico	Jeanine Acosta	18	Mexico City
New Zealand	Gay Phelps	20	Auckland
Norway	Britt Åberg	20	Oslo
Okinawa	Leiko Arakaki	18	Okinawa
Panama	Sonia Inés Ríos	18	Colón
Paraguay	Stella Castell	19	Asunción
Peru	Frieda Holler	20	Lima
Philippines	Louise Vail	18	Iloilo City
Portugal	Maria Sancho	20	Lisbon
Puerto Rico	Gloria Cobían	19	Caguas
Scotland	Mary Young	23	Bankend
South Africa	Veronika Prigge	23	Transvaal
South Korea	Eun-ji Kim	22	Seoul
Spain	Alicia Borrás	20	Barcelona
Sweden	Ingrid Norman	22	Tranås
Switzerland	Yvette Revelly	18	Glarus
Thailand	Apasra Hongsakula	18	Phra Nakhon
Tunisia	Dolly Allouche	19	Tunis
Turkey	Nebahat Çehre	21	Samsun
United States	Sue Downey	20	Columbus
Uruguay	Sonia Gorbarán	–	Montevideo
Venezuela	María de las Casas	22	Caracas
Wales	Joan Boull	18	Cardiff
West Germany	Ingrid Bethke	23	Berlin
