= Rehema Muthamia =

English beauty pageant titleholder (born 1996)

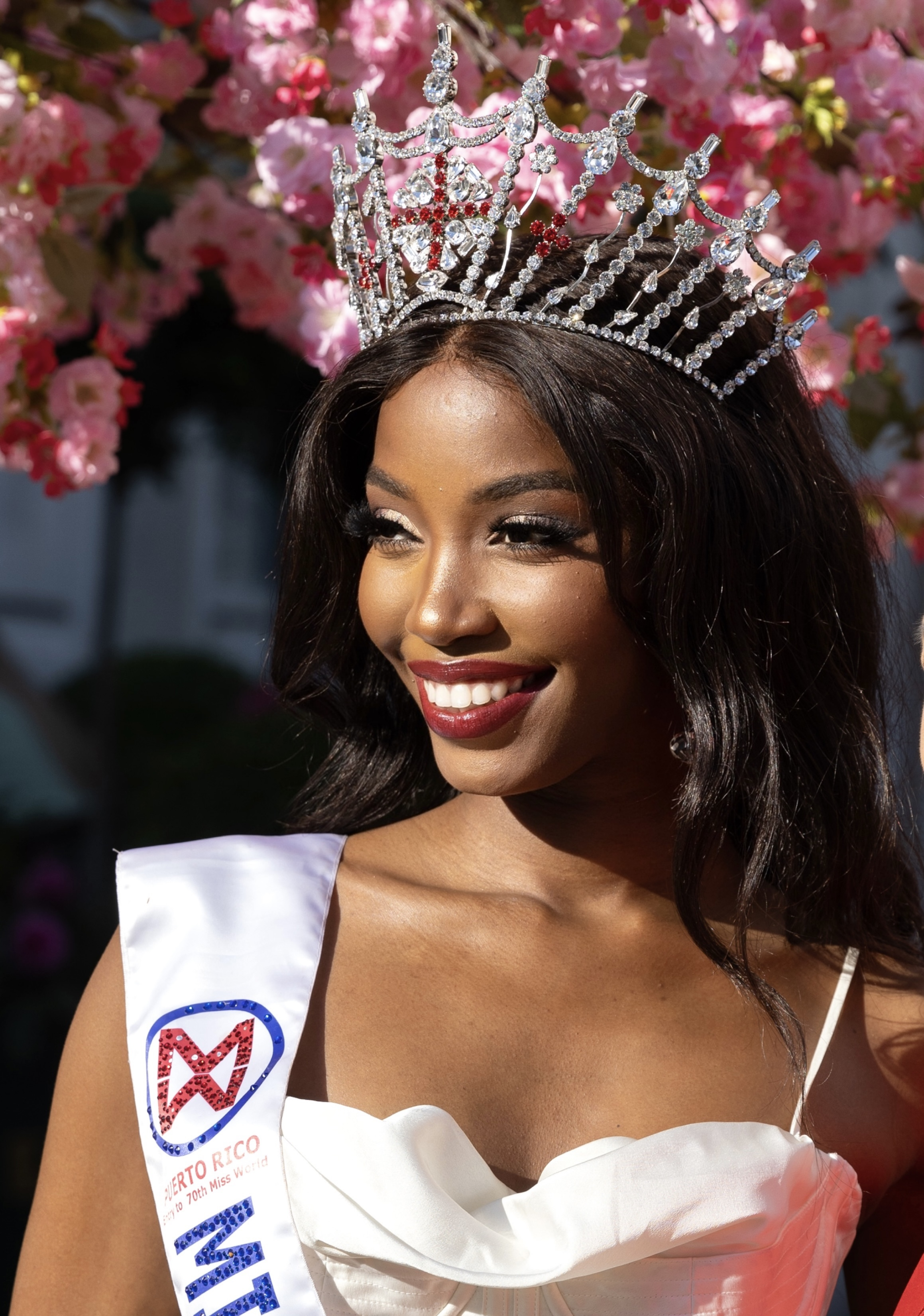
- Muthamia in 2022
- Born: London, England
- Beauty pageant titleholder
- Title: Miss England 2021
- Major competitions: Miss England 2021 (Winner); Miss World 2022 (Top 40) (Talent Top 27) (Beauty with A Purpose Winner); Miss Universe Great Britain 2024 (Top 5)

Rehema Muthamia is an English beauty pageant titleholder who was crowned Miss England 2021 and represented England at Miss World 2022. Muthamia won the Beauty with A Purpose round, placed Top 27 in the Talent round, and placed overall in the Top 40 at the Miss World final.

== Pageantry ==
=== Miss England 2021 ===
In August 2021, Muthamia was crowned Miss England 2021, following a unanimous decision from the pageant judges.

During the competition, Muthamia was nominated for the following awards:

- Top 3 - Bare Face Top Model
- Top 11 - Talent

=== Miss World 2021 ===
Muthamia represented England at the 70th Miss World competition held in Puerto Rico on 16 March 2021.

== Filmography ==
=== Television and Talk Show ===
Year	Title	Role	Production
2021	This Morning	Herself	ITV Studios
2023	Dinner Date (S12 E9)	Herself	ITV/Hat trick
2024	Her Majesty the Queen: Behind Closed Doors	Contributor	ITV

== See also ==
- Miss England
- Miss World 2021

Awards
Preceded by Bhasha Mukherjee	Miss England; 2021 - 2022	Succeeded by Jessica Gagen
