= Anna Leitch =

Northern Irish model and primary school teacher (born 1994)

- Born: 1994 (age 31–32); Cookstown, County Tyrone, Northern Ireland
- Occupations: Primary School Teacher; Model; Miss Northern Ireland
- Beauty pageant titleholder
- Title: Miss Northern Ireland 2021; Miss World Europe 2021
- Hair colour: Brown
- Eye colour: Blue
- Major competitions: Miss Northern Ireland 2021 (Winner); Miss World 2021 (Top 6) (Miss World Europe)

Anna Leitch (born 1994) is a Northern Irish primary school teacher, fashion model, and beauty pageant titleholder who was crowned Miss Northern Ireland 2021. She also represented her country at the Miss World 2021 pageant.

== Early life ==
Leitch was born in Cookstown, County Tyrone. She grew up in the same home that her father grew up. She cites her P7 teacher Miss Burnside as a huge influence. She moved to Lisburn to become more independent.

== Pageantry ==
=== Miss Northern Ireland 2021 ===
Anna Leitch began her pageant career by competing in the Miss Northern Ireland 2021 national pageant. At the end of the competition, Leitch was crowned Miss Northern Ireland 2021 by the outgoing titleholder Lauren Leckey, granting her the rights to represent Northern Ireland at the Miss World 2021 pageant.

=== Miss World 2021 ===
As Miss Northern Ireland 2021, Leitch represented her country at the Miss World 2021 pageant, held on March 16, 2022, at the Coca-Cola Music Hall in San Juan, Puerto Rico. At the conclusion of the pageant, Leitch placed among the Top 6 finalists, with Karolina Bielawska of Poland being crowned Miss World 2021. Leitch’s Top 6 placement marked Northern Ireland’s highest finish at Miss World to date. She also received the Miss World Europe title, awarded to the highest-placing delegate from the European region aside from the newly crowned winner.

Awards and achievements
Preceded by (England) Bhasha Mukherjee	Miss United Kingdom; 2022	Succeeded by (England) Jessica Gagen
Preceded by (France) Ophély Mézino	Miss World Europe; 2021	Succeeded by (England) Jessica Gagen
Preceded by Lauren Leckey	Miss World Northern Ireland; 2021	Succeeded by Kaitlyn Clarke
Preceded by Lauren Leckey	Miss Northern Ireland; 2021	Succeeded by Daria Gapska
