= Miss Saint Martin =

Miss Saint Martin may refer to two separate beauty pageants:

- Miss Saint Martin and Saint Barthélemy, a beauty pageant in the French overseas collectivity of Saint Martin
- Miss Sint Maarten, a beauty pageant in the Dutch constituent country of Sint Maarten
