= Achiote, Naranjito, Puerto Rico =

Barrio of Puerto Rico

Achiote
- Barrio
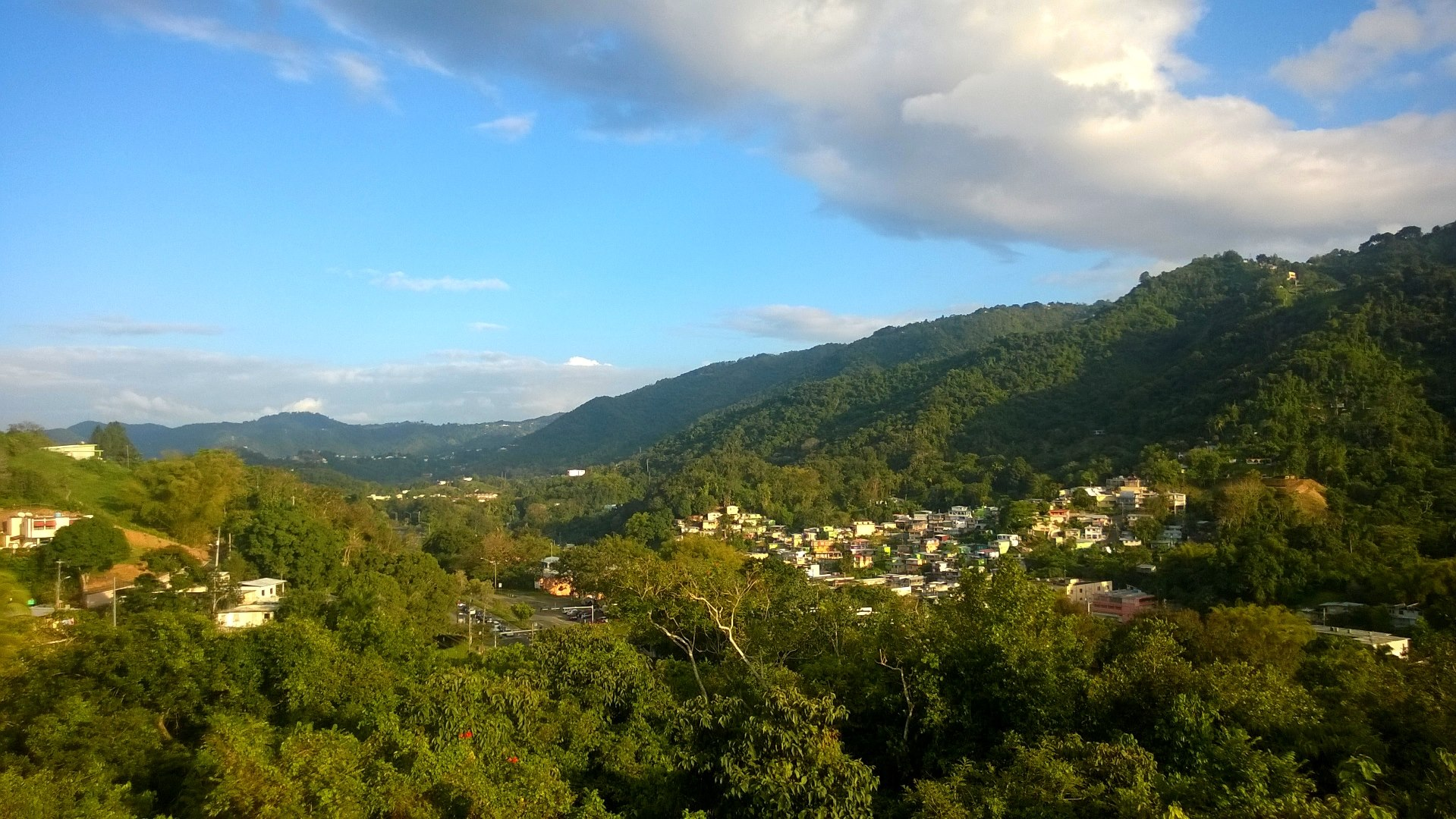
- View from Achiote

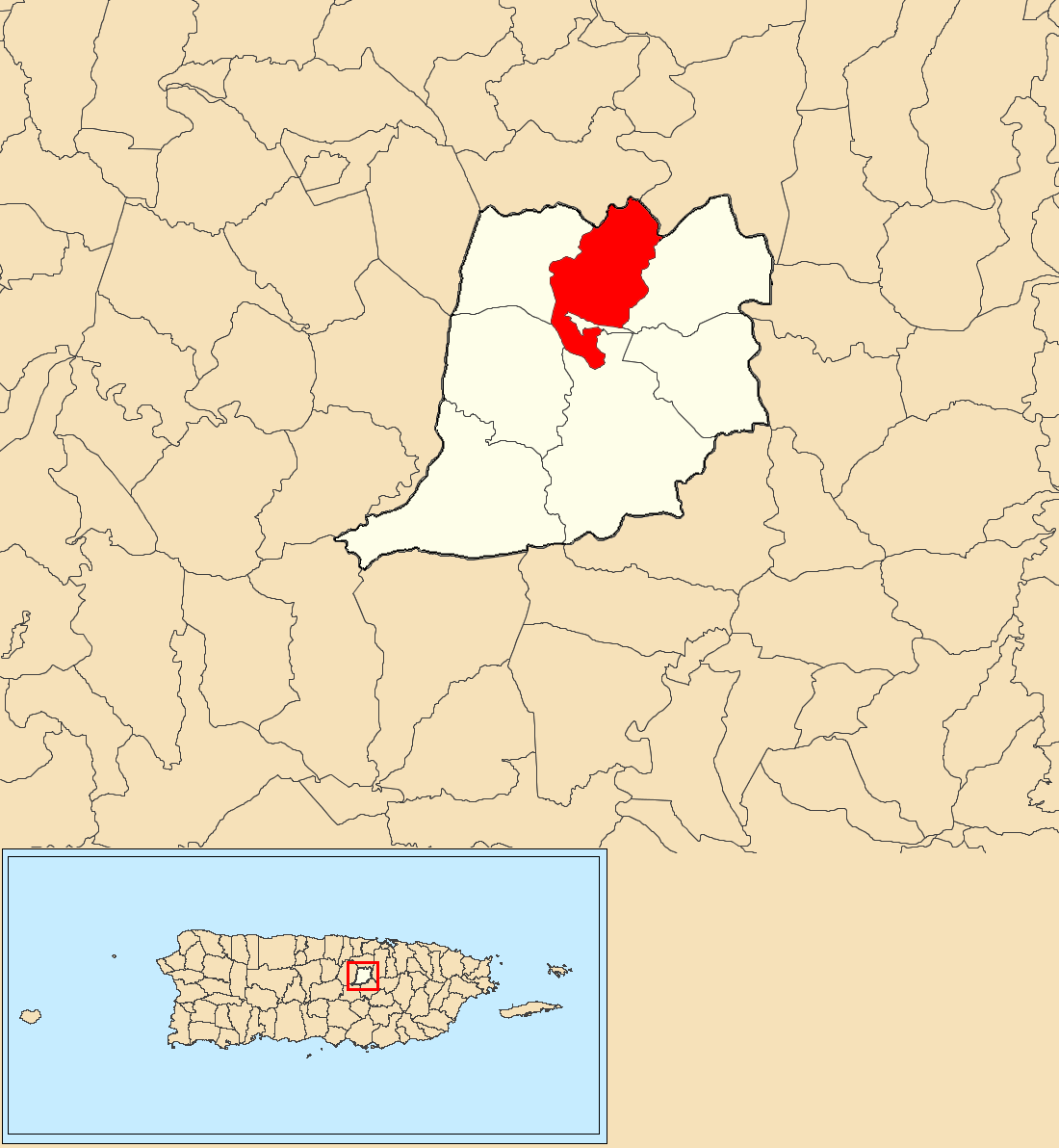
- Location of Achiote within the municipality of Naranjito shown in red

- Location of Puerto Rico
- Coordinates: 18°18′54″N 66°14′54″W
- Commonwealth: Puerto Rico
- Municipality: Naranjito

Area
  - Total: 2.89 sq mi (7.5 km^{2})
  - Land: 2.80 sq mi (7.3 km^{2})
  - Water: 0.09 sq mi (0.23 km^{2})
- Elevation: 781 ft (238 m)

Population (2010)
  - Total: 3,919
  - Density: 1,399.6/sq mi (540.4/km^{2})
- Source: 2010 Census
- Time zone: UTC−4 (AST)
- ZIP code: 00719
- Area code: 787/939

Achiote is a barrio in the municipality of Naranjito, Puerto Rico. Its population in 2010 was 3,919.

== Description ==
Achiote is in northcentral Naranjito. According to the 2010 Census, Achiote had a total area of 2.89 square miles (7.5 km^{2}) including .09 square miles (0.23 km^{2}) of water. Achiote has an elevation of 781 feet (238 m). In 2010, its population was 3,919. Coleen Vázquez school (Escuela Coleen Vázquez Urrutia) is in Achiote.

== History ==
Achiote was in Spain's gazetteers until Puerto Rico was ceded by Spain in the aftermath of the Spanish–American War under the terms of the Treaty of Paris of 1898 and became an unincorporated territory of the United States. In 1899, the United States Department of War conducted a census of Puerto Rico in 1899 finding that the population of Achiote barrio was 1,094.

Historical population
Census	Pop.	Note	%±
1900	1,094		—
1910	1,080		−1.3%
1920	1,284		18.9%
1930	1,802		40.3%
1940	2,014		11.8%
1950	2,170		7.7%
1960	2,577		18.8%
1970	0		−100.0%
1980	3,727		—
1990	4,005		7.5%
2000	4,310		7.6%
2010	3,919		−9.1%
U.S. Decennial Census; 1899 (shown as 1900) 1910-1930; 1930-1950 1980-2000 2010

== Sectors ==
Barrios (which are, in contemporary times, roughly comparable to minor civil divisions) in turn are further subdivided into smaller local populated place areas/units called sectores (sectors in English). The types of sectores may vary, from normally sector to urbanización to reparto to barriada to residencial, among others.

The following sectors are in Achiote barrio:

Achiote Centro, Barriada La Aldea, Barriada La Colina, Camino Chago Vázquez, Camino Chilo Padilla, Comunidad Blas Vázquez, Comunidad Los Báez, Comunidad Neco Ortega, Comunidad Oscar Padilla, Comunidad Telésforo Torres, El Cuco, Fondo del Saco, Higuillales, La Galvana, Los Café, Los Nieves, Maravilla (Chícharo), Residencial Candelario Torres, Sector Achiote Adentro, Sector Desvío, Sector El Cementerio, Sector El Llano, Sector El Peñón, Sector Felipe Velásquez, Sector La Cantera, Sector La Cuesta de Cundo, Sector La Loma, Sector La Palma, Sector Los Chévere, Sector Monchito Martínez, Sector Tanita Morales, Sector Toñito Padilla, and Urbanización Jardines de Naranjito.

== Notable people from Achiote ==
Aryam Díaz from Achiote was selected to represent Puerto Rico in the Miss World 2021 pageant.

== Gallery ==
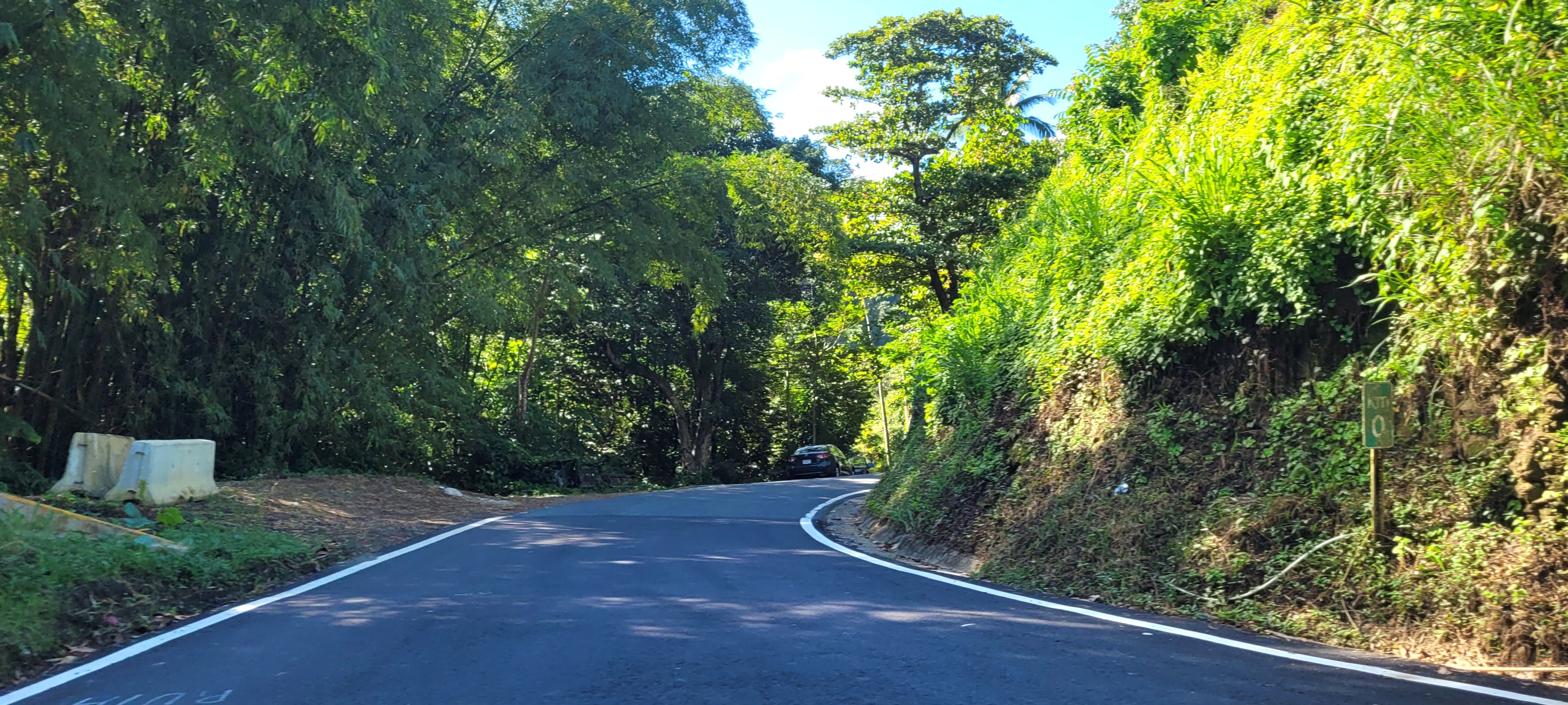
Puerto Rico Highway 810 in Achiote

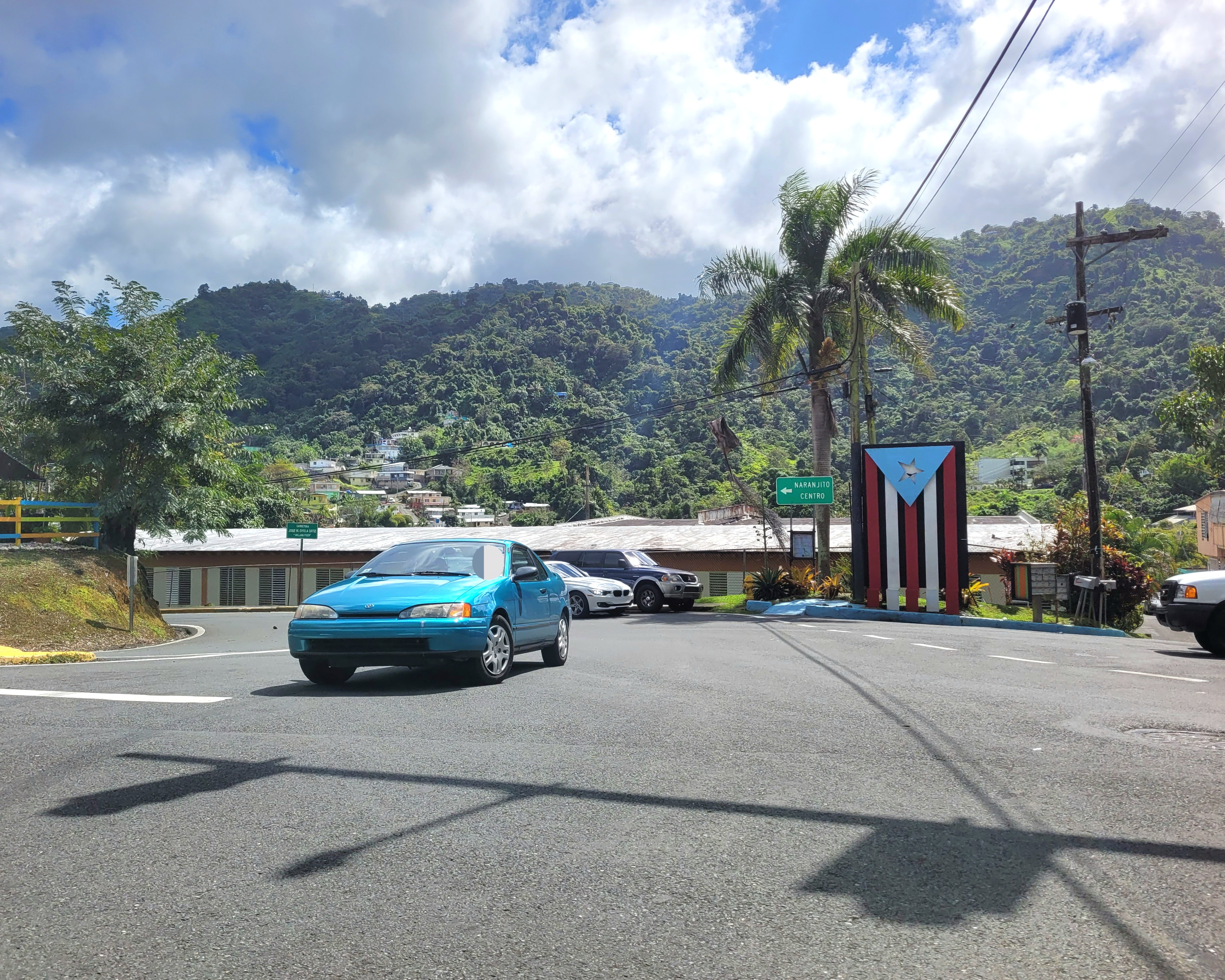
Puerto Rico Highway 825 in Achiote

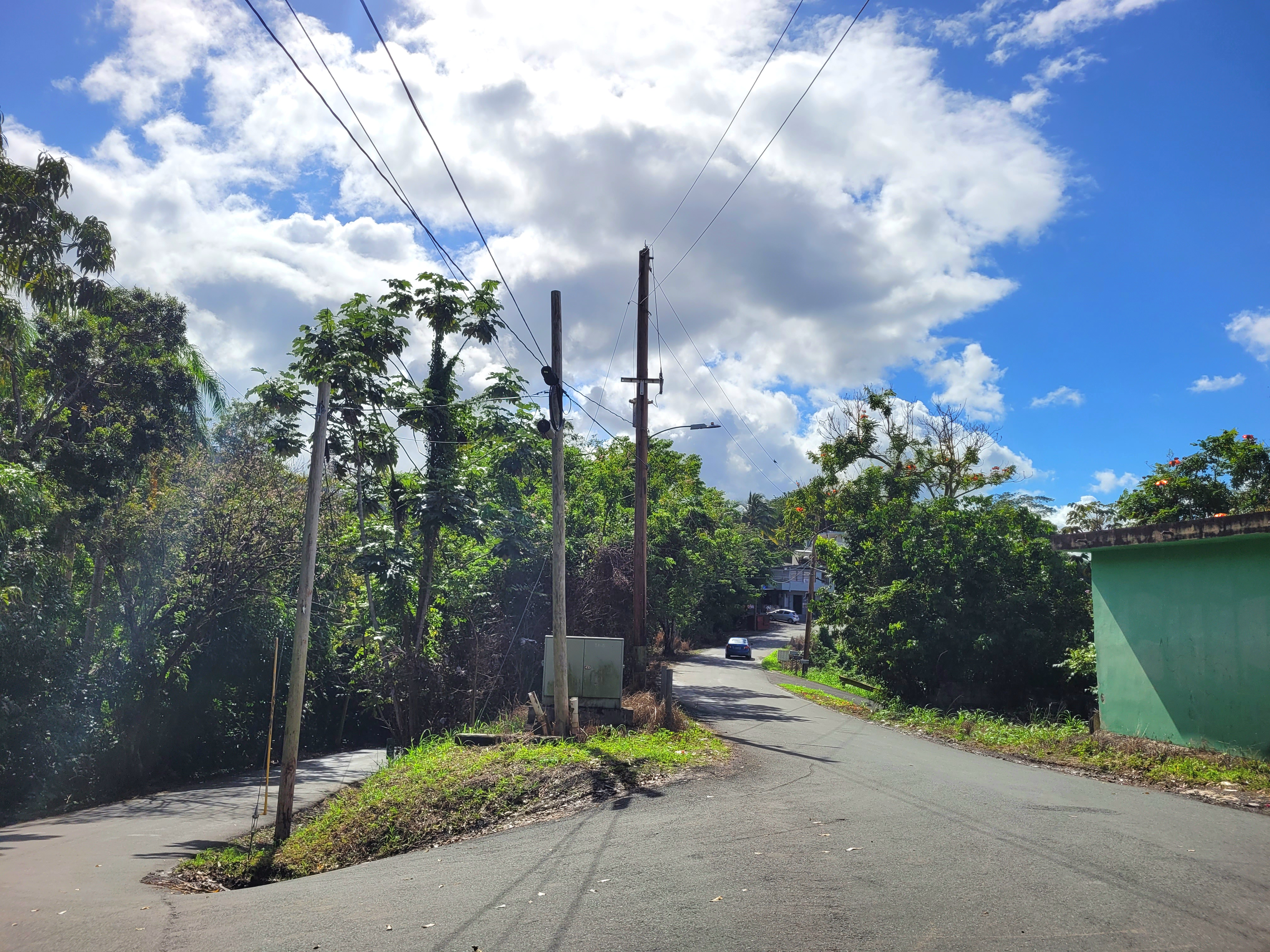
Puerto Rico Highway 884 at Puerto Rico Highway 882 intersection in Achiote

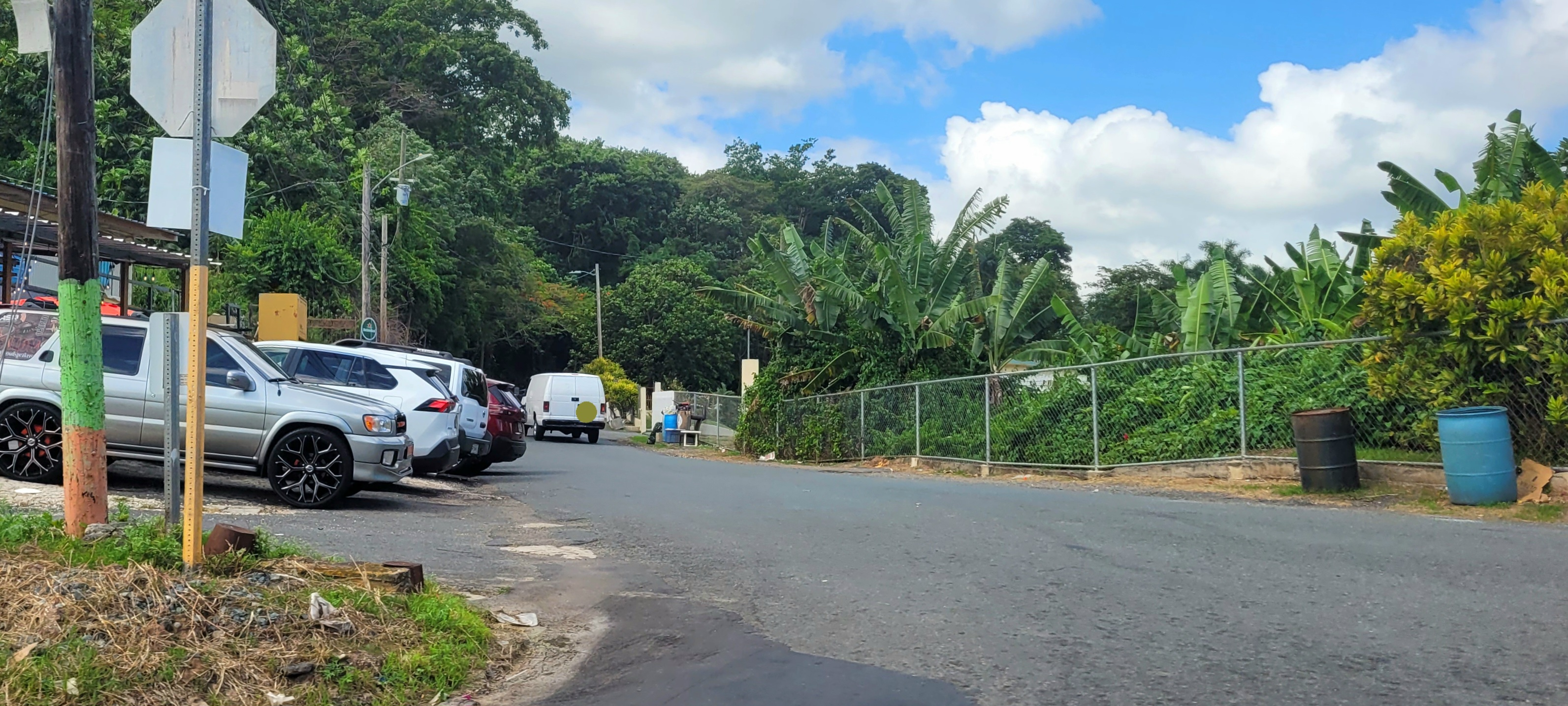
Puerto Rico Highway 884 in Achiote

== See also ==
- List of communities in Puerto Rico
- List of barrios and sectors of Naranjito, Puerto Rico
