= Jessica Gagen =

English aerospace engineer and beauty pageant titleholder (born 1995)

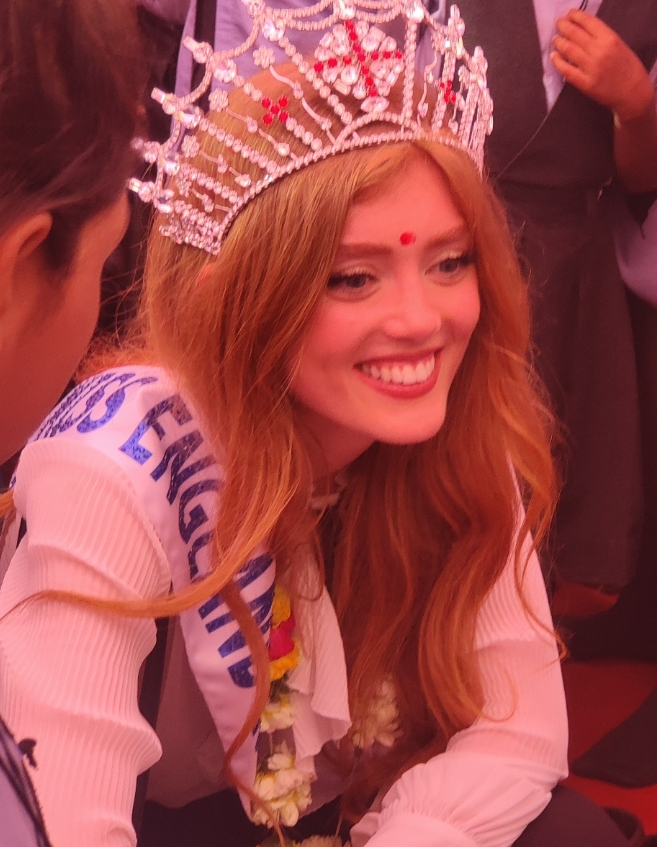
- Gagen in 2023
- Born: Jessica Ashley Gagen; 6 September 1995 (age 31); Skelmersdale, Lancashire, England
- Education: University of Liverpool
- Occupations: Aerospace engineer; model; beauty pageant titleholder
- Height: 1.75 m (5 ft 9 in)
- Beauty pageant titleholder
- Title: Miss England 2022; Miss World Europe 2023; Miss United Kingdom 2024
- Hair colour: Red
- Eye colour: Green
- Major competitions: Miss England 2021 (1st Runner-Up); Miss England 2022 (Winner); Miss World 2023 (Top 8) (Miss World Europe)

Jessica Ashley "Jess" Gagen (born 6 September 1995) is an English aerospace engineer, fashion model, and beauty pageant titleholder who was crowned Miss England 2022, and later finished as a Top 8 finalist in the Miss World 2023 pageant held in Mumbai, India, where she also received the title of Miss World Europe 2023 and Miss United Kingdom 2024.

Gagen holds a bachelor's degree in aerospace engineering from the University of Liverpool, and is an advocate for women and girls in STEM (Science, Technology, Engineering and Mathematics). She additionally works as a fashion model.

== Early life and education ==
Jessica Ashley Gagen was born on 6 September 1995 in Skelmersdale, Lancashire, England, where she was raised. She developed an early interest in science and engineering, influenced in part by her father's work in the engineering industry. Alongside her academic interests, she began modelling as a teenager, signing with a modelling agency at the age of 15. After initially focusing on modelling, she later decided to pursue a career in engineering, where she completed a foundation year in physics to meet the academic requirements for aerospace engineering before entering her degree programme. She subsequently attended the University of Liverpool in 2019, where she studied aerospace engineering. In July 2023, Gagen graduated with a degree in aerospace engineering, having completed a programme focused on the principles of flight and space science.

== Pageantry ==
=== Miss England ===
On 27 August 2021, Gagen entered the Miss England 2021 pageant representing the county of Lancashire, held at the Heart of England Conference and Events Centre in Coventry, where she finished as the 1st Runner-Up, behind Rehema Muthamia of Bedfordshire, who was crowned Miss England 2021 by the outgoing titleholder Bhasha Mukherjee.

On 17 October 2022, Gagen returned to the Miss England 2022 national competition, held at the Holiday Inn Birmingham NEC in Birmingham, representing the county of Lancashire once again, where she competed alongside twenty-eight other contestants across England for the national title. At the end of the event, Gagen was announced as the winner and was crowned Miss England 2022 by the outgoing titleholder, Rehema Muthamia, becoming the first redheaded woman to win the pageant. As part of her Beauty with a Purpose fundraising scheme, Gagen raised over £6,500 by running 5K, in different fancy dress costumes, consecutively for ninety-six days, in Liverpool.

=== Miss World ===
As Miss England 2022, Gagen represented England at the Miss World 2023 pageant in India, which was initially set to be held on 16 December 2023 but was later postponed to 9 March 2024 due to the 2024 Indian general election. During the fast-track events, Gagen placed in the Top 32 at the Sports Challenge and was initially among the Top 25 delegates of the Head-to-Head Challenge, where she spoke about fighting climate change and helping women in engineering, before being announced as one of the five winners along with Lesego Chombo of Botswana, Yasmina Zaytoun of Lebanon, Ada Eme of Nigeria, and Nokutenda Marumbwa of Zimbabwe. For the Miss World opening ceremony, Gagen wore a Mary-Poppins inspired dress from the 1964 song Supercalifragilisticexpialidocious, designed by Puneet Bhandal.

The coronation night of the pageant was held at the Jio World Convention Centre in Mumbai, where she finished as a Top 8 finalist and runner-up in the Europe continent behind Krystyna Pyszková of the Czech Republic, who eventually crowned Miss World 2023 at the conclusion of the event. As the highest-placing contestant among the European delegates in the pageant aside from the newly crowned winner, Gagen received the title of Miss World Europe 2023. She was also named Miss United Kingdom 2024, as the contestant who achieved the highest placement among the four British representatives at the Miss World competition, with the other three being Kaitlyn Clarke of Northern Ireland, Chelsie Allison of Scotland, and Darcey Corria of Wales who placed in the Top 40.

== Aerospace engineering ==
In the autumn of 2023, Gagen was invited by the Comms Team at the ISS National Lab in Las Vegas, Nevada to give a keynote speech at the ASCEND Space Conference where she discussed about engaging the public through the International Space Station and shares her ideas on how to educate the next generation of women and children in STEM. After the event, Gagen later on flown to Orlando, Florida, after she was invited to visit the NASA's Kennedy Space Center at the Merritt Island, where she worked alongside the Boeing's social media team at the Space Coast to develop materials highlighting the role of STEM disciplines in aerospace. Her activities at NASA's Kennedy Space Center area included touring Boeing facilities, participating in a panel discussion with Redwire Space, and planning to observe the SpaceX cargo resupply mission to the International Space Station, which was scheduled to launch from the center on 7 November.

== Public image and advocacies ==
Jessica Gagen is known for being an advocate for increasing female participation in science, technology, engineering, and mathematics (STEM), particularly within the aerospace and engineering sectors, which are traditionally male-dominated. She has consistently used her platform as Miss England 2022 to promote awareness of opportunities for women and girls in these fields. Before becoming Miss England, Gagen launched the initiative #STEMSchoolTalks, through which she delivers complimentary educational sessions in schools aimed at encouraging young women to pursue STEM-related careers. She has also used social media to present technical concepts in an accessible format to wider audiences. Her outreach has reached thousands of students across the United Kingdom and a global online audience, leading to speaking engagements at institutions such as the UK House of Lords and the Royal Aeronautical Society. She has been appointed as an ambassador for International Women in Engineering Day and the National Numeracy charity.

Gagen is the first redheaded woman to be crowned Miss England, and has spoken publicly about experiencing bullying while growing up due to her natural red hair, particularly during her secondary school years, which influenced her to addressed issues related to bullying and advocated for anti-bullying awareness, where she used her public platform to promote self-confidence and resilience, particularly among young people who have faced similar experiences.

Awards and achievements
| Preceded by (Northern Ireland) Anna Leitch | Miss United Kingdom; 2024 | Succeeded by (Wales) Millie-Mae Adams |
| Preceded by (Northern Ireland) Anna Leitch | Miss World Europe; 2023 | Succeeded by (Poland) Maja Klajda |
| Preceded by Rehema Muthamia | Miss World England; 2023 | Succeeded by Charlotte Grant |
| Preceded by Rehema Muthamia | Miss England; 2022 - 2023 | Succeeded by Milla Magee |
