= Miss Grand China =

Chinese beauty pageant title

- Formation: September 25, 2024; 2 years ago
- Type: Beauty pageant
- Headquarters: Zhanjiang
- Location: China
- Members: Miss Grand International
- Official language: Chinese
- National director: Jiang Siqi (2026–present)
- Parent organization: Shengyu Xinghui Wenhua Chuanbo Ltd. (2024–present)

Miss Grand China
licensees timeline

Stand-alone pageant
Under another pageant
Appointed titleholder
No licensee/titleholder

Miss Grand China (Chinese: 万国小姐中国区) is a national female beauty pageant to select China's representatives for the Miss Grand International contest. The title was first awarded in 2013 when an actress from Shenyang, Jie Pan (潘洁), was chosen to represent the country at the inaugural edition of Miss Grand International in Thailand.

Previously, the country representatives for the Miss Grand International pageant were determined through The Miss China (年度中国版图小姐竞选) contest, which was conducted by Guangzhou Zhoumeng Marketing, Co., Ltd., to which MGI PLC, the owner of Miss Grand International, awarded the franchise in 2013. The license was later transferred to a Zhanjiang-based event organizer, Xin Fu Lai Enterprise Management Co., Ltd., and Shengyu Xinghui Wenhua Chuanbo Ltd. in 2020 and 2024, respectively.

Since the first participation in 2013, China's representatives have never won the Miss Grand International title. The highest placement is the top 20 finalists in 2013 and 2017, obtained by Jie Pan and Chen Xuejiao, respectively.

== History ==
China made its Miss Grand International debut in 2013. Its first representative, Jie Pan, was appointed by the Guangzhou-based event organizer led by Adam Lee, Guangzhou Zhoumeng Marketing Co., Ltd., who served as Miss Grand China's national licensee from 2013 to 2020. The company also launched its national pageant in 2013 named The Miss China (年度中国版图小姐竞选) to select the country representatives for various international pageants, including Miss Grand International.

In the first years of establishment, the winners of the aforementioned national pageant were also assumed as Miss Grand China. However, after an international pageant called Miss Landscape International was launched by Adam Lee in 2018, the winners of The Miss China were instead sent to participate in his own established international pageant, and one of the runners-up was later appointed as Miss Grand China, causing the license to be transferred to another firm, Xin Fu Lai Enterprise Management, in 2020 until 2021.

In 2021, an attempt to organize the inaugural edition of the Miss Grand China pageant was observed. The press conference of such was held in Zhanjiang on March 13, 2021, and the grand final competition was scheduled for October 4, also in Zhanjiang, but the plan was entirely canceled due to the impact of China government travel restrictions during the COVID-19 pandemic in 2021–2022, which caused Xin Fu Lai to appoint Chinese Canadians to join the international pageant as China representatives.

After an absence in 2023, the license was given to Shengyu Xinghui Wenhua Chuanbo Ltd. (盛娱星汇文化传播) led by Fang Yuxiang (方宇翔) the following year. The first Miss Grand China was then organized in Nanhai on 25 September 2024 with fifteen contestants competing.

Beginning in 2025, regional competitions have been organized to determine finalists for the national final, such as the Yunnan Xishuangbanna stage in 2025, the Chongqing, Guangdong, Zhejiang, and Greater Bay Area stages in 2026.

== Editions ==
The Miss Grand China pageant was organized as an independent competition on two occasions, specifically in 2024 and 2025.

=== Date and venue ===
Edition	Date	Final Venue	Entrants	Ref.
1st	25 Sep 2024	Foshan Di'en Hotel, Nanhai, Foshan	15	
2nd	21 Sep 2025	Xinghe Mai Di Art Center, Guangzhou	20	
3rd	1 Sep 2026	1978 Cultural Creative Park, Guangzhou		

=== Competition result ===
Edition	Winner	Runners-up				Ref.
Edition	Winner	1st	2nd	3rd	4th	Ref.
2024	Zhongyi Sun	Jin Mei	Liu Yiping	Guo Xuanmeng	Wu Yuman	
2025	Xióng Ruòhán	Wang Qiu Yu	Tian Yue	Not awarded		

== International competition ==
The following is a list of Chinese representatives at the Miss Grand International contest.

Color keys

- : Declared as the winner
- : Ended as a runner-up (Top 5)
- : Ended as a finalist (Top 10)
- : Ended as a semifinalist (Top 20/21)
- : Ended as special awards winner

Year	Miss Grand China		National qualification	Placement	Special Awards	National Director
Year	Ramanized name	Chinese name	National qualification	Placement	Special Awards	National Director
2026	Liu Mengmeng	刘萌萌	Miss Grand China 2026 winner	Top 25	Best National Costume (Top 15)	Jiang Siqi
2025	Xiong Ruohan	熊若涵	Miss Grand China 2025 winner	Unplaced		Fang Yuxiang (方宇翔)
2024	Sun Zhongyi	孙中艺	Miss Grand China 2024 winner	Unplaced		Fang Yuxiang (方宇翔)
2023	Did not compete					
2022	Shirley Jia Si Yu	賈思雨	Finalist Miss World Canada 2022	Unplaced		Shelley Wei
2021	Shelley Wei	韦伊	Top 5 Miss Universe China 2019	Did not compete		Shelley Wei
2020	Fiona Tao Pinlu	陶品璐	Finalist Miss World Canada 2020	Unplaced		Shelley Wei
2019	Deng Jiefang	邓杰方	2nd runner-up The Miss China 2019	Unplaced		Adam Lee
2019	Xingxing Ma	马醒醒	The Miss China 2019	Did not compete		Adam Lee
2018	Xing Wanxin	邢萬欣	The Miss China 2018	Unplaced		Adam Lee
2017	Chen Xuejiao	陈雪姣	The Miss China 2017	Top 20	Best Evening Gown	Adam Lee
2016	He Siru	何思儒	1st runner-up The Miss China 2016	Unplaced		Adam Lee
2016	Zhang Wenqi	张雯棋	The Miss China 2016	Did not compete		Adam Lee
2015	Xie Huili	谢慧莉	Miss Grand China 2015	Unplaced		Adam Lee
2014	Han Xue	韩雪	The Miss China 2014	Unplaced		Adam Lee
2013	Pan Jie	潘洁	Top 16 Miss Universe China 2013	Top 20	Best National Costume	Adam Lee

== Winners' gallery ==
Liu Mengmeng (2026)

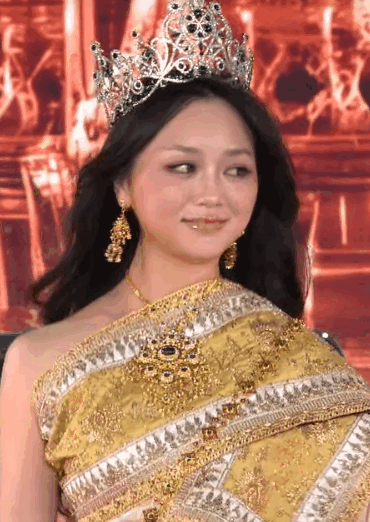
Xiong Ruohan (2025)

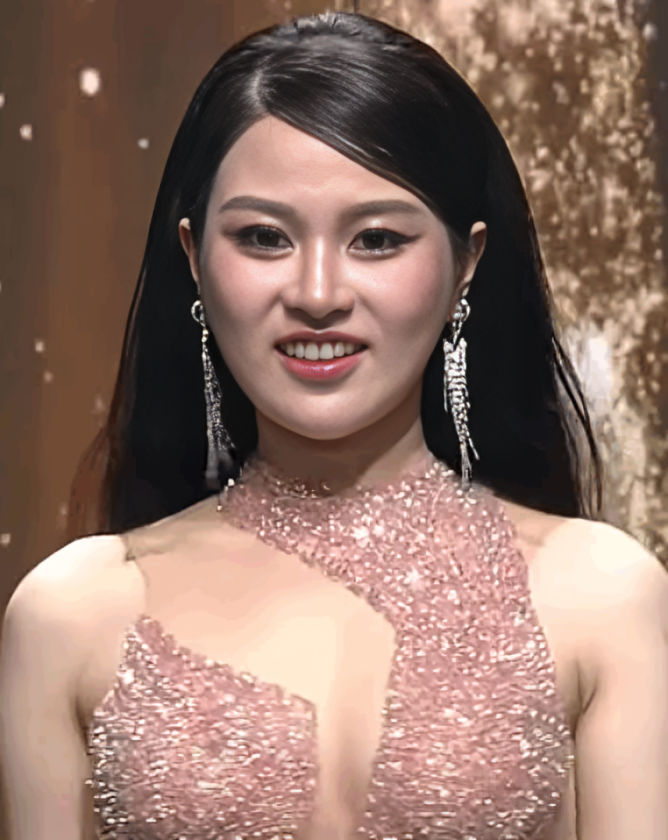
Sun Zhongyi (2024)

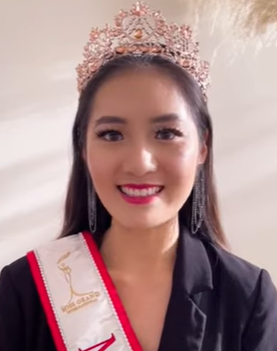
Shirley Yu (2022)
