= Miss Spain 2022 =

Miss Spain 2022 may refer to these events:

- Miss Universe Spain 2022, Miss Spain 2022 for Miss Universe 2022
- Miss World Spain 2022, Miss Spain 2022 for Miss World 2022
