= St. Peter's College, Dunboyne =

St. Peter's College
- Dunboyne, County Meath; Ireland

Information
- Type: Secondary school
- Established: 1994
- Principal: Deirdre Maye
- Gender: Mixed
- Age range: 12–19
- Website: www.stpeterscc.ie

St. Peter's College is a 12–19 mixed secondary school in Dunboyne, County Meath, Ireland.

== History ==
The process of providing a school for Dunboyne began in earnest in September 1992 when the Parent Teacher Association of Dunboyne National School called a public meeting to ascertain the need for post primary education in the area. After debates on the management structure, an agreement was reached between the County Meath Vocational Education Committee (VEC) and the Bishop of Meath. Since then, the VEC has been abolished and replaced by Louth and Meath Education and Training Board.

St. Peter's College opened in September 1994 with an enrolment of 75 first-year students. Current enrollment is approximately 1,150 students.

In January 2010, a 3,431 square meter extension was approved.

Another extension was completed in 2020.

== In popular media ==
In 2009, the school was featured in "The School", a documentary series by RTE that followed the students and teachers of the school over one academic year.

== Notable alumni ==
- CMAT (b. 1996) - singer-songwriter
- Darren Sutherland (1982-2009) - former middleweight boxer, Olympic bronze medallist
- Niall Quinn (b. 1988) - racing driver
- Sinéad Noonan (b. 1987) - Miss Ireland 2008
