= Miss World Belize =

Beauty pageant

- Formation: 1987
- Type: Beauty pageant
- Headquarters: Belize City
- Location: Belize
- Members: Miss World
- Official language: English

Miss World Belize is a national Beauty pageant in Belize. The winner of this pageant goes to compete at Miss World pageant.

== History ==
Miss World Belize pageant was launched in 1987, It was also the first year Belize sent its first representative to the Miss World beauty pageant.

== Miss World Belize ==
Color key

- Declared as Winner
- Ended as runner-up
- Ended as one of the finalists or semifinalists

Year	Miss World Belize	Placement	Special Awards
1987	Janine Sylvestre	Unplaced	
1988	Pauline Young	Unplaced	
1989	Martha Elena Badillo	Unplaced	
1990	Ysela Antonia Zabaneh	Unplaced	
1991	Josephine Gault	Unplaced	
2002	Karen Russell	Unplaced	
2003	Dalila Vanzie	Unplaced	
2007	Felicita Arzú	Unplaced	
2008	Charmaine Chinapen	Unplaced	
2009	Norma Leticia Lara	Unplaced	
2010	Jessel Lauriano	Unplaced	
2011	Kadejah Tunn	Unplaced	
2012	Chantae Chanice Guy	Unplaced	Miss World Top Model (Top 10)
2013	Idolly Louise Saldivar	Unplaced	
2014	Raquel Badillo	Unplaced	
2015	Jasmin Jael Rhamdas	Unplaced	
2016	Iris Salguero	Unplaced	
2017	Renae Martinez	Unplaced	
2018	Jalyssa Arthurs	Unplaced	
2021	Markeisha Young	Unplaced	
2022	Miss World 2021 was rescheduled to 16 March 2022 due to the COVID-19 pandemic outbreak in Puerto Rico, no edition started in 2022		
2023	Elise-Gayonne Vernon	Top 40	
2025	Shayari Morataya	Unplaced	
2026	Faith Edgar	Top 40	
2027	TBA	TBA	

== See also ==
- Miss Universe Belize
- Miss Earth Belize
