= Laura Patterson =

Irish model

Laura Patterson is an Irish lawyer, model and beauty pageant titleholder who was crowned Miss Ireland 2009.

Patterson was studying Law and Accountancy at the University of Ulster when she beat thirty-one other contestants to win the title in a ceremony held at the Royal Marine Hotel, Dublin. Judges included Michelle Heaton, Celebrity Agent Tara Sinnott from Red Carpet, and former Miss Ireland Vivienne Doyle. Prior to her victory, Patterson had been crowned Miss Teen Ireland 2005. The aspiring media practitioner now models for Converse and Assets, and represented Ireland at Miss World 2009 in South Africa.

Unlike most title holders, Patterson was not based in Dublin ("I think it's great that this year's Miss Ireland comes from the city...I will be staying [in Derry]").
