= Miss Côte d'Ivoire =

Beauty pageant

Comité Miss Côte d'ivoire
- Formation: 1956; 70 years ago
- Type: Beauty pageant
- Headquarters: Yamoussoukro
- Location: Ivory Coast
- Members: Miss World; Miss International; Miss Supranational; Miss Grand International; Miss Cosmo
- Official language: French
- Chairman: Victor Yapobi

Miss Côte d'Ivoire is a national Beauty pageant that selects Ivory Coast's official representatives in Miss World, Miss International, Miss Supranational and Miss Cosmo.

== History ==
Miss Cote d'Ivoire has existed since 1956 but currently, Miss Cote d'Ivoire new team was placed since 1996. The committee Miss Côte d'Ivoire is an association chaired by Victor Yapobi (Comici). The organizing committee created in 1996 consists of an executive committee of six members and regional committees throughout Côte d'Ivoire. There are even elections were held for the Ivorian out in 2002, 2008, 2009 and 2010 organized by the EU-Comici under the supervision of the Secretary General of the Committee Miss Côte d'Ivoire.

== Titleholders ==
The winner of Miss Côte d'Ivoire represents her country at the Miss World. On occasion, when the winner does not qualify (due to age) for either contest, a runner-up is sent. — Marie-Françoise Kouamé was competed at Miss Universe 1986 in Panama City, Panama. She was represented CI at the pageant. Cote d'Ivoire competed at the pageant in only 1 year and never return again until now. Maria was appointed to compete at Miss International 1986 in Nagasaki, Japan. She failed at the pageant but she is the only one Ivorian who marked her country at two prestigious pageants in the World. Madaussou Kamara became the second representative at Miss International 1999 in Tokyo, Japan. She was the runner-up at Miss Cote d'Ivoire, in unknown reasons the reigning winner of Miss CI in that year, Sylviane Dodoo did not compete at all pageants.

Year	Miss CIV
1956	Marthe Niankoury
1965	Monique Kessié
1985	Rose-Armande Oulla
1986	Marie-Françoise Kouamé
1987	Georgette Bailly
1988	Cecilia Valentin
1989	Muriel Edoukou
1993	Lydie Aka
1996	Hermine Mimi
1997	Aicha Rami Kéïta
1998	Laeticia N'Cho
1999	Sylviane Dodoo
2000	Linda Delon
2001	Nadia Gaëlle Yoboué
2002	Yannick Azébian
2004	Tania Kessié
2005	Séry Djehy Dorcas
2006	Alima Diomandé
2007	Bernadette N'zi
2008	Murielle-Claude Nanié
2009	Dacoury Rosine Gnago
2010	Inès Da Sylva
2011	Kohiman Kouadio
2012	Hélène Valérie Djouka
2013	Aissata Dia Ezzedine
2014	Jennifer Yéo
2015	Andréa Kakou N'Guessan
2016	Esther Memel
2017	Mandjalia Gbane
2018	Fatem Suy
2019	Tara Gueye
2020	Felice Nina Mawualawe
2021	Olivia Yacé
2022	Marlène Kouassi
2023	Mylene Djihony
2024	Marie-Emmanuelle Diamala
2025	Fatima Koné
2026	Affoué Cadic Louisette N'Guessan

== Ivorian representatives at international pageants ==
=== Miss Universe Cote d'Ivoire ===
- : Declared as Winner
- : Ended as runner-up or top 5/6 qualification
- : Ended as one of the finalists or semifinalists
- : Ended as special awards winner

The winner of Miss Cote d'Ivoire represented Cote d'Ivoire at the Miss Universe pageant once, in 1986. In 2024 the country set to return under "Miss Universe Cote d'Ivoire Organization". On occasion, when the winner does not qualify (due to age) for either contest, a runner-up is sent.

Year	Region	Miss Universe Cote d'Ivoire	Placement at Miss Universe	Special awards	Notes
Victor Yapobi directorship — a franchise holder to Miss Universe from 2024
Did not compete in 2026
2025	Abidjan	Olivia Manuela Yacé	4th Runner-up	Miss Universe Africa & Oceania (resigned)	Previously Miss Cote d'Ivoire 2021: 2nd Runner-Up and the Continental Queen of Africa at Miss World 2021
2024	Sud-Comoé	Marie-Emmanuelle Diamala	Unplaced		Beginning in 2024, the Miss Universe Organization announced that Victor Yapobi will be the National Director of Miss Universe Côte d'Ivoire.
Did not compete between 2013―2023
2012	Abidjan	Marie-Josee Ouattara	Did not compete		
Did not compete between 1989―2011
1988	-	Cecilia Valentin	Did not compete		
1987	Abidjan	Georgette Bailly	Did not compete		
1986	Abidjan	Marie-Françoise Kouamé	Unplaced		
1985	Abidjan	Rose Armande Oulla	Did not compete		

=== Miss World Cote d'Ivoire ===
- : Declared as Winner
- : Ended as runner-up or top 5/6 qualification
- : Ended as one of the finalists or semifinalists
- : Ended as special awards winner

The winner of Miss Côte d'Ivoire represents her country at the Miss World. On occasion, when the winner does not qualify (due to age) for either contest, a runner-up is sent.

Year	Region	Miss World Cote d'Ivoire	Placement at Miss World	Special awards	Notes
Victor Yapobi directorship — a franchise holder to Miss World from 2009
2027	Gbêkê	Louisette N'Guessan	TBA		
2026	Agnéby-Tiassa	Fatima Koné	Unplaced		
2025	Gontougo	Fatoumata Coulibaly	Unplaced		
Miss World 2023 was rescheduled to 2024 due to the change of host and when entering India as the new host, there were several issues that caused the postponement until March 2024.
2023	Aboisso	Mylene Djihony	Unplaced		
Miss World 2021 was rescheduled to 16 March 2022 due to the COVID-19 pandemic outbreak in Puerto Rico, no edition started in 2022.
2021	Yamoussoukro	Olivia Yacé	2nd Runner-up	Miss World Africa; Miss World Top Model; Miss World Multimedia; Best Designer Dress (1st Runner-up); Miss World Talent (Top 27)	Later Miss Universe Côte d'Ivoire 2025
Did not compete between 2018 and 2020
2017	Bondoukou	Mandjalia Gbané	Unplaced		
2016	Yamoussoukro	Esther Memel	Unplaced		
2015	Yamoussoukro	Andréa N'Guessan	Top 30	World Designer Award (Top-10)	
2014	Aboisso	Jennifer Yéo	Unplaced		
2013	Aboisso	Aïssata Dia	Unplaced		
2012	Divo	Hélène-Valerie Djouka	Unplaced		
2011	Gagnoa	Kohiman Kouadio	Unplaced		
2010	N'zi-Comoé	Inès Da Silva	Unplaced		
2009	—	Dacoury Rosine Gnago	Unplaced		
Did not compete between 1986 and 2008
1985	Abidjan	Rose Armande Oulla	Unplaced		Cote d'Ivoire wore the name of "Ivory Coast". In 1986 as well; based on US Recognition of the Ivory Coast, 1960. Eisenhower sent a letter to that effect to Prime Minister Felix Houphouet-Boigny. The area that became the Ivory Coast on that same date previously had been under French sovereignty. The state's name changed from Ivory Coast to Cote d'Ivoire in 1986.

=== Miss Supranational Cote d'Ivoire ===
- : Declared as Winner
- : Ended as runner-up or top 5/6 qualification
- : Ended as one of the finalists or semifinalists
- : Ended as special awards winner

Year	Region	Miss Supranational Cote d'Ivoire	Placement at Miss Supranational	Special awards	Notes
Victor Yapobi directorship — a franchise holder to Miss Supranational from 2013
2013	Abidjan	Reine Aka	Unplaced		
2019	Abidjan	Zao Ouhonssio	Unplaced		
2022	Abidjan	Cadic N'guessan	Unplaced		
2023	Abidjan	Yasmine Wognin	Unplaced		
2024	Gbêkê	Marie-Louise Maitre	Unplaced		
2026	Abidjan	Lisa Konan	Unplaced		

=== Miss Cosmo Cote d'Ivoire ===
- : Declared as Winner
- : Ended as runner-up or top 5/6 qualification
- : Ended as one of the finalists or semifinalists
- : Ended as special awards winner

Year	Region	Miss Cosmo Cote d'Ivoire	Placement at Miss Cosmo	Special awards	Notes
Victor Yapobi directorship — a franchise holder to Miss Cosmo from 2024
2024	Abidjan	Danielle Boué	Unplaced		

== See also ==
- Miss France
