= Miss World Spain 2022 =

Beauty pageant edition

- Date: 18 June 2022
- Venue: Marina d'Or - Ciudad Vacaciones, Pineda de Mar, Barcelona, Catalonia, Spain
- Entrants: 50
- Placements: 26
- Withdrawals: Huelva; Melilla
- Winner: Paula Pérez Sánchez; Castellón

Miss World Spain 2022 was the 9th edition of the Miss World Spain pageant. The winner was Paula Pérez Sánchez of Castellón and she represented Spain at Miss World 2022.

== Final results ==
=== Placements ===
Final results	Contestant
Miss World Spain 2022	Castellón — Paula Pérez Sánchez
1st Runner-Up	Las Palmas — Andrea Franco
2nd Runner-Up	Málaga — María José García
Top 6	Barcelona — Mireia Casajuana; Navarre — Laura Etayo; Sevilla — Indara Fuentes
Top 12	Araba — Yaiza Etxaniz; Lugo — Carolina Roca; Madrid — Sara Robles; Tenerife — Cristina Belda; Valencia Province — Beatriz Medina; Zaragoza — Júlia Nsi Bindang
Top 26	Ávila — Alba Codorniu; Balearic Islands - Alba Tarela; Cáceres — Judith Sarro; Córdoba — Inmaculada Romero; Cuenca — Ainhoa Parra; Gerona — Sonia Sun; Guadalajara — Marina Gómez; Huesca — Sandra Pazvantov; Jaén — Elisa Arboledas; La Coruña - Judit García Fábregas; La Rioja — Natalia Letorova; Salamanca — Telma Iglesias; Teruel — Júlia Muratet; Toledo — Violeta Crespo

=== Challenge Events ===
==== Beauty with a Purpose ====
Final results	Contestant
Winner	
Top 10	Burgos — Devora Niembro; Castellón — Paula Pérez Sánchez; Cuenca — Ainhoa Parra; Guadalajara — Marina Gómez; Las Palmas — Andrea Franco; Pontevedra — Sofía Rodríguez; Salamanca — Telma Iglesias; Sevilla — Indara Fuentes; Valencia Province — Beatriz Medina; Valladolid — Tania Guerra

==== Public Vote ====
Final results	Contestant
Winner	
Top 5	Gerona — Sonia Sun; Huesca — Sandra Pazvantov; Segovia — Carmen Martín; Soria — María Murillo; Valladolid — Tania Guerra

==== Regional Costume ====
Final results	Contestant
Winner	
Top 5	Balearic Islands - Alba Tarela; Cáceres — Judith Sarro; Castellón — Paula Pérez Sánchez; Córdoba — Inmaculada Romero; Valencia Province — Beatriz Medina

==== Sports ====
Final results	Contestant
Winner	
Top 5	Cantabria — Andrea Crespo; La Coruña — Judit García Fábregas; Málaga — María José García; Navarre — Laura Etayo; Valladolid — Tania Guerra

==== Talent ====
Final results	Contestant
Winner	
Top 5	Albacete — Laura López; Castellón — Paula Pérez Sánchez; Las Palmas — Andrea Franco; Tenerife — Cristina Belda; Vizcaya — Ainhoa García

==== Top Model ====
Final results	Contestant
Winner	
Top 5	Castellón — Paula Pérez Sánchez; Lugo — Carolina Roca; Madrid — Sara Robles; Málaga — María José García; Navarre — Laura Etayo

== Judges ==
- Francisco Fajardo - President/Head of the Judges
- Mireia Lalaguna Royo - Miss World Spain 2015 from Barcelona & Miss World 2015 from Spain
- Cuca Miquel
- Carlos Pérez Gimeno
- Daniel Carnade
- David Cabaleiro
- Jorge Borrajo
- Rachid Mohamed
- Andrea Ventulori

== Official Delegates ==
The delegates for Miss World Spain 2022 are:

Province	Candidate	Age	Height
Albacete	Laura López	25	175 cm (5 ft 9 in)
Alicante	Soledad Amat	21	172 cm (5 ft 7.5 in)
Almería	Patrícia Carpio	20	176 cm (5 ft 9.5 in)
Araba	Yaiza Etxaniz	23	175 cm (5 ft 9 in)
Asturias	Lucía Pérez	19	175 cm (5 ft 9 in)
Ávila	Alba Codorniu	22	172 cm (5 ft 7.5 in)
Badajoz	Susana Galache	27	175 cm (5 ft 9 in)
Balearic Islands	Alba Tarela	19	174 cm (5 ft 8.5 in)
Barcelona	Mireia Casajuana	23	186 cm (6 ft 1 in)
Burgos	Devora Niembro	26	172 cm (5 ft 7.5 in)
Cáceres	Judith Sarró	27	170 cm (5 ft 7 in)
Cádiz	Laura Monturiol	20	172 cm (5 ft 7.5 in)
Cantabria	Andrea Crespo	21	172 cm (5 ft 7.5 in)
Castellón	Paula Pérez Sánchez	25	174 cm (5 ft 8.5 in)
Ceuta	Cynthia León	19	180 cm (5 ft 11 in)
Ciudad Real	Jennifer Cebria	20	175 cm (5 ft 9 in)
Córdoba	Inmaculada Romero	25	174 cm (5 ft 8.5 in)
Cuenca	Ainhoa Parra	24	174 cm (5 ft 8.5 in)
Gerona	Sonia Sun	18	177 cm (5 ft 9.5 in)
Granada	Najat Farih	19	172 cm (5 ft 7.5 in)
Guadalajara	Marina Gómez	27	168 cm (5 ft 6 in)
Guipúzcoa	Douae Benslaiman	21	170 cm (5 ft 7 in)
Huesca	Sandra Pazvantov	17	178 cm (5 ft 10 in)
Jaén	Elisa Arboledas	26	172 cm (5 ft 7.5 in)
La Coruña	Judit García Fábregas	23	167 cm (5 ft 6 in)
La Rioja	Natalia Letorova	21	174 cm (5 ft 8.5 in)
Las Palmas	Andrea Franco	25	174 cm (5 ft 8.5 in)
León	Sonia Robles	18	178 cm (5 ft 10 in)
Lérida	Eva Español	28	170 cm (5 ft 7 in)
Lugo	Carolina Roca	22	177 cm (5 ft 9.5 in)
Madrid	Sara Robles	19	178 cm (5 ft 10 in)
Málaga	María José García	22	175 cm (5 ft 9 in)
Murcia	Jennifer Sanchez	24	170 cm (5 ft 7 in)
Navarre	Laura Etayo	26	180 cm (5 ft 11 in)
Orense	Alexandra Asín	24	167 cm (5 ft 6 in)
Palencia	Lydia Rubio	22	167 cm (5 ft 6 in)
Pontevedra	Sofía Rodríguez	18	172 cm (5 ft 7.5 in)
Salamanca	Telma Iglesias	25	176 cm (5 ft 9.5 in)
Segovia	Carmen Martín	25	176 cm (5 ft 9.5 in)
Sevilla	Indara Fuentes	17	177 cm (5 ft 9.5 in)
Soria	María Murillo	20	170 cm (5 ft 7 in)
Tarragona	Marina Lopez Ruiz	22	175 cm (5 ft 9 in)
Tenerife	Cristina Belda	21	170 cm (5 ft 7 in)
Teruel	Júlia Muratet	27	174 cm (5 ft 8.5 in)
Toledo	Violeta Crespo	20	174 cm (5 ft 8.5 in)
Valencia Province	Beatriz Medina	23	175 cm (5 ft 9 in)
Valladolid	Tania Guerra	22	176 cm (5 ft 9.5 in)
Vizcaya	Ainhoa García	20	170 cm (5 ft 7 in)
Zamora	Carmen Huerga	24	170 cm (5 ft 7 in)
Zaragoza	Júlia Nsi Bindang	21	176 cm (5 ft 9.5 in)

== Notes ==
=== Withdrawals ===
- Huelva
- Melilla

=== Did not compete ===
- Aragón
- Canary Islands
- Extremadura
- Galicia
