= Miss Grand China 2024 =

First Miss Grand China competition

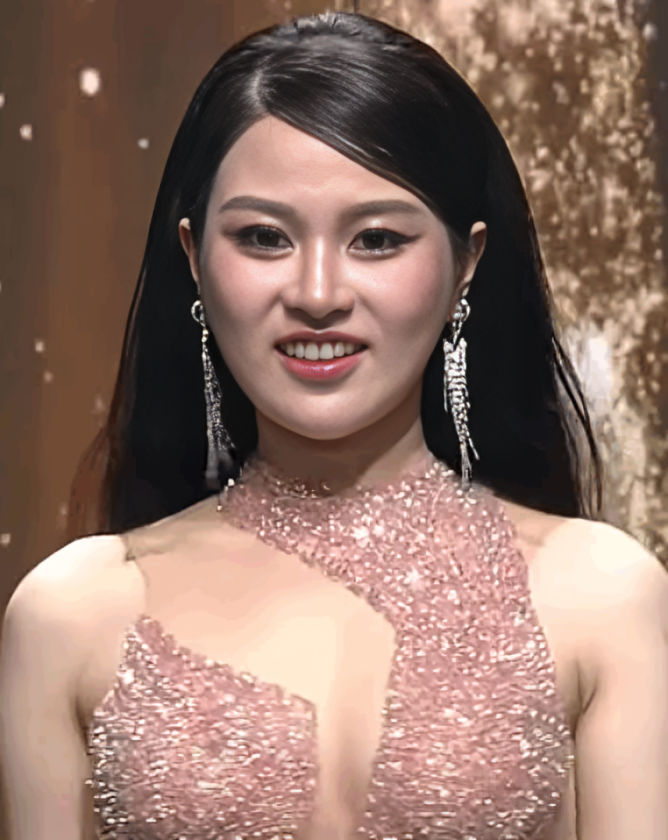
- Zhongyi Sun, the winner of the contest
- Date: 25 September 2024
- Venue: Foshan Di'en Hotel, Nanhai, Foshan
- Entrants: 15
- Placements: 10
- Winner: Zhongyi Sun (Guilin)
- Congeniality: Zhongyi Sun (Guilin)
- Photogenic: Jin Mei (Hangzhou)

Miss Grand China 2024 (Chinese: 2024万国小姐中国区大) was the first edition of the Miss Grand China pageant, held on 25 September 2024 at the Foshan Di'en Hotel, Nanhai, Foshan. Fifteen contestants competed for the title.

The pageant was won by Zhongyi Sun (孙中艺) of Guilin. Sun will represent China at the Miss Grand International 2024 pageant to be held in Thailand on 25 October 2024.

== Background ==
After a Guangdong-based event organizer company, Shengyu Xinghui Culture Media Co., Ltd. (盛娱星汇文化传播有限公司), obtained the license of Miss Grand International for China in early 2024, it joined forces with Undefined Fashion Aesthetics (Undefined无定义时尚美学), a fashion model agency based in Guangzhou, and the application for the first Miss Grand China competition was then opened in May 2024. Through profile screening, 86 applicants qualified for the preliminary interviews organized from May to August 2024. The finals-16 were then revealed in early September 2024. All screening events were broadcast live through Miss Grand China's social media accounts in Douyin.

The judges in the preliminary interview rounds, including Yin Yue (殷悦) for the first interview group, and Ye Mengyu (叶濛雨) for the remaining eight groups.

== Results ==
Placement	Contestant
Miss Grand China 2024	Guilin – Sun Zhongyi
1st runner-up	Hangzhou – Jin Mei
2nd runner-up	Guangzhou – Liu Yiping
3rd runner-up	Beijing – Guo Xuanmeng
4th runner-up	Hefei – Wu Yuman
Top 10	Suzhou – Yao Yifei; Shanghai – Lu Xinyue; Guangzhou – Liu Jiayu; Chengdu – Lei Mingxin (雷鸣鑫); Chengdu – Wang Dandan
Top 16	Nanchong – Pupe （张丹煜）; Yueyang – Yan Hong; Guangzhou – Liang Yiying; Guilin – Tian Meng (田梦); Guilin – Wang Xinyi; Shanghai – Zhuang Weiqiao (Note: Withdrew)
Special awards
Brand Ambassador	Guangzhou – Liu Yiping
Miss Popular	Guilin – Sun Zhongyi
Best Popularity	Guilin – Sun Zhongyi
Best Potential	Chengdu – Lei Mingxin
Best Photogenic	Hangzhou – Jin Mei
Best Performance	Guilin – Tian Meng
Best Charisma	Beijing – Guo Xuanmeng
Best Talent	Yueyang – Yan Hong

== Contestants ==
The following eighty-six contestants qualified for the preliminary interview round, and only sixteen were chosen to compete in the national finals.

First Group
Second Group
Third Group
- Xiong Ziyan （熊紫言）
- Li Yunxi (黎云熙）
- Li Yuqing （李雨情）
- Zhang Danyu （张丹煜）
- Zhang Jingwen （张竞文）
- Gegen Zhaole （格根照乐）
- Zhang Rou （张柔）
- Yi Lu （易路）
- Jin Ziying （金子樱）
- Fan Linge （范琳格）
- Lu Yanan （陆雅楠）
- Su Yishan （苏乙删）
- Yang Wanting （杨琬婷）
- Li Rong （李蓉）
- Wang Xiangting （王湘婷）
- Xiao Yadan （肖雅丹）
- Jin Mei （金味）
- Yao Peiyu （姚沛宇）
- Xu yang （徐杨）
- Huang Xinwei （黄馨唯）
- Zhou Xiaoqin （周晓芹）
- Cai Xinlan （蔡欣兰）
- Ahelibaike-Maerjiang （玛儿江-阿合丽拜克）
Fourth Group
Fifth Group
Sixth Group
- Liu Na (刘娜)
- Hu Zixuan (胡梓瑄)
- Chen Ke (陈柯)
- Chen Ke (陈柯)
- Han Haoyu (韩浩宇)
- Shao Mingjie (邵明杰)
- Wu Yinghan (吴颖涵)
- Dai Yusin (代羽昕)
- Zhuang Weiqiao (庄为乔)
- Lei Mingxin (雷鸣鑫)
- Kou Anqi (寇安琪)
- Hele Shiha (赫勒拾哈)
- Coco
- Qian Qiuyi (钱秋伊)
- Song Chan (宋婵)
- Zhang Jiayi (张嘉仪)
- Zhang Rui (张蕊)
- Liu Yang (刘洋)
- Zhang Manyu (张曼雨)
- Han Milan (韩米兰)
- Chen Xiaocao (陈小草)
- Liu Xuantong (刘轩彤)
- Li Yilei (李怡蕾)
- He Yue (何月)
- Qiu Xiaomei (邱小妹)
- Sun Zhongyi (孙中艺)
- Xu Jingyi (徐静怡)
- Bai Lituzi Ayi (由丽吐孜阿依)
- Xue Danling (薛丹玲)
- Li Qian (薛丹玲)
Seventh Group
Eighth Group
Ninth Group
- Kou Zihan (寇子涵)
- Tan Xiao (谭笑)
- Mang Mang (芒芒)
- Qi Yuxian (戚宇贤)
- Tang Yiyi (汤一一）
- Xu Ruotong (徐若彤)
- Yi Ru (易如)
- Yuan Yuan (媛媛)
- Bao Ruoyu (保若玉)
- Shi Bohan (石博涵)
- Cai Jian (蔡健)
- Li Yitong (李依桐)
- Lin Huan (林欢)
- Li Yixuan (李怡璇)
- Han Jiali (韩佳利)
- Zhou Caixia (周彩霞)
- Zhang Yao (章瑶)
- Tian Meng (田梦)
- Song Lianlian (宋恋恋)
- Peng Siyi (彭思逸)
- Chen Wen (杜媛媛)
- Xu Yongxin (许咏昕)
- Ye Qian (叶倩)
- Teri Gela (特日格乐)
- Wang Bing (王冰)
- Ma Cunli (马存利)
- Jiang Jiaxuan (姜佳旋)
- Chen Wen (陈文)
- Chen Li (陈莉)
- Wei Zeru (魏泽如)
- Wang Yutong (王雨桐)
- Aria
- Xu Weizhe (徐伟哲)
