= Miss Saint Lucia World =

Beauty pageant

- Formation: 1975; 51 years ago
- Type: Beauty pageant
- Headquarters: Castries
- Location: Saint Lucia
- Members: Miss World
- Official languages: English

Miss Saint Lucia World is a national beauty pageant in Saint Lucia where the winner is sent to Miss World.

== History ==
Saint Lucia debut in Miss World back 1977 and 1st titleholder was Sophia St. Omer who represented Saint Lucia at Miss World 1975 where she placed Top 15.

== Titleholders ==
=== Miss World Saint Lucia ===
- : Declared as Winner
- : Ended as runner-up or top 5/6 qualification
- : Ended as one of the finalists or semi-finalists
- : Ended as special awards winner

| Year | District | Miss Saint Lucia | Placement at Miss World | Special Awards | Notes |
|---|---|---|---|---|---|
| 2021 | Castries | Tyler Theophane | Unplaced | | |
| 2016 | Castries | La Toya Moffat | Unplaced | | |
| 2010 | Gros Islet | Aiasha Gustave | Top 25 | Miss World Caribbean | |
| 2008 | Castries | Joy-Ann Biscette | Unplaced | | |
| 2006 | Marchand | Tamalisa Baptiste | Unplaced | | |
| 2005 | Castries | Joy Matty | Unplaced | | |
| 2004 | Castries | Sascha Andrew-Rose | Unplaced | | |
| 1994 | Castries | Yasmine Lyndell Walcott | Unplaced | | |
| 1975 | Castries | Sophia St. Omer | Top 15 | | |
