= Pamela Uba =

Nigerian-Irish scientist and Miss Ireland 2021

- Born: 28 November 1995 (age 30); South Africa
- Occupations: Scientist, model, Miss Ireland
- Known for: first black woman chosen to represent Ireland for the Miss World 2022 competition
- Beauty pageant titleholder
- Title: Miss Ireland 2021
- Major competitions: Miss Ireland 2021 (Winner); Miss World 2021 (Top 40)

Pamela Uba is a Nigerian-Irish scientist, model and beauty pageant titleholder. She grew up in Ballyhaunis, County Mayo. As Miss Ireland 2021, she was selected to represent Ireland in the Miss World 2022 beauty pageant. Uba is the first black woman to win the Miss Ireland competition and represent Ireland for the Miss World competition.

== Background ==
Pamela Uba was born in 1995 in South Africa to Nigerian parents. She moved from Johannesburg to Ireland with her family as an asylum seeker when she was 8 years old. Uba spent 10 years in direct provision. She has since raised money for educational support for children in direct provision. Uba played Gaelic football as a centre back. She is a Gaelic Athletic Association fan, supporting her home county of Mayo. Singing is one of her passions and Uba has sung in numerous competitions including teen idol Dublin while recently recording two cover songs as part of her talent pieces for Miss World.

== Career ==
Uba earned her undergraduate degree in medical science at Galway-Mayo Institute of Technology, before graduating with a Master's degree in clinical chemistry from Trinity College Dublin. She works as a medical scientist at University Hospital Galway.

== Modelling and pageantry ==
In 2019, Uba won the Ladies Day prize at the Galway Races. In 2021, Uba won the Miss Ireland title. The 26 year old Miss Galway claimed the national title ahead of 29 other contestants at the Miss Ireland final, which took place in Cavan. She was crowned by three former titleholders. Uba is the first black woman to represent Ireland for the Miss World competition. After winning the Miss Ireland title Uba was "trollled and bullied online", but was also "overwhelmed with the support" of most people. Having herself grown up in direct provision, in October 2021 she became an ambassador for Dídean, "a social enterprise which provides alternative housing for residents in Direct Provision". Uba works as a part-time model (as well as working as a medical scientist at University Hospital Galway). Uba finished in the top 40 of the Miss World 2021 competition.

Awards and achievements
Preceded by Chelsea Farrell	Miss Ireland; 2021	Succeeded by Ivanna McMahon
