= Karolin Kippasto =

Estonian beauty pageant titleholder

- Born: Karolin Kippasto; July 22, 1996 (age 30); Tallinn, Estonia
- Education: University of Tartu
- Height: 1.72 m (5 ft 8 in)
- Beauty pageant titleholder
- Title: Miss Grand International Estonia 2018; Miss Tourism International Estonia 2019; Miss World Estonia 2021; Miss International Estonia 2023; Miss Cosmo Estonia 2025
- Major competitions: Miss Grand International Estonia 2018; (Winner); Miss Grand International 2018; (Unplaced); Miss Tourism International 2019; (Top 10); Miss World Estonia 2021; (Winner); Miss World 2021; (Unplaced); Miss International Estonia 2023; (Winner); Miss International 2023; (Unplaced); Miss Cosmo 2026; (TBD)

Karolin Kippasto (born July 22, 1996) is an Estonian beauty pageant titleholder who has represented Estonia at many pageants including Miss Grand International 2018, Miss World 2021, Miss International 2023. She is the first representative of Estonia at Miss Cosmo 2025. Before that she was in the Top 10 of Miss Tourism International 2019.

== Personal ==
Kippasto is 172 cm tall and speaks Estonian and English. Her hobbies include cycling, choreography and ballet. Her motto in life is "Be the change you want to see in the world".

== Career ==
Kippasto also works as a promoter, dancer, and project manager. In 2023, she began working as a weather forecaster for the Kanal 2 TV news program "Reporter". In 2019, she worked as a stage dancer in China for six months. She is also a volunteer for the Red Cross.

== Pageantry ==
=== Miss Grand International 2018 ===
Kippasto won Miss Grand Estonia 2018 and represented her country at Miss Grand International 2018.

=== Miss Tourism International 2019 ===
She participated in Miss Tourism International 2019 and made it into the Top 10 finalists.

=== Miss World 2021 ===
Kippasto won Miss World Estonia 2021 and then participated in Miss World 2021 and reached the top 32 Miss World Sport.

=== Miss International 2023 ===
Kippasto represented the Estonia at Miss International 2023 and was unplaced.

=== Miss Cosmo 2026 ===
She was appointed as the first Miss Cosmo Estonia and not participate in Miss Cosmo 2025, she able to compete this year at 3rd Miss Cosmo 2026

Awards and achievements
Preceded by Susanna Lehtsalu	Miss Grand Estonia; 2018	Succeeded by Elisse Randmma
Preceded by Kadi Sizask	Miss World Estonia; 2021	Succeeded by Adriana Mass
Preceded by Birgit Konsin	Miss International Estonia; 2023	Succeeded by Incumbent
Preceded by None	Miss Cosmo Estonia; 2025	Succeeded by Incumbent
