= Suy Fatem =

Ivorian model

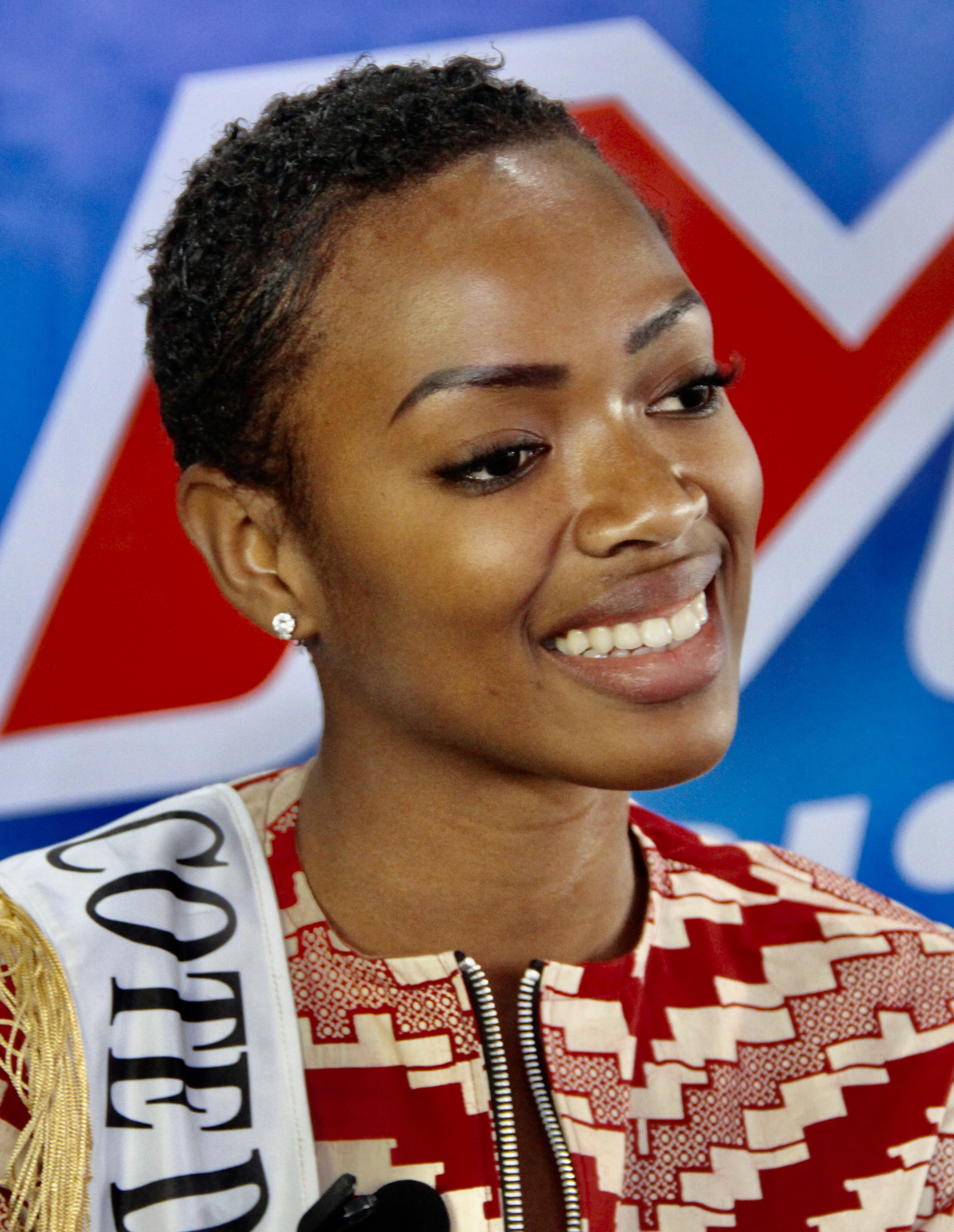
- Born: Suy Tina Marie Danielle Fatem; August 2, 1998 (age 28); Abidjan, Ivory Coast
- Occupations: Model; television personality; businesswoman
- Years active: 2018–present
- Modeling information
- Height: 1.68 m (5 ft 6 in)
- Hair color: Brown
- Eye color: Brown

Suy Fatem (born June 2, 1998) an Ivorian model, personality television winner Miss Côte d'Ivoire in 2018.

== Biography ==
=== Early and education ===
Suy Fatem was born in Abidjan daughter of Appolos Lelou a taekwondo champion. She is a student in 2nd business communication at UCAO.
