= Sinéad Noonan =

Irish former model and actress (born 1987)

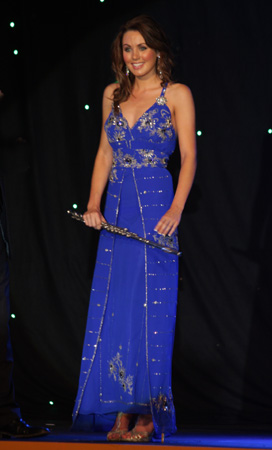
- Born: Sinéad Noonan; 1987 (age 38–39); Dublin, Ireland
- Height: 5 ft 7 in (1.70 m)
- Beauty pageant titleholder
- Title: Miss Ireland 2008

Sinéad Noonan (born 1987) is an Irish actress, former model and beauty pageant titleholder who won Miss Ireland 2008.

Noonan was born in Dublin to Peter and Stephanie Noonan and grew up in Dunboyne, County Meath. She attended St. Peter's College, Dunboyne where she excelled in drama, and now holds a qualification in Speech and Drama, as well as a certificate in Advance Acting.

In 2008, Noonan represented County Meath at Miss Ireland in Dublin, where judges included music manager Louis Walsh, actor Matt Di Angelo, and former Miss Ireland Pamela Flood, and emerged winner. Her victory enabled her to represent Ireland at Miss World 2008 where she made the top ten in the talent competition.

Noonan, who appeared in several plays and short films, cited Halle Berry as her role model, and originally planned to open a Drama school and become an actress, but later launched a modelling career. Represented by Compton Model Agency and Assets, Noonan became the face of Lipsey's Autumn/Winter 2008 collection and Gillian Hughes hats. In 2009, Noonan told the Sunday Mirror she would welcome offers to pose nude, provided it was tasteful.

Noonan has lived in Dubai while working for the airline Emirates and has also lived in London. Noonan has since retired from modelling, and currently resides in Ireland where she is a mother of one.
