= Olivia Yacé =

Ivorian beauty queen

Olivia Manuela Yacé
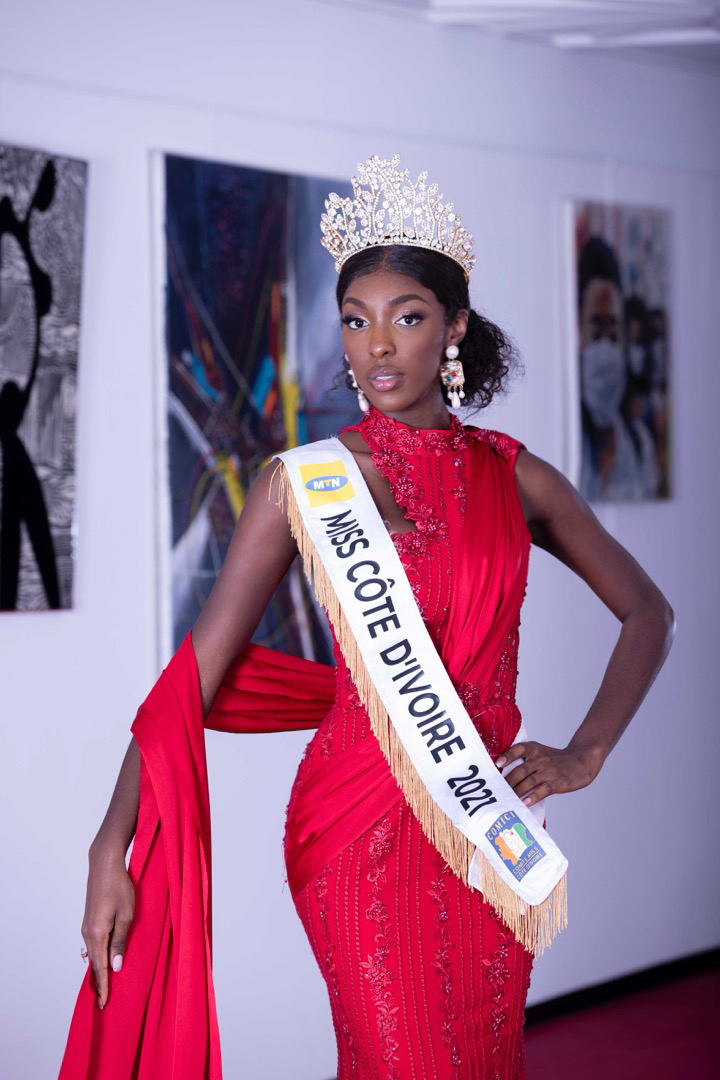
- Yacé in 2021
- Born: Abidjan, Ivory Coast
- Education: Widener University; Richmond American University London
- Beauty pageant titleholder
- Title: Miss Côte d'Ivoire 2021; Miss World Africa 2021; Miss Universe Côte d'Ivoire 2025
- Major competitions: Miss Côte d'Ivoire 2021; (Winner); Miss World 2021; (2nd Runner-Up); Miss Universe 2025; (4th Runner-Up)

Olivia Manuela Yacé is an Ivorian beauty pageant titleholder, who won Miss Côte d'Ivoire 2021. She represented her country at Miss World 2021, and was second runner-up, and also won the continental title Miss World Africa. She later competed in Miss Universe 2025, where she was fourth runner-up.

== Early life and education ==
On 2 June 2022, Yacé became one of the official tourism ambassadors for Côte d’Ivoire. She continued her studies at the Richmond American University in London, where she earned a Master’s degree in Luxury Marketing in June 2024.

== Pageantry ==
=== Miss Côte d'Ivoire 2021 ===
In 2021, Yacé competed in and won Miss Côte d'Ivoire against 23 contestants, on 4 September 2021, at the Sofitel Hôtel Ivoire Congress Palace in Abidjan. She had been pre-selected on 8 May 2021 in Yamoussoukro, in the Bélier region. Following the pre-selection, she was crowned Miss Côte d'Ivoire on

=== Miss World 2021 ===
Yacé was second runner-up at Miss World 2021, on 16 March 2022, and was awarded the title of Miss World Africa. During the competition she also won the Top Model, Head-to-Head Challenge, and the Multimedia challenges. She was first runner-up in the Designer Award and reached the top 27 for Talent.

=== Miss Universe 2025 ===
On 23 July 2025, the Miss Côte d'Ivoire Committee announced that Yacé would represent Côte d’Ivoire at Miss Universe 2025.

In November 2025, Yacé was fourth runner-up at the contest in Bangkok, Thailand. She was also awarded the title of Miss Universe Africa & Oceania. Later, she resigned from the title, citing a need to remain true to her values.

Following her resignation, Yacé received media attention after Miss Universe Organization president Raul Rocha claimed in a video that her alleged weak passport contributed to her loss at Miss Universe 2025. This statement sparked backlash among pageant fans, including Guadeloupe’s Ophely Mezino, who publicly supported her.

Awards and achievements
Preceded by Ileana Márquez	Miss Universe 4th Runner-Up; 2025	Succeeded by Incumbent
Preceded by Chidimma Adetshina	Miss Universe Africa & Oceania (Resigned); 2025	Succeeded by Vacant
Preceded by Marie-Emmanuelle Diamala	Miss Universe Côte d'Ivoire; 2025	Succeeded by Incumbent
Preceded by Suman Rao	Miss World 2nd Runner-Up; 2021	Succeeded by Lesego Chombo; Aché Abrahams (Top 4)
Preceded by Nyekachi Douglas	Miss World Africa; 2021	Succeeded by Lesego Chombo
Preceded by Felice Nina Mawualawe	Miss Côte d'Ivoire; 2021	Succeeded by Marlene-Kany Kouassi
