= Niamh Kennedy =

Irish model

- Born: 1995 (age 30–31); Nenagh, County Tipperary, Ireland
- Occupations: Model, Miss Ireland

Niamh Kennedy (born November 1995) is an Irish fashion model and beauty pageant titleholder who was crowned Miss Ireland 2016 and represented her country at Miss World 2016.

== Career ==
Before her modeling career, Kennedy worked as a waitress and was a classically trained ballerina.

In 2016 Kennedy was crowned Miss Ireland. She went on to represent Ireland at the Miss World competition, where she ended up unplaced.

Since winning Miss Ireland, Kennedy returned to education at Maynooth University to study a degree in International Finance and Economics.

== Personal life ==
Kennedy is a member of the Alzheimer Society of Ireland due to her father being diagnosed when she was 5 and eventually succumbing to the disease.
