= Miss World 2021 =

70th edition of beauty pageant

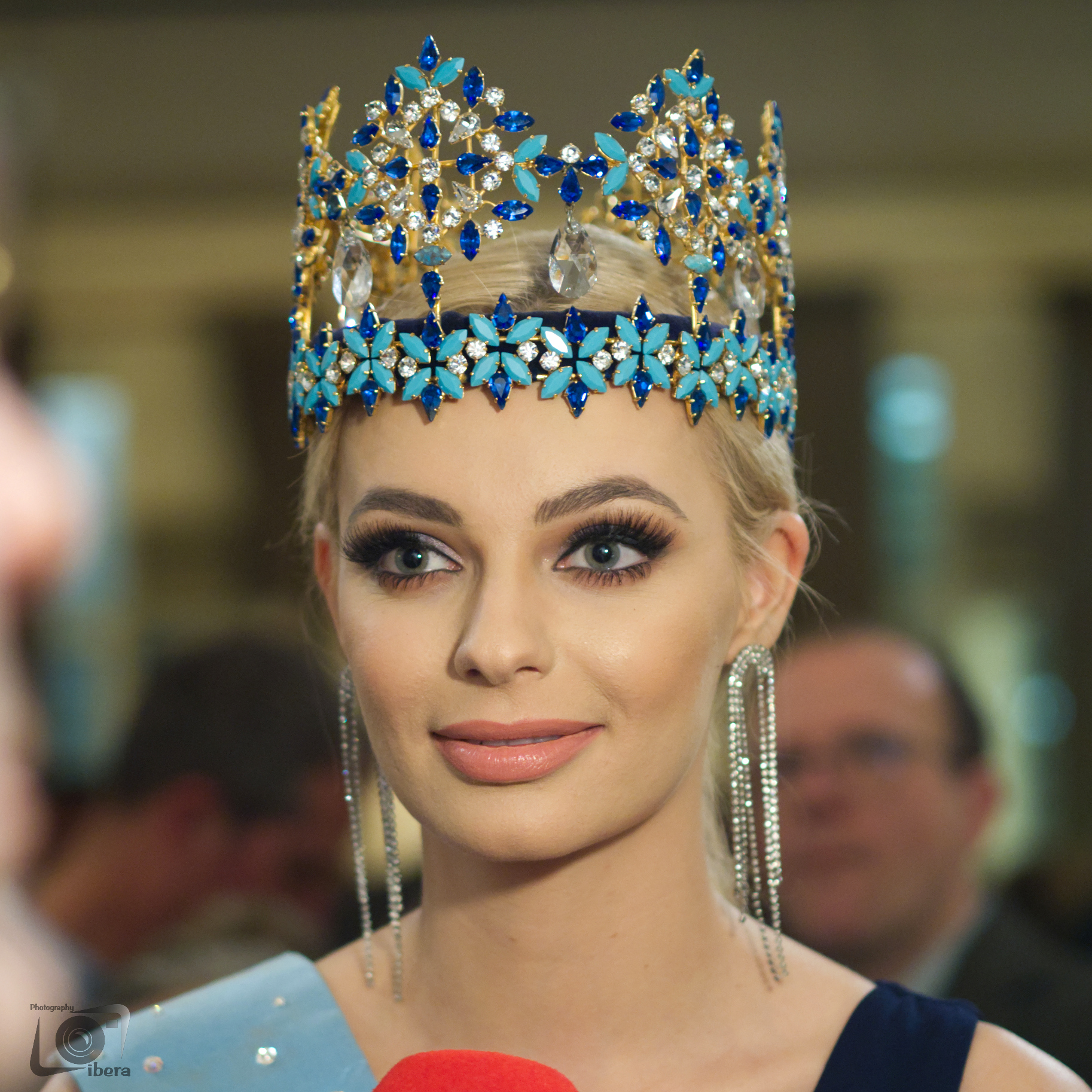
- Karolina Bielawska, Miss World 2021
- Date: 16 March 2022 (Note: The event was televised live at 20:00 Atlantic Standard Time (UTC-04:00). The rest of Africa, Asia, Europe and Western Oceania was on 17 March 2022. The UTC time was 00:00.)
- Presenters: Peter Andre; Fernando Allende
- Entertainment: Don Omar; Gente de Zona; Víctor Manuelle; Pedro Capó; Puerto Rico Philharmonic Orchestra
- Venue: Coca-Cola Music Hall, San Juan, Puerto Rico
- Broadcaster: Reelz; London Live; Univision
- Entrants: 97
- Placements: 40
- Debuts: Iraq; Somalia
- Withdrawals: Antigua and Barbuda; Aruba; Australia; Bangladesh; Barbados; Belarus; British Virgin Islands; Cook Islands; Croatia; Denmark; Ethiopia; Georgia; Greece; Guatemala; Guyana; Hong Kong; Kazakhstan; Kyrgyzstan; Laos; Montenegro; Myanmar; New Zealand; Russia; Samoa; Sierra Leone; South Sudan; Thailand; United States Virgin Islands
- Returns: Belize; Cameroon; Côte d'Ivoire; Estonia; Guinea; Madagascar; Namibia; Norway; Saint Lucia; Serbia; Sint Maarten; Uruguay
- Winner: Karolina Bielawska; Poland

Miss World 2021 was the 70th edition of the Miss World pageant, held at the Coca-Cola Music Hall in San Juan, Puerto Rico, on 16 March 2022. The coronation was originally scheduled to be held on 16 December 2021 at the José Miguel Agrelot Coliseum. However, the pageant was rescheduled to 16 March 2022 due to the COVID-19 outbreak in Puerto Rico.

At the end of the event, Karolina Bielawska of Poland was crowned as Miss World 2021 by Toni-Ann Singh of Jamaica. It is the second victory of Poland in the history of the pageant.

Contestants from ninety-seven countries and territories competed in the pageant, featuring the smallest number of candidates at the pageant since 2003. The pageant was hosted by Peter Andre and Fernando Allende. Don Omar, Gente de Zona, Víctor Manuelle, Pedro Capó, and the Puerto Rico Philharmonic Orchestra (Filarmónica de Puerto Rico) conducted by Angel Velez with guest conductor Mike Dixon performed.

== Background ==
=== Location and date ===
The edition was initially set at the end of 2020 but was postponed indefinitely due to the global COVID-19 pandemic. On 29 July 2020, the Miss World Organization announced that the 70th Miss World will take place at the end of 2021.

On 8 March 2021, the Miss World Organization confirmed that the competition will take place at the Coca-Cola Music Hall in San Juan, Puerto Rico on 16 December 2021. However, due to high demands of tickets for the final competition, the Organization announced on 2 September that the competition would be relocated to the José Miguel Agrelot Coliseum, the largest indoor venue in Puerto Rico.

The threat of the Omicron variant had already detected in some parts of the world during the pre-pageant activities, as the disease started to ravage and swept across the island. On 14 December Miss World Indonesia Pricilia Carla Yules tested positive for COVID-19. As a precaution, her roommate Miss World India Manasa Varanasi and five others were classified as suspected cases. Miss World Organization chairwoman Julia Morley confirmed that the delegates are currently isolated and in quarantine and that they will not be on stage for the final show if they do not produce a negative PCR test. On 15 December, Puerto Rico Department of Health confirmed that 17 positive cases for COVID-19 related to the Miss World pageant activities, includes contestants and technical personnel.

An official statement stating that Miss World Malaysia Lavanya Sivaji tested positive for COVID-19 by her national director via Miss World Malaysia Instagram on 16 December 2021. She was required to be isolated for 10 days and will not be permitted on the stage during the finals as part of Puerto Rico Department of Health and Miss World guidelines. The finale, originally slated 16 December, was later postponed and will be held on an unspecified date but within 90 days in Puerto Rico. On 16 December, epidemiologist Melissa Marzán confirmed that 15 staff and 23 contestants were positive cases associated with Miss World during the Puerto Rico Department of Health press conference. She added that pageant organizers decided to postpone, not the island's authorities.

On 22 December, the Miss World Organization announced via the Miss World social media accounts that the rescheduled 70th Miss World pageant would take place on 16 March 2022 and would be held at Puerto Rico's Coca-Cola Music Hall instead of the José Miguel Agrelot Coliseum. Only the 40 semifinalists had returned to Puerto Rico from 9 to 11 March 2022 for the rescheduled event.

=== Selection of participants ===
Contestants from ninety-seven countries and territories were selected to compete in the competition. Due to the pandemic, numerous national pageants were postponed or canceled entirely, resulting in multiple former runners-up from previous national pageants being appointed, or casting processes taking place instead. Eight of these delegates were designees after the original contestant withdrew or elapsed her reign.

==== Replacements ====
Andrea Montero, Miss World Costa Rica 2020, was expected to represent Costa Rica at Miss World. However, due to the COVID-19 pandemic, Montero elapsed her reign as Miss World Costa Rica, making her no longer eligible to compete. Due to this, Tamara Dal Maso was appointed as Miss World Costa Rica 2021. The same happened with Miss World America 2020 Alissa Anderegg, where she was replaced by Miss World America 2021 Shree Saini, a semi-finalist at Miss World America 2020, Miss World Japan 2020 Maria Kaneya, where she was replaced by Miss World Japan 2021 Tamaki Koshi, Miss Rwanda 2020 Nishimwe Naomie Mäckenzie, where she was replaced by Miss Rwanda 2021 Grace Ingabire, and Miss Senegal 2020 Ndeye Fatima Dione, where she was replaced by Miss Senegal 2021 Penda Sy.

Amela Agastra was appointed as the representative of Albania after Joanna Kiose, Miss World Albania 2021, withdrew due to undisclosed reasons. Lizzy Dobbe, the first runner-up of Miss World Netherlands 2020-2021, was appointed to represent the Netherlands since Dilay Willemstein, Miss World Netherlands 2020-2021, refused to be vaccinated against COVID-19. Juliana Rugumisa was appointed as the representative of Tanzania after Miss Tanzania 2020/2021 Rose David Manfere breached her contract with Miss Tanzania.

==== Debuts, returns, and withdrawals ====
The 2021 edition saw the debuts of Iraq and Somalia, and the returns of Belize, Cameroon, Côte d'Ivoire, Estonia, Guinea, Madagascar, Namibia, Norway, Saint Lucia, Serbia, Sint Maarten, and Uruguay. Sint Maarten last competed in 2001, Estonia last competed in 2007, Namibia last competed in 2015, Saint Lucia last competed in 2016, Côte d'Iviore, Guinea and Uruguay last competed in 2017 and Belize, Cameroon, Madagascar, Norway and Serbia last competed in 2018. Antigua and Barbuda, Aruba, Australia, Bangladesh, Barbados, Belarus, the British Virgin Islands, Cook Islands, Croatia, Denmark, Ethiopia, Georgia, Greece, Guatemala, Guyana, Hong Kong, Kazakhstan, Kyrgyzstan, Laos, Montenegro, Myanmar, New Zealand, Russia, Samoa, Sierra Leone, South Sudan, Thailand, and the United States Virgin Islands withdrew. Both Darya Goncharevich of Belarus and Natalija Labović of Montenegro withdrew due to health concerns. Star Hellas 2021 Anna Pavlidou of Greece withdrew after not getting the second dose for the COVID-19 vaccine. Michelle Calderon of Guatemala, Nazerke Karmanova of Kazakhstan, and Adesha Penn of the United States Virgin Islands withdrew due to undisclosed reasons.

==== Participation of Miss Sint Maarten ====
On 15 December, the government of Sint Maarten officially denounced the participation of Lara Mateo at Miss World 2021 as Dutch territory representative. The current franchise holder of the Miss and Mr World license for Sint Maarten did not select Lara Mateo for her participation; they are currently under investigation by the government. Prime Minister Silveria Jacobs said the government discovered that Lara Mateo was wrong registered by Guadeloupe's franchise holder to represent Sint Maarten. The local government issued an official letter stating that they did not endorse Lara Mateo to Miss World. She added that Collectivity of Saint Martin, neither their Tourism Department nor the Culture Department, did not know or acknowledge the candidate and reassured that their winners would solely compete at Miss France.

=== Incidents before the pageant ===
On 28 February 2022, Stephanie Del Valle took to Instagram to announce she would no longer be hosting the pageant's 70th edition, claiming "It is contrary to my ethics and moral principles to continue working with an organization that has acted in a defamatory, frivolous and unfair manner; solely for the purpose of causing harm." Puerto Rico with a Purpose's lawsuit against Del Valle and Del Valle's countersuit are still active.

== Results ==
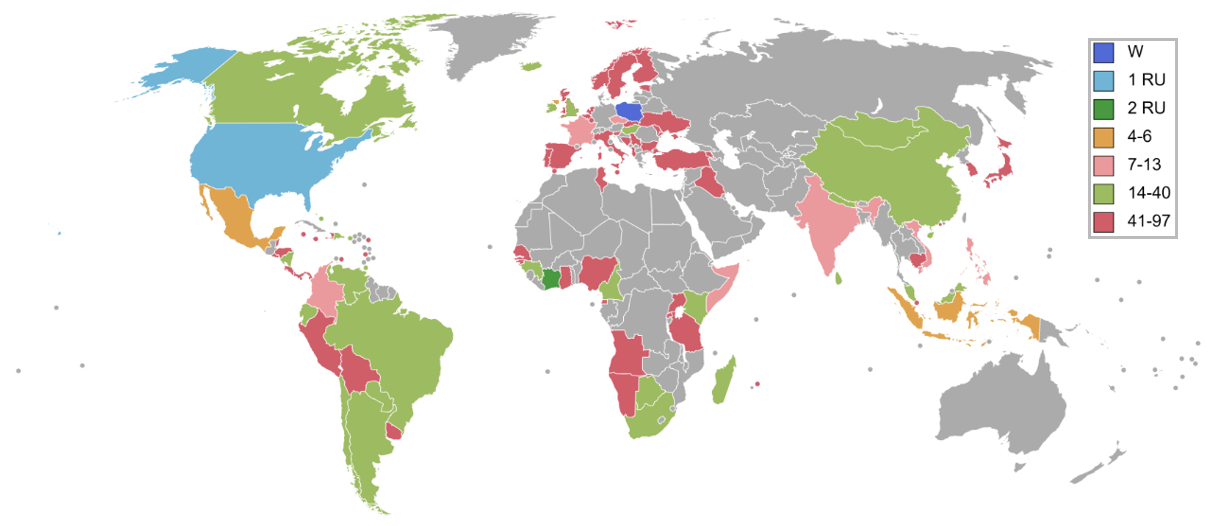
Miss World 2021 participating countries and territories

=== Placements ===
Placement	Contestant
Miss World 2021	Poland – Karolina Bielawska
1st Runner-Up	United States – Shree Saini
2nd Runner-Up	Côte d'Ivoire – Olivia Yacé
Top 6	Indonesia – Pricilia Carla Yules; Mexico – Karolina Vidales; Northern Ireland – Anna Leitch
Top 13	Colombia – Andrea Aguilera; Czech Republic – Karolína Kopíncová; France – April Benayoum; India – Manasa Varanasi; Philippines – Tracy Perez; Somalia – Khadija Omar; Vietnam – Hà Đỗ §
Top 40	Argentina – Amira Hidalgo; Bahamas – Sienna Evans; Botswana – Palesa Mofele; Brazil – Caroline Teixeira; Cameroon – Audrey Monkam; Canada – Svetlana Mamaeva; Chile – Carol Drpic; China – Siqi Jiang; Dominican Republic – Emmy Peña; Ecuador – Ámar Pacheco; England – Rehema Muthamia; Guinea – Nene Bah; Hungary – Lili Tótpeti; Iceland – Hugrún Birta Egilsdóttir; Ireland – Pamela Uba; Kenya – Sharon Obara; Madagascar – Nellie Anjaratiana; Malaysia – Lavanya Sivaji; Mongolia – Burte-Ujin Anu; Nepal – Namrata Shrestha; Nicaragua – Sheynnis Palacios; Paraguay – Bethania Borba; Puerto Rico – Aryam Díaz; South Africa – Shudufhadzo Musida; Sri Lanka – Sadé Greenwood; Trinidad and Tobago – Jeanine Brandt; Venezuela – Alejandra Conde

§ – Digital Media Challenge winner

==== Continental Queens of Beauty ====
Continental Group	Contestant
Africa	Côte d'Ivoire – Olivia Yacé
Americas	United States – Shree Saini
Asia	Indonesia – Pricilia Carla Yules
Caribbean	Dominican Republic – Emmy Peña
Europe	Northern Ireland – Anna Leitch

== Challenge Events ==
=== Head-to-Head Challenge ===
The contestants were officially assigned to their grouping via Miss World YouTube Channel on 24 November 2021. The winner of each group will compete at the head-to-head final in the Capitol of Puerto Rico on 9 December. The eight semi-finalists who won at the second round will automatically be part of the Top 40.

==== Round 1 ====
- Advanced to Round 2 of the Head-to-Head Challenge.
- Advanced to Round 2 of the Head-to-Head Challenge, but advanced to the Top 40 via judges' choice or a challenge event other than Head-to-Head Challenge.
- Advanced to the Top 40 via a challenge event other than Head-to-Head Challenge.
- Advanced to the Top 40 via judges' choice.

Group	Country 1	Country 2	Country 3	Country 4	Country 5	Country 6
1	Bahamas	Malaysia	Nepal	Peru	Portugal	United States
2	Albania	El Salvador	England	Indonesia	Mauritius	South Africa
3	Dominican Republic	Namibia	Paraguay	Singapore	Slovakia	Uruguay
4	Cayman Islands	Honduras	Poland	Scotland	Serbia	Sri Lanka
5	Angola	Bolivia	Japan	Sweden	Ukraine	Venezuela
6	Belize	Guadeloupe	Kenya	Norway	Trinidad and Tobago	Turkey
7	Argentina	Czech Republic	Equatorial Guinea	Jamaica	Mongolia	Netherlands
8	Botswana	Estonia	Iceland	Italy	Saint Lucia	Tunisia
9	Bosnia and Herzegovina	Brazil	Bulgaria	Moldova	Vietnam	Wales
10	Cameroon	Chile	Ecuador	Luxembourg	Madagascar	Northern Ireland
11	France	Gibraltar	Macau	Philippines	Puerto Rico	Slovenia
12	South Korea	Malta	Mexico	Nigeria	Panama	Spain
13	Belgium	Colombia	Curaçao	Finland	Ireland	Rwanda
14	Canada	Costa Rica	Côte d'Ivoire	Guinea	Hungary	India
15	Armenia	China	Guinea-Bissau	Iraq	Nicaragua	Somalia
16	Cambodia	Ghana	Haiti	Senegal	Sint Maarten	Uganda

- Note: Tanzania wasn't assigned to any group for the Head-to-Head challenge.

==== Round 2 ====
- Advanced to the Top 40 via the Head-to-Head challenge.

Group	Country 1	Country 2
1	Nepal	Indonesia
2	Paraguay	Cayman Islands
3	Venezuela	Trinidad and Tobago
4	Mongolia	Botswana
5	Vietnam	Cameroon
6	Philippines	Mexico
7	Colombia	Côte d'Ivoire
8	Nicaragua	Haiti

=== Talent ===
The finals of the Talent competition was held on 4 December 2021, and the winner was officially announced via the Miss World Facebook page on 13 December 2021. The candidate who won the challenge will be included in the Top 40 and will compete at the finale on 16 March 2022. Burte-Ujin Anu of Mongolia won the challenge.

- Advanced to the Top 40 via the Talent challenge.

Placement	Contestant
Winner	Mongolia – Burte-Ujin Anu
1st runner-up	Norway – Amine Storrød
2nd runner-up	Japan – Tamaki Hoshi
3rd runner-up	Chile – Carol Drpic
4th runner-up	Northern Ireland – Anna Leitch
Top 27	Albania – Amela Agastra; Botswana – Palesa Molefe; Bulgaria – Eva Dobreva; Côte d'Ivoire – Olivia Yacé; Ecuador – Ámar Pacheco; England – Rehema Muthamia; Gibraltar – Janice Sampere; India – Manasa Varanasi; Indonesia – Pricilia Carla Yules; Ireland – Pamela Uba; Jamaica – Khalia Hall; Kenya – Sharon Obara; Mauritius – Angélique Sanson; Scotland – Claudia Todd; Singapore – Khai Ling Ho; Slovenia – Maja Čolić; South Africa – Shudufhadzo Musida; South Korea – Tara Hong; Tunisia – Amani Layouni; United States – Shree Saini; Uruguay – Valentina Camejo; Vietnam – Hà Đỗ

=== Top Model ===
The finals of the Top Model competition was held at the T-Mobile Distrito on 6 December 2021, and the winner was officially announced via the Miss World Facebook page on 13 December 2021. The candidate who won the challenge will be included in the Top 40 and will compete at the finale on 16 March 2022. Olivia Yacé of Côte d'Ivoire won the challenge.

- Advanced to the Top 40 via the Top Model challenge.

Placement	Contestant
Winner	Côte d'Ivoire – Olivia Yacé
1st runner-up	Cameroon – Audrey Monkam
2nd runner-up	Puerto Rico – Aryam Díaz
Top 13	Bahamas – Sienna Evans; Czech Republic – Karolína Kopíncová; Dominican Republic – Emmy Pena; France – April Benayoum; Kenya – Sharon Obara; Mexico – Karolina Vidales; Nicaragua – Sheynnis Palacios; Poland – Karolina Bielawska; Venezuela – Alejandra Conde; Vietnam – Hà Đỗ

==== Best Designer Dress ====
Placement	Contestant
Winner	South Korea – Tara Hong
1st runner-up	Côte d'Ivoire – Olivia Yacé
2nd runner-up	Iraq – Maria Farhad

=== Sports ===
The Sports Challenge was initially held on 1 December 2021, but Miss Norway, Amine Storrød, had an asthma attack during the event, which delayed the rest of the competition. The finals of the challenge was held on 10 December 2021, and the winner was officially announced via the Miss World Facebook page on 13 December 2021. The candidate who won the challenge will be included in the Top 40 and will compete at the finale on 16 March 2022. Karolina Vidales of Mexico won the challenge.

- Advanced to the Top 40 via the Sports challenge.

Placement	Contestant
Winner	Mexico – Karolina Vidales
1st runner-up	Iceland – Hugrún Birta Egilsdóttir
2nd runner-up	Guinea-Bissau – Itchacénia da Costa; Ireland – Pamela Uba (tie)

=== Multimedia ===
The winner of the Multimedia Challenge was officially announced via the Miss World Facebook page on 13 December 2021. The candidate who won the challenge will be included in the Top 40 and will compete at the finale on 16 March 2022. Olivia Yacé of Côte d'Ivoire won the challenge.

- Advanced to the Top 40 via the Multimedia challenge.

Placement	Contestant
Winner	Côte d'Ivoire – Olivia Yacé
Top 10	Botswana – Palesa Molefe; Cameroon – Audrey Monkam; Colombia – Andrea Aguilera; Guinea – Nene Bah; Indonesia - Pricilia Carla Yules; Mexico – Karolina Vidales; Nepal – Namrata Shrestha; South Africa – Shudufhadzo Musida; Venezuela – Alejandra Conde

=== Beauty With a Purpose ===
The finalists of the Beauty With a Purpose was officially announced via the Miss World Facebook page on 13 December 2021. The six finalists were then announced as winners and are included in the Top 40 and will compete at the finale on 16 March 2022. Aside from that, a Beauty With a Purpose Ambassador Award was given during the finale to a candidate that will accompany the new Miss World with her reign.

- Advanced to the Top 40 via Beauty With a Purpose.

Placement	Contestant
Winner	United States – Shree Saini §
Top 6	England – Rehema Muthamia; India – Manasa Varanasi; Kenya – Sharon Obara; Philippines – Tracy Perez; South Africa – Shudufhadzo Musida
Top 10	Czech Republic – Karolína Kopíncová; Madagascar – Nellie Anjaratiana; Nepal – Namrata Shrestha; Sri Lanka – Sadé Greenwood
Top 28	Bahamas – Sienna Evans; Brazil – Caroline Teixeira; Cameroon – Audrey Monkam; Canada – Svetlana Mamaeva; Chile – Carol Drpic; China – Siqi Jiang; Ecuador – Ámar Pacheco; Guinea – Nene Bah; Hungary – Lili Tótpeti; Indonesia – Pricilia Carla Yules; Ireland – Pamela Uba; Malaysia – Lavanya Sivaji; Mexico – Karolina Vidales; Nicaragua – Sheynnis Palacios; Paraguay – Bethania Borba; Trinidad and Tobago – Jeanine Brandt; Venezuela – Alejandra Conde; Vietnam – Hà Đỗ

§ Beauty With a Purpose Ambassador Award winner

== Pageant ==
=== Format ===
Fifteen contestants earned their spot in the semi-finals via various challenges and the remaining twenty-five semi-finalists were officially announced via Miss World Facebook page on 21 January 2022. There was a tie for the twelve semi-finalists on the coronation night, which increased the placements to thirteen including the Digital Media Challenge Winner. Shree Saini of United States was awarded as Beauty With A Purpose Ambassador and she will accompany the new Miss World, Karolina Bielawska of Poland during her reign.

=== Selection committee ===
- Jacqueline Aguilera – Miss World 1995 from Venezuela
- Stella Nolasco – Puerto Rican fashion designer
- Vanessa Ponce – Miss World 2018 from Mexico
- Brock Pierce – American entrepreneur and cryptocurrency tycoon
- Crystal Rose Pierce – American entrepreneur
- Vincent De Paul – American actor and model
- Julia Morley – Chairman and CEO of the Miss World Organization
- Peter Thomas Roth – CEO and founder of Peter Thomas Roth Skin Care
- Giselle Laronde – Miss World 1986 from Trinidad and Tobago
- Patrick Robinson – American fashion designer
- Mari Allende – Mexican philanthropist and television personality

== Contestants ==
Ninety-seven contestants competed for the title.

Country/Territory	Contestant	Age (Note: Ages at the time of the pageant)	Hometown
Albania	Amela Agastra	18	Tirana
Angola	Ruth Carlos	24	Huambo
Argentina	Amira Hidalgo	23	Buenos Aires
Armenia	Mirna Bzdigian	19	Yerevan
(The Bahamas) Bahamas	Sienna Evans	24	Nassau
Belgium	Céline van Ouytsel	25	Herentals
Belize	Markeisha Young	21	Santa Elena
Bolivia	Alondra Mercado	19	Trinidad
Bosnia and Herzegovina	Adna Biber	19	Sarajevo
Botswana	Palesa Molefe	22	Gaborone
Brazil	Caroline Teixeira	23	Brasília
Bulgaria	Eva Dobreva	21	Varna
Cambodia	Sophorn Phum	19	Takéo
Cameroon	Audrey Monkam	24	Bali Nyonga
Canada	Svetlana Mamaeva	21	Maple
Cayman Islands	Rashana Hydes	24	West Bay
Chile	Carol Drpic	21	Punta Arenas
China	Siqi Jiang	21	Liaoning
Colombia	Andrea Aguilera	23	Medellín
Costa Rica	Tamara Dal Maso	23	Puntarenas
(Ivory Coast) Côte d'Ivoire	Olivia Yacé	23	Yamoussoukro
Curaçao	Alvinette Soliana	20	Willemstad
Czech Republic	Karolína Kopíncová	22	Brno
Dominican Republic	Emmy Peña	24	Duarte
Ecuador	Ámar Pacheco	25	Guayaquil
El Salvador	Nicole Álvarez	27	San Salvador
England	Rehema Muthamia	25	Mill Hill
Equatorial Guinea	Lucila Benita	21	Malabo
Estonia	Karolin Kippasto	24	Tartu
Finland	Emilia Lepomäki	23	Vantaa
France	April Benayoum	22	Éguilles
Ghana	Monique Mawulawe	20	Accra
Gibraltar	Janice Sampere	23	Gibraltar
Guadeloupe	Prescilla Larose	22	Le Moule
Guinea	Nene Bah	24	Conakry
Guinea-Bissau	Itchacénia da Costa	21	Bissau
Haiti	Erlande Berger	24	Port-au-Prince
Honduras	Dayana Bordas	24	Ahuas
Hungary	Lili Tótpeti	20	Nagykanizsa
Iceland	Hugrún Birta Egilsdóttir	22	Reykjavík
India	Manasa Varanasi	24	Hyderabad
Indonesia	Pricilia Carla Yules	25	Surabaya
Iraq	Maria Farhad	20	Mosul
(Republic of Ireland) Ireland	Pamela Uba	25	Galway
Italy	Claudia Motta	21	Velletri
Jamaica	Khalia Hall	25	Saint Ann
Japan	Tamaki Hoshi	20	Tokyo
Kenya	Sharon Obara	19	Nairobi
Luxembourg	Emilie Boland	25	Sandweiler
Macau	Jia Ni Yuan	28	Macau
Madagascar	Nellie Anjaratiana	24	Antananarivo
Malaysia	Lavanya Sivaji	26	Batu Caves
Malta	Naomi Dingli	26	Valletta
Mauritius	Angélique Sanson	25	Curepipe
Mexico	Karolina Vidales	24	Jiquilpan
Moldova	Tatiana Ovcinicova	23	Chișinău
Mongolia	Burte-Ujin Anu	23	Ulan Bator
Namibia	Annerie Maré	26	Kamanjab
Nepal	Namrata Shrestha	24	Kathmandu
Netherlands	Lizzy Dobbe	21	Den Helder
Nicaragua	Sheynnis Palacios	21	Managua
Nigeria	Oluchi Madubuike	25	Abuja
Northern Ireland	Anna Leitch	27	Cookstown
Norway	Amine Storrød	21	Hvaler
Panama	Krysthelle Barretto	25	Panama City
Paraguay	Bethania Borba	20	Presidente Franco
Peru	Paula Montes	25	Lima
Philippines	Tracy Perez	28	Cebu City
Poland	Karolina Bielawska	22	Łódź
Portugal	Lidy Alves	25	Vila Real
Puerto Rico	Aryam Díaz	23	Naranjito
Rwanda	Grace Ingabire	22	Kigali
Saint Lucia	Tyler Theophane	23	Choiseul
Scotland	Claudia Todd	25	Bothwell
Senegal	Penda Sy	24	Tambacounda
Serbia	Andrijana Savić	21	Belgrade
Singapore	Khai Ling Ho	18	Singapore
Sint Maarten	Lara Mateo	24	Marigot
Slovakia	Leona Novoberdaliu	25	Bratislava
Slovenia	Maja Čolić	21	Ribnica
Somalia	Khadija Omar	20	Mogadishu
South Africa	Shudufhadzo Musida	25	Limpopo
South Korea	Tara Hong	21	Seoul
Spain	Ana García	23	Almería
Sri Lanka	Sadé Greenwood	18	Colombo
Sweden	Gabriella Lomm Mann	26	Stockholm
Tanzania	Julianna Rugumisa	23	Kilimanjaro
Trinidad and Tobago	Jeanine Brandt	25	San Fernando
Tunisia	Amani Layouni	22	Mahdia
Turkey	Dílara Korkmaz	23	Ankara
Uganda	Elizabeth Bagaya	26	Bombo
Ukraine	Aleksandra Yaremchuk	22	Vinnytsia
United States	Shree Saini	25	Seattle
Uruguay	Valentina Camejo	24	Montevideo
Venezuela	Alejandra Conde	24	Villa de Cura
Vietnam	Hà Đỗ	20	Thanh Hóa
Wales	Olivia Harris	18	Magor
