= Jiang Siqi =

Chinese model

- 姜思岐
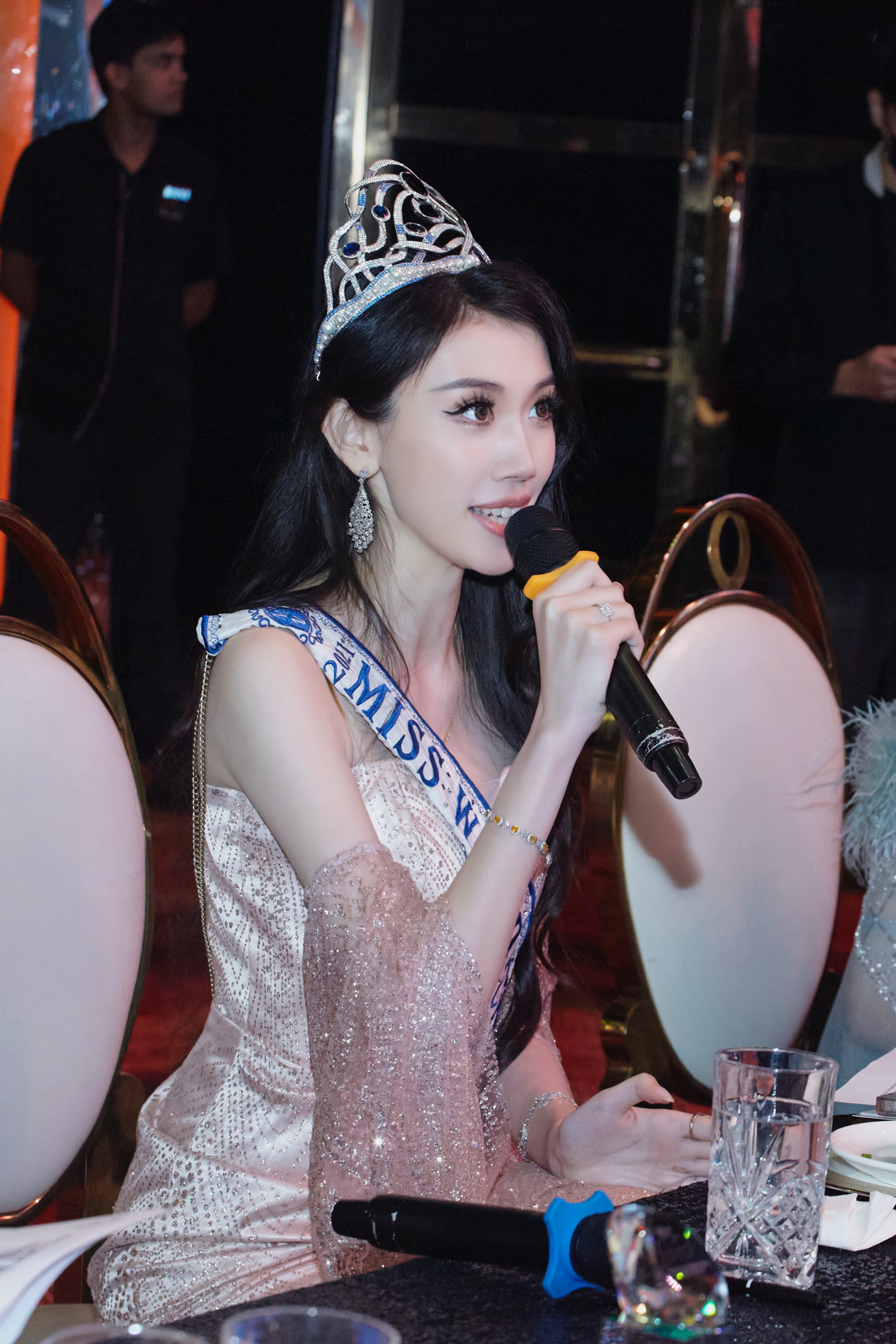
- Born: 24 December 1999 (age 26); Anshan, Liaoning, China
- Height: 177 cm (5 ft 10 in)
- Beauty pageant titleholder
- Title: Miss China World 2021
- Hair color: Black
- Eye color: Brown
- Major competitions: Miss China World 2021; (Winner); Miss World 2021; (Top 40); MGI All Stars 1st Edition; (Unplaced)

Jiang Siqi (Chinese: 姜思岐) is a Chinese model, Media presenter and fashion event director. She has won the Champion of Miss World China 2021–2022 and has succeeded in Chinese and international beauty pageants.

== Early life and education ==
Born in China, Jiang Siqi developed a strong interest in fashion, beauty, and intercultural communication from a young age. She graduated from Central China Normal University with a degree in Computer Science and Technology, where she received a scholarship and was selected to study in United States.

== Career ==
Jiang Siqi gained attention after winning the Miss China World 2021–2022 Champion, which allowed her to represent China in the Miss World competition. She holds several positions in the pageant industry, including being the director of Mister Global in China, Miss Scuba International, and Miss Niseko World, where she is responsible for selecting and training Chinese contestants to showcase their talents on the global stage.

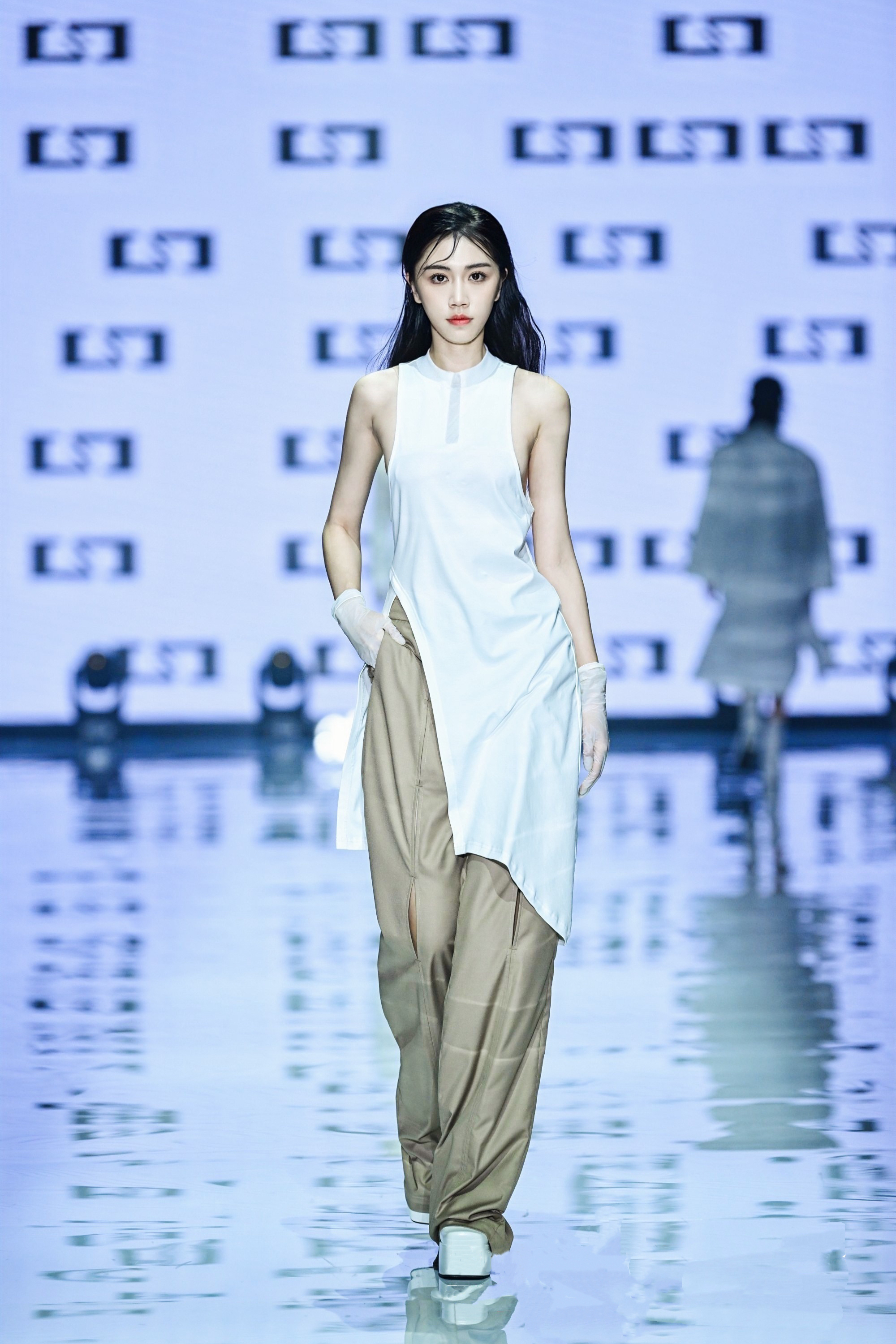
Jiang Siqi Modeling

In addition to her role in pageant competitions, Jiang Siqi actively participates in organizing and promoting various beauty and cultural events. She has served as a guest and judge at beauty pageants, including the 2022 Miss World Macau, the 2022 Mrs. Global Canada Final, and the 2023 Miss China World competition, and is involved in contestant training. Beyond her work in pageant competitions, Jiang Siqi is also involved in fashion and event production.
