= Miss Sint Maarten =

Beauty pageant

Miss Sint Maarten The Sint Maarten Queen Carnival Miss Universe Sint Maarten & Guadeloupe
- Formation: 1976; 50 years ago
- Type: Beauty pageant
- Headquarters: Philipsburg
- Location: Sint Maarten
- Members: Miss World; Miss Universe
- Official language: French; Dutch
- Key people: Minister of Tourism, Economic Affairs, Transport & Telecommunications; Claret Connor (also sponsor in 2015); Benita Mamtora and Rashmi Mirpuri (2014)

Miss Sint Maarten (St. Maarten) is a national beauty pageant that selects queen from Sint Maarten representative to Miss Universe pageant between 1976 and 1982. This pageant is incorporated to Miss St. Martin who selects the winner to Miss France since 2012.

== History ==
The official winner of Miss St. Maarten (Dutch) is expected to go to Miss Caribbean Queen. Between 1976 and 1982 the winners went to Miss Universe and between 1998 and 2001 the constituent country of Sint Maarten sent delegates to Miss World. In 2015 Minister of Tourism, Economic Affairs, Transport & Telecommunications Hon. Claret Connor, is one of the proud sponsors of Miss Sint Maarten 2015/2016.

=== Miss Sint Maarten 2014 ===
Soniya Bag Assumed as Miss Sint Maarten 2014; in 2014 the national pageant was organised in St. Maarten for the first time

=== Sint Maarten participation in Miss World 2021 ===
On December 15, the government of Sint Maarten officially denounced the participation of Lara Mateo at Miss World 2021. The current franchise holder of the Miss and Mr World license for Sint Maarten did not select Lara Mateo for her participation; they are currently under investigation by the government.

Prime Minister Silveria Jacobs said the government discovered that Lara Mateo was registered by Guadeloupe's franchise holder to represent Sint Maarten. Sint Maarten government issued an official letter stating that they did not endorse Lara Mateo to Miss World Limited. She added that Collectivity of Saint Martin, neither their Tourism Department nor the Culture Department, did not know or acknowledge the candidate and reassured that their winners would solely compete at Miss France.

== Titleholders ==
Year	Miss Sint Maarten
1976	Angela Huggins
1977	Marie Madeleine Boirard
1980	Lucie Marie Davic
1982	Liana Elviara Brown
1998	Myrtille Charlotte Brookson (Miss World)
1999	Ifelola Badejo (Miss World)
2000	Angelique Romou (Miss Universe)
2001	Genesis Romney (Miss World)
2006	Gisella Hilliman (Miss Universe)
2011	Trumane Trotman (Senior Carnival Queen)
2012	Glenicia Mitchell (Senior Carnival Queen)
2013	Davinia A Brooks (Senior Carnival Queen)
2015	Phausha Winklaar (Senior Carnival Queen)
2016	Diandra Marlin (Miss Teen Queen)
2017	Shanice Powell (Senior Carnival Queen)

== Sint Maarten at International pageants ==
=== Miss Universe Sint Maarten ===
- : Declared as Winner
- : Ended as runner-up or top 5/6 qualification
- : Ended as one of the finalists or semifinalists
- : Ended as special awards winner

Year	Miss Sint Maarten	Placement at Miss Universe	Special Award(s)	Notes
Did not compete since 2007—present
2006	Gisella Hilliman	Unplaced		
Did not compete between 2003—2005
2002	Bernice Gumbs	Did not compete		
2001	Did not compete			
2000	Angelique Romou	Unplaced		
Did not compete between 1983—1999
1982	Liana Elviara Brown	Unplaced		
1981	Did not compete			
1980	Lucie Marie Davic	Unplaced		
Did not compete between 1978—1979
1977	Marie Madeleine Boirard	Unplaced		
1976	Angela Huggins	Unplaced		

=== Miss World Sint Maarten ===
- : Declared as Winner
- : Ended as runner-up or top 5/6 qualification
- : Ended as one of the finalists or semifinalists
- : Ended as special awards winner

Year	Miss Sint Maarten World	Placement at Miss World	Special Award(s)	Notes
2021	Lara Mateo	Unplaced	Miss World Sport (Top 32)	The government of Sint Maarten officially denounced the participation of Lara Mateo at Miss World 2021.
Did not compete between 2002—2020
2001	Genesis Romney	Unplaced		
2000	Angelique Romou	Did not compete		
1999	Ifiola Badejo	Unplaced		
1998	Myrtille Charlotte Brookson	Unplaced		
