= Miss Ireland =

Beauty contest

- Formation: 1947
- Type: Beauty pageant
- Headquarters: Dublin
- Location: Ireland
- Members: Miss World; Miss Europe; Miss International; Miss Earth; Miss Charm; Miss Cosmo
- Official language: English
- Website: miss-ireland.ie

Miss Ireland is a national Beauty pageant in Ireland. Winners of the competition represent Ireland at Miss World. Among the winners are Rosanna Davison, who went on to win Miss World 2003, and Pamela Uba, who in 2021 became the first black woman to win the Miss Ireland title.

== History ==
The first winner of Miss Ireland was Violet Nolan in 1947. The next winner, Eithne Dunne, came 5 years later in 1952. Thereafter there has been a winner every year except 2020, when the competition was cancelled due to the worldwide COVID-19 pandemic.

In 2003, the winner, Rosanna Davison, went on to win Miss World 2003, becoming the first and only Irish woman to date to achieve this feat.

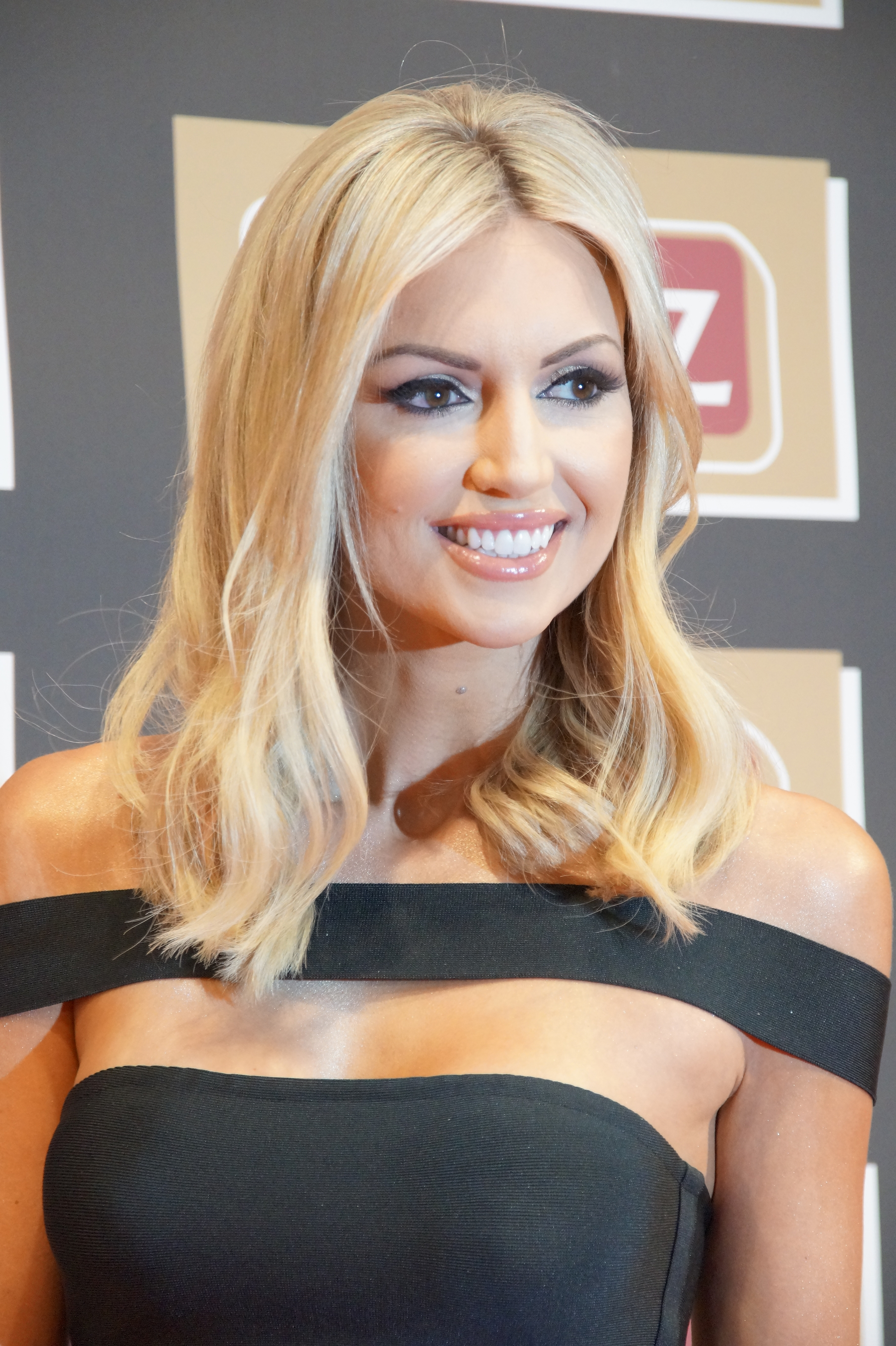
Rosanna Davison, Miss Ireland 2003 and Miss World 2003.

In 2012 the winner Marie Hughes, representing County Mayo, was stripped of her title when it was discovered that she was "too old", as she was aged 25 and would have been 26 at the time of the Miss World competition. She was replaced by the runner-up, Rebecca Maguire, aged 20.

In 2021, following the cancellation of the competition the previous year due to the COVID-19 pandemic, Pamela Uba became the first black woman to win the Miss Ireland title.

== Titleholders ==
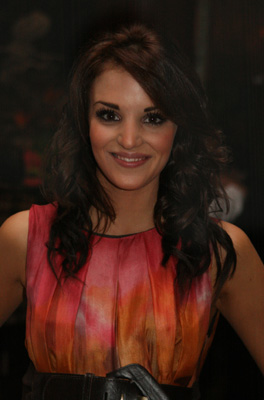
Miss Ireland 2007, Blathnaid McKenna

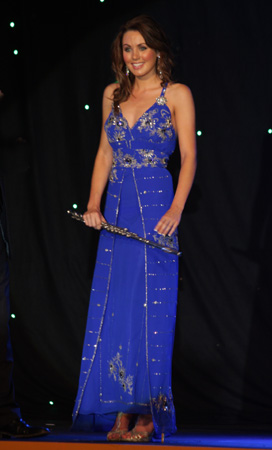
Miss Ireland 2008, Sinéad Noonan

Color key

- Declared as Winner
- Ended as runner-up
- Ended as one of the finalists or semifinalists

Year	Miss Ireland	Placement at Miss World
1947	Violet Nolan (Dawn Beauty)	
1950	Fintan Meyler	
1952	Eithne Dunne	
1953	Mary Murphy	
1954	Connie Rodgers	
1955	Evelyn Foley	
1956	Amy Kelly	
1957	Nessa Welsh	
1958	Susan Riddell	
1959	Ann Fitzpatrick	
1960	Irene Ruth Kane	Top 10
1961	Olive Ursula White	Top 15
1962	Muriel O'Hanlon	
1963	Joan Power	
1964	Mairead Cullen	
1965	Gladys Anne Waller	2nd Runner-up
1966	Helen McMahon	
1967	Gemma McNabb	
1968	June MacMahon	Top 15
1969	Charlotte Delamere	
1970	Mary Elizabeth McKinley	
1971	June Glover	
1972	Cathy Talbot	
1973	Yvonne Costelloe	
1974	Julie Ann Farnham	Top 15
1975	Elaine Rosemary O'Hora	
1976	Jakki Moore	Top 15
1977	Loraine Bernadette Enriquez	
1978	Lorraine Marion O'Connor	
1979	Maura McMenamim	
1980	Michelle Rocca	
1981	Geraldine Mary McGrory	Top 15
1982	Roberta Brown	6th Runner-Up
1983	Patricia 'Trish' Nolan	Top 15
1984	Olivia Tracey	6th Runner-Up
1985	Anne Marie Gannon	Top 15
1986	Rosemary Elizabeth Thompson	Top 15
1987	Adrienne Rock	
1988	Colette Jackson	
1989	Barbara Ann Curran	Top 10
1990	Siobhan McClafferty	1st Runner-up
1991	Amanda Brunker	
1992	Sharon Ellis	
1993	Pamela Flood	
1994	Anna Maria McCarthy	
1995	Joanne Black	
1996	Niamh Marie Redmond	
1997	Andrea Roche	
1998	Vivienne Doyle	
1999	Emir-Maria Holohan Doyle	
2000	Yvonne Ellard	
2001	Catrina Supple	
2002	Lynda Duffy	
2003	Rosanna Davison	Miss World 2003
2004	Natasha Nic Gairbheith	
2005	Aoife Mary Cogan	
2006	Sarah Morrissey	
2007	Bláthnaid McKenna	
2008	Sinéad Noonan	
2009	Laura Patterson	
2010	Emma Waldron	Top 7, Miss World Talent
2011	Holly Carpenter	
2012	Rebecca Maguire	
2012	Marie Hughes	Dethroned
2013	Aoife Walsh	
2014	Jessica Hayes	
2015	Sacha Livingstone	
2016	Niamh Kennedy	
2017	Lauren McDonagh	
2018	Aoife O'Sullivan	Miss World Sport (Top 24)
2019	Chelsea Farrell	Miss World Head to Head (Top 20)
2020	Due to the impact of COVID-19 pandemic, no pageant in 2020	
2021	Pamela Uba	Top 40, Miss World Talent (2nd Runner-Up) & Miss World Sport (Top 32)
2022	Due to the impact of COVID-19 pandemic, no pageant in 2022	
2023	Ivanna McMahon	Miss World Talent (Top 14)& Miss World Head to Head (Top 25)
2024	No competition held	
2025	Jasmine Gerhardt	Top 20, Miss World Head to Head (Top 8) & Miss World Top Model
2026	Caoimhe Kenny	
2027	Iris Ruddy	TBA

== See also ==
- Alternative Miss Ireland
- Miss Northern Ireland
- Miss Universe Ireland
