= Bhasha Mukherjee =

India-British physician and beauty queen (born 1995)

- ভাষা মুখার্জি
- Born: 5 November 1995 (age 30); Kolkata, West Bengal, India
- Height: 5 ft (1.5 m)
- Beauty pageant titleholder
- Title: Miss England 2019
- Hair color: Black
- Eye color: Hazel/light brown
- Major competition: Miss World 2019 (top 40)
- Website: www.bhashamukherjee.net

Bhasha Mukherjee (born 5 November 1995) is an Indian-British doctor and beauty pageant titleholder who was crowned Miss England 2019 and represented England at the Miss World 2019 pageant. In 2025, Mukherjee featured on Genius Game.

== Filmography ==
=== Television ===
Year	Series	Role	Notes	Ref.
2025	Genius Game	Herself	4 episodes	

Awards and achievements
Preceded by Alisha Cowie	Miss England; 2019	Succeeded by Rehema Muthamia
