= Miss Grand Sri Lanka 2018 =

2nd Miss Grand Sri Lanka, beauty pageant edition

- Date: 16 September 2018
- Presenters: Anuj Ranasinghe
- Entertainment: Stephanie Siriwardhana
- Venue: Water's Edge Hotel, Colombo
- Broadcaster: Independent Television Network
- Entrants: 14
- Placements: 5
- Winner: Pawani Vithanage (Colombo)

Miss Grand Sri Lanka 2018 was the second edition of the Miss Grand Sri Lanka pageant, held on 16 September 2018, at Water's Edge Hotel, Colombo, where a 23-year-old accounting and business management student from University of Kelaniya, Pawani Vithanage, was announced the winner, while Harini Silva and Tasla Senadeera were named the first and second runners-up, respectively. Pawani later represented the country at the Miss Grand International 2018 held in Myanmar on 25 October 2018, and she was placed among the top twenty finalists.

The contest featured fourteen candidates who qualified for the national pageant via an audition held earlier in mid-year. and was organised in parallel with a male pageant, Mister International Sri Lanka 2018. No live-transmitted was performed, but the grand final round of the contest was later aired to an audience nationwide on 4 November 2018, via a Sri Lankan state-governed television channel, Independent Television Network (ITN).

== Pageant ==
An application for the Miss Grand Sri Lanka 2018 pageant was officially opened on 4 June, with a deadline on July 3. An initial profile screening was then done by the organiser to select the qualified applicants to attend the audion round held later on 12 July at Cinnamon Grand Colombo, where the number of finalists was reduced to 14.

In the grand final round of the contest, which was held on 16 September 16, the competition began with the traditional costume parade followed by the swimsuit and evening gown rounds, the judges then select the final five candidates to face a question and answer round to determine the winner and her two runners-up.

The following lists are judges for the audition and finale rounds of the contest.

Audition round

- Ornella Gunesekere
- Dannielle Kerkoven
- Kamil Hewavitharana
- Charith Wijesekera
- Brian Kerkoven
- Kasun Gairika Weerasinghe
- Danushka Senadeera

Final round

- Ramani Fernando
- Kishu Gomes
- Jacquie Mei
- Stephanie Siriwardhana
- Daniel Rene Desilva

== Candidates ==
Fourteen delegates competed for the title of Miss Grand Sri Lanka 2018.

No.	Candidate	Age	Height
01	Sanduni Kirthisinghe	20	1.63 m (5 ft 4 in)
02	Sandunika Bandara	26	1.63 m (5 ft 4 in)
03	Chathuni Senanayake	22	1.65 m (5 ft 5 in)
04	Melissa Nanayakkara	22	1.65 m (5 ft 5 in)
05	Sachini Suraweera	26	1.65 m (5 ft 5 in)
06	Chalani Nisansala	24	1.66 m (5 ft 5 1/2 in)
07	Southamini Shanthakumar	25	1.66 m (5 ft 5 1/2 in)
08	Ofelya Kariyawasam	26	1.68 m (5 ft 6 in)
09	Pawani Vithanage	23	1.68 m (5 ft 6 in)
10	Harini Silva	23	1.73 m (5 ft 8 in)
11	Tasla Senadeera	20	1.73 m (5 ft 8 in)
12	Kathy Ferdinanz	21	1.73 m (5 ft 8 in)
13	Menushi Bandara	20	1.78 m (5 ft 10 in)
14	Rajini Thilakarathne	25	1.80 m (5 ft 11 in)
