= Anuradhapura Central College =

National school in Anuradhapura, Sri Lanka

- මධ්‍ය විද්‍යාලය, අනුරාධපුර

Location
- Anuradhapura, 50000; Sri Lanka; 8.3352°N 80.4075°E

Information
- Type: National school
- Motto: අසමු දරමු හැසිරෙමු ("Hearken, Memorize, Act")
- Established: 21 July 1947; 79 years ago
- School district: Anuradhapura District
- Authority: North Central Province Education Department
- Principal: Ayanthi Rathnayake
- Grades: 6–13
- Gender: Co-educational
- Enrollment: Approximately 4,500 (school estimate, 2026)
- Language: Sinhala and English
- Houses: Ananda, Rahula, Mahinda and Seewali
- Colors: Emerald green and yellow
- Website: anucentralcollege.com

Anuradhapura Central College (මධ්‍ය විද්‍යාලය, අනුරාධපුර; மத்திய கல்லூரி, அனுராதபுரம்) is a co-educational national school in Anuradhapura, North Central Province, Sri Lanka. Founded on 21 July 1947 as part of Sri Lanka's central-college programme, it offers secondary education from grades 6 to 13. The college participates in academic, cultural and sporting activities and has an active former-pupils community.

== History ==
=== Founding and early development ===
The college was established on 21 July 1947 as one of the central colleges associated with the educational reforms of C. W. W. Kannangara, which sought to expand access to secondary education outside major urban centres. It was among the first 54 central colleges and was the second such college established in the North Central Province.

The school originally operated at Rathmale, at the site later occupied by Rathmale Tissa Maha Vidyalaya. It opened as a bilingual evening school with 70 pupils and three teachers; its first principal was R. S. L. de Soysa. It subsequently moved to temporary premises at Saliyapura.

In 1952, the college moved to a site of approximately 6.1 hectares (15 acres) in central Anuradhapura, on land allocated during S. W. R. D. Bandaranaike's tenure as Minister of Local Government. The new location included science facilities and pupil accommodation. E. R. Erathne became the first principal at the new site.

=== Expansion and national-school status ===
During the 1960s, the college began admitting pupils through the grade-five scholarship examination. It was designated a national school on 25 May 1993.

A three-storey classroom building and an auditorium were opened at the college during a visit by President Maithripala Sirisena in April 2018. During the visit, the college's drama group was also recognised for winning first place at the 2017 State Drama Festival.

In June 2025, the Supreme Court of Sri Lanka directed the Ministry of Education to increase classroom capacity in response to a fundamental-rights petition concerning overcrowding at the college. The case concluded after the petitioner sought permission to withdraw it in light of a proposed measure to add a class to grade 8.

== Academics and student activities ==
The school provides education from grades 6 to 13, with senior-secondary subject streams including science, mathematics, commerce, arts, aesthetics and agriculture. It has also offered vocational pathways under the 13 Years Guaranteed Education Programme. The college's co-curricular activities include student leadership, broadcasting, cultural activities and organised sports.

The Zonal Education Office, Anuradhapura publishes examination statistics for the college as part of its school-level reporting. The college's drama group took part in the 2017 State Drama Festival, where it received a first-place award.

== School identity and traditions ==
The school's motto is අසමු දරමු හැසිරෙමු, translated on its website as "Hearken, Memorize, Act". Its anthem begins with the Sinhala words නමදිමු බැති ගී කුසුම් පුදා (Namadimu baethi gee kusum puda).

=== Emeralds identity ===
The name Emeralds is used within the college's pupil and former-pupil communities. An alumni group calling itself Emeralds Club maintained a website in the 2015 that described its members as younger former pupils of Anuradhapura Central College. The group's archived website publicised a Parade of Emeralds in 2016. A parade at the college in 2016 was also documented in a photo gallery published by Hiru.

== Sports ==
The college participates in cricket, athletics, volleyball, swimming and other inter-school sports. Its sporting record includes achievements at all-island and provincial level.

=== Cricket ===
In the 2013–14 school cricket season, the under-19 side won the all-island Division II title and qualified to compete in Division I the following season. A March 2014 report in Daily FT identified the victory as the college's sixth all-island schools cricket championship, following titles in under-13, under-15, under-17 and under-19 divisions during earlier seasons.

=== Athletics and provincial games ===
At the 2019 North Central Provincial Sports Meet, the college finished as overall first runner-up and won the boys' championship.

The college won the overall championship at the North Central Province games of the 2022 CBL Samaposha Provincial School Games. Its pupils also received individual athletics distinctions, including in javelin and long jump events. The school was again named North Central Province champion at the 2023 CBL Samaposha Provincial School Games, held in Anuradhapura from 5 to 8 September.

=== Volleyball ===
In 2005, the school's Under-19 girls' volleyball team became all-island champions in the DSI Supersport Schools Volleyball Championship. At the 2017 DSI schools' volleyball selection competitions, the college won the Anuradhapura District girls' under-17 and under-19 categories.

=== Sports School ===
The school features an athletic academy aligned with the "sports school" concept implemented in certain remote central colleges to nurture rural talent. It offers boarding and meals to young athletes from the Anuradhapura District, with students admitted at age 13 based on their sports achievements. The school consistently excels in district-level and provincial-level tournaments and proceed talents to all-island games. In 2023, it secured the championship title at the North-Central Provincial School Games, further solidifying its reputation as a dominant force in the region. In 2019, the athletics team secured the Boys’ Championship trophy at the North-Central Provincial Sports Meet. The school also organises an annual inter-house track-and-field tournament.

=== Houses ===
The pupils are divided among four houses, which compete at the school's annual inter-house sports meet.

- Ananda
- Mahinda
- Seewali
- Rahula

== Facilities ==
The college has a library, science and computer laboratories, teaching facilities, sports grounds and an auditorium. A swimming pool was inaugurated on 13 July 2024 at a ceremony attended by President Ranil Wickremesinghe. News reporting credited both the government and alumni contributors with supporting the project.

In April 2026, Sri Lanka's Ministry of Defence reported that renovation work at the college was being undertaken by the Sri Lanka Air Force with private financial support.

== Alumni associations ==
The college's Past Pupils' Association was established in October 1980 and has supported the development of school facilities and educational activities. Its Colombo branch, established in 1989, introduced a scholarship programme to provide financial assistance to students. In August 2016, the branch organised a fundraising concert at the Bandaranaike Memorial International Conference Hall to support the programme.

The Emeralds Club was established in 2015 as an association of younger alumni, organising activities associated with the college's annual anniversary celebrations. Its website, preserved by the Internet Archive, documented the association's activities and promoted events such as the Parade of Emeralds. The club subsequently merged with the Past Pupils' Association, gaining three voting rights in the association's general assembly. The name "Emeralds" is also used as a collective nickname for the college's current students and former pupils.

== Notable alumni ==
Anuradhapura Central College has produced graduates in many fields such as engineering, medicine, law, politics, education, administration, mass-media and entertainment, including:

- Shirani Bandaranayake - the first female Chief Justice of Sri Lanka
- C. M. Madduma Bandara - emeritus professor of geography and former Vice-Chancellor of the University of Peradeniya (1994–1997). He attended Anuradhapura Central College from 1950 to 1959.
- Nanda Mallawaarachchi - former Secretary of Sports in Sri Lanka, Former Secretary of Law & Order in Sri Lanka, Acting Commander & 38th Chief of Staff of the Sri Lanka Army, Former Ambassador of Sri Lanka in Indonesia
- Ran Banda Seneviratne - a lawyer, author, lyricist, television and radio presenter.
- Sirimevan Ranasinghe - 22nd Commander of the Navy (Sri Lanka), and former Chief of Staff of the Sri Lanka Navy
- Simon Navagattegama - a Sinhala novelist, Sinhala Radio Play writer, playwright and actor.
- Wasantha Dukgannarala - actor, lyricist, television presenter and author.
- Jagath Wickramasinghe - singer, musician, composer and former Chairman of the Sri Lanka Broadcasting Corporation.
- Chandrika de Silva - international badminton player and World Senior Champion.
- P. Harrison - former Minister of Rural Economic Affairs, Minister of Social Empowerment, and Minister of Agriculture, Rural Economic Affairs, Livestock Development, Irrigation, Fisheries and Aquatic Resources Development.
- Berty Premalal Dissanayake - former Deputy Minister of Industrial Development.
- Duminda Dissanayake - former cabinet Minister of Education Services.
- Lakshan Edirisinghe - a first-class Sri Lankan cricketer captained for Sri Lanka Army Sports Club (cricket)
- K. D. Lalkantha - current Minister of Agriculture, Livestock, Land and Irrigation (since 2024).
- Anudi Gunasekara - winner of Miss World Sri Lanka 2024; First Runner-up in the Miss World 2025 Multimedia Challenge
- Poojana Dandeniya - theatre, television, and film actor; winner of Best Supporting Actor at the Raigam Tele'es and Sumathi Awards.
- Dimuthu Chinthaka - film, television and stage actor; served as secretary of the school's Past Pupils' Association in 2018.

== External links and sources ==
- Official website
- Emeralds Club website (archived in 2016)
- Anuradhapura Sacred City
