= Miss Grand Sri Lanka =

National beauty contest in Sri Lanka

- Formation: September 25, 2016; 10 years ago
- Founder: Brian Kerkoven
- Type: Beauty pageant
- Headquarters: Colombo
- Location: Sri Lanka
- Members: Miss Grand International
- Official language: English
- National Director: Rukmal Senanayake (2025 - 2026); Dannielle Kerkoven (2020–2023); Brian Kerkoven (2013–2018)
- Parent organization: Brian Kerkoven Model Agency (2013 – 2023)

Miss Grand Sri Lanka is a national beauty pageant in Sri Lanka, founded in 2016 by Colombo-based designer Brian Kerkoven, aiming to select the country's representative to compete in its parent contest Miss Grand International. The competition was held twice; in 2016 and 2018, after that the Sri Lankan candidates to Miss Grand International were appointed instead.

Since their first participation at Miss Grand International in 2013, Sri Lanka representatives have never won the contest but got placements four times including being the top 10 finalists in 2013 and 2015, and the top 20 finalists in 2014 and 2018.

== History ==
Sri Lanka made its debut at Miss Grand International in 2013 with the top 10 finalists placement by 24 years-old Colombo-based model Dannielle Kerkoven. Under the directorship of Brian Kerkoven, who has served as the licensee of Miss Grand Sri Lanka since 2013, the inaugural edition of the Miss Grand national contest was held in 2016 at Taj Samudra Hotel in Colombo, featuring ten national delegates, which a senior business student Harshani Ruman was named the winner, the following edition of the contest was held in 2018, both editions were broadcast on the Sri Lankan state governed television channel Independent Television Network (ITN). However, due to a newly established national pageant, Miss & Mister Sri Lanka was founded in 2019 by Brian Kerkoven as the replacement contest, and no Miss Grand national contest has additionally been held, the country representatives at Miss Grand International were instead appointed since then.

Since the first participation in 2013, Sri Lanka representatives got four placements at Miss Grand International, the highest position was the top 10 finalists, obtained by Dannielle Kerkoven and Ornella Gunesekere in 2013 and 2015, respectively.

== Editions ==
The following list is the competition details of the Miss Grand Sri Lanka pageant since its inception in 2016.

Miss Grand Sri Lanka edition details
Year	Edition	Date	Venue	Entrants	Winner	Ref.
2016	1st	25 Sep	Taj Samudra Hotel, Colombo	10	Harshani Ruman	
2018	2nd	16 Sep	Waters Edge, Colombo	14	Pawani Vithanage	
2025	3rd	24 Sep	Mount Lavinia General Hotel, Colombo	16	Tishani Perera	

== International competition ==
The main finalists of the Miss Grand Sri Lanka pageant have been sent to represent the country in various international contests, the following is a list of international contests, with participants from Miss Grand Sri Lanka as contestants based on the year the pageant was held, the competition results included.

Color keys for the placements at international contest

Declared as the winner
Ended as a runner-up (Top 5)
Ended as a finalist (Top 10)

Ended as a semifinalist (Top 20/21)
Unplaced
Did not compete

=== Miss Grand International ===
Year	Representative	Original national title	Competition performance		National director	Ref.
Year	Representative	Original national title	Placements	Other award	National director	Ref.
2025	Tishani Perera	Miss Grand Sri Lanka 2025	Unplaced		Rukmal Senanayake	
2024	No representative					
2023	Sayuri Bhagyawi	Appointed	Withdrew		Dannielle Kerkoven	
2022	Nihari Perera	Miss Teen Sri Lanka 2021	Unplaced		Dannielle Kerkoven	
2021	Anna-Marie Ondaatje	Appointed	Unplaced		Dannielle Kerkoven	
2020	Prathibha Liyanaarchchi	Appointed	Unplaced		Dannielle Kerkoven	
2019	No representative					
2018	Pawani Vithanage	Miss Grand Sri Lanka 2018	Top 20		Brian Kerkoven	
2017	Visna Fernando	Top Model of the World Sri Lanka 2016 (Note: Special title at the Miss Grand Sri Lanka 2016 pageant.)	Unplaced		Brian Kerkoven	
2016	Harshani Ruman	Miss Grand Sri Lanka 2016	Unplaced		Brian Kerkoven	
2015	Ornella Gunesekere	Appointed	Top 10	Miss Popular Vote	Brian Kerkoven	
2014	Iresha Asanki	Miss World Sri Lanka 2013	Top 20		Brian Kerkoven	
2013	Dannielle Kerkoven	Miss World Sri Lanka 2006	Top 10		Brian Kerkoven	

Gallery

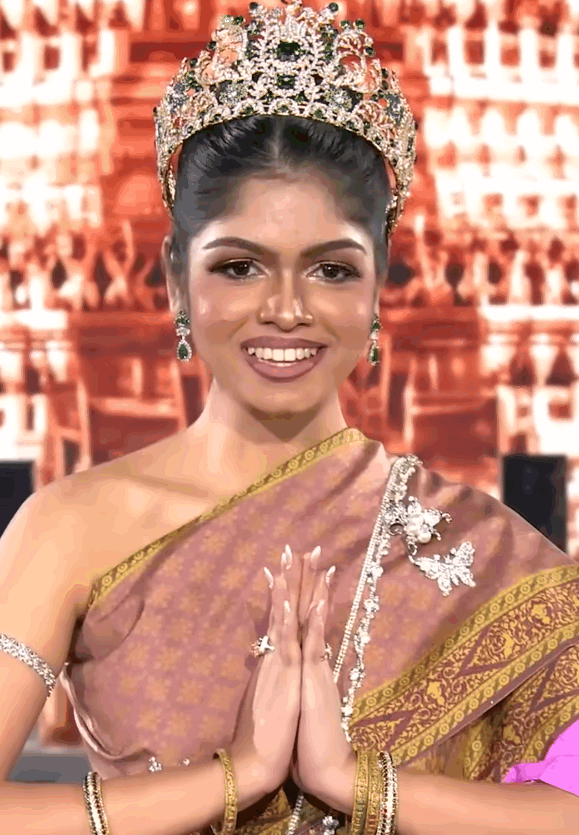
Miss Grand Sri Lanka 2025
Tishani Perera

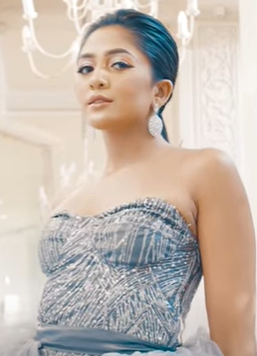
Miss Grand Sri Lanka 2022
Nihari Perera

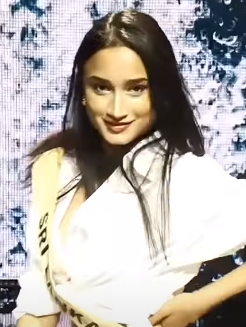
Miss Grand Sri Lanka 2021
Anna-Marie Ondaatje

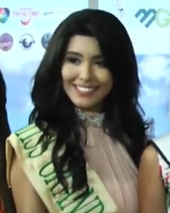
Miss Grand Sri Lanka 2015
Ornella Gunesekere

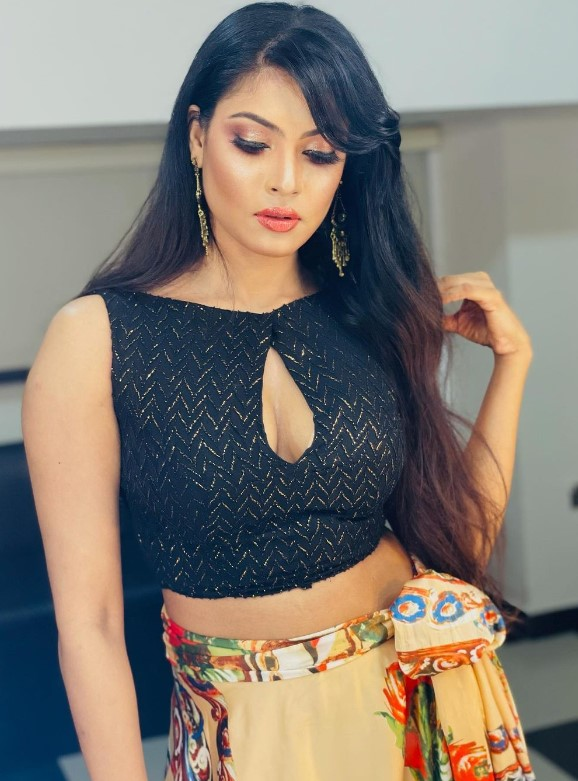
Miss Grand Sri Lanka 2014
Iresha Asanki

=== Other international pageants ===
Year	Representative	Original national title	International contest		Ref.
Year	Representative	Original national title	Pageant	Placement	Ref.
2019	Visna Fernando	Top Model of the World Sri Lanka 2016	Face of Asia 2019	2nd runner-up	
2018	Harini Silva	1st runner-up Miss Grand Sri Lanka 2018	Top Model of the World 2018	1st runner-up	
2018	Prisca Rathnasingham	Contestant of Miss Grand Sri Lanka 2018	Supermodel International 2018	Unplaced	
2017	Nilusha Madhuwanthi	1st runner-up Miss Grand Sri Lanka 2016	Supermodel International 2017	Unplaced	
2016	Ishanka Jayani de Alwis	Supermodel Sri Lanka 2016	Supermodel International 2016	Top 15	
2016	Visna Fernando	Top Model of the World Sri Lanka 2016	Top Model of the World 2016	2nd runner-up	
