= Weeraman =

Weeraman is a surname. Notable people with the surname include:

- Dushyanth Weeraman (born 1983), Sri Lankan singer
- Nayantha Weeraman (born 1977), Sri Lankan cricketer
- Santhush Weeraman (born 1977), member of Sri Lankan pop duo Bathiya and Santhush
