= Maria Colombage =

Sri Lankan model (born 1984)

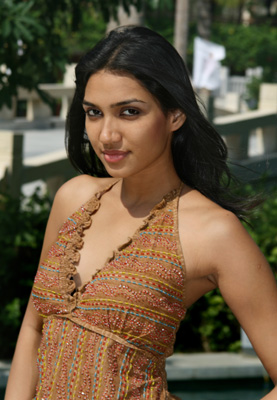
- Born: Romanthi Maria Colombage; 19 May 1984 (age 41); Colombo, Sri Lanka
- Beauty pageant titleholder
- Title: Miss Sri Lanka 2007

Romanthi Maria Colombage (born 19 May 1984) is a Sri Lankan model and beauty pageant titleholder who was crowned Miss World Sri Lanka 2007 and represented Sri Lanka at Miss World 2007 in China. Colombage is one of the most successful models in Sri Lanka. She has done fashion shows in Europe and Asia.

== Background ==
Colombage was born in Colombo, Sri Lanka. She has one sister, Rapthi in her family. She was educated at Holy Family Convent Colombo 04 and completed a Diploma in Fashion Designing by the age of 18, followed by the Chartered Institute of Marketing qualification which she acquired by the age of 21. She has her Masters in Business Administration from the University of Wales in Cardiff.

She was approached by a choreographer when she was just seventeen and was asked to model for a fashion show in Colombo and was trained to be a catwalk model. Thereafter she has modeled on ramp around Europe and Asia.

In 2003, she was one of the creative Minds behind one of Sri Lankas most prominent Brands Named "Bellucci" owned by Businessman Roshan Perera which designed and manufactured figurines for Disney and Hallmark. She was also instrumental in diversifying the Brand into Clothing

== Modelling and fashion ==
She has done several photoshoots both in Sri Lanka and India. When she was just 18 she flew to Dubai and Pakistan to model and then was taken to Germany, London and Paris to model on ramp. She has also modeled in Thailand, Singapore and China. She soon made a name for herself in her home country and was crowned Miss Sri Lanka for Miss World in 2007.

She was approached in 2008 by Prasad Bidappa Associates in Bangalore to model, and was selected to become the new face of ābharan jewelry Bangalore India in 2008. She spent six months in India modeling thereafter.

Colombage has also been the face for Colombo Jewellery Stores Sri Lanka and did their campaigns in 2008 and 2009. She modeled for Buddhi batiks swim wear photoshoot in 2010. Colombage has secured contracts with Nations Trust Bank, Singer and Asian Alliance Insurance appearing in advertisements.

== Personal life ==
On 10 July 2010 she married Gayan Wijesinha an investment banker working in London. She was married in S. Thomas' Chapel, Mount Lavinia. The wedding reception was held at the Mount Lavinia Hotel private beach. She and her husband now live in London.
