= Visna Fernando =

Sri Lankan Beauty Queen

- Born: 18 June 1991 (age 35); Negombo, Sri Lanka
- Education: Newstead Girls College; Kelaniya University
- Occupation: Model
- Height: 5 ft 7 in (170 cm)
- Beauty pageant titleholder
- Title: Miss Earth Sri Lanka 2015; Miss Grand Sri Lanka 2017
- Hair color: Black
- Eye color: Black
- Major competitions: Miss World Sri Lanka 2014 (Top 5); Miss Earth Sri Lanka 2015 (Winner); Miss Earth 2015 (Unplaced); Top Model of the World 2016 (2nd runner-up); Miss Grand Sri Lanka 2017 (Winner); Miss Grand International 2017 (Unplaced)

Paththage Visna Kaumini Fernando (Sinhala: පත්තගේ විස්නා කවිමිනි ප්‍රනාන්දු) (born on 18 June 1991) is a Sri Lankan beauty pageant titleholder who was crowned as Miss Earth Sri Lanka 2015 and Sri Lanka's representative in Miss Earth 2015.

== Biography ==
=== Education ===
Visna studies via External degree program of Kelaniya University while following her CBF at Institute of Bankers of Sri Lanka.

== Pageantry ==
=== Miss World Sri Lanka 2014 ===
Visna joined the Miss World Sri Lanka pageant in 2014. The pageant was won by Chulakshi Ranathunga who represented Sri Lanka in Miss World 2014 in London but was declared unplaced.

=== Miss Earth Sri Lanka 2015 ===
Visna once again competed in a national pageant, this time through Miss Earth Sri Lanka. The pageant concentrates on environmental awareness. In the pageant held at Citrus Waskaduwa Hotel in Colombo on 3 June 2015 she was declared the winner, Sathma Nugera the first runner up and Harshani Ruman the second runner up. Miss Earth Sri Lanka 2014, Imaya Liyanage and Miss Earth 2014 Jamie Herrell of the Philippines crowned Fernando at the end of the event.

=== Miss Earth 2015 ===
By virtue of winning Miss Earth Sri Lanka for 2015, Visna was Sri Lanka's representative to Miss Earth 2015 held on 5 December 2015 at Marx Halle in Vienna, Austria. She was unplaced.

=== Top Model of the World 2016 ===
As Sri Lanka’s representative, Visna was the 2nd runner up in the Top Model of the World 2016 contest held in Bremen, Germany

Awards and achievements
Preceded by Imaya Liyanage	Miss Earth Sri Lanka; 2015	Succeeded by Dimanthi Edirirathna
