= Anudi Gunasekara =

Sri Lankan model (born 1999)

- Born: November 7, 1999 (age 26); Anuradhapura, Sri Lanka
- Education: Anuradhapura Central College; University of Kelaniya
- Occupations: Model; Social Activist; TV Presenter; Radio Host
- Height: 171 cm (67 in)
- Awards: Soorya Top 40 - The Most Inspirational Youth of the Year (2025); Soorya Top 40 - Youth Winner for the North Central Province (2025); Vanithabhimani - Most Popular Woman of the Year (2025); Iconic Awards - Hall of Fame Award (2025); Headliner of the Year Award - Derana Calin Aya Pranama Awards (2025); Special Appreciation Award - Calin Popular Awards (2025); Personality for the Year (2025) - LMD Magazine; Most Popular & Exceptional Young Female International Representative of Sri Lanka - UKQA T Awards 2025-26
- Beauty pageant titleholder
- Title: Miss World Sri Lanka 2024
- Major competitions: Miss World Sri Lanka 2024 (Winner, Best in Evening Wear, Miss Popular); Miss World 2025 (Unplaced) Top 24 Finalist - Talent, Top 20 Finalist - Head to Head Challenge, Runners Up Asia - Multimedia Challenge

Anudi Gunasekara (Sinhala: අනුදි ගුණසේකර, born 7 November 1999) is a Sri Lankan model, social activist, and beauty queen who was crowned Miss World Sri Lanka 2024.

In 2025, she represented Sri Lanka at the 72nd Miss World pageant held in Hyderabad, India. Gunasekara is best known for her Beauty with a Purpose project, Saheli, a campaign to combat period poverty in Sri Lanka. She is also the first Sri Lankan contestant to reach the finals of the Miss World Talent, Head to Head and Multimedia competitions.

== Early life and education ==
Gunasekara was born in Anuradhapura, Sri Lanka. She had her primary education at Anuradhapura D.S. Senanayake Model Primary school and her secondary education at Anuradhapura Central College. She further obtained a degree in International Relations from the University of Kelaniya.

== Pageant career ==
Gunasekara's pageantry career began in 2024 when she competed in and won the Miss World Sri Lanka title. Alongside the main crown, she was also awarded the Most Popular and Best in Evening Wear mini titles. Her Beauty with a Purpose project entitled "Saheli", aims to alleviate period poverty in Sri Lanka. She represented Sri Lanka in the competition for the 72nd Miss World title.

At the 72nd Miss World pageant, Gunasekara became a finalist in the Miss World Talent segment, the Head to Head Challenge, and the Multimedia Challenge. She was the first Sri Lankan contestant to reach the finals in all three categories. She was eventually selected as the first runner-up from Asia in the Multimedia Challenge, placing her among the top eight winners of the segment.

== Advocacy ==
Gunasekara's Beauty with a Purpose project, titled Saheli, focused on addressing period poverty in Sri Lanka. The initiative aimed to improve menstrual hygiene awareness and accessibility by distributing sanitary products and providing education to women and girls in both rural and urban communities. Saheli also conducted awareness campaigns and school outreach programs to reduce stigma surrounding menstruation.

In addition to community engagement, the project included a policy advocacy component. Gunasekara held discussions with Sri Lankan Prime Minister Harini Amarasuriya regarding the taxation of menstrual hygiene products, proposing a reduction to improve affordability. The initiative was presented as both a grassroots and legislative effort to address menstrual health challenges in the country.

For her work through Saheli, Gunasekara was recognized as a BleedGood Ambassador by the Selyn Foundation. She was also appointed as an honorary member of Rotary International District 3220 in acknowledgment of her contributions to social welfare and public health advocacy.

In June 2025, Gunasekara was appointed as an ambassador for the Little Hearts Foundation by Rotary International District 3220 at the Rotary District Awards. The Little Hearts Foundation is a Sri Lankan initiative dedicated to building and supporting a cardiac and critical care complex for children at the Lady Ridgeway Hospital for Children in Colombo, aiming to provide lifesaving treatment for children with congenital heart diseases and critical illnesses.

In the same month, Gunasekara was conferred with two recognitions at the Youth Top40 Awards 2025 organized by New Generation Sri Lanka, held at Shangri-La Colombo. She was named The Most Inspirational Youth of the Year and was also recognized as the Soorya Top 40 Youth Winner for the North Central Province. The Youth Top40 Awards celebrate outstanding young Sri Lankans across diverse sectors, acknowledging their contributions to the nation's progress. Organized by New Generation Sri Lanka, under the leadership of founder Dr. Sulochana Segera, and supported by Soorya, the awards aim to promote youth leadership, personal growth, and social impact.

In August 2025, Gunasekara was honored with the Most Popular Woman Award at Vanithabhimani 2025, organized by Sirasa TV in partnership with NDB Bank, and she also received the Iconic Award’s highest honour—the Hall of Fame Award. In September 2025, she was further recognized with the Headliner of the Year award at the Derana Calin Aya Pranama Awards and received a Special Appreciation Award at the Calin Popular Awards 2025. Additionally, she was appointed as a Global Ambassador for The Pad Project, a global nonprofit dedicated to expanding access to menstrual care products, combating period stigma, and championing menstrual equity for all.

Building on this momentum, Gunasekara's advocacy efforts received further international and national recognition in 2026. In January, LMD magazine named her Personality of the Year (2025), acknowledging her impact beyond the beauty pageant arena and recognizing how she transformed her public platform into meaningful social advocacy, particularly through her work addressing period poverty and menstrual health stigma in Sri Lanka via the Saheli Foundation. She also received the Most Popular & Exceptional Young Female International Representative of Sri Lanka award at the UKQA T Awards 2025–26.

== Post pageant career ==
Following her participation in Miss World 2025, Gunasekara ventured into media and public advocacy. In September 2025, she launched her own television program Aya (Sinhala: ඇය) on Siyatha TV and a weekly radio show on Lite87, both aimed at uplifting women through meaningful conversations. She also became an active public speaker, appearing at schools and professional forums to discuss topics including social media, women's empowerment, and the evolving role of influencers in modern branding. In 2026, she delivered a TEDxRoyalCollegeYouth talk, further cementing her role as a public advocate for social impact and women's empowerment. Aya received widespread critical acclaim during its run and was subsequently nominated for Best Television Program and Most Popular Television Program at the 31st Sumathi Awards 2026.

Awards and achievements
Preceded by Kavindi Nethmini	Miss World Sri Lanka; 2024	Succeeded by Prathibha Liyanaarachchi
