= Zoalize Jansen van Rensburg =

South African beauty pageant titleholder (born 2005)

- Born: Zoalize Jansen van Rensburg; 28 October 2005 (age 21); Pretoria, South Africa
- Occupations: Model; fashion designer
- Height: 1.72 m (5 ft 8 in)
- Beauty pageant titleholder
- Title: Miss World South Africa 2024
- Major competitions: Miss World South Africa 2023 (1st Runner-up); Miss World South Africa 2024 (Winner); Miss World 2025 (Unplaced); Miss South Africa 2026 (Top 12)

Zoalize Jansen van Rensburg (born 28 October 2005) is a South African model, fashion designer and beauty pageant titleholder who was crowned Miss World South Africa 2024. At 18 years old, she became the youngest winner in the competition's history. She went on to represent South Africa at the Miss World 2025 pageant in India, where she won the Best Designer Dress challenge.

== Pageantry ==
=== Miss World South Africa 2023 ===
Jansen van Rensburg began her national pageantry career in 2023, representing Pretoria, Gauteng, at the Miss World South Africa 2023 pageant. At 17 years old, she finished as the first runner-up. Jansen van Rensburg returned to the national competition the following year and was crowned Miss World South Africa 2024 at age 18, making her the youngest titleholder to win the crown.

=== Miss World 2025 ===
As the national titleholder, she represented South Africa at the Miss World 2025 pageant held in Telangana, India. During the preliminary events, she earned first place in the Best Designer Dress challenge. Despite being considered a strong contender, she was unplaced in the final competition, ending South Africa's consecutive placement streak at Miss World that had been maintained since 2017.

=== Miss South Africa 2026 ===
In 2026, Jansen van Rensburg was announced as one of the twenty-four finalists competing in the Miss South Africa 2026 national pageant.

Awards and achievements
Preceded by Claude Mashego	Miss World South Africa; 2024	Succeeded by Romanda Hombir
