= C. M. Madduma Bandara =

Sri Lankan geographer and university administrator

- Known for: Research on village tank cascade systems

Academic background
- Education: Anuradhapura Central College; University of Peradeniya; University of Cambridge (PhD)
- Thesis: The morphometry of dissection in the central highlands of Ceylon

Academic work
- Discipline: Geography
- Sub-discipline: Environmental geography; Water resource management
- Institutions: University of Peradeniya

C. M. Madduma Bandara is a Sri Lankan geographer and university administrator who served as Vice-Chancellor of the University of Peradeniya from 1994 to 1997. An emeritus professor of geography at the university, he has worked on land-use planning, water resource management and traditional irrigation systems in Sri Lanka. His research has been cited in subsequent academic studies of Sri Lanka's tank cascade systems.

== Early life and education ==
Madduma Bandara attended Anuradhapura Central College from 1950 to 1959. He studied at the University of Peradeniya between 1960 and 1964, graduating with a bachelor's degree. He subsequently undertook doctoral studies at the University of Cambridge, specialising in land–water interactions and fluvial geomorphology, and completed his doctorate in 1971.

== Academic career ==
Madduma Bandara began teaching at the Colombo campus of the University of Ceylon in 1964. After his postgraduate studies in Cambridge, he returned to Peradeniya, where he became head of the Department of Geography in 1991, serving until 1994, and attained the rank of professor. He served as vice-chancellor from 1994 to 1997 and was subsequently appointed emeritus professor by the university. He retired in 2004.

His overseas academic appointments included work at the University of Ilorin in Nigeria, universities in Cambridge, Tsukuba and Tokyo, the United Nations University, and a visiting professorship at Kyoto University in 2007–2008.

In 2026, Rajarata University of Sri Lanka described his participation in discussions over a proposed university for the Rajarata region during the 1980s. According to the university, he submitted a memorandum supporting the proposal on 18 February 1984 and participated in subsequent planning discussions.

== Research and public service ==
=== Water resources and irrigation ===
Madduma Bandara's academic work has addressed watershed management, agriculture and groundwater use, coastal planning, environmental management and indigenous knowledge. His research included studies of traditional village reservoirs in Sri Lanka's dry zone and their organisation into interconnected catchment systems. In the early 1980s, he mapped the island's entire coastline for the Coast Conservation Department.

In a chapter published in 1985, Catchment Ecosystems and Village Tank Cascades in the Dry Zone of Sri Lanka, he examined the relationships between connected irrigation reservoirs, catchments and land management. Later researchers have cited this work in studies of the ecological structure and management of tank cascade systems. In reporting on a tank restoration project in the Anuradhapura District in 2017, The Sunday Times quoted Madduma Bandara on the effects of inappropriate land use and soil erosion on reservoir sedimentation.

=== Environmental policy and regional planning ===
Madduma Bandara chaired Sri Lanka's Presidential Land Commission from 1985 to 1989 and the interim National Water Resources Authority in 2004. He also chaired the National Environmental Council in 1995-1997 and 2001-2006 and the Academic Board of the National Institute of Education in 2002–2004. In 2021–2022, he chaired a cabinet-appointed expert committee working on a national water policy.

He contributed to the preparation of Sri Lanka's first National Environmental Action Plan and advocated approaches to regional planning based on river basins. In a 2022 article in ColomboArts, he proposed a revised structure for regional governance drawing on the historical regions of Ruhunu, Maya and Pihiti. He also worked with the World Bank, USAID, NORAD, GTZ and IUCN.

== Honours and recognition ==
Madduma Bandara received an honorary Doctor of Science degree from Sabaragamuwa University of Sri Lanka in 2010. The University of Peradeniya awarded him an honorary Doctor of Letters at its 2022 general convocation. He received another honorary Doctor of Letters degree from Rajarata University of Sri Lanka in 2026.

He has also received an award of merit from Lanka Jalani for contributions to the water sector. He received the Rajarata Abhimanaya in 2020. He received the Hela Abhimanya in 2025. In 2026, he received an Award of Excellence from the Bhikkhu University of Sri Lanka. He is a fellow of the National Academy of Sciences of Sri Lanka and the Royal Geographical Society.

== Selected publications ==
- Madduma Bandara, C. M. (1985). "Catchment ecosystems and village tank cascades in the dry zone of Sri Lanka: A time-tested system of land and water resource management". In Strategies for River Basin Management. D. Reidel. doi:10.1007/978-94-009-5458-8_11.
- Madduma Bandara, C. M. (2022). "Back to Ruhunu, Maya, and Pihiti: A Sustainable Strategy for Regional Governance". ColomboArts: Journal of Social Sciences and Humanities. 7 (2): 1–14.
