= Charlotte Grant (model) =

English businesswoman, model, and beauty pageant titleholder (born 2000)

- Born: Charley Cox; 2000 (age 25–26); Kirkby, England
- Occupations: Businesswoman; model; beauty pageant titleholder
- Beauty pageant titleholder
- Title: Miss Liverpool 2024; Miss Cosmo England 2024
- Major competitions: Miss England 2024; (1st Runner-up); Miss Cosmo 2024; (Unplaced); Miss World 2025; (Unplaced)

Charley Cox (born 2000), known professionally as Charlotte Grant, is an English businesswoman, model, and beauty pageant titleholder who represented her country in Miss Cosmo 2024 and Miss World 2025.

== Early life and education ==
Grant, from Kirkby, England, was born in 2000. She has 2 siblings. When she was 10 years old, she broke her back in an accident in Dumfries, Scotland, during a holiday. Though told she might never walk again, she had recovered about two years after the accident. She won a sports award in 2014 while she attended St Bede's Catholic High School, Ormskirk. She later studied at Runshaw College.

== Career ==
In 2019, Grant received support from the Prince's Trust, and started her own cosmetics company, Charlotte Grant Cosmetics. She named it after her mother's maiden name. The company initially made eyebrow soap, a vegan product. As of 2025, Grant is a part-time model, and says she has been modelling since she was 4 years old.

== Pageantry ==
In 2024, she won the Miss Liverpool beauty pageant, the first beauty pageant she competed in. Later that year, she became the Miss England runner-up. She also participated in the Miss Cosmo 2024 pageant. When the Miss England 2024 winner, Milla Magee, suddenly withdrew from the 2025 Miss World competition, Grant replaced her, having had 48 hours notice.
