= Nadja Breytenbach =

Miss Namibia 2019

- Born: Windhoek, Namibia
- Beauty pageant titleholder
- Title: Miss Namibia 2019
- Hair color: Dark Brown
- Eye color: Blue
- Major competitions: Miss Namibia 2019 (Winner); Miss Universe 2019

Nadja Breytenbach is a Namibian model and beauty pageant titleholder who was crowned the title of Miss Namibia 2019. She represented Namibia during Miss Universe 2019.

== Pageantry ==
On 6 July 2019, Breytenbach first participated at Miss Namibia 2019 competition. She won the pageant which was held at Windhoek Country Club Resort and Casino in Windhoek. Her court, which included Julita-Kitwe Mbangula, was chosen as the first runner-up while Johanna Swartbooi was selected as the second runner-up. She was crowned by the outgoing titleholder Selma Kamanya, Miss Namibia 2018. As Miss Namibia, Breytenbach represented her country at Miss Universe 2019 pageant.

Awards and achievements
| Preceded by Selma Kamanya | Miss Namibia; 2019 | Succeeded by TBD |
