= Selma Kamanya =

Miss Namibia 2018

- Born: Selma Carlicia Kamanya; 31 December 1996 (age 29); Windhoek, Namibia
- Height: 1.75 m (5 ft 9 in)
- Beauty pageant titleholder
- Title: Miss Namibia 2018; Miss World Namibia 2025
- Hair color: Black
- Eye color: Brown
- Major competitions: Miss Namibia 2018 (Winner); Miss Universe 2018 (Unplaced); Miss World 2025 (Top 8)

Selma Carlicia Kamanya (born December 31, 1996, in Windhoek) is a Namibian model and beauty pageant titleholder who won Miss Namibia 2018 on July 7, 2018. She represented Namibia at Miss Universe 2018 and Miss World 2025 pageant.

== Pageantry ==
=== Miss Namibia and Miss Universe 2018 ===
Kamanya was crowned Miss Namibia on 7 July 2018 at the Windhoek Country Club, succeeding the 2017 titleholder, Suné January. As the national titleholder, she represented Namibia at the Miss Universe 2018 pageant in Bangkok, Thailand, where she did not place among the finalists.

=== Miss World 2025 ===
In 2025, Kamanya was appointed to represent Namibia at the 72nd Miss World pageant held in Telangana, India, replacing the originally selected delegate, Albertina Haimbala. During the preliminary events, she secured an automatic spot in the top 40 quarterfinals after winning the Miss World Top Model challenge for the African continent. Her advancement to the quarterfinals marked the first time a Namibian delegate passed the preliminary rounds at Miss World since Odile Gertze reached the top 25 in 2010.

At the final coronation night on 31 May 2025 at the HITEX Exhibition Centre in Hyderabad, Kamanya advanced through the subsequent elimination rounds before being eliminated prior to the top 4 segment, concluding her participation in the top 8. This was the highest placement for the country at the competition since Michelle McLean reached the top 5 in 1991.

Awards and achievements
Preceded by Suné January	Miss Namibia; 2018	Succeeded by Nadja Breytenbach
