= Miss Earth Sri Lanka =

Beauty contest

Pulse offmarks Miss Sri Lanka Earth
- Formation: 2011
- Type: Beauty Pageant
- Headquarters: Colombo
- Location: Sri Lanka
- Members: Miss Earth
- Official language: Sinhala; Tamil
- Website: Official website

Miss Earth Sri Lanka is a pageant in Sri Lanka to choose ambassador for the Miss Earth pageant.

== History ==
Sri Lanka debut in 2011 at Miss Earth pageant by TV Derana Production. Miss Earth Sri Lanka in under organization who mentioned other International pageants for Sri Lanka, its including; Miss Earth, Miss Globe INternational. Top Model of the World, Miss Intercontinental pageant and Miss Tourism World.

=== Requirements ===
Entries for the pageant are now being accepted for girls between the ages of 17–25 with a minimum height of 5ft 4in. The best 12 will be chosen for the pageant. All our contestants will go through rigorous training programs aided by experts from the fields of fashion and beauty.

TV Derana is prepared to bring all the exclusive footage surrounding our contestants' journey in the format of a reality TV show spanning 3 months. The show will lead up to a gala event at which the 5 brand ambassadors will be chosen by an elite group of judges.

== Titleholders ==
Color keys

- : Declared as Winner
- : Ended as runner-up or Top 5/6 qualification
- : Ended as one of the finalists or semi-finalists
- : Ended as special awards winner

Year	Miss Earth Sri Lanka	International placement	Special Award(s)	Ref.
2024	Hasani Kawya	Unplaced		
2023	Viyana Pietersz	Unplaced		
2022	Udani Nethmi Senanayake	Unplaced		
2021	Diandra Soysa	Unplaced		
2020	Romane Alvies	Unplaced		
2019	Did not compete			
2018	Nathasha Fernando	Unplaced		
2017	Shyama Dahanayaka	Unplaced		
2016	Dimanthi Edirirathna	Unplaced		
2015	Visna Fernando	Unplaced		
2014	Imaya Liyanage	Unplaced	(silver) Talent Competition; (silver) Yahoo! Beauty for a Cause; Eco-Beauty Video (Top 10)	
2013	Solange Kristina Gunawijeya	Unplaced		
2012	Chaturika Ariyawansha	Unplaced		
2011	Poojani Wakirigala	Unplaced		

== See also ==
- Miss Universe Sri Lanka
- Miss World Sri Lanka
- Miss Sri Lanka Online
