= Dushyanth Weeraman =

Sri Lankan, singer, dancer and actor (born 1983)

- Born: 7 June 1983 (age 43); Colombo, Sri Lanka
- Genres: Hip hop
- Occupations: Singer, Dancer, Actor
- Years active: 2013—present
- Spouse: Stephanie Siriwardhana
- Website: www.dushyanth.com

Dushyanth Weeraman is a Sri Lankan singer, dancer, and actor who gained recognition as the winner of the reality talent show "Sirasa Dancing Stars" in 2008. He received the Ten Outstanding Young Persons of Sri Lanka award in 2013. Weeraman is the founder, chairman, and director of Mango Friends Ambalangoda Yoluwo (Pvt) Ltd, which operates under the brand "Mango Friends," and the founder, chairman, and director of Wedding Master (Pvt) Ltd, which operates under the brand Magul.lk. He is the leader of the band Kurumba Music. He is the younger brother of Santhush Weeraman, one half of the Sri Lankan pop duo Bathiya and Santhush. Weeraman is married to Stephanie Siriwardhana, who represented Sri Lanka at Miss Universe 2011.

== Personal life ==
Dushyanth is married to Stephanie Siriwardhana, a former Miss Sri Lanka.

== Actor ==
Dushyanth has played numerous roles in local theater productions including the roles of "Raoul" in "The Phantom of the Opera, "Guttila" in "Guttila" and "Thomas" in "RAG". He debuted on the silver screen as lead character in the movie Dancing Star (film) with additional credits on the film's soundtrack.

== Discography ==
Year	Song	Film/Album/Single	Music Director	Language	Ref
2007	Pana Senehasa	Iraj	Iraj Weeraratne	Sinhala	
2007	Jeththu None	Karaliya	Dush	Sinhala	
2010	Vasana Lovak			Sinhala	
2011	Dedunna Wage	Dedunan Wage	Rasantha M	Sinhala	
2011	Mathake Hasarel	Mathake Hasarel	Dushyanth Weeraman	Sinhala	
2012	Just the fact Ft. Sonu Nigam	Just the fact	Aadesh Shrivastava/Dushyanth	Hindi/English	
2012	Ahanna Adare Tharam	Ahanna Adare Tharam	Radeesh Vandebona	Sinhala	
2013	Nelum Vilen Pena	Karaliya	Ravi Hans	Sinhala/English	
2014	Obawa Mata Himi Na	Obawa Mata Himi Na	Chamath Sangeeth	Sinhala	
2017	Omari Latha	Omari Latha	Pasan Liyanage	Sinhala	
2018	Ma Neth Pura		Chamath Sangeeth	Sinhala	
