= Miss South Africa 2026 =

68th Miss South Africa Pageant

- Date: 14 November 2026
- Presenters: Lawrence Maleka; Jo-Ann Strauss
- Entertainment: Soweto Gospel Choir; Zee Nxumalo; Young Stunna
- Venue: Sandton Convention Centre, Johannesburg, South Africa
- Broadcaster: Mzansi Magic
- Sponsor: Empower Youth Africa; Mzansi Magic; Sun International; Motsepe Foundation; Tricolt; Nungu Diamonds
- Entrants: 24
- Placements: 19
- Winner: Tiyani Makamu; Gauteng

Miss South Africa 2026 was the 68th edition of the Miss South Africa pageant, held at Sandton Convention Centre in Johannesburg, South Africa, on 14 November 2026.

It was hosted by television presenter and actor Lawrence Maleka, with Miss South Africa 2000 Jo-Ann Strauss, while Kuhle Adams and Katleho Sinivasan hosted the red carpet.

The contest was won by Tiyani Makamu of Gauteng, who was crowned Miss South Africa 2026 by Qhawekazi Mazaleni of Eastern Cape. The first runner-up was Cwenga Koyana Kotu-Rammopo of Gauteng, and the second runner-up was Lesego Khumo Nyathela of Gauteng.

The pageant attracted some controversy, including the gold colored temporary crown, the retirement of the iconic Mowana diamond crown and broader backstage changes following the pageant's acquisition.

== Background ==
=== Location and date ===
Miss South Africa 2026 was held at Sandton Convention Centre in Johannesburg, South Africa, on 14 November 2026.

=== Selection of contestants ===
Miss South Africa 2026 was the 68th edition of the Miss South Africa national beauty pageant. The 2026 pageant marked a highly discussed era for the organisation under its ownership by Motsepe Foundation with Precious Moloi-Motsepe through Empower Youth Africa. The applications for the 2026 title officially opened on 28 April 2026, inviting eligible South African women between the ages of 20 and 32 to apply on their official website. The top 24 finalists was announced on 6 June 2026. The Miss South Africa organisation announced their semi-finals judging panels on 26 June. The judges includes former Miss South Africa 2020 Shudufhadzo Musida, co-founder and CEO of Pandora Health Dr Aisha Pandor and Colleen Larson. On 19 August, the top 19 was announced by Minnie Dlamini.

== Results ==
=== Placements ===
Placement	Contestant
Miss South Africa 2026	Tiyani Makamu
1st Runner-Up	Cwenga Koyana Kotu-Rammopo
2nd Runner-Up	Lesego Khumo Nyathela
Top 5	Makhosazana Masango; Simoné Nonhlanhla Tshituka
Top 12	Alia Khan Koumantarakis; Amogelang Bunu; Bonolo Marang Motau; Katlego Malebye; Ndiwanga Muravha; Palesa van Rooyen; Zoalize Jansen van Rensburg
Top 19	Ipeleng Pearl Madiba; Kaylan Matthews; Kendra Norah Horne; Modiegi Mashamaite; Sanelisiwe Diko; Sunshine Dlangamandla; Tebogo Palesa Molatlhegi

== Pageant ==
=== Format ===
The Miss South Africa 2026 competition began with an application and selection process which was open to only eligible South African women between the ages of 20 to 32, even married women and mothers are allowed to enter the competition starting from this year . Following the application period, 24 contestants were selected to compete in the pageant. The contestants participated in the semi-final stage, where they were evaluated by a judging panel. The competition was subsequently narrowed down to a Top 19, which was announced on 19 August 2026. On 28 October, Top 12 was announced. The finalists continued through the remaining stages of the competition, concluding with in the selection of the Miss South Africa 2026 titleholder, who will be crowned by the reigning Miss South Africa, Qhawekazi Mazaleni of the Eastern Cape.

=== Judges ===
==== Semi-final ====
- Shudufhadzo Musida – Miss South Africa 2020
- Dr Aisha Pandor – co-founder and CEO of Pandora Health
- Colleen Larson – businesswoman

==== Final ====
- Thuli Madonsela – Advocate and professor of law
- Natasha Joubert – Miss South Africa 2023
- Dr Musa Mthombeni – Television host, actor and doctor
- Pumla Molope – President of African Women Chartered Accountants (AWCA)

=== Broadcast ===
With the theme "From Imbokodo to Diamond", the pageant aired on 14 November 2026 on DStv, Mzansi Magic Channel 161. Television presenter and actor Lawrence Maleka served as the presenter with former Miss South Africa 2000 titleholder Jo-Ann Strauss, while Kuhle Adams and Katleho Sinivasan hosted the red carpet. Soweto Gospel Choir opened the event, Zee Nxumalo and Young Stunna performed at the event.

=== Designers ===
House of Nala brought together established and designers, including David Tlale, Craig Port, Gavin Rajah, Sello Medupe and Orapeleng Modutle, alongside NALA Privé designers Loice Dube, Keneuoe Mhletswa and Samkelo Xaba.

== Contestants ==
The Top 24 contestants are as follows:

Delegate	Age	Province	Hometown
Alia Khan Koumantarakis	21	KwaZulu-Natal	Durban
Amogelang Bunu	27	Gauteng	Mabopane
Bonolo Marang Motau	27	Gauteng	Johannesburg
Cwenga Koyana Kotu-Rammopo	27	Gauteng	
Gift Ntimani	24	Gauteng	Atteridgeville
Ipeleng Pearl Madiba	23	North West	Rustenburg
Katlego Malebye	31	Gauteng	Pretoria
Kaylan Matthews	30	Eastern Cape	Gqeberha
Kendra Norah Horne	29	Western Cape	Hermanus
Lesego Khumo Nyathela	30	Gauteng	Springs
Makhosazana Masango	25	KwaZulu-Natal	Ndwedwe
Modiegi Mashamaite	27	Gauteng	Springs
Ndiwanga Muravha	22	Mpumalanga	Mbombela
Nongcebo Mngadi	22	KwaZulu-Natal	Durban
Ofentse Palesa Precious Motaung	22	Gauteng	Johannesburg
Palesa van Rooyen	30	Free State	Hobhouse
Sanelisiwe Diko	26	Eastern Cape	
Sibahle Ngwenya	28	KwaZulu-Natal	
Simoné Nonhlanhla Tshituka	26	Gauteng	Johannesburg
Sunshine Dlangamandla	29	Gauteng	Springs
Tebogo Palesa Molatlhegi	29	Gauteng	
Tiyani Makamu	27	Gauteng	Bronkhorstspruit
Unami Mthethwa	29	KwaZulu-Natal	Johannesburg
Zoalize Jansen van Rensburg	20	Gauteng	Pretoria

== Controversy ==
The Miss South Africa Organisation faced criticism on social media over the design and craftsmanship of the new "Imbokodo" headpiece worn by winner Tiyani Makamu. The absence of the pageant's established "Mowana" crown also attracted criticism. On 15 November, former crown sponsor Nungu Diamonds distanced itself from the new headpiece, stating that its partnership with the organisation had ended following unsuccessful contract negotiations. The company confirmed that it had nevertheless allowed the organisers to use the "Mowana" crown for the 2026 ceremony.

The Miss South Africa Organisation subsequently described the "Imbokodo" headpiece as a temporary ceremonial crown created in line with the 2026 pageant theme, "From Imbokodo to Diamond".
