= Poojana Dandeniya =

Sri Lankan actor

- පූජන දන්දෙණිය
- Born: 23 March 1989 (age 37)
- Education: Maithripala Senanayake National School; Anuradhapura Central College
- Occupation: Actor
- Years active: 2011–present
- Website: poojanadandeniya.com

Poojana Dandeniya (පූජන දන්දෙණිය) is a Sri Lankan actor who works in theatre, television and Sinhala-language cinema. He received the Sumathi Best Teledrama Supporting Actor Award for his portrayal of Pushpakumara in the television drama Sakarma, which was recognised for the 2021 television year. His film roles include Sihina Sameekarana (2024) and the leading role in Father (2026).

== Early life and training ==
Dandeniya grew up in Medawachchiya, Sri Lanka, and attended Maithripala Senanayake National School and Anuradhapura Central College. He took part in school drama productions, trained in theatre under Saman Pushpakumara, and was selected for a drama programme run by the National Youth Services Council. He moved to Colombo in 2011 for further training and became involved with the theatre institution founded by Somalatha Subasinghe, where he worked with Kaushalya Fernando.

== Career ==
=== Theatre ===
Dandeniya's early stage work included prompting for Piyal Kariyawasam's Rahas Udaviya (Secretive People), presented at the Lionel Wendt Art Centre in 2012. He subsequently performed in Fernando's MassK (2014), a Sinhala production of Henrik Ibsen's An Enemy of the People. The cast was drawn from the 2013 drama and theatre diploma cohort at the Lanka Children's and Youth Theatre Foundation. He also appeared in Fernando's Dutu Thena Allanu, an adaptation of Wole Soyinka's Opera Wonyosi, staged in 2015.

=== Television ===
His first television role was in Rukmal Niroshan's Sulanga Matha Mohothak, for which he was recruited through Kaushalya Fernando. His subsequent television credits included Hasthi Raja Manthraya (2016), Ravana (2018) and Queen (2019).

Dandeniya played the character Dodhu Sira in Pradeep Dharmadasa's Thriloka, a television miniseries first broadcast in December 2018. He later appeared in Giridevi, Sakarma, Once Upon a Time in Colombo, Meeya and Massa. In Massa, he portrayed Sampath, also known as Topiya. His performance as Pushpakumara in Sakarma earned him the Sumathi Award for Best Supporting Actor for 2021. The ceremony covering the 2020 and 2021 television seasons took place on 9 February 2023. He received a Special Jury Award at the 2022 Raigam Tele'es for his portrayal of Jude in Once Upon a Time in Colombo.

=== Film ===
Dandeniya starred alongside Pasan Ranaweera in Anomaa Rajakaruna's short film Forward Drive, which was selected for competition at the 2022 Hanoi International Film Festival. He appeared as Asanka in Sasika Herath's Sihina Sameekarana, released in Sri Lanka on 17 May 2024.

He played Desmond Gunasekara in the crime film Father, directed by Chaminda Jayasuriya and released in January 2026. He was also part of the cast of Shirley Samarasinghe's Sililare, which had its world premiere at the UK Asian Film Festival in London on 5 May 2026.

His short film My Dear Fish Tank was nominated in the Best Experimental Film category at the 2025 Agenda 14 Short Film Festival.

=== Critical reception ===
Writing for Mirror Arts in July 2024, Chanuka Vitharana contrasted Dandeniya's portrayals of antagonists in Massa and Once Upon a Time in Colombo. The critic particularly commended his depiction of Sampath in Massa and his ability to convey an angry character in a comparatively brief appearance in Adungira. In a March 2026 review of Father, Malintha Vithanage praised the distinctiveness of Dandeniya's voice and facial expressions, describing them as indicators of his potential as a screen performer.

== Selected filmography ==
=== Films ===
Year	Title	Role or credit	Notes	Reference
2022	Forward Drive	Actor	Short film; screened at the Hanoi International Film Festival	
2024	Sihina Sameekarana	Asanka	Feature film	
2025	My Dear Fish Tank	Short film	Nominated for Best Experimental Film	
2026	Father	Desmond Gunasekara	Feature film	
2026	Sililare	Actor	Festival premiere in May 2026	

=== Television ===
Year	Title	Role (where documented)	Reference
2016	Hasthi Raja Manthraya		
2018	Ravana		
2018	Thriloka	Dodhu Sira	
2019	Queen		
2020	Giridevi		
2021	Sakarma	Pushpakumara	
2021	Once Upon a Time in Colombo	Jude	
2023	Meeya	Roshan	
2023	Massa	Sampath (Topiya)	

== Awards and nominations ==
Award year	Award or festival	Category	Work	Result	Reference
2021	Sumathi Awards	Best Supporting Actor	Sakarma	Won	
2022	Raigam Tele'es	Special Jury Award	Once Upon a Time in Colombo	Won	
2025	Agenda 14 Short Film Festival	Best Experimental Film	My Dear Fish Tank	Nominated	
