= Ramani Bartholomeusz =

Sri Lankan actress and Miss Universe 1985 winner (1966–1987)

Ramani Bartholomeusz රමණි බර්තොලමියුස්
- Ramani Bartholomeusz
- Born: Ramani Elizabeth Bartholomeusz; 1 September 1966; Gampaha, Sri Lanka
- Died: 30 June 1987 (aged 20); Colombo, Sri Lanka
- Occupations: Actress, Model
- Beauty pageant titleholder
- Title: Miss Sri Lanka 1985
- Years active: 1983-1987
- Hair color: Black
- Eye color: Brown

Ramani Elizabeth Bartholomeusz (Sinhala: රමණි බර්තොලමියුස්; 1 September 1966 – 30 June 1987) was a Sri Lankan actress, model and beauty pageant titleholder.

== Pageantry ==
Bartholomeusz was crowned Miss Sri Lanka 1985, then represented Sri Lanka at Miss Universe 1985 pageant.

== Personal life ==
Ramani was born to Kamala and Leslie Mark Bartholomeusz in Gampaha. Her father Leslie was a well-known documentary film director, broadcaster, journalist and author. She had three sisters, Marie Bartholomeusz, Dileene Bartholomeusz, Reneira Bartholomeusz and one brother Mark Bartholomeusz. She completed her education at Holy Cross College, Gampaha.

== Acting career ==
At the age of 16, she was screened in Lester James Peiris's 1983 film Yuganthaya (English title: End of an Era) in the role of Chamari, alongside renowned actor Gamini Fonseka. After her appearance at the 1985 Miss Universe contest, Bartholomeusz continued in the acting field, as she appeared in Dharmasiri Bandaranayake's stage drama Makaraakshaya and paired with Kamal Addararachchi in television serial Himakumari.

Some of her most popular television acting came through Bhagya, where she co-acted with Ranjan Ramanayake. She was widely popularized with the song "Aju Thapara Lahila" sung by Deepika Priyadarshani. She also had a lead roles in Irata Hadana Mal, Himakumari, Salalihini Gammanaya and the Sinhala stage musical Vivanga written and directed by Surith Haykanda. In addition to film,television and stage, Ramani also appeared in the musical program Hada Bandi Gee with Rupavahini produced by Sunil Siriwardena, and in the visual for the song “Duras Wannata Me Lesin Ayda Apa Hamu Une” by Dayarathna Ranatunga.

== Death ==
Bartholomeusz died on 30 June 1987, at the age of 20. She died in ICU following an accident.

== Filmography ==
=== Films ===
Year	Film	Role	Ref.
1983	Yuganthaya	Chamari Kabalana	
1987	Sathyagrahanaya	Wedding Guest	

=== Television Serials ===
- Bhagya
- Himakumari
- Irata Hadana Mal
- Salalihini Gammanaya

=== Stage Dramas ===
- Makaraakshaya
- Vivanga

=== Music Videos ===
- "Duras Wannata Me Lesin"

=== Television Programmes ===
- Hada Bandi Gee

== Legacy ==
Twenty-one years after her death, Bartholomeusz was the cover feature for the 1st issue of Reel and Track Magazine.

Awards and achievements
Preceded by Nilmini Iddamalgoda	Miss Universe Sri Lanka; 1985	Succeeded by Indra Kumari
