= Shivani Vasagam Wedanayake =

Sri Lankan model and entrepreneur

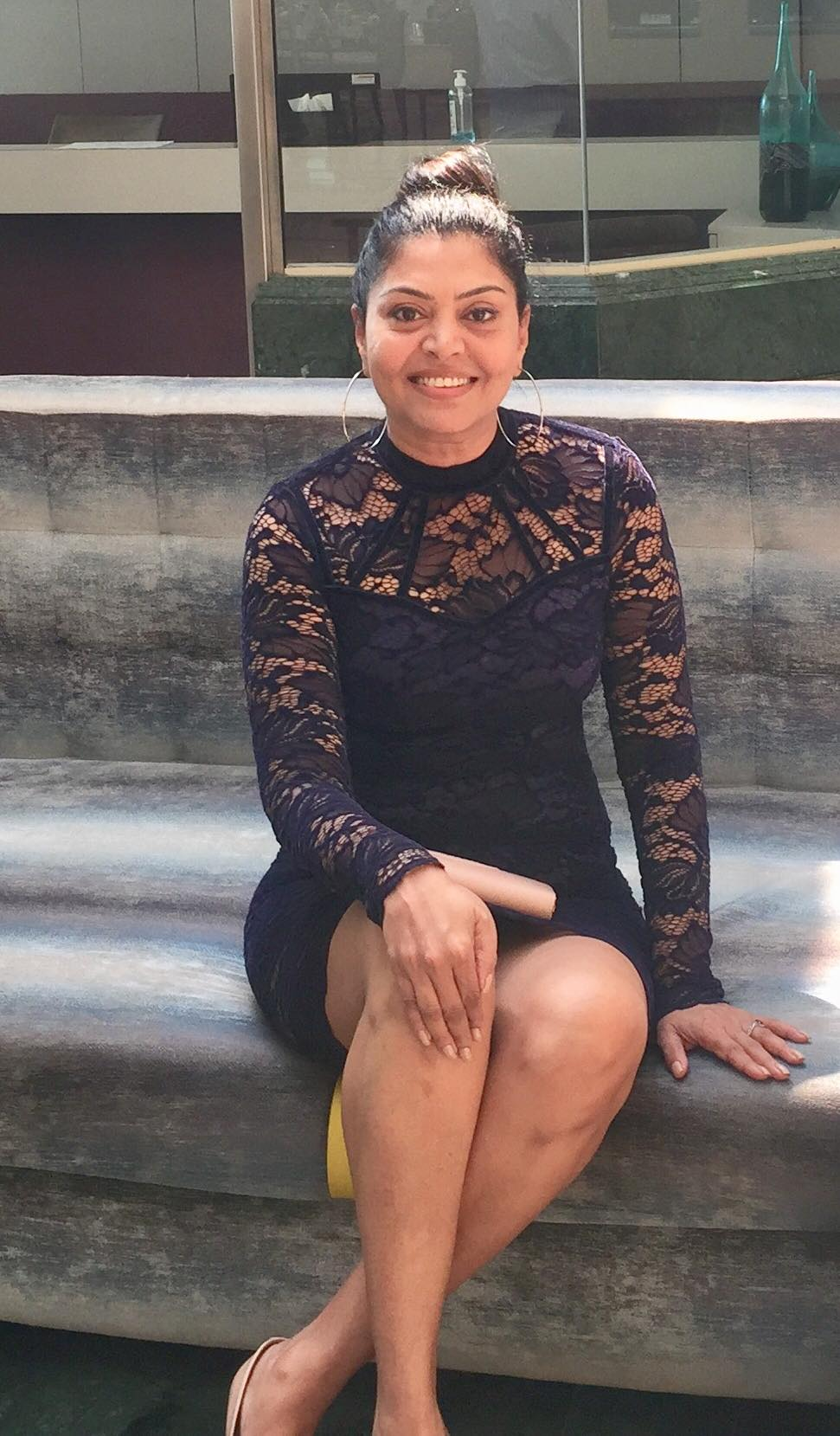
- Born: 25 February 1971 (age 55)
- Occupations: Model, Entrepreneur
- Height: 173 cm (5 ft 8 in)
- Spouse: Chaminda Wedanayake
- Children: Siddhantha Avishka(2000); Haresh Gautham(2003)
- Beauty pageant titleholder
- Title: Mrs Sri Lanka 1999
- Hair color: Dark Brown
- Eye color: Brown
- Major competitions: Model of the year 1992 (Winner); Miss Universe Sri Lanka 1995 (Winner); Mrs Sri Lanka 1999 (Winner); Mrs. World 1999-2000 (4th Runner Up)

Shivani Vasagam Wedanayake (born 25 February 1971) is a Sri Lankan model, entrepreneur and beauty pageant titleholder. Wedanayake (née Vasagam) is the daughter of the cinematographer A. V. m Vasagam, and forayed into the fashion and beauty industry encouraged by her father to follow the tradition in the entertainment and field of arts. She is also a published poet with the National Library of North American poets.

== Early life ==
Wedanayake was educated at Bishop's College, Colombo.She is also a HarvardX certified Entrepreneurship in Emerging Economies. She started her career as a model in 1991 when a fashion photographer discovered her while walking in her home town of Colombo. Having persuaded her to model, she enrolled herself in Senaka De Silva school of Catwalk and Photographic modeling and embarked on a successful career as a fashion and photographic model.

== Model ==
She won the Model of the Year in 1992, which established her as a supermodel. She has modeled for Senaka De Silva, Lou Ching Wong, Chrys Fernandopulle, Dinesh Chandrasena, Andre Estefan, Dhammika Amerasekera, Mangala Innocence, Mariposa, Odel, Buddhi Batiks Eric sooriyasena amongst others and was a Fit model for Victoria's Secret.

Having established as a front runner she was invited to open many shows and was the most photographed cover girl in the country in the 1990s. Through the ‘Shades of Sri Lanka’ fashion show she has travelled to Belgium, Italy, France, Abu Dhabi, Oman promoting Sri Lanka's Batiks, Silks and Handlooms industries as a model. She also modeled for Tex Linen in India as a print model.

Her work as a print and television model included fronting the Odel Elephant orphanage, Axe Oil, Lakme cold cream, Lipton Tea promotion and Janome sewing machine working with leading photographers in the country including Gamini Saparamadu and Athula Mahawalage.

== Pageantry ==
Wedanayake was invited to represent her country at the Miss Asia Pacific Quest held in Manila, Philippines in 1993. Wedanayake competed for the Miss Universe Sri Lanka in 1995 pageant was held on 2 April 1995 at Kings Court, Trans Asia Hotel (now Cinnamon Lakeside), and won the competition and the right to represent her country at the Miss Universe 1995 pageant held on 12 May 1995 at the Windhoek country club and resort, Namibia. She received 9.13 for interview, 9.11 for evening gown and 8.52 for swimsuit during the preliminaries and was placed 22nd out of 82 countries.

In 1999 she took part in the Mrs. Sri Lanka and won the title of Mrs. World Sri Lanka held on 30 October 1999 at BMICH, and competed at the Mrs. World pageant held in Jerusalem, Israel. She competed with 48 countries and won the 4th runner-up place at the Mrs. World.

== Entrepreneur ==
Wedanayake co-founded WEB Syndicate, Sri Lanka's pioneer web design and development company with the birth of the Internet in 1996. Having established as a leader in the country the company provided cutting-edge technology for exporters Ceyon black tea, hotels such as the Confifi Group, conglomerates including the Stassen Group and multi-nationals Unilever through the World Wide Web. The company was the first to design, develop and deploy the country's fully integrated shopping cart facility for Dilmah tea and the first to build their fully owned state of the art design studio.

== See also ==
- Miss Universe Sri Lanka

Awards and achievements
Preceded by Nushara Fernando	Miss Universe Sri Lanka; 1995	Succeeded by Shivanthini Dharmasiri
