= Miss World 2025 =

72nd Miss World pageant, beauty pageant edition

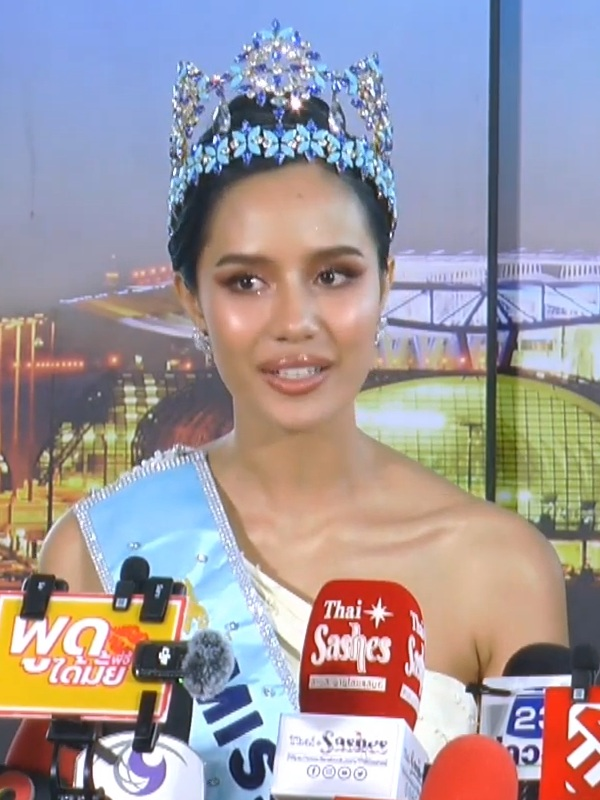
- Suchata Chuangsri
- Date: 31 May 2025
- Presenters: Sachiin Kumbhar; Stephanie Del Valle
- Entertainment: Ishaan Khatter; Jacqueline Fernandez
- Venue: HITEX Exhibition Centre, Hyderabad, Telangana, India
- Broadcaster: SonyLIV; StagePlayer+
- Entrants: 108
- Placements: 40
- Withdrawals: Costa Rica; Guinea-Bissau; Iraq; Lesotho; Liberia; Macau; Morocco; Norway; Slovakia; South Korea; Tanzania; Uruguay
- Returns: Albania; Armenia; Equatorial Guinea; Kyrgyzstan; Latvia; North Macedonia; Suriname; Zambia
- Winner: Suchata Chuangsri; Thailand

Miss World 2025 was the 72nd edition of the Miss World pageant, held at the HITEX Exhibition Centre in Hyderabad, Telangana, India, on 31 May 2025.

At the end of the event, Suchata Chuangsri of Thailand won the competition and succeeded Krystyna Pyszková of the Czech Republic. This is the first time Thailand has won in the history of the pageant and the second Southeast Asian country to capture the title after the Philippines in 2013. The first, second, third runner-ups were Ethiopia's Hasset Dereje, Poland's Maja Klajda and Martinique's Aurélie Joachim. 108 countries and territories participated in the competition.

The pageant was co-hosted by Miss World 2016, Stephanie Del Valle and Sachiin Kumbhar. Bollywood actors Jacqueline Fernandez and Ishaan Khatter performed in this edition.

== Overview ==
=== Location and date ===
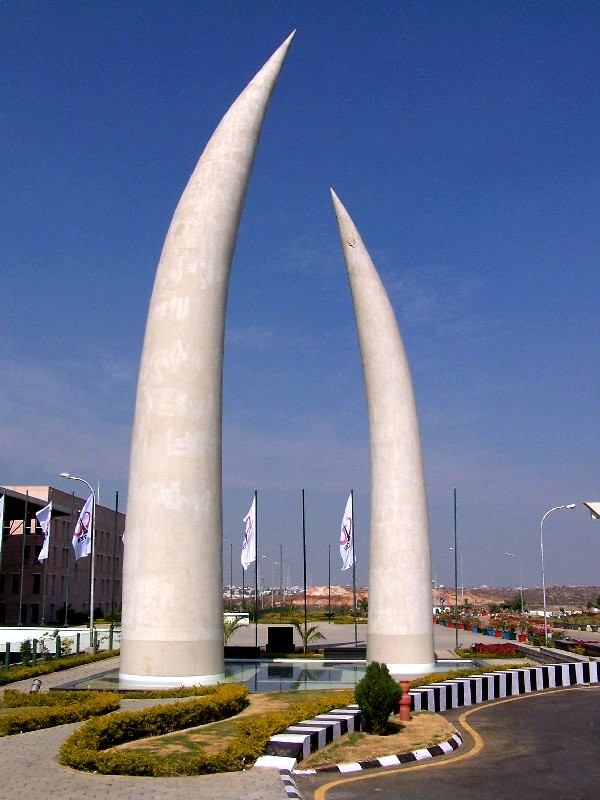
HITEX Exhibition Centre, the venue of the 72nd Miss World edition

On 19 February 2025, the organizers announced that the final event would take place on 31 May 2025 in Hyderabad, India. This was the third time the pageant was held in India, following Miss World 1996 and Miss World 2023.

=== Selection of participants ===
Contestants from one-hundred and eight countries and territories were selected to compete in the pageant.

==== Replacements ====
Several representatives either withdrew from the competition or were replaced for various reasons. The following are the confirmed changes:

Miss Czech Republic 2023, Justýna Zedníková, was replaced by Miss Czech Republic 2024, Adéla Štroffeková. Zedníková later participated in Miss Supranational 2024, where she was second runner-up. Miss Tunisia 2023, Amira Afli, was replaced by Miss Tunisia 2025, Lamis Redissi.

Noelia Hernandez of Belize withdrew from the competition for undisclosed reasons and was replaced by her first runner-up, Shayari Morataya. Miss Côte d'Ivoire 2024, Marie-Emmanuelle Diamala, was replaced by her first runner-up, Fatoumata Coulibaly. Miss World Cayman Islands 2024, Latecia Bush, was replaced by her second runner-up, Jada Ramoon.

Manita Hang of Cambodia withdrew for personal reasons, and replaced by Julia Russell.

Ariet Sanjarova of Kyrgyzstan withdrew for unspecified reasons and was replaced by Aizhan Chanacheva. Albertina Haimbala of Namibia stepped down from the competition for unknown reasons and was replaced by Selma Kamanya. Micaela Nikolalev of Moldova was replaced by Anghelina Chitaica, with no explanation provided.

Kimberly Joseph of Mauritius was replaced by Wenna Rumnah for unspecified reasons. Elvira Yordanova of Bulgaria withdrew from the competition after signing a contract with an organization not affiliated with Miss World Bulgaria, which led to her relinquishing her national title. She was replaced by Teodora Miltenova.

In some countries, new representatives were appointed after the reigning titleholders' terms concluded:

Miss Polonia 2024, Maja Klajda, replaced Ewa Jakubiec as Poland's representative after the end of Jakubiec's reign. Miss World Japan 2024, Kiana Tomita, succeeded Maya Negishi, the 2023 titleholder, who was unable to compete internationally due to the conclusion of her reign.

Ismeli Jarquín, originally crowned Miss World Nicaragua 2024, resigned for undisclosed reasons. She was replaced by her first runner-up, Julia Aguilar, who did not compete. Both were replaced by Miss World Nicaragua 2025, Virmania Rodríguez.

Milla Magee of England withdrew during the competition for ethical concerns, and was replaced by her first runner-up, Charlotte Grant.

==== Returns and withdrawals ====
This edition saw the returns of Suriname, which last competed in 2012; North Macedonia (as Macedonia) in 2015; Latvia and Zambia in 2018; Kyrgyzstan in 2019; and Albania, Armenia, and Equatorial Guinea in 2021.

Guinea-Bissau, Iraq, Liberia, Macau, Morocco, and Uruguay withdrew from the competition due to their respective national organizations failing to appoint a delegate, organize a national pageant, or retain the Miss World franchise.

Miss Lesotho 2023, Lerato Masila withdrew for undisclosed reasons. Tracy Nabukeera of Tanzania withdrew due to lack of sponsorship, Daniela Vojtasová of Slovakia cited academic commitments. Min Jung of South Korea withdrew due to an injury. Fabiola Vindas of Costa Rica withdrew after her national organization lost the Miss World franchise, and instead competed in Miss Supranational 2025. Nikoline Andresen of Norway withdrew due to scheduling conflicts and instead competed in Miss International 2025.

== Results ==
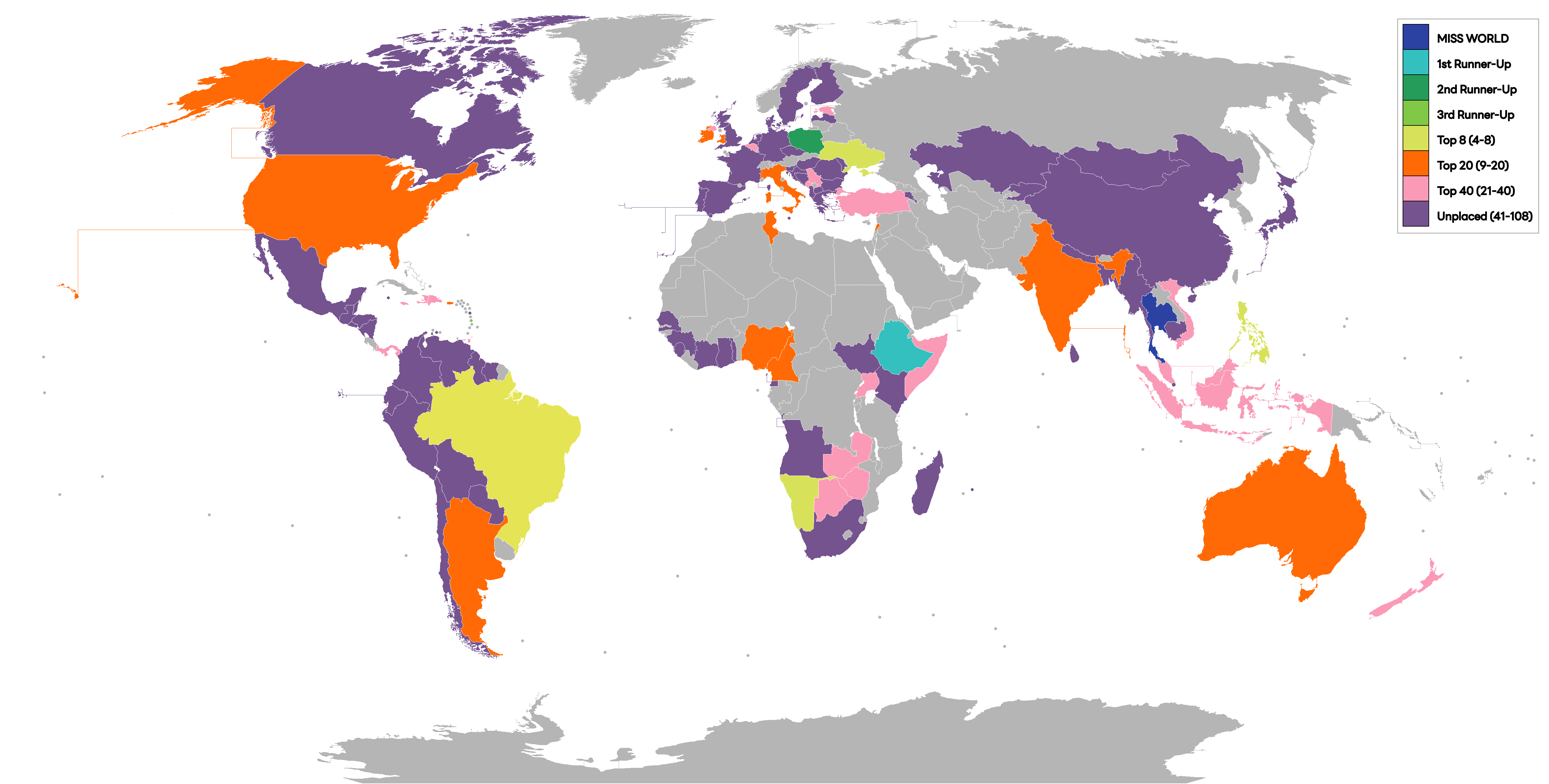
Miss world 2025 participating countries and territories

=== Placements ===
Placement	Contestant
Miss World 2025	Thailand – Suchata Chuangsri
1st Runner-Up	Ethiopia – Hasset Dereje
2nd Runner-Up	Poland – Maja Klajda
3rd Runner-Up	Martinique – Aurélie Joachim
Top 8	Brazil – Jéssica Pedroso; Namibia – Selma Kamanya; Philippines – Krishnah Gravidez; Ukraine – Mariia Melnychenko
Top 20	Argentina – Guadalupe Alomar; Australia – Jasmine Stringer; Cameroon – Princesse Issié; India – Nandini Gupta; Ireland – Jasmine Gerhardt; Italy – Chiara Esposito; Lebanon – Nada Koussa; Nigeria – Joy Raimi; Puerto Rico – Valeria Pérez; Tunisia – Lamis Redissi; United States – Athenna Crosby; Wales – Millie-Mae Adams
Top 40	Belgium – Karen Jansen; Botswana – Anicia Gaothusi; Dominican Republic – Mayra Delgado; Estonia – Eliise Randmaa; Haiti – Christee Guirand; Indonesia – Monica Sembiring; Jamaica – Tahje Bennett; Malaysia – Saroop Roshi; Montenegro – Andrea Nikolić; New Zealand – Samantha Poole; Northern Ireland – Hannah Johns; Panama – Karol Rodríguez; Serbia – Aleksandra Rutović; Somalia – Zainab Jama; Trinidad and Tobago – Anna-Lise Nanton; Turkey – İdil Bilgen; Uganda – Natasha Nyonyozi; Vietnam – Ý Nhi Huỳnh; Zambia – Faith Bwalya; Zimbabwe – Courtney Jongwe

==== Continental Queens of Beauty ====
The final pageant announced the Top 8 finalists composed of four continental winners and four first runners-up. The first runner-up from the new titleholder's continent was promoted to continental winner. After the finals concluded, the pageant awarded separately the titles for Caribbean and Oceania regions.

Continent/Region	Contestant
Africa	Ethiopia – Hasset Dereje
Americas	Brazil – Jéssica Pedroso
Asia	Philippines – Krishnah Gravidez
Caribbean	Martinique – Aurélie Joachim
Europe	Poland – Maja Klajda
Oceania	Australia – Jasmine Stringer

==== Special Award ====
The Miss World Organization has announced that actor and founder of the Sood Charity Foundation, Sonu Sood, will be presented with the prestigious Humanitarian Award at the Grand Finale.

Award	Recipient
Humanitarian Award	Sonu Sood

== Pageant ==
=== Format ===
Miss World uses a continent-based format. Ten contestants from each of the four regions—Africa, the Americas and the Caribbean, Asia and Oceania, and Europe—advance to the Top 40, including Fast Track winners who qualify automatically. Judges then select a Top 5 from each region, forming a Top 20, which is further narrowed to a Top 2 per region. The four regional winners become the overall Top 4 finalists. One of them is crowned Miss World, while the others are named first, second, and third runners-up.

=== Selection committee ===
- Donna Walsh — Official stage director for 72nd Miss World
- Dr. Carina Tyrrell — Public health physician, philanthropist, investor, Fellow at the University of Cambridge, and Miss England 2014
- Julia Morley — Chairman and CEO of Miss World Organization
- Manushi Chhillar — Indian actress, model, and Miss World 2017 from India
- Namrata Shirodkar — Indian actress
- Rana Daggubati — Indian actor, producer and entrepreneur
- Shri Jayesh Ranjan Ias — Special Indian chief secretary government of Telangana
- Sonu Sood — Indian actor, film producer, model, humanitarian, and philanthropist
- Sudha Reddy — Indian businesswoman, entrepreneur, and philanthropist

== Challenge Events ==
=== Sports Challenge ===
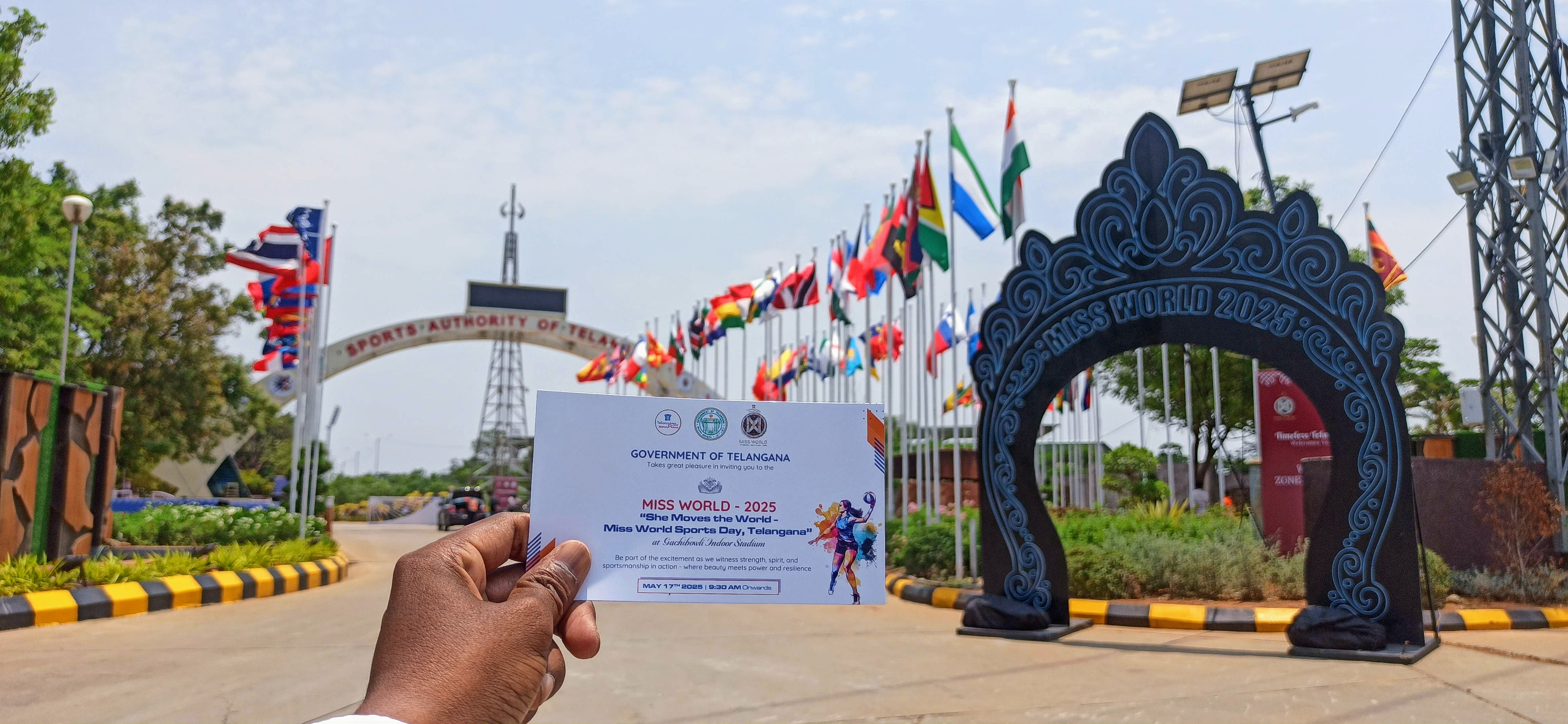
MISS WORLD - 2025 She Moves The World - Miss World Sports Day, Telangana Event Passes

The Sports Challenge finale took place at Gachibowli Stadium on 17 May, where all the contestants competed for a place among this year's quarter-finalists, and a spot in the Top 10 of the winner's continental region.

- Advanced to the Top 40 via Sports Challenge.

Placement	Continent/Team	Contestant
Winner	Europe (Blue Team)	Estonia – Eliise Randmaa
2nd place	Americas and Caribbean (Green Team)	Martinique – Aurélie Joachim
3rd place	Americas and Caribbean (Green Team)	Canada – Emma Morrison
4th place	Americas and Caribbean (Green Team)	Trinidad and Tobago – Anna-Lise Nanton
Top 32 (Continental Qualifiers)	Africa (Yellow Team)	Angola – Núria Assis; Botswana – Anicia Gaothusi; Ethiopia – Hasset Dereje; Kenya – Grace Ramtu; Namibia – Selma Kamanya; Nigeria – Joy Raimi; Somalia – Zainab Jama; Zimbabwe – Courtney Jongwe
Top 32 (Continental Qualifiers)	Americas and Caribbean (Green Team)	Curaçao – Shubrainy Dams; El Salvador – Sofía Estupinián; Guatemala – Jeimy Escobedo; Mexico – Maryely Leal; Nicaragua – Virmania Rodríguez
Top 32 (Continental Qualifiers)	Asia and Oceania (Red Team)	Australia – Jasmine Stringer; Indonesia – Monica Sembiring; Japan – Kiana Tomita; Mongolia – Erdenesuvd Batbayar; New Zealand – Samantha Poole; Philippines – Krishnah Gravidez; Singapore – Delvina Katerina Luther; Turkey – İdil Bilgen
Top 32 (Continental Qualifiers)	Europe (Blue Team)	Belgium – Karen Jansen; Bulgaria – Teodora Miltenova; France – Agathe Cauet; Ireland – Jasmine Gerhardt; Netherlands – Jane Knoetser; Northern Ireland – Hannah Johns; Slovenia – Alida Tomanič

=== Talent Challenge ===
In the talent challenge, continental qualifier contestants showcased their skills in music, dance, and art. The finalists returned to the Talent Challenge in Shilpakala Vedika on 22 May. The winner of the segment was advanced to the overall Top 10 in her respective continental group.

- Advanced to the Top 40 via Talent Challenge.

Placement		Candidate
Winner		Indonesia – Monica Sembiring
2nd place		Cameroon – Princesse Issié
3rd place		Italy – Chiara Esposito
Top 24		Argentina – Guadalupe Alomar; Australia – Jasmine Stringer; Brazil – Jéssica Pedroso; Cayman Islands – Jada Ramoon; Czech Republic – Adéla Štroffeková; Estonia – Eliise Randmaa; Ethiopia – Hasset Dereje; Germany – Silvia Dörre Sánchez; India – Nandini Gupta; Ireland – Jasmine Gerhardt; Jamaica – Tahje Bennett; Kenya – Grace Ramtu; Malta – Martine Cutajar; Netherlands – Jane Knoester; Nigeria – Joy Raimi; Philippines – Krishnah Gravidez; Sri Lanka – Anudi Gunasekara; Trinidad and Tobago – Anna-Lise Nanton; United States – Athenna Crosby; Wales – Millie-Mae Adams
Top 48 (Continental Qualifiers)	Africa	Angola – Núria Assis; Botswana – Anicia Gaothusi; Equatorial Guinea – Estela Nguema Mangue; Tunisia – Lamis Redissi; Zambia – Faith Bwalya
Top 48 (Continental Qualifiers)	Americas and Caribbean	Martinique – Aurélie Joachim; Paraguay – Yanina Gómez; Puerto Rico – Valeria Pérez; Suriname – Chenella Rozendaal
Top 48 (Continental Qualifiers)	Asia and Oceania	Armenia – Adrine Achemyan; Bangladesh – Aklima Atika Konika; Cambodia – Julia Russell; China – Wanting Liu; Kazakhstan – Sabina Idrissova; Malaysia – Saroop Roshi; Myanmar – Khisa Khin; Vietnam – Ý Nhi Huỳnh
Top 48 (Continental Qualifiers)	Europe	Gibraltar – Shania Ballester; Greece – Stella Michailidou; Latvia – Marija Mišurova; Moldova – Anghelina Chitaica; Montenegro – Andrea Nikolić; Poland – Maja Klajda; Serbia – Aleksandra Rutović; Slovenia – Alida Tomanič

=== Head-to-Head Challenge ===
Presentations began on 20 May; all delegates introduced themselves during one-on-one discussions on global issues as part of the Head-to-Head Challenge. This event showcased the participants' intellectual abilities, confidence, and communication skills. The shortlisted delegates competed in the final round, which was held on 23 May at the Hotel Trident.

- Advanced to the Top 40 via Head-to-Head Challenge.

Placement	Continent	Contestant
Winners	Africa	Zambia – Faith Bwalya
Winners	Americas and Caribbean	Trinidad and Tobago – Anna-Lise Nanton
Winners	Asia and Oceania	Turkey – İdil Bilgen
Winners	Europe	Wales – Millie-Mae Adams
Top 8	Africa	Namibia – Selma Kamanya
Top 8	Americas and Caribbean	Brazil – Jéssica Pedroso
Top 8	Asia and Oceania	Thailand – Suchata Chuangsri
Top 8	Europe	Ireland – Jasmine Gerhardt
Top 20 (Continental Qualifiers)	Africa	Somalia – Zainab Jama; South Africa – Zoalize Jansen van Rensburg; Uganda – Natasha Nyonyozi
Top 20 (Continental Qualifiers)	Americas and Caribbean	Cayman Islands – Jada Ramoon; Guyana – Zalika Samuels; Suriname – Chenella Rozendaal
Top 20 (Continental Qualifiers)	Asia and Oceania	Japan – Kiana Tomita; Lebanon – Nada Koussa; Sri Lanka – Anudi Gunasekara
Top 20 (Continental Qualifiers)	Europe	France – Agathe Cauet; Germany – Silvia Dörre Sánchez; Spain – Corina Mrazek

=== Top Model Challenge ===
The Miss World Top Model Challenge was held on 24 May.

- Advanced to the Top 40 via Top Model Challenge.

Placement	Continent	Contestant
Winners	Africa	Namibia – Selma Kamanya
Winners	Americas and Caribbean	Martinique – Aurélie Joachim
Winners	Asia and Oceania	India – Nandini Gupta
Winners	Europe	Ireland – Jasmine Gerhardt
Top 8 (Continental Qualifiers)	Africa	Côte d'Ivoire – Fatoumata Coulibaly
Top 8 (Continental Qualifiers)	Americas and Caribbean	Venezuela – Valeria Cannavò
Top 8 (Continental Qualifiers)	Asia and Oceania	New Zealand – Samantha Poole
Top 8 (Continental Qualifiers)	Europe	Belgium – Karen Jansen

==== Best Designer Dress ====
Continent	Contestant
Africa	South Africa – Zoalize Jansen van Rensburg
Americas and Caribbean	Puerto Rico – Valeria Pérez
Asia and Oceania	New Zealand – Samantha Poole
Europe	Ukraine – Mariia Melnychenko

=== Beauty With a Purpose ===
On 26 May, the Beauty with Purpose presentations at HITEX Exhibition Centre spotlighted social service projects led by contestants.

- Advanced to the Top 40 via Beauty With a Purpose.

Placement	Continent	Contestant
Winner	Asia and Oceania	Indonesia – Monica Sembiring
Top 4 (Continental Winners)	Africa	Uganda – Natasha Nyonyozi
Top 4 (Continental Winners)	Americas and Caribbean	Puerto Rico – Valeria Pérez
Top 4 (Continental Winners)	Europe	Wales – Millie-Mae Adams
Top 8 (Continental Qualifiers)	Africa	Sierra Leone – Lachaeveh Davies
Top 8 (Continental Qualifiers)	Americas and Caribbean	Paraguay – Yanina Gómez
Top 8 (Continental Qualifiers)	Asia and Oceania	Vietnam – Ý Nhi Huỳnh
Top 8 (Continental Qualifiers)	Europe	Spain – Corina Mrazek

=== Multimedia Challenge ===
The Multimedia Challenge highlights contestants as effective digital communicators. Each year, contestants are chosen based on their social media activity, reach, and influence. Selected for their creativity, consistency, and positive messaging, they use platforms like Instagram, the Miss World app, and national Facebook pages to share their journeys, amplify meaningful causes, and connect with global audiences.

- Advanced to the Top 40 via Multimedia Challenge.

Placement	Continent	Contestant
Winners	Africa	Cameroon – Princesse Issié
Winners	Americas and Caribbean	Dominican Republic – Mayra Delgado
Winners	Asia and Oceania	Thailand – Suchata Chuangsri
Winners	Europe	Montenegro – Andrea Nikolić
Top 8 (Runners-Up)	Africa	South Africa – Zoalize Jansen van Rensburg
Top 8 (Runners-Up)	Americas and Caribbean	Brazil – Jéssica Pedroso
Top 8 (Runners-Up)	Asia and Oceania	Sri Lanka – Anudi Gunasekara
Top 8 (Runners-Up)	Europe	Northern Ireland – Hannah Johns
Top 20 (Continental Qualifiers)	Africa	Namibia – Selma Kamanya; Uganda – Natasha Nyonyozi; Zimbabwe – Courtney Jongwe
Top 20 (Continental Qualifiers)	Americas and Caribbean	Canada – Emma Morrison; Mexico – Maryely Leal; Venezuela – Valeria Cannavò
Top 20 (Continental Qualifiers)	Asia and Oceania	New Zealand – Samantha Poole; Philippines – Krishnah Gravidez; Vietnam – Ý Nhi Huỳnh
Top 20 (Continental Qualifiers)	Europe	France – Agathe Cauet; Greece – Stella Michailidou; Poland – Maja Klajda

== Contestants ==
108 contestants competed for the title.

Country/Territory	Contestant	Age (Note: Ages at the time of the pageant)	Hometown	Continental Group
Albania	Elona Ndrecaj	25	Tirana	Europe
Angola	Núria Assis	30	Luanda	Africa
Argentina	Guadalupe Alomar	21	Rosario	Americas and Caribbean
Armenia	Adrine Achemyan	19	Yerevan	Asia and Oceania
Australia	Jasmine Stringer	27	Gold Coast	Asia and Oceania
Bangladesh	Aklima Atika Konika	26	Dhaka	Asia and Oceania
Belgium	Karen Jansen	23	Lommel	Europe
Belize	Shayari Morataya	23	Belize City	Americas and Caribbean
Bolivia	Olga Chávez	21	Santa Cruz de la Sierra	Americas and Caribbean
Bosnia and Herzegovina	Ena Adrović	21	Živinice	Europe
Botswana	Anicia Gaothusi	22	Tutume	Africa
Brazil	Jéssica Pedroso	25	Piracicaba	Americas and Caribbean
Bulgaria	Teodora Miltenova	24	Petrich	Europe
Cambodia	Julia Russell	18	Phnom Penh	Asia and Oceania
Cameroon	Princesse Issié	24	Douala	Africa
Canada	Emma Morrison	24	Chapleau	Americas and Caribbean
Cayman Islands	Jada Ramoon	26	Bodden Town	Americas and Caribbean
Chile	Francisca Lavandero	25	Los Ángeles	Americas and Caribbean
China	Wanting Liu	22	Weifang	Asia and Oceania
Colombia	Catalina Quintero	24	Leticia	Americas and Caribbean
(Ivory Coast) Côte d'Ivoire	Fatoumata Coulibaly	21	Gontougo	Africa
Croatia	Tomislava Dukić	26	Tomislavgrad	Europe
Curaçao	Shubrainy Dams	23	Willemstad	Americas and Caribbean
Czech Republic	Adéla Štroffeková	22	Prague	Europe
Denmark	Emma Heyst	22	Tolne	Europe
Dominican Republic	Mayra Delgado	23	Santo Domingo	Americas and Caribbean
Ecuador	Sandra Alvarado	24	Santo Domingo	Americas and Caribbean
El Salvador	Sofía Estupinián	25	Santa Ana	Americas and Caribbean
England	Charlotte Grant	25	Liverpool	Europe
Equatorial Guinea	Estela Nguema Mangue	23	Acurenam	Africa
Estonia	Eliise Randmaa	25	Türi	Europe
Ethiopia	Hasset Dereje	19	Addis Ababa	Africa
Finland	Sofia Singh	29	Helsinki	Europe
France	Agathe Cauet	26	Lille	Europe
Germany	Silvia Dörre Sánchez	28	Leipzig	Europe
Ghana	Jutta Addo	20	Central Region	Africa
Gibraltar	Shania Ballester	19	Gibraltar	Europe
Greece	Stella Michailidou	23	Thessaloniki	Europe
Guadeloupe	Noémie Milne	26	Baie-Mahault	Americas and Caribbean
Guatemala	Jeimy Escobedo	18	Mazatenango	Americas and Caribbean
Guinea	Kadiatou Savané	25	Conakry	Africa
Guyana	Zalika Samuels	21	Georgetown	Americas and Caribbean
Haiti	Christee Guirand	23	Port-au-Prince	Americas and Caribbean
Honduras	Izza Sevilla	19	La Ceiba	Americas and Caribbean
Hungary	Andrea Katzenbach	23	Kiskőrös	Europe
India	Nandini Gupta	22	Kota	Asia and Oceania
Indonesia	Monica Sembiring	23	Karo	Asia and Oceania
(Republic of Ireland) Ireland	Jasmine Gerhardt	25	Dublin	Europe
Italy	Chiara Esposito	22	Curti	Europe
Jamaica	Tahje Bennett	25	Kingston	Americas and Caribbean
Japan	Kiana Tomita	28	Tokyo	Asia and Oceania
Kazakhstan	Sabina Idrissova	22	Astana	Asia and Oceania
Kenya	Grace Ramtu	25	Nairobi	Africa
Kyrgyzstan	Aizhan Chanacheva	26	Naryn	Asia and Oceania
Latvia	Marija Mišurova	17	Riga	Europe
Lebanon	Nada Koussa	26	Rahbeh	Asia and Oceania
Madagascar	Cyria Temagnombe	23	Tsiroanomandidy	Africa
Malaysia	Saroop Roshi	26	Perak	Asia and Oceania
Malta	Martine Cutajar	25	Attard	Europe
Martinique	Aurélie Joachim	27	Ducos	Americas and Caribbean
Mauritius	Wenna Rumnah	22	Port Louis	Africa
Mexico	Maryely Leal	28	Guasave	Americas and Caribbean
Moldova	Anghelina Chitaica	22	Tiraspol	Europe
Mongolia	Erdenesuvd Batbayar	22	Ulaanbaatar	Asia and Oceania
Montenegro	Andrea Nikolić	21	Podgorica	Europe
Myanmar	Khisa Khin	17	Taw Kyawe Inn	Asia and Oceania
Namibia	Selma Kamanya	28	Windhoek	Africa
Nepal	Srichchha Pradhan	25	Kathmandu	Asia and Oceania
Netherlands	Jane Knoester	19	The Hague	Europe
New Zealand	Samantha Poole	22	Whangārei	Asia and Oceania
Nicaragua	Virmania Rodríguez	23	El Jicaral	Americas and Caribbean
Nigeria	Joy Raimi	24	Port Harcourt	Africa
North Macedonia	Charna Nevzati	20	Skopje	Europe
Northern Ireland	Hannah Johns	25	Belfast	Europe
Panama	Karol Rodríguez	23	Panama City	Americas and Caribbean
Paraguay	Yanina Gómez	28	Asunción	Americas and Caribbean
Peru	Staisy Huamansisa	20	Lima	Americas and Caribbean
Philippines	Krishnah Gravidez	24	Baguio	Asia and Oceania
Poland	Maja Klajda	22	Łęczna	Europe
Portugal	Maria Amélia Baptista	27	Porto	Europe
Puerto Rico	Valeria Pérez	23	Manatí	Americas and Caribbean
Romania	Alexandra Cătălin	23	Bucharest	Europe
Scotland	Amy Scott	24	Strathaven	Europe
Senegal	Mame Fama Gaye	24	Fatick	Africa
Serbia	Aleksandra Rutović	26	Belgrade	Europe
Sierra Leone	Lachaeveh Davies	23	Freetown	Africa
Singapore	Delvina Katerina Luther	28	Singapore	Asia and Oceania
Slovenia	Alida Tomanič	21	Ptuj	Europe
Somalia	Zainab Jama	23	Mogadishu	Africa
South Africa	Zoalize Jansen van Rensburg	19	Pretoria	Africa
South Sudan	Ayom Tito Mathiec	24	Gogrial	Africa
Spain	Corina Mrazek	22	Los Realejos	Europe
Sri Lanka	Anudi Gunasekara	25	Anuradhapura	Asia and Oceania
Suriname	Chenella Rozendaal	21	Paramaribo	Americas and Caribbean
Sweden	Isabelle Åhs	20	Malmö	Europe
Thailand	Suchata Chuangsri	21	Phuket	Asia and Oceania
Togo	Nathalie Yao-Amuama	24	Lomé	Africa
Trinidad and Tobago	Anna-Lise Nanton	23	Santa Cruz	Americas and Caribbean
Tunisia	Lamis Redissi	24	Djerba	Africa
Turkey	İdil Bilgen	24	Ankara	Asia and Oceania
Uganda	Natasha Nyonyozi	23	Kabale	Africa
Ukraine	Mariia Melnychenko	20	Kyiv	Europe
United States	Athenna Crosby	26	San Jose	Americas and Caribbean
Venezuela	Valeria Cannavò	24	Maracay	Americas and Caribbean
Vietnam	Ý Nhi Huỳnh	22	Bình Định	Asia and Oceania
Wales	Millie-Mae Adams	22	Cardiff	Europe
Zambia	Faith Bwalya	24	Kitwe	Africa
Zimbabwe	Courtney Jongwe	23	Mutare	Africa
