= Sudha Reddy =

Indian businesswoman and philanthropist

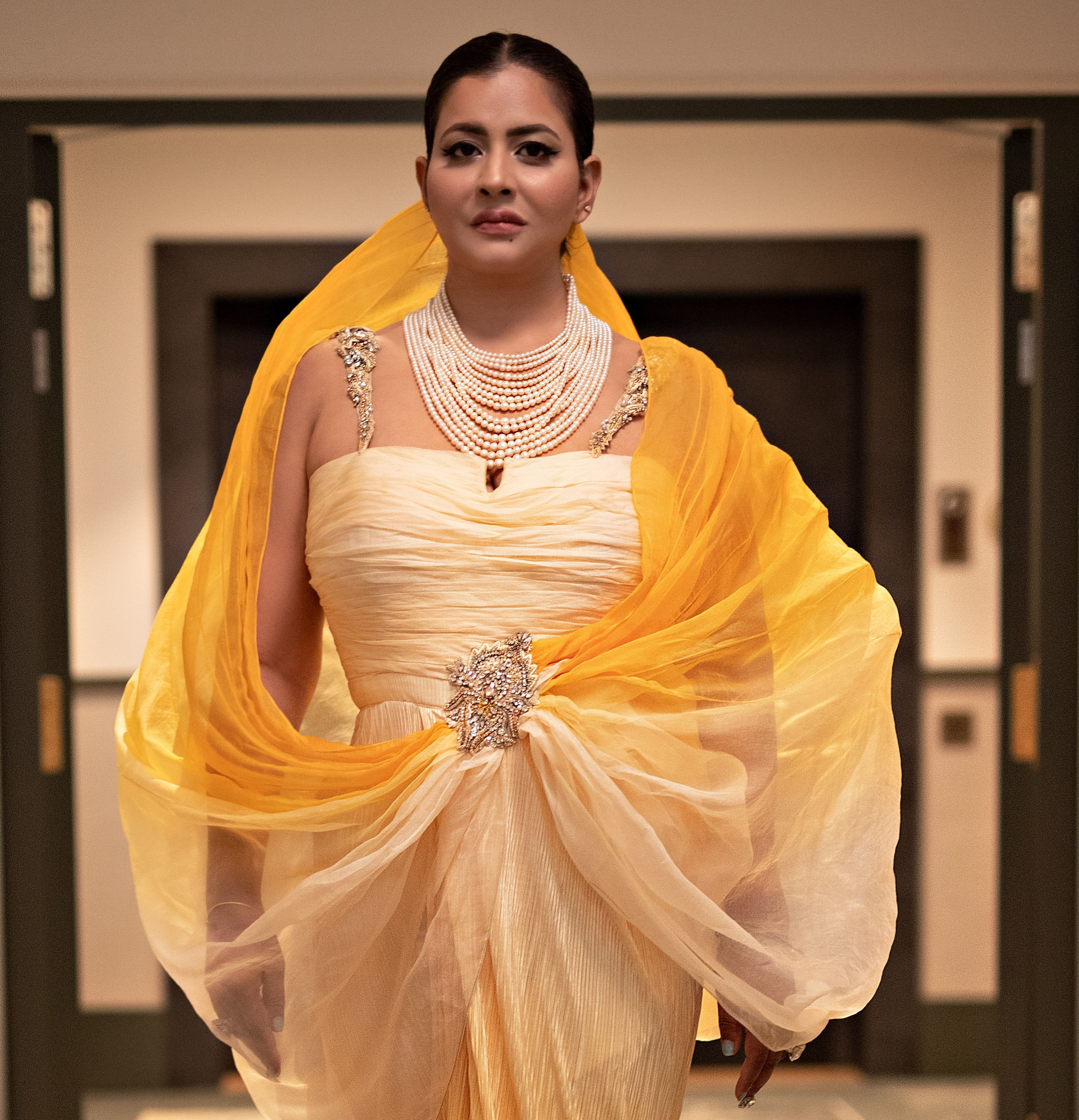
- Born: 10 December 1978 (age 47); Vuyyuru, Andhra Pradesh, India
- Education: Fashion design and microbiology
- Occupations: Businesswoman, fashion icon, and philanthropist
- Title: Director of Megha Engineering and Infrastructure Limited (MEIL) and chairperson, Sudha Reddy Foundation
- Spouse: Megha Krishna Reddy
- Children: 2

Sudha Reddy is an Indian businesswoman and philanthropist. She is the director of the MEIL Group (Megha Engineering & Infrastructures Limited), a business conglomerate headquartered in Hyderabad, India, founded in 1989 by her husband P.V. Krishna Reddy. Sudha is also the chairperson of the Sudha Reddy Foundation.

In 2025, during the 72nd edition of Miss World, Sudha was named the first Global Ambassador for “Beauty With a Purpose,” an initiative of the Miss World Organization led by its chairperson, Julia Evelyn Morley.

== Early life and education ==
Sudha Reddy, born on December 10, 1978, in Vuyyuru, Andhra Pradesh, grew up in a simple family with her parents, grandparents, and elder sister. Her father, K. B. Reddy, worked at the State Bank of India and her grandparents had an agricultural background.

Sudha completed her primary education in Vuyyuru itself, pursued a degree in microbiology, but later followed her passion for fashion by earning a degree at NIFT.

== Career ==
Reddy became a director at Megha Engineering & Infrastructures Limited (MEIL), where her work has included involvement in the company’s social outreach, community programmes, and hospitality ventures.

She established the Sudha Reddy Foundation, which supports initiatives in education, scholarships, and the empowerment of marginalised communities.

The foundation has worked with organisations including UNICEF on adolescent care programmes in India, and has collaborated with the Global Gift Foundation and Eva Longoria on projects for children affected by chronic illness, as well as with Elizabeth Hurley in support of the Breast Cancer Research Foundation.

Sudha is a board member at Andhra University for Mechanical Engineering, a public university in Visakhapatnam, Andhra Pradesh and serves as the chairperson at NRI General Hospital.

As the Global Ambassador for “Beauty With a Purpose,” an initiative of the Miss World Organization, Sudha is involved in supporting programs related to women’s empowerment, education, and community development.

== Philanthropy and partnerships ==
In 2024, Reddy established the Pink Power Run, an event organised through the Sudha Reddy Foundation to promote awareness of breast cancer and encourage public participation in fitness activities. The first edition, held in Hyderabad in September 2024, was reported to have drawn about 12,000 participants. A second edition took place on 28 September 2025, with an estimated 20,000 participants. Among the attendees were Miss World Organization chairperson Julia Morley.

In 2023, Reddy partnered with UNICEF India on a two-year initiative focused on adolescents aged 14 to 19, with programmes addressing child protection and employability in collaboration with government agencies and civil society She became a member of the UNICEF International Council, a network of private philanthropists and business leaders that work with UNICEF on global child welfare projects.

Sudha has worked with organizations such as Foundation, Action Against Hunger, Fight Hunger Global Peace Foundation, and the Mother Teresa Foundation. She received the 2022 Champions of Change Award from the to Telangana Government and contributed Action Contre La Faim, becoming a Global Gifter for the Global Gift Foundation in 2022.

== Public profile ==
She attended the Met Gala in 2021, 2024, and 2026, attended Paris Couture Week in 2022, and appeared at the Cannes Film Festival in 2023.

In 2023, Sudha also attended the Qatar Goodwood Festival in England, an elite horse racing and social event. In May 2025, Reddy hosted the Miss World 'Beauty With A Purpose” Gala at her residence in Hyderabad, attended by 108 delegates of Miss World 2025. Later that year, at the 72nd Miss World finale later that year, she was announced as the first Global Ambassador of the Miss World Organization by its chairperson Julia Evelyn Morley. In this capacity, she is associated with initiatives in women’s empowerment, education, and community development.

In September 2025, Reddy collaborated with the Miss World Organization to organize the Pink Power Run 2.0 in Hyderabad, an event held to raise awareness about breast cancer.

== Personal life ==
Sudha is married to businessman Megha Krishna Reddy and has two sons, Pranav and Manas. She lives in Jubilee Hills, Hyderabad.

== Awards and recognition ==
- 2021: Young Indian Women Achievers Under 45 Award
- 2022: Champions of Change Award by the Government of Telangana
- 2022: Fashion 4 Development Philanthropy Award, presented by New York State Senator Alessandra Biaggi, in recognition of her humanitarian work in India
- 2022: Global Gifter for the Global Gift Foundation
- 2023: Woman Pioneer of the Year Award by AsiaOne in Dubai for her philanthropic work
- 2023: Global Leader of The Year for her contributions in business and charitable activities
- 2025: Top 10 most influential businesswomen in India
