= Miss Universe Sri Lanka =

Beauty contest

Miss Sri Lanka Organization
- Formation: 1953
- Type: Beauty pageant
- Headquarters: Colombo
- Location: Sri Lanka
- Members: Miss Universe
- Official language: Sinhala; English

Miss Universe Sri Lanka (formerly known as Miss Ceylon) is a national pageant in Sri Lanka to choose ambassador for the Miss Universe pageant.

== History ==
=== Miss Ceylon ===
The first national beauty pageant in Sri Lanka, initially titled Miss Ceylon, began in 1953 with Manel Illangakoon of Colombo as its first titleholder, who subsequently represented the nation at the Miss World 1953 pageant, finishing as 3rd Runner-up. The contest is considered the oldest national pageant in Sri Lanka.

The national pageant winner was typically crowned to represent the country at Miss World, with runners-up historically delegated to pageants like Miss Universe, Miss International, and Miss Asia Pacific International. Sri Lanka has one international winner from Miss Asia Pacific International, Rosy Senanayake in 1981, she was crowned the official winner in Kuala Lumpur, Malaysia.

The first Miss Ceylon debuted at Miss Universe 1955 with Maureen Neliya Hingert where she placed 2nd Runner-Up.

=== Miss Sri Lanka ===
In 1973 Ceylon changed its name as Sri Lanka as permanent. In 1997 beauty pageant in Sri Lanka had separated and did not exist at Miss Universe until 2004 where Sri Lanka had no national franchise holder in that period. Shivanthini Dharmasiri is the last Miss Sri Lanka who represented the country at Miss Universe 1996.

==== Miss Sri Lanka Universe ====
In 2005 Sri Lanka Rozanne Dias competed at Miss Universe 2005 after eight years. Between 2005 and 2018 the pageant was under Mrs. Rosita Wickramasinghe, who served as the National Director for Miss Universe Sri Lanka. Beginning in 2024, Nirmal Bandara took over the Miss Universe license in Sri Lanka as the National Director.

===== National franchise holders =====
Miss Sri Lanka has become national franchise holder for Miss Universe and Miss International.

== Titleholders ==
Year	Miss Sri Lanka	District	Notes
1953	Manel Illangakoon	Colombo	Miss Ceylon Beauty Pageant – British Ceylon-Government
1954	Jeannette de Jonk	Colombo	
1955	Maureen Neliya Hingert	Colombo	
1957	Camellia Rosalia Perera	Colombo	
1960	Yvonne Eileen Gunawardene	Colombo	Miss Sri Lanka – Sound and Vision with Bandula Jayasekera Productions
1961	Kamala Athauda	Kalutara	
1962	Yvonne D'Rozario	Colombo	
1963	Manel de Silva	Colombo	
1964	Dona Annette Felicia Kulatunga	Colombo	
1965	Shirlene Minerva de Silva	Colombo	
1966	Lorraine Roosmalecocq	Colombo	
1967	Seedevi de Zoysas Tewaitta Ragama	Colombo	
1968	Sheila Jayatilleke	Colombo	
1969	Marlene Beverly Seneveratne	Colombo	
1970	Yolanda Shahzadi Ahlip	Colombo	
1971	Gail Abayasinghe	Colombo	
1972	Damayanthi Gunewardena	Colombo	
1973	Shiranthi Wickremesinghe	Badulla	The wife of the sixth President of Sri Lanka, Mahinda Rajapaksa
1974	Melani Irene Wijendra	Colombo	
1975	Shyama Hiramya Algama	Colombo	
1976	Genevieve Bernedette Parsons	Colombo	
1977	Sobodhini Nagesan	Colombo	
1978	Dilrukshi Wimalasoonya	Colombo	
1979	Vidyahari Vanigasooriyar	Colombo	
1980	Bernadine Rosi Ramanayake	Colombo	
1981	Renuka Varuni Jesudhason	Matale	
1982	Ann Monica Tradigo	Colombo	
1983	Shyama Ayesa Cecilia Fernando	Colombo	
1984	Nilmini Iddamalgoda	Colombo	
1985	Ramani Liz Bartholomeusz	Colombo	
1986	Indra Kumari	Colombo	
1987	Nandaine Wijiegooneratna	Colombo	
1988	Deepthi Alles	Colombo	
1989	Veronica Ruston	Colombo	
1990	Roshani Aluwihare	Colombo	
1991	Diloka Seneviratne	Colombo	
1992	Hiranthi Devapriya	Colombo	
1993	Chamila Wickramesinghe	Colombo	
1994	Nushara Fernando	Colombo	
1995	Shivani Vasagam	Colombo	
1996	Shivanthini Dharmasiri	Colombo	
2005	Rozanne Diasz	Gampaha	Miss Universe Sri Lanka – Rosita Wickramasinghe (Essential Entertainment) directorship
2006	Jacqueline Fernandez	Colombo	Bollywood Actress
2007	Aruni Madusha Rajapakse	Kandy	
2008	Faith Landers	Badulla	
2010	Ishanka Madurasinghe	Kegalle	
2011	Stephanie Siriwardhana	Colombo	Sri Lanka-Lebanese descent
2012	Sabrina Herft	Colombo	
2013	Amanda Ratnayake	Colombo	
2014	Avanti Marianne	Colombo	
2016	Jayathi De Silva	Colombo	
2017	Christina Peiris	Colombo	
2018	Ornella Gunesekere	Colombo	
2024	Melloney Dassanayake	Colombo	
2025	Lihasha White	Colombo	
2026	Nimhara Sasindi	Colombo	

== Titleholders under Miss Sri Lanka org. ==
=== Miss Universe Sri Lanka ===
- : Declared as Winner
- : Ended as runner-up or top 5/6 qualification
- : Ended as one of the finalists or semifinalists
- : Ended as special awards winner

Year	Miss Sri Lanka	Placement at Miss Universe	Special Award(s)	Notes
Nirmal Bandara directorship — a franchise holder to Miss Universe from 2024
2026	Nimhara Sasindi	TBA		
2025	Lihasha White	Unplaced		
2024	Melloney Dassanayake	Unplaced		
Rosita Wickramasinghe directorship — a franchise holder to Miss Universe between 2005 and 2018
Did not compete between 2019 and 2023
2018	Ornella Mariam Jayshree Gunesekere	Unplaced	Miss Congeniality	Ornella was 3rd Runner-up at Miss Supranational 2016, Top 10 and Miss Popular Vote at Miss Grand International 2015 and Top 15 and Miss Friendship at Miss Tourism International 2011.
2017	Christina Peiris	Top 16		Crowned in special event after the annual Miss Sri Lanka did not recruit candidates to make a batch.
2016	Jayathi De Silva	Unplaced		
Did not compete in 2015
2014	Avanti Marianne	Unplaced		
2013	Amanda Ratnayake	Unplaced		
2012	Sabrina Herft	Unplaced	Best National Costume (3rd Runner-up)	
2011	Stephanie Siriwardhana	Unplaced		Sri Lanka-Lebanese descent
2010	Ishanka Madurasinghe	Unplaced		
2009	Faith Landers	Did not compete		
2008	Aruni Madusha Rajapakse	Unplaced		Aruni won in 2007 and allocated to Miss International 2007 before coming to Miss Universe 2008.
Did not compete in 2007
2006	Jacqueline Fernandez	Unplaced	Best National Costume (Top 20)	
2005	Rozanne Diasz	Unplaced		
Sound and Vision with Bandula Jayasekera Productions — a franchise holder to Miss Universe between 1958 and 1996
Did not compete between 1997 and 2004
1996	Shivanthini Dharmasiri	Unplaced		
1995	Shivani Vasagam	Unplaced		
1994	Nushara Fernando	Unplaced		
1993	Chamila Wickramesinghe	Unplaced		
1992	Hiranthi Devapriya	Unplaced		
1991	Diloka Seneviratne	Unplaced		
1990	Roshani Aluwihare	Unplaced		
1989	Veronica Ruston	Unplaced		
1988	Deepthi Alles	Unplaced		
1987	Nandaine Wijiegooneratna	Unplaced		
1986	Indra Kumari	Unplaced		
1985	Ramani Liz Bartholomeusz	Unplaced		
Did not compete in 1984
1983	Shyama Ayesa Cecilia Fernando	Unplaced		
1982	Ann Monica Tradigo	Unplaced		
1981	Renuka Varuni Jesudhason	Unplaced		
1980	Hyacinth Kurukulasuriya	Unplaced		
1979	Vidyahari Vanigasooriyar	Unplaced		
1978	Dilrukshi Wimalasoonya	Unplaced		
1977	Sobodhini Nagesan	Unplaced		
1976	Genevieve Bernedette Parsons	Unplaced		
1975	Shyama Hiramya Algama	Unplaced		
1974	Melani Irene Wijendra	Unplaced		
1973	Shiranthi Wickremesinghe	Unplaced		
Did not compete in 1972
1971	Gail Abayasinghe	Unplaced		
1970	Yolanda Shahzadi Ahlip	Unplaced		
1969	Marlene Beverly Seneveratne	Unplaced		
1968	Sheila Jayatilleke	Unplaced		
Did not compete in 1967
1966	Lorraine Roosmalecocq	Unplaced		
1965	Shirlene Minerva de Silva	Unplaced		
1964	Dona Annette Felicia Kulatunga	Unplaced		
1963	Manel de Silva	Unplaced		
1962	Yvonne D'Rozario	Unplaced		
1961	Ranjini Nilani Jayatilleke	Unplaced		
British Ceylon-Government directorship — a franchise holder to Miss Universe between 1955 and 1957
Did not compete between 1958 and 1960
1957	Camellia Rosalia Perera	Unplaced		
Did not compete in 1956
1955	Maureen Neliya Hingert	2nd Runner-up		

=== Miss International Sri Lanka ===
- : Declared as Winner
- : Ended as runner-up or top 5/6 qualification
- : Ended as one of the finalists or semifinalists
- : Ended as special awards winner

Year	Miss Sri Lanka International	Placement at Miss International	Special Award(s)	Notes
2026	Tiffany Wijepala	TBA		
2025	Sheneli Romaya	Top 10		
2024	Maya Dmitri	Unplaced		
2023	Umanda Bamunuachchi	Unplaced		
Did not compete between 2020 and 2022
2019	Pawani Vithanage	Top 15		
2018	Natalee Fernando	Unplaced		In 2018 Miss Sri Lanka Intercontinental under Joyce James Gunawardene directorship took over the right of Miss International license too. The 2017 titleholder appointed to compete at Miss International 2018 in Japan.
Did not compete in 2017
2016	Ayesha Fernando	Unplaced		
2015	Angela Richard Jayatissa	Unplaced		
2014	Tamara Shanelle Makalanda	Unplaced		
Did not compete in 2013
2012	Madusha Rushani Mayadunne	2nd Runner-up		
Did not compete in 2011
2010	Ornella Mariam Jayasiri Gunesekere	Unplaced		
Did not compete in 2009
2008	Faith Landers	Unplaced		
2007	Aruni Madusha Rajapakse	Top 15		
Did not compete in 2006
2005	Gayesha Perera Wickramarachchige	Unplaced		

== Notes ==
- Miss Sri Lanka 1973: Shiranthi Rajapaksa is the wife of the sixth President of Sri Lanka, Mahinda Rajapaksa
- Miss Sri Lanka 1985: Bartholomeusz died on 30 June 1987 at the age of 20 when she allegedly jumped out of the car while Kamal Addararachchi was driving it after a dispute. Exact details are unknown.
- Miss Sri Lanka 2008: Faith Landers did not compete at the Miss Universe 2009 due to lack sponsorship. She only competed at Miss International 2008 in Macau.

== See also ==
- Miss World Sri Lanka
- Miss Earth Sri Lanka
- Miss Sri Lanka Online
