= Ran Banda Seneviratne =

- Ran Banda Seneviratne
- Occupations: Writer, attorney-at-law, media personality

Ran Banda Seneviratne (Sinhala: රන් බණ්ඩා සෙනෙවිරත්න; died 5 December 2001) was a Sri Lankan lawyer, author, lyricist, television and radio presenter.

== Early life ==
Ran Banda was born in the remote village of Maradankalla near Mihintale, in the Anuradhapura District. His father was a teacher and an ayurvedic healer known as Wannihamy. The idiomatic usage of language evident in his mature writing and speeches stand witness to the fact that he never lost touch with his village heritage. He sometimes called himself a Bayya (Hillbilly) from Mihintale and did so with a great sense of pride.

== Mature Years ==
After qualifying as an attorney-at-law he practiced in Hultsdorf, Colombo. He was an active member of the Bar Association of Sri Lanka, notably representing Sepala Ekanayake, a Sri Lankan who gained international notoriety after hijacking an Alitalia Boeing 747 with 340 passengers on June 30, 1982.

He embarked on a career in broadcast presentation and was popular for his wit and choice of language as a television and radio personality. However in the 1990s, after likening a President's Counsel newly appointed by Chandrika Bandaranaike Kumaratunga to a donkey while he was on a State television program, he was prohibited from further participation at talk shows.

Mr. Seneviratne also gained fame as a lyricist and author both in Sinhalese and English, composing many memorable songs sung by the likes of Gunadasa Kapuge and Amarasiri Peiris. Many of his lyrics deal with social issues and strike a deeply personal note, drawing from his own cultural roots.

Ran Banda Seneviratne died in 2002 and his last rites were performed at Anuradhapura in accordance with his wishes.

== Works ==
=== Lyrics ===
- Davasak Pala Nathi Hene (sung by Gunadasa Kapuge - links to the song as well as interpretation available below)
- Ula Leno (sung by Gunadasa Kapuge)
- Sumano (sung by Gunadasa Kapuge)
- Landune (sung by Amarasiri Peiris)
- Pabalu nage (sung by Gunadasa Kapuge)

=== Poetry ===
- Hithae Dukata Kiyana Kavi
- Nihanda Nimnaya

=== Non-Fiction ===
- A New Political Concept for Sri Lanka (1999) ISBN 955-96871-1-5

== Quotes ==
There was a time when a dog lying dead on the road would attract a crowd of around fifty people; Today if fifty people lay dead on the road, not a dog would come by to take a look".

"An ancient king who could not verify the truth of a story narrated by the plaintiff or the defendant, took refuge in bringing the royal donkey to Court and said if the judgment was to be given in favour of the plaintiff, the donkey would shake its head and if the judgment was in favour of the defendant the donkey would wag its tail and the whole country was astounded by the correctness of the judgment given by the King and he appointed the donkey as the King’s Counsel. Thus the first President’s Counsel was a donkey" (commenting on an unpopular move by the then President of Sri Lanka to appoint her own Secretary as a President’s Counsel. This comment, made on the State Television Station Rupavahini cause him to be removed forthwith as a presenter of an extremely popular children’s show televised by that channel.)
