= Stephanie Siriwardhana =

Sri Lankan model and beauty pageant contestant

- Born: 5 February 1988 (age 38); Kuwait
- Height: 5 ft 7 in (1.70 m)
- Spouse: Dushyanth Weeramann
- Awards: Miss Universe Sri Lanka 2011, Miss Asia Pacific World Sri Lanka (2013)

Stephanie Siriwardhana (Sinhala: ස්ටෙෆනි සිරිවර්ධන; born 5 February 1988) is a Sri Lankan-Lebanese TV host, model and beauty pageant titleholder who as the winner of 2011 Miss Universe Sri Lanka represented her country at the 2011 Miss Universe pageant. She is also the main host of The Voice Teens Sri Lanka season 1 and 2.

== Biography ==
She was born on 5 February 1988 in Kuwait to a Sri Lankan father and a Lebanese mother. She is the eldest of 4 children, and has 3 younger brothers. When she was 3 years old her family moved to Sri Lanka due to the escalation of Gulf War. After finishing her primary education in Sri Lanka she moved to Italy and then to Canada where she graduated with a degree in Journalism, Communications and Political Science from Concordia University in Montreal.

In July 2011 she won the title of Miss Universe in Sri Lanka and represented her country at Miss Universe pageant which was held in Brazil on same year. In 2013, she was crowned as Miss Asia Pacific World Sri Lanka.

She is a member of Global Shapers Community, and has worked as a senator of the 2nd Sri Lankan Youth Parliament. Also she is the founder of Stephanie Siriwardhana Foundation, which intends to support a transitional shelter for sexually abused young girls.

== Filmography ==
In 2013 she appeared in a song of Kannada film Dirty Picture: Silk Sakkath Maga.

Awards and achievements
Preceded by Ishanka Madurasinghe	Miss Universe Sri Lanka; 2011	Succeeded by Sabrina Herft
