= Dannielle Kerkoven =

Sri Lankan model

- Born: 6 October 1987 (age 37); Colombo, Sri Lanka
- Occupation: Model

Rapthi Raffella Dannielle Kerkoven (born 6 October 1987) is a Sri Lankan model and beauty pageant titleholder.

== Biography ==
Kerkoven was born in Colombo, Sri Lanka. She has completed her education with a diploma in airline ticketing and reservations, and works as a model. Kerkoven is the niece of Sri Lankan designer Kirthi Sri Karunaratna and the daughter of former model Rehana Kerkoven. Brian Kerkoven, the renowned designer, is her paternal uncle.

Kerkoven began modelling when she was 12 years old. She was nominated by a local travel agency to represent Sri Lanka in Miss World 2006, following cancellation of the 2006 Miss World Sri Lanka pageant due to security reasons. In 2012, Kerkoven entered the International Best Female Model World pageant, held in Spain, and placed second runner-up. In 2014, she won the title of Asia's Top Fashion Model of the Year (Female Category) at the Fashion Asia Awards.

In 2017, Kerkoven was appointed a World Peace Ambassador by the World Peace and Diplomacy Organisation India.
