= Miss World Sri Lanka =

Beauty pageant

- Formation: 1953
- Type: Beauty pageant
- Headquarters: Colombo
- Location: Sri Lanka
- Members: Miss World
- Official language: Sinhala; English

Miss World Sri Lanka is a beauty contest held in Sri Lanka to select the country's representative to the Miss World.

== History ==
=== Miss Ceylon ===
The first national beauty pageant in Sri Lanka, initially titled Miss Ceylon, began in 1953 with Manel Illangakoon of Colombo as its first titleholder, who subsequently represented the nation at the Miss World 1953 pageant, finishing as 3rd Runner-up. The contest is considered the oldest national pageant in Sri Lanka.

The national pageant winner was typically crowned to represent the country at Miss World, with runners-up historically delegated to pageants like Miss Universe, Miss International, and Miss Asia Pacific International. Sri Lanka has one international winner from Miss Asia Pacific International, Bernadine Rosemarie Fernando Ramanyake in 1981, she was crowned the official winner in Kuala Lumpur, Malaysia.

=== Miss Sri Lanka ===
Ceylon was officially renamed Sri Lanka in 1972, and the national title was concurrently changed to Miss Sri Lanka.

==== Miss World Sri Lanka ====
Following the Miss Sri Lanka pageant in 1995, which was the last year of the original combined national competition, the process for selecting representatives changed. From 1997 onward, the national beauty pageants generally began to exist as separate, independent events to secure specific international franchises. Notably, Sri Lanka was not represented at the Miss Universe pageant for an eight-year period, from 1997 to 2004, due to the absence of a national franchise holder. The country resumed sending a delegate to Miss Universe in 2005.Sri Lanka did, however, continue to send delegates to the Miss World pageant during most of these years, with a new separate organization being responsible for that title.

From 2003, the new national pageant was established as the Miss World Sri Lanka pageant, with the winner representing the country at the Miss World competition. While this new, separate pageant format began in 2003, TV Derana was generally noted to have taken over the official hosting and organizing of the event from 2007 onwards. The current license holder is Siyatha TV

== Titleholders ==
Color key

- Declared as Winner
- Ended as runner-up
- Ended as one of the finalists or semifinalists
- Ended as special awards winner

| Year | Miss World Sri Lanka | Placement | Notable Achievements |
|---|---|---|---|
| 2027 | Shwetha Liyanaduwa | TBA | |
| 2026 | Prathibha Liyaanarachchi | Unplaced | Top 24 Miss World Talent; Top 24 Miss World Sports; Top 24 Miss World Beauty With A Purpose; Top 60 Miss World Top Model |
| 2025 | Anudi Gunasekara | Unplaced | Top 24 Miss World Talent; Top 20 Miss World Head to Head; Runners up Asia Miss World Multimedia Challenge |
| 2023 | Kavindi Nethmini | Unplaced | |
| 2022 | Miss World 2021 was rescheduled to 16 March 2022 due to the COVID-19 pandemic outbreak in Puerto Rico, no edition started in 2022 | | |
| 2021 | Sadé Greenwood | Top 40 | Top 10 Beauty with a Purpose |
| 2020 | Due to the impact of COVID-19 pandemic, no pageant in 2020 | | |
| 2019 | Dewmini Thathsarani | Unplaced | |
| 2018 | Nadia Gyi | Unplaced | Top 32 Miss World Top Model |
| 2017 | Dusheni Silva | Unplaced | |
| 2016 | Amritaa De Silva | Unplaced | Top 24 Beauty with a Purpose |
| 2015 | Thilini Amarasooriya | Unplaced | |
| 2014 | Chulakshi Ranathunga | Unplaced | Top 50 People's Choice Award |
| 2013 | Iresha Asanki de Silva | Unplaced | Top 40 Beach Fashion |
| 2012 | Sumudu Prasadini | Unplaced | Top 46 Top Model |
| 2011 | Pushpika Sandamali | Unplaced | Top 30 Beauty with a Purpose |
| 2010 | Fallon Ranasinghe | Unplaced | Top 40 Beach Beauty |
| 2009 | Gamya Wijayadasa | Unplaced | |
| 2008 | Rochelle Correa | Unplaced | |
| 2007 | Maria Colombage | Unplaced | |
| 2006 | Dannielle Kerkoven | Unplaced | |
| 2005 | Nadeeka Perera | Unplaced | |
| 2004 | Anarkalli Jay Aakarsha | Unplaced | |
| 2003 | Sachini Stanley | Unplaced | |
| 2002 | Nilusha Gamage | Did not compete | Sri Lanka Boycotted due to the Miss World riots |
| 2000 | Ganga Gunasekera | Unplaced | |
| 1999 | Dilumini de Alwis Jayasinghe | Unplaced | |
| 1994 | Nushara Rusri Pramali Fernando | Unplaced | Competed in Miss Universe 1994 |
| 1993 | Chamila Wickremesinghe | Unplaced | |
| 1992 | Ishara Abelashini Makolange | Unplaced | |
| 1991 | Jackie Emelda Bennett | Unplaced | |
| 1990 | Angela Mary Jane Gunasekera | Unplaced | |
| 1989 | Serena Danvers | Unplaced | |
| 1988 | Michelle Koelmeyer | Unplaced | |
| 1987 | Priyanjali Marina Frances de Alwis | Unplaced | |
| 1986 | Indira Gunaratne | Unplaced | |
| 1985 | Natalie Gunewardene | Unplaced | |
| 1984 | Bhagya Udeshinka Gunasinghe | Unplaced | |
| 1983 | Fiona Wickremesinghe | Did not compete | Due to personal reasons |
| 1982 | Tania Colleen Anne Pereira | Unplaced | |
| 1981 | Sonya Elizabeth Tucker | Unplaced | |
| 1980 | Bernadine Ramanyake | Unplaced | Miss Asia Pacific 1981, Mrs. World 1985 |
| 1979 | Shamila Weerasooriya | Unplaced | |
| 1978 | Manohari Vanigasooriya | Top 15 | |
| 1977 | Sharmini Senaratna | Unplaced | |
| 1976 | Tamara Ingrid Subramanian | Did not compete | Protest against South Africa's race policies |
| 1975 | Angela Seneviratne | Unplaced | |
| 1974 | Vinodini Roshanara Jayskera | Unplaced | |
| 1973 | Shiranthi Wickremesinghe | Unplaced | Competed in Miss Universe 1973 |
| 1971 | Gail Abayasinghe | Unplaced | |
| 1970 | Yolanda Shahzadi Ahlip | Top 15 | |
| 1968 | Nilanthie Wijesinghe | Unplaced | |
| 1967 | Therese Fernando | Unplaced | |
| 1966 | Priscilla Martensyn | Unplaced | |
| 1965 | Shirlene Minerva de Silva | Unplaced | Competed in Miss Universe 1965 |
| 1964 | Marina Dellerene Swan | Unplaced | |
| 1963 | Jennifer Anne Fonseka | Top 15 | |
| 1961 | Sushila Perera | Unplaced | |
| 1955 | Viola Sita Gunarate | Unplaced | |
| 1954 | Jeannette de Jonk | Unplaced | |
| 1953 | Manel Illangakoon | 3rd runner-up | |

== See also ==
- Miss Earth Sri Lanka
- Miss Universe Sri Lanka
- Miss Sri Lanka Online
- Miss Grand Sri Lanka
