= Miss Nepal 2022 =

Beauty pageant in Nepal

- Date: 18 June 2022
- Presenters: Shrijal Rupakheti; Evana Manandhar; Malina Joshi; Meera Kakshapati; Riya Basnet; Rojina Shrestha; Ronali Amatya
- Venue: Godavari Sunrise Convention Center, Lalitpur, Nepal
- Broadcaster: Kantipur Television
- Entrants: 24
- Placements: 12
- Winner: Priyanka Rani Joshi; Kathmandu

Hidden Treasures Dabur Vatika Shampoo Miss Nepal 2022, the 26th Miss Nepal beauty pageant, was held on 18 June 2022 in Lalitpur, Nepal. During the coronation night, three winners were crowned by Miss World Nepal 2020 Namrata Shrestha, Miss Earth Nepal 2020 Supriya Shrestha and Miss International Nepal 2020 Sandhya Sharma.

In addition, the winners received Rs 250,000 as prize money for winning the title. The auditions of Miss Nepal will be held from 22 April to 10 May in 7 Provinces of Nepal including Birgunj, Dhangadhi, Dharan, Nepalgunj, Pokhara, Surkhet and Kathmandu.

Kantipur Television broadcast the pageant live for the Nepalese at home and abroad.

The Top 3 winners of 2022 crowned their successors: Miss Nepal World 2020 Namrata Shrestha crowned Priyanka Rani Joshi as Miss Nepal World 2022, Miss Nepal Earth 2020 Supriya Shrestha crowned Sareesha Shrestha as Miss Nepal Earth 2022 and Miss Nepal International 2020 Sandhya Sharma crowned Nancy Khadka as Miss Nepal International 2022.

== Results ==
=== Placements ===
Color keys

- The contestant was a Semi-Finalist in an International pageant.
- The contestant did not place but won a Special Award in the pageant.
- The contestant did not place.

Placement	Contestant	International placement
Miss Nepal 2022	Kathmandu – Priyanka Rani Joshi	Top 40– Miss World 2023 Top 25- Head to Head Top 32- Sports Challenge Asia & Oceania Winner- Beauty with a Purpose
1st Runner-Up (Miss Earth Nepal 2022)	Lalitpur – Sareesha Shrestha	Unplaced – Miss Earth 2022; Best Eco-Video (Asia & Oceania)
2nd Runner-Up (Miss International Nepal 2022)	Biratnagar – Nancy Khadka (●)	Unplaced – Miss International 2022
Top 6	Bhaktapur – Susmita Bogati; Kathmandu – Rose Kandel; Kathmandu – Smarika Sharma	
Top 12	Bandipur – Sriyansu Piya; Dharan – Merika Baskota; Kathmandu – Anoushka Poudel; Kathmandu – Sophia Shrestha; Kathmandu – Sriya Gajurel; Lalitpur – Yashaswi Shrestha	

(●): The candidate is the winner of Miss Popular Choice (online voting) and got direct entry into Top 12 semi-Finalists.

=== Judges ===
- Ms Anushka Shrestha - Winner of Miss Nepal 2019 and Top 12 Finalist in Miss World 2019
- Mr Bhushan Chand - Former Lieutenant General
- Ms Niti Shah - Miss International Nepal 2017
- Dr. Balram Pathak - Chairman of Rastriya Banijya Bank
- Mrs Poonam Ghimire - Winner of Miss Nepal 1996
- Mr Kishor Maharjan - Chairman of Star Hospital Limited
- Ms Lakpa Wangmo Tamang - Miss Tamang 2013 and Miss Talent Winner in Miss Nepal 2014
- Mr Deepak Thapa - Nepal's Sports Personality 2017 and Secretary General of Kathmandu Badminton Academy
- Mrs Ayasha Shrestha - Three-time Gold Medallist for Taekwondo at the South Asian Games
- Mr Nischal Basnet - Nepali film director
- Ms Lemi Tamang - Make-up Artist

=== Contestants ===
#	Contestants	Age	Height	Home Town	Education
1	Anoushka Poudel	25	5 ft 6 in (1.68 m)	Kathmandu, Bagmati Province	English literature
2	Sriyansu Piya	23	5 ft 6.5 in (1.69 m)	Bandipur, Gandaki Province	Public health
3	Dr. Dilasha Dotel	25	5 ft 4 in (1.63 m)	Butwal, Lumbini Province	MBBS
4	Ashra Shrestha	23	5 ft 8 in (1.73 m)	Kathmandu, Bagmati Province	Management
5	Aayushnova Dhungana	23	5 ft 5 in (1.65 m)	Kathmandu, Bagmati Province	Medical
6	Aakriti Shah	19	5 ft 6 in (1.68 m)	Sunsari, Province No. 1	Nursing
7	Merika Baskota	20	5 ft 5 in (1.65 m)	Dharan, Province No. 1	Dentistry
8	Manashi Chand	TBA	5 ft 6 in (1.68 m)	Nepalgunj, Lumbini Province	Agriculture
9	Smarika Sharma	25	5 ft 5 in (1.65 m)	Kathmandu, Bagmati Province	BBA
10	Sriya Gajurel	26	5 ft 6 in (1.68 m)	Kathmandu, Bagmati Province	Health science and biology
11	Susmita Bogati	TBA	5 ft 4 in (1.63 m)	Bhaktapur, Bagmati Province	BSC nursing
12	Mamata Dhakal	TBA	5 ft 4 in (1.63 m)	Gorkha, Gandaki Province	Health science
13	Aishwarya Shahi Thakuri	24	5 ft 7.5 in (1.71 m)	Sindhuli, Bagmati Province	Biomedical engineering
14	Sareesha Shrestha	25	5 ft 4.5 in (1.64 m)	Lalitpur, Bagmati Province	MBBS
15	Anusurya Dangee	TBA	5 ft 7.5 in (1.71 m)	Sankhuwasabha, Province No. 1	
16	Hritual Paudel	TBA	5 ft 4 in (1.63 m)	Chitwan, Bagmati Province	Applied science
17	Priyanka Rani Joshi	TBA	5 ft 5 in (1.65 m)	Kathmandu, Bagmati Province	
18	Yashaswi Shrestha	TBA	5 ft 7.5 in (1.71 m)	Lalitpur, Bagmati Province	MBBS
19	Rose Kandel	22	5 ft 5.5 in (1.66 m)	Kathmandu, Bagmati Province	Economics
20	Nancy Khadka	24	5 ft 7 in (1.70 m)	Biratnagar, Province No. 1	Communication and Psychology
21	Sophia Shrestha	23	5 ft 7 in (1.70 m)	Kathmandu, Bagmati Province	Business administration
22	Aasruti Subedi	19	5 ft 5.6 in (1.67 m)	Kathmandu, Bagmati Province	Tourism management
23	Ganga Gurung	26	5 ft 7.8 in (1.72 m)	Tanahun, Gandaki Province	Occupational therapy
24	Ashmita Dhungana	TBA	5 ft 4 in (1.63 m)	Dhulikhel, Bagmati Province	TBA

== Previous pageants ==
- Ashra Shrestha competed in Miss Asia Pacific International Nepal 2019.
- Sriya Gajurel was the winner of Miss Nepal North America 2019.
- Sareesha Shrestha was winner of Nepal's Fashion Icon 2017, Miss Rotaract 2019 and Miss Newa 2018.
- Susmita Bogati was the 1st Runner-Up of Miss Nepal Peace 2074.
- Nancy Khadka was the 4th Runner-Up of Miss Universe Nepal 2020.
- Ashmita Dhungana was the winner of Miss Landscapes Nepal 2019.
- Ashmita Dhungana competed in Miss Grand Nepal 2019.
