= Miss Brazil CNB 2024 =

33rd Miss Brazil CNB pageant

- Date: September 3, 2024
- Presenters: Juliano Crema; Gabi Torbes
- Entertainment: DJ Gabriel Souza
- Venue: Machadinho Thermas Resort, Machadinho, RS, Brazil
- Broadcaster: Livestream (YouTube)
- Entrants: 31

Miss Brazil CNB 2024 was the 33rd edition of the Miss Brazil World pageant and the 8th edition under Miss Brazil CNB, was held on September 3, 2024, at the Machadinho Thermas Resort in Machadinho, Rio Grande do Sul, Brazil. Each state, the Federal District and various Insular Regions & Cities competed for the title. Leticía Frota of Amazonas crowned her successor, Jéssica Pedrosa of Centro Sul Paulistano, at the end of the contest, who will represent Brazil at Miss World 2025.

== Results ==
Color keys

- The contestant won in an International pageant.
- The contestant was a Finalist/Runner-up in an International pageant.
- The contestant was a Semi-Finalist in an International pageant.
- The contestant did not place.

=== Placements ===
Placement	Contestants (Final Points)	International Placement
Miss Brazil CNB 2024	(São Paulo (state)) Centro Sul Paulistano - Jéssica Pedroso (142)	Top 08 and Queen of Americas at Miss World 2025.
1st runner-up	Mato Grosso - Cristiane Stipp (120) (Note: The representative from Mato Grosso received 4 votes to be the first runner-up.)	Winner of Reinado Internacional del Café 2025.
2nd runner-up	(Maranhão) Ilhas de São Luís - Natália Seipel Nikolić (120) (Note: The representative from Ilhas de São Luís received 2 votes to be the first runner-up.)	
3rd runner-up	Rio Grande do Sul - Joanna Camargo (117)	
4th runner-up	(Paraná (state)) Paraná - Giovanna Casagrande (114)	
Top 10 (In order of final results)	(São Paulo (state)) São Paulo - Therezinha Marques (97); Sergipe - Vitória Andrade (97); (Santa Catarina (state)) Costa Verde e Mar - Sarah Lemonie (96); Pernambuco - Rayane Matos (96); Espírito Santo - Nicole Guedes (94)	
Top 18 (In order of final results)	Bahia - Nicolly Borges (81); Pará - Raquel Albuquerque (81); (Rio de Janeiro (state)) Rio de Janeiro - Juliana Panaro (81); Maranhão - Mabyan Bezerra (77); Mato Grosso do Sul - Danielle Cristinne (74); Goiás - Beatriz Custódio (72); Rio Grande do Norte - Duda Santos (71); Brasília - Maria Tereza Oliveira (68)	

=== Announcements order ===
==== Top 18 ====
1. Centro Sul Paulistano
2. Bahia
3. Mato Grosso do Sul
4. Pará
5. Mato Grosso
6. Rio Grande do Sul
7. Brasília
8. São Paulo
9. Maranhão
10. Rio de Janeiro
11. Paraná
12. Sergipe
13. Pernambuco
14. Ilhas de São Luís
15. Goiás
16. Espírito Santo
17. Costa Verde e Mar
18. Rio Grande do Norte

==== Top 10 ====
1. Centro Sul Paulistano
2. Rio Grande do Sul
3. São Paulo
4. Ilhas de São Luís
5. Sergipe
6. Pernambuco
7. Paraná
8. Espírito Santo
9. Costa Verde e Mar
10. Mato Grosso

==== Top 05 ====
1. Ilhas de São Luís
2. Paraná
3. Rio Grande do Sul
4. Centro Sul Paulistano
5. Mato Grosso

== Special Prizes ==
=== Regional Queens of Beauty ===
Award	Winner
Miss Midwest	Mato Grosso - Cristiane Stipp
Miss North	Pará - Raquel Albuquerque
Miss Northeast	(Maranhão) Ilhas de São Luís - Natália Seipel Nikolić
Miss South	Rio Grande do Sul - Joanna Camargo
Miss Southeast	(São Paulo (state)) São Paulo - Therezinha Marques

=== Special awards ===
Award		Winner
Sponsors Awards	Miss Congeniality	Sergipe - Vitória Andrade
Sponsors Awards	Miss Photogenic	(São Paulo (state)) Ipiranga - Isabelle Crystine
Sponsors Awards	Miss Elegance	(São Paulo (state)) Centro Sul Paulistano - Jéssica Pedroso
Sponsors Awards	Miss Cordiality	Brasília - Maria Tereza Oliveira
Sponsors Awards	Miss Personality	Brasília - Maria Tereza Oliveira
Fast Track Events	Miss Popular Vote	Brasília - Maria Tereza Oliveira
Fast Track Events	Best in Talent	Mato Grosso do Sul - Danielle Oliveira
Fast Track Events	Best in Interview	(São Paulo (state)) Centro Sul Paulistano - Jéssica Pedroso
Fast Track Events	Best in Top Model	(Santa Catarina (state)) Costa Verde e Mar - Sarah Lemonie
Fast Track Events	Best in Social Media	(São Paulo (state)) Centro Sul Paulistano - Jéssica Pedroso
Fast Track Events	Best in National Costume	Bahia - Nicolly Borges
Fast Track Events	Best in Beauty with a Purpose	Mato Grosso - Cristiane Stipp

=== Special Awards for Coordinators ===
Award	Winner
Best Regional Coordinator	Sergipe - Edgar Mecena
Best Regional Contest	Ceará - Samuel Oliveira

== Judges ==
=== Final ===
1. Letícia Frota, Miss Brasil CNB 2022.
2. Alex Petrow, marketing director of "dōTERRA";
3. Eduardo Menezes, Mister Brazil for Mister World 2024.
4. João Ricardo Camilo Dias, from "Miss Brazil on Board" forums;
5. Pedro Luiz Sobreira Júnior, CEO "Luisa Sobreira" shoes;
6. Marina Fontes, CEO Miss Brasil World;

== Delegates ==
Exact 31 delegates competed for this year's title:

Representation	Contestant	Age	Hometown	Ref
(Acre (state)) Acre	Beatrys Albuquerque	18	Rio Branco	
(Amazonas (Brazilian state)) Amazonas	Klara Filizzola	20	Manaus	
Bahia	Nicolly Borges	22	Prado	
Brasília	Maria Tereza Oliveira	22	Uberlândia	
(São Paulo (state)) Centro Sul Paulistano	Jéssica Scandiuzzi Pedroso	24	Piracicaba	
(Bahia) Costa do Descobrimento	Yasmin Vitória	23	Itabela	
(Santa Catarina (state)) Costa Verde e Mar	Sarah Lemonie	20	Camboriú	
Espírito Santo	Nicole Guedes	26	Alfredo Chaves	
Goiás	Beatriz Custódio	21	Catalão	
(São Paulo (state)) Grande São Paulo	Emileidy Santos	25	São Paulo	
(Maranhão) Ilha de São Luís	Natália Seipel Nikolić	25	Goiânia	
(São Paulo (state)) Ipiranga	Isabelle Crystine	19	São Paulo	
Maranhão	Mabyan da Silva Bezerra	26	Santa Inês	
Mato Grosso	Cristiane Stipp Schavetock	25	Querência	
Mato Grosso do Sul	Danielle Cristinne Oliveira	25	Rio de Janeiro	
Minas Gerais	Yasmin Queiroz	22	Belo Horizonte	
Minas Gerais	Giovanna Ribeiro	23	Patrocínio	
(Rio Grande do Sul) Pampa Gaúcho	Emily Sari	21	Santa Maria	
Pará	Raquel Albuquerque	28	Ananindeua	
Paraíba	Mariana Yamamoto	20	São Paulo	
(Paraná (state)) Paraná	Giovanna Casagrande	24	Marília	
Pernambuco	Rayane Matos	21	Recife	
(São Paulo (state)) Região ABCD	Sara Tancredi	20	São Paulo	
(Rio de Janeiro (state)) Rio de Janeiro	Juliana Panaro	22	Niterói	
Rio Grande do Norte	Duda Santos	22	Natal	
Rio Grande do Sul	Joanna Camargo	26	Soledade	
Rondônia	Priscila Santos	24	Cacoal	
(Santa Catarina (state)) Santa Catarina	Liz Souza	25	Florianópolis	
(São Paulo (state)) São Paulo	Therezinha Marques	23	Barretos	
Sergipe	Vitória Andrade	21	Aracaju	
Tocantins	Jackelyne Emannuelle	21	Araguaína	

== Designations ==
Contestants under CNB organization that represented Brazil in 2025 pageants:

=== 2025 ===
Legenda
Declared as winner.
Ended as one of the runners-up.
Ended as one of the semifinalists.

Contestant (Placement)	Pageant	Placement
Jéssica Pedroso (Winner at Miss Brazil CNB 2024)	Miss World 2025 (Final: Hyderabad, India)	Top 08; Queen of Americas
Cristiane Stipp (1st runner-up at Miss Brazil CNB 2024)	Reinado Internacional del Café 2025 (Final: Manizales, Colombia)	Winner
Eduarda Braun (Winner at Miss Supranational Brazil 2025)	Miss Supranational 2025 (Final: Nowy Sacz, Poland)	Winner
Maiara Porto (4th runner-up at Miss Supranational Brazil 2025)	Miss Charm 2025 (Final: Ho Chi Minh City, Vietnam)	Top 12
Khrystma Siberth (Top 12 at Miss Supranational Brazil 2024)	Miss Progress International 2025 (Final: Santa Maria di Leuca, Italy)	Winner
Jéssica Bruxelas (Top 18 at Miss Supranational Brazil 2025)	Miss Wellness World 2025 (Final: Bangkok, Thailand)	Winner
Mirella Rodrigues (Winner at Miss Brazil CNB Teen 2025)	Miss Teen Mundial 2025 (Final: San Salvador, El Salvador)	Top 10
Gabriela Borges (1st runner-up at Miss Grand Brazil 2022)	Miss Cosmo 2025 (Final: Ho Chi Minh City, Vietnam)	Top 05; Best in Swimsuit
