= Ivanna McMahon =

Irish doctor and Miss Ireland 2022 (born 1994)

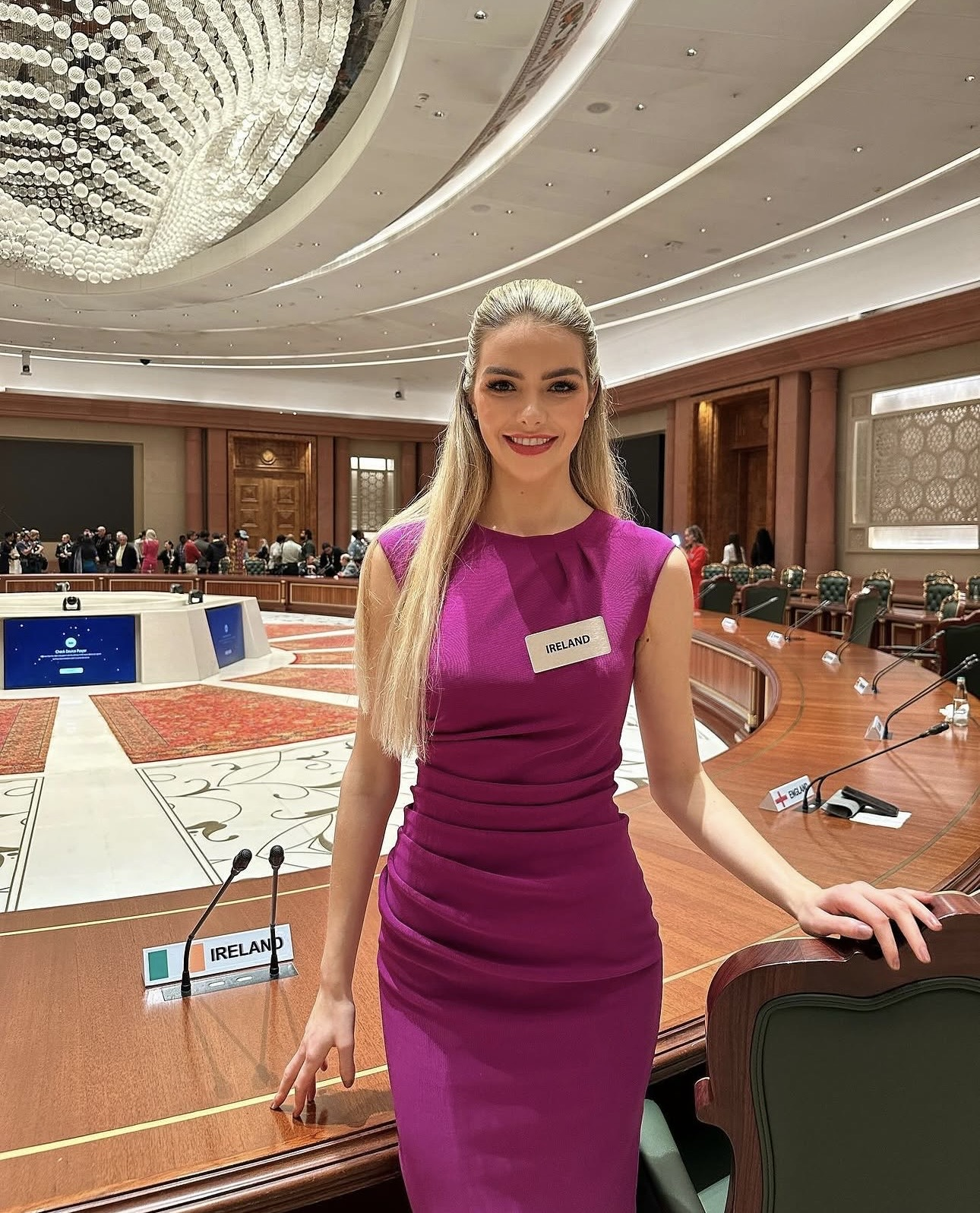
- McMahon in 2024
- Born: December 1994 (age 31); Barefield, County Clare, Ireland
- Occupations: Doctor, Model, Miss Ireland
- Beauty pageant titleholder
- Title: Miss Ireland 2022
- Hair colour: Blonde
- Eye colour: Blue
- Major competitions: Miss Ireland 2022 (Winner); Miss World 2023 (Unplaced)

Ivanna McMahon (born December 1994) is an Irish doctor, fashion model, and beauty pageant titleholder who was crowned Miss Ireland 2022 and represented her country at Miss World 2023.

== Career ==
Before her modeling career, McMahon studied medicine at University College Cork and graduated in 2020. She went on to do her internship at Cork University Hospital and did cardiology and neurology. Then she went to University Hospital Kerry to work in surgery. She worked in the GP Scheme at Tralee General Hospital throughout the pandemic.

In 2022 McMahon was crowned Miss Ireland. She went on to represent Ireland at the Miss World competition, where placed among the Top 25 of the Head to Head Challenge.

Since winning Miss Ireland, she has continued to work as a qualified doctor. She is a talented musician, particularly with the harp.

== Personal life ==
She has been diagnosed with dyslexia. She regularly visits schools to talk to children about dyslexia and the importance of education. She wishes to increase awareness about dyslexia.

Awards and achievements
Preceded by Pamela Uba	Miss Ireland; 2022	Succeeded by Jasmine Gerhardt
