= Chombo =

Chombo is a surname. Notable people with the surname include:

- Ignatius Chombo (born 1952), Zimbabwean politician
- Lesego Chombo (born 1998), Botswana politician
