= Namrata Shrestha (disambiguation) =

Namrata Shrestha may refer to:

- Namrata Shrestha, Nepalese actress
- Namrata Shrestha (model), Nepalese model who was crowned Miss World Nepal 2020
