= Frota =

Frota is a surname. Frota is a Portuguese surname that may have originated from warriors in northern Portugal, particularly around Viana do Castelo, who helped expel the Moors during the early formation of the Portuguese kingdom. The surname was also present among Sephardic Jews in Portugal. Although less common today, some Sephardic Jews and their descendants still carry the surname.

In Brazil, a significant genealogical study on the Frota family—its origins and descendants—was conducted by José Tupynambá da Frota.

Notable people with the surname include:

- Alexandre Frota (born 1963), Brazilian politician and former actor, model and porn star
- Leticía Frota (born 2003), Brazilian model and beauty pageant titleholder
- Lucas Frota (2000–2026), Brazilian record producer, musician and DJ
- Marcos Frota (born 1956), Brazilian actor, trapeze artist and businessman
- Roberto Frota (1939–2024), Brazilian actor, director, producer, writer, and theatre screenwriter
- Sylvio Frota (1910-1996), Brazilian army general and minister
- Vivaldo Frota (1928–2015), Brazilian politician, lawyer, and academic
