= Miss World Lesotho =

Beauty pageant

- Formation: 1979
- Type: Beauty pageant
- Headquarters: Maseru
- Location: Lesotho
- Members: Miss World
- Official language: English

Miss World Lesotho is a national Beauty pageant in Lesotho. The winner of this pageant goes to compete at Miss World pageant.

== History ==
Miss World Lesotho pageant was launched in 1979, It was also the first year Lesotho sent its first representative to the Miss World pageant that was Pauline Essie Kanedi of Maseru.

== Miss World Lesotho ==
Color key

- Declared as Winner
- Ended as runner-up
- Ended as one of the finalists or semifinalists

Year	Miss World Lesotho	Placement	Special Awards
1979	Pauline Essie Kanedi	Unplaced	
1980	Lits’ila Lerotholi	Unplaced	
1981	Palesa Joyce Kalele	Unplaced	
Did not compete between 1982 - 2002
2003	Makuena Lepolesa	Unplaced	
Did not compete between 2004 - 2009
2010	Karabelo Mokoallo	Unplaced	
Did not compete between 2011 - 2022
2023	Poelano Mothisig	Unplaced	
2024	No competition held		
2025	Lerato Masila	Unplaced	
