= Sofia Shamia =

Ukrainian model (born 2004)

Sofiia Shamiia
- Born: 7 October 2004 (age 22); Kyiv, Ukraine
- Beauty pageant titleholder
- Title: Miss Ukraine 2023
- Major competitions: Miss Ukraine 2023 (Winner); Miss World 2023 (Top 40)

Sofia Shamia (born 7 October 2004) is a Ukrainian model and beauty pageant titleholder who was crowned as Miss Ukraine 2023 and represented her country at Miss World 2023. Continental winner Beauty with a Purpose Europe.

After winning the national competition, Sofia publicly announced her intention to use her title to draw the international community’s attention to the consequences of Russia’s full-scale war against Ukraine. Her social work focuses on art therapy and supporting children affected by the war.

== Early life and education ==
Sofia was born in the Kyiv region into an international family (her mother is Ukrainian, her father is Jordanian). She studied at a local school and later entered the National University of Kyiv-Mohyla Academy, majoring in economics. Currently, she is a student at Bogomolets National Medical University. Among potential medical specializations, she is considering pediatrics or child psychiatry.

Since childhood, she has been actively involved in sports, particularly tennis and swimming. She also practiced dance for about seven years. Sofia speaks fluent English and is studying Arabic.

== Pageantry ==
=== Victory at Miss Ukraine 2023 ===
In the second half of 2023, Sofia Shamia took part in the national Miss Ukraine competition. Voting was conducted online through the contest’s official website. On September 26, Sofia was announced as the winner. At the time of receiving the title, she was 18 years old.

=== Participation in Miss World ===
As Miss Ukraine 2023, Sofia Shamia represented her country at the 71st Miss World international pageant, which took place on March 9, 2024, in India. During the international stage, Sofia became a quarterfinalist, ranking among the Top 40 contestants.

At the competition, she presented two symbolic looks: the national costume "The Forest Song", inspired by Lesya Ukrainka’s literary masterpiece of the same name, and the main evening gown "Lady of Steel", inspired by the Motherland Monument and its 2023 reconstruction.

=== Beauty with a Purpose Project ===
Within the framework of Miss World 2023, Sofia Shamia presented a charitable project under Beauty with a Purpose — a video dedicated to helping children suffering from the devastating consequences of war. In the video, she showcased how she organized a celebration for children at the Okhmatdyt National Specialized Children’s Hospital, led art therapy sessions, and held charity auctions of her own paintings to support those affected by the war.

The project received international recognition as the Best European Charity Initiative within Beauty with a Purpose — a key Miss World category that evaluates the social impact of participants’ initiatives.

== Activism and philanthropy ==
Sofia’s Instagram page features photos with her father, who, in the early days of Russia’s full-scale invasion, volunteered to join the Territorial Defense Forces. This fact, among others, became one of Sofia’s main motivations to direct her public activities toward helping soldiers, medical workers, and civilians affected by the war.

Her passion for painting transformed into a form of practical psychological support through art, with a primary focus on children.

Sofia Shamia is a regular patron and ambassador of the children’s center "City of Happy Children". She frequently conducts art therapy (Fluid Art) workshops for the center’s residents, as well as for children in Okhmatdyt Hospital and rehabilitation centers. She also develops original educational and psychological methods that combine creativity, learning, and emotional support.

At 18 years old, Sofia organized her first charity art auction, exhibiting a mini-collection of her own pop-surrealist paintings exploring themes of war and childhood in Ukraine.

Her painting "Eyes of Sorrow" was sold for $2,218 and sent to Japan. The funds were donated to Frontline Medics, a volunteer organization assisting civilians and military personnel on the front lines. Proceeds from the sale of another painting, "Lost Childhood", were directed to support the "Mriya" Educational and Rehabilitation Center for Children in Lviv.

=== Other activities and public image ===
Sofiia teaches runway walking and photo posing. On her Instagram page, she shares tips on photography and style, posts photos from beauty pageants, fashion shoots, and training sessions, and highlights the results of charitable initiatives. She also uses her platform to actively promote social messages and support Ukraine as a whole. Her dream is to adopt a child and give them a home filled with love.
