= Miss Somalia =

Beauty pageant

Miss Somali Organization
- Miss Somalia Organization
- Formation: 2021
- Founders: Hanikurlibah (Hani Abdi Gas)
- Type: Beauty pageant
- Headquarters: Mogadishu
- Location: Somalia
- Members: Miss World
- Official language: English; Arabic; Somali
- Website: misssomali.org

Miss Somali or Miss Somalia Organization is a national beauty pageant in Somalia that selects the country's representatives to the Miss World.

== History ==
Miss Somali is a national pageant in Somalia, organized by the Miss Somali Organization in 2021. On July 29, 2021, the organization launched the inaugural 'Miss Africa Calabar Somalia' pageant, where 17-year-old Saadiya Mahamed was crowned the first winner. In 2022, the organization received official certification as 'Miss Somalia Ltd.' from the Ministry of Commerce and Industry of the Federal Republic of Somalia.

=== Miss World Somalia ===
In 2021, Monica Akech, a young entrepreneur from Uganda, acquired the Miss World license for Somalia and sent the newly titled 'Miss World Somalia' to compete in Miss World 2022 in San Juan, Puerto Rico. The first winner, Khadija Omar, placed in the Top 13. The second titleholder, Bahja Mohamoud, won the 2024 edition and achieved a Top 40 placement at Miss World 2024 in India.

== Formats ==
The Miss Somalia competition is traditionally holding state and region representation every year. At the end of the competition, the Top 3 will be presented; Second Runner-up, First Runner-up, then finally Miss Somalia winner.

- Miss Banaadir
- Miss Galmudug
- Miss Hirshabelle
- Miss Jubaland
- Miss Khatumo
- Miss Puntland
- Miss Somaliland
- Miss South West (Koonfur Galbeed)

== Titleholders ==
Year	Miss Somalia	State & Region
2021	Saadiya Mahamed	Banaadir
2022	Iqra Ahmed Hassan	Jubaland
2023	Aisha Iikow	South West

=== Wins by state/region ===
Region	Titles	Years
South West	1	2023
Jubaland	1	2022
Banaadir	1	2021

== Somali representatives at international pageants ==
=== Miss Universe Somalia ===
- : Declared as Winner
- : Ended as runner-up or top 5/6 qualification
- : Ended as one of the finalists or semifinalists
- : Ended as special awards winner

Year	State/Region	Miss Universe Somalia	Placement at Miss Universe	Special Award(s)	Notes
Under Miss Universe Organization — a franchise holder to Miss Universe from 2024
2024	Banaadir	Khadija Omar	Unplaced		In 2024, Khadija was appointed by the Miss Universe Organization as Somalia's first-ever representative in the pageant’s history.

=== Miss World Somalia ===
- : Declared as Winner
- : Ended as runner-up or top 5/6 qualification
- : Ended as one of the finalists or semifinalists
- : Ended as special awards winner

Year	State/Region	Miss World Somalia	Placement at Miss World	Special Award(s)	Notes
Monica Akech directorship — a franchise holder to Miss World from 2022
2026	Mogadishu	Foziya Garad	Unplaced		
2025	Banaadir	Zainab Jama	Top 40		
2024	Hirshabelle	Bahja Mohamoud	Top 40		
Miss World 2023 was rescheduled to 2024 due to the change of host and when entering India as the new host, there were several issues that caused the postponement until March 2024.
Miss World 2021 was rescheduled to 16 March 2022 due to the COVID-19 pandemic outbreak in Puerto Rico, no edition started in 2022.
2021	Banaadir	Khadija Omar	Top 13		
