= Miss Nepal 2020 =

- Date: 5 December 2020
- Presenters: Sanjya Gupta
- Venue: Park Village Resort, Kathmandu, Nepal
- Broadcaster: Kantipur Television
- Entrants: 21
- Placements: 12
- Winner: Namrata Shrestha; Kathmandu

Hidden Treasures Ruslan FM 95.2 Miss Nepal 2020, the 25th Miss Nepal beauty pageant, which was held on 5 December 2020 in Kathmandu, Nepal. During the coronation night, four major winners were crowned as Miss World Nepal 2020, Miss Earth Nepal 2020, Miss International Nepal 2020 and Miss Supranational Nepal 2020. Miss Universe Nepal was removed as a new organisation was created to center on Miss Universe called Miss Universe Nepal which is under the national director who is Nepal's representative in Miss Earth 2012 and Miss Universe 2017, Nagma Shrestha.

The Top 5 winners of 2018 crowned their successors: Miss Nepal World 2019 Anushka Shrestha crowned Namrata Shrestha as Miss Nepal World 2020, Miss Nepal Earth 2019 Riya Basnet crowned Supriya Shrestha as Miss Nepal Earth 2020, Miss Nepal International 2019 Meera Kakshapati crowned Sandhya Sharma as Miss Nepal International 2020 and Chief Judge of Miss Nepal 2020 Meekha Mathema crowned Shimal Kanaujiya as Miss Nepal Supranational 2020.

In addition, the winners received Rs 250,000 as prize money for winning the title. The auditions of Miss Nepal were held from 8 to 24 March in Birtamode, Birgunj, Butwal, Chitwan, Dhangadhi, Dharan, Nepalgunj, Pokhara and Kathmandu along with one contestant from Livon Wild Card entry.

Kantipur Television broadcast the pageant live in Nepal and abroad.

== Results ==
Color keys

- The contestant was a Semi-Finalist in an International pageant.
- The contestant was not able to compete in an International pageant.
- The contestant did not place.

Placement	Contestant	International pageant	International Results
Miss Nepal 2020	Kathmandu – Namrata Shrestha	Miss World 2021	Top 40; Head-to-Head Challenge (Round 1 & 2); Top 10 - Beauty with a Purpose; Top 10 - Miss Multimedia
1st Runner-Up (Miss Earth Nepal 2020)	Kathmandu – Supriya Shrestha	Miss Earth 2021	Unplaced
2nd Runner-Up (Miss International Nepal 2020)	Mahottari – Sandhya Sharma (●)	Miss International 2022	Did not compete
3rd Runner-Up (Miss Supranational Nepal 2020)	Kathmandu – Shimal Kanaujiya	Miss Supranational 2021	Unplaced
Top 6	Kathmandu – Ayesha Shrestha; Kathmandu – Merisa Singh Suwal		
Top 12	Kathmandu – Arnica Rajbhandari; Kathmandu – Astika Shrestha; Kathmandu – Pragati Shrestha; Kathmandu – Riya Shrestha; Kathmandu – Sajana Panta; Ramechhap – Sija Chaulagain		

(●): The candidate is the winner of Miss Popular Choice (online voting) and got direct entry into Top 12 semi-Finalists.

=== Sub-titles ===
Award	Contestant
Goldstar Miss Fitness	(Nepal) Bhaktapur – Shubhangi Khatri
IME Pay Beauty with a Purpose	(Nepal) Mahottari - Sandhya Sharma
Miss Confident	Kathmandu - Namrata Shrestha
The Kathmandu Post Miss Intellectual	Kathmandu - Namrata Shrestha
Nepal Tourism Board Miss Tourism	Kathmandu - Riya Shrestha
Creative D Studio Miss Photogenic	Kathmandu - Astika Shrestha
Altroz Miss Stylish	Kathmandu - Merisa Singh Suwal
Ruslan Woman of Substance	(Nepal) Mahottari - Sandhya Sharma
Berger Miss Glamour	Kathmandu - Yojana Bhattarai
Livon Life Miss Popular Choice	(Nepal) Mahottari - Sandhya Sharma
Nepal Mediciti Miss Healthy	(Nepal) Chitwan - Neha Sarkar

=== Judges ===
- Mr Sixit Bhatta - Founder of Tootle Nepal
- Mrs Tulika Agrawal - Executive Director of MAW Foundation Nepal
- Mr Karan Vaidya - Vice President of Vaidya Group
- Ms Nikita Chandak - Winner of Miss Nepal 2017 and Top 40 Semifinalist of Miss World 2017
- Dr. Pukar Malla - Founder and Chairperson of Daayitwa Nepal
- Dr. Raj Rana - Medical Superintendent of Nepal Mediciti Hospital
- Ms Priti Sitoula - Winner of Miss Nepal 2003
- Mr Suman Shakya - Founder of SmartPaani Nepal
- Mrs Swastima Khadka - Cine Artist of Nepali Cinema (Kollywood)
- Capt. Priya Adhikari - Helicopter Rescue Pilot
- Ms Meekha Mathema - Educationist

=== Contestants ===
#	Contestants	Age	Height	Home Town	Education
1	Aayushma Shrestha	19	1.64 m (5 ft 4 1/2 in)	Chitwan, Chitwan District	BAS (pursuing)
2	Rajani Chaudhary	21	1.83 m (6 ft 0 in)	Morang, Morang District	BBS
3	Shubhangi Khatri	21	1.65 m (5 ft 5 in)	Bhaktapur, Bhaktapur District	BDSC (pursuing)
4	Arnica Rajbhandari	25	1.65 m (5 ft 5 in)	Kathmandu, Kathmandu District	MENM
5	Junu Twayana	23	1.65 m (5 ft 5 in)	Bhaktapur, Bhaktapur District	BEng (Civil)
6	Yojana Bhattarai	24	1.65 m (5 ft 5 in)	Kathmandu, Kathmandu District	BBS (pursuing)
7	Nigata KC	24	1.64 m (5 ft 5 in)	Dang, Dang District	MBBS
8	Sija Chaulagain	24	1.67 m (5 ft 6 in)	Ramechhap, Ramechhap District	BBA (pursuing)
9	Sajana Panta	25	1.63 m (5 ft 4 in)	Kathmandu, Kathmandu District	CA (semi-qualified)
10	Riya Shrestha	22	1.70 m (5 ft 7 in)	Kathmandu, Kathmandu District	BSEE
11	Ayesha Shrestha	24	1.73 m (5 ft 8 in)	Kathmandu, Kathmandu District	BEng (Civil)
12	Merisa Singh Suwal	23	1.67 m (5 ft 6 in)	Kathmandu, Kathmandu District	BBA (pursuing)
13	Neha Sarkar	23	1.67 m (5 ft 6 in)	Chitwan, Chitwan District	MBBS (pursuing)
14	Shimal Kanaujiya	24	1.63 m (5 ft 4 in)	Kathmandu, Kathmandu District	MBA (pursuing)
15	Sona Shrestha	24	1.73 m (5 ft 8 in)	Kavre, Kavrepalanchok District	BMLT
16	Rushmita Shahi	23	1.64 m (5 ft 5 in)	Kathmandu, Kathmandu District	BHM (pursuing)
17	Supriya Shrestha	24	1.64 m (5 ft 5 in)	Kathmandu, Kathmandu District	BSW
18	Namrata Shrestha	23	1.65 m (5 ft 5 in)	Kathmandu, Kathmandu District	MSSc
19	Sandhya Sharma	24	1.63 m (5 ft 4 in)	Mahottari, Mahottari District	BSc in Forestry, MSc (pursuing)
20	Pragati Shrestha	24	1.62 m (5 ft 4 in)	Kathmandu, Kathmandu District	BBA (pursuing)
21	Astika Shrestha	25	1.63 m (5 ft 4 in)	Kathmandu, Kathmandu District	MBBS (pursuing)

(●) The winner of Livon Life Miss Popular Choice (online voting) got direct entry in Top 12 Semi-Finalists.

== Previous Experience ==
- (#) Arnica Rajbhandari participated in Model Hunt Nepal 2017 and won the subtitle "Socially Responsible".
- (#) Junu Twayana competed in Miss Newa 1137.
- (#) Yojana Bhattarai was the winner of Miss Diva Nepal 2018.
- (#) Sajana Panta won Model Superstar Nepal Season 2.
- (#) Ayesha Shrestha was placed in the Top 5 in Miss Intercontinental Nepal 2017.
- (#) Rushmita Shahi was the winner of Princess Nepal 2014.
- (#) Namrata Shrestha was placed in the Top 5 in Miss Nepal 2016.
- (#) Pragati Shrestha was the winner of Miss BBA 2016.
