= Doora-Barefield =

Parish in County Clare, Ireland

Doora Barefield
- Catholic parish
- Location within Ireland
- Coordinates: 52°49′56″N 8°55′09″W
- Country: Ireland
- Province: Munster
- County: County Clare
- Time zone: UTC+0 (WET)
  - Summer (DST): UTC-1 (IST (WEST))

Doora-Barefield is a parish in County Clare, Ireland, and part of the Abbey grouping of parishes within the Roman Catholic Diocese of Killaloe. It lies to the north and east of the town of Ennis and includes the suburb of Roslevan in the eastern part of Ennis.

The parish is an amalgamation of the medieval parishes of Doora, Kilraghtis and Templemaley.

Current (2025) co-parish priest is Fr. Tom Fitzpatrick.

== Churches ==
There are three churches in the parish: The main church is the St. Brecan's Church in the village of Doora. This cruciform church was built in 1836.

The second church of the parish is the Church of Immaculate Conception in Barefield. This rectangular church is built in 1874, replacing a thatched building nearby.

The third and newest church of the parish is Our Lady's Church in Roslevan. This chapel shares the building with Fahy's Hall, the community centre for Roslevan. Its church space is rectangular but can be made more cruciform with the shared space from the hall. It officially opened in 2012. It is a replacement of the Our Lady's Church at the site of the former Our Lady's Hospital on Gort Road in Ennis. When the hospital closed in 2002, it lost its primary function as hospital church. Out of the way of the main population centres, with dwindling numbers and the lease expiring, this 1942-built church was closed in 2010 and the relics moved to the church in Barefield. The church is now abandoned and in decay.

== gallery ==
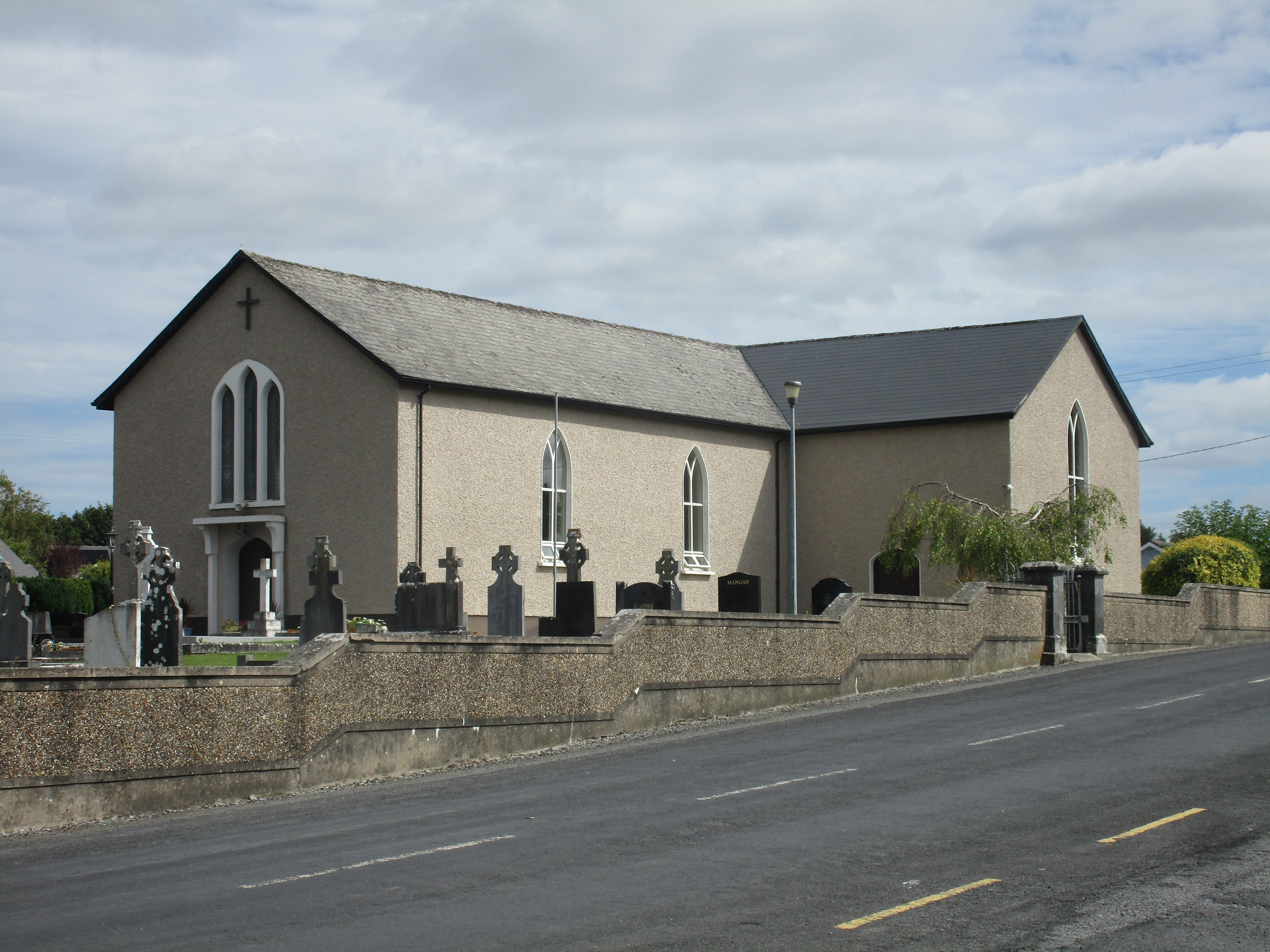
Church of St. Breckan in Doora.

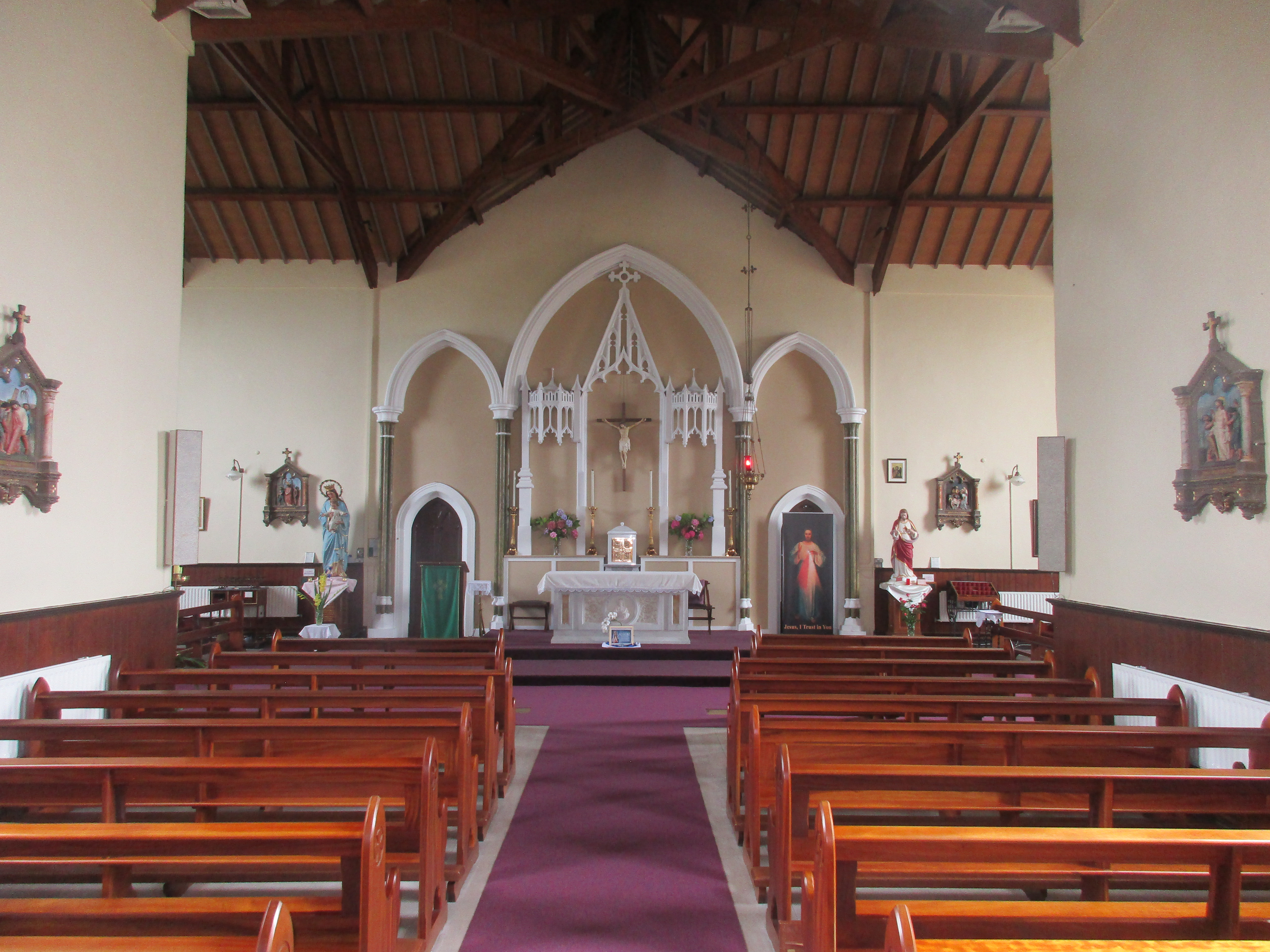
Altar of the Church of St. Breckan

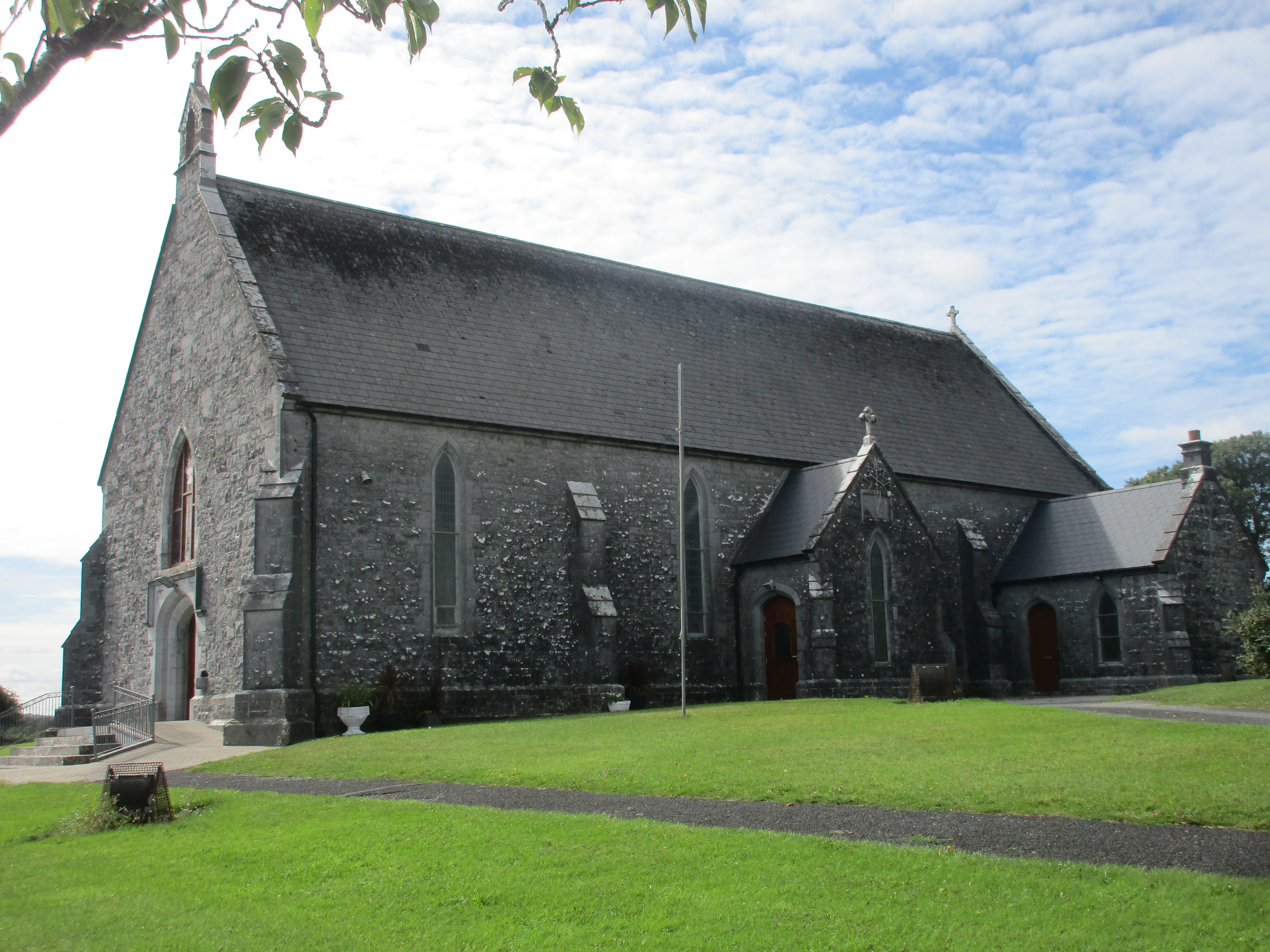
Church of the Immaculate Conception in Barefield

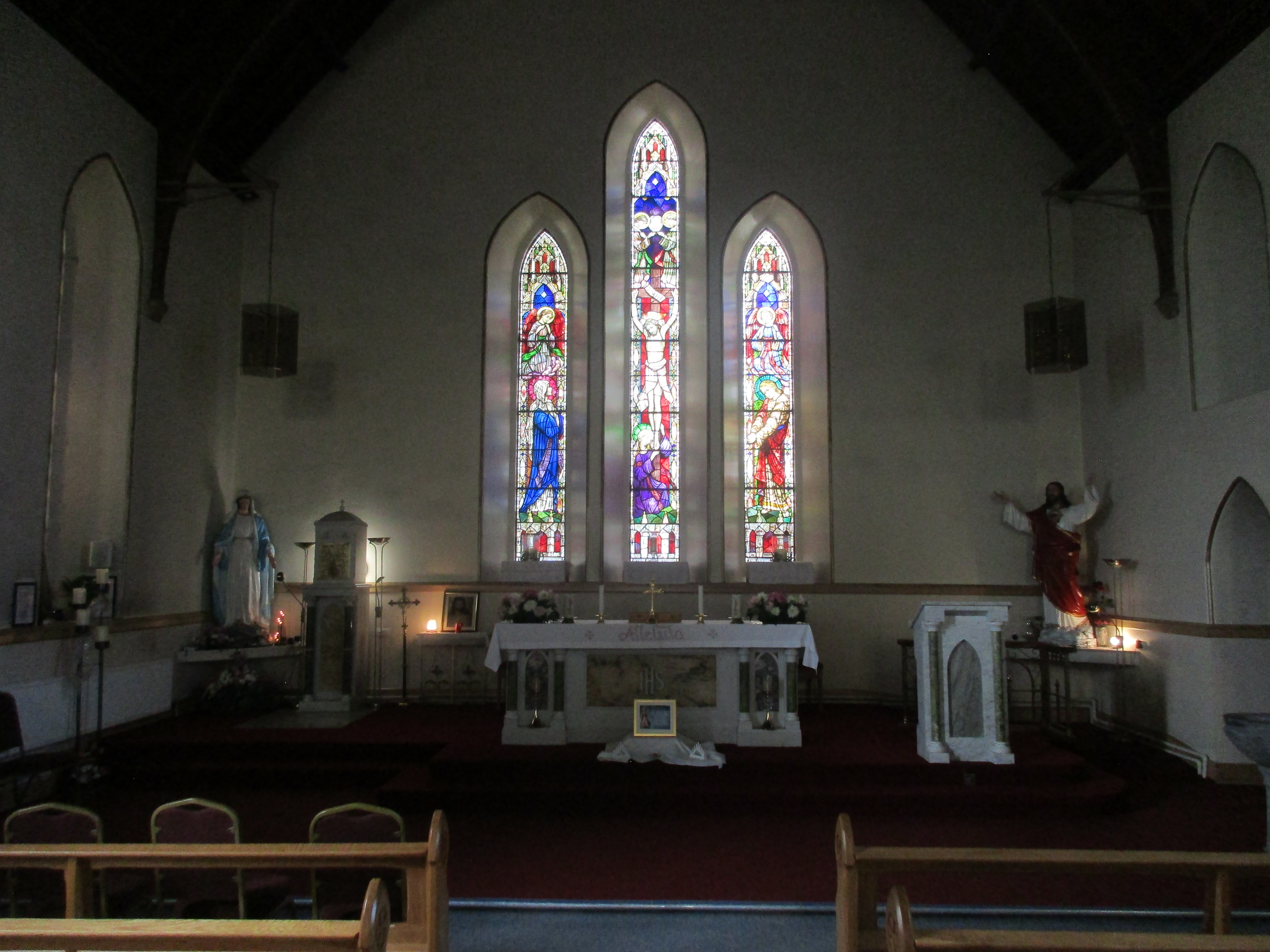
Altar of the Church of the Immaculate Conception

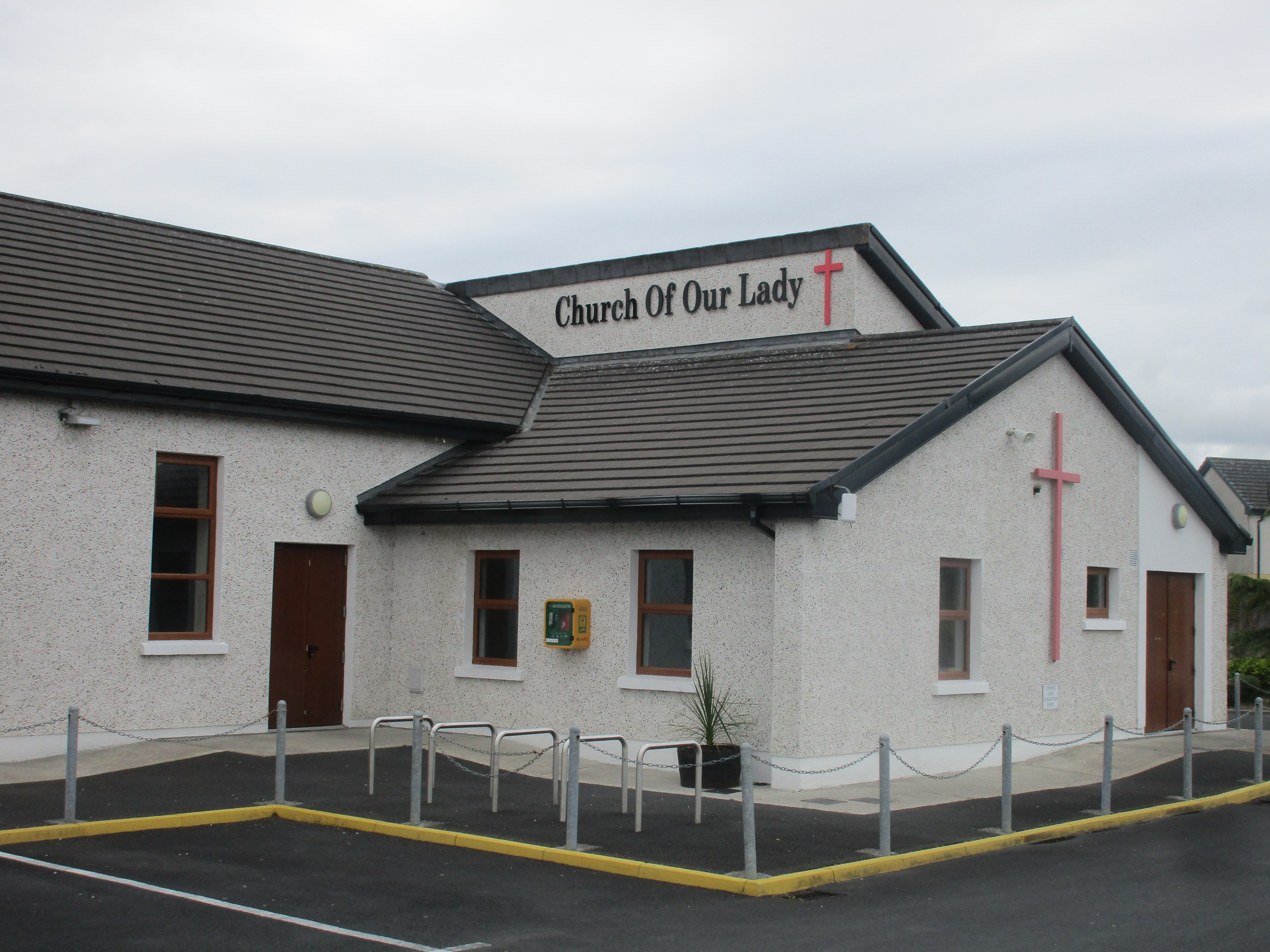
Church of Our Lady Roslevan

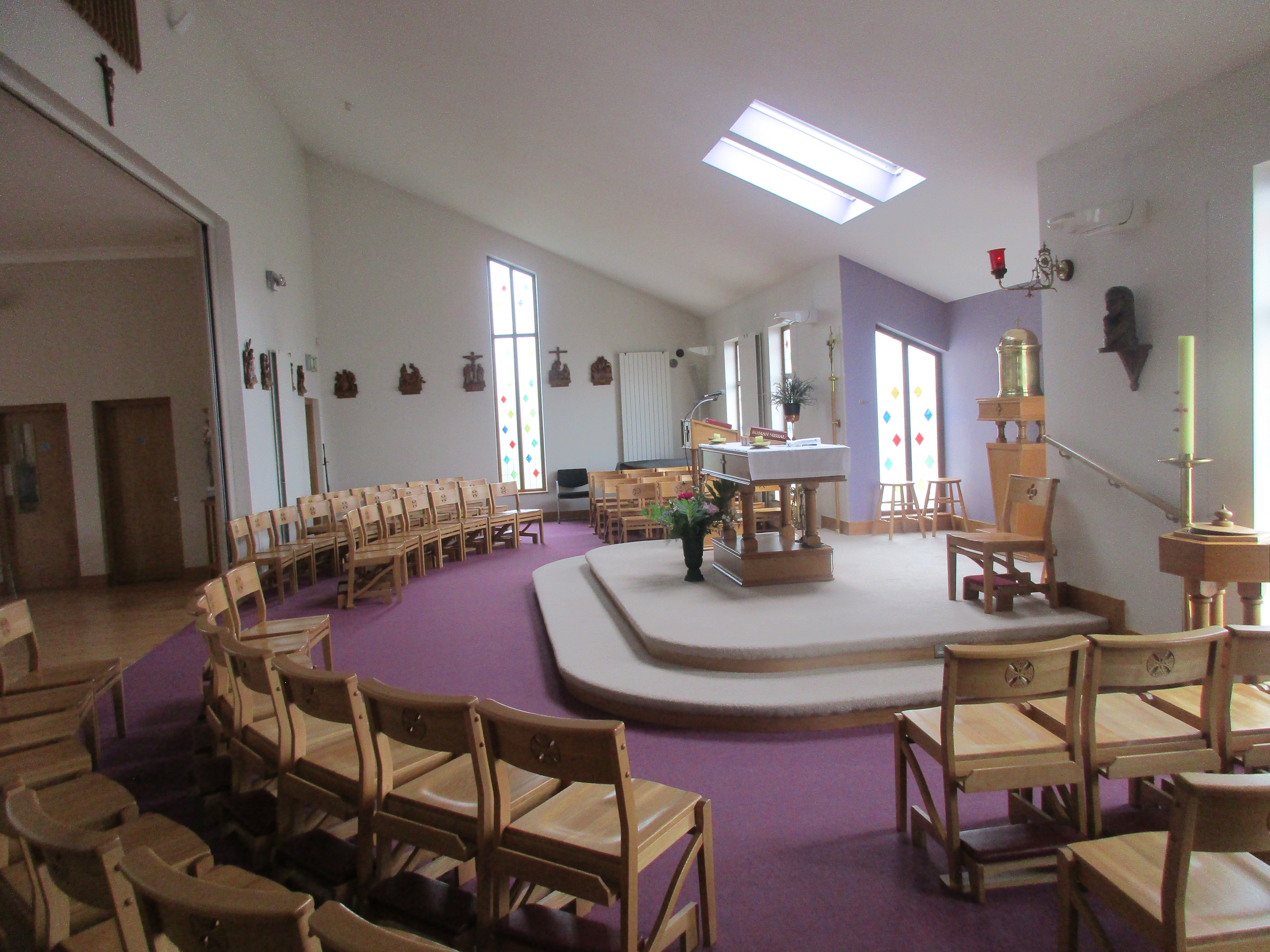
Altar of the Church of Our Lady Roslevan. On the left the shared space with Fahy's Hall (non-carpeted)

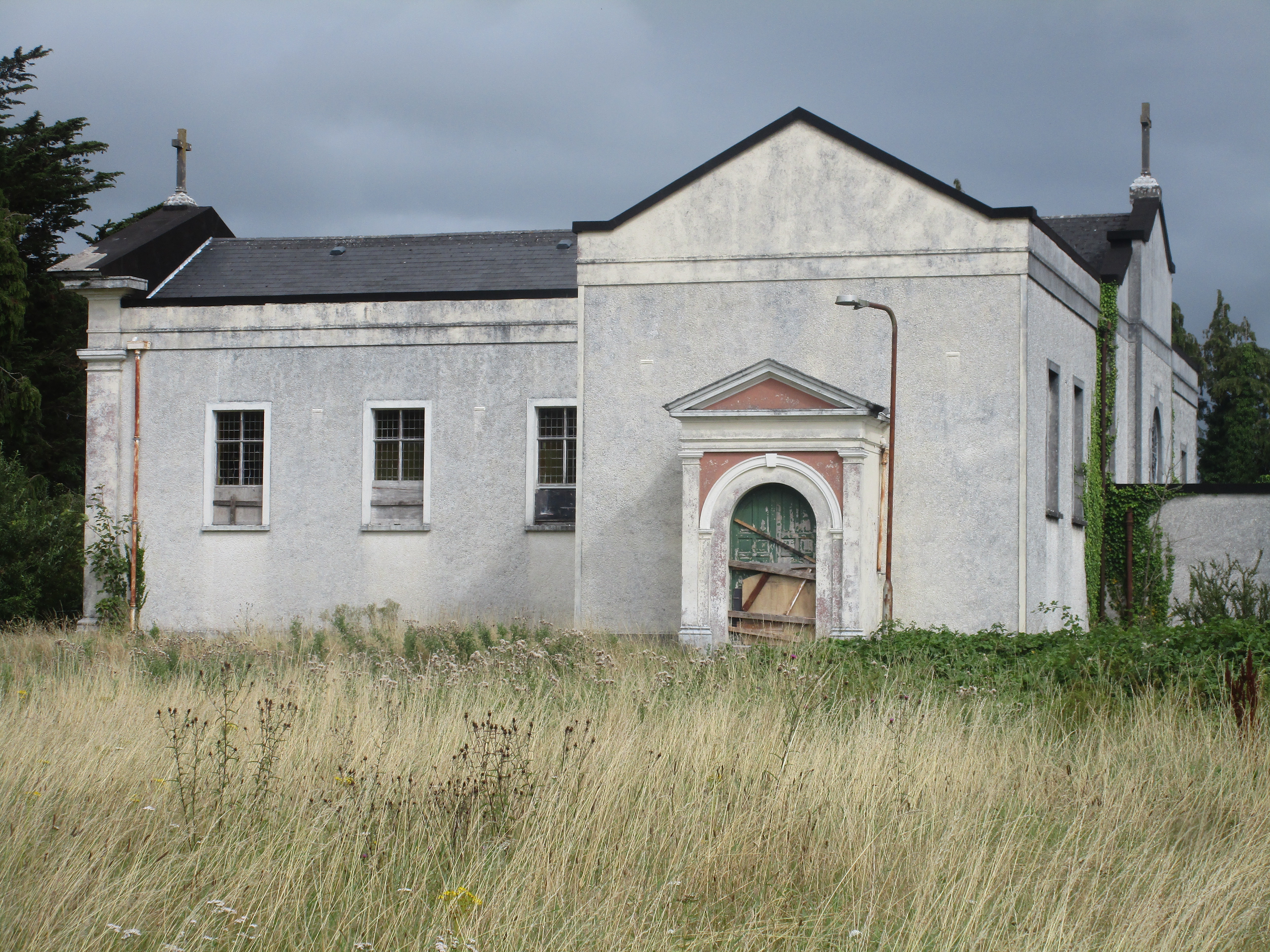
The closed Our Lady's Church, Gort Road

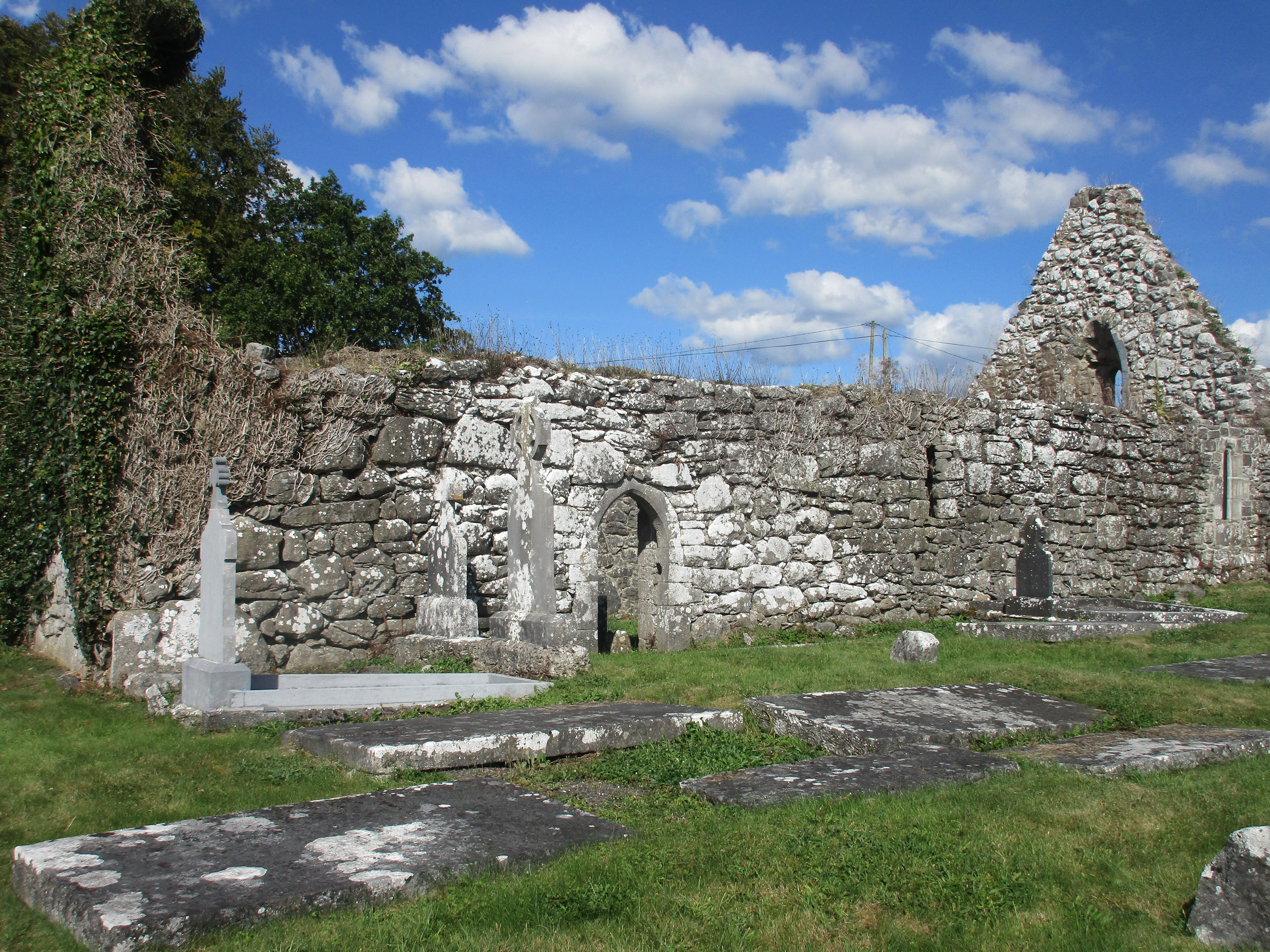
The ruin of Templemaley Church

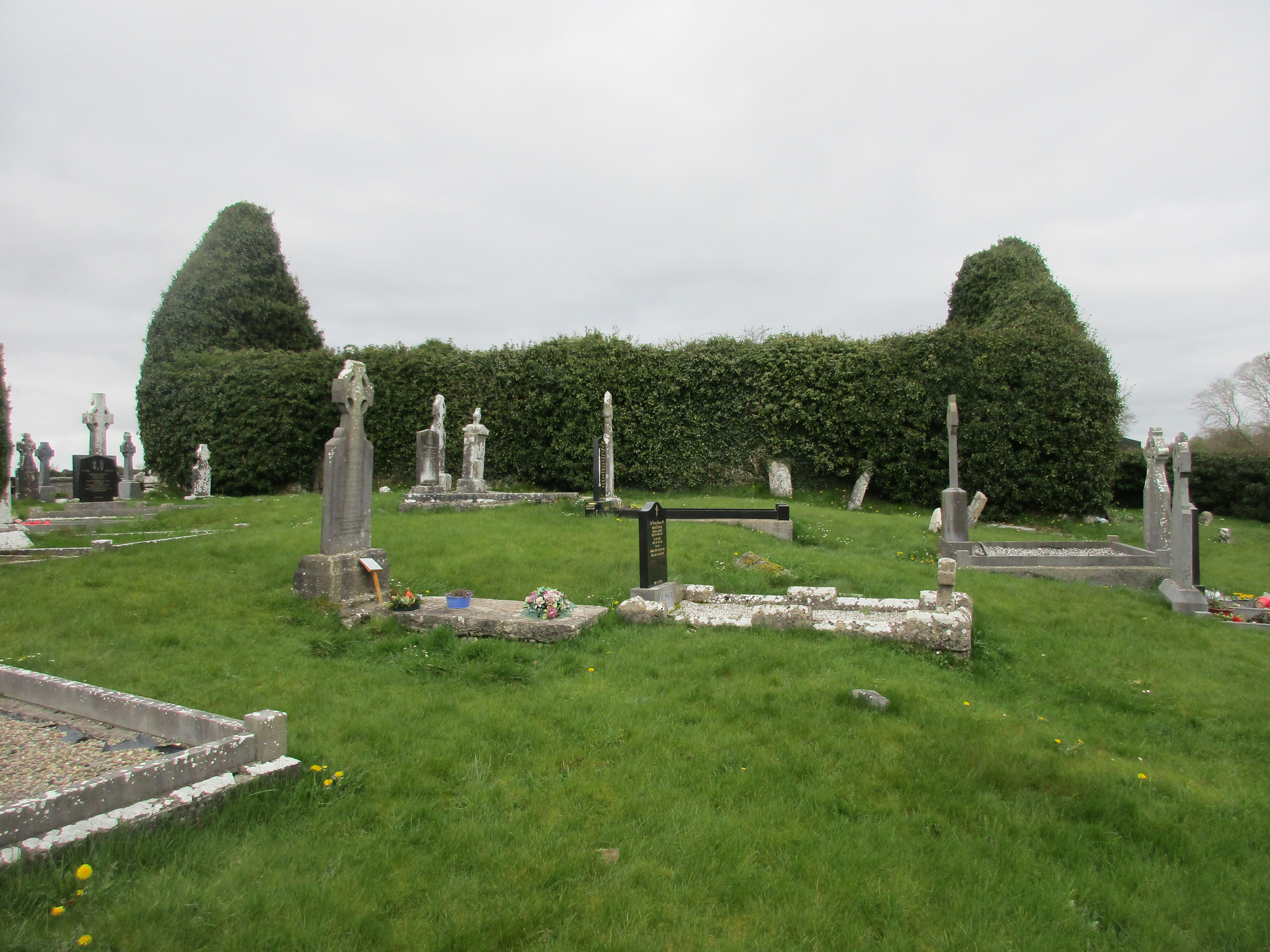
The ruin of Kilraghtis Church
