= Aché Abrahams =

Trinidadian fashion model and beauty pageant titleholder

- Born: Aché Abrahams
- Occupation: Fashion model
- Beauty pageant titleholder
- Title: Miss Trinidad and Tobago 2022; Miss World Caribbean 2023
- Major competitions: Miss Trinidad and Tobago 2022 (Winner); Miss World 2023 (Top 4) (Miss World Caribbean)

Aché Abrahams is a Trinidadian fashion model and beauty pageant titleholder who won Miss Trinidad and Tobago 2022. She represented Trinidad and Tobago at the Miss World 2023 pageant, and reached the top four. She was awarded the continental title of Miss World Caribbean 2023.

== Early life and education ==
Aché Abrahams was raised in Trinidad and Tobago, where she spent much of her early life in the Maracas Valley community. She attended St. Joseph’s Convent in St. Joseph, Trinidad and Tobago, where she completed her secondary education. Following her graduation, Abrahams trained in the performing arts and completed an acting program at the Identity School of Acting in London, England.

== Pageantry ==
On 6 November 2022, Abrahams won Miss Trinidad and Tobago 2022, held at the National Academy for the Performing Arts in Port of Spain, against sixteen other finalists. She was crowned by the outgoing titleholder, Jeanine Brandt. This allowed her to represent Trinidad and Tobago at Miss World 2023 at the Jio World Convention Centre in Mumbai, India, where she reached the top four. During the fast-track events, she reached the top 25 in the Head-to-Head Challenge, the top 23 of the Talent Challenge, and the top 10 of the Beauty with a Purpose challenge. Abrahams was the highest-placing contestant from the Caribbean, and was awarded the title of Miss World Caribbean 2023. Abrahams' was the highest placement achieved by a Trinidad and Tobago representative at the Miss World pageant since Gabrielle Walcott finished as second runner-up in 2008. On 4 September 2024, Abrahams was third runner up at Miss World 2023.

Awards and achievements
Preceded by DOM Emmy Peña	Miss World Caribbean; 2023	Succeeded by MTQ Aurélie Joachim
Preceded by Jeanine Brandt	Miss Trinidad and Tobago; 2022	Succeeded by Anna-Lise Nanton
