= Miss Brazil CNB 2022 =

32nd Miss Brazil CNB pageant

- Date: August 4, 2022
- Presenters: Juliano Crema; Lorena Rodrigues
- Venue: CAESB Theatre, Águas Claras, Distrito Federal, Brazil
- Broadcaster: Livestream (YouTube)
- Entrants: 36
- Placements: 20
- Winner: Leticía Frota; Amazonas
- Congeniality: Marina Netto; Plano Piloto
- Photogenic: Ingredy Lope; Rondônia

Miss Brazil CNB 2022 was the 32nd edition of the Miss Brazil CNB pageant and the 7th edition under CNB Miss Brazil was held on August 4, 2022 at the CAESB Theatre in Águas Claras, Distrito Federal, Brazil. Each state, the Federal District and various Insular Regions & Cities competed for the title. Caroline Teixeira of Distrito Federal crowned her successor, Letícia Frota of Amazonas, at the end of the contest, who represented Brazil at Miss World 2023. At Miss World, Frota placed in the Top 8 and won the Miss World Americas title.

== Results ==
Color keys

- The contestant won in an International pageant.
- The contestant was a Finalist/Runner-up in an International pageant.
- The contestant was a Semi-Finalist in an International pageant.
- The contestant did not place.

=== Placements ===
Miss Brasil Mundo 2022 was broadcast live via Miss World official YouTube on August 4, 2022.

| Final results | Contestant | Ref. | International Placement |
|---|---|---|---|
| Miss Brazil CNB 2022/2023; Miss Brasil Mundo 2022/2023 | Amazonas - Letícia Frota | | Top 8/Miss World Americas - Miss World 2023 |
| 1st Runner-Up | Espírito Santo - Gabrielle Araújo | | |
| 2nd Runner-Up | São Paulo - Ana Manginelli | | |
| 3rd Runner-Up | (Bahia) Recôncavo Baiano - Isabella Gregorutti | | |
| 4th Runner-Up | Rio Grande do Norte - Thuany Medeiros | | |
| Top 8 | Pará - Maria Carolina Costa; Maranhão - Danielly Martins Δ §; Mato Grosso do Sul - Hemilly Duarte | | |
| Top 15 | Alagoas - Carolina Borsatto Δ; (São Paulo (state)) Baixada Santista - Giovanna Coltro; Brasília - Gabriella Soares; Pernambuco - Luana Ferreira; (São Paulo (state)) Região ABCD - Kauany Izi; Rio Grande do Sul - Tainá Laydner; Santa Catarina - Lara Mateus Δ | | |
| Top 20 | Bahia - Rebeca Brasil; Ceará - Dominique Neves Δ; Minas Gerais - Karina Almeida; Paraná - Marcela Germano; Plano Piloto - Marina Netto Δ | | |

Notes:

§ – placed into the Top 8 as the winner of Beauty with a Purpose Winner

Δ – placed into the Top 20 by fast-track challenges

=== Regional Queens of Beauty ===
| Award | Winner |
|---|---|
| Miss Midwest | Mato Grosso do Sul - Hemilly Duarte |
| Miss North | Pará - Maria Carolina Costa |
| Miss Northeast | (Bahia) Recôncavo Baiano - Isabella Gregorutti |
| Miss South | Rio Grande do Sul - Tainá Laydner |
| Miss Southeast | Espírito Santo - Gabrielle Araújo |

=== Special awards ===
| Final Results | | Contestant | Ref. |
|---|---|---|---|
| EVENTOS DE CLASSIFICAÇÃO (Fast-track) | Commercial Challenge (dōTERRA) | Ceará - Dominique Neves | |
| EVENTOS DE CLASSIFICAÇÃO (Fast-track) | Commercial Challenge (La Renovence) | Plano Piloto - Marina Netto | |
| EVENTOS DE CLASSIFICAÇÃO (Fast-track) | Best Regional Costume | Santa Catarina - Lara Mateus | |
| EVENTOS DE CLASSIFICAÇÃO (Fast-track) | Miss Popularity | Plano Piloto - Marina Netto | |
| EVENTOS DE CLASSIFICAÇÃO (Fast-track) | Talent | Alagoas - Carolina Borsatto | |
| EVENTOS DE CLASSIFICAÇÃO (Fast-track) | Beauty With a Purpose (Top 3) | Alagoas - Carolina Borsatto; Maranhão - Danielly Martins; Santa Catarina - Lara Mateus | |
| PRÊMIOS ESPECIAIS (Special Awards) | Miss Congeniality | Plano Piloto - Marina Netto | |
| PRÊMIOS ESPECIAIS (Special Awards) | Miss Personality | (São Paulo (state)) Baixada Santista - Giovanna Coltro | |
| PRÊMIOS ESPECIAIS (Special Awards) | Miss Photogenic | Rondônia - Ingredy Lope | |

== Delegates ==
36 delegates competed for Miss Brasil Mundo 2022:

| Represented | Contestant | Age (Note: Ages at the time of the pageant) | Hometown | Placement | Ref. |
|---|---|---|---|---|---|
| Agreste Pernambucano | Alice Ridenn | 21 | Surubim, PE | | |
| Alagoas | Carolina Borsatto | 27 | | Top 15 | |
| Amazonas | Letícia Frota | 19 | Manaus | Miss Brazil CNB 2022; Miss Mundo Brasil 2022 | |
| Bahia | Rebeca Brasil | 22 | Camaçari | Top 20 | |
| (São Paulo (state)) Baixada Santista | Giovanna Coltro | 25 | São Vicente SP | Top 15 | |
| Brasília | Gabriella Soares | 22 | Brasília, DF | Top 15 | |
| Ceará | Dominique Neves | 25 | Fortaleza | Top 20 | |
| (Goiás) Centro Goiano | Laura Thereza de Araújo | 22 | | | |
| Espírito Santo | Gabrielle Araújo | 24 | | 1st Runner-Up | |
| (Minas Gerais) Estrada Real | Hellena da Fonsêca | 26 | Betim, MG | | |
| Goiás | Verônica Abreu | 21 | | | |
| Grande São Paulo | Bruna Brito | | | | |
| Guanabara | Sunamita Rubim | 17 | Rio de Janeiro, RJ | | |
| (Mato Grosso) Ilhas do Araguaia | Iara Kintschev | 24 | | | |
| Ipiranga | Beatriz Soares | | | | |
| Maranhão | Danielly Martins | 24 | | Top 8 | |
| Mato Grosso | Ana Flávia Reis | 24 | | | |
| Mato Grosso do Sul | Hemilly Duarte | 20 | | Top 8 | |
| Minas Gerais | Karina Almeida | 24 | | Top 20 | |
| (Mato Grosso) Pantanal | Vitória Corvalan | | | | |
| Pará | Maria Carolina Costa | 21 | | Top 8 | |
| Paraíba | Vitória Rodrigues | 20 | João Pessoa | | |
| Paraná | Marcela Germano | 26 | | Top 20 | |
| Pernambuco | Luana Ferreira | 20 | Sertânia | Top 15 | |
| Piauí | Bárbara Veras | | | | |
| Planalto Central | Amanda Teles | | Brasília, DF | | |
| Plano Piloto | Marina Netto | 24 | Brasília, DF | Top 20 | |
| (Bahia) Recôncavo Baiano | Isabella Gregorutti | 20 | | 3rd Runner-Up | |
| (São Paulo (state)) Região ABCD | Kauany Izi | 23 | | Top 15 | |
| Região Centro Paulista | Gabriela Souza | | | | |
| Rio de Janeiro | Diana Fidalgo | | | | |
| Rio Grande do Norte | Thuany Medeiros | 22 | | 4th Runner-Up | |
| Rio Grande do Sul | Tainá Laydner | 26 | | Top 15 | |
| Rondônia | Ingredy Lopes | | | | |
| Santa Catarina | Lara Mateus | 20 | Itajaí | Top 15 | |
| São Paulo | Ana Manginelli | 25 | São José do Rio Preto | 2nd Runner-Up | |

== Notes ==
=== Withdrawals ===
- (Santa Catarina (state)) Costa Verde & Mar - Sarah Lemonie
- (Rio Grande do Sul) Pampa Gaúcho - Fernanda Craz
