= Hylda Queally =

Irish talent agent

- Born: 1961 (age 64–65); Barefield, County Clare, Ireland
- Occupation: Talent agent
- Years active: 1988–present
- Children: 3

Hylda Queally (born 1961) is an Irish talent agent in the Hollywood film industry. She is an agent for a number of major actresses such as Kate Winslet, Cate Blanchett, Marion Cotillard, Michelle Williams, Lupita Nyong'o, Penélope Cruz, Noomi Rapace, Jessica Chastain, Brit Marling, Daisy Ridley and Elizabeth Debicki. She has been ranked by Elle and other publications as one of the most powerful women in Hollywood.

== Early years ==
Queally was born in 1961 in Barefield in County Clare, Ireland. She was inspired by her father, a set dancer. Queally has two younger siblings, a brother, Raymond, and a sister, Stephanie. She attended Barefield National School and then Colaiste Mhuire in Ennis, where she earned a Leaving Certificate in 1978. Queally subsequently worked as a banker for AIB and for Aer Rianta at Shannon.

== Career ==
Queally emigrated to the US in 1989. She initially joined Triad Artists then the William Morris Agency. In early 1999, she became the Senior Vice-President and North American head of William Morris. She joined Creative Artists Agency (CAA) in 2004, and is employed or has been employed as an agent by actors such as Kate Winslet, Cate Blanchett, Marion Cotillard, Michelle Williams, Matthias Schoenaerts, Lupita Nyong'o, Noomi Rapace, Lily-Rose Depp, Bérénice Bejo, Mélanie Laurent, Hilary Swank, Brad Pitt, Penélope Cruz, Daisy Ridley, William Hurt, Robin Wright, Joseph Fiennes, Frances McDormand, John Malkovich, Nigel Hawthorne, Miranda Richardson, Rufus Sewell, Eddie Izzard, Mathieu Amalric, Sam Riley, Tom Sturridge, Ben Wishaw, Katie Holmes, Robson Green, Rose Byrne and Elizabeth Debicki.

Queally discovered actresses such as Elena Anaya (The Skin I Live In), Jessica Chastain (The Tree of Life and Take Shelter) and Brit Marling, writer and actor of Sound of My Voice and Another Earth.

Elle magazine has named Queally as one of the most powerful women in Hollywood several years running, and in 2011 The Hollywood Reporter ranked her 52nd in the women's power 100 list.

In 2016, she received the Sue Mengers Award, an award for excellence in artist representation from Women in Film presented by Cate Blanchett at Women in Film Crystal + Lucy Awards.

== Personal life ==
Queally lives in Pacific Palisades in the Westside region of Los Angeles, with her husband, Brad, a computer engineer and musician, and their three children.
