= Priyanka Rani Joshi =

Miss Nepal World 2022

- Born: Kathmandu, Nepal
- Height: 5 ft 5 in (165 cm)
- Beauty pageant titleholder
- Title: Miss Nepal World 2022
- Years active: 2020 - present
- Hair color: black
- Major competitions: Miss Nepal World 2022 (Winner); Miss World 2023 (Top 40)

Priyanka Rani Joshi is a Nepalese beauty pageant titleholder who won Miss Nepal World 2022. She represented Nepal at Miss World 2023 where she was placed in the top 40.

== Pageantry ==
=== Miss Nepal 2022 ===
Joshi won Miss Nepal World 2022, succeeding Namrata Shrestha, and received a Rs 250,000 cash prize and a scooter.

=== Miss World 2023 ===
Joshi represented Nepal at Miss World 2023 held in Mumbai, India on March 8, 2024. She became the 21st winner of the Miss Nepal World title, and also the first Miss Nepal to advance in the sport challenge, reaching the top 32. She was selected from the top eight from the Asia and Oceania group. Joshi reached the top 25 of the head to head challenge, but did not reach the top five.

Awards and achievements
Preceded by Namrata Shrestha	Miss Nepal World; 2022	Incumbent
