= Lesego Chombo =

Motswana politician and beauty pagaent title holder

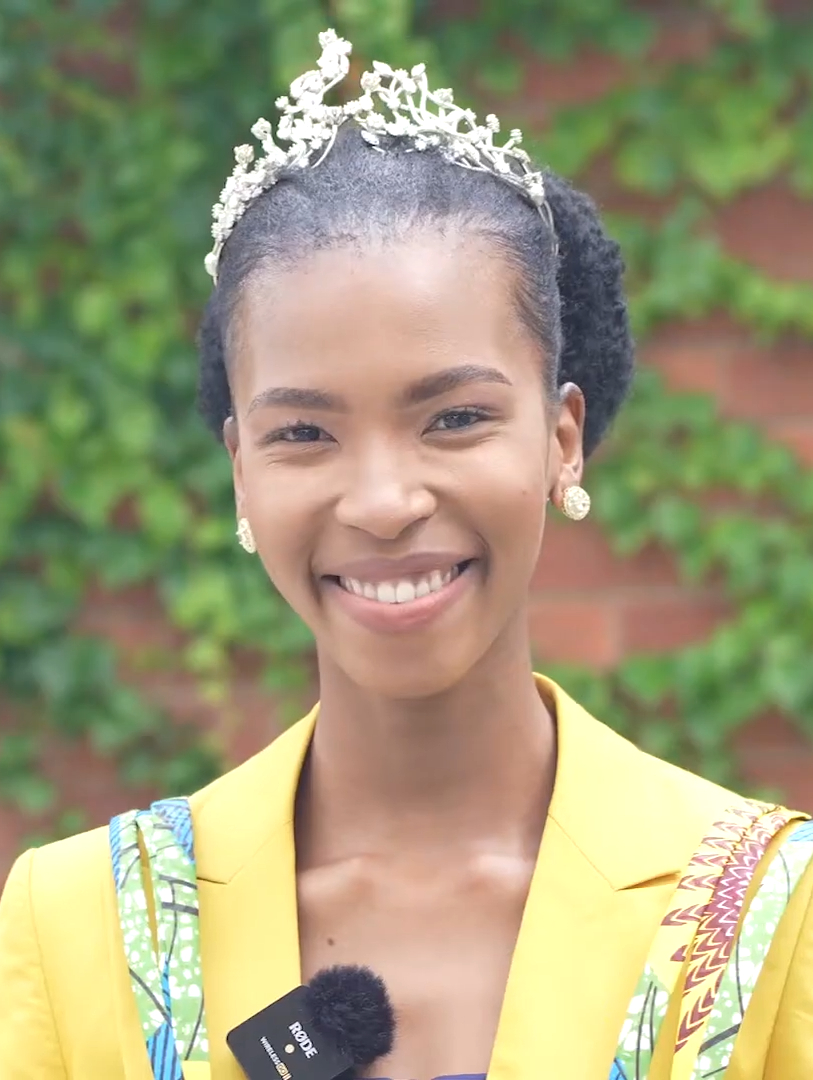
- Chombo in 2022

Minister of Youth and Gender Affairs of Botswana
- Incumbent
- Assumed office 11 November 2024
- Preceded by: Tumiso Rakgare (Youth, Gender, Sport and Culture)

Personal details
- Born: Shorobe, Botswana
- Citizenship: Botswana
- Parent(s): Othusitse Motswanageng Chombo and Ditebo Chombo
- Education: University of Botswana

Lesego Chombo is a Motswana politician, and former beauty pageant titleholder. She has served as Botswana's Minister of Youth and Gender Affairs since November 2024, and is the youngest person to hold a ministerial post in the country's national assembly.

Before entering formal politics, Chombo practiced law and competed in beauty pageants. She won Miss Botswana 2022 and represented Botswana at Miss World 2023, reaching the top four and won the title of Miss World Africa.

== Early life and education ==
Lesego Chombo was born in Shorobe, North-West District, Botswana. She holds a law degree from the University of Botswana. She practiced as an Attorney at Law for two years prior to competing in beauty pageants.

== Career ==
=== Legal profession ===
After completing her studies, Chombo began her legal career with an internship at Baliki Corporate Law. She later joined and become an associate at Kebabonye Business Law. In November 2024, President Duma Boko nominated her to the National Assembly, where she was subsequently appointed Minister for Youth and Gender Affairs.

=== Pageantry ===
Chombo won her first beauty pageant, the Queen Esther in 2012, and Miss Women Empowerment in 2017. In 2022, she won Miss Botswana, and in 2024 Miss World Africa.

=== Political career ===
Lesego was inducted to the National Assembly of Botswana as a specially elected MP. (Note: According to the Government of Botswana, specially elected MPs are chosen by leaders of political parties represented in Parliament to ensure broader representation.) on 7 November 2024. Her appointment to the position of Minister of Youth and Gender Affairs was announced by President Duma Boko on 11 November 2024; she became the youngest person to hold ministerial office, at age 26.
