= Miss World 2023 =

71st edition of beauty pageant

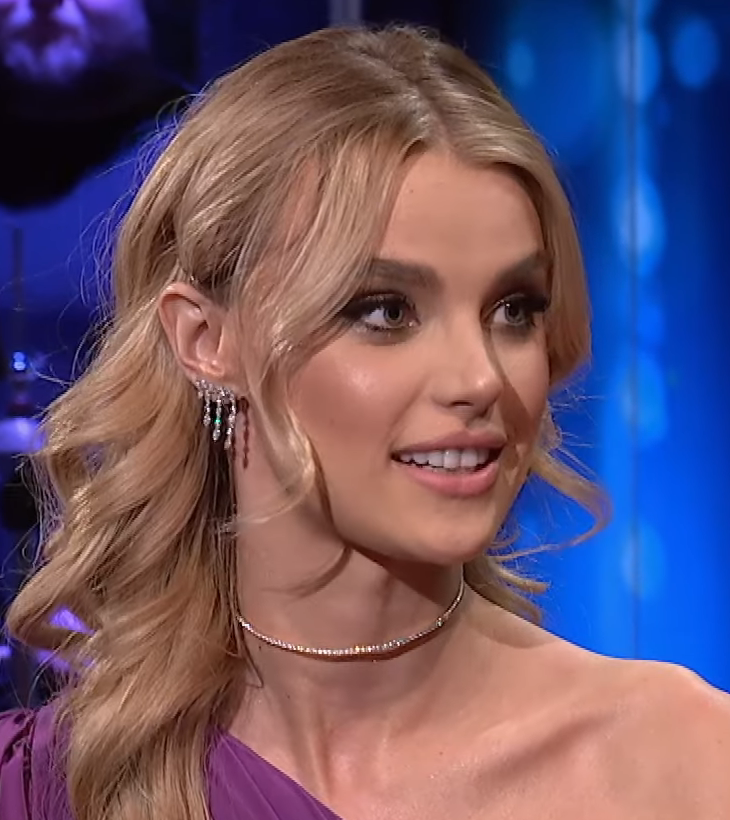
- Krystyna Pyszková
- Date: 9 March 2024
- Presenters: Karan Johar; Megan Young
- Entertainment: Shaan; Neha Kakkar; Tony Kakkar; Toni-Ann Singh
- Venue: Jio World Convention Centre, Mumbai, Maharashtra, India
- Broadcaster: London Live; Zee TV; SonyLIV
- Entrants: 112
- Placements: 40
- Debuts: Togo
- Withdrawals: Albania; Armenia; Bahamas; Equatorial Guinea; Iceland; Luxembourg; Rwanda; Saint Lucia; Sint Maarten
- Returns: Australia; Bangladesh; Croatia; Denmark; Ethiopia; Germany; Greece; Guatemala; Guyana; Kazakhstan; Lebanon; Lesotho; Liberia; Martinique; Montenegro; Morocco; Myanmar; New Zealand; Romania; Sierra Leone; South Sudan; Thailand; Zimbabwe
- Winner: Krystyna Pyszková; Czech Republic

Miss World 2023 was the 71st edition of the Miss World pageant, held at the Jio World Convention Centre in Mumbai, Maharashtra, India, on 9 March 2024.

At the end of the event, Krystyna Pyszková of the Czech Republic was crowned by the previous winner Karolina Bielawska of Poland. This is the first victory of the Czech Republic after 17 years, and it's overall second victory in the pageant. Runner-Up was Yasmina Zaytoun of Lebanon.

Contestants from 112 countries and territories competed in the pageant. The pageant was co-hosted by Karan Johar and Miss World 2013, Megan Young. Shaan, Neha Kakkar, Tony Kakkar, and Miss World 2019 Toni-Ann Singh performed in this edition.

== Background ==
=== Location and date ===
On 13 February 2023, Julia Morley, Chairperson of the Miss World Organization, announced that the competition will take place in the United Arab Emirates in May 2023. Morley added, "Further details to follow".

On 8 June 2023, the organization announced that the competition will move from the United Arab Emirates to India, with no reason given for the venue change. It was the second time the pageant was held in India; the first being Miss World 1996. On 28 September 2023, the organization announced that the pageant would be held on 16 December 2023 at Yashobhoomi, Dwarka, Delhi, India. It was later postponed until 2 March 2024, due to the elections in India.

On 19 January 2024, the organization announced the pageant would be held on 9 March 2024 at the Jio World Convention Centre in Mumbai. The pageant began on 18 February 2024.

=== Selection of participants ===
Contestants from 112 countries and territories were selected to compete in the pageant. Four of them are runners-up after the withdrawal of the original contestant in their respective countries and territories, and three selected after another national pageant was held to replace the original dethroned winner.

==== Replacements ====
Sreypich Teng was announced as Miss World Cambodia and competed instead of Sovattey Sary due to the delay of the pageant. Poelano Mothisi, the first runner-up in Miss Lesotho 2021, was appointed to represent her country as the original winner Refiloe Lefothane was unavailable due to continuing her studies abroad. Daria Gapska, Miss Northern Ireland was replaced by Kaitlyn Clarke, the reigning titleholder, as her reign had elapsed. Lucía Arellano was crowned as the new Miss World Peru 2022, replacing Jennifer Barrantes who was dethroned for not fulfilling the obligations stipulated in her contract. Barrantes has denied these claims and stated that there has been a conflict between her and the organization which has caused her withdrawal. Lucy Thomson, Miss Scotland 2022, was replaced by Chelsie Allison as her reign had elapsed.

Yue Ruan, Miss China World 2022, was stripped of her title for "inappropriate" behavior, and was replaced by Zewen Qin. Qin was also stripped of the title for falsifying her education and employment qualifications. China held an extra pageant to determine a new representative, with Kexin Xu as the new winner.

Miss Thailand 2023 Chonnikarn Supittayaporn was supposed to compete, but she was replaced by Miss Thailand World 2023, Tharina Botes due to national license issues.

==== Debuts, returns and withdrawals ====
This edition marked the debut of Togo, and the returns of Australia, Bangladesh, Croatia, Denmark, Ethiopia, Germany, Greece, Guatemala, Guyana, Kazakhstan, Lebanon, Lesotho, Liberia, Martinique, Montenegro, Morocco, Myanmar, New Zealand, Romania, Sierra Leone, South Sudan, Thailand, and Zimbabwe.

Morocco, which last competed in 1968; Liberia and Romania in 2017; Germany, Lebanon, Lesotho, Martinique, and Zimbabwe in 2018; and Australia, Bangladesh, Croatia, Denmark, Ethiopia, Greece, Guatemala, Guyana, Kazakhstan, Montenegro, Myanmar, New Zealand, Sierra Leone, South Sudan and Thailand last competed in 2019.

Albania, Armenia, the Bahamas, Equatorial Guinea, Iceland, Luxembourg, Rwanda, Saint Lucia, and Sint Maarten withdrew. Léa Sevenig of Luxembourg confirmed that she will no longer compete due to the cancellation of her national pageant. Divine Muheto of Rwanda also withdrew due to the cancellation of her national pageant following several allegations of misconduct from the organization towards the contestants. Ashley Carrington of Barbados, Xaria Penn of the British Virgin Islands, and Phonevilai Luanglath of Laos withdrew for undisclosed reasons.

== Results ==
=== Placements ===
Placement	Contestant
Miss World 2023	Czech Republic – Krystyna Pyszková
Runner-Up	Lebanon – Yasmina Zaytoun
Top 4	Botswana – Lesego Chombo; Trinidad and Tobago – Aché Abrahams
Top 8	Brazil – Leticía Frota; England – Jessica Gagen; India – Sini Shetty; Uganda – Hannah Tumukunde
Top 12	Australia – Kristen Wright; Dominican Republic – María Victoria Bayo; Mauritius – Liza Gundowry; Spain – Paula Pérez
Top 40	Belgium – Kedist Deltour; Belize – Elise-Gayonne Vernon; Cameroon – Julia Samantha Edima; Canada – Jaime VandenBerg; Croatia – Lucija Begić; France – Clémence Botino; Gibraltar – Faith Torres; Indonesia – Audrey Vanessa Susilo; Italy – Rebecca Arnone; Kenya – Chantou Kwamboka; Madagascar – Antsaly Rajoelina; Malaysia – Wenanita Angang; Martinique – Axelle René; Nepal – Priyanka Rani Joshi; New Zealand – Navjot Kaur; Nigeria – Ada Eme; Peru – Lucía Arellano; Puerto Rico – Elena Rivera; Somalia – Bahja Mohamoud; South Africa – Claude Mashego; South Sudan – Arek Abraham Albino; Tanzania – Halima Kopwe; Tunisia – Imen Mehrzi; Turkey – Nursena Say; Ukraine – Sofia Shamia; Vietnam – Mai Phương Huỳnh Nguyễn; Wales – Darcey Corria; Zimbabwe – Nokutenda Marumbwa

§ – Multimedia Challenge winner

=== Continental Queens of Beauty ===
The Continental titles were given to delegates who placed highest in the final, aside from the main crown.

Continent/Region	Contestant
Americas	Brazil – Leticía Frota
Caribbean	Trinidad and Tobago – Aché Abrahams
Africa	Botswana – Lesego Chombo
Europe	England – Jessica Gagen
Asia	Lebanon – Yasmina Zaytoun
Oceania	Australia – Kristen Wright

== Challenge events ==
=== Head-to-head challenge ===
Instead of competing in groups, the contestants created a video highlighting a specific G20 topic. Twenty-five of the contestants were selected to compete in the final round at The Summit Room in Bharat Mandapam, New Delhi on 23 February 2024, from whom five winners were selected. These five winners were automatically part of the Top 40.

- Advanced to the Top 40 via Head-to-Head challenge.

Placement	Contestant
Winners	Botswana – Lesego Chombo; England – Jessica Gagen; Lebanon – Yasmina Zaytoun; Nigeria – Ada Eme; Zimbabwe – Nokutenda Marumbwa
Top 25	Australia – Kristen Wright; Belgium – Kedist Deltour; Brazil – Leticía Frota; India – Sini Shetty; Indonesia – Audrey Vanessa Susilo; Ireland – Ivanna McMahon; Kenya – Chantou Kwamboka; Madagascar – Antsaly Rajoelina; Malaysia – Wenanita Angang; Nepal – Priyanka Rani Joshi; Northern Ireland – Kaitlyn Clarke; Philippines – Gwendolyne Fourniol; Puerto Rico – Elena Rivera; South Africa – Claude Mashego; Spain – Paula Pérez; Thailand – Tharina Botes; Trinidad and Tobago – Aché Abrahams; United States – Victoria DiSorbo; Vietnam – Mai Phương Huỳnh Nguyễn; Wales – Darcey Corria

=== Sports challenge ===
The Sports Challenge qualifier round was held on 22 February 2024 at the Thyagaraj Sports Complex, where the contestants competed in a beep test. On 23 February 2024, thirty-two contestants were announced to compete in the final round at the National Stadium, New Delhi on 24 February 2024. Lucija Begić from Croatia won the challenge, obtaining a placement in the Top 40, and the Blue Team from Europe won the overall competition.

- Advanced to the Top 40 via Sports challenge.

Placement	Contestant	Continent	Team
Winner	Croatia – Lucija Begić	Europe	Blue Team
2nd place	Chile – Ámbar Zenteno	Americas and Caribbean	Green Team
3rd place	Peru – Lucía Arellano	Americas and Caribbean	Green Team
Top 32 (Continental Qualifiers)	Botswana – Lesego Chombo; Ghana – Miriam Xorlasi; Kenya – Chantou Kwamboka; Madagascar – Antsaly Rajoelina; Morocco – Sonia Mansour; Namibia – Leoné van Jaarsveld; South Africa – Claude Mashego; South Sudan – Arek Abraham Albino	Africa	Yellow Team
Top 32 (Continental Qualifiers)	Canada – Jaime VandenBerg; Guadeloupe – Marie Hatchi; Guatemala – Marcela Miranda; Nicaragua – Mariela Cerros; Panama – Kathleen Pérez; Uruguay – Tatiana Luna	Americas and Caribbean	Green Team
Top 32 (Continental Qualifiers)	Australia – Kristen Wright; Indonesia – Audrey Vanessa Susilo; Japan – Kana Yamaguchi; Mongolia – Bolor Bat-Erdene; Nepal – Priyanka Rani Joshi; New Zealand – Navjot Kaur; Philippines – Gwendolyne Fourniol; South Korea – Lijin Kim	Asia and Oceania	Red Team
Top 32 (Continental Qualifiers)	Denmark – Johanne Hansen; England – Jessica Gagen; Greece – Samantha Misovic; Hungary – Boglárka Hacsi; Slovakia – Sophia Hrivňáková; Sweden – Stina Nordlander; Wales – Darcey Corria	Europe	Blue Team

=== Top Model challenge ===
The Top Model challenge was held on 2 March 2024 at the Aurika Mumbai SkyCity. The contestants catwalked in two outfits in continental groupings, before five finalists were selected from each continent group to advance. Amongst these five finalists, one continental winner was chosen. An overall winner and runner-up were then chosen amongst the four continental winners. Axelle René from Martinique was chosen as the winner, obtaining a spot in the Top 40. The winners of the Best Designer Dress were also announced at the same event.

- Advanced to the Top 40 via Top Model challenge.

Placement	Contestant	Continent
Winner	Martinique – Axelle René	Americas and Caribbean
Runner-up	Turkey – Nursena Say	Asia and Oceania
Finalists	Botswana – Lesego Chombo	Africa
Finalists	Slovakia – Sophia Hrivňáková	Europe
Top 20	Brazil – Leticía Frota; Canada – Jaime VandenBerg; Dominican Republic – María Victoria Bayo; Peru – Lucía Arellano	Americas and Caribbean
Top 20	Ghana – Miriam Xorlasi; Nigeria – Ada Eme; South Africa – Claude Mashego; Togo – Chimène Moladja	Africa
Top 20	India – Sini Shetty; Indonesia – Audrey Vanessa Susilo; Lebanon – Yasmina Zaytoun; Philippines – Gwendolyne Fourniol	Asia and Oceania
Top 20	Belgium – Kedist Deltour; Czech Republic – Krystyna Pyszková; France – Clémence Botino; Scotland – Chelsie Allison	Europe

==== Best Designer Dress ====
Placement	Contestant	Continent
Winners	Ethiopia – Rgat Afewerki Ybrah	Africa
Winners	United States – Victoria DiSorbo	Americas and Caribbean
Winners	India – Sini Shetty	Asia and Oceania
Winners	Czech Republic – Krystyna Pyszková	Europe

=== Talent challenge ===
The twenty-three finalists in the Talent Competition were announced via Miss World social media platforms on 1 March 2024. The final fourteen finalists showcased their talent during the 71st Beauty With a Purpose Gala Dinner on 3 March 2024. Imen Mehrzi from Tunisia won the challenge, obtaining a placement in the Top 40.

- Advanced to the Top 40 via Talent challenge.

Placement	Contestant
Winner	Tunisia – Imen Mehrzi
2nd place	Northern Ireland – Kaitlyn Clarke
3rd place	Indonesia – Audrey Vanessa Susilo
Top 14	Botswana – Lesego Chombo; Estonia – Adriana Mass; Gibraltar – Faith Torres; Guatemala – Marcela Miranda; Hungary – Boglárka Hacsi; India – Sini Shetty; Ireland – Ivanna McMahon; Mongolia – Bolor Bat-Erdene; Netherlands – Amber Koelewijn; Portugal – Catarina Ferreira; Wales – Darcey Corria
Top 23	Finland – Adelaide Botty van den Bruele; Malta – Natalia Galea; Philippines – Gwendolyne Fourniol; Poland – Krystyna Sokołowska; Puerto Rico – Elena Rivera; Romania – Ada-Maria Ileana; South Africa – Claude Mashego; Spain – Paula Pérez; Trinidad and Tobago – Aché Abrahams

=== Beauty With a Purpose ===
The ten finalists were announced live via Miss World's social media platforms during the 71st Beauty With a Purpose Gala Dinner on 3 March 2024. Four continental winners advanced to the Top 40.

- Advanced to the Top 40 via Beauty With a Purpose Challenge.

Placement	Contestant	Continent
Winner	Brazil – Leticía Frota	Americas and Caribbean
Top 4 (Continental Winners)	Uganda – Hannah Tumukunde	Africa
Top 4 (Continental Winners)	Nepal – Priyanka Rani Joshi	Asia and Oceania
Top 4 (Continental Winners)	Ukraine – Sofia Shamia	Europe
Top 10	Botswana – Lesego Chombo; Tanzania – Halima Kopwe	Africa
Top 10	Trinidad and Tobago – Aché Abrahams	Americas and Caribbean
Top 10	Indonesia – Audrey Vanessa Susilo; Turkey – Nursena Say	Asia and Oceania
Top 10	Czech Republic – Krystyna Pyszková	Europe

== Pageant ==
=== Selection committee ===
These included:

- Sajid Nadiadwala — Indian film producer
- Harbhajan Singh — Indian cricketer
- Rajat Sharma — Indian journalist
- Amruta Fadnavis — Indian actress and social worker
- Vineet Jain — Managing director of Bennett, Coleman & Co. Limited
- Julia Morley — Chairman and CEO of Miss World Organization
- Jamil Saidi — Host and strategic partner of Miss World India
- Kriti Sanon — Indian actress
- Pooja Hegde — Indian actress

== Contestants ==
112 contestants competed for the title.

Country/Territory	Contestant	Age (Note: Age at the time of the pageant)	Hometown	Continental Group
Angola	Florinda José	21	Luanda	Africa
Argentina	Mariela Fuchs	22	Misiones	Americas and Caribbean
Australia	Kristen Wright	24	Melbourne	Asia and Oceania
Bangladesh	Shammi Islam Nila	21	Dhaka	Asia and Oceania
Belgium	Kedist Deltour	26	Nazareth	Europe
Belize	Elise-Gayonne Vernon	21	Biscayne	Americas and Caribbean
Bolivia	Fernanda Rivero	20	Santa Cruz de la Sierra	Americas and Caribbean
Bosnia and Herzegovina	Anđela Gajić	18	Banja Luka	Europe
Botswana	Lesego Chombo	22	Gaborone	Africa
Brazil	Leticía Frota	20	Manaus	Americas and Caribbean
Bulgaria	Ivana Subeva	16	Sofia	Europe
Cambodia	Sreypich Teng	19	Banteay Meanchey	Asia and Oceania
Cameroon	Julia Samantha Edima	28	Ebolowa	Africa
Canada	Jaime VandenBerg	27	Coaldale	Americas and Caribbean
Cayman Islands	Leanni Tibbets	27	George Town	Americas and Caribbean
Chile	Ámbar Zenteno	28	Santiago	Americas and Caribbean
China	Kexin Xu	20	Heilongjiang	Asia and Oceania
Colombia	Camila Pinzón	28	Duitama	Americas and Caribbean
Costa Rica	Krisly Salas	24	Alajuela	Americas and Caribbean
Croatia	Lucija Begić	23	Zagreb	Europe
Curaçao	Nashaira Balentien	26	Willemstad	Americas and Caribbean
Czech Republic	Krystyna Pyszková	25	Třinec	Europe
Denmark	Johanne Hansen	22	Næstved	Europe
Dominican Republic	María Victoria Bayo	23	Santo Domingo	Americas and Caribbean
Ecuador	Annie Zámbrano	24	Salinas	Americas and Caribbean
El Salvador	Andrea Aguilar	20	San Salvador	Americas and Caribbean
England	Jessica Gagen	27	Skelmersdale	Europe
Estonia	Adriana Mass	21	Pärnu	Europe
Ethiopia	Rgat Afewerki Ybrah	23	Addis Ababa	Africa
Finland	Adelaide Botty van den Bruele	27	Sonkajärvi	Europe
France	Clémence Botino	27	Baie-Mahault	Europe
Germany	Aleksandra Modić	24	Wetzlar	Europe
Ghana	Miriam Xorlasi	23	Battor	Africa
Gibraltar	Faith Torres	22	Gibraltar	Europe
Greece	Samantha Misovic	19	Chania	Europe
Guadeloupe	Marie Hatchi	27	Basse-Terre	Americas and Caribbean
Guatemala	Marcela Miranda	20	Guatemala City	Americas and Caribbean
Guinea	Makia Bamba	25	Conakry	Africa
Guinea-Bissau	Mirla Ferreira Dabó	27	Bissau	Africa
Guyana	Andrea King	26	Georgetown	Americas and Caribbean
Ivory Coast	Mylene Djihony	23	Aboisso	Africa
Haiti	Valierie Alcide	28	Pétion-Ville	Americas and Caribbean
Honduras	Yelsin Almendarez	23	Danlí	Americas and Caribbean
Hungary	Boglárka Hacsi	23	Miskolc	Europe
India	Sini Shetty	22	Udupi	Asia and Oceania
Indonesia	Audrey Vanessa Susilo	24	Manado	Asia and Oceania
Iraq	Balsam Hussein	27	Baghdad	Asia and Oceania
(Republic of Ireland) Ireland	Ivanna McMahon	28	Barefield	Europe
Italy	Rebecca Arnone	21	Turin	Europe
Jamaica	Shanique Singh	26	Kingston	Americas and Caribbean
Japan	Kana Yamaguchi	25	Toyama	Asia and Oceania
Kazakhstan	Tomiris Kakimova	25	Astana	Asia and Oceania
Kenya	Chantou Kwamboka	24	Kisumu	Africa
Lebanon	Yasmina Zaytoun	21	Kfarchouba	Asia and Oceania
Lesotho	Poelano Mothisi	23	Maseru	Africa
Liberia	Veralyn Vonleh	20	Monrovia	Africa
Macau	Mengli Li	25	Macau	Asia and Oceania
Madagascar	Antsaly Rajoelina	23	Analamanga	Africa
Malaysia	Wenanita Angang	27	Kota Kinabalu	Asia and Oceania
Malta	Natalia Galea	24	Valletta	Europe
Martinique	Axelle René	22	Le Robert	Americas and Caribbean
Mauritius	Liza Gundowry	25	Port Louis	Africa
Mexico	Alejandra Díaz	25	San Luis Potosí	Americas and Caribbean
Moldova	Diana Spotarenko	20	Gagauzia	Europe
Mongolia	Bolor Bat-Erdene	24	Ulaanbaatar	Asia and Oceania
Montenegro	Anđela Vukadinović	22	Kotor	Europe
Morocco	Sonia Mansour	27	Marrakesh	Africa
Myanmar	Yoon Theint Theint Nway	19	Pindaya	Asia and Oceania
Namibia	Leoné van Jaarsveld	27	Swakopmund	Africa
Nepal	Priyanka Rani Joshi	25	Kathmandu	Asia and Oceania
Netherlands	Amber Koelewijn	18	Bunschoten	Europe
New Zealand	Navjot Kaur	27	Auckland	Asia and Oceania
Nicaragua	Mariela Cerros	25	Ocotal	Americas and Caribbean
Nigeria	Ada Eme	24	Abiriba	Africa
Northern Ireland	Kaitlyn Clarke	27	Belfast	Europe
Norway	Andrea Farias	20	Kristiansand	Europe
Panama	Kathleen Pérez	24	Changuinola	Americas and Caribbean
Paraguay	Dahiana Benítez	20	Encarnación	Americas and Caribbean
Peru	Lucía Arellano	23	Ucayali	Americas and Caribbean
Philippines	Gwendolyne Fourniol	23	Himamaylan	Asia and Oceania
Poland	Krystyna Sokołowska	25	Białystok	Europe
Portugal	Catarina Ferreira	25	Lisbon	Europe
Puerto Rico	Elena Rivera	19	Toa Baja	Americas and Caribbean
Romania	Ada-Maria Ileana	26	Bucharest	Europe
Scotland	Chelsie Allison	26	Inverness	Europe
Senegal	Fatou Lô	21	Dakar	Africa
Serbia	Anja Radić	20	Belgrade	Europe
Sierra Leone	Daisy Abdulai	22	Freetown	Africa
Singapore	Weiqi Oh	24	Singapore	Asia and Oceania
Slovakia	Sophia Hrivňáková	22	Banská Štiavnica	Europe
Slovenia	Vida Milivojša	24	Ljubljana	Europe
Somalia	Bahja Mohamoud	22	Beledweyne	Africa
South Africa	Claude Mashego	24	Bushbuckridge	Africa
South Korea	Lijin Kim	23	Seoul	Asia and Oceania
South Sudan	Arek Abraham Albino	21	Juba	Africa
Spain	Paula Pérez	27	Castellón	Europe
Sri Lanka	Kavindi Nethmini	27	Colombo	Asia and Oceania
Sweden	Stina Nordlander	26	Kramfors	Europe
Tanzania	Halima Kopwe	23	Mtwara	Africa
Thailand	Tharina Botes	27	Phuket	Asia and Oceania
Togo	Chimène Moladja	24	Lomé	Africa
Trinidad and Tobago	Aché Abrahams	24	Santa Cruz	Americas and Caribbean
Tunisia	Imen Mehrzi	28	Tunis	Africa
Turkey	Nursena Say	25	Istanbul	Asia and Oceania
Uganda	Hannah Tumukunde	20	Nakaseke	Africa
Ukraine	Sofia Shamia	19	Kyiv	Europe
United States	Victoria DiSorbo	25	Pembroke Pines	Americas and Caribbean
Uruguay	Tatiana Luna	23	Montevideo	Americas and Caribbean
Venezuela	Ariagny Daboín	27	Maracay	Americas and Caribbean
Vietnam	Mai Phương Huỳnh Nguyễn	24	Biên Hòa	Asia and Oceania
Wales	Darcey Corria	21	Barry	Europe
Zimbabwe	Nokutenda Marumbwa	20	Bulawayo	Africa
