= Barefield =

Village in County Clare, Ireland

Barefield Gort Lomán
- Village
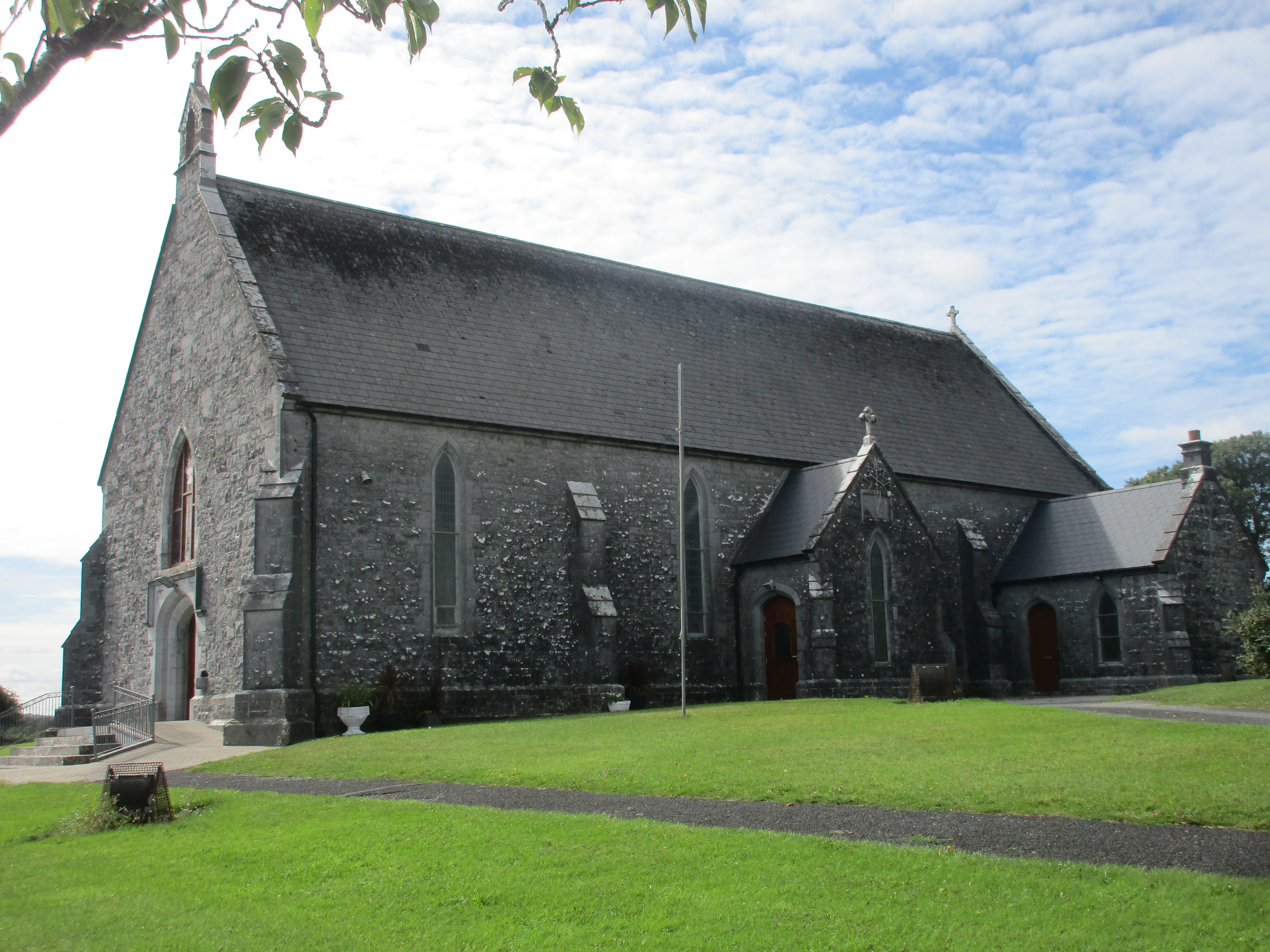
- Church of the Immaculate Conception

- Location in Ireland
- Coordinates: 52°53′16.24″N 8°56′54.67″W
- Country: Ireland
- County: County Clare
- Time zone: UTC+0 (WET)
  - Summer (DST): UTC-1 (IST (WEST))

Barefield or Gortlumman (Irish: Gort Lomán) is a village and townland in County Clare, Ireland. It is located on the R458 road, with the M18 national primary road between Ennis and Gort skirting it.

Barefield is in the Catholic parish of Doora-Barefield parish. The village itself consists of The Church of the Immaculate Conception, Barefield National School, two shops and two pubs. Access to Barefield has changed in 2007 with the opening of the Ennis Bypass and changed again in 2010 upon the completion of the Gort Bypass.

== People ==
- Hylda Queally (b. 1961) Hollywood talent agent.

== See also ==
- List of towns and villages in Ireland
