= Leticía Frota =

Brazilian beauty pageant titleholder

- Born: Letícia Frota; Manaus, Amazonas, Brazil
- Beauty pageant titleholder
- Title: Miss Brazil World 2022; Miss World Americas 2023
- Major competitions: Miss Brazil World 2022 (Winner); Miss World 2023 (Top 8); (Miss World Americas)

Leticía Frota is a Brazilian beauty pageant titleholder, who won Miss Brazil World 2022 and represented Brazil at Miss World 2023 in Mumbai, Maharashtra, India, where she reached the top eight. She also won the Beauty with a Purpose award, and was named Miss World Americas 2023.

In 2026, Frota was officially appointed as the new Beauty with a Purpose Coordinator of Miss Brazil World.

== Early life and education ==
Letícia Frota was born and raised in Manaus, Amazonas, Brazil. She studied psychology.

== Pageantry ==
On 4 August 2022, Frota represented the state of Amazonas and won Miss Brazil World 2022, held at the CAESB Theatre in Aguas Claras alongside thirty-five other contestants. She was crowned by the outgoing titleholder, Caroline Teixeira. She the first woman from Amazonas to win title. As Miss Brazil World 2022, Frota represented her country at Miss World 2023 in India, on 9 March 2024, at the Jio World Convention Centre in Mumbai. During the fast-track events, Frota reached the top 25 in the Head-to-Head Challenge, the top 20 in the Top Model challenge, and won Beauty with a Purpose award in the Americas and Caribbean continental group. She won the overall Beauty with a Purpose award, and reached the top eight of the contest. Frota also received the Miss World Americas continental title.

== Advocacy ==
Leticía Frota serves as a representative for Hansen's Disease awareness both nationally and internationally. She has participated in global forums in India and the Vatican, that included an audience with Pope Francis. Her work focuses on public education about the condition, leading her to visit historical treatment communities across Brazil. Furthermore, she has contributed her time to voluntary projects in South Africa, Zimbabwe, and the Amazon. Through these efforts, she has secured funding to deliver vital supplies like food and clean water to vulnerable populations.

Awards and achievements
Preceded by USA Shree Saini, US	Miss World Americas; 2023	Succeeded by BRA Jéssica Pedroso, Brasil
Preceded by Caroline Teixeira	Miss Brazil World; 2022	Succeeded by Jéssica Pedroso
