= Namrata Shrestha (model) =

Miss Nepal 2020

- Born: c. 1997; Kathmandu, Nepal
- Beauty pageant titleholder
- Title: Miss Nepal 2020
- Major competitions: Miss Nepal 2020 (Winner); Miss World 2021 (Top 40)

Namrata Shrestha is a Nepalese beauty pageant titleholder who won Miss Nepal 2020 and represented Nepal at Miss World 2021, where she reached the top 40.

== Early life and education ==
Shrestha was born and raised in Kathmandu. She studied sociology and worked as a kindergarten teacher.

== Pageantry ==
=== Miss Nepal 2016 ===
Shrestha entered the Miss Nepal 2016 pageant and placed in the top five.

=== Miss Nepal 2020 ===
Shrestha was crowned the winner of the Miss Nepal 2020 pageant,and was also awarded the Miss Confident and Miss Intellectual titles.

=== Miss World 2021 ===
Shrestha represented Nepal at the Miss World 2021 pageant. She placed in the top 40. She placed in the top 10 in the Multimedia Challenge and Beauty with a Purpose award.

Awards and achievements
Preceded by Anushka Shrestha (Nepal)	Miss Nepal World; 2020	Succeeded by Priyanka Rani Joshi (Nepal)
