= Miss Armenia =

Beauty pageant

Miss Armenia Միսս Հայաստան
- Formation: 1996; 30 years ago
- Type: Beauty pageant
- Headquarters: Yerevan
- Location: Armenia
- Members: Miss Universe; Miss Grand International; Miss Cosmo
- Official language: Armenian
- President: Gohar Harutunyan (2017―2022); Yuliia Pavlikova (Separated contest, Miss Universe Armenia in 2024); Edgar Saakyan (2025―present)
- Parent organization: Edgar Entertainment
- Website: https://missuniversearmenia.com/

Miss Armenia (Armenian: Միսս Հայաստան; Miss Hayastan) is a national beauty pageant in Armenia. Established in 1996, the competition was linked to the country's participation in Miss Europe, where Armenian representatives achieved results such as Lusine Tovmasyan's first runner-up finish in 2005 and several semifinalist placements.

Since its inception, the pageant has faced numerous periods of inactivity, budgetary constraints, and organizational disputes over branding and management rights. Following a four-year hiatus, the competition was revived in 2017 under the direction of Gohar Harutyunyan (Miss Armenia 1998), and that same year Armenia made its debut at Miss World. However, after a trademark dispute, Harutyunyan established an independent selection process that oversaw Armenia's debut at Miss Universe. Meanwhile, the pageant's previous organizers reclaimed the Miss Armenia franchise in 2019 and hosted its most recent edition in 2025.

== History ==
The Miss Armenia pageant was established in 1996 after its promoters, Ara Yernjakyan, artistic director of the Yerevan Chamber Theatre, and Ruben Toroyan, abandoned an international project known as Miss Armenia of the World (Միսս աշխարհի հայուհի) for financial reasons. The original proposal aimed to coordinate local pageants within Armenian communities in forty-eight countries and select an overall winner from among their contestants. During the planning stage, Toroyan travelled to Moscow to assist with preparations for Miss Russia. At the time, the Russian pageant's president, Nikolay Kostin, introduced the Armenian organizers to Roger Zeiler, president of Miss Europe, who arranged the invitation that enabled Armenia to make its debut in the continental competition.

Yernjakyan chaired the organizing committee, which operated through the Yerevan Chamber Theatre, until 2000. Before the 2001 edition, the government restructured the pageant's administration and transferred its management to the newly established Miss Armenia National Agency, headed by Karen Aristakesyan, then Deputy Minister of Culture, Youth and Sport. The transfer prompted a public dispute in which the theatre's founders alleged that their rights had been transferred improperly. According to Yernjakyan, Aristakesyan justified the decision by saying, "I'll do it better." Several months later, however, reports indicated that the artistic director had decided against pursuing legal action. Aristakesyan rejected the allegations of intellectual property infringement, arguing that, under the civil code then in force, the pageant itself was not eligible for copyright protection, although its script could be protected. He also cited earlier complaints arising from the absence of formal contracts with contestants. In addition, he accused Yernjakyan of failing to meet documentation requirements by registering the event in the theatre's name, which he said violated "international organizing standards". Nevertheless, the deputy minister stated that he did not intend to initiate legal proceedings.

In the following years, the pageant was held intermittently because of budgetary constraints. Several editions were cancelled, particularly between 2008 and 2011. Plans for another edition were abandoned in 2013, when the national agency's leadership attributed the cancellation to "logistical and financial complexities". The competition remained inactive until May 2017, when its revival was announced. The revived pageant was organized under the leadership of Gohar Harutyunyan, Miss Armenia 1998, and the Pan-Armenian Miss Armenia Foundation. The initiative received support from the ministries responsible for culture and diaspora affairs, as well as the national tourism agency. For the first time, the project included contestants from Armenian communities abroad. The finale was held in September 2017, and the winner, Lili Sargsyan, earned the right to represent Armenia at Miss World 2017, marking the country's debut at the international competition.

From 2018 onwards, Harutyunyan no longer organized the national pageant under the traditional Miss Armenia name. Instead, she organized the Miss Hayuhi (Note: The Armenian term Հայուհի (Hayuhi) means "Armenian woman" or "Armenian girl." It is composed of the root Hay (Armenian) and the suffix -uhi, which is used to denote the feminine gender.) pageant and subsequently other competitions under different names, specifically designed to select Armenia's representatives at Miss World and Miss Universe. This separate organizational model remained in place during the early and mid-2020s. Meanwhile, the Miss Armenia National Agency, under the continued leadership of Mamikon Danielyan, resumed organizing Miss Armenia in 2019. The 2020 edition was cancelled because of the COVID-19 pandemic and the Second Nagorno-Karabakh War. Danielyan resumed the competition in 2021, after which it became inactive again. The hiatus ended in June 2025, when the most recent edition was held.

== Titleholders ==
Color key

- Declared as Winner
- Ended as runner-up
- Ended as one of the finalists or semifinalists

=== 1996—2017 ===
Year	Miss Armenia	Armenian Name	Region	Notes	International
1996	Karine Khachatrian	Կարինե Խաչատրյան	Yerevan	Armenian sport master in artistic gymnastics	Miss Europe 1996 (13th)
1997	Angelina Babajanyan	Անգելինա Բաբաջանյան	Yerevan	Miss Caucasus	—
1998	Gohar Harutyunyan	Գոհար Հարությունյան	Yerevan	CEO of Miss Armenian org. — Franchise holder to Miss Universe and Miss World in Armenia	Mrs Globe 2009; Miss Commonwealth of CIS 1998
2000	Kristina Babayan	Քրիստինա Բաբայան	Yerevan	Doctor-cosmetologist	—
2001	Irina Tovmasyan	Իրինա Թովմասյան	Yerevan	—	—
2003	Lusine Tovmasyan	Լուսինե Թովմասյան	Yerevan	Vitsemiss Europe 2005	Miss Europe 2005 (1st Runner-up)
2006	Marina Vardanyan	Մարինա Վարդանյան	Yerevan	—	Miss Europe 2006 (Top 12)
2007	Margarita Sarukhanyan	Մարգարիտա Սարուխանյան	Yerevan	—	—
2008	Anna Galstyan	Աննա Գալստյան	Yerevan	—	—
2010	Lilit Karapetyan	Լիլիթ Կարապետյան	Yerevan	Miss Supranational Armenia 2010	—
2012	Anna Arakelyan	Աննա Առաքելյան	Yerevan	An Economist	—
2017	Lili Sargsyan	Լիլի Սարգսյան	Yerevan	Miss World Armenia 2017; Miss Grand Armenia 2019	—

=== 2018—Present ===
Began 2018 the Miss Armenian separated the franchise of Miss Universe and Miss World national contest in two selections. First, the Miss Universe Armenia will crown the winner earlier than Miss World Armenia in different date before coming to International pageants. The Miss World Armenia will be crowned the new title holder in the last ending of Miss Armenia section. Armenia debuts at Miss Universe in 2018 while in 2017 Armenia started to join at the Miss World in China. Later in 2021, the organization also acquired the license of the Miss Grand International for Armenia.

Year	Miss Universe Armenia		Notes	Miss World Armenia		Notes	Miss Grand Armenia		Notes
Year	Romanized name	Armenian Name	Notes	Romanized name	Armenian Name	Notes	Romanized name	Armenian Name	Notes
2018	Eliza Muradyan	Էլիզա Մուրադյան	Business Woman, Owner & CEO of Elysee™	Arena Zeynalyan	Արենա Զեյնալյան		Acquired the license in 2021		
2019	Dayana Davtyan	Դայանա Դավթյան	Architect — Miss Planet 2015 (Elegance award)	Liana Voskerchyan	Լիանա Ոսկերչյան		Acquired the license in 2021		
2020	Monika Grigoryan	Մոնիկա Գրիգորյան	Miss Tourism Globe Armenia 2019	No Titleholder, the international pageant was cancelled due to the COVID-19 pandemic.			Acquired the license in 2021		
2021	Nane Avetisyan	Նանե Ավետիսյան		Mirna Bzdigian	Միրնա Պզտիկեան	Armenian-Syrian	Kristina Ayanian	Քրիստինա Այանյան	Miss Boston 2020 (Armenian-American)
2022	Kristina Ayanian	Քրիստինա Այանյան	Miss Boston 2020 (Armenian-American)	No Titleholder					

Year	Miss World Armenia		Notes	Miss Cosmo Armenia		Notes	Miss Grand Armenia		Notes
Year	Romanized name	Armenian Name	Notes	Romanized name	Armenian Name	Notes	Romanized name	Armenian Name	Notes
2024	Adrine Achemyan	Ադրինե Աճեմյանը		Lilia Gzraryan	Լիլիա Գզրարյան		Haykanush Mkrtchyan	Հայկանուշ Մկրտչյանը	

Year	Miss Universe Armenia		Notes	Miss Grand Armenia		Notes
Year	Romanized name	Armenian Name	Notes	Romanized name	Armenian Name	Notes
2025	Peggy Garabekian	Փեգի Գարաբեկյան	Armenian-American	Lilia Gzraryan	Լիլիա Գզրարյան	
2026	Arena Zeynalian	Արենա Զեյնալյան		Amest Arutiunian	Ամեստ Հարությունյան	

=== 2024 ===
Began 2024 Yuliia Pavlikova, a Bulgarian businesswoman and former Miss Bulgaria 2023 took over a Miss Universe license for Armenia since the organization of Miss Armenian is no longer to hold Miss Universe and Miss World licenses. The pageant suspended since 2022, due to lack of sponsorships. The separation competition for the first time was happening in Moscow under Pavlikova.

Year	Miss Armenia	Armenian Name	Region	Notes
2024	Emma Avanesyan (Replaced)	Էմմա Ավանեսյան	Yerevan	Founder of Brilliant Partner (Law Firm) ― Irini did not go to Miss Universe due to citizenship approval by Miss Universe Organization. Her 3rd Runner-up, Emma Avanesyan replaced her and represented Armenia at Miss Universe 2024.
2024	Irina Zakharova (Did not compete)	Իրինա Զախարովա	Yerevan	Founder of Brilliant Partner (Law Firm) ― Irini did not go to Miss Universe due to citizenship approval by Miss Universe Organization. Her 3rd Runner-up, Emma Avanesyan replaced her and represented Armenia at Miss Universe 2024.

== Titleholders under Miss Armenia ==
- : Declared as Winner
- : Ended as runner-up or top 5/6 qualification
- : Ended as one of the finalists or semifinalists
- : Ended as special awards winner

The following women have represented Armenia in the international beauty pageants. The highest placement was the winner of Miss Commonwealth of CIS in 1998, won by Gohar Harutunyan

=== Miss Universe Armenia ===
Year	Region	Miss Universe Armenia	Armenian Name	Placement at Miss Universe	Special awards
Edgar Saakyan directorship — a franchise holder to Miss Universe since 2025
2026	Yerevan	Arena Zeynalian	Արենա Զեյնալյան	TBA	
2025	-	Peggy Garabekian	Փեգի Գարաբեկյան	Unplaced	
Yuliia Pavlikova directorship — a franchise holder to Miss Universe in 2024
2024	Yerevan	Emma Avanesyan	Էմմա Ավանեսյան	Unplaced	
2024	Yerevan	Irina Zakharova	Իրինա Զախարովա	Did not compete	
Gohar Harutunyan directorship — a franchise holder to Miss Universe between 2018―2022
Did not compete in 2023
2022	Yerevan	Kristina Ayanian	Քրիստինա Այանյան	Unplaced	
2021	Yerevan	Nane Avetisyan	Նանե Ավետիսյան	Unplaced	
2020	Yerevan	Monika Grigoryan	Մոնիկա Գրիգորյան	Unplaced	
2019	Yerevan	Dayana Davtyan	Դայանա Դավթյան	Unplaced	
2018	Etchmiadzin	Eliza Muradyan	Էլիզա Մուրադյան	Unplaced	

=== Miss World Armenia ===
Year	Region	Miss World Armenia	Armenian Name	Placement at Miss Universe	Special awards
Miss Yerevan Production directorship — a franchise holder to World since 2025
2026	Yerevan	Monika Harutjunjanova	Մոնիկա Հարությունյանովա	TBA	TBA
2025	Yerevan	Adrine Achemyan	Ադրինե Աճեմյանը	Unplaced	
2024	No competition held				
Gohar Harutunyan directorship — a franchise holder to Miss World between 2017―2021
2023	Did not compete				
2022	Miss World 2021 was rescheduled to 16 March 2022 due to the COVID-19 pandemic outbreak in Puerto Rico, no edition started in 2022				
2021	Yerevan	Mirna Bzdigian	Միրնա Պզտիկեան	Unplaced	Miss World Sport (Top 32)
Due to the impact of COVID-19 pandemic, no competition held in 2020
2019	Yerevan	Liana Voskerchyan	Լիանա Ոսկերչյան	Unplaced	Miss World Talent (Top 5)
2018	Yerevan	Arena Zeynalyan	Արենա Զեյնալյան	Unplaced	
2017	Yerevan	Lili Sargsyan	Լիլի Սարգսյան	Unplaced	

=== Miss Grand Armenia ===
Armenia made its debut at the Miss Grand International pageant in 2019 by Lili Sargsyan, Miss Armenia 2017 winner, under the direction of Janna Gregory. In 2021, Harutyunyan's Pan-Armenian Miss Armenia Foundation purchased the license for Miss Grand International, although no contest was held, Kristina Ayanian was appointed to represent the country at the pageant and became the second Armenian candidate to compete at the pageant.

Year	Region	Miss Grand Armenia	Armenian Name	Placement at Miss Grand International	Special awards
Edgar Saakyan directorship — a franchise holder to Miss Grand International since 2025
2026	Sisian	Amest Arutiunian	Ամեստ Հարությունյան	Unplaced	
2025	Yerevan	Lilia Gzraryan	Լիլիա Գզրարյան	Unplaced	
Miss Yerevan Production directorship — a franchise holder to Miss Grand International in 2024
2024	Yerevan	Haykanush Mkrtchyan	Հայկանուշ Մկրտչյանը	Unplaced	
Gohar Harutunyan directorship — a franchise holder to Miss Grand International between 2019―2021
Did not compete since 2022—2023; in 2024 the Armenian representative was designated by another organization. Mrs. Gohar did not extend the license.
2021	Yerevan	Kristina Ayanian	Քրիստինա Այանյան	Unplaced	Miss Grand Spirit Award
2020	Yerevan	Nare Zakaryan	Նարե Զաքարյան	Did not compete	
2019	Yerevan	Lili Sargsyan	Լիլի Սարգսյան	Unplaced	

=== Miss Grand All Stars Armenia ===
Year	Region	Miss Armenia	Armenian Name	Placement at Miss Cosmo	Special awards
Edgar Saakyan directorship — a franchise holder to Miss Grand All Stars since 2026
2026	Yerevan	Lilia Gzraryan	Լիլիա Գզրարյան		

=== Miss Armenia USA ===
Year	Region	Miss Armenia	Armenian Name	Notes
Under the leadership of Edgar Saakyan, founder of a beauty pageant platform for Armenian women in the United States
2026				
2025	Los Angeles, California	Sayda Hartoonian	Սայդա Հարությունյան	New York Fashion Week, Paris Fashion Week, Los Angeles Fashion Week

=== Miss Cosmo Armenia ===
Year	Region	Miss Armenia	Armenian Name	Placement at Miss Cosmo	Special awards
Edgar Saakyan directorship — a franchise holder to Miss Cosmo since 2024
2025	Did not compete				
2024	Yerevan	Lilia Gzraryan	Լիլիա Գզրարյան	Unplaced	

== Titleholder gallery ==
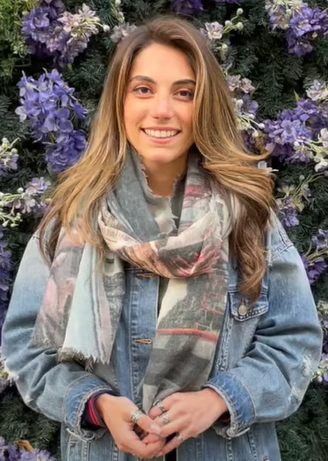
Kristina Ayanian
Representative to Miss Grand International 2021

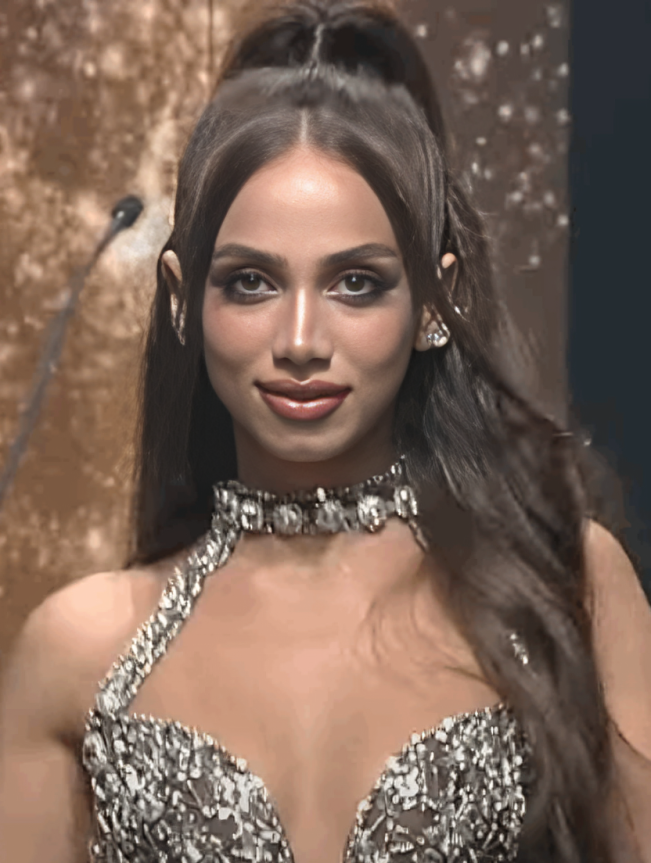
Haykanush Mkrtchyan
Representative to Miss Grand International 2024

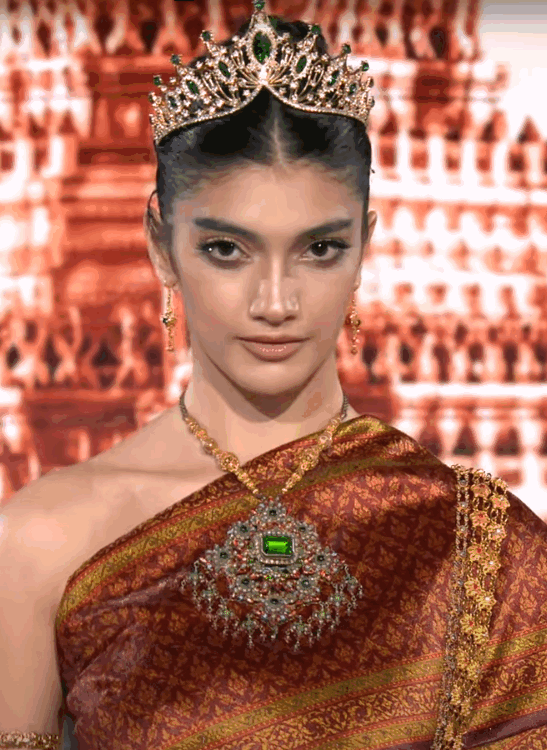
Lilia Gzraryan
Representative to Miss Grand International 2025
