= Lusine Tovmasyan =

Armenian beauty pageant contestant (born 1986)

- Born: July 25, 1986 (age 40); Yerevan, Armenian SSR, Soviet Union
- Relatives: Ira Tovmasyan (Miss Armenia 2001)
- Modelling information
- Height: 5 ft 9 in (1.75 m)
- Hair color: Brown
- Eye colour: Brown

Lusine Tovmasyan (Armenian: Լուսինե Թովմասյան; born July 25, 1986) is an Armenian model and beauty pageant titleholder who won Miss Armenia 2003.

== Biography ==
Tovmasyan was born to Armenian parents in Yerevan, where she spent her childhood. She was accepted to the University of Philology and became a student at the Russian-Armenian state university.

In August 2003, at the age of 17, Tovmasyan won the national Miss Armenia competition. She later represented the country at the Miss Europe 2005 pageant, where she finished as first runner-up behind Germany's Shermine Shahrivar, marking Armenia's highest position ever in Miss Europe.

=== Eurovision Song Contest ===
She was the Armenian spokesperson for the 2011 and 2025 editions.

== See also ==
- Miss Armenia
- Eurovision Song Contest
