= Iranians in Germany =

Iranian Germans ایرانیان آلمان
- Distribution of Iranian citizens in Germany (2021)

Total population
- ~ 272,000 (German citizens); 114,125 (Iranian citizens without German citizenship)

Regions with significant populations
- Hamburg, Berlin, Frankfurt am Main, Essen, Cologne, Düsseldorf, Bonn, Münster, Mainz, Hannover, Braunschweig

Languages
- German, Persian (Azerbaijani, Armenian, Kurdish, and other languages of Iran).

Religion
- Shia Islam, Christianity, Sunni Islam, Judaism, Baháʼí Faith, Zoroastrianism, Irreligion, Atheism, various others

Related ethnic groups
- Iranian diaspora (Iranians of UAE • Ajam of Bahrain • Ajam of Qatar • Ajam of Iraq • 'Ajam of Kuwait • Iranians of Canada • Iranians of America • Iranians of UK • Iranians of Germany • Iranians of Israel • Iranians in Turkey) Iranian Peoples (Lurs, Achomis, Baluchs, Kurds, Iranian Azeris), Turkic peoples (Qashqai, Azerbaijanis), Huwala

Iranians in Germany (German: Iraner in Deutschland) include immigrants from Iran to Germany as well as their descendants of Iranian heritage or background. Iranians in Germany are referred to by hyphenated terms such as Iranian-Germans or Persian-Germans. Similar terms Iranisch Deutsch and Persisches Deutsch, may be found in Germanophone media. In 2024, Federal Statistical Office of Germany (Destatis) estimates that 319,000 people of Iranian background live in Germany.

Iranians in Germany have taken a wide range of jobs, from fashion, arts and entertainment to engineering and medicine.

== Multiple Nationality ==
Nowadays, most Iranian-Germans have German and Iranian citizenship (multiple nationality). Iran almost never frees its citizens from their Iranian citizenship (see Article 989 Iran. Civil Code), which is inherited through the father (or descent). The still existing German-Iranian agreement of 1929 regulates in no. II of the Final Protocol that government approval is required prior to the naturalization of nationals of the other State.

== Demographics ==
Number of Iranians in larger cities
#	City	People
1.	Hamburg	9,873
2.	Berlin	9,039
3.	Cologne	4,760
4.	Munich	3,792
5.	Bonn	3,341
6.	Düsseldorf	2,962
7.	Frankfurt	2,884
8.	Hanover	2,543
9.	Bremen	2,460
10.	Essen	1,863

== By occupation data ==
=== Arts ===
A large number of Iranian artists are working in Germany, some of whom are internationally known. Some of these artists have left Iran for political reasons and some have started their professional activity in Germany.

In music, Navíd Akhavan, Sima Bina, Shirin David, Ramin Djawadi Daryush Shokof, and Shahin Najafi are examples of International success.

=== Fashion ===
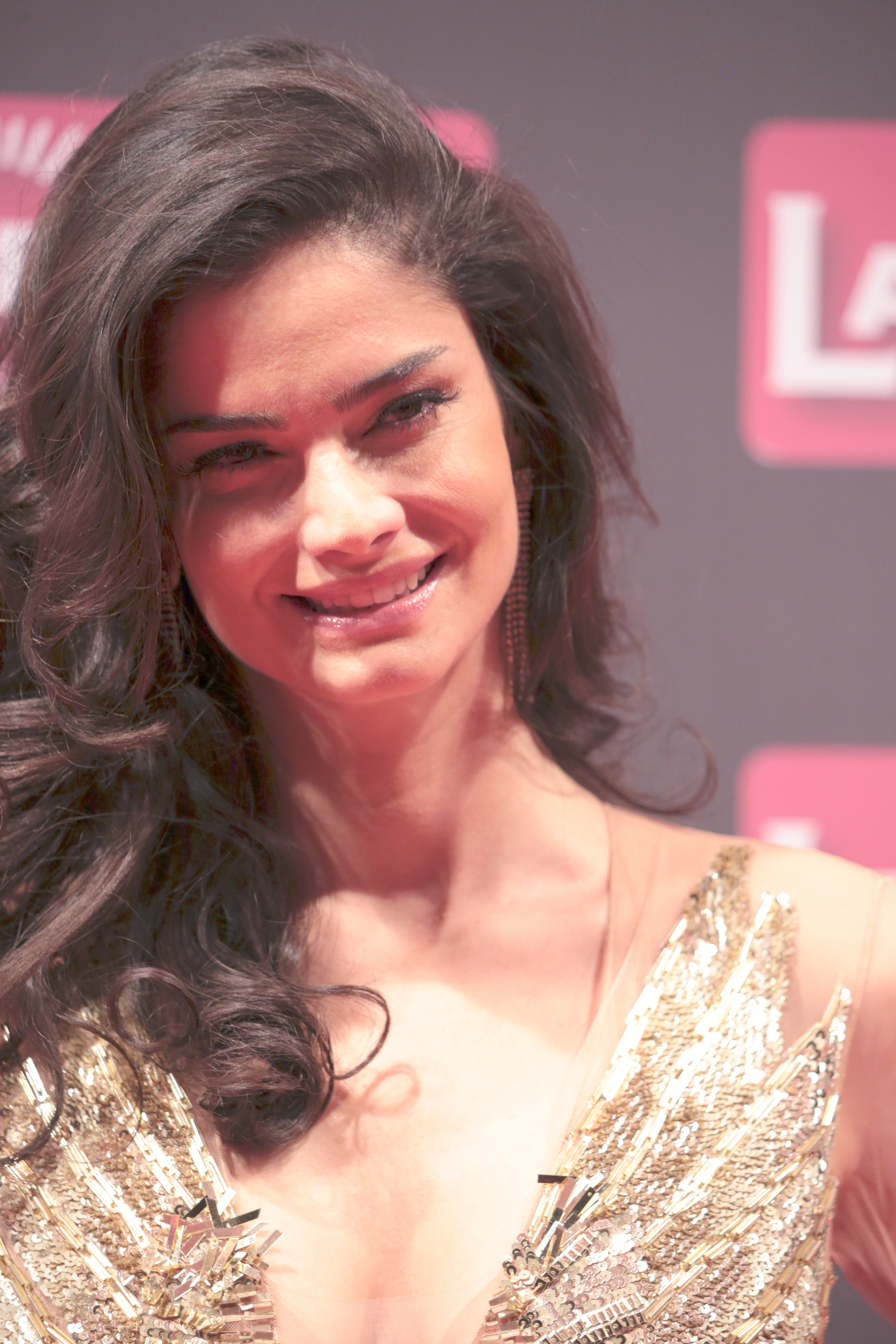
Shermine Shahrivar, beauty pageant titleholder.

Many Iranian women have achieved international success as fashion models in Germany. Shermine Shahrivar is one of this German models who is a beauty pageant titleholder and won Miss Europe 2005. Germany has been an attractive destination for Iranian female models since 1979.

=== Entertainment ===
Many Iranian-Germans work in the entertainment sector. Especially Iranian women who have not been able to work in Iran due to social, political or cultural reasons. Iranian-Germans like Daryush Shokof, Enissa Amani, Fereydoun Farrokhzad, Melika Foroutan, Melissa Khalaj, Narges Rashidi are examples of International success in the entertainment industry.

=== Politics ===
Although there are few Iranian-German politicians, they may have a high impact on the people inside Iran. They include Sahra Wagenknecht, Reza Asghari, Yasmin Fahimi, and Omid Nouripour.

=== Sports ===
Considering the status of football in Iran, a number of Persian-Germans became famous football players. Including Sara Doorsoun, Ashkan Dejagah, Daniel Davari, Alexander Nouri and Ferydoon Zandi.

=== Science/Academia ===
The migration of Iranian researchers to Germany has been investigated by the Iranian state media and called "alarming".

== See also ==
- Asians in Germany
- Iran-Germany relations
- Iranian diaspora
