= Carlos Queiroz =

Portuguese association football manager (born 1953)

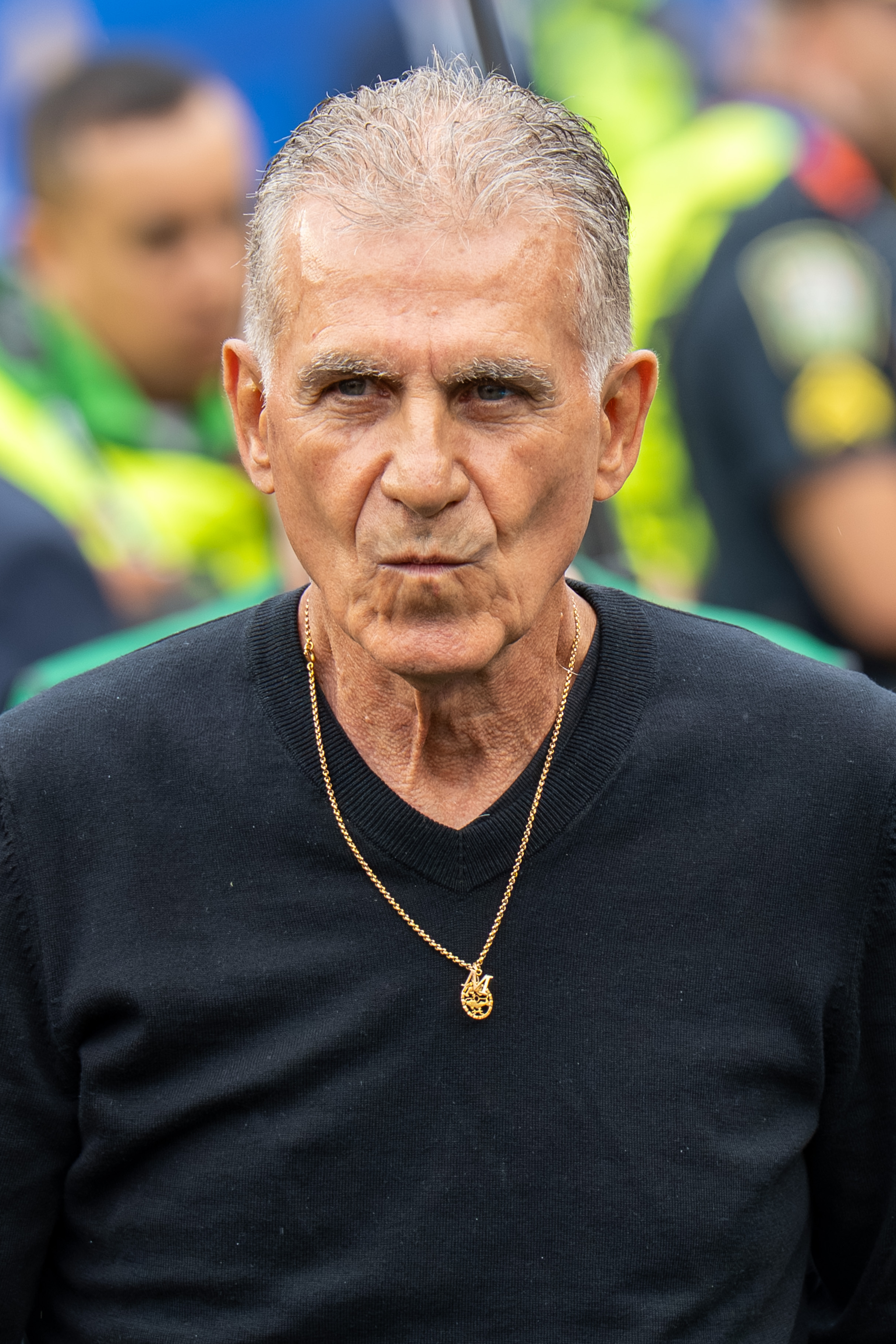
- Queiroz in 2026

Personal information
- Full name: Carlos Manuel Brito Leal de Queiroz
- Date of birth: 1 March 1953 (age 73)
- Place of birth: Angoche, Portuguese Mozambique
- Height: 1.83 m (6 ft 0 in)
- Position: Goalkeeper

Youth career
- Years: Team
- 1968–1974: Ferroviário de Nampula

Managerial career
- 1989–1991: Portugal U20
- 1991–1993: Portugal
- 1993–1996: Sporting CP
- 1996: NY/NJ MetroStars
- 1996–1997: Nagoya Grampus Eight
- 1998–1999: United Arab Emirates
- 2000–2002: South Africa
- 2002–2003: Manchester United (assistant)
- 2003–2004: Real Madrid
- 2004–2008: Manchester United (assistant)
- 2008–2010: Portugal
- 2011–2019: Iran
- 2019–2020: Colombia
- 2021–2022: Egypt
- 2022: Iran
- 2023: Qatar
- 2025–2026: Oman
- 2026: Ghana
Medal record
Men's football
Representing Portugal (as manager)
FIFA U-17 World Cup
| Bronze medal – third place | 1989 Scotland |
FIFA U-20 World Cup
| Winner | 1989 Saudi Arabia |
| Winner | 1991 Portugal |
Representing Egypt (as manager)
Africa Cup of Nations
| Runner-up | 2021 Cameroon |

Carlos Manuel Brito Leal de Queiroz (Note: Portuguese pronunciation: [ˈkaɾluʃ kɐjˈɾɔʃ]) ComIH (born 1 March 1953) is a Portuguese association football manager. He has served as the manager of the national teams of Portugal, the United Arab Emirates, South Africa, Iran, Colombia, Egypt, Qatar, Oman and Ghana, leading South Africa (2002), Portugal (2010), Iran (2014, 2018, 2022) and Ghana (2026) to the FIFA World Cup. At club level, he has managed Sporting CP, the New York/New Jersey Metrostars in Major League Soccer and Spanish club Real Madrid. He also had two spells as Alex Ferguson's assistant manager at English club Manchester United. In 1998, Queiroz authored the Q-Report, which detailed plans to enhance footballer development in the United States.

Queiroz is the longest-serving manager in the history of the Iran national team, serving for almost eight years between 2011 and 2019. He returned to the role for Iran's 2022 World Cup campaign. Queiroz is the only manager in the country's history to lead them at three consecutive World Cups.

== Career ==
Born in Angoche, Nampula, Portuguese Mozambique (Nampula Province was known as Moçambique at that time), to Portuguese parents, Queiroz had a professional career as an association football goalkeeper in Mozambique before turning to management. He moved to Portugal following Mozambique's declaration of independence in 1975. Queiroz is a graduate of the University of Lisbon. He coached the Portugal under-20 team to two FIFA World Youth Championship wins, in the 1989 and 1991 tournaments.

=== Early senior career ===
In 1984, Queiroz was appointed as assistant manager of Estoril-Praia. After that, Queiroz was appointed Portugal national team coach in 1991. He had a record of 14 wins in 31 matches. Afterwards, he went on to manage the Portuguese Primeira Divisão team Sporting CP in 1994.

He subsequently coached the NY/NJ MetroStars in the United States and the Japanese team, Nagoya Grampus Eight. In between, he found time to author the Q-Report, detailing plans to professionalize the development of footballers in the United States. Queiroz returned to coaching national teams in 1999, when he took the job as head coach of the United Arab Emirates, before becoming head coach of South Africa in 2000. Under Queiroz, South Africa qualified for the 2002 FIFA World Cup, and Queiroz resigned in March 2002 before the finals, after falling out with the South African Football Association. Queiroz was part of FIFA XI coaching staff, alongside Brazilian Carlos Alberto Parreira, in a humanitarian friendly match played in war-torn Sarajevo against Bosnia and Herzegovina on 25 April 2000.

Queiroz became a coach at English club Manchester United in June 2002. He began his work at the start of the 2002–03 season, working alongside Alex Ferguson, who had gone without an assistant manager since the departure of Steve McClaren in the middle of 2001.

=== Real Madrid ===
Queiroz's position at Manchester United as assistant manager attracted the attention of Real Madrid, who wanted Queiroz as their manager to replace departing manager Vicente del Bosque in the summer of 2003. It was an opportunity to work with FIFA World Player of the Year award winners Zinedine Zidane, Ronaldo and Luís Figo, an opportunity that Queiroz felt unable to turn down. Queiroz was appointed on a two-year contract, a week after the arrival of Manchester United player David Beckham. In the same summer, Real Madrid lost veteran defender Fernando Hierro, defensive midfielder Claude Makélélé and striker Fernando Morientes.

Real Madrid got off to a winning start of the 2003–04 season, defeating Mallorca in the Supercopa de España, with Beckham scoring in the second leg. By mid-season, the team topped the La Liga table and was in contention for the Copa del Rey and the Champions League. They lost their final five matches and finished fourth, with Valencia winning the title. Real Madrid lost the Copa del Rey final to Real Zaragoza and were eliminated from the Champions League in the quarter-finals by Morientes's new team Monaco, after a 4–2 first leg win, ending the season with the Supercopa as the only trophy won. After ten months at the Santiago Bernabéu, Queiroz was sacked in May 2004.

=== Return to Manchester United ===
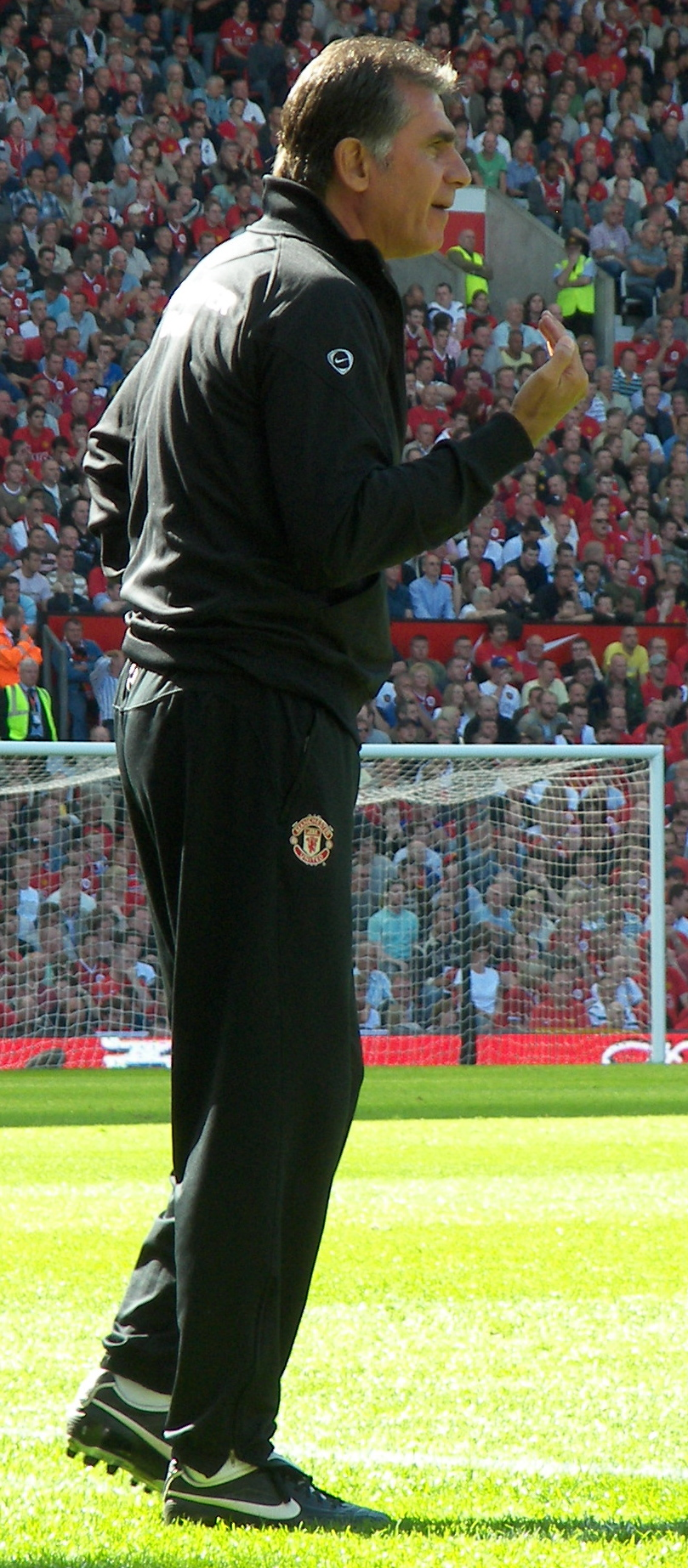
Queiroz at Old Trafford during a match between Manchester United and Reading on 12 August 2007

Queiroz returned to United as Ferguson's assistant in June 2004. Some sources noted the effect of his absence on the club's 2003–04 season, in which they came third in the league and exited from the Champions League in the round of 16, despite winning the FA Cup, which would be Ferguson's last FA Cup triumph.

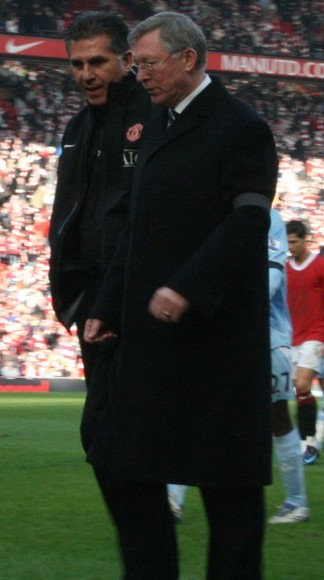
Queiroz with Sir Alex Ferguson during the Manchester derby against Manchester City on 10 February 2008

In his 2014 autobiography, United captain Roy Keane stated that an argument with Queiroz about loyalty was one of the reasons why the Irishman quit the club in 2005. Keane said during ITV's coverage of the 2018 FIFA World Cup that "one of my big regrets is that I probably should have ripped his head off".

Queiroz was linked with managerial roles with Portuguese side Benfica and the United States national team in 2006, and remained with Manchester United to help them win the Premier League in 2007. Queiroz was seen conducting interviews with BBC programmes, such as Match of the Day, as at the time Alex Ferguson refused to speak with the BBC after allegations by the BBC's Panorama programme that Ferguson's younger son Jason and Portsmouth manager Harry Redknapp had been involved in corruption regarding cuts in transfer fees. Some of Queiroz's post-match opinions on refereeing were controversial. For example, in 2008 Queiroz was – unsuccessfully – charged with improper conduct by the Football Association after describing referee Martin Atkinson's performance in a match as "a disgrace".

In March 2008, it was reported that Benfica had, once again, approached Queiroz to become their manager and had made a formal request to Manchester United. United were involved in the 2007–08 Premier League title race, five points clear at the top, with seven games remaining, and also were still competing in the Champions League – being in the quarter-finals at the time of the enquiry. Queiroz did not make any public response to the approach. United would win both of the competitions.

Carlos Queiroz was brilliant. Just brilliant. Outstanding. An intelligent, meticulous man. He was good for me. He was a Rottweiler. He was the closest you could be to being the Manchester United manager without actually holding the title.

— Manchester United manager Alex Ferguson on Queiroz in Alex Ferguson: My Autobiography

Following Benfica's approach, and amid rumors of an opening as the Portugal national coach, Ferguson started to push for Queiroz to be his successor as manager at Old Trafford and discouraged any possible suitors from approaching him. Rumours over the summer of 2008 continued to link Queiroz with the Portugal national team, following the departure of Luiz Felipe Scolari. On 11 July 2008, Manchester United agreed to release Queiroz from his contract, and he was appointed manager for the Portugal national team.

=== Portugal ===
On 11 July 2008, it was announced that Queiroz was leaving Manchester United, having agreed to a four-year contract to become the head coach of the Portugal national team.

Quieroz was suspended for six months by the Portuguese Anti-Doping Authority (Autoridade Antidopagem de Portugal) on 30 August 2010, when he was judged to have disrupted their pre-World Cup procedures; he had been suspended for a month by the Portuguese Football Federation (FPF) for using inappropriate language towards the testers, a lesser charge that he admitted to. He was sacked by the FPF on 9 September. On 23 March 2011, the Court of Arbitration for Sport upheld his appeal against the Anti-Doping Authority, annulling his suspension.

=== Iran ===
On 4 April 2011, Queiroz agreed to a two-and-a-half-year deal to coach Iran until the end of the 2014 World Cup in Brazil, alongside goalkeeping coach Dan Gaspar and assistant coach Omid Namazi.

Since Queiroz's role as manager of the Iran national team, he has been renowned for introducing players from the Iranian diaspora to the national squad. These players include German Iranians Daniel Davari and Ashkan Dejagah, Dutch Iranian Reza Ghoochannejhad, Swedish Iranians Omid Nazari and Saman Ghoddos, and Iranian American Steven Beitashour, among others.

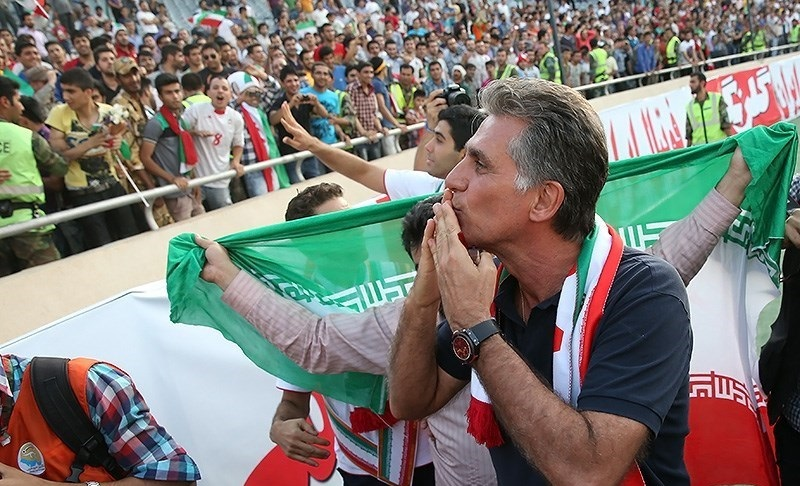
Queiroz celebrating following Iran's qualification for the 2014 World Cup

Iran qualified for the 2014 World Cup as group winners and competed in Group F alongside Argentina, Nigeria, and Bosnia and Herzegovina. On 1 June 2014, Queiroz announced his 23-man squad. Prior to the tournament, they founded the Central Asian Football Association.

In the opening match of the tournament on 16 June, Iran drew Nigeria 0–0, making it their first clean sheet of the FIFA World Cup. In their next match, Iran was defeated by Argentina 1–0 with a goal from Lionel Messi, and received praise after holding Argentina for 90 minutes while creating some attacking opportunities of their own. Iran was eliminated from the tournament in their next game, a 3–1 defeat to Bosnia and Herzegovina. Iran's lone goal was scored by Reza Ghoochannejhad. Based on a Forbes report, Queiroz's salary as an Iranian team manager was US$2,098,060 during the 2014 FIFA World Cup.

After the tournament, Queiroz extended his contract until the 2018 World Cup.

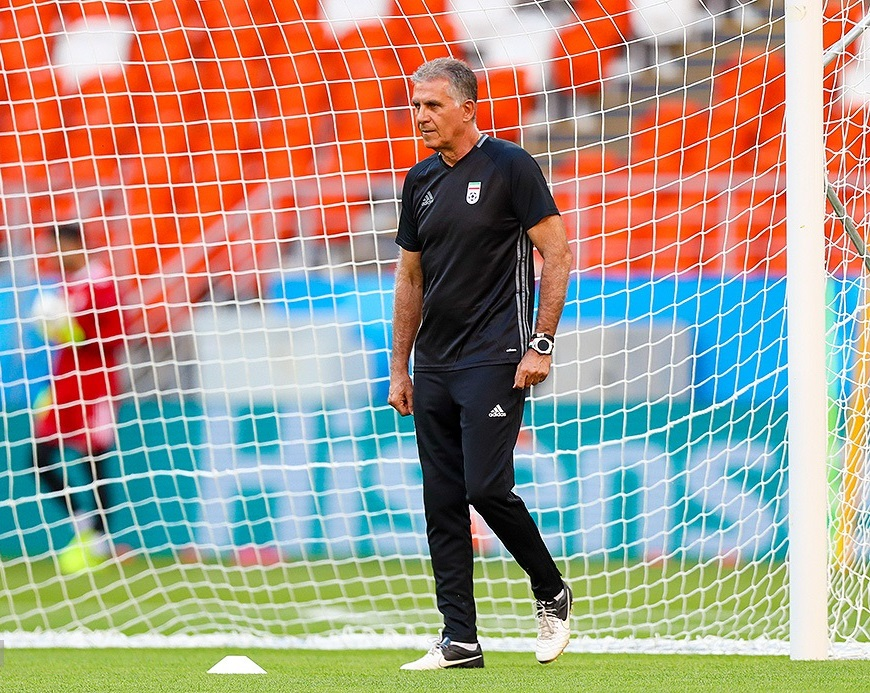
Queiroz overseeing a training session in March 2016

Iran continued their winning streak after 2014 World Cup qualification, securing qualification to the 2015 Asian Cup months later as the highest ranked seed. Iran qualified for the 2015 AFC Asian Cup as group winners, where they were the highest ranked seed. Iran faced Bahrain, Qatar, and the United Arab Emirates in Group C.

With the second highest number of fans in the tournament after hosts Australia, the Iranians defeated Bahrain 2–0. A defensive-minded Iran then defeated Qatar 1–0 thanks to a Sardar Azmoun goal before defeating the UAE by the same scoreline to reach the top of their group.

In the quarter-finals, Iran faced Iraq, who they had beaten weeks prior in a friendly match. Having received a red card in the first half from referee Ben Williams, Iran led an effort with ten men, scoring two goals in extra time to draw the match 3–3. In the ensuing penalty shootout, Iran lost 7–6 in sudden death.

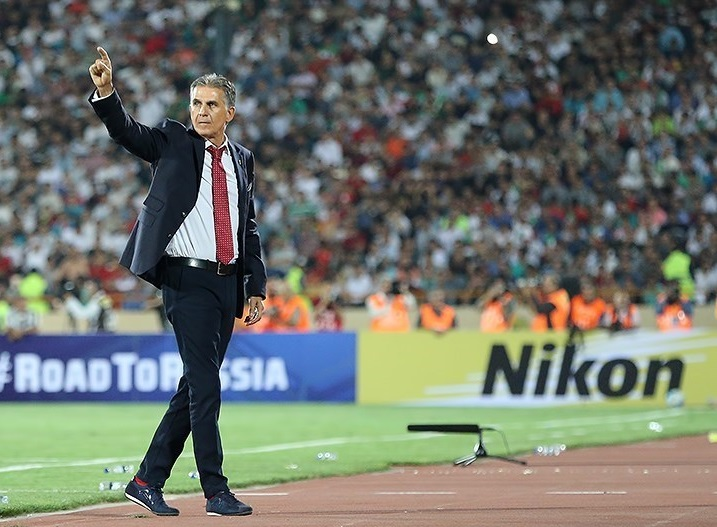
Queiroz during a qualification match against Qatar

Iran began their 2018 World Cup qualification campaign with friendly matches against Chile and Sweden in March 2015. Queiroz resigned from his managerial post thereafter due to disagreements with the Iranian Football Federation. On 14 April 2015, Iran were drawn with Oman, India, Turkmenistan, and Guam in the second round of qualifiers.

On 26 April, Queiroz announced that he would continue as the manager of Iran for their 2018 World Cup campaign. Iran ended their second round qualifying with a 4–0 victory against India and a 2–0 win against Oman. Iran finished top of the group with 20 points from eight games, Queiroz and his team managed to avoid defeat and remain unbeaten in the second round of World Cup qualifying. Iran was placed in Pot 1 alongside Australia for the draw of the third round of World Cup qualifying. They drew with South Korea, Uzbekistan, Qatar, China and Syria. With two games remaining, Iran qualified to the World Cup with defeating Uzbekistan at the Azadi Stadium. They became third team to qualify to the World Cup after host Russia and Brazil.

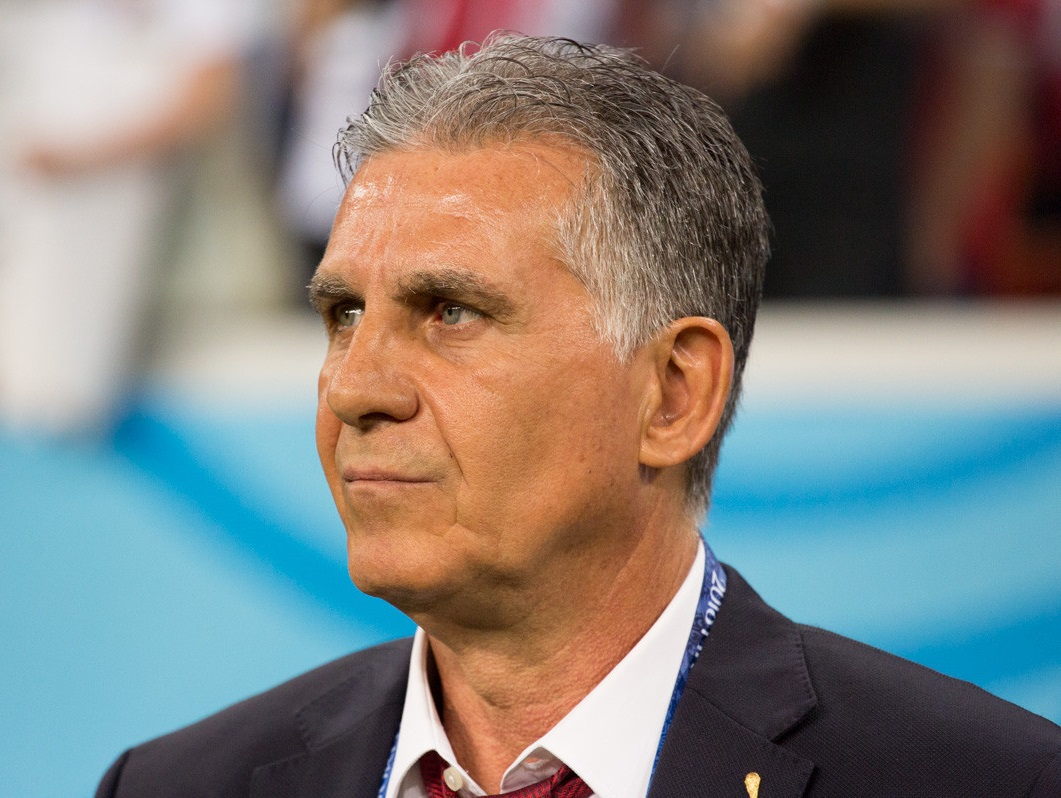
Queiroz during group match against Portugal

In April 2018, Queiroz was one of the applicants for the vacant Cameroon national team job.

After going undefeated in qualification, Iran beat Morocco 1–0 in their opening match of the tournament thanks to an own goal from Aziz Bouhaddouz, and lost 1–0 to Spain in their second match. Their final match saw Queiroz come up against his home country, Portugal; after going 1–0 down, goalkeeper Alireza Beiranvand saved a penalty from Cristiano Ronaldo to give Iran hope, and they had to wait until injury time at the end of the second half for an equaliser from Karim Ansarifard. The draw might have been enough to see Iran into the knockout phase for the first time in their history at the expense of the Spaniards, and Spain's injury-time equaliser in a 2–2 draw with Morocco meant they qualified with Portugal.

On 23 September 2018, Queiroz extended his contract until the 2019 AFC Asian Cup, hoping to win Iran's first continental title since 1976. With wins over Yemen and Vietnam, and a draw with neighbours Iraq, Iran won Group D and progressed to the round of 16, where they met the third-placed team from Group F, Oman. A 2–0 win over Oman set up a quarter-final against China, whom they beat 3–0. In his 100th match in charge of Iran, the semi-final against Japan saw Queiroz's team concede their first goals of the tournament, all in the second half, losing 3–0. After the match, he left Team Melli.

=== Colombia ===
On 7 February 2019, Queiroz took over as the new manager of Colombia on a three-year contract. He was the only European and African coaching a South American national team, and was the fourth European manager to be in charge of the Colombian team after Friedrich Donnenfeld, Toza Veselinović and Blagoje Vidinić. Queiroz's stint with Colombia began with the 2019 Copa América, where Colombia took first place in their group with a perfect nine points, including a 2–0 win over Argentina. Colombia was knocked out by Chile in the last eight, where Colombia was saved with two goals for Chile being disallowed and failed in the penalty shootout.

Colombia began the 2022 World Cup qualifiers with hope to make it their third in a row for the second time, and Colombia appeared to be on the right path where they beat neighbor Venezuela and held Chile. When matches resumed following the COVID-19 pandemic, Colombia's performance slipped, with a 0–3 home loss to Uruguay (its worst ever home loss in 82 years) before being thrashed 1–6 by Ecuador, the biggest ever defeat, and this put the end to Carlos Queiroz's reign as Colombia's boss.

=== Egypt ===
On 8 September 2021, the Egyptian Football Association announced the signing of Carlos Queiroz to replace Hossam El Badry.

At the beginning of the tournament, the Egyptian team underwent a loss against Nigeria in the first round of Group D of the African Nations Cup. They defeated Guinea Bissau with a goal scored by Mohamed Salah in the second round of Group D. In the third round of group D, Egypt defeated Sudan with a goal scored by Mohamed Abdel Moneim, finishing with 6 points in the group and qualifying for the round of 16. They qualified for the quarter-finals after defeating Ivory Coast 5–4 in a penalty shootout after a goalless draw in the round of 16. In the quarter-final match, Egypt won 2–1 against Morocco. In the semi-final match, they qualified for the final by defeating the host nation Cameroon 3–1 on penalties. This win marked the first time that Queiroz had guided a national team into the final of a competitive association football tournament. Egypt lost to Senegal after a penalty shootout.

Egypt qualified for the third round of the World Cup qualifications to face Senegal for a spot in the World Cup in Qatar. After a 1–0 win in Cairo, and a 1–0 loss in Dakar, Egypt lost again on penalties; hence, they failed to reach the final competition. Queiroz later agreed with the Egyptian Football Association to terminate his contract by mutual consent.

=== Return to Iran ===
On 7 September 2022, Queiroz was rehired for a second spell as Iran coach ahead of the 2022 FIFA World Cup, his third World Cup with the country. His appointment was promised as part of Mehdi Taj's successful campaign for a second spell as president of the Football Federation Islamic Republic of Iran. At the World Cup in Qatar, Iran were eliminated in the group stage, following a 6–2 loss to England that went down as the biggest defeat Iran has ever suffered in its World Cup history, a 2–0 win over Wales and a 1–0 defeat to the United States.

For Queiroz's Iran team, the World Cup took place against the backdrop of the Mahsa Amini protests back home. Queiroz said that his players had the right to protest as long as it conformed with the regulations of the tournament. He took issue with BBC reporter Shaimaa Khalil asking Iran player Mehdi Taremi for his opinion on the protests, and questioned her on whether she would ask the other teams in Iran's group about the British and American withdrawal from Afghanistan.

=== Qatar ===
Queiroz was appointed manager of the Qatar national team in February 2023, succeeding Félix Sánchez, who led them at the 2022 FIFA World Cup which they hosted. He signed a contract until the 2026 World Cup.

On 6 December 2023, after twelve matches with Queiroz in charge, consisting of four victories, three draws and four losses, the Qatar Football Association announced that his contract had been terminated by mutual agreement, and he had been replaced by Tintín Márquez.

=== Oman ===
On 15 July 2025, Queiroz became the head coach of Oman. Under his tenure, Oman did not qualify for the 2026 FIFA World Cup, finishing last in their fourth-round qualification group after drawing with Qatar and losing to the United Arab Emirates. On 22 March 2026, Queiroz stepped down from the Omani national team reportedly due to the region's instability following the 2026 Iran war.

=== Ghana ===
On 13 April 2026, Queiroz was appointed head coach of the Ghana national team ahead of their participation in the 2026 FIFA World Cup. Hence, he became only the second coach, after Bora Milutinović, to appear at five consecutive FIFA World Cup tournaments. On 17 June, following Ghana's 1–0 victory over Panama in their opening FIFA World Cup match, he became the oldest manager to win a World Cup match, aged 73 years and 108 days, surpassing the previous record of Otto Rehhagel. However, this record was broken later in the same tournament by Hugo Broos.

He stepped down after his team was eliminated by Colombia in the World Cup Round of 32. However, it was announced that he renewed his contract on 2 September 2026. On 1 October 2026, he then came to a mutual agreement with the Ghana Football Association to terminate his contract after two defeats in their opening two 2027 AFCON qualification fixtures.

== Controversy ==
Prior to the final 2014 World Cup qualification match against South Korea, Queiroz was angered by the comment made from Choi Kang-hee, the head coach of South Korea, who complained that Iran did not provide the training facilities with sufficient qualities during South Korea's away qualification match against Iran on 17 October 2012. Choi stated that South Korea would defeat Iran to help Uzbekistan qualify for the World Cup finals with South Korea, and that Iran would have to watch the World Cup on television. In response, Queiroz criticized Choi in his official comments and mocked him by wearing a T-shirt displaying Choi's face.

After Iran's victory against South Korea in their final qualification match, Queiroz showed his anger at the South Korean national coach with a raised fist gesture, which was deemed offensive by the South Korean players and staff, almost causing a fight between the two teams. As a result of the altercations, Sosha Makani was suspended for their opening match of the 2014 World Cup. Queiroz had answered previously to Choi that Iran had fairly shared what they had with the South Korean national team on their visit to Iran.

== Managerial statistics ==
As of match played 29 September 2026

Managerial record by team and tenure
| Team | Nat. | From | To | Record | | | | | | | | Ref. |
| Team | Nat. | From | To | G | W | D | L | GF | GA | GD | Win % | Ref. |
|---|---|---|---|---|---|---|---|---|---|---|---|---|
| Portugal | (Portugal) | 4 September 1991 | 17 November 1993 | 23 | 10 | 8 | 5 | 28 | 14 | +14 | 43.48 | |
| Sporting CP | (Portugal) | 1 June 1994 | 18 February 1996 | 68 | 45 | 17 | 6 | 128 | 51 | +77 | 66.18 | |
| NY/NJ MetroStars | (United States) | 18 July 1996 | 19 November 1996 | 24 | 12 | 0 | 12 | 32 | 34 | −2 | 50.00 | |
| Nagoya Grampus Eight | (Japan) | 21 November 1996 | 21 November 1997 | 38 | 19 | 0 | 19 | 6 | 9 | −3 | 50.00 | |
| United Arab Emirates | (United Arab Emirates) | 19 January 1998 | 18 January 1999 | 16 | 8 | 2 | 6 | 28 | 26 | +2 | 50.00 | |
| South Africa | (South Africa) | 7 October 2000 | 30 March 2002 | 24 | 10 | 8 | 6 | 24 | 19 | +5 | 41.67 | |
| Real Madrid | (Spain) | 25 June 2003 | 31 May 2004 | 59 | 34 | 11 | 14 | 113 | 75 | +38 | 57.63 | |
| Portugal | (Portugal) | 11 July 2008 | 9 September 2010 | 27 | 15 | 9 | 3 | 49 | 18 | +31 | 55.56 | |
| Iran | (Iran) | 4 April 2011 | 28 January 2019 | 100 | 60 | 27 | 13 | 181 | 60 | +121 | 60.00 | |
| Colombia | (Colombia) | 7 February 2019 | 1 December 2020 | 18 | 9 | 5 | 4 | 22 | 18 | +4 | 50.00 | |
| Egypt | (Egypt) | 8 September 2021 | 10 April 2022 | 20 | 11 | 6 | 3 | 25 | 9 | +16 | 55.00 | |
| Iran | (Iran) | 7 September 2022 | 29 November 2022 | 6 | 3 | 1 | 2 | 7 | 8 | −1 | 50.00 | |
| Qatar | (Qatar) | 6 February 2023 | 5 December 2023 | 11 | 4 | 3 | 4 | 18 | 16 | +2 | 36.36 | |
| Oman | (Oman) | 15 July 2025 | 22 March 2026 | 12 | 4 | 4 | 4 | 14 | 14 | +0 | 33.33 | |
| Ghana | (Ghana) | 13 April 2026 | 1 October 2026 | 7 | 1 | 2 | 4 | 5 | 10 | −5 | 14.29 | |
| Career Total | | | | 456 | 249 | 103 | 104 | 680 | 382 | +298 | 54.61 | |

(Note: At the time of Queiroz's tenure in the United States and Japan, the result of matches could not be a draw. In the event of scores being level at the end of 90 minutes, matches would be decided by extra time and penalties.)

== Honours ==
Assistant Manager

Manchester United

- Premier League: 2002–03, 2006–07, 2007–08
- UEFA Champions League: 2007–08

Manager

Portugal

- FIFA World Youth Championship: 1989, 1991
- UEFA European Under-16 Championship: 1989
- FIFA U-17 World Cup third place:1989

Sporting CP

- Taça de Portugal: 1994–95
- Primeira Divisão runner–up: 1994–95
- Supertaça Cândido de Oliveira: 1995

Nagoya Grampus

- Asian Cup Winners' Cup runner–up: 1996–97
- J.League runner–up: 1996
- Sanwa Bank Cup: 1996
- Suntory Championship: 1997

United Arab Emirates

- Arabian Gulf Cup third place: 1998

Real Madrid

- Supercopa de España: 2003
- Copa del Rey runner–up: 2003–04

Egypt

- Africa Cup of Nations runner–up: 2021

== See also ==
- National team managers with 100 or more matches
