= Mirna Bzdigian =

Armenian fashion model

- Born: Mirna Bzdigian; March 8, 2002 (age 24); Aleppo, Syria
- Education: American University of Armenia
- Occupation: Model
- Height: 1.78 m (5 ft 10 in)
- Parent(s): Hratch Bzdigian, Tamar Kassarjian Bzdigian
- Beauty pageant titleholder
- Title: Miss Armenia 2021
- Years active: 2014 - present
- Hair color: Black
- Eye color: Brown
- Major competitions: Miss Armenia 2021 (Winner); Miss World 2022 (Unplaced)

Mirna Bzdigian is a former Competitive Swimmer, TEDx speaker, model, and beauty pageant titleholder who was crowned Miss Armenia 2021. In 2021, Mirna represented Armenia in the Miss World 2022 pageant.

== Early life and education ==
Mirna was born in Aleppo, Syria to an Armenian Parents. At the age of 13, she joined the Syrian National Swimming team for 4 years and competed for Syria locally and internationally. Later on, she moved to Yerevan, Armenia where she continued her studies at the American University of Armenia. She holds a bachelor's degree in Communications, and currently pursuing a Master's degree in Public Affairs from the American University of Armenia as well where it will help her career path in contributing to her country and humanitarian causes.

== Career ==
Mirna started modelling in 2017 in Damascus, Syria where her career started. In 2020, Mirna represented Armenia at Miss Earth 2020 and later on, represented Armenia in the Miss World 2021 pageant at the José Miguel Agrelot Coliseum in San Juan, Puerto Rico.

== External references ==
- Miss World
- Election of Miss Armenia 2021
- Miss World 2021 bares new finals date after 23 contestants tested positive for COVID-19
- Miss Mundo 2021: fecha y hora del evento en Perú, Colombia, Venezuela y Chile?
- Vận động viên bơi chuyên nghiệp trở thành Hoa hậu Armenia
