= Dan Gaspar =

Portuguese football coach

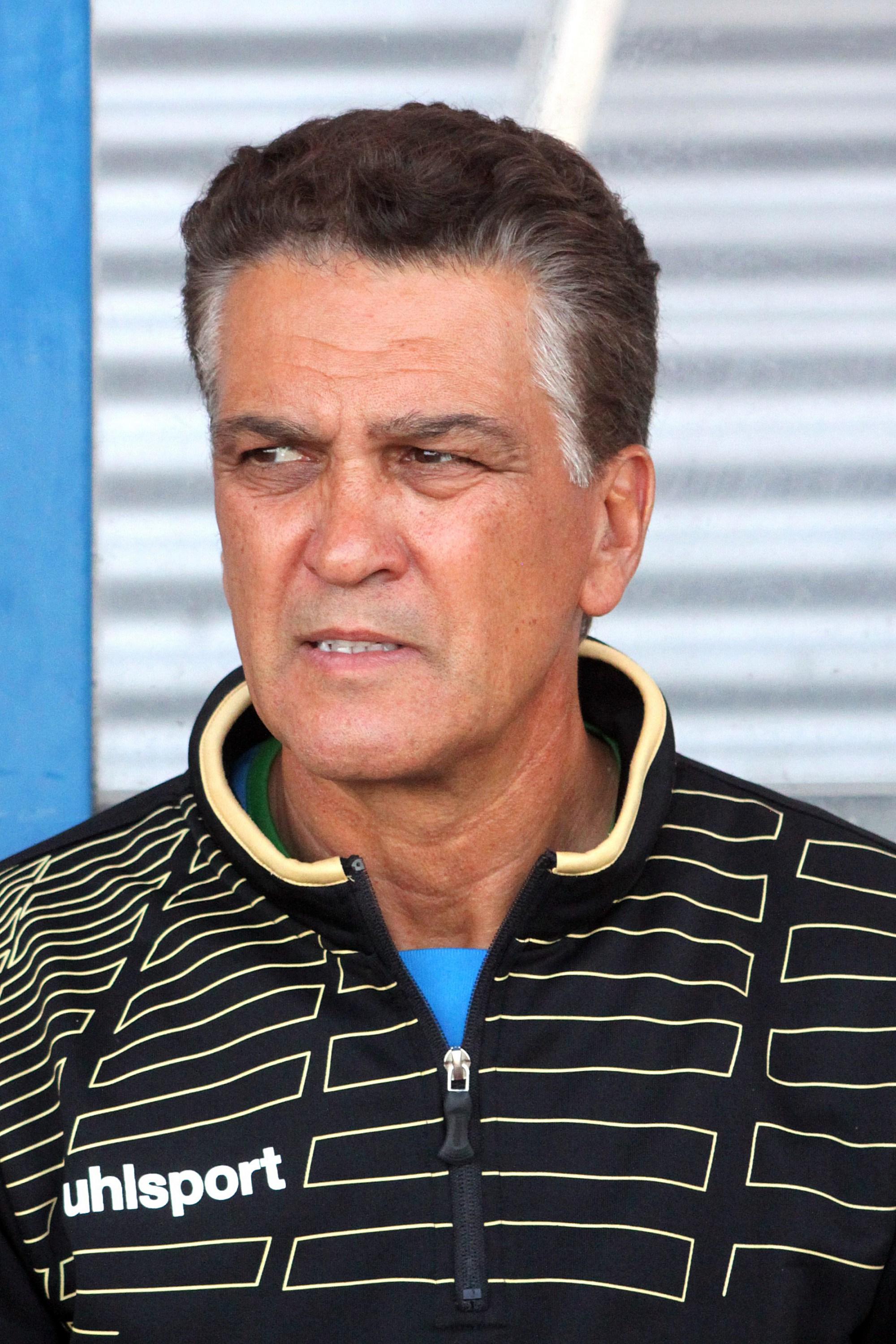
- Gaspar in 2014 with Iran

Personal information
- Full name: Daniel Gaspar
- Date of birth: August 27, 1955 (age 71)
- Place of birth: South Glastonbury, CT, United States

Managerial career
- Years: Team
- 1992–1993: Portugal U16 (goalkeeping coach)
- 1992–1993: Portugal U18 (goalkeeping coach)
- 1995: Sporting CP (goalkeeping coach)
- 1996: Nagoya Grampus (Assistant coach and goalkeeping coach)
- 1996: NY/NJ MetroStars (Assistant coach and goalkeeping coach)
- 1999: Central Connecticut (Associate head coach)
- 2001: South Africa (goalkeeping technical consultant)
- 2000–2002: Connecticut Wolves (Men's Soccer coach)
- 2002–2003: Portugal (goalkeeping coach)
- 2003–2004: Benfica (goalkeeping coach)
- 2004–2005: Porto (goalkeeping coach)
- 2005–2010: Hartford (Men's Soccer coach)
- 2009–2010: Portugal (Technical staff and goalkeeping coach)
- 2011–2017: Iran (Assistant coach and goalkeeping coach)
- 2022–: Hartford Athletic (assistant coach and goalkeeping coach)

Daniel Gaspar (born August 27, 1955, in South Glastonbury, Connecticut) is a Portuguese-American football and goalkeeping coach who is an assistant coach for Hartford Athletic. Gaspar is widely regarded as one of the top goalkeeper coaches in Connecticut along with Dr. Joe Machnik and the late Tony DiCicco.

Gaspar was a long-time assistant and consultant to Carlos Queiroz with whom he co-authored Project 2010 for the USSF in 1998, with the goal to create a blueprint for long-term improvements in US soccer.

Gaspar worked as a technical assistant and also a goalkeeping assistant coach for the Portuguese men's and youth national football teams and for the South African men's national team. He also worked as the goalkeeping coach for Sporting CP, Benfica and Porto in Portugal, and he was the assistant coach of J League Nagoya Grampus Eight in Japan.

Gaspar was the head coach of University of Hartford men's soccer team between 2005 and 2010. He resigned in March 2011. He played as a goalkeeper when he was a business management college student at the University of Hartford. He was also the associate head coach of Central Connecticut State University men's soccer team.

Gaspar was the head coach of A-League Connecticut Wolves (where he sustained a terrible knee injury), the assistant coach of the NY/NJ MetroStars and he was also the associate head coach of Central Connecticut State University men's team. He also founded the Star Goalkeeper Academy in 1995, and he took over the Connecticut Soccer School in 2004 with the aim of bringing his international coaching expertise to the youth level.

== Coaching career ==
Gaspar pursued his passion for goalkeeping as a club and national team goalkeeping coach in Portugal. Since 1993, Gaspar has worked with Carlos Queiroz as a goalkeeping coach, technical adviser, and assistant coach for several club and national team coaching assignments. These included the Portuguese men's national team in 1994, and from 2009 to 2010, the Portuguese U16 and U18 men's and women's youth teams from 1992 to 1993, and the South African men's national football team in 2001, as well as Sporting CP, J League Nagoya Grampus Eight, and the NY/NJ MetroStars. In 2003 Gaspar worked with Luiz Felipe Scolari as the goalkeeping coach for the Portuguese men's national football team and also with José Antonio Camacho as the goalkeeping coach at Benfica, between 2003 and 2004.

On April 4, 2011, Gaspar became the assistant and goalkeeping coach for Iran's national team, alongside head coach Carlos Queiroz and assistant coach Omid Namazi. On June 18, 2013, Iran qualified for the 2014 FIFA World Cup, before qualifying for the 2015 AFC Asian Cup months later.

From 2019-2023, Gaspar was an assistant and the goalkeeping coach at Trinity College in Hartford.

In September 2022, Gaspar joined Hartford Athletic as assistant and goalkeeping coach alongside Tab Ramos and Omid Namazi. Gaspar became the goalkeeper coach for the Ghanaian National team ahead of the World Cup tournament in 2026.

== Head coaching record ==
Record table
Season	Team	Overall	Conference	Standing	Postseason
Hartford Hawks (America East Conference) (2005–2010)
2005	Hartford	5–9–3	2–4–4	8th	
2006	Hartford	4–8–5	2–6	8th	
2007	Hartford	7–4–7	2–1–5	4th	
2008	Hartford	7–8–3	3–4–1	5th	
2009	Hartford	8–7–3	4–2–1	3rd	
2010	Hartford	5–10–0	2–5	7th	
Hartford:		36–46–21 (.451)	15–22–11 (.427)		
Total:		36–46–21 (.451)			
National champion Postseason invitational champion Conference regular season champion Conference regular season and conference tournament champion Division regular season champion Division regular season and conference tournament champion Conference tournament champion
