= Peggy Garabekian =

American beauty pageant titleholder

- Garabekian at Miss Universe Armenia 2025
- Born: Tehran, Iran
- Beauty pageant titleholder
- Title: Miss Universe Armenia 2025
- Major competitions: Miss Universe Armenia 2025; (Winner); Miss Universe 2025; (Unplaced)

Peggy Garabekian is an Armenian-American beauty pageant titleholder, international model, and humanitarian advocate. She won Miss Universe Armenia 2025 and represented Armenia at Miss Universe 2025. She has competed in national and international beauty pageants, including Miss Asia USA and Miss World America.

== Early life ==
Garabekian was born in Tehran, Iran, to Armenian parents. She spent nearly four years of her early childhood in New Delhi, India, before her family relocated to the United States. Having grown up in different parts of the world, she has spoken about maintaining her Armenian heritage.

== Pageantry ==
=== Miss Asia USA ===
In 2015, Garabekian competed at Miss Asia USA as Miss Armenia among over 40 contestants. She placed Third Runner Up, won the Miss Congeniality title, and was awarded the People's Choice Award. The competition was held on November 21, 2015, at the Redondo Beach Performing Arts Center in Redondo Beach, California.

=== Miss United Nations ===
Garabekian held the title of Miss Armenia for Miss United Nations 2023. The competition was initially announced for India from September 25 to 30, 2023.

=== Miss World America ===
From 2023 to 2024, Garabekian served as a Global Ambassador for Miss World America as part of its inaugural class of ambassadors.

In 2023, Garabekian attended the Miss World America finals and was appointed as the first titleholder of Miss Sunshine. The final was held on October 5, 2023, at Meydenbauer Theater in Bellevue, Washington.

In 2024, Garabekian was appointed the first Miss Hollywood titleholder as part of Miss World America's Global Ambassador program. The Miss World America 2024 final was held on November 17, 2024, at the Highline Performing Arts Center in Burien, Washington.

=== Miss California USA ===
==== Miss Pacific Coast USA ====
In 2024, Garabekian competed for the title of Miss Pacific Coast USA and won the title on April 20, 2024, in San Jose, California.

=== Miss Vizcaya Swimwear ===
In May 2025, Garabekian won the Miss Vizcaya Swimwear 2025 competition, held at the Sagamore Hotel in Miami Beach, Florida, during Miami Swim Week. Following her victory, she was named the swimwear brand's representative for the subsequent year.

=== Miss Universe ===
Garabekian won Miss Universe Armenia 2025, and represented Armenia at Miss Universe 2025, held at the Impact Challenger Hall in Pak Kret, Nonthaburi, Thailand on 21 November. At the contest, she spoke out about women's rights and the importance of faith.

== Pageant career ==
Garabekian’s involvement in beauty pageants began in 2012, when she was approached by Virgelia Villegas, president of the production company behind Miss Asia USA, and invited to consider competing. Following her experience competing as a contestant in Miss Asia USA, Garabekian began working in pageant coaching and production management in 2015. In a 2023 interview with NEWS.am STYLE, she explained that she wanted to understand the business and organizational aspects of producing pageant competitions. She later described her experience in production as informing her work as a mentor and adviser to contestants, providing guidance on different aspects of competition preparation.

In a 2024 interview with Glam Week, Garabekian discussed the transition from competing as a delegate to learning the business side of pageant production. She described the process as requiring her to examine how competitions operated behind the scenes and develop the skills needed to guide and educate contestants. The interview also discussed her approach to mentoring, including the importance of preparation and building meaningful connections with delegates.

On 18 August 2025, Garabekian served as a judge at Miss Grand USA 2025, the eighth edition of the national competition. The final was held at the Rio Showroom at the Rio Hotel & Casino in Las Vegas, Nevada.

== Humanitarian work and advocacy ==
Garabekian was involved with Unified Young Armenians (UYA), an Armenian-American community organization, from 2009 to 2019. She served as the organization's president from 2018 to 2019. In April 2018, UYA introduced her as its new president during an Armenian Genocide commemoration march in Los Angeles.

=== Artsakh Avenue ===
As part of her work with UYA, Garabekian helped propose and coordinate an initiative to rename a section of Maryland Avenue in Glendale, California, in honor of Artsakh. The proposal was advanced by UYA in 2018, and the Glendale City Council approved the renaming of a two-block section of the street in June of that year. Artsakh Avenue was officially unveiled in October 2018, marking the first time a street in Glendale had been given an Armenian name and recognizing the city's Armenian American community and its cultural ties to Artsakh.

=== Community and charitable activities ===
Garabekian also described her involvement in organizing the annual Armenian Genocide commemoration march and candlelight vigil, events honoring the victims of the genocide. In her 2023 interview, she said the gatherings drew thousands of attendees and sought to raise awareness of the genocide. In 2018, during Garabekian's presidency, Unified Young Armenian's March for Justice commemorating the centennial of the Armenian Genocide drew nearly 166,000 participants and was described by Armenpress as the largest protest in Los Angeles history.

According to the same interview, Garabekian collaborated with Children's Hospital Los Angeles on toy, clothing, and blood drives. She also reported contributing to telethons benefiting Armenian American orphans and the Disabled Children's Fund, as well as participating in clothing, food, toy, and winter donation drives for orphaned children and families experiencing hardship in Armenia and for homeless shelters in Los Angeles. She further described participating in fundraising efforts through various organizations to assist people affected by the war in Artsakh.

During Garabekian's presidency of Unified Young Armenians, the organization participated in the Hollywood Christmas Parade in Hollywood, Los Angeles, California. On November 25, 2018, UYA's delegation marched with more than 150 participants and promoted Artsakh through a parade display encouraging visitors to explore the region.

In a 2023 interview, Garabekian stated that her participation in Miss Asia USA included taking part in events associated with Michelle Obama's Let's Move campaign, which aimed to address childhood obesity, and participating in activities surrounding the 2015 Special Olympics World Games, which promoted inclusion for people with intellectual disabilities.

=== Advocacy for women's rights ===
Garabekian has also spoken publicly about women's rights and the empowerment of women and girls. In a 2024 interview with Glam Week, she discussed supporting organizations such as Nadia's Initiative, which advocates for survivors of sexual violence and works to rebuild communities affected by the Islamic State's genocide against the Yazidi people in Sinjar, Iraq. She described plans to establish an organization focused on rehabilitation, education, and advocacy for women and girls who have experienced violence, trafficking, and discrimination. These plans included educational and vocational opportunities, support for survivors, and advocacy for gender equality.

In September 2025, ahead of Miss Universe 2025, Garabekian discussed her intention to use her platform to raise awareness of the rights of women and girls who face restrictions on their freedoms. She identified Nadia's Initiative as one of the organizations whose work she wanted to highlight, particularly its efforts to support women and girls affected by violence and oppression.

== Modeling career ==
Garabekian began modeling after entering the pageant industry. In a 2023 interview with NEWS.am STYLE, she said she had no modeling experience before participating in pageants. She stated that pageantry subsequently led to opportunities in print, television, and runway modeling, as well as representation by modeling agencies.

In a 2025 interview with the same publication, Garabekian was described as an Armenian-American model and pageant titleholder ahead of her participation in Miss Universe 2025.

Awards and achievements
Preceded by Emma Avanesyan	Miss Universe Armenia; 2025	Succeeded by Arena Zeynalian
