= Sanja Papić =

Serbian model

- Born: Sanja Papić; 25 June 1984 (age 42); Novi Sad, SR Serbia, SFR Yugoslavia
- Occupation: Model
- Height: 1.84 m (6 ft 1/2 in)
- Spouse: widow /Sanja was married to Dragoslav Ognjanović
- Beauty pageant titleholder
- Years active: 2002-present
- Major competitions: Miss Yugoslavia 2002 (1st Runner-Up; Miss Serbia and Montenegro Universe/Europe 2003); Miss Universe 2003 (3rd Runner-Up); Miss Europe 2003 (2nd Runner-Up)

Sanja Papić (Serbian Cyrillic: Сања Папић, born 25 June 1984 in Novi Sad, SR Serbia, SFR Yugoslavia) is a Serbian supermodel and beauty pageant titleholder who represented Serbia and Montenegro at Miss Universe 2003 where she placed 3rd Runner-Up and Miss Europe 2003 where she placed 2nd Runner-Up. Sanja is the most successful Miss Yugoslavia in history of Miss Universe.

== Professional career ==
In September 2003, Papić finished as a runner-up at the Miss Europe contest in Paris. In November, she left for New York in the company of Roberto Cavalli as his muse. She had been Omega Watches Ambassador (alongside Michael Schumacher, Anna Kournikova and Cindy Crawford), following a contract between Omega and Sanja signed in August 2003. She was also the face for the "Ice Tea" commercials of the Apatin Brewery in her homeland. She was also involved with Winsenia Cream.

Her most memorable professional moment to date came when she represented Serbia and Montenegro at the Miss Universe 2003 pageant in Panama, finishing in fourth place. Today, Sanja is the promotional face of "Zlatibor voda" (Serbia) and she works as a Public Relations Manager for Megatrend University. She worked and walked the runways and fashion shows for the best Serbian fashion designers in Serbia in the last 15 years.

== Sources ==
- Interview in English, 2004 (includes images)

https://zadovoljna.nova.rs/poznati/razvojni-put-sanje-papic-od-misice-s-megatrenda-preko-tragicnog-braka-do-maldiva/

https://www.nportal.rs/vest/9682/zena/vesti/manekenka-sanja-papic-ubistvo-supruga

Awards and achievements
Preceded by Sladjana Bozovic	Miss Yugoslavia 1st runner-up 2002	Succeeded by Title abolished
Preceded by (South Africa) Vanessa Carreira	Miss Universe 3rd runner-up 2003	Succeeded by (Paraguay) Yanina González
Preceded by (Turkey) Esra Eron	Miss Europe 2nd runner-up 2003	Succeeded by (France) Cindy Fabre
Preceded by First edition	Miss Universe Serbia and Montenegro; 2003	Succeeded by Dragana Dujovic
Preceded by First edition	Miss Europe Serbia and Montenegro; 2003	Succeeded by Sandra Obradovic
