= Traumpartner TV =

- Country: Germany
- Broadcast area: Germany
- Network: RTL
- Headquarters: Cologne, Germany

Programming
- Language(s): German
- Picture format: 576i (4:3 SDTV)

Ownership
- Owner: RTL Group
- Sister channels: RTL Television

History
- Launched: 1 December 2004; 20 years ago
- Closed: 31 October 2007; 17 years ago

Links
- Website: www.traumpartner.tv

Traumpartner TV was a German free-to-air interactive TV channel, which could be received by satellite (DVB-S) and some cable networks (DVB-C). The subsidiary of RTL interactive GmbH (formerly RTL NEWMEDIA GmbH) started broadcasting via Astra 19.2°E on 1 December 2004 and offered a dating programming; broadcast daily live from 6 am to 10 pm.

On 1 October 2007, the management confirmed the termination of the program as of 31 October 2007. This was due to the fact that the targets had been set, were not achieved.

== Interactivity ==
The interactivity was due to the possibility of paying for a chat on the screen via Short Message Service (SMS) or Multimedia Messaging Service (MMS). In addition, there was the possibility to communicate with other participants via a connected online dating platform.

== Hosts ==
The face of the station was long time Juliane Ziegler, a winner of the RTL television show The Bachelor. Shermine Shahrivar moderated from December 2004 to August 2005.

From time to time guest or co-moderators appeared, e.g.:

- Carsten Spengemann
- Nazan Eckes
- Isabel Varell
- Ruth Moschner
- Oli.P (Oliver Petszokat)
