= Miss Europe 2005 =

International beauty pageant

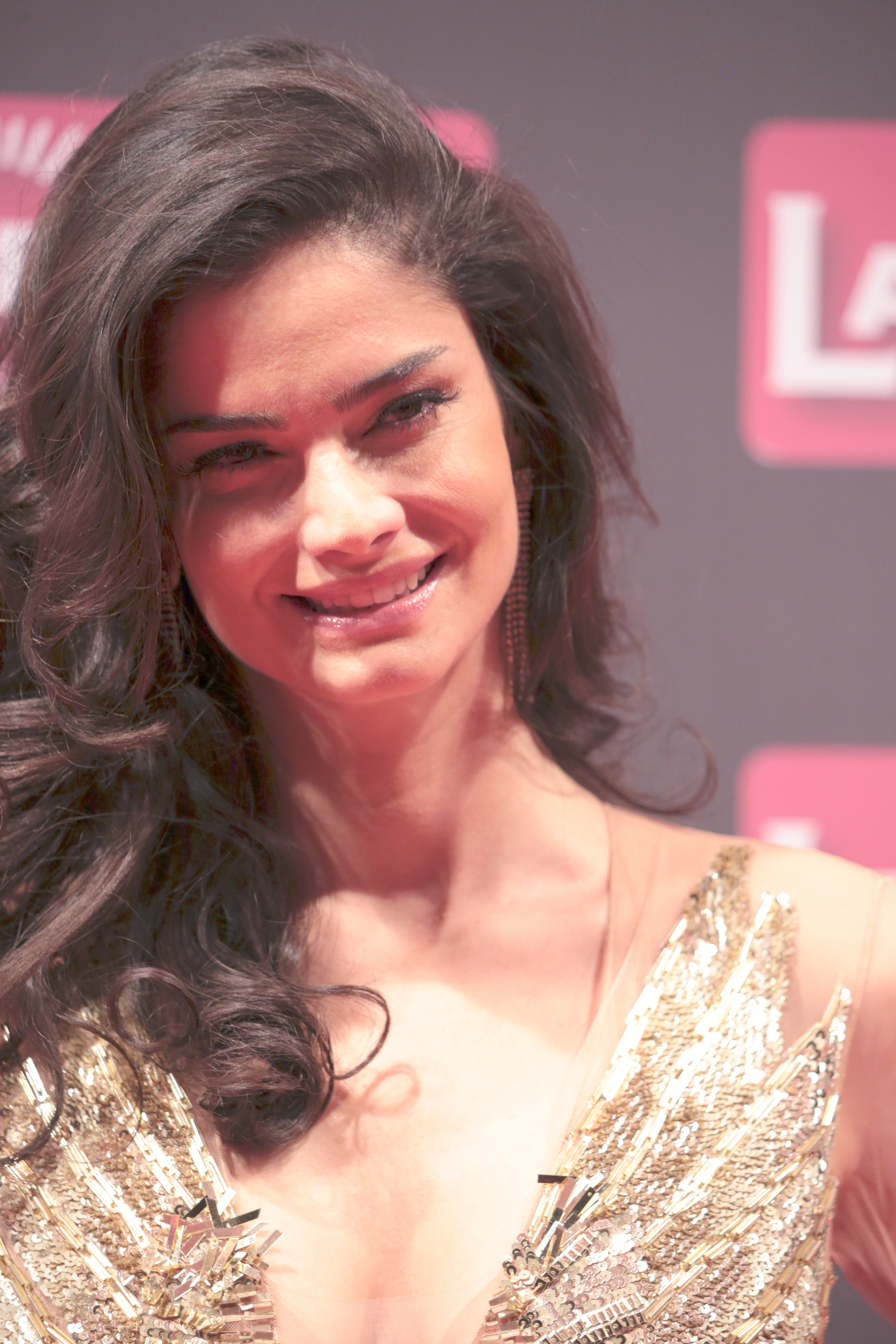
- Shermine Shahrivar, Miss Europe 2005
- Date: March 12, 2005
- Presenters: Jean-Pierre Foucault
- Venue: Palais des Sports, Paris, France
- Broadcaster: TF1
- Entrants: 36
- Placements: 12
- Withdrawals: Albania; Austria; Lithuania; United Kingdom
- Returns: England; Moldova; Romania; Turkey
- Winner: Shermine Shahrivar; Germany

Miss Europe 2005 was the 57th edition Miss Europe pageant and the second edition under Endemol France. It was held in Palais des Sports, Paris, France on March 12, 2005. Shermine Shahrivar of Germany was crowned Miss Europe 2005 by outgoing titleholder Zsuzsanna Laky of Hungary.

== Results ==
=== Placements ===
Placement	Contestant
Miss Europe 2005	Germany – Shermine Shahrivar
1st Runner-Up	Armenia – Lusine Tovmasyan
2nd Runner-Up	France – Cindy Fabre
3rd Runner-Up	England – Laura Shields
4th Runner-Up	Slovakia – Tatiana Keremeryova
Top 12	Czech Republic – Edita Hortová; Finland – Mira Salo; Greece – Valia Kakouti; Iceland – Sigrun Bender; Poland – Karolina Gorazda; Serbia and Montenegro – Sandra Obradovic; Turkey – Birce Akalay

== Judges ==
- Adriana Sklenaříková (President of the Jury) – model
- Élodie Gossuin – Miss France 2001 and Miss Europe 2001
- Michel Levaton – president of Metropolitan modeling agency
- Paco Rabanne – fashion designer
- Charles Aznavour – singer
- Jean-Daniel Lorieux – photographer
- Viviane Blassel – fashion journalist
- Satya Oblet – model
- Nikos Aliagas – television presenter

== Contestants ==
- Armenia – Lusine Tovmasyan
- Belarus – Ol'ga Gerasimovich
- Belgium – Tatiana Silva
- Bosnia & Herzegovina – Selma Sejtanic
- Bulgaria – Kristina Radneva
- Croatia – Valentina Lesic
- Cyprus – Eliana Charalambous
- Czech Republic – Edita Hortová
- Denmark – Heidi Zadeh
- England – Laura Shields
- Estonia – Aljona Kordas
- Finland – Mira Salo
- France – Cindy Fabre
- Germany – Shermine Shahrivar
- Gibraltar – Helen Gustafson
- Greece – Valia Kakouti
- Hungary – Eszter Toth
- Iceland – Sigrun Bender
- Ireland – Cathriona Duignam
- Israel – Keren Friedman
- Latvia – Julija Djadenko
- Malta – Denise Renée Huizer
- Moldova – Irina Sili
- Netherlands – Tessa Amber Brix
- Norway – Ann Jeanett Ersdal
- Poland – Karolina Gorazda
- Portugal – Marina Raquel G. Rodrigues
- Romania – Andrea Raduna
- Russia – Diana Zaripova
- Serbia and Montenegro – Sandra Obradovic
- Slovak Republic – Tatiana Keremeryova
- Spain – Farah Ahmed Ali
- Sweden – Marie Dahlin
- Switzerland – Céline Nusbaumer
- Turkey – Birce Akalay
- Ukraine – Hanna Dehtyar
