= Eliza Muradyan =

Armenian-Russian model

- Born: Eliza Muradyan; January 16, 1993 (age 33); Yerevan, Armenia
- Height: 1.65 m (5 ft 5 in)
- Beauty pageant titleholder
- Title: Miss MGMU 2013; Miss Universe Armenian 2018
- Hair color: Brown
- Eye color: Green
- Major competitions: Miss Universe Armenia 2018 (Winner); Miss Universe 2018 (Unplaced)

Eliza Muradyan (Armenian: Էլիզա Մուրադյան; Russian: Элиза Мурадян; born January 16, 1993) is an Armenian-Russian model and beauty pageant titleholder who was crowned Miss Universe Armenia 2018. She represented Armenia at the Miss Universe 2018 pageant.

== Personal life ==
Muradyan was born in Yerevan, Armenia where she currently resides. She is presently working to open an evening dress rental business. She used to live in Moscow, Russia, where she studied Medical Science and graduated from the First Moscow State Medical University. In 2013, Muradyan won Miss MGMU 2013 in Russia.

== Pageantry ==
=== Miss Universe Armenia 2018 ===
On 6 July 2018, Muradyan was crowned Miss Universe Armenia 2018, and became the first ever Armenian entrant in Miss Universe.

=== Miss Universe 2018 ===
Muradyan represented Armenia at Miss Universe 2018 pageant where she failed to place in the Top 20.

Awards and achievements
Preceded by Lili Sargsyan	Miss Armenia; 2018	Succeeded by TBD
Preceded by First Edition	Miss Universe Armenia; 2018	Succeeded by Dayana Davtyan
