= Tony DiCicco =

American soccer player-coach (1948–2017)

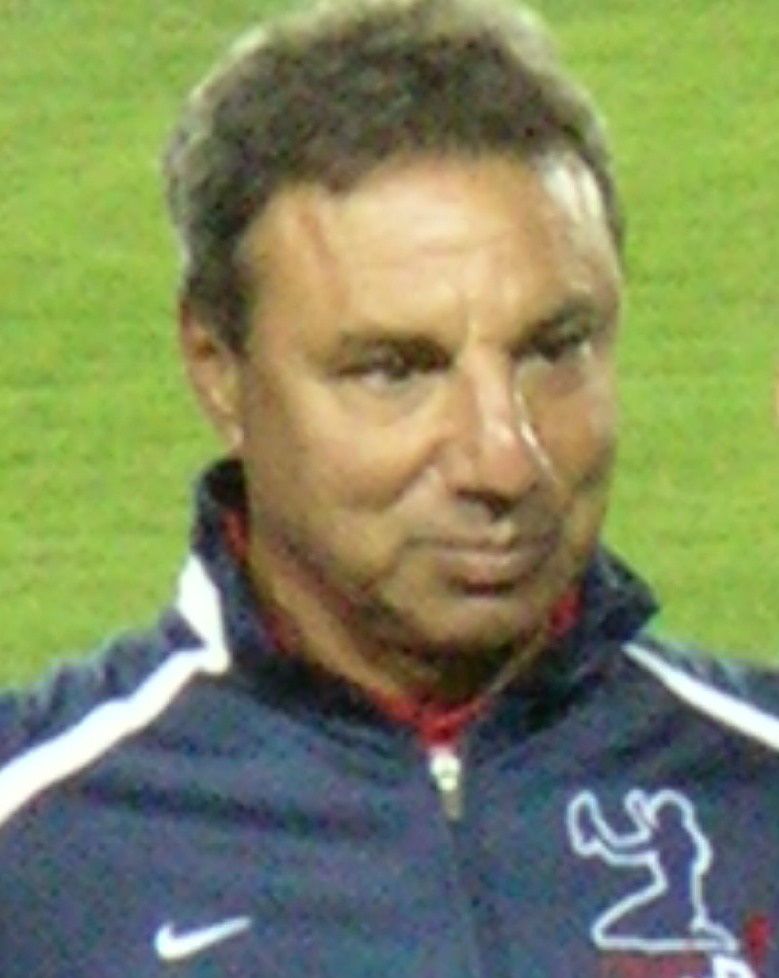
- DiCicco in 2010

Personal information
- Full name: Anthony D. DiCicco Jr.
- Date of birth: August 5, 1948
- Place of birth: Hartford, Connecticut, U.S.
- Date of death: June 19, 2017 (aged 68)
- Place of death: Wethersfield, Connecticut, U.S.
- Height: 5 ft 9 in (1.75 m)
- Position: Goalkeeper

College career
Years	Team	Apps	(Gls)
1966–1969	Springfield Chiefs		

Senior career*
Years	Team	Apps	(Gls)
- Connecticut Wildcats
- Rhode Island Oceaneers

International career
1973	United States	1	(0)

Managerial career
- 1991–1994: United States (women; GK coach)
- 1993: United States U20 (GK coach)
- 1993: United States (women; stand-in)
- 1994–1999: United States (women)
- 2008: United States U20 (women)
- 2009–2011: Boston Breakers
- * Club domestic league appearances and goals

Anthony D. DiCicco Jr. (August 5, 1948 – June 19, 2017) was an American soccer player, coach, administrator, and TV commentator. He is best known as the coach of the United States women's national soccer team from 1994 to 1999, during which time the team won an Olympic gold medal in 1996 and the 1999 FIFA Women's World Cup. He was also the coach of the U.S. team that won the 2008 FIFA U-20 Women's World Cup.

== Early life ==
Born in Hartford, Connecticut, DiCicco was 1966 graduate of Wethersfield High School in Wethersfield, Connecticut, where he lettered in soccer, baseball and basketball.

In 1970, DiCicco graduated from Springfield College in Massachusetts, where he was an All-American goalkeeper his senior year. He played with the Connecticut Wildcats and Rhode Island Oceaneers of the American Soccer League for five years, and made a single appearance for the United States men's national soccer team in 1973. During this time, he also taught Physical Education at Bellows Falls Middle School in Bellows Falls, Vt. for at least the 1972–1976 school years. He also coached the boys 7/8 grade soccer team.

DiCicco was partners with goalkeeper coach Dan Gaspar in the Soccer Plus retail store in the early 1980s.

== Coaching career ==
=== International ===
In 1991, DiCicco became the goalkeeping coach for the United States women's national team; he was also the goalkeeping coach for the 1993 U.S. men's under-20 team. He served as the stand-in head coach for the U.S. women's team during their 3–0 win against Canada on June 21, 1993, in Pontiac, Michigan, due to a previous commitment of head coach Anson Dorrance. He took over as head coach of the women's team in 1994, and compiled a record of 105–8–8, culminating with the team's dramatic win over China in the 1999 World Cup final.

In 2008, DiCicco coached the U.S. U-20 Women's national team to victory in the FIFA Women's U-20 World Cup in Chile.

=== Club ===
DiCicco served as head coach of the Boston Breakers of Women's Professional Soccer from 2009 to 2011.

== Sports administration ==
DiCicco was the founding commissioner of the Women's United Soccer Association from 2000 to 2003. DiCicco has also served on a Technical Advisory board for U.S. Soccer.

== Broadcasting ==
DiCicco worked as a commentator and analyst for ESPN's and Fox Sports' broadcasts of women's soccer, including the main broadcast booth for the 2015 FIFA Women's World Cup.

== Writing ==
DiCicco was co-author of "Catch Them Being Good: Everything You Need to Know to Successfully Coach Girls" with Colleen Hacker and Charles Salzberg.

== Personal life ==
DiCicco and his wife, Diane, have four sons: Anthony, Andrew, Alex, and Nicholas. DiCicco died on June 19, 2017, from cancer at his home in Wethersfield, Connecticut. He was 68 years old.

== Honors and awards ==
=== Individual ===
DiCicco was elected to the National Soccer Hall of Fame Class of 2012.

=== Coach ===
- Women's Olympics Soccer: 1996
- FIFA Women's World Cup: 1999
- FIFA U-20 Women's World Cup: 2008
