= Miss Europe 2003 =

International beauty pageant

- Date: September 12, 2003
- Presenters: Estelle Lefébure; Jean-Pierre Foucault
- Venue: Eurodisney, Nogent-sur-Marne, France
- Broadcaster: TF1
- Entrants: 36
- Placements: 12
- Debuts: Serbia and Montenegro; United Kingdom
- Withdrawals: Georgia; Great Britain; Moldova; Romania; San Marino; Turkey; Yugoslavia
- Returns: Gibraltar; Ireland; Israel
- Winner: Zsuzsanna Laky; Hungary

Miss Europe 2003, was the 56th edition and the first edition under Endemol France; who bought the pageant from Mr. Roger Zeigler and the Mondial Events Organization in between this edition and the previous edition. This years pageant was held at Eurodisney in Nogent-sur-Marne, France on September 12, 2003. Zsuzsanna Laky of Hungary was crowned Miss Europe 2003 by outgoing titleholder Svetlana Koroleva of Russia.

== Results ==
=== Placements ===
Placement	Contestant
Miss Europe 2003	Hungary – Zsuzsanna Laky
1st Runner-Up	Slovakia – Miroslava Luberdova
2nd Runner-Up	Serbia and Montenegro – Sanja Papić
3rd Runner-Up	Spain – Patricia Ledesma Nieto
4th Runner-Up	Poland – Marta Matyjasik
Top 12	France – Corinne Coman; Germany – Alexandra Vodjanikova; Greece – Marietta Chrousala; Israel – Shahar Nehorai; Portugal – Iva Catarina da Silva Lamarao; Russia – Yuliya Akhonkova; United Kingdom – Samantha Vaughan

=== Special awards ===
Award	Contestant
Miss Friendship	Israel – Shahar Nehorai
Miss Photogenic	Poland – Marta Matyjasik

== Judges ==
- Hélène Ségara
- Jean Alesi
- Corinne Touzet
- Eros Ramazzotti
- Ricky Martin
- Inna Zobova
- Cédric Pioline

== Contestants ==
- Albania – Edona Sllanmiku
- Armenia – Anush Grigoryan
- Austria – Bianca Zudrell
- Belarus – Olga Serezhnikova
- Belgium – Julie Taton
- Bosnia & Herzegovina – Dragana Sojic
- Bulgaria – Iva Titova
- Croatia – Nina Slamic
- Cyprus – Elena Andreou
- Czech Republic – Markéta Divišová
- Denmark – Stine Mose
- Estonia – Maili Nomm
- Finland – Piritta Hannula
- France – Corinne Coman
- Germany – Alexandra Vodjanikova
- Gibraltar – Natalie Monteverde
- Greece – Marietta Chrousala
- Holland – Elise Boulogne
- Hungary – Zsuzsanna Laky
- Iceland – Ragnhildur Steinunn Jonsdottir
- Ireland – Catrina Supple
- Israel – Shahar Nehorai
- Latvia – Jelena Keirane
- Lithuania – Oksana Semenishina
- Malta – Odette Cauchi
- Norway – Marna Haugen
- Poland – Marta Matyjasik
- Portugal – Iva Catarina da Silva Lamarao
- Russia – Yuliya Akhonkova
- Serbia and Montenegro – Sanja Papić
- Slovak Republic – Miroslava Luberdova
- Spain – Patricia Ledesma Nieto
- Sweden – Caroline Österberg
- Switzerland – Claudia Oehler
- Turkey – Yelda Kaya
- Ukraine – Nataliya Chernyak
- United Kingdom – Samantha Vaughan
