= Valia Kakouti =

Greek model (born 1981)

Valia Kakouti Βάλια Κακούτη
- Born: Valia Kakouti; 1981 (age 43–44); Athens, Greece
- Height: 5 ft 11 in (1.80 m)
- Beauty pageant titleholder
- Hair color: Black
- Eye color: Brown

Valia Kakouti (Greek: Βάλια Κακούτη) (born 1981 in Athens) is a Greek dancer, teacher, model and beauty pageant titleholder who won the Miss Star Hellas 2004 and was chosen to represent Greece at the Miss Universe 2004 pageant held in Quito, Ecuador. Her face has appeared in numerous fashion magazines such as Maxim and KLIK. She is also a professional ballet dancer and teacher.

== Job appearances ==
- Alpha Digital TV
- Estée Lauder, Greece
