= Zsuzsanna Laky =

Hungarian model

Zsuzsanna Laky, also known as Laky Zsuzsi, (born 17 April 1984 in Nagykanizsa, Zala, Hungary), is a model, former beauty contestant and winner of Miss Europe 2003.

She became the 2nd Hungarian contestant to do so, (the 1st Hungarian Miss Europe was Erzsébet Simon in 1929).

== Creer ==
In 2000 she won the Miss Zala title.

After becoming the 1st runner-up of the Miss Hungary beauty contest in 2002, she represented her country at the Miss Europe beauty contest held in Nogent-sur-Marne, France, and was crowned Miss Europe.

After the win, her face was used to promote Hungary on billboards across Europe. In 2004, her portrait was painted on a Boeing 737 of SkyEurope, for the entire year.

| Preceded by Svetlana Koroleva | Miss Europe; 2003 | Succeeded by Shermine Shahrivar |
