= Shermine Shahrivar =

German model

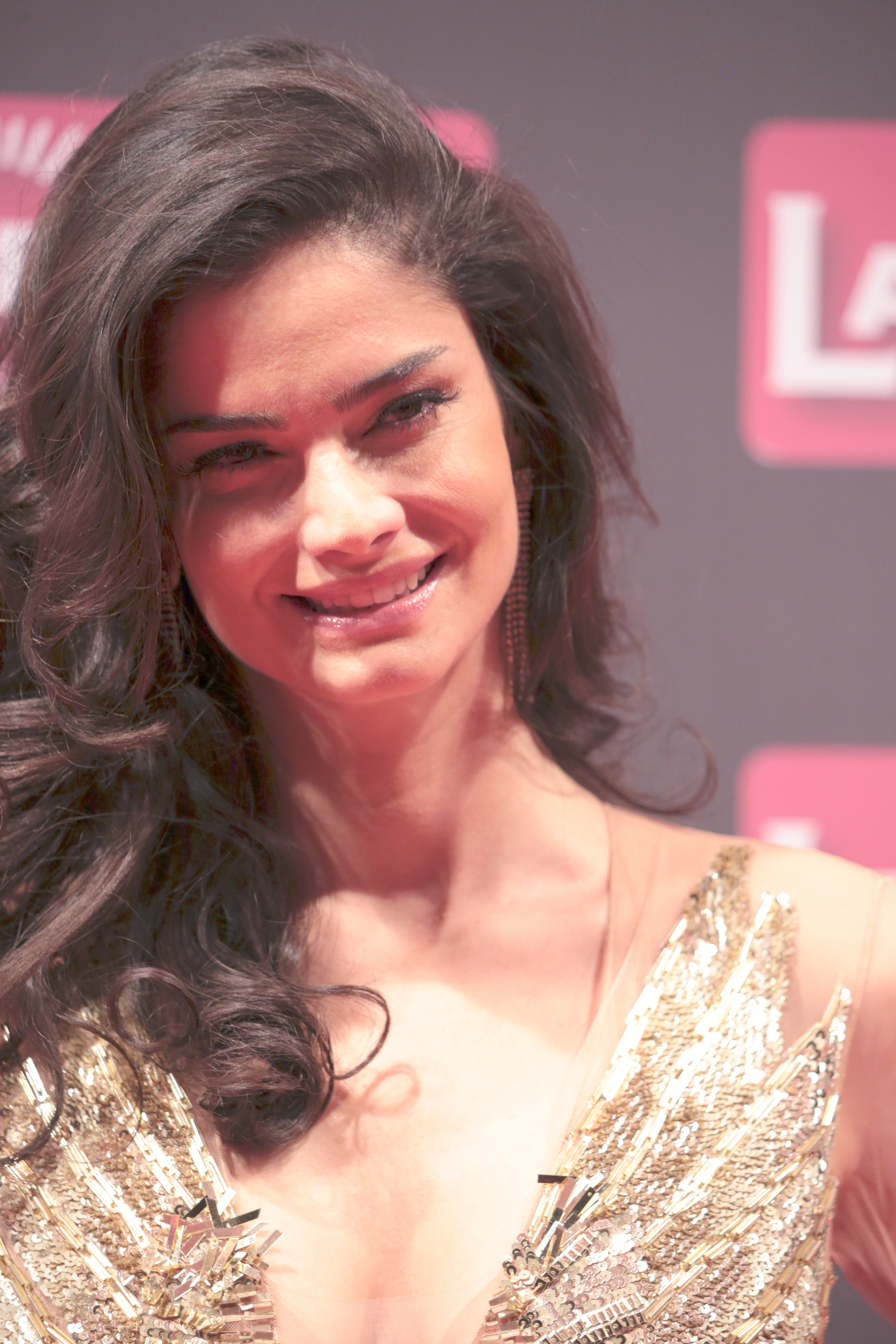
- Shahrivar in 2018
- Born: 17 September 1982 (age 43); Tehran, Iran
- Occupation: Model
- Children: 1
- Beauty pageant titleholder
- Title: Miss Europe 2005
- Hair color: Black
- Eye color: Brown

Shermine Shahrivar (Persian: شرمینه شهریور; born 17 September 1982) is an Iranian model and beauty pageant titleholder who won Miss Europe 2005.

== Early life and education ==
Shahrivar was born to Iranian parents. Her family moved to Germany when she was one year old. Her mother and brothers live in Germany. She was raised speaking German and Persian language, and she is also fluent in French and English. Shahrivar has a university degree in social sciences.

== Career ==
Shahrivar became Miss Germany in 2004 and then won the overall title of Miss Europe in 2005 while competing in France.

She was selected to be the host of the Oberhausen, Germany Nowruz celebration, said to be the largest in the world, in March 2005. She hosted Traumpartner TV in Germany from December 2004 to August 2005.

== Personal life ==
In 2012, Shahrivar began dating designer Markus Klossek, who is 15 years her senior. The couple welcomed their first child, a daughter, in 2013.

From 2016 to 2017, Shahrivar dated Italian businessman Lapo Elkann.

== See also ==
- List of Iranian women models and beauty pageant titleholders

Preceded by Zsuzsanna Laky	Miss Europe; 2005	Succeeded by Alexandra Rosenfeld
